= Fort Pillow =

Fort Pillow may refer to:

- Fort Pillow State Historic Park, Tennessee, U.S.
- Battle of Fort Pillow, 1864
- Fort Pillow naval battle, 1862
- Cold Creek Correctional Facility, formerly Fort Pillow State Prison and Farm, Tennessee, U.S.
- Pillowfort

== See also ==
- Pillow fort
