= Tennessee State Route 207 =

State highway in Tennessee, United States

State Route 207
- Park Road
- SR 207 highlighted in red

Route information
- Maintained by TDOT
- Length: 1.1 mi (1.8 km)
- Existed: July 1, 1983–present

Major junctions
- South end: SR 87 in Fulton
- North end: Park Road at Fort Pillow State Park main entrance

Location
- Country: United States
- State: Tennessee
- Counties: Lauderdale

Highway system
- Tennessee State Routes; Interstate; US; State
← SR 206	→ SR 208

State Route 207 (SR 207), also known as Park Road, is a short 1.1-mile-long (1.8 km) state highway in Lauderdale County, Tennessee. It connects SR 87 and the community of Fulton with Fort Pillow State Park. It is the primary road in and out of the park and is two-lane highway for its entire duration.

== Major intersections ==
The entire route is in Lauderdale County.

Location	mi	km	Destinations	Notes
Fulton	0.0	0.0	SR 87 – Henning, Lower Hatchie National Wildlife Refuge	Southern terminus
Fort Pillow State Park	1.1	1.8	Park Road – Fort Pillow State Park	Northern terminus; continuation north past park entrance
1.000 mi = 1.609 km; 1.000 km = 0.621 mi
