= Tennessee State Route 87 =

State highway in Tennessee, United States

State Route 87
- SR 87 highlighted in red

Route information
- Maintained by TDOT
- Length: 39.18 mi (63.05 km)

Major junctions
- West end: Dead end at Mississippi River near Fort Pillow State Park
- SR 207 at Fulton; SR 371 in Cherry; US 51 near Henning; SR 209 at Henning
- East end: SR 19 near Brownsville

Location
- Country: United States
- State: Tennessee
- Counties: Lauderdale, Haywood

Highway system
- Tennessee State Routes; Interstate; US; State
← SR 86	→ SR 88

State Route 87 (SR 87) is a secondary state highway located in Lauderdale and Haywood counties in West Tennessee. SR 87 runs west to east through mixed terrain of bluffs and rolling hills in Lauderdale County and mostly river bottoms in Haywood County. SR 87 is a two-lane facility throughout its length and features a 50 to 55 miles per hour (80 to 89 km/h) speed limit depending on terrain. This highway is also narrow and in poor condition in several locations. This highway provides direct access to West Tennessee State Penitentiary and indirect access to Fort Pillow State Park via SR 207. The western terminus of SR 87 is notable due to the extreme levels of erosion from the Mississippi River that has created a very sharp and unstable "cliff" that forced TDOT to erect a barricade to stop vehicles from driving over the edge and into the river.

== Route description ==
=== Lauderdale County ===
SR 87 begins on the banks of the Mississippi River in Lauderdale County, just north of the mouth of the Hatchie River. The highway then passes through the community of Fulton, where it has an intersection with SR 207, which provides access to Fort Pillow State Park. SR 87 continues east through wooded areas and passes by the West Tennessee State Penitentiary before coming to the community of Cherry, where it has its first intersection with SR 371. The highway then goes east through farmland and has another intersection with SR 371 before coming to an intersection with US 51/SR 3 and entering the town of Henning. SR 87 enters downtown along Graves Avenue before having a short concurrency with SR 209 (Main Street). SR 87 then leaves Henning along Mc Farland Avenue and passes just south of Durhamville before continuing east and crossing into Haywood County.

=== Haywood County ===
SR 87 continues to wind its way through farmland before entering Brownsville and coming to an end at an intersection with SR 19.

== Major intersections ==
County	Location	mi	km	Destinations	Notes
Lauderdale	Fulton	0.0	0.0	Dead end at Mississippi River	Western terminus
Lauderdale	Fulton			SR 207 north (Park Road) – Fort Pillow State Park	Southern terminus of SR 207
Lauderdale	Cherry			SR 371 east	Western terminus of SR 371; former SR 87A
Lauderdale				SR 371 west	Eastern terminus of SR 371; former SR 87A
Lauderdale	Henning			US 51 (Jefferson Davis Highway/SR 3) – Covington, Ripley	
Lauderdale	Henning			SR 209 north (N Main Street) – Ripley	Western end of SR 209 concurrency; former US 51
Lauderdale	Henning			SR 209 south (S Main Street)	Eastern end of SR 209 concurrency; former US 51
Haywood	Brownsville	39.18	63.05	SR 19 (Haralson Street) to I-40 – Ripley, Nutbush, Downtown	Eastern terminus
1.000 mi = 1.609 km; 1.000 km = 0.621 mi: Concurrency terminus

== Points of interest (South to North) ==
- Fort Pillow State Park
- West Tennessee State Penitentiary
