= Tennessee State Route 371 =

State highway in Tennessee, United States

State Route 371
- TN 371 highlighted in red

Route information
- Maintained by TDOT
- Length: 4.87 mi (7.84 km)
- Existed: July 1, 1983–present

Major junctions
- West end: SR 87 at Cherry
- East end: SR 87 near Glimp

Location
- Country: United States
- State: Tennessee
- Counties: Lauderdale

Highway system
- Tennessee State Routes; Interstate; US; State
← SR 370	→ SR 372

State Route 371 (abbreviated SR 371) is a very short secondary state highway in western Lauderdale County, Tennessee. This highway begins and also ends at SR 87. SR 371 passes through the small communities of Pleasant Hill and Cherry. The entire route of SR 371 is a rural two-lane highway.

== History ==
This highway was first established around 1952 as State Route 87A (SR 87A) as an alternate route to SR 87. On July 1, 1983, the route was renumbered SR 371 as part of a statewide renumbering that year that also included a state takeover of numerous local roads.

== Major intersections ==
The entire route is in Lauderdale County.

Location	mi	km	Destinations	Notes
Cherry	0.00	0.00	SR 87 – Fort Pillow State Park, Henning	Western terminus
	4.87	7.84	SR 87 – Fort Pillow State Park, Henning	Eastern terminus
1.000 mi = 1.609 km; 1.000 km = 0.621 mi
