= Fulton, Tennessee =

Ripley, Tennessee
- Unincorporated community
- Location of Fulton in Tennessee
- Country: United States
- State: Tennessee
- Counties: Lauderdale
- Elevation: 279 ft (85 m)
- Time zone: UTC-6 (CST)
  - Summer (DST): UTC-5 (CDT)
- ZIP code: 38063 (Ripley, Tennessee)
- GNIS feature ID: 1287426

Fulton is a rural unincorporated community in Lauderdale County, Tennessee, United States. Founded in 1827, Fulton is the oldest settlement in Lauderdale County.

== History ==
Fulton was founded in 1827 on 760 acres (310 ha) of land owned by James Trimble. In the following two years, the population rose to 600. Around 1830, after a deadly fever struck the community and killed 200, the remainder of the population moved away; no inhabitants remained by 1832. It was re-surveyed and re-founded in 1835.

== Economy ==
After the abolition of slavery, sharecropping was the primary means of income for low income families in the area. Mostly for the cultivation of cotton, land would be used by sharecroppers in return for a share of the crop to the landowner. Modern machines such as the cotton picker have made the manual cultivation obsolete over time as they took over the work from manual laborers.

As of 2008, there were no industries in Fulton.

== Geography ==
Fulton is at coordinates 35.612°N 89.882°W. The settlement is located on the banks of the Mississippi River, 3 miles (4.8 km) north of the mouth of the Hatchie River. Fulton is situated on the southeastern edge of the New Madrid Seismic Zone, an area with a high earthquake risk. Tennessee State Route 87 and Tennessee State Route 207 both pass through Fulton.

== See also ==
- Battle of Fort Pillow
