= Memphis Battery Colored Light Artillery =

- Active: October 31, 1863 to March 11, 1864
- Country: United States
- Allegiance: Union
- Branch: artillery
- Engagements: Battle of Fort Pillow (one section); Battle of Brice's Crossroads (one section)

The Memphis Battery Colored Light Artillery was an artillery battery that served in the Union Army during the American Civil War. The unit was also called 1st Tennessee Battery (African Descent).

== Service ==
The Memphis Battery Light Artillery (African Descent) was organized at Memphis, Tennessee and mustered in for three years on October 31, 1863 under the command of Captain Carl A. Lamberg. As was custom at the time, the battery was designated the Memphis Battery (Colored) Light Artillery. It was initially attached to the 1st Tennessee Heavy Artillery Regiment (African Descent) as Battery M.

The battery was attached to the garrison of Fort Pickering, District of Memphis, 5th Division, XVI Corps, Department of the Tennessee, to January 1864. 1st Colored Brigade, District of Memphis, Tennessee, XVI Corps, to April 1864.

The Memphis Battery Light Artillery (African Descent) ceased to exist on March 11, 1864 when its designation was changed to Battery D, 2nd United States Light Artillery Regiment (Colored). This designation was changed again on April 26, 1864 to Battery F, 2nd United States Colored Light Artillery.

== Detailed service ==
During its brief existence, the regiment performed post and garrison duty at Memphis, Tennessee, until April 1864. One section under the command of Lieutenant A. M. Hunter was sent to Fort Pillow, Tennessee, on February 15, 1864. During the final assault on the fort, the section of 2nd U.S. Light Artillery (colored) manned two 6-pound James Rifles cannon in the center two embrasures of the fort. All Union artillery was largely ineffective because the guns could not be depressed enough to fire upon the Confederates on the steep terrain below. Nearly every man in this detachment was killed or missing in action when Maj. Gen. Nathan Bedford Forrest captured the fort on April 12, 1864 and Union troops were subsequently massacred.

In his report of April 27, 1864, Captain Lamberg, who was not present at the battle, stated that the section had one officer and 34 enlisted men. Of these, six were killed, four wounded, five taken prisoner, and Lieutenant Hunter and 18 other men were listed as missing in action. Private John Kennedy, who was wounded and captured (but escaped to report to Captain Lamberg), stated that he saw Lieutenant Hunter and several men of the section in the Mississippi River, but that he was captured before seeing what became of them.

Captain Lamberg commanded one section in June 1864 under Brig. Gen. Samuel D. Sturgis on his expedition into Mississippi. The expedition ended in defeat Maj. Gen. Forrest at the battle of Brice's Cross Roads. The section was attached to the brigade of Colonel W. L. McMillen and consisted of two officers and 37 enlisted men. The section's guns were spiked and abandoned on the field.

== Casualties ==
Records are incomplete, but the battery lost at least 6 men killed or mortally wounded during service.

The official report on the Battle of Fort Pillow identified only one soldier of the section of 40 men as a survivor. However, a review of individual service records identifies 8 survivors who were considered missing in action and 5 survivors who were released or paroled from prison camps. One reason for this oversight is that many soldiers of the 2nd US Colored Light Artillery were reported to be members of the 6th US Colored Heavy Artillery.

Many eyewitnesses stated that the officer in command of the section, Lieutenant Alexander M. Hunter, was killed. However, Lt. Hunter survived the battle and the war. (Source: "River Run Red")

One example of a survivor is Daniel Tyler who was shot in the eye and right shoulder. The Confederates threw him into the ditch and buried him in a mass grave. By dawn of the 13th, he managed to dig himself out. Tyler's story was told in many newspaper accounts. Though badly wounded and almost blind, he returned to his unit in May 1864. Then he left to recuperate from his wounds. When he returned in March 1865, he was accused of being absent without leave and was imprisoned in Irving Block Prison in Memphis. Amid the filth and deplorable conditions, he died in prison 4 months later on July 12, 1865. (Source: "River Run Red")

== Commanders ==
- Captain Carl A. Lamberg
- Captain Francis N. Marion

== See also ==
- List of Tennessee Civil War units
- Tennessee in the Civil War
- Battle of Fort Pillow
- 1st Regiment Alabama Siege Artillery (African Descent), aka 6th US Colored Heavy Artillery
