= 1st Battery =

1st Battery may refer to:

- 1st Field Artillery Battery (Australia)
- 1st Arkansas Field Battery
- 1st Arkansas Light Artillery
- 1st Arkansas Colored Light Artillery Battery
- 1st Arkansas Light Artillery Battery (Union)
- 1st Connecticut Light Artillery Battery
- 1st Maine Light Artillery Battery
- 1st Massachusetts Battery
- 1st Minnesota Light Artillery Battery

== See also ==
- First Battery Armory
