= Glimp, Tennessee =

- Unincorporated community
- Location within Tennessee Location within the United States
- Coordinates: 35°41′58″N 89°38′40″W
- Country: United States
- State: Tennessee
- County: Lauderdale
- Elevation: 374 ft (114 m)
- Time zone: UTC-6 (Central (CST))
  - Summer (DST): UTC-5 (CDT)
- Area code: 731
- GNIS feature ID: 1285528

Glimp (also Glimpville) is an unincorporated community in Lauderdale County, Tennessee, United States. The community is located along Tennessee State Route 87, northwest of Henning. The population figure of Glimp is not tracked by the United States Census Bureau since the community is unincorporated but the population in 1880 was 200.
