= 2nd United States Colored Light Artillery Regiment =

U.S. military unit

2nd Regiment Light Artillery U.S. Colored Troops
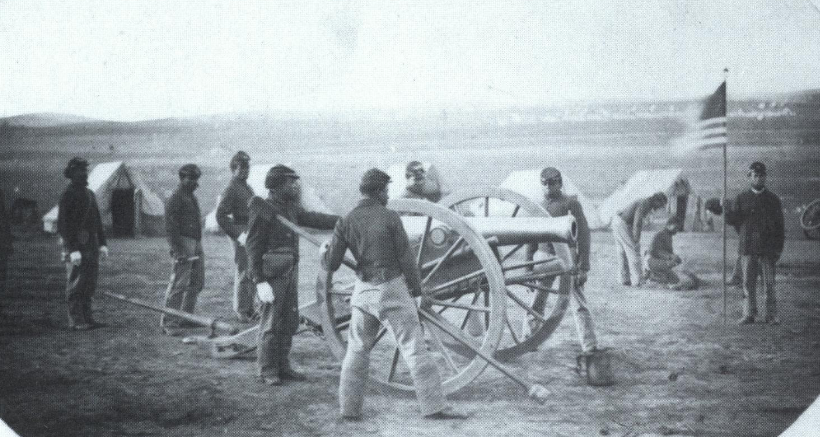
- Soldiers of Battery A, 2nd Light Artillery
- Active: 1863–1866
- Country: United States
- Allegiance: United States Union
- Branch: Artillery; United States Colored Troops
- Size: Regiment
- Equipment: M1857 12-pounder Napoleon 3-inch ordnance rifle M1841 mountain howitzer
- Engagements: American Civil War: Battle of Fort Pillow; Overland Campaign; Battle of Brice's Cross Roads; Smith's Expedition to Tupelo; Price's Missouri Expedition; Battle of Johnsonville; Battle of Nashville

The 2nd Regiment Light Artillery U.S. Colored Troops was a regiment of African-American troops that served in the Union Army during the American Civil War. The different batteries of the 2nd Light Artillery operated independently across various theaters of the war, and one of its batteries, the Independent Battery from Kansas, is notable as the only US Army unit in the Civil War to be commanded entirely by Black officers.

== Colored troops artillery ==
In the Civil War, "light artillery" referred to horse-drawn field artillery that could be deployed quickly to battlefields, rather than heavy artillery based within fixed fortifications. Artillery regiments were divided into companies, called batteries, and each battery fielded up to 6 guns. The majority of US Colored Troops artillery regiments were heavy artillery units based at forts, but the batteries of the 2nd Colored Light Artillery were also often assigned to defend forts and act as heavy artillery, despite light artillery's primary role as a mobile field force.

== Unit history ==
Black soldiers began enlisting in the United States Colored Troops in 1863. The 2nd Regiment Light Artillery was organized on March 11, 1864, from a group of new and pre-existing Colored Troops artillery batteries. Unlike most Civil War regiments, the different batteries of the 2nd Colored Light Artillery operated independently and were never based in the same area as a unified regiment. Each battery was a self-contained unit, and the 2nd Light Artillery Regiment had no field officers or noncommissioned staff. 9 batteries were recruited from different Southern states, and a 10th battery, the Independent Battery was based in Kansas. The officers of the Independent Battery were solely African American, and these men were the only commissioned Black artillery officers in the Civil War. As such, the Independent Battery was the only unit of the US Colored Troops to be commanded by Black officers rather than white officers during the Civil War. These officers were Captain H. Ford Douglas, Lieutenant William D. Matthews, and Lieutenant Patrick H. Minor.

The Independent Battery took part in the Battle of the Big Blue and the Battle of Westport in October 1864 during Price's Missouri Expedition. It was then tasked with guarding Fort Leavenworth, Kansas for the remainder of the war.

The other batteries were dispersed across the South and fought in various battles in different theaters. Although some batteries did fight as traditional mobile light artillery, others were tasked with guarding fortifications in the heavy artillery role. Battery A fought at the Battle of Nashville, Tennessee in December 1864, and Battery F fought at the Battle of Brice's Cross Roads, Mississippi in June 1864. Battery B was sent to guard the Mexican border in South Texas after the end of the war until March 1866. One section of Battery D, consisting of two cannons and 35 troops, was also present at the infamous Battle of Fort Pillow in April, 1864, where Black troops were summarily executed by Confederates after surrendering. Battery I joined Smith's Expedition to Tupelo in July 1864 at fought at the Battle of Tupelo in Mississippi later that month. Units of the 2nd Light Artillery also took part in the Battle of Big Creek in Arkansas in July 1864 (Battery E), and the Battle of Johnsonville (Battery A) in Tennessee in November 1864.

The batteries were mustered out of service individually from August 1865 through March 1866.

== Organization ==
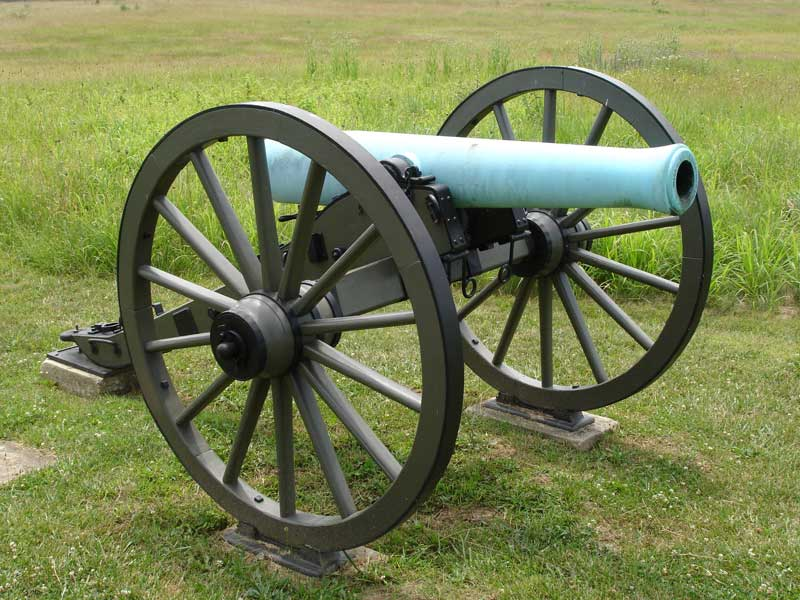
12-pounder Napoleon Cannon, of the type used by the 2nd Light Artillery Colored Troops Regiment.

Batteries of the 2nd Light Artillery, Colored Troops:

- Battery A, Tennessee
- Battery B, Virginia
- Battery C, Louisiana (formerly 1st Battery, Louisiana Light Artillery, African Descent)
- Battery D, Louisiana (formerly 2nd Battery, Louisiana Light Artillery, African Descent)
- Battery E, Louisiana (formerly 3rd Battery, Louisiana Light Artillery, African Descent)
- Battery F, Tennessee (formerly Memphis Light Battery, African Descent)
- Battery G, South Carolina
- Battery H, Arkansas (formerly 1st Arkansas Colored Light Artillery Battery)
- Battery I, Tennessee
- Independent Battery, Kansas

== See also ==
- List of United States Colored Troops Civil War units
- Field artillery in the American Civil War
