= State penitentiary =

State Penitentiary or State Pen may refer to one of various active and former penitentiaries within the United States:

- Anamosa State Penitentiary in Anamosa, Iowa
- Brushy Mountain State Penitentiary in Morgan County, Tennessee
- Colorado State Penitentiary
- Eastern State Penitentiary in Philadelphia, Pennsylvania
- Fox River State Penitentiary, a fictional penitentiary in the television series Prison Break
- Old Idaho State Penitentiary
- Iowa State Penitentiary
- Kentucky State Penitentiary
- Louisiana State Penitentiary
- Mississippi State Penitentiary
- Missouri State Penitentiary
- Nebraska State Penitentiary
- Penitentiary of New Mexico, also referred to as the New Mexico State Penitentiary
- North Dakota State Penitentiary
- Ohio State Penitentiary

- the defunct Ohio Penitentiary

- Oklahoma State Penitentiary
- Oregon State Penitentiary
- Río Piedras State Penitentiary in Puerto Rico
- South Dakota State Penitentiary
- Washington State Penitentiary
- West Tennessee State Penitentiary
- West Virginia State Penitentiary in Moundsville, West Virginia
- Wetumpka State Penitentiary, formerly Alabama State Penitentiary

== Film ==
- State Penitentiary (film), a 1950 drama directed by Lew Landers

== See also ==
- List of United States state prisons
