= Orysa, Tennessee =

- Unincorporated community
- Location within Tennessee Location within the United States
- Coordinates: 35°37′20″N 89°29′52″W
- Country: United States
- State: Tennessee
- County: Lauderdale
- Elevation: 315 ft (96 m)
- Time zone: UTC-6 (Central (CST))
  - Summer (DST): UTC-5 (CDT)
- Area code: 731
- GNIS feature ID: 1296499

Orysa (also Oryza) is an unincorporated community in Lauderdale County, Tennessee, United States.
