= 30th Missouri Infantry Regiment =

- Active: October 1862 to August 31, 1865
- Country: United States
- Allegiance: Union
- Branch: Infantry
- Engagements: Yazoo Pass Expedition; Battle of Chickasaw Bayou; Battle of Chickasaw Bluffs; Arkansas Post Expedition; Battle of Fort Hindman; Siege of Vicksburg May 19 & May 22 Assaults; Siege of Jackson; Battle of Vidalia, MS; Siege of Spanish Fort and Fort Blakeley; Assault on Fort Blakeley; Occupation of Mobile

The 30th Missouri Infantry Regiment, also known as the Shamrock Regiment, was an infantry regiment that served in the Union Army during the American Civil War. It was a sister unit to the 7th Missouri Infantry Regiment (the "Irish Seventh") and in 2022 was consolidated with a battalion of veteran volunteers of that regiment and operated as a "demi-brigade" known popularly as the "Missouri Irish Brigade".

== Service ==
The 30th Missouri Infantry Regiment, was organized at St. Louis Missouri in the autumn of 1862 and mustered in for three years service. It was often referred to as the "Shamrock Regiment" due to the large number of Irish immigrants who were enlisted in its ranks.

Organized at St. Louis, Mo., September and October, 1862. Attached to Cape Girardeau, Mo., Dept. of Missouri, to December 1862. 1st Brigade, 11th Division, Right Wing 13th Army Corps (Old), Department of the Tennessee, December 1862. 1st Brigade, 4th Division, Sherman's Yazoo Expedition, to January 1863. 1st Brigade, 1st Division, 15th Army Corps, Army of the Tennessee, to August 1863. Post of Vidalia, District of Natchez, Miss., Dept. of Tennessee, to April 1864. 1st Brigade, 1st Division, 17th Army Corps, Dept. of Tennessee, to August 1864. 1st Brigade, 2nd Division, 19th Army Corps, Dept. of the Gulf, to December 1864. 2nd Brigade, Reserve Division, Military Division West Mississippi, to February 1865. 3rd Brigade, 1st Division, Reserve Corps, Military Division West Mississippi, to February 1865. 3rd Brigade, 1st Division. 13th Army Corps (New), Military Division West Mississippi, to July 1865. Dept. of Texas to August 1865.

== Detailed service ==
Duty at Cape Girardeau, Mo., till November 10, 1862. Moved to Patterson, Missouri, November 10–17, and return to Cape Girardeau November 25–29. Moved to Helena, Ark., December 8–16. Sherman's Yazoo Expedition December 22, 1862, to January 3, 1863. Chickasaw Bayou December 26–28. Chickasaw Bluff December 29. Expedition to Arkansas Post, Ark., January 3–10, 1863. Assault and capture of Fort Hindman, Arkansas Post, January 10–11. Moved to Young's Point, La., January 17–23, and duty there till March. At Milliken's Bend, La., till April. Expedition to Greenville, Black Bayou and Deer Creek April 2–14. Demonstration on Haines' and Drumgould's Bluffs April 29-May 2. Moved to Join army in rear of Vicksburg, Mississippi, via Richmond and Grand Gulf, May 2–14. Jackson, Miss., May 14. Siege of Vicksburg, Miss., May 18-July 4. Assaults on Vicksburg May 19 and 22. Advance on Jackson, Miss., July 4–10. Siege of Jackson July 10–17. Ordered to District of Natchez, Miss., August 15. Assigned to garrison duty at post of Vidalia till April 1864. Action at Vidalia September 14, 1863. Expedition to Trinity November 15–16. Expedition to Tensas River February 2–3, 1864. Repulse of Gen. Polignac's threatened attack on Vidalia February 17, 1864. Expedition to Tensas River March 10–11. Moved to Vicksburg, Miss., April 3–5, and duty there till May 9. Expedition to Big Black River Bridge May 9–16. Camp at Vicksburg till July 1. Pearl River Expedition July 1–10. Guard pontoon train at Big Black River July 3–9. Moved to Morganza July 28–30, thence to Port Hudson, Louisiana, August 23–24. Expedition to Clinton August 24–27. Moved to Morganza August 28, and to mouth of White River, Ark., September 3–8. Duty there till October 18. Moved to Memphis, Tenn., October 18–19. At Fort Pickering, Memphis, till October 28. Moved to mouth of White River, Ark., October 28–29, thence to Duvall's Bluff, Ark., November 7–10, and to Memphis, Tenn., November 27-December 1. Consolidated to a Battalion of 4 Companies November 30. Moved to Kenner, La., January 2–8, 1865; thence to Dauphin Island February 11–18. Campaign against Mobile, Ala., and its Defences March 17-April 12. Siege of Spanish Fort and Fort Blakeley March 26-April 8. Assault and capture of Fort Blakeley April 9. Occupation of Mobile April 12, and camp there till May 10, and at Fort Blakeley and Fort Tracy till June 8. At Mobile till June 28. Moved to Galveston, Texas, June 28-July 1, thence to Columbus July 9–11. Post duty at Allayton till August 21. Mustered out at Columbus, Texas, August 31, and discharged at St. Louis, Mo., September 11, 1865.

== Casualties ==
Regiment lost during service 2 Officers and 10 Enlisted men killed and mortally wounded and 1 Officer and 280 Enlisted men by disease. Total 293.

== Commanders ==
- Colonel Bernard G. Farrar

== See also ==
- Missouri Civil War Union units
- Missouri in the Civil War
