= 11th United States Colored Infantry Regiment (New) =

1st Regiment Alabama Siege Artillery (African Descent) 6th U.S. Colored Heavy Artillery 7th U.S. Colored Heavy Artillery 11th United States Colored Infantry
- Active: June 20, 1863–March 11, 1864
- Disbanded: March 11, 1864
- Country: United States
- Allegiance: Union
- Branch: Union Army
- Type: Artillery
- Size: Regiment
- Engagements: American Civil War; Battle of Fort Pillow

Commanders
- Notable commanders: Col. Bernard G. Farrar Jr.

The 1st Regiment Alabama Siege Artillery (African Descent) was an artillery regiment recruited from African-Americans that served in the Union Army during the American Civil War. The regiment was renamed the 6th US Colored Heavy Artillery. Under the leadership of Major Lionel Booth, the regiment fought at the Battle of Fort Pillow on April 12, 1864. The regiment then became the 7th US Colored Heavy Artillery, and later the 11th United States Colored Infantry.

== Service ==
The 1st Alabama Siege Artillery Regiment was raised at LaGrange, LaFayette and Memphis, Tennessee, as well as Corinth, Mississippi, on June 20, 1863, after Federal troops occupied the area. In addition to artillery, the regiment also trained as infantry.

The unit was re-designated as 6th U.S. Colored Heavy Artillery Regiment on March 11, 1864. On March 17, Lieutenant-Colonel Thomas J. Jackson was placed in command of the regiment. The next day he turned the command over to newly promoted Major Lionel F. Booth. At that point the regiment had a strength of 8 officers and 213 men. It arrived at Fort Pillow on March 29 and Major Booth, being the senior officer present, was placed in command of the fort.

On April 12, the fort was attacked by approximately 1,500 Confederate troops led by General James R. Chalmers and Cavalry Corps commander, General Nathan B. Forrest. The battery took positions inside the inner fort walls. However, the Confederates had occupied the surrounding bluffs that allowed them to fire down into the fort. Early in the morning, Major Booth was shot by a Confederate sniper. The command of the fort fell to the in-experienced Major William F. Bradford, the commander of the 13th Tennessee Cavalry (US). The command of the 6th Heavy Artillery fell to Captain Charles Epeneter, who was wounded in the head.

The battery operated two 12-pound howitzers at the northern embrasures or openings in the parapet. Several days before the battle, two 10-pound Parrotts were brought to Fort Pillow. These pieces were placed outside the fort at the beginning of the battle, but were soon moved inside the fort. Wooden platforms were hastily erected adjacent to two open embrasures facing south. During the final assault on the fort, all Union artillery was largely ineffective because the guns could not be depressed enough to fire upon the Confederates on the steep terrain below. Two other cannons, 6-pound James Rifles, were placed in the center two embrasures and manned by a section of men from Company D, 2nd US Colored Light Artillery.

The regiment suffered many casualties at the battle but unlike many newspaper reports not all of the black soldiers were killed. Fifty-six were taken prisoner by the Confederates. Most of them were taken to Mississippi and Alabama and enslaved whereas the white prisoners from the 13th Tennessee Cavalry were sent to Andersonville Prison where a large percentage died. Several of the black prisoners escaped and many of those missing in action eventually returned to their unit.

After the losses at the Battle of Fort Pillow, the survivors were reformed into the 7th U.S. Colored Heavy Artillery Regiment on April 26, 1864, and later into the 11th United States Colored Infantry on January 23, 1865 (after the former regiment of the same name had been consolidated into the 113th United States Colored Infantry).

== See also ==
- Battle of Fort Pillow
- List of Alabama Union Civil War regiments
- List of Mississippi Union Civil War units
- List of United States Colored Troops Civil War units
