= Bernard Gaines Farrar Jr. =

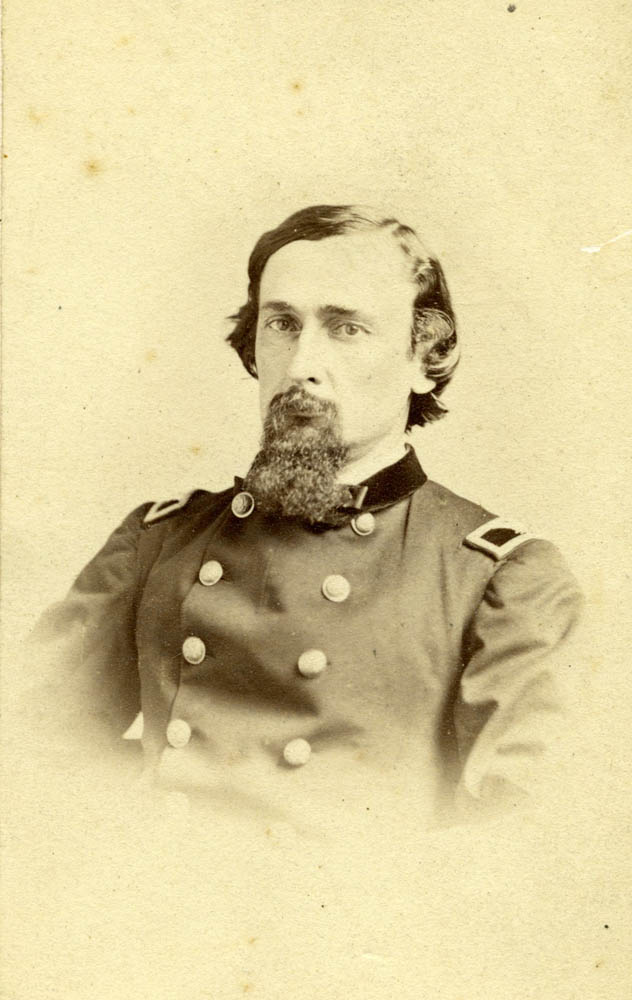
- Farrar in Brigadier General uniform
- Born: August 5, 1831; St. Louis, Missouri
- Died: June 6, 1916 (Age 84) St. Louis, Missouri
- Buried: Bellefontaine Cemetery, St. Louis
- Allegiance: United States of America; Union
- Branch: United States Army; Union Army
- Service years: 1861–1865
- Rank: Colonel; Brevet Brigadier general
- Commands: 30th Missouri Volunteer Infantry; 1st Brigade, 1st Division, XV Corps; 6th U.S. Colored Heavy Artillery
- Conflicts: American Civil War: Camp Jackson Affair; Battle of Wilson’s Creek; Siege of Vicksburg

Bernard Gaines Farrar Jr. (1831–1916) served in the American Civil War as an officer in the Union Army. Prior to his service, he was a businessman in St. Louis. Farrar Jr. began his military career on the staff of General Nathanial Lyon and then rose through the ranks until he was brevetted Brigadier-General. Following his time in the military he returned to St. Louis where he was involved in politics and known as a prominent leader in the St. Louis community.

== Early life ==
Farrar was born August 5, 1831, in St. Louis, Missouri, to Bernard Gaines Farrar, Sr. and Ann O’Fallon Clark Thruston. His father was the first doctor of American descent to set up permanent residence west of the Mississippi, and his mother was the niece of William Clark. Farrar Jr. studied at St. Louis University, Norwich Military Academy of Vermont, and the University of Virginia. After completing his education, he returned to St. Louis. He began his career in local business ventures and real estate. On June 14, 1852, Farrar married Isabel Jerdone Mitchell. The Farrars had four children: Alexander Mitchell Farrar, Frank Jerdone Farrar, Ann Clark Thruston Farrar and Bertie Cecil Farrar.

== Military career ==
In 1861, Farrar enlisted in the Union Army. That May, just as the American Civil War broke out, he was appointed as an aide-de-camp for General Nathaniel Lyon. Early in his service under Lyon, Farrar engaged in a campaign to oust Missouri’s pro-Confederate government. He was also an active participant in the Camp Jackson Affair, personally sent to Confederate General Frost delivering the message to surrender. After the Battle of Wilson’s Creek and General Lyon's death, Farrar was appointed to the staff of General Henry Halleck in October 1861. Farrar served as Provost Marshal of the Department of the Missouri until October 1862. Then he organized the 30th Missouri Volunteer Infantry and became its Colonel. Serving under General Ulysses S. Grant in the Mississippi River campaigns; he commanded Francis P. Blair's Brigade in the Siege of Vicksburg. Afterwards he formed an all-black regiment which would later become the 6th U.S. Colored Heavy Artillery. Farrar later commanded the District of Natchez, and was brevetted Brigadier-General on March 9, 1865.

== Post-military life ==
In May 1865, Farrar resigned from the military and came back to reside in St. Louis. A vocal Republican, he served as a representative in Missouri and was appointed by President Harrison as Missouri’s Assistant U.S. Treasurer, a position he held for four years. Farrar died on June 6, 1916. He is buried at Bellefontaine Cemetery in St. Louis, Missouri.
