= Cherry, Tennessee =

- Unincorporated community
- Location within Tennessee Location within the United States
- Coordinates: 35°40′36″N 89°42′30″W
- Country: United States
- State: Tennessee
- County: Lauderdale
- Elevation: 292 ft (89 m)
- Time zone: UTC-6 (Central (CST))
  - Summer (DST): UTC-5 (CDT)
- Area code: 731
- GNIS feature ID: 1280329

Cherry is an unincorporated community in Lauderdale County, Tennessee, United States. It is located at the intersection of Tennessee State Route 87 and Tennessee State Route 371. Cherry is composed of some churches, a few small businesses, homes, and farms.
