= Lionel F. Booth =

Union officer during the American Civil War (1838-1864)

George H. Lanning (1838 – April 12, 1864), also known by his alias Lionel F. Booth, was a battalion commander of the 6th U.S. Regiment Colored Heavy Artillery in the Union Army during the American Civil War.

Lanning first enrolled as a private in the 2nd Infantry Regiment, Company B. He served in St. Louis, Missouri at Jefferson Barracks, where he met Lizzie Way, and married her in September 1861 – signing the marriage certificate as George H. Lanning. It is said that he was working as a clerk for General Nathaniel Lyon at the Battle of Wilson's Creek.

In 1863, he was promoted to captain and given command to "A"-company of 6th U.S. Colored Heavy Artillery Regiment. Later he was promoted to major and given command of a battalion of said regiment which manned the Fort Pillow post. Because of his order of precedence he too was promoted to post commander. He was killed in action on April 12, 1864, at the Battle of Fort Pillow.

Although it is unknown what led Lanning to use an alias, aliases were common in the Civil War, often used to prevent people's families from finding them. Lanning was additionally estranged from a number of people in his family; in his widow's pension file, Lanning remarks to his aunt about his deceased parents in Iowa:

... had it not been for them and their father I might have been a different and a better man, but let it rest as it is. I forgive and with him let all his injuries and faults be buried with them that remain let their faults be buried in oblivion. I forgive them, it was them that caused me to be driven from the presence of those who needed my protection, and they knew it, that if they got me once out of the way they would have things their own way.
