= John Henry Barbee =

American blues singer and guitarist (1905–1964)

John Henry Barbee (November 14, 1905 – November 3, 1964) was an American blues singer and guitarist. He was born in Henning, Tennessee. He claimed that he was born William George Tucker and that he changed his name with the commencement of his recording career, in tribute to his favorite folk song, "The Ballad of John Henry", but this claim is not supported by census records, in which he is registered as the son of Beecher Barbee and Cora Gilford.

== Biography ==
Barbee toured in the 1930s throughout the American South, singing and playing slide guitar. He teamed up with Big Joe Williams and, later, with Sunnyland Slim in Memphis, Tennessee. Travelling down to Mississippi, he met Sonny Boy Williamson and played with him off and on for several years. He released two sides for Vocalion Records in 1939 ("Six Weeks Old Blues" and "God Knows I Can't Help It"). The record sold well enough to cause Vocalion to call on Barbee again, but by that time he had left his last known whereabouts in Arkansas. Barbee explained that this sudden move was due to his evading the law for shooting and killing his girlfriend's lover. He later found out that he had only injured the man, but by the time this was discovered, Barbee was no longer making a career playing music.

Barbee did not show up again in the music industry until the early 1960s, when a revival of interest in the blues was at its height. Willie Dixon searched for Barbee and found him working as an ice-cream server in Chicago, Illinois. In 1964, Barbee joined the American Folk Blues Festival on a European tour with other blues players, including Lightnin' Hopkins and Howlin' Wolf.

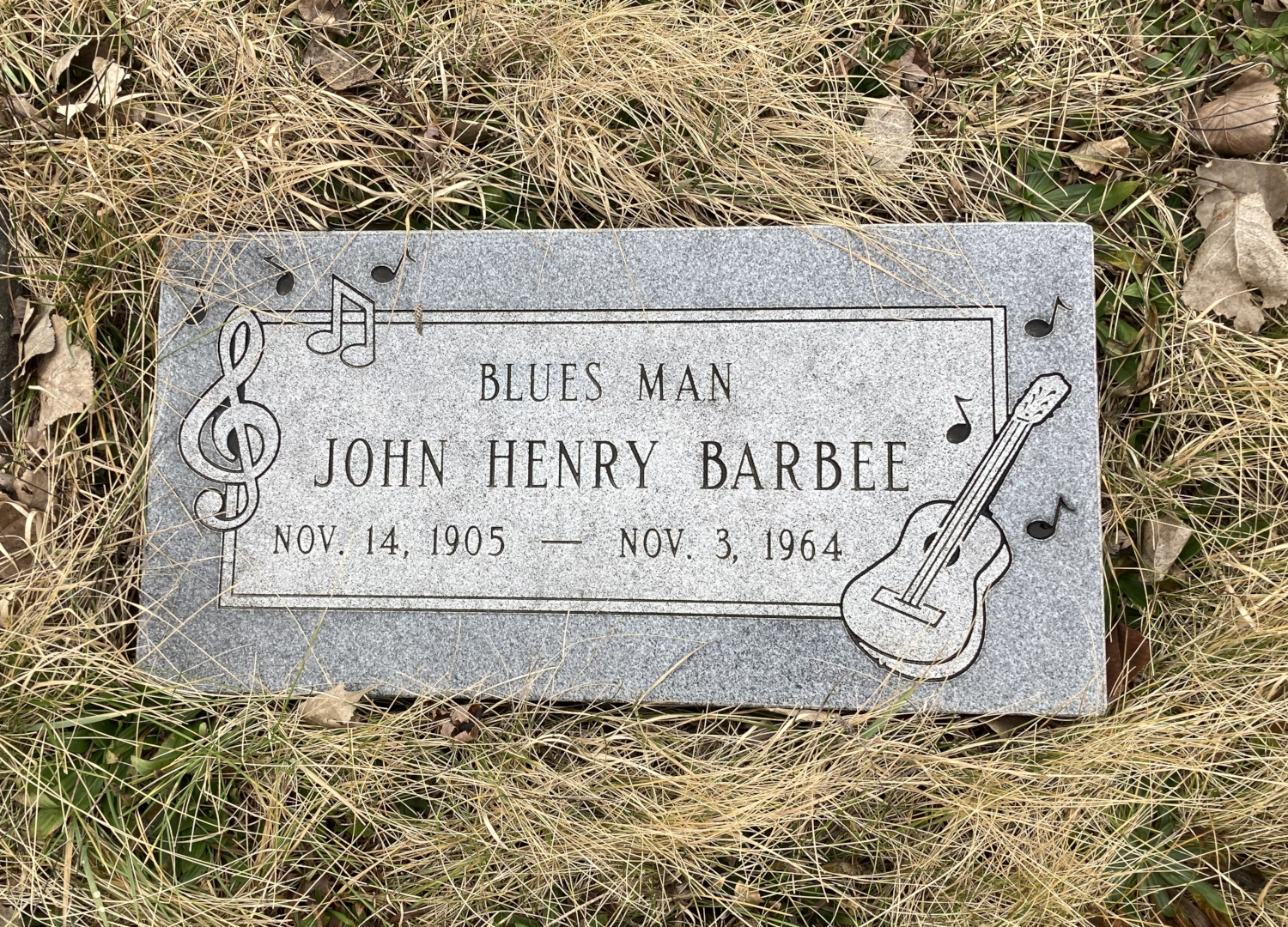
Barbee's grave at Restvale Cemetery

Barbee returned to the United States after getting diagnosed with a severe form of cancer, and used the money from the tour to purchase his first automobile. Ten days after buying the car, he accidentally ran over and killed a man. He was taken to a Chicago jail and died there of a heart attack a few days later, on November 3, 1964, 11 days before his 59th birthday. He is interred in the Restvale Cemetery, in Alsip, Illinois.

The third annual White Lake Blues Festival, held at the Howmet Playhouse Theater in Whitehall, Michigan, on May 11, 2010, was organized by executive producer Steve Salter, of the nonprofit organization Killer Blues, to raise monies to honor Barbee's unmarked grave with a headstone. The event was a success, and a stone was placed in June 2010.

== Discography ==
- Portraits in Blues, vol. 9 (Storyville, 1964), studio album
- Blues Live! 1964, (Storyville, 1985), split album with live shows by Barbee and Sleepy John Estes
- Blues Masters, vol. 3 (Storyville, 1994), compilation

== See also ==
- List of blues musicians
- List of country blues musicians
- List of Delta blues musicians

== Other sources ==
- Oliver, Paul; Albertson, Chris (1964, 1981). LP liner notes. I Ain't Gonna Pick No More Cotton. Blues Roots, vol. 3. Storyville SLP 4037.
