= Durhamville, Tennessee =

- Unincorporated community
- Location of Durhamville in Tennessee
- Country: United States
- State: Tennessee
- Counties: Lauderdale
- Elevation: 335 ft (102 m)
- Time zone: UTC-6 (CST)
  - Summer (DST): UTC-5 (CDT)
- ZIP code: 38063 (Ripley, Tennessee)
- GNIS feature ID: 1283234

Durhamville is a rural unincorporated community in Lauderdale County, Tennessee, United States. Durhamville is the second oldest town in Lauderdale County. It was founded by Colonel Thomas Durham in 1829 or 1830. Thomas Durham owned a store in the town since 1826.

Blues guitarist Sleepy John Estes is buried at Elam Baptist Church Cemetery in Durhamville.

== History ==
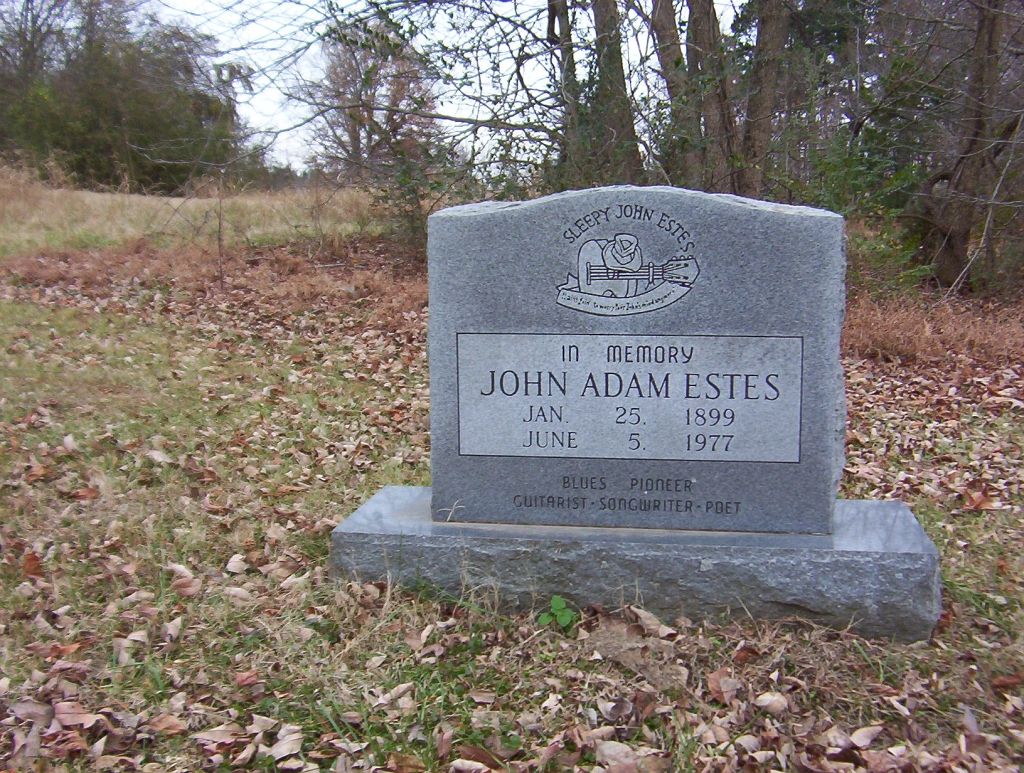
Grave of Sleepy John Estes

=== Civil War ===
During the American Civil War, a detachment of the 52nd Indiana Volunteer Infantry engaged Confederate troops at Durhamville in 1862. One Union Army soldier was killed and ten wounded, eight Confederate soldiers were killed.

=== Blues ===
Sleepy John Estes was a U.S. blues guitarist, songwriter and vocalist, born in Ripley, Lauderdale County. He died on June 5, 1977, in his home of 17 years in Brownsville, Haywood County, Tennessee. Sleepy John Estes is buried at Elam Baptist Church Cemetery in Durhamville.

== Geography ==
Durhamville is located at 35.667°N 89.493°W. The settlement is situated on the southeastern edge of the New Madrid Seismic Zone, an area with a high earthquake risk.

== Economy ==
Agriculture is the dominant source of income in the area surrounding Durhamville, especially the cultivation of cotton.

After the abolition of slavery, sharecropping was the primary means of income for low income families in the area. Mostly for the cultivation of cotton, land would be used by sharecroppers in return for a share of the crop to the landowner. Modern machines such as the cotton picker have made the manual cultivation obsolete over time as they took over the work from manual laborers.

As of 2008, there were no industries in Durhamville; some of its houses are abandoned; and as an unincorporated community, it has no defined boundaries.

== Notable person ==
- James Peter Walker (1851–1890), U.S. Representative from Missouri, attended the public schools and the boys' college at Durhamville.

== See also ==
- Battle of Fort Pillow
- Troop engagements of the American Civil War, 1862
