= USS New Era =

Gunboat of the United States Navy

History

United States
- Launched: 1862
- Acquired: 27 October 1862
- Commissioned: December 1862
- Decommissioned: 28 June 1865
- Fate: Sold, 17 August 1865

General characteristics
- Displacement: 157 tons
- Length: 137 ft 1 in (41.78 m)
- Beam: 29 ft 6 in (8.99 m)
- Draft: 4 ft (1.2 m)
- Depth of hold: 4 ft 6 in (1.37 m)
- Propulsion: steam engine; stern wheel-propelled
- Armament: 6 × 24-pounder howitzers

USS New Era was a steamer acquired by the Union Navy during the American Civil War. She was used by the Union Navy as a gunboat in support of the Union Navy blockade of Confederate waterways. New Era was also a name initially carried (until 1861) by a timberclad (later ironclad) USS Essex.

== Service history ==
New Era, a wooden stern-wheel steamer built at Wellsville, Ohio, in 1862, operated on the Ohio River out of Pittsburgh, Pennsylvania, until purchased by the Navy at Cincinnati, Ohio, 27 October 1862. It was commissioned at St. Louis, Missouri, in December 1862, with Acting Master Frank W. F. Flanner in command. New Era arrived off Columbus, Kentucky, 24 December 1862 to support the Union army garrison there threatened by a large Confederate force. Confederate possession of Columbus would have seriously disrupted the flow of supplies to the Union fleet and troops then operating against Vicksburg, Mississippi. When the threat subsided, she returned to Cairo, Illinois.

On 3 January 1863 she headed downstream again and the next day, with ten other Union gunboats, got underway up the White River in Arkansas, with Union army troops under Gen. William Tecumseh Sherman, to capture Fort Hindman. On 11 January, Rear Adm. David Dixon Porter ordered New Era to take on board, from Baron de Kalb and Cincinnati, men wounded during the expedition for transportation to a hospital ship at the mouth of the White River; then to proceed to Island No. 10 to relieve Carondelet.

New Era was next stationed near Island No. 10 inspecting river boats out of St. Louis, Missouri, and other Northern ports to prevent illegal trade with the Confederacy. She captured steamer W. A. Knapp carrying a contraband cargo on 4 February and took steamers Rowena and White Cloud under similar circumstances on 13 February. Curlew became her prize on the last day of the month. Acting Lt. Henry A. Glassford relieved Executive Officer William C. Hansford of command 4 March; and New Era captured steamer Ruth carrying contraband and Confederate mail on 12 March. Besides taking ships, she also made frequent arrests of smugglers, subversive agents, and other lawbreakers. Her duty on the upper Mississippi River bore striking resemblance to that of ships on "Operation Market Time" patrol off Vietnam more than a century later. On 16 June 1863, New Era proceeded to a point above Island No. 10 to destroy nine boats and barges collected there for a Confederate attack on the island.

The New Era saw action again on 12 April 1864, when she opened fire on Confederate cavalry under Major General Nathan Bedford Forrest. Forrest's troopers were attempting to capture the small Federal garrison of Fort Pillow. The New Era added her guns to the defense of the fort until fire from Confederate sharpshooters forced the vessel to "button up" her gun ports. Though Fort Pillow was captured by the Confederates, and a large portion of its USCT garrison were massacred, New Era remained in the area to pick up survivors of the battle. Over the next two days, the gunboat continued to intermittently shell the woods near Fort Pillow, to dissuade the Confederates from establishing a battery or burning a number of barges along the river bank. New Era's crew also assisted in burying many of the dead from Fort Pillow. When Confederate forces left the area on 14 April, the New Era steamed back north toward Island No. 10, with civilian and military survivors of the Fort Pillow massacre. Through the remainder of the war, the steamer operated on the upper Mississippi and its tributaries, protecting Union communications on the waterways. She decommissioned at Mound City, Illinois, 28 June 1865 and was sold at auction there to W. S. Mepham 17 August 1865.

== See also ==
- Anaconda Plan
- Mississippi Squadron
