= 1st Arkansas Colored Light Artillery Battery =

- 35 Star Flag 1863-1865
- Active: June 4, 1864–August 10, 1865
- Disbanded: August 10, 1865
- Country: United States
- Allegiance: Union
- Branch: Artillery
- Size: battery
- Engagements: American Civil War: Prior Creek

The 1st Arkansas Colored Light Artillery Battery was an artillery battery that served in the Union Army during the American Civil War. The regiment was composed of African American enlisted men commanded by white officers and was authorized by the Bureau of Colored Troops which was created by the United States War Department on May 22, 1863.

== Organization ==
The 1st Arkansas Colored Light Artillery Battery was organized at Pine Bluff, Arkansas, on June 4, 1864. Then unit was re-designated as Battery "H", 2nd Regiment Light Artillery U.S. Colored Troops on December 13, 1864. Mustered out on August 10, 1865.

== Service ==
The battery was assigned to garrison duty at Pine Bluff, Ark. 7th Army Corps, Dept. of Arkansas, till December, 1864. The battery saw action at Prior Creek on September 18, 1864. The battery was involved in the Expedition to Mount Elba, Ark., and the skirmish at Saline River, January 22-February 4, 1865.

== Mustered out of service ==
Mustered out on August 10, 1865.

== See also ==
- List of Arkansas Civil War Union units
- List of United States Colored Troops Civil War Units
- United States Colored Troops
- Arkansas in the American Civil War
