= Cold Creek Correctional Facility =

Prison in Tennessee, United States

Coordinates: 35°39′48″N 89°44′25″W

- Interactive map of Cold Creek Correctional Facility
- Location: Lauderdale County, Tennessee, US
- Status: Closed
- Opened: December 1937
- Closed: 1999
- Former name: Fort Pillow Prison and Farm; West Tennessee High Security Facility
- Managed by: Tennessee Department of Correction

Cold Creek Correctional Facility (CCCF) was a Tennessee Department of Correction prison located in unincorporated Lauderdale County, Tennessee, near Henning. CCCF is now the West Tennessee State Penitentiary (WTSP) Site #2. The prison facility was previously named the West Tennessee High Security Facility and the Fort Pillow State Prison and Farm.

The Fort Pillow Prison and Farm originally opened in December 1937. As of July 13, 1998 the institution supported a 6,000 acres (2,400 ha) farming operation. In 1999 the Cold Creek Correctional Facility closed. CCCF was replaced by a medium security complex built next to the West Tennessee High Security Facility (WTHSF). The two complexes and the CCCF minimum security annex were operationally combined and became the WTSP.

Musician Steve Earle performed a concert at Cold Creek in June 1996 as part of a parole agreement after he was jailed for drug offenses the previous year. The concert was filmed as a MTV special, To Hell and Back, which was later released on DVD as part of a box set in July 2013.
