= Pillowfort =

American microblogging and social networking website

- Final logo since August 2022
- Company type: Limited liability company
- Founded: February 3, 2017; 9 years ago
- Headquarters: Austin, Texas, United States
- Founder: Julia Baritz
- Industry: Blogging, social networking service
- Website: pillowfort.social

Pillowfort is an American social media networking service and blogging website. The website was launched in 2017 in open beta. It grew to 20,000 members in the first two and a half years then more quickly in 2018. As of October 2020, the site had more than 100,000 users.

On October 19, 2026, Pillowfort announced that it would be closing December 4, 2026.

The website was popular among fandoms, LGBTQ people, and adult content creators.

== Features ==
Pillowfort was created to combine features from platforms such as Livejournal, Twitter, and Tumblr. Registered users of the website may create, reblog, and comment on posts, as well as follow individual users or "community" groups. Posts may contain text, images, or embedded elements.

- User page – Each user has a publicly viewable blog page whose content they control.
- Home feed – Each user has a personal scrolling feed of content determined by who they follow and what communities they belong to and have chosen to watch.
- Sidebar – A pop-out sidebar shows counts of a person's followers and mutuals (those also followed by the person) and allows messaging, posting, and access to communities and search functions.
- Tags – All posts can have tags to help with navigation and that enable them to be searched for. Tags are also used for blacklisting.
- Content control – Users can block commenting, reblogging, or viewing of their posts on a post-by-post basis.
- User-created communities – Users can form communities with other members, which anyone can join to view and post or reblog to a 'communal home feed'.
- NSFW content filtering – A NSFW toggle is present in each post. Members can set preferences so as not to see NSFW posts.
- Blacklisting and blocking – Individuals can be blocked so that their posts and messages are not visible. Tags can be blacklisted so posts with them are not seen.

== History ==
Former logo from November 2019 to August 2022

Pillowfort was founded by Julia Baritz, who began advertising the project with a business partner on Tumblr in 2015. An Indiegogo campaign for the site successfully reached its goal in 2016, allowing for the first wave of beta users to register in 2017. Further funds were raised through a Kickstarter campaign in 2018.

After the social media platform Tumblr changed its content policy in 2018, greatly limiting mature works, a large number of users migrated to Pillowfort, which had more accepting terms regarding mature content and a greater ability to filter said content. Registrations had to be temporarily closed as the site received a tenfold increase in traffic and over 8,000 new registration requests, causing infrastructural instability.

In 2019, Pillowfort migrated from the .io domain to .social due to the site's hosting of sexual content, which is disallowed by the .io registrar. Because Pillowfort allows adult content, PayPal ended their business relationship with them.

When free public registration was opened on 25 January 2021, new users found and exploited security-related bugs on the website. Pillowfort was taken offline for three months while the staff fixed the vulnerabilities which were uncovered, and reopened without free public registration.

As of January 2022, new users can still register by being invited by an existing member or purchasing a registration key. The developers added an automated rolling waitlist in 2022.

On October 19, 2026, Pillowfort announced that it would be closing December 4, 2026.
