= Lower Hatchie National Wildlife Refuge =

- IUCN category IV (habitat/species management area)
- Location within the United States
- Location: Lauderdale, Tipton counties, Tennessee, United States
- Nearest city: Gilt Edge, Tennessee
- Coordinates: 35°35′00″N 89°52′00″W
- Area: 9,451 acres (38.25 km^{2})
- Established: 1980
- Governing body: U.S. Fish and Wildlife Service
- Website: Lower Hatchie National Wildlife Refuge

Lower Hatchie National Wildlife Refuge, part of the U.S. National Wildlife Refuge system, is a 9,451-acre (38.25 km^{2}) area of wetlands associated with the confluence of the Hatchie River and the Forked Deer River in West Tennessee near the confluence of the Hatchie River with the Mississippi River. Located in parts of southwestern Lauderdale and northern Tipton counties, it is a rich environment for both aquatic life and waterfowl.
