= Lauderdale County, Tennessee =

County in Tennessee, United States

- County
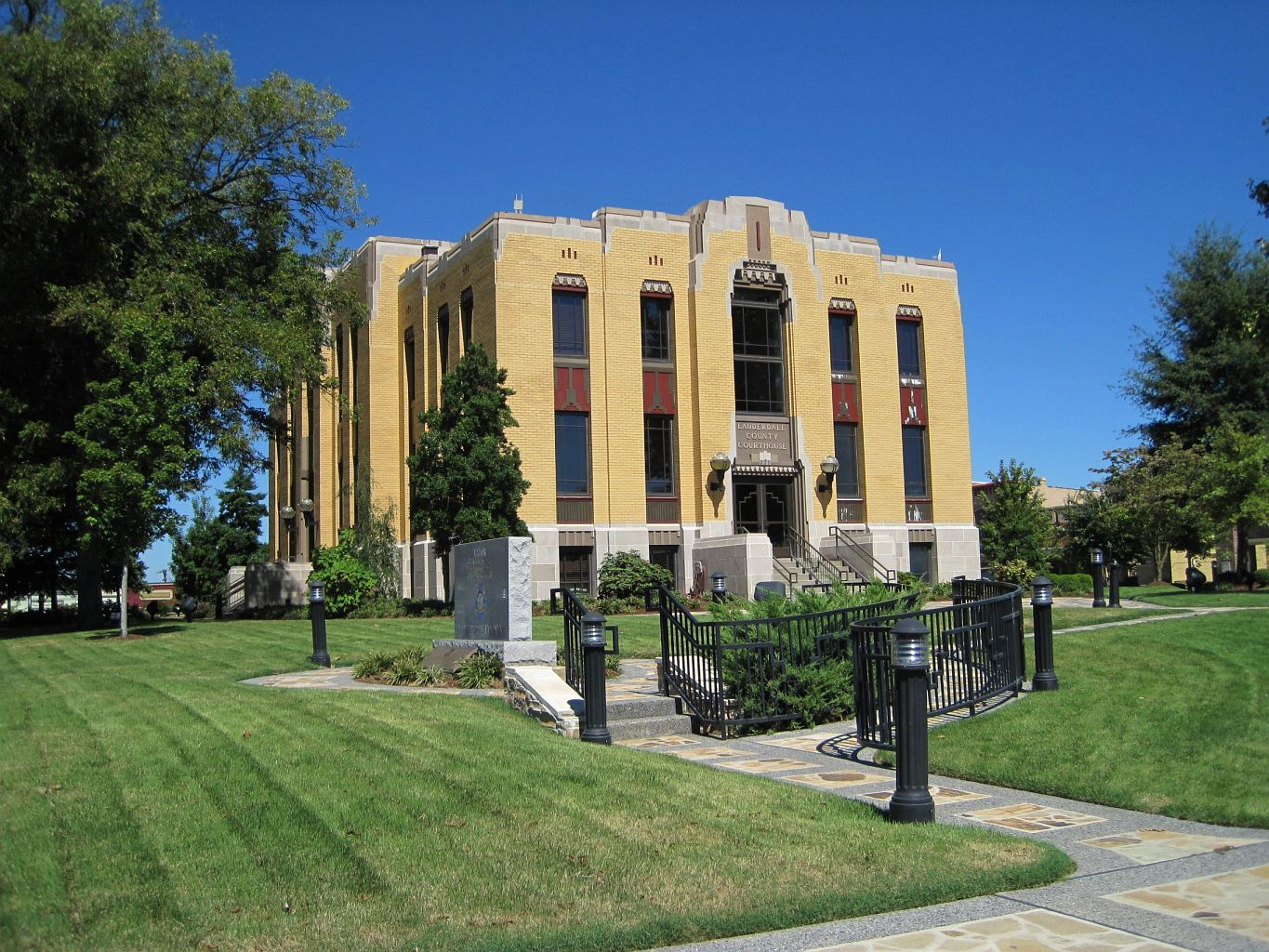
- Lauderdale County Courthouse in Ripley

- Flag Seal

- Location within the U.S. state of Tennessee
- Coordinates: 35°46′N 89°38′W
- Country: United States
- State: Tennessee
- Founded: 1835
- Named for: James Lauderdale
- Seat: Ripley
- Largest city: Ripley

Area
  - Total: 508 sq mi (1,320 km^{2})
  - Land: 472 sq mi (1,220 km^{2})
  - Water: 36 sq mi (93 km^{2}) 7.0%

Population (2020)
  - Total: 25,143
  - Estimate (2025): 24,617 ▼
  - Density: 59/sq mi (23/km^{2})
- Time zone: UTC−6 (Central)
  - Summer (DST): UTC−5 (CDT)
- Congressional district: 8th
- Website: lauderdaletn.com

Lauderdale County is a county located on the western edge of the U.S. state of Tennessee, with its border the Mississippi River. As of the 2020 census, the population was 25,143. Its county seat is Ripley. Since the antebellum years, it has been developed for cotton as a major commodity crop.

== History ==
Lauderdale County was created in 1835 from parts of Tipton, Dyer and Haywood counties. It was named for Lieutenant Colonel James Lauderdale, who was killed at the Battle of New Orleans in the War of 1812. Planters developed large cotton plantations along the waterways, and used enslaved African Americans in gangs to work and process this commodity crop. After the American Civil War, many freedmen initially stayed in the area, working the land as sharecroppers or tenant farmers. Whites used violence to enforce white supremacy after the war, continuing after Reconstruction. In the period after Reconstruction and into the early 20th century, whites in Lauderdale County committed eight lynchings of Black people. This was the fifth-highest total of any county in the state, but three other counties also had eight lynchings each in this period.

=== Battle of Fort Pillow ===
In 1861, the Confederate States Army built extensive defensive fortifications in Lauderdale County along the Mississippi River and named the site for General Gideon J. Pillow. Because of its strategic location, the fort was taken over by the Union Army in 1864, which had occupied the state since 1862.

In 1864, Confederates attacked and overran the fort's Union defenders, who were about evenly split between white and black soldiers. They were reported to have refused to surrender, but historians have disputed this account. The Confederates gave the soldiers no quarter, and killed black soldiers in twice the proportion of white ones. After the Union Army established the United States Colored Troops (USCT), made up of numerous recruits who were escaped slaves, Southern military officials vowed to kill them rather than take them prisoner. People in the North considered this event to be a massacre, and blacks in the Union Army used the cry, "Remember Fort Pillow!" to rally during the remainder of the war.

Fort Pillow State Park has a museum to interpret the battle and also has reconstructed fortifications on the original site of the fort.

== Geography ==
According to the U.S. Census Bureau, the county has a total area of 508 square miles (1,320 km^{2}), of which 472 square miles (1,220 km^{2}) is land and 36 square miles (93 km^{2}) (7.0%) is water. The county's western boundary is formed by the Mississippi River, its northern boundary with Dyer County is formed by the Forked Deer River, and its southern boundary with Haywood County is formed by the Hatchie River.

Lauderdale County is situated on the southeastern edge of the New Madrid Seismic Zone, an area with a high earthquake risk.

=== Adjacent counties ===
- Dyer County (north)
- Crockett County (east)
- Haywood County (southeast)
- Tipton County (south)
- Mississippi County, Arkansas (west)

=== National protected areas ===
- Chickasaw National Wildlife Refuge
- Lower Hatchie National Wildlife Refuge (part)

=== State protected areas ===
- Cold Creek Wildlife Management Area
- Fort Pillow State Park
- Alex Haley House and Museum (state historic site)
- Sunk Lake State Natural Area
- John Tully State Forest
- John Tully Wildlife Management Area

=== Major roads ===
- Future Interstate 69
- U.S. Highway 51
- Tennessee State Route 19 (Tina Turner Highway)
- Tennessee State Route 87
- Tennessee State Route 88
- Tennessee State Route 180
- Tennessee State Route 181
- Tennessee State Route 371

== Demographics ==
Historical population
Census	Pop.	Note	%±
1840	3,435		—
1850	5,169		50.5%
1860	7,559		46.2%
1870	10,838		43.4%
1880	14,918		37.6%
1890	18,756		25.7%
1900	21,971		17.1%
1910	21,105		−3.9%
1920	21,494		1.8%
1930	23,406		8.9%
1940	24,461		4.5%
1950	25,047		2.4%
1960	21,844		−12.8%
1970	20,271		−7.2%
1980	24,555		21.1%
1990	23,491		−4.3%
2000	27,101		15.4%
2010	27,815		2.6%
2020	25,143		−9.6%
2025 (est.)	24,617	▼	−2.1%
U.S. Decennial Census; 1790-1960 1900-1990; 1990-2000 2010-2020 2020

=== 2020 census ===
Lauderdale County racial composition
Race	Num.	Perc.
White (non-Hispanic)	15,016	59.72%
Black or African American (non-Hispanic)	8,385	33.35%
Native American	133	0.53%
Asian	53	0.21%
Other/Mixed	969	3.85%
Hispanic or Latino	587	2.33%

As of the 2020 census, there were 25,143 people, 9,583 households, and 6,753 families residing in the county. The median age was 40.0 years, with 21.9% of residents under the age of 18 and 16.9% 65 years of age or older. For every 100 females there were 92.1 males, and for every 100 females age 18 and over there were 88.2 males.

Of the 9,583 households, 30.2% had children under the age of 18 living in them; 38.5% were married-couple households, 19.9% were households with a male householder and no spouse or partner present, and 34.8% were households with a female householder and no spouse or partner present. About 30.6% of all households were made up of individuals and 13.5% had someone living alone who was 65 years of age or older.

There were 10,653 housing units, of which 10.0% were vacant. Among occupied housing units, 61.1% were owner-occupied and 38.9% were renter-occupied. The homeowner vacancy rate was 1.2% and the rental vacancy rate was 6.7%.

27.5% of residents lived in urban areas, while 72.5% lived in rural areas.

=== 2000 census ===
As of the census of 2000, there were 27,101 people, 9,567 households, and 6,811 families residing in the county. The population density was 58 people per square mile (22 people/km^{2}). There were 10,563 housing units at an average density of 22 units per square mile (8.5/km^{2}). The racial makeup of the county was 63.82% White, 34.08% Black or African American, 0.62% Native American, 0.16% Asian, 0.02% Pacific Islander, 0.52% from other races, and 0.78% from two or more races. 1.16% of the population were Hispanic or Latino of any race.

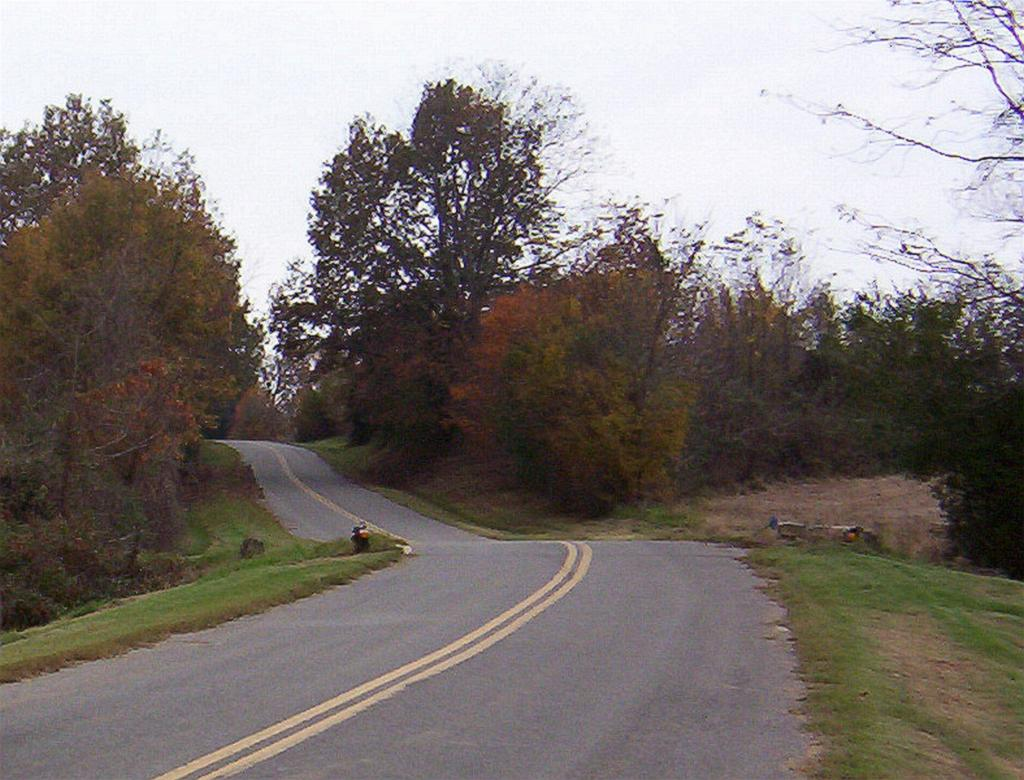
Scenic view in Lauderdale County (2004)

There were 9,567 households, out of which 32.80% had children under the age of 18 living with them, 49.70% were married couples living together, 17.60% had a female householder with no husband present, and 28.80% were non-families. 25.60% of all households were made up of individuals, and 11.10% had someone living alone who was 65 years of age or older. The average household size was 2.55 and the average family size was 3.06.

In the county, the population was spread out, with 24.80% under the age of 18, 10.30% from 18 to 24, 31.20% from 25 to 44, 21.70% from 45 to 64, and 12.10% who were 65 years of age or older. The median age was 35 years. For every 100 females there were 108.10 males. For every 100 females age 18 and over, there were 109.00 males.

The median income for a household in the county was $29,751, and the median income for a family was $36,841. Males had a median income of $28,325 versus $21,238 for females. The per capita income for the county was $13,682. About 16.20% of families and 19.20% of the population were below the poverty line, including 24.70% of those under age 18 and 26.50% of those age 65 or over.

== Culture ==
=== Sleepy John Estes ===
Sleepy John Estes was a U.S. blues guitarist, songwriter and vocalist, born in Ripley, Tennessee. He died on June 5, 1977, in his home of 17 years in Brownsville, Haywood County, Tennessee. Sleepy John is buried at Elam Baptist Church Cemetery in Durhamville, Lauderdale County.

=== Veterans' Museum in Halls ===
The Veterans' Museum on the grounds of the former Dyersburg Army Air Base in Halls is dedicated to the preservation and documentation of materials related to military activities from World War I to the present day wars and conflicts, as well as documenting the history of the air base itself.

== Government and infrastructure ==
United States presidential election results for Lauderdale County, Tennessee
Year	Republican		Democratic		Third party(ies)	
Year	No.	%	No.	%	No.	%
1912	186	10.18%	1,020	55.83%	621	33.99%
1916	532	25.26%	1,572	74.64%	2	0.09%
1920	1,190	33.97%	2,313	66.03%	0	0.00%
1924	242	12.96%	1,596	85.44%	30	1.61%
1928	430	13.32%	2,798	86.68%	0	0.00%
1932	174	7.40%	2,137	90.94%	39	1.66%
1936	203	5.41%	3,540	94.27%	12	0.32%
1940	317	4.80%	6,279	95.09%	7	0.11%
1944	381	9.25%	3,732	90.65%	4	0.10%
1948	298	7.68%	2,556	65.89%	1,025	26.42%
1952	1,390	24.26%	4,340	75.74%	0	0.00%
1956	1,049	18.94%	4,383	79.12%	108	1.95%
1960	1,322	27.36%	3,462	71.65%	48	0.99%
1964	1,880	32.83%	3,847	67.17%	0	0.00%
1968	1,080	15.99%	2,108	31.21%	3,566	52.80%
1972	3,597	64.40%	1,771	31.71%	217	3.89%
1976	2,105	30.61%	4,747	69.03%	25	0.36%
1980	2,818	38.95%	4,318	59.68%	99	1.37%
1984	3,566	50.23%	3,506	49.39%	27	0.38%
1988	3,308	49.83%	3,296	49.65%	35	0.53%
1992	2,928	36.79%	4,452	55.94%	578	7.26%
1996	2,481	34.63%	4,349	60.71%	334	4.66%
2000	3,329	43.70%	4,224	55.45%	65	0.85%
2004	4,164	47.96%	4,474	51.53%	44	0.51%
2008	4,933	52.83%	4,322	46.28%	83	0.89%
2012	4,616	53.12%	4,011	46.16%	62	0.71%
2016	4,884	60.39%	3,056	37.79%	147	1.82%
2020	5,674	63.29%	3,193	35.62%	98	1.09%
2024	5,633	68.15%	2,571	31.10%	62	0.75%

The Tennessee Department of Corrections operates the West Tennessee State Penitentiary in unincorporated Lauderdale County, near Henning. Previously the Cold Creek Correctional Facility was located in the area.

== Communities ==
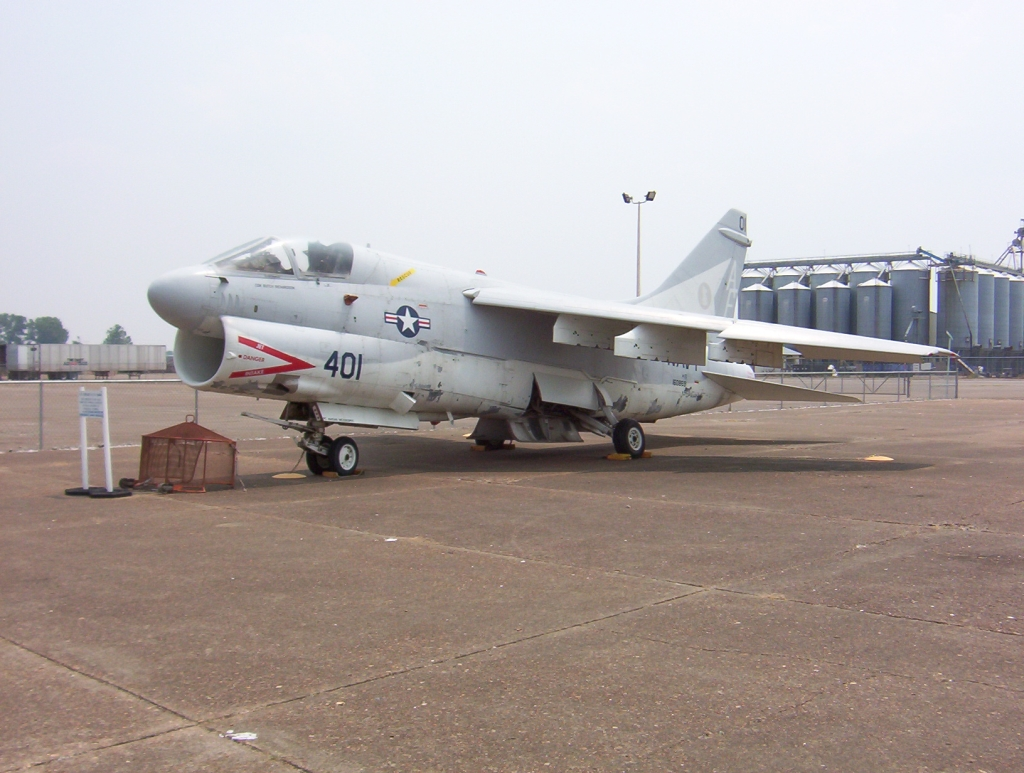
A-7 Corsair II in front of the Veterans' Museum in Halls (2006)

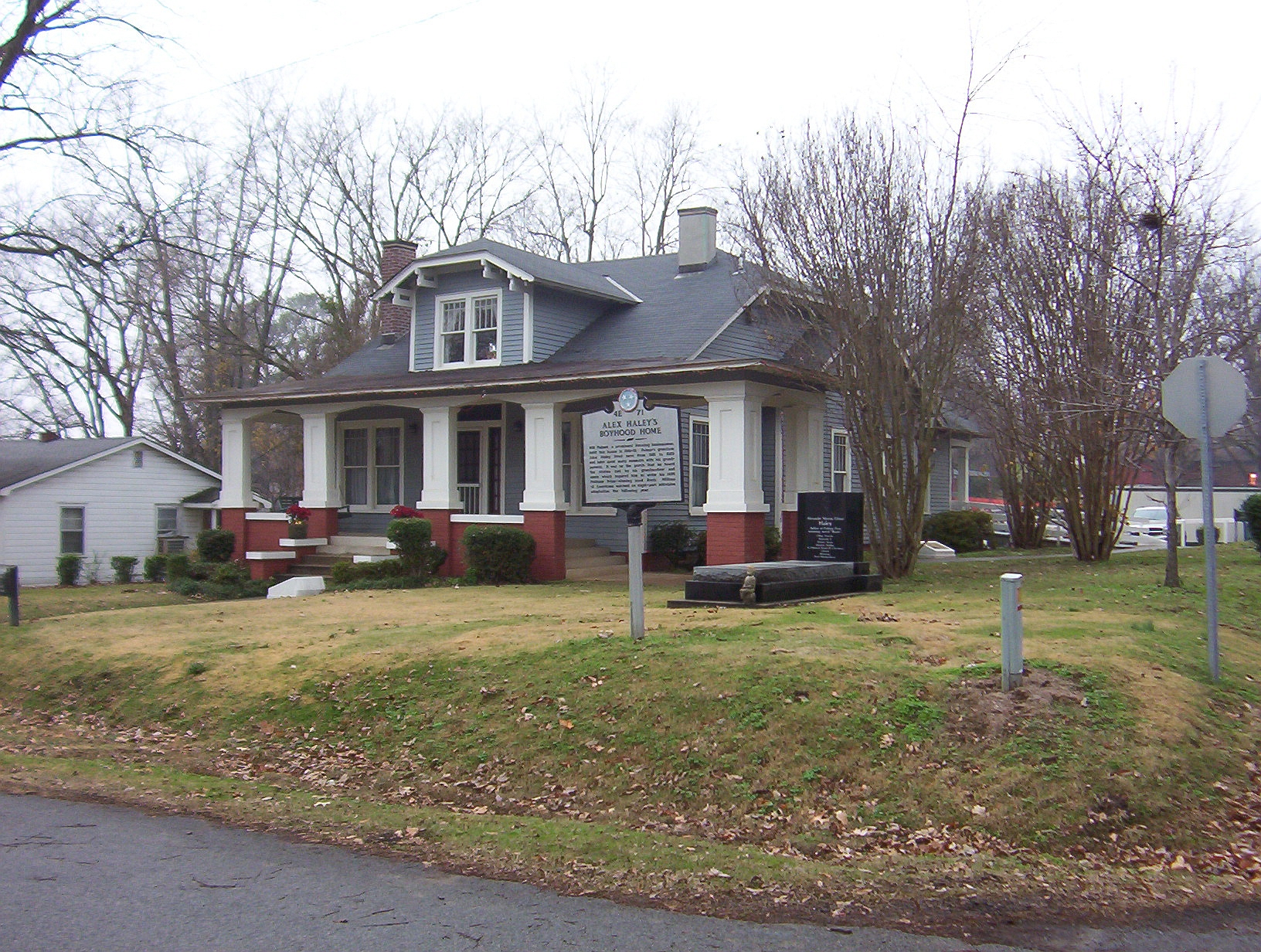
Alex Haley's boyhood home in Henning (2007)

=== City ===
- Ripley (county seat)

=== Town ===
- Gates
- Halls
- Henning

=== Unincorporated communities ===
- Arp
- Cherry
- Durhamville
- Fulton
- Glimp
- Golddust
- Orysa

== Education ==
All parts of the county are in the Lauderdale County School District.

== Notable natives ==
- Sleepy John Estes, blues guitarist born in Ripley
- Alex Haley, author of Roots
- Jim Hickman, professional baseball all-star
- Miles O'Keeffe, television and film actor best known for starring in the 1981 film Tarzan, the Ape Man, and the Ator movies.
- Cary Middlecoff, professional golfer on the PGA Tour known as "Mr. 59" for the lowest score during a PGA event, born in Halls, Tennessee.

== See also ==
- National Register of Historic Places listings in Lauderdale County, Tennessee
