= Hatchie River =

Coordinates: 35°33′5″N 89°53′38″W

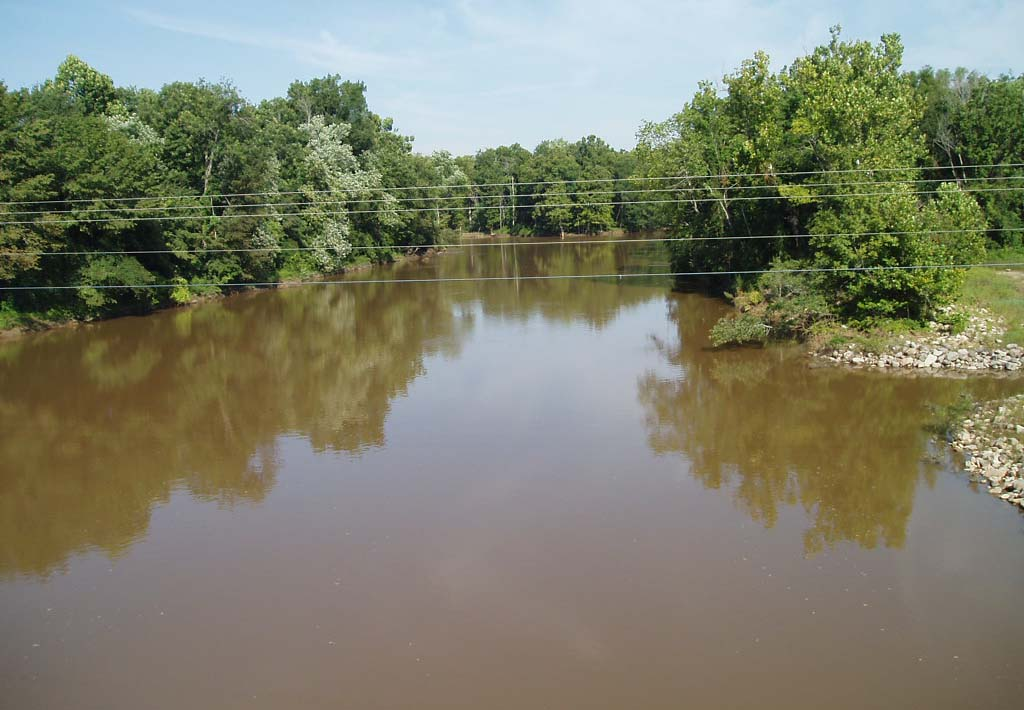
- The Hatchie River at Rialto, Tennessee, on the boundary of Tipton and Lauderdale Counties.

- Location of the mouth in Tennessee Hatchie River (the United States)

Location
- Country: United States
- States: Tennessee and Mississippi

Physical characteristics
- Source
  - location: Union County, Mississippi near Pleasant Ridge, MS
  - elevation: 210 ft (64 m)
- Mouth
  - location: Mississippi River near Randolph, TN
- Length: 238 mi (383 km)

The Hatchie River is a 238-mile-long (383 km) river in northern Mississippi and southwestern Tennessee. It is of considerable geographic, cultural, and historic significance. In large measure, this is because it is the only major river of West Tennessee that has never been impounded, channelized, or otherwise modified by human activity to any major degree, although several of its tributaries have. Its environs are indicative of what much of West Tennessee must have resembled prior to the time of European settlement in early 19th century.

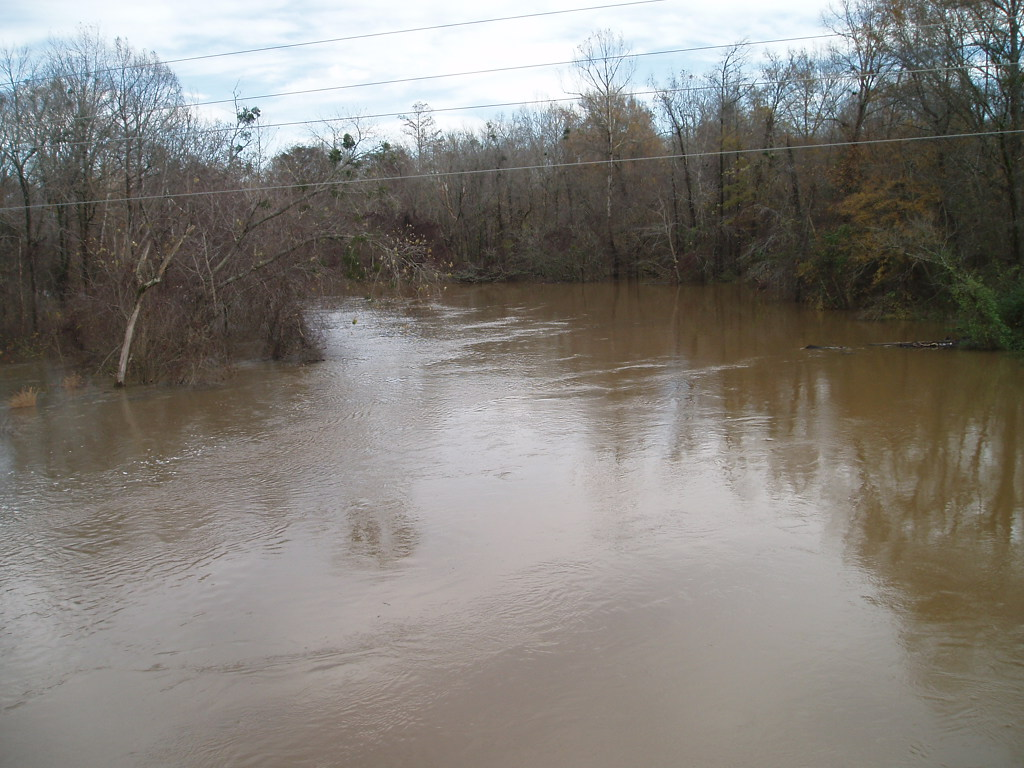
The Hatchie River near Bolivar, Tennessee

The Hatchie rises in the northern part of Union County, Mississippi and travels through Tippah and Alcorn counties before crossing into Hardeman County, Tennessee, near the community of Pocahontas. After a short jog into adjoining McNairy County, Tennessee, the Hatchie flows north, in a serpentine fashion, then turns northwest toward Bolivar. While there is usually a discernible main channel, the Hatchie at this point is largely a zone of wetlands approximately one mile (1.6 km) wide. Supposedly Bolivar was the head of navigation for small, shallow-draught steamboats in the 19th century.

From Bolivar, the Hatchie continues generally northwest, crossing into Haywood County and the southwestern corner of Madison County. It then enters Hatchie National Wildlife Refuge. The rest of the stream course generally trends west. US 51 (Future I-69) crosses the river. There is a "bow" to the north in the final part of the stream course, which forms the line between Tipton County and Lauderdale County. The Hatchie enters the Mississippi River just north of the Hatchie Towhead and just south of the Lower Hatchie National Wildlife Refuge. The Hatchie is designated as a "scenic river" under the Tennessee Wild and Scenic Rivers Act.

The name "Hatchie River" is tautological, as the element "hatchie" means "river" in the Choctaw language.

Variant names of the Hatchie River include Arteguet River and Big Hatchie River.

== See also ==
- List of Mississippi rivers
- List of Tennessee rivers
