= Battle of Fort Pillow =

1864 battle of the American Civil War

- Part of the American Civil War
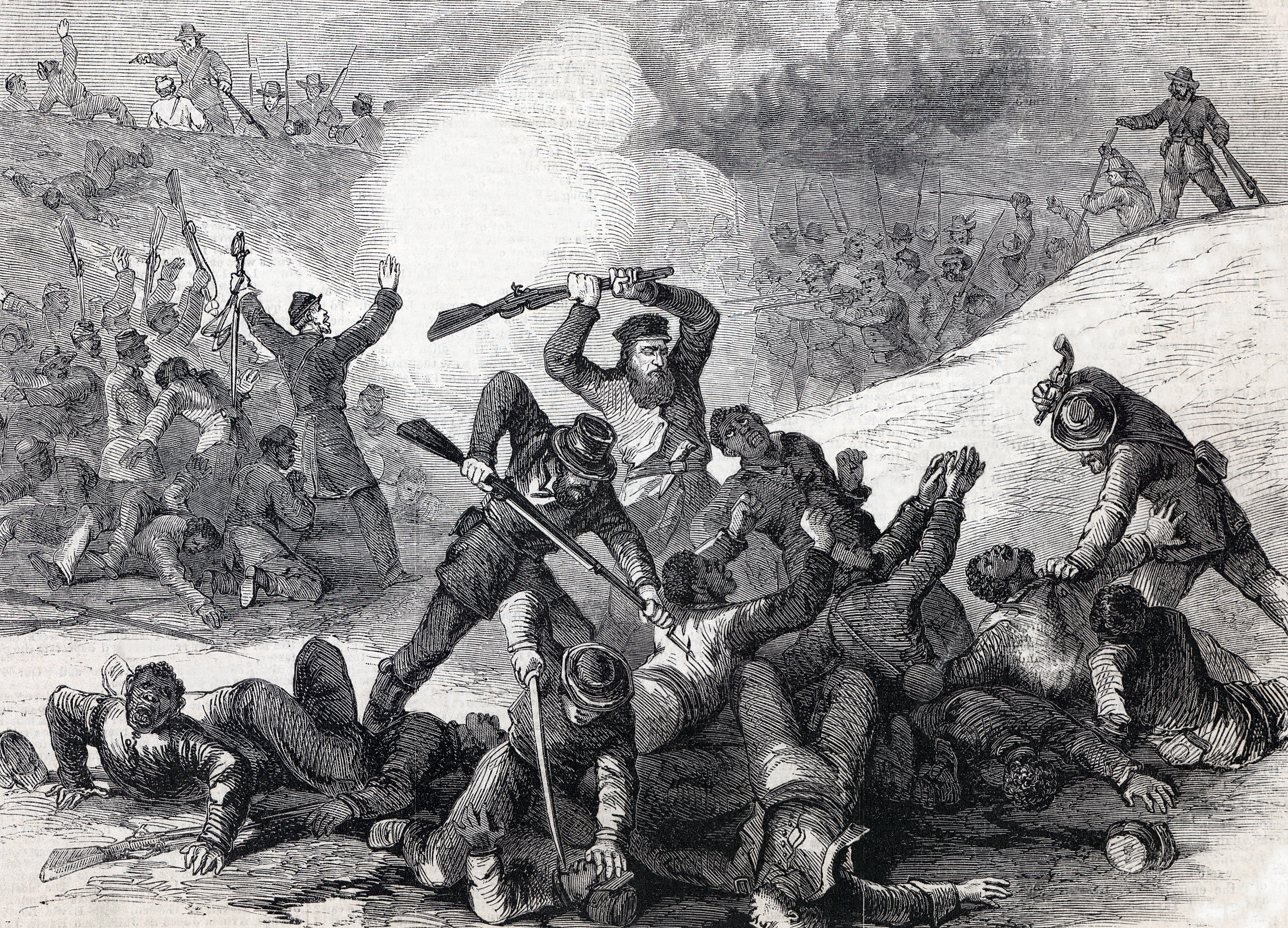
- Caption in Frank Leslie's Illustrated Newspaper (New York), May 7, 1864, "The war in Tennessee: Confederate massacre of black Union troops after the surrender at Fort Pillow, April 12, 1864"
Date	April 12, 1864 (162 years ago)
Location	Lauderdale County, Tennessee 35.6324°N 89.8487°W
Result	Confederate victory

Belligerents
Confederate States	United States (Union)

Commanders and leaders
Nathan Bedford Forrest: James R. Chalmers	(United States) Lionel F. Booth †: William F. Bradford †

Units involved
First Division, Forrest's Cavalry Corps	Fort Pillow garrison: Four companies of the 6th U.S. Artillery (C); Bradford's Battalion, Tennessee Cavalry; One section of Battery D, 2nd U.S. Artillery (C)

Strength
1,500–2,500	600

Casualties and losses
14 killed 86 wounded	221 killed 130 wounded
- Location in Tennessee

The Battle of Fort Pillow, also known as the Fort Pillow Massacre, was fought on April 12, 1864, at Fort Pillow on the Mississippi River in Henning, Tennessee, during the American Civil War. The battle ended with Confederate soldiers commanded by Major General Nathan Bedford Forrest massacring Union soldiers (many of them U.S. Colored Troops) attempting to surrender. Military historian David J. Eicher concluded: "Fort Pillow marked one of the bleakest, saddest events of American military history."

== Background ==
The United States's deployment of the United States Colored Troops combined with Abraham Lincoln's issuing of the Emancipation Proclamation profoundly angered the Confederacy, who called it "uncivilized". In response, the Confederacy in May 1863, passed a law stating that black U.S. soldiers captured while fighting against the Confederacy would be turned over to the state, where the captured would be tried, according to state laws.

Fort Pillow was built in early 1862 by Gideon Johnson Pillow, a Confederate Brigadier General, on the Mississippi River 40 miles (64 km) north of Memphis and was used by both sides during the war. With the fall of New Madrid and Island No. 10 to U.S. Army forces, Confederate troops evacuated Fort Pillow on June 4 to avoid being cut off from the rest of the Confederate army. U.S. Army forces occupied Fort Pillow on June 6 and used it to protect the river approach to Memphis.

The fort stood on a high bluff and was protected by three lines of entrenchments arranged in a semicircle, with a protective parapet 4 ft (1.2 m) thick and 6 to 8 ft (1.8 to 2.4 m) high surrounded by a ditch. (During the battle, this design was a disadvantage to the defenders because they could not fire upon approaching troops without mounting the top of the parapet, which subjected them to enemy fire. Because of the width of the parapet, operators of the six artillery pieces of the fort found it difficult to depress their barrels enough to fire on the attackers once they got close.) A U.S. Navy gunboat, the USS New Era, commanded by Captain James Marshall, was also available for the defense.

On March 16, 1864, Confederate Major General Nathan Bedford Forrest launched a month-long cavalry raid with 7,000 troopers into West Tennessee and Kentucky. Their objectives were to capture U.S. prisoners and supplies and to demolish posts and fortifications from Paducah, Kentucky, south to Memphis. Forrest's Cavalry Corps, which he called "the Cavalry Department of West Tennessee and North Mississippi", consisted of the divisions led by Brig. Gens. James R. Chalmers (brigades of Brig. Gen. Robert V. Richardson and Colonel Robert M. McCulloch) and General Abe Buford (brigades of Cols. Tyree H. Bell and A. P. Thompson).

The first of the two significant engagements in the expedition was the Battle of Paducah on March 25, where Forrest's men did considerable damage to the town and its military supplies. Forrest had tried to bluff U.S. Col. Stephen G. Hicks into surrender, warning, "If I have to storm your works, you may expect no quarter". Hicks rejected the demand, as he knew that the fort could not be easily taken.

Numerous skirmishes occurred throughout the region in late March and early April. Needing supplies, Forrest planned to move on Fort Pillow with about 1,500 to 2,500 men. (He had detached part of his command under Buford to strike Paducah again.) He wrote on April 4, "There is a Federal force of 500 or 600 at Fort Pillow, which I shall attend to in a day or two, as they have horses and supplies which we need."

The U.S. Army garrison at Fort Pillow consisted of about 600 men, divided almost evenly between black and white troops. The black soldiers belonged to the 6th U.S. Regiment Colored Heavy Artillery and a section of the 2nd Colored Light Artillery (previously known as the Memphis Battery Light Artillery (African Descent)), under the overall command of Major Lionel F. Booth, who had been in the fort for only two weeks. Booth had been ordered to move his regiment from Memphis to Fort Pillow on March 28 to augment the cavalry, who had occupied the fort several weeks earlier.

Many of the regiment were formerly enslaved people who understood the personal cost of a loss to the Confederates—at best, an immediate return to slavery rather than being treated as a prisoner of war. They had heard that some Confederates threatened to kill any black U.S. Army troops they encountered. The white soldiers were predominantly recruits from Bradford's Battalion, a U.S. Army unit from west Tennessee commanded by Maj. William F. Bradford.

== Opposing forces ==
=== Union ===
Organization	Regiments and Others
Fort Pillow Garrison; Major Lionel F. Booth (killed); Maj. William Bradford (captured)	6th United States Colored Heavy Artillery; 2nd United States Colored Light Artillery; 13th Tennessee Cavalry; Total strength: 582 troops
Naval support	Gunboat USS New Era, Cpt. James Marshall

=== Confederate ===
Forrest's Cavalry Corps, Major General Nathan Bedford Forrest.
Approximately 1,500 troops.

Division	Brigade	Regiments and Others
Chalmer's Division; MG James Ronald Chalmers
Chalmer's Division; MG James Ronald Chalmers	McCulloch's Brigade Col. Robert McCulloch	5th Mississippi, Lt. Col. Wiley M. Reed (mortally wounded); Duff's Mississippi Battalion, Col. William Lewis Duff; 18th Mississippi Battalion, Col. Alexander H. Chalmers; 2nd Missouri, Col. Robert McCulloch; Willis' Texas Battalion, Cpt. W.R. Sullivan (mortally wounded)
Chalmer's Division; MG James Ronald Chalmers	Bell's Brigade; Col. Tyree H. Bell	2nd Tennessee, Col. Clark R. Barteau; 16th Tennessee, Col. Andrew N. Wilson; 20th Tennessee, Col. Robert M. Russell
Chalmer's Division; MG James Ronald Chalmers	Artillery Battery; Lt. E.S. Walton	Detachment from Hudson's Battery, 4 mountain howitzers

== Battle ==
Forrest arrived at Fort Pillow at 10:00 on April 12. By this time, Chalmers had already surrounded the fort. A stray bullet struck Forrest's horse, felling the general and bruising him. This was the first of three horses he lost that day. He deployed sharpshooters around the higher ground that overlooked the fort, bringing many occupants into their direct line of fire. A sharpshooter's bullet to the chest killed Major Booth, and Bradford assumed command. By 11:00, the Confederates had captured two rows of barracks about 150 yd (140 m) from the southern end of the fort. The U.S. Army soldiers had failed to destroy these buildings before the Confederates occupied them, and they subjected the garrison to a murderous fire.

Rifle and artillery fire continued until 3:30 when Forrest sent a note demanding surrender: "The conduct of the officers and men garrisoning Fort Pillow has been such as to entitle them to being treated as prisoners of war. I demand the unconditional surrender of the entire garrison, promising that you shall be treated as prisoners of war. My men have just received a fresh supply of ammunition, and from their present position can easily assault and capture the fort. Should my demand be refused, I cannot be responsible for the fate of your command."

Bradford replied, concealing his identity as he did not wish the Confederates to realize that Booth had been killed, requesting an hour for consideration. Forrest, who believed that reinforcing troops would soon arrive by a river, replied that he would only allow 20 minutes, and that "If at the expiration of that time the fort is not surrendered, I shall assault it." Bradford refused this opportunity with a final reply: "I will not surrender." Forrest then ordered his bugler to sound the charge.

The Confederate assault was furious. While the sharpshooters maintained their fire into the fort, the first wave entered the ditch and stood while the second wave used their backs as stepping stones. These men then reached down and helped the first wave scramble up a ledge on the embankment. This proceeded flawlessly and with very little firing, except for the sharpshooters and around the flanks. Their fire against the New Era caused the sailors to button up their gun ports and hold their fire. As the sharpshooters were signaled to hold their fire, the men on the ledge went up and over the embankment, firing now for the first time into the massed defenders.

The garrison fought briefly but then broke and ran to the landing at the foot of the bluff, where they had been told that the U.S. Navy gunboat would cover their withdrawal by firing grapeshot and canister rounds. Because its gun ports remained sealed, the gunboat did not fire a single shot. The fleeing soldiers were subjected to fire from the rear and flank. Many were shot down. Others reached the river only to drown or be picked off in the water by sharpshooters on the bluff.

== Massacre ==
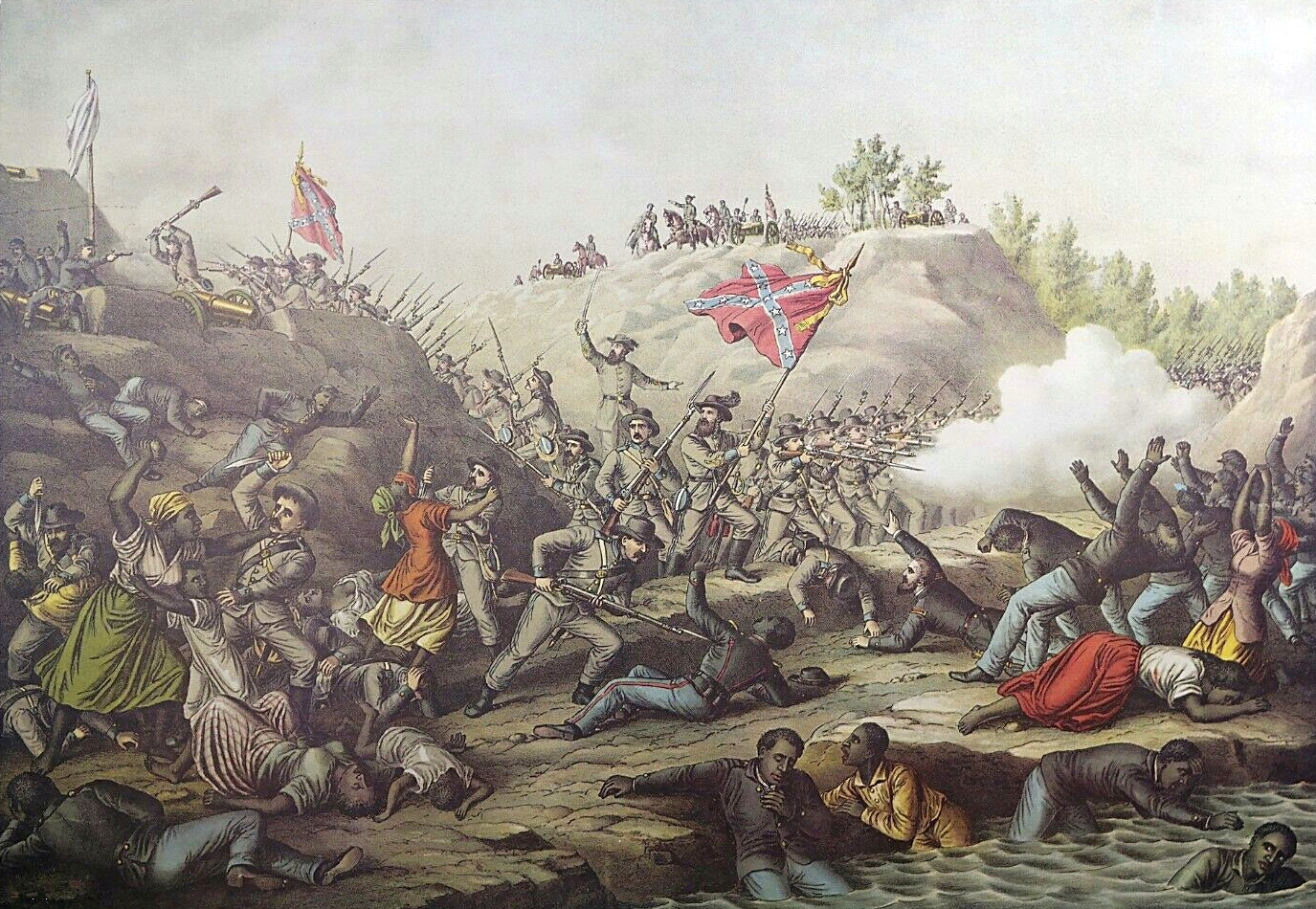
A hand-colored 1892 print titled "The Fort Pillow Massacre" by Chicago-based Kurz and Allison, included in a series of commemorative prints of Civil War battles. It depicts women and children among the victims, though this is not supported by witnesses, who said that women and children had been removed from the fort before the battle.

Although Confederate sources say that Forrest's forces kept firing in self-defense, official U.S. reports emphasize that a deliberate massacre occurred. U.S. Army survivors said that even though all their troops surrendered, Forrest's men massacred some in cold blood. Surviving members of the garrison said that most of their men surrendered and threw down their arms, only to be shot or bayoneted by the attackers, who repeatedly shouted, "No quarter! No quarter!"

It was reported that women and children were killed, but this was disputed by Dr. C. Fitch, who was a surgeon of the Fort Pillow garrison: "Early in the morning all of the women and all of the noncombatants were ordered on to some barges, and were towed by a gunboat up the river to an island before any one was hurt." The testimony of Captain Marshall supports this. He stated that all the women, children, and sick soldiers were removed to an island before the battle started. The strongest evidence that the Confederates did not kill the women and children is that no one reported seeing the bodies of women and children among the slain.

The Joint Committee On the Conduct of the War immediately investigated the incident, which was widely publicized in the U.S. press. Stories appeared April 16 in The New York Times, New York Herald, New-York Tribune, Chicago Tribune, Cincinnati Gazette, and St. Louis Missouri Democrat, based on telegraph reports from Cairo, Illinois, where the steamer Platte Valley, carrying survivors, had called so that they could be taken to a hospital at nearby Mound City, Illinois, and those that had expired on the ship could be buried. In their report, from which the previous quotes were taken, they concluded that the Confederates shot most of the garrison after it had surrendered.

A letter from one of Forrest's sergeants, Achilles V. Clark, writing to his sisters on April 14, reads in part:

Our men were so exasperated by the Yankee's threats of no quarter that they gave but little. The slaughter was awful. Words cannot describe the scene. The poor deluded negros would run up to our men fall on their knees and with uplifted hands scream for mercy but they were ordered to their feet and then shot down. The whitte [sic] men fared but little better. The fort turned out to be a great slaughter pen. Blood, human blood stood about in pools and brains could have been gathered up in any quantity. I with several others tried to stop the butchery and at one time had partially succeeded but Gen. Forrest ordered them shot down like dogs and the carnage continued. Finally our men became sick of blood and the firing ceased.

A 2002 study by Albert Castel concluded that Forrest's troops had killed a large number of the garrison "after they had either ceased resisting or were incapable of resistance". Historian Andrew Ward in 2005 concluded that an atrocity in the modern sense occurred at Fort Pillow, but that the event was not premeditated nor officially sanctioned by Confederate commanders.

Recent histories concur that a massacre occurred. Historian Richard Fuchs, the author of An Unerring Fire, concludes, "The affair at Fort Pillow was simply an orgy of death, a mass lynching to satisfy the basest of conduct—intentional murder—for the vilest of reasons—racism and personal enmity." Ward states, "Whether the massacre was premeditated or spontaneous does not address the more fundamental question of whether a massacre took place ... it certainly did, in every dictionary sense of the word." John Cimprich states, "The new paradigm in social attitudes and the fuller use of available evidence has favored a massacre interpretation. ... Debate over the memory of this incident formed a part of sectional and racial conflicts for many years after the war, but the reinterpretation of the event during the last thirty years offers some hope that society can move beyond past intolerance."

Lieutenant Daniel Van Horn of the 6th U.S. Heavy Artillery (Colored) stated in his official report, "There never was a surrender of the fort, both officers and men declaring they never would surrender or ask for quarter." Another unit officer, however, and the only surviving officers of Bradford's Battalion, attested to the characterization that unarmed soldiers were killed in the act of surrendering.

Forrest's men insisted that the U.S. soldiers, although fleeing, kept their weapons and frequently turned to shoot, forcing the Confederates to keep firing in self-defense. Their claim is consistent with the discovery of numerous U.S. Army rifles on the bluffs near the river. The U.S. flag was still flying over the fort, which indicated that the force had not formally surrendered. A contemporary newspaper account from Jackson, Tennessee, states that "General Forrest begged them to surrender", but "not the first sign of surrender was ever given". Similar accounts were reported in both Southern and Northern newspapers at the time.

Historian Allan Nevins wrote that although the interpretation of the facts had "provoked some disputation":

Northerners, however, saw only one side. They read headlines announcing "Attack on Fort Pillow—Indiscriminate Slaughter of the Prisoners—Shocking Scenes of Savagery"; dispatches from Sherman's army declaring "there is a general gritting of teeth here"; reports from the Missouri Democrat detailing the "fiendishness" of rebel behavior; and editorials like that in the Chicago Tribune condemning the "murder" and "butchery".

The New York Times reported on April 24:

The blacks and their officers were shot down, bayoneted and put to the sword in cold blood. ... Out of four hundred negro soldiers only about twenty survive! At least three hundred of them were destroyed after the surrender! This is the statement of the rebel General Chalmers himself to our informant.

Forrest's dispatch stated:

A demand was made for the surrender, which was refused. The victory was complete, and the loss of the enemy will never be known from the fact that large numbers ran into the river and were shot and drowned. The force was composed of about 500 negroes and 200 white soldiers (Tennessee Tories). The river was dyed with the blood of the slaughtered for 200 yards. There was in the fort a large number of citizens who had fled there to escape the conscript law. Most of these ran into the river and were drowned. The approximate loss was upward of 500 killed, but few of the officers escaping. It is hoped that these facts will demonstrate to the Northern people that negro soldiers cannot cope with Southerners.

General Ulysses S. Grant quoted Forrest's dispatch in his Personal Memoirs and commented: "Subsequently, Forrest made a report in which he left out the part which shocks humanity to read."

John Fisher, in his book They Rode with Forrest and Wheeler, wrote, "Grant refers here to two reports from Forrest to his superior officer, Leonidas Polk: (1) a hasty, exuberant report dated April 15, 1864, dashed off three days after the attack on Fort Pillow, describing the success of Forrest's recent operations in West Tennessee, and (2) a well-defined, detailed, and comprehensive report of the action at Fort Pillow only dated April 26."

At the time of the massacre, General Grant was no longer in Tennessee, having transferred to the east to command all U.S. Army troops. Major General William Tecumseh Sherman, Commander of the Military Division of the Mississippi, which included Tennessee, wrote:

The massacre at Fort Pillow occurred April 12, 1864, and has been the subject of congressional inquiry. No doubt Forrest's men acted like a set of barbarians, shooting down the helpless negro garrison after the fort was in their possession; but I am told that Forrest personally disclaims any active participation in the assault, and that he stopped the firing as soon as he could. I also take it for granted that Forrest did not lead the assault in person, and consequently that he was to the rear, out of sight if not of hearing at the time, and I was told by hundreds of our men, who were at various times prisoners in Forrest's possession, that he was usually very kind to them. He had a desperate set of fellows under him, and at that very time there is no doubt the feeling of the Southern people was fearfully savage on this very point of our making soldiers out of their late slaves, and Forrest may have shared the feeling.

== Military aftermath ==
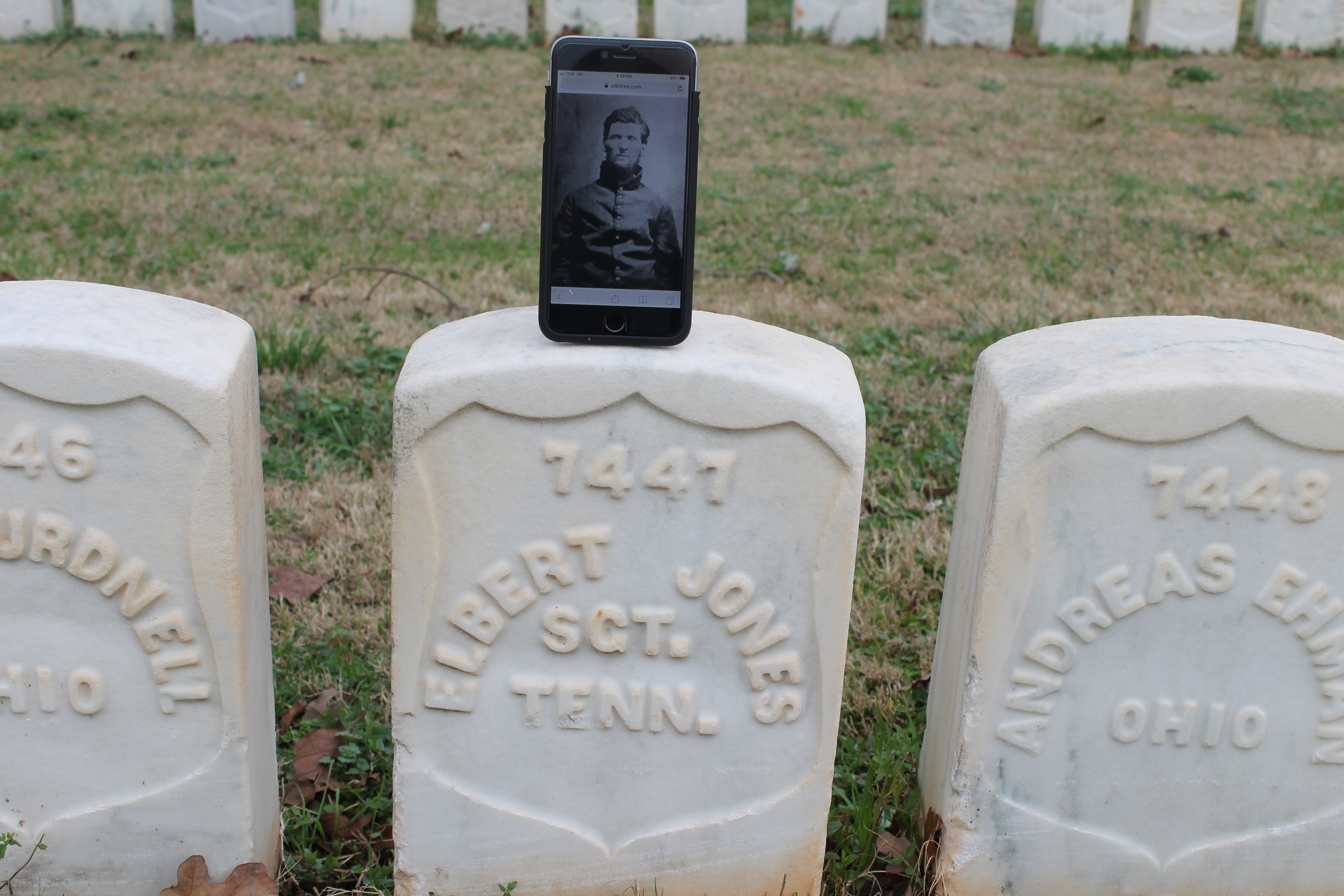
Elbert Jones - Andersonville National Cemetery

Casualty figures vary according to the source. In 1908, Dyer gave the following statistics of U.S. Army casualties: 350 killed and mortally wounded, 60 wounded, 164 captured and missing—574 in the aggregate.

Confederate casualties were comparatively low (14 killed and 86 wounded), and U.S. casualties were high. Of the 585 to 605 U.S. men present, 277 to 297 were reported as dead. Jordan, in the mid-20th century, suggested that U.S. deaths were exaggerated. Historians agree that defenders' casualties varied considerably according to race. Only 58 (around 20%) black soldiers were taken prisoner, whereas 168 (about 60%) white soldiers were taken prisoner. Not all of the prisoners who were shot were black; Major Bradford was apparently among those shot after surrendering.

The Confederates evacuated Fort Pillow that evening and gained little from the battle except causing a temporary disruption to U.S. Army operations. U.S. forces used the "Fort Pillow massacre" as a rallying cry in the following months. For many, it strengthened their resolve to see the war to its conclusion.

On April 17, 1864, in the aftermath of Fort Pillow, General Grant ordered General Benjamin F. Butler, who was negotiating prisoner exchanges with the Confederacy, to demand that black soldiers be treated identically to whites in the exchange and treatment of prisoners. He directed that a failure to do so would "be regarded as a refusal on their part to agree to the further exchange of prisoners, and [would] be so treated by us."

This demand was refused; Confederate Secretary of War James Seddon in June 1864 wrote:

I doubt, however, whether the exchange of negroes at all for our soldiers would be tolerated. As to the white officers serving with negro troops, we ought never to be inconvenienced with such prisoners.

The United States already had established a policy to discourage killing and enslaving prisoners of war. On July 30, 1863, before the massacre, President Abraham Lincoln wrote his Order of Retaliation:

It is therefore ordered that for every soldier of the United States killed in violation of the laws of war, a rebel soldier shall be executed; and for every one enslaved by the enemy or sold into slavery[,] a rebel soldier shall be placed at hard labor on the public works, and continued at such labor until the other shall be released and receive the treatment due to a prisoner of war.

This policy did not lead to any action, but the threat of action led the Confederate army tacitly to treat black U.S. Army soldiers as legitimate soldiers, rather than formerly enslaved people, for the remainder of the war. Nevertheless, the same merciless behavior was exhibited by Southern troops after the Battle of the Crater in July 1864, where surrendering black U.S. soldiers were shot rather than taken prisoner.

== Political aftermath ==
On May 3, 1864, Lincoln asked his cabinet for opinions on how the United States should respond to the massacre. Secretary of the Treasury Salmon P. Chase recommended for Lincoln to enforce his Order of Retaliation of July 30, 1863. Secretary of the Navy Gideon Welles wanted to wait for the congressional committee to obtain more information. Welles expressed concerns in his diary: "There must be something in these terrible reports, but I distrust Congressional committees. They exaggerate." Secretary of War Edwin M. Stanton and Attorney General Edward Bates wanted to retaliate. Secretary of the Interior John P. Usher wrote that it was "inexpedient to take any extreme action" and wanted the officers of Forrest's command to be held responsible. Postmaster General Montgomery Blair wanted the "actual offenders" given the "most summary punishment when captured". Blair cited page 445 of the book International Law; or, Rules Regulating the Intercourse of States in Peace and War, written by Henry W. Halleck (the U.S. Chief of Staff), as justification for retaliation. Secretary of State William H. Seward wanted the commanding general of the U.S. Army to confront the commanding general of the Confederate army about the allegations.

Welles wrote of the cabinet meeting on May 6:

Stanton fell in with my suggestion, so far as to propose that, should Forrest, or Chalmers, or any officer conspicuous in this butchery be captured, he should be turned over for trial for the murders at Fort Pillow. I sat beside Chase and mentioned to him some of the advantages of this course, and he said it made a favorable impression. I urged him to say so, for it appeared to me that the President and Seward did not appreciate it.

Lincoln began to respond to Stanton but took no subsequent action because he was "distracted" by other issues. Ultimately, Lincoln chose no action on the issue, as he sadly noted to Frederick Douglass: "if once begun, there was no telling where [retaliation] would end." Lincoln further stated that only victory would genuinely bring justice, as the perpetrators "can only be effectually reached by a successful prosecution of the war".

== Legacy ==
Fort Pillow, preserved as the Fort Pillow State Historic Park, was designated a National Historic Landmark in 1974.

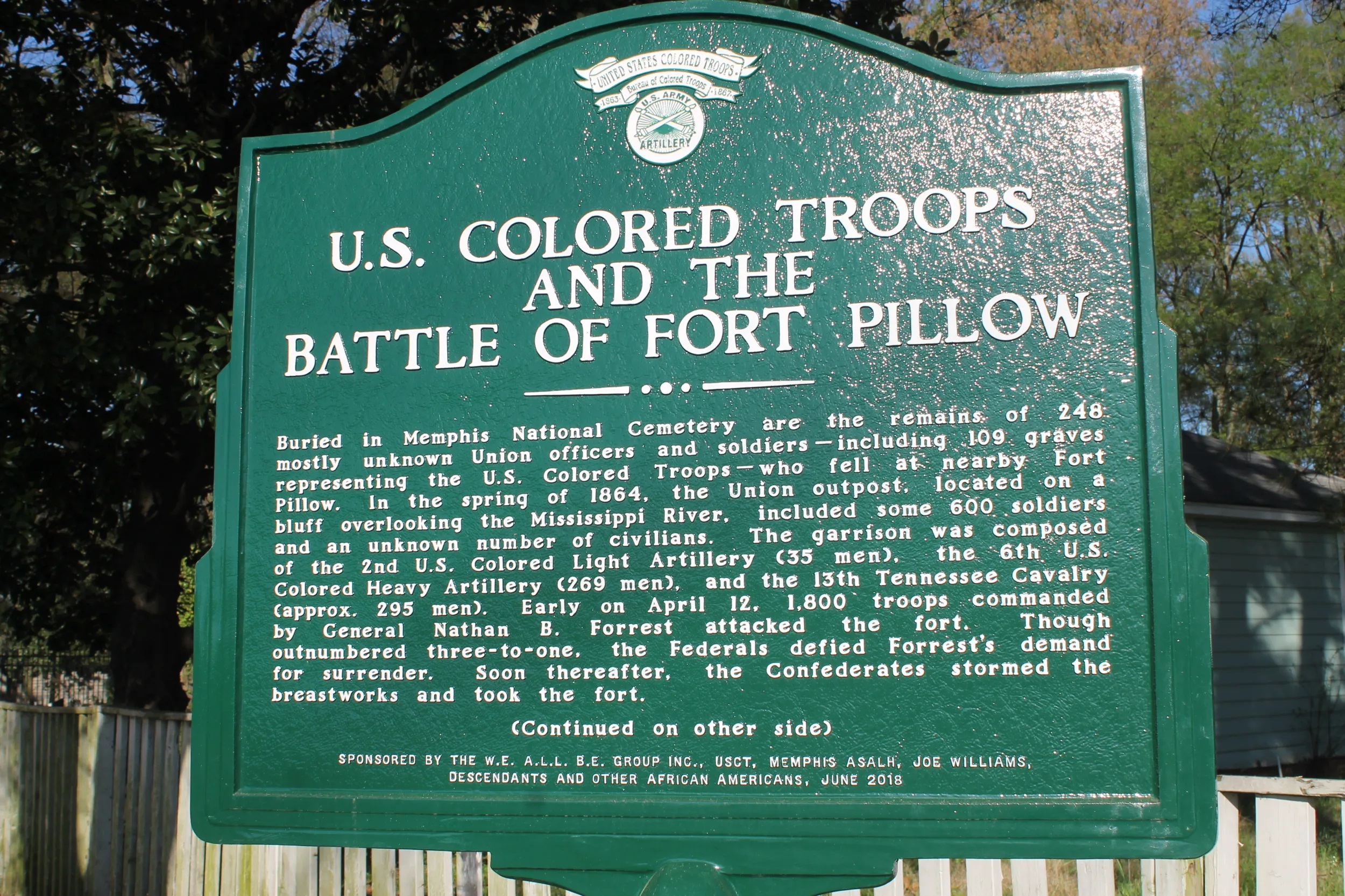
Memphis National Cemetery

The remains of the killed were moved to Memphis National Cemetery in 1867. One hundred nine of the graves have been identified. As the signage at the Fort Pillow site makes little reference to the black soldiers killed, a wreath-laying ceremony, with color guard and a 21-gun salute, was held on April 12, 2017, at the cemetery to commemorate them.

James Lockett compared the Confederacy's policy toward colored U.S. Army troops—"no quarter"—with the lynching and other violence against blacks after the war. In Southern minds, according to this writer, just as formerly enslaved people could not be voters or office-holders, they could not be soldiers either, and thus were not treated, at Fort Pillow and elsewhere, as surrendering soldiers.

== In popular culture ==
Numerous novelists have included the Fort Pillow story, including Frank Yerby's The Foxes of Harrow, James Sherburne's The Way to Fort Pillow; Allen Ballard, Where I'm Bound; Jesse Hill Ford, The Raider; and Charles Gordon Yeager, Fightin' with Forest.

- At the start of chapter 29 of his Life on the Mississippi (1883), Mark Twain mentions passing by "... what was once the formidable Fort Pillow, memorable because of the massacre perpetrated there during the war ... we must bunch Anglo-Saxon history together to find the fellow to the Fort Pillow tragedy."
- African-American novelist Frank Yerby provided a brief narration of the massacre in his 1946 novel, The Foxes of Harrow (chapter XXXVI).
- Perry Lentz's novel The Falling Hills (1967, paperback 1994) centers on the Fort Pillow Massacre as its main plot element, with the book's two protagonists as members of the opposing sides in the battle.
- The film Last Stand at Saber River (1997), based on the Elmore Leonard novel of the same name, featured a character (played by Tom Selleck) who was a Confederate soldier at the Fort Pillow massacre. The character returns to his home in the U.S. Southwest, where he describes the events as murder.
- In 1999, Stan Armstrong produced the documentary The Forgotten Battle of Fort Pillow. It explores the details of the battle and Confederate General Bedford G. Forrest, who planned and led the attack.
- In the 2004 mockumentary film C.S.A.: The Confederate States of America, an analogous alternate history massacre takes place somewhere in the North, following the Confederacy winning the Civil War.
- Harry Turtledove published Fort Pillow (2006), a historical novel about the battle and the massacre. His earlier novel, the alternate history The Guns of the South (1992), also makes a brief reference to the Fort Pillow massacre, while his fantasy trilogy War Between the Provinces (1999–2001) references "Fort Cushion" as the analog.
- In part 4 of the 2016 television miniseries Roots, the character Chicken George fights at the Battle of Fort Pillow but manages to escape.
- In Changó, el gran putas by Colombian doctor, anthropologist, and writer Manuel Zapata Olivella, the battle of Fort Pillow is described in the first person by one of its combatants.

== See also ==
- List of massacres in the United States
- Centralia Massacre (Missouri), a similar event five months later
