= West Tennessee State Penitentiary =

Prison in Tennessee, United States

Coordinates: 35°40′13″N 89°44′48″W

- Interactive map of West Tennessee State Penitentiary
- Location: 480 Green Chapel Road Henning, Tennessee
- Status: Open
- Security class: Minimum or Maximum
- Capacity: 1,082
- Opened: 1990
- Managed by: Tennessee Department of Correction
- Director: Johnny Fitz

West Tennessee State Penitentiary (WTSP) is a Tennessee Department of Correction prison located in unincorporated Lauderdale County, Tennessee, near Henning. Site #1 of WTSP formerly housed the Cold Creek Correctional Facility.

The West Tennessee High Security Facility (WTHSF) became operational in 1990. In 1999 the Cold Creek Correctional Facility (CCCF) closed. CCCF was replaced by a medium security complex built next to WTHSF. The two complexes and the CCCF minimum security annex were operationally combined and became the WTSP.

== Notable inmates ==
Notable prisoners held at the facility include:

- Letalvis Cobbins – convicted of the murders of Channon Christian and Christopher Newsom
- Megan Boswell – Toddler killer Megan Boswell has been transferred to a prison in West Tennessee, according to the Tennessee Department of Correction. Boswell was convicted on February 13, 2025, of numerous crimes, including the murder of her daughter, 1-year-old Evelyn Boswell.
- Shanterrica Madden – Murdered roommate and former Middle Tennessee State University basketball player Tina Stewart in March 2011, during an argument that eventually turned physical, resulting in Stewart's death.
- Alissa McCommon – Former elementary school teacher convicted of the statutory rape of a 12-year-old male student. She is a suspected serial rapist, as police believe she may have raped/abused an additional twenty one underage boys.
- Melissa Blair – Serial rapist convicted of the human trafficking and statutory rapes of 18 underage boys (age range between 14 and 17). Currently serving a 22-year prison sentence.
