= Fort Pillow State Historic Park =

Civil war battlefield in Tennessee, United States

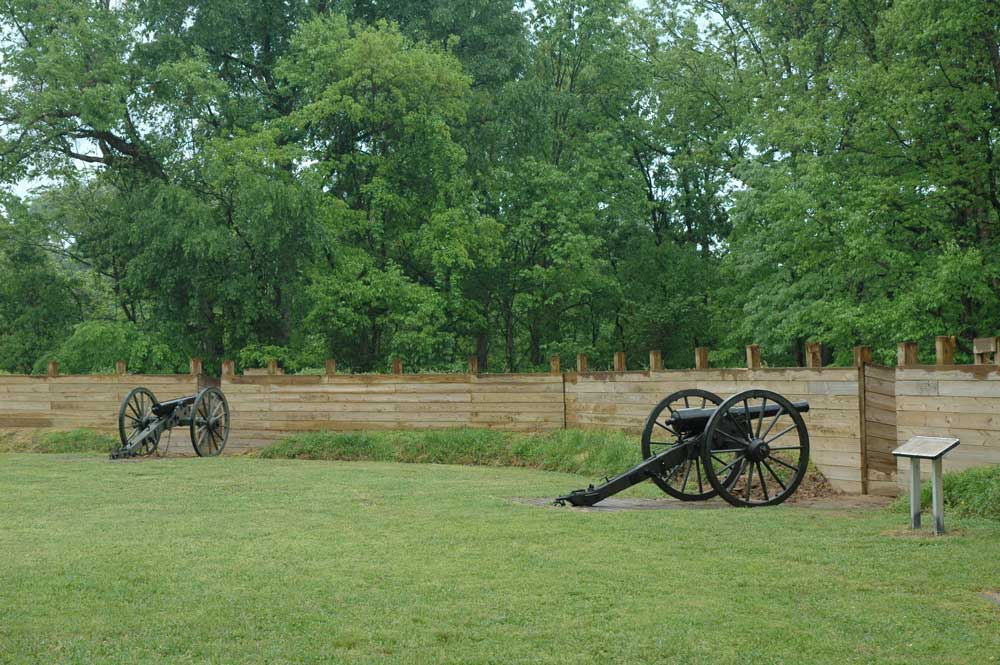
- Cannons at Fort Pillow in 2006

- Location within Tennessee
- Type: Tennessee State Park
- Location: Lauderdale County
- Nearest town: Henning, Tennessee
- Coordinates: 35°38′10″N 89°50′32″W
- Area: 1,642 acres (6.64 km^{2})
- Created: 1971
- Open: Year round
- Website: tnstateparks.com/parks/fort-pillow
- Fort Pillow
- U.S. National Register of Historic Places
- U.S. National Historic Landmark
- Built: June 6, 1861
- NRHP reference No.: 73001806

Significant dates
- Added to NRHP: April 11, 1973
- Designated NHL: May 30, 1974

Fort Pillow State Historic Park is a state park in western Tennessee that preserves the American Civil War site of the Battle of Fort Pillow. The 1,642 acre (6.6 km²) Fort Pillow, located in Lauderdale County on the Chickasaw Bluffs overlooking the Mississippi River, is rich in both historic and archaeological significance. In 1861, the Confederate army built extensive fortifications and named the site for General Gideon Johnson Pillow of Maury County. It was attacked and held by the Union Army for most of the American Civil War period except immediately after the Battle of Fort Pillow, when it was retaken by the Confederate Army. The battle ended with a massacre of African-American Union troops and their white officers attempting to surrender, by soldiers under the command of Confederate Major General Nathan Bedford Forrest.

== Description and administrative history ==
Remains of historic Fort Pillow's earthworks are preserved. The park has a museum and interpretive sites. It offers recreational activities; including camping, picnicking, and fishing. In 1973, the earthworks were added to the National Register of Historic Places. it was designated as a National Historic Landmark in 1974.

== American Civil War ==
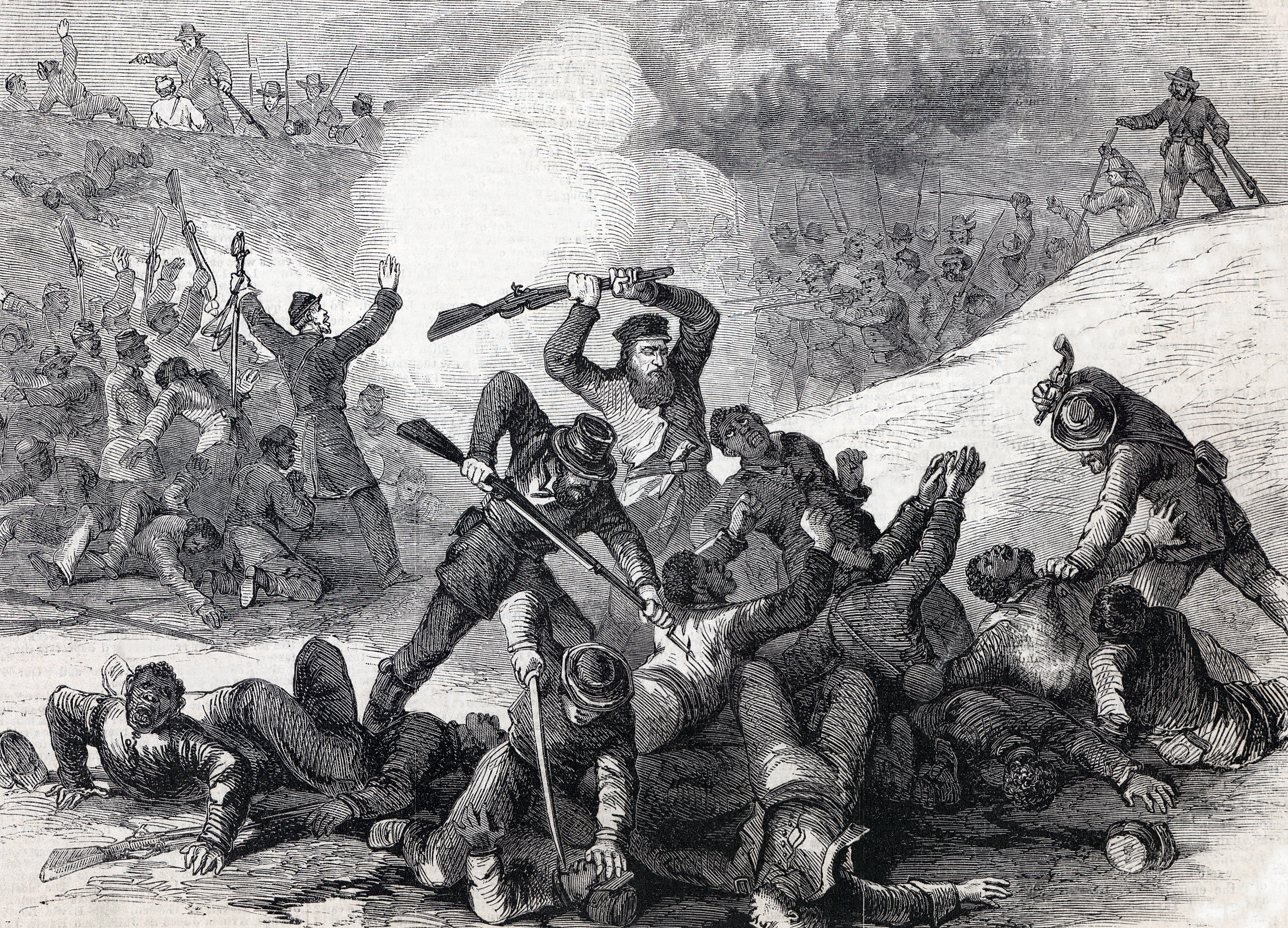
Caption in Frank Leslie's Illustrated Newspaper, May 7, 1864, "The war in Tennessee: Confederate massacre of black Union troops after the surrender at Fort Pillow, April 12, 1864"

On June 4, 1862, Confederate troops evacuated Fort Pillow, enabling Union troops to take Memphis, Tennessee. Because of its strategic location controlling traffic on the Mississippi River, the fort was occupied by the Union Army, which controlled it during most of the war. An exception to Union control of the fort took place for less than one day immediately after the Confederate victory in the Battle of Fort Pillow on April 12, 1864. The battle resulted in the massacre of 229 of the 262 U.S. Colored Troops engaged in the battle. The white Union soldiers numbered 285. An examination of regimental records showed that "less than 36 percent of the men from white units died in battle or of wounds, while the death toll for black units was 66 percent."

A Confederate wrote in a letter home that "Forrest ordered them [negroes] shot down like dogs, and the carnage continued." In addition to regimental records, contemporary accounts by troops on both sides, as well as journalists, describe it as appalling slaughter. Within about three weeks, as political controversy grew, Confederates began to dispute accounts of a massacre. Subsequent reports after the battle from Union officers to the Department of War countered much that was reported in the popular press and some of the testimony given before Congress. This slaughter by the Confederate troops under Gen. Nathan Bedford Forrest has been classified by historians as a massacre.

"Remember Fort Pillow!" became a battle cry among black Union soldiers for the remainder of the Civil War. While the Union casualty count for the battle does not indicate that the Confederate forces took many prisoners, Confederate records show about 200 prisoners were shipped south.

In 1866, the Union Army created a cemetery for both Confederate and Union soldiers south of the battle site. In 1867, they moved about 250 bodies of Confederate and Union soldiers from that cemetery to the Memphis National Cemetery.

== See also ==
- Battle of Plum Point Bend
- Golddust, Tennessee
- List of National Historic Landmarks in Tennessee
- National Register of Historic Places listings in Lauderdale County, Tennessee
