= Henning, Tennessee =

- Town
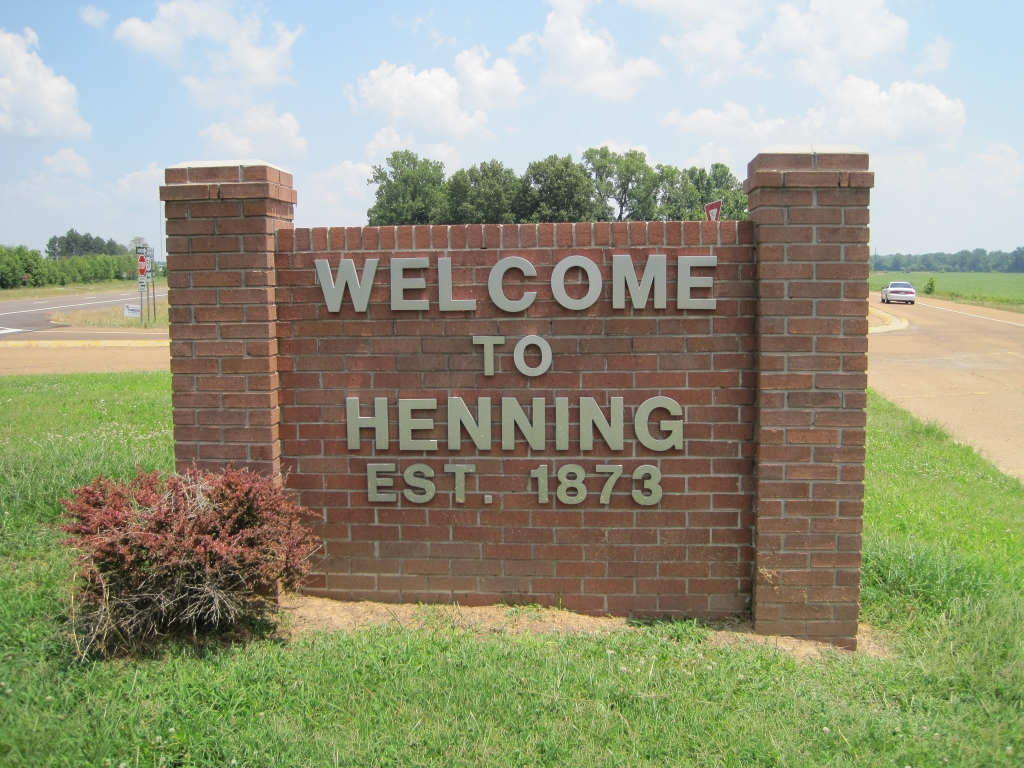

- Location of Henning in Lauderdale County, Tennessee.
- Coordinates: 35°40′25″N 89°34′39″W
- Country: United States
- State: Tennessee
- County: Lauderdale

Area
  - Total: 2.47 sq mi (6.40 km^{2})
  - Land: 2.47 sq mi (6.39 km^{2})
  - Water: 0.0039 sq mi (0.01 km^{2})
- Elevation: 292 ft (89 m)

Population (2020)
  - Total: 871
  - Density: 353.0/sq mi (136.31/km^{2})
- Time zone: UTC-6 (Central (CST))
  - Summer (DST): UTC-5 (CDT)
- ZIP code: 38041
- Area code: 731
- FIPS code: 47-33360
- GNIS feature ID: 1287426
- Website: https://www.townofhenningtn.org/

Henning is a town in Lauderdale County, Tennessee, United States. The population was 871 at the 2020 census.

== History ==
Founded in the late 1800s, the town is named after prominent businessman and railway official William H. Henning. The infamous Battle of Fort Pillow, a Civil War victory for the Confederates, took place near Henning. Here, nearly 300 black troops serving in the Union Army were massacred after surrendering by Confederates under the command of General Nathan Bedford Forrest. The Confederate refusal to treat these troops as traditional prisoners of war infuriated the North, and led to the Union’s refusal to participate in prisoner exchanges. Union survivors’ accounts, later supported by a federal investigation, concluded that African-American troops were massacred by Forrest’s men after surrendering.

In 1900, a local black man, Anderson Gause, was lynched by a mob.

== Geography ==
Henning is located at 35°40′25″N 89°34′39″W (35.673563, -89.577366).

According to the United States Census Bureau, the town has a total area of 1.3 square miles (3.4 km^{2}), all land.

Henning is situated on the southeastern edge of the New Madrid Seismic Zone, an area with a high earthquake risk.

== Demographics ==
Historical population
Census	Pop.	Note	%±
1880	148		—
1890	420		183.8%
1910	582		—
1920	495		−14.9%
1930	639		29.1%
1940	415		−35.1%
1950	493		18.8%
1960	466		−5.5%
1970	605		29.8%
1980	638		5.5%
1990	802		25.7%
2000	970		20.9%
2010	945		−2.6%
2020	871		−7.8%

=== Racial and ethnic composition ===
Henning town, Tennessee – Racial and ethnic composition Note: the US Census treats Hispanic/Latino as an ethnic category. This table excludes Latinos from the racial categories and assigns them to a separate category. Hispanics/Latinos may be of any race.
Race / Ethnicity (NH = Non-Hispanic)	Pop 2000	Pop 2010	Pop 2020	% 2000	% 2010	% 2020
White alone (NH)	214	188	153	22.06%	19.89%	17.57%
Black or African American alone (NH)	725	711	621	74.74%	75.24%	71.30%
Native American or Alaska Native alone (NH)	13	25	39	1.34%	2.65%	4.48%
Asian alone (NH)	0	1	0	0.00%	0.11%	0.00%
Native Hawaiian or Pacific Islander alone (NH)	0	0	0	0.00%	0.00%	0.00%
Other race alone (NH)	0	1	3	0.00%	0.11%	0.34%
Mixed race or Multiracial (NH)	14	10	34	1.44%	1.06%	3.90%
Hispanic or Latino (any race)	4	9	21	0.41%	0.95%	2.41%
Total	970	945	871	100.00%	100.00%	100.00%

=== 2020 census ===
As of the 2020 United States census, there were 871 people, 491 households, and 315 families residing in the town.

=== 2000 census ===
As of the census of 2000, there were 970 people, 362 households, and 238 families residing in the town. The population density was 752.3 inhabitants per square mile (290.5/km^{2}). There were 406 housing units at an average density of 314.9 per square mile (121.6/km^{2}). The racial makeup of the town was 22.37% White, 74.85% African American, 1.34% Native American, and 1.44% from two or more races. Hispanic or Latino of any race were 0.41% of the population.

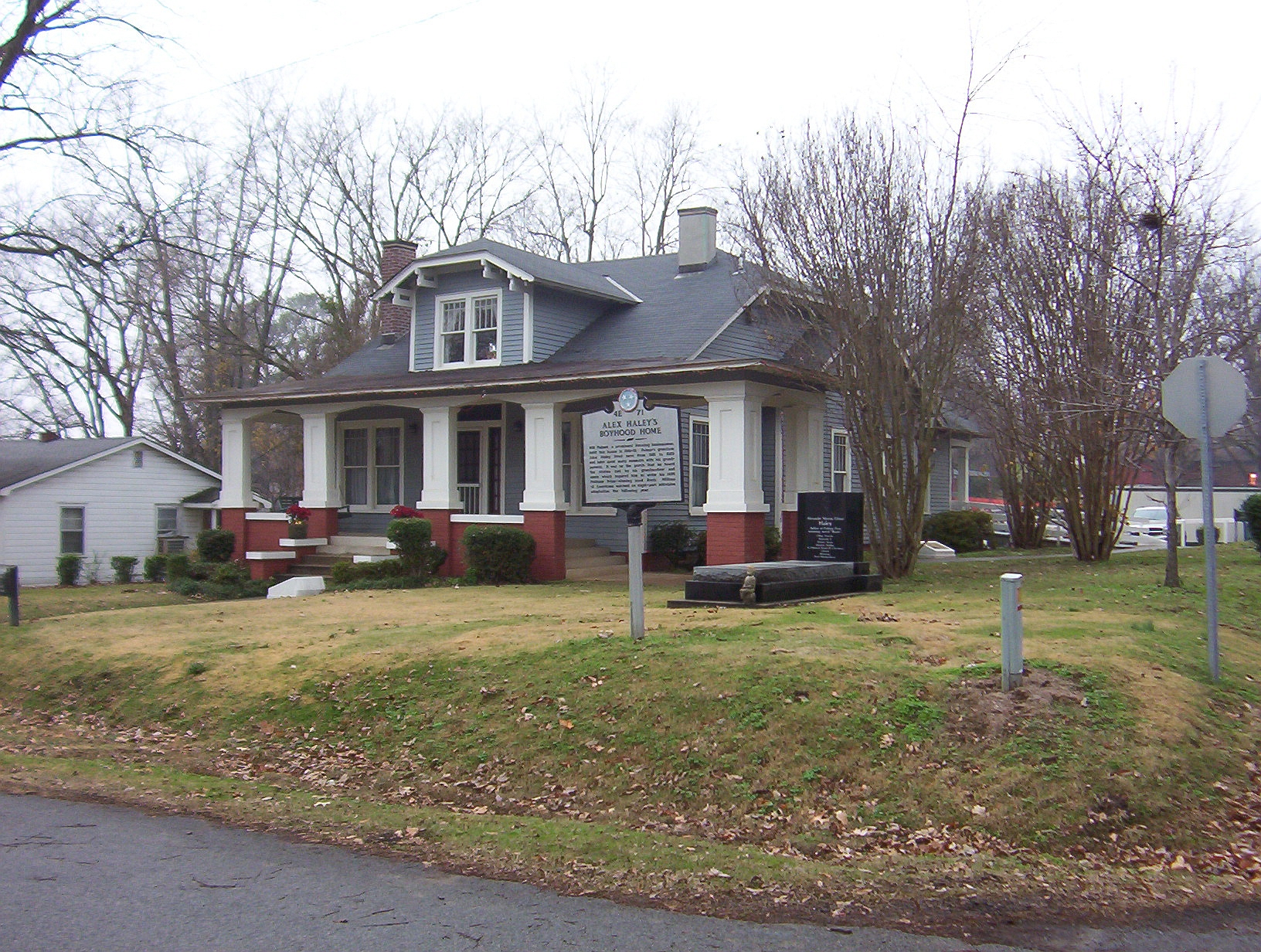
Alex Haley's boyhood home and his grave beside the home (2007)

There were 362 households, out of which 32.6% had children under the age of 18 living with them, 35.4% were married couples living together, 26.0% had a female householder with no husband present, and 34.0% were non-families. 30.4% of all households were made up of individuals, and 13.0% had someone living alone who was 65 years of age or older. The average household size was 2.68 and the average family size was 3.37.

In the town, the population was spread out, with 32.8% under the age of 18, 10.6% from 18 to 24, 24.1% from 25 to 44, 19.2% from 45 to 64, and 13.3% who were 65 years of age or older. The median age was 31 years. For every 100 females, there were 90.9 males. For every 100 females age 18 and over, there were 76.7 males.

The median income for a household in the town was $20,438, and the median income for a family was $19,776. Males had a median income of $26,500 versus $19,583 for females. The per capita income for the town was $8,413, which is the lowest in the state. About 30.9% of families and 30.0% of the population were below the poverty line, including 31.9% of those under age 18 and 30.2% of those age 65 or over.

== Government and infrastructure ==
The United States Postal Service operates the Henning Post Office.

The Tennessee Department of Corrections operates the West Tennessee State Penitentiary in unincorporated Lauderdale County, near Henning. Previously the Cold Creek Correctional Facility was located in the area.

Henning is home to a community of Mississippi Band of Choctaw Indians. The tribe placed 79 acres of local land into federal trust in 2012, making it the only Native American Indian tribe that owns land in Tennessee.

== Education ==
Henning public schools are part of Lauderdale County School District. The school district has one primary school, two elementary schools, one middle school, one junior high school and two high schools.

Shawn Kimble is the superintendent of schools.

== Notable people ==
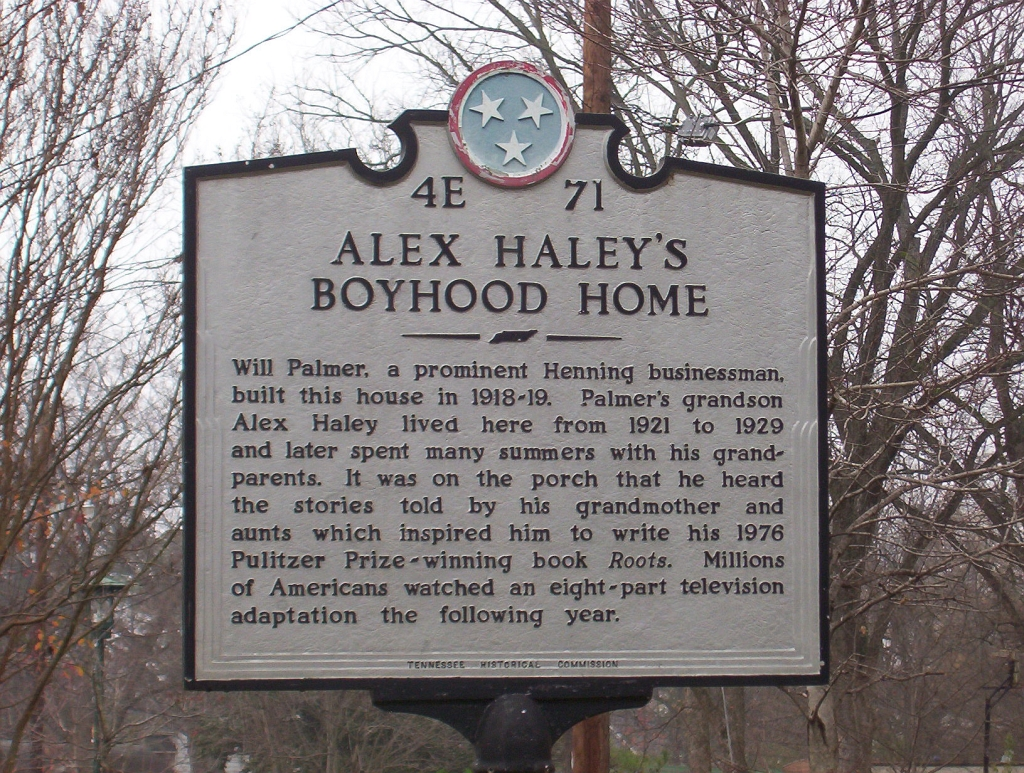
Historical marker in front of Alex Haley's boyhood home (2007)

- John Henry Barbee, blues guitarist known for his connection to Chicago's blues scene
- Ramon Foster, offensive lineman for Pittsburgh Steelers
- Erle P. Halliburton, the founder of Halliburton Company (the world's second largest oil field service company), was born in Henning.
- Alex Haley, author, best known for Roots, winner of Pulitzer Prize in 1976 and acclaimed television miniseries; Henning was his boyhood home
- Jim Hickman, Major League Baseball outfielder, 1962–74
- Noah Lewis, jug band performer
