= Tennessee State Route 19 =

State highway in Tennessee, United States

State Route 19
- Tina Turner Highway
- SR 19; primary in red, secondary in blue

Route information
- Maintained by TDOT
- Length: 42.81 mi (68.90 km)
- Existed: October 1, 1923–present

Major junctions
- West end: near the Mississippi River at Golddust
- US 51 at Ripley; SR 180 at Nutbush; SR 54 / SR 87 at Brownsville; US 70 / US 79 / SR 76 at Brownsville
- East end: I-40 Exit 60 at Mercer Rd

Location
- Country: United States
- State: Tennessee
- Counties: Lauderdale; Haywood

Highway system
- Tennessee State Routes; Interstate; US; State
← SR 18	→ US 19

State Route 19 (SR 19) or the Tina Turner Highway is a state highway in Haywood and Lauderdale counties in Tennessee, United States. State Route 19 is 42.81 miles (68.90 km) long.

The Mississippi River valley with flood plains and bluffs, the rolling hills of Tennessee, and cotton fields dominate the rural landscape of the area traversed by SR 19. Industries are present in the urban areas of Ripley and Brownsville.

A segment of SR 19 between Brownsville and Nutbush was named "Tina Turner Highway" in 2002 after singer Tina Turner, who spent her childhood in Nutbush. SR 19 is mentioned in her song "Nutbush City Limits". The highway is located on the southeastern edge of the New Madrid Seismic Zone, an area with a high earthquake risk. At the west end of the route, Island No. 30 of the Mississippi River was created by earthquake activity in the early 19th century, when the river changed course permanently.

== Counties traversed ==
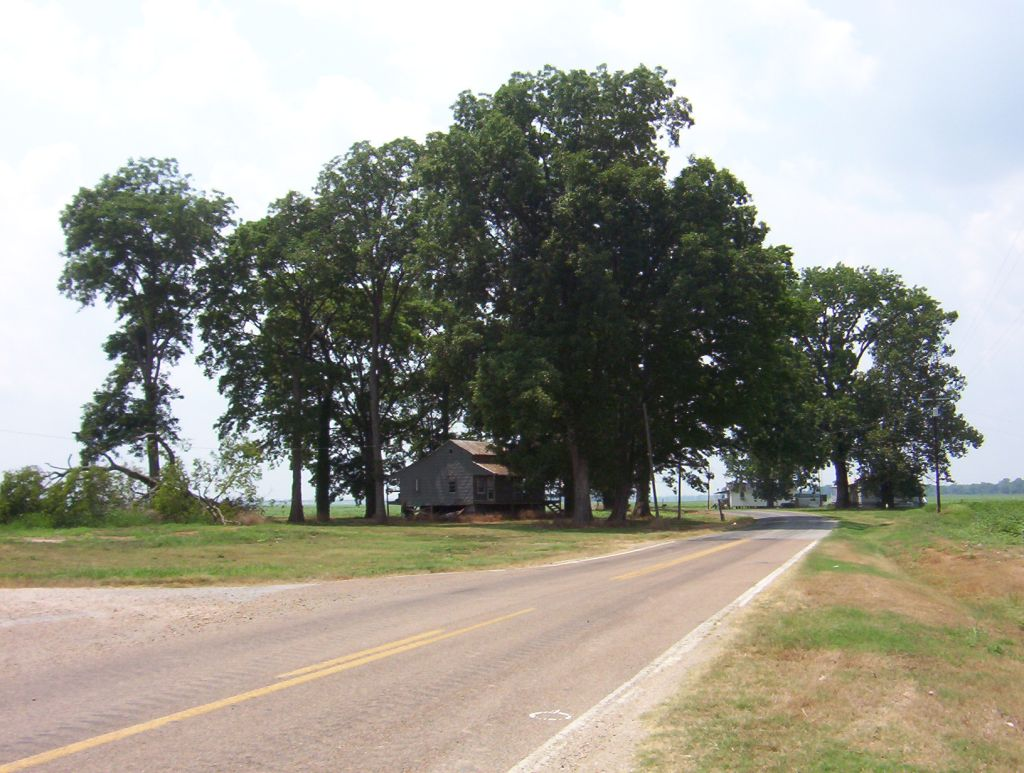
SR 19 in Golddust (2008)

State Route 19 traverses the counties (west to east) shown in the table below.

Counties traversed by State Route 19
County	mi	km
Lauderdale	26.17	42.12
Haywood	16.64	26.78

== Route description ==
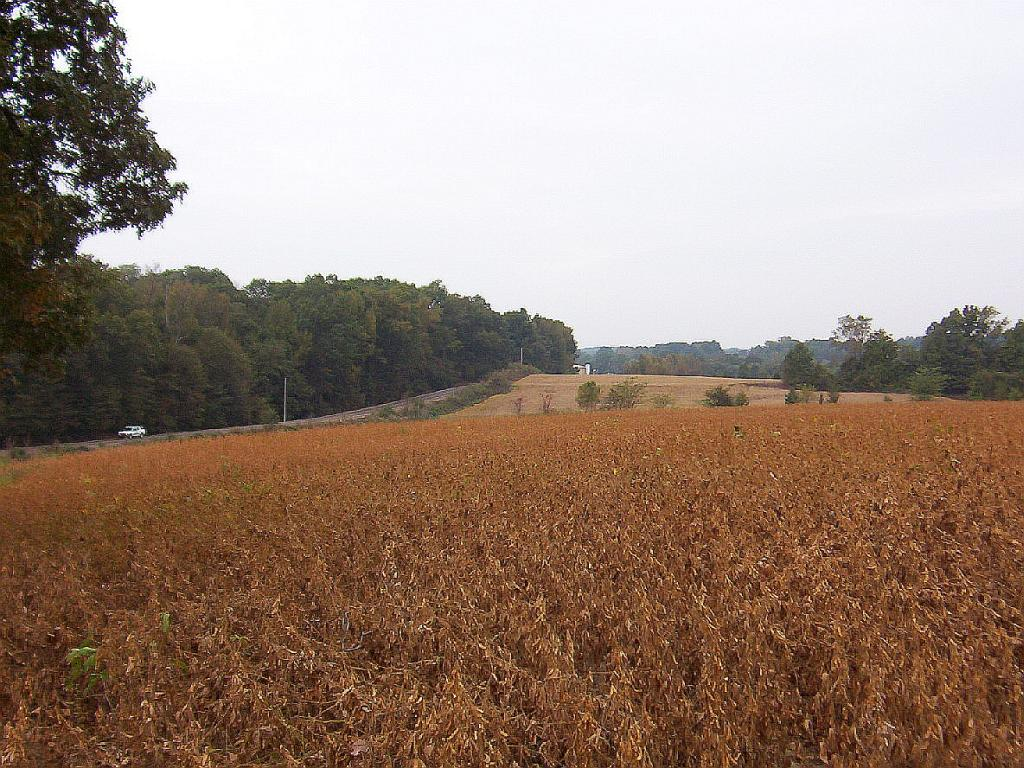
Scenic view on SR 19 in Lauderdale County in 2004

State Route 19 begins in Golddust at the intersection of Crutcher Lake Road and Four Mile Lane. The first several miles of SR 19 traverse the Mississippi River valley with expansive flood plains and large farmland. SR 19 ascends a steep bluff and traverses the rolling hills of West Tennessee as it continues east through Ripley, Nutbush, and Brownsville to reach its eastern terminus at Interstate 40.

=== Mississippi River to Ripley ===
From Golddust in Lauderdale County all the way east to Ripley, SR 19 is designated secondary. It intersects US 51 west of Ripley, east of the US 51 intersection, the route continues designated primary.

Starting near the banks of the Mississippi River, SR 19 runs northeast, parallel to the river, for about five miles (8.0 km) in the flood plains. It continues east, through the bluffs, then passing low cotton fields and hills until it reaches Ripley, also in Lauderdale County.

On a one-mile-long (1.6 km) bypass west of Ripley, SR 19 and US 51 overlap on the US 51 Bypass. South of Ripley, at the southern end of the overlap with US 51, SR 19 Bypass continues eastbound for 2.5 miles (4.0 km), ending at Linda Rd in Ripley and continuing as primary SR 19.

Mississippi River Island No. 30, located at the west end of SR 19 near Golddust, was created during the 1811–12 New Madrid earthquakes when the Mississippi River changed course permanently.

=== Ripley to Brownsville ===
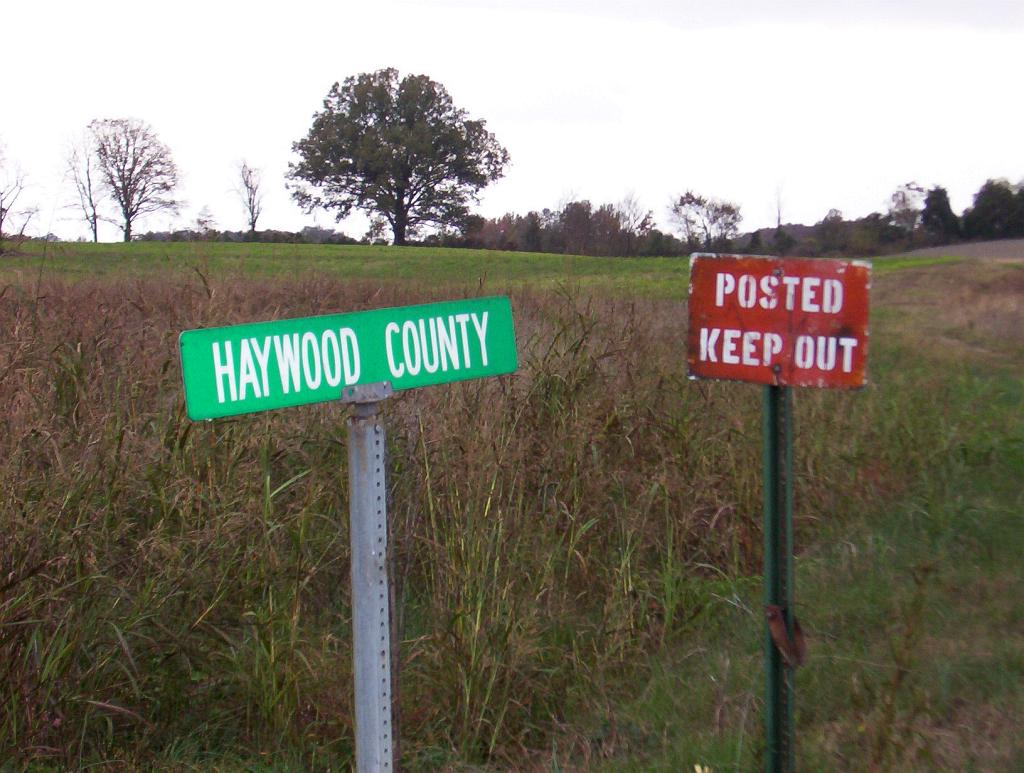
Scenic view in Haywood County in 2004

Between Ripley in Lauderdale County and Brownsville in Haywood County, the route is designated as a primary highway.

The segment passes through a hilly landscape, dominated by cotton fields. From Ripley, SR 19 continues through the unincorporated community of Nutbush in Haywood County all the way to Brownsville.

In Nutbush, SR 180 starts, continuing north to Gates.

Historic State Route 19 is east of Nutbush in Haywood County, where a section of old SR 19 parallels present-day SR 19 just south of the route for about 5 miles (8.0 km) through a rural area along cotton fields and through the rolling hills of West Tennessee.

In 2002, SR 19 between Nutbush and Brownsville and was named "Tina Turner Highway" after singer Tina Turner, who spent her childhood in Nutbush.

=== Brownsville to Interstate 40 ===
The segment of SR 19 east of Brownsville in Haywood County to the eastern terminus of SR 19 at I-40 Exit 60 (Mercer Road), also in Haywood County, is designated secondary.

In Brownsville, SR 19 intersects SR 54 (Main Street). South of Brownsville, the route intersects US 70 and US 79. SR 19 and US 70/US 79 overlap for two miles (3.2 km) on the US 70/US 79 bypass south of Brownsville. At Jefferson Street, US 70/US 79 continue north, and SR 19 leaves the overlap and continues east as secondary SR 19 all the way to I-40.

Industries are present along the route in the urban area between Brownsville and I-40. The agricultural landscape of the area east of Brownsville is dominated by cotton fields.

== Points of interest ==
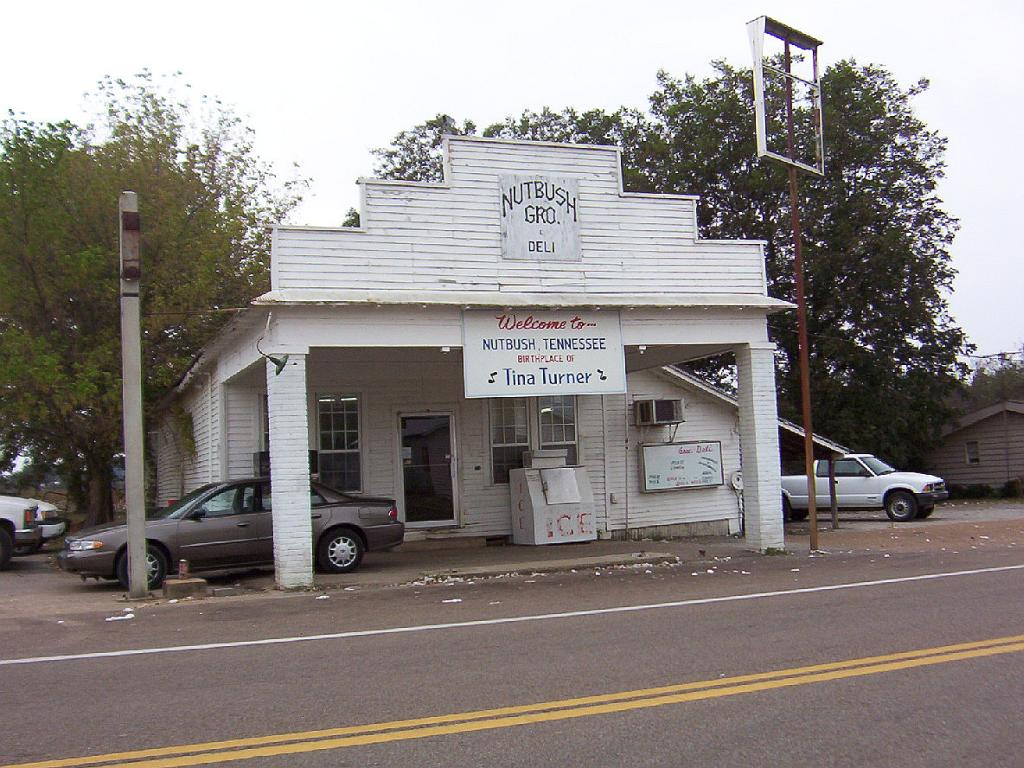
Nutbush, Tennessee, childhood home of singer Tina Turner on State Route 19 (2004)

Points of interest along State Route 19 (west to east).

- Mississippi River
- Lauderdale County Tomato Festival, Ripley
- Nutbush, Tennessee, childhood home of singer Tina Turner
- Trinity United Methodist Church, Nutbush
- Woodlawn Baptist Church and Cemetery, Nutbush

== History ==
=== Earthquake risk ===
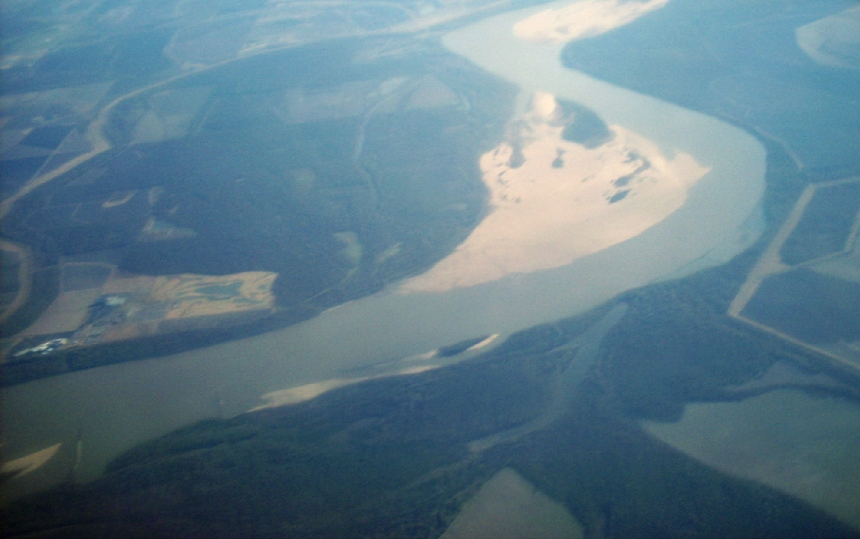
During an earthquake, a meander in the river could be cut short, creating a new river island. (2005)

SR 19 is situated on the southeastern edge of the New Madrid Seismic Zone, an area with a high earthquake risk.

In 1811 and 1812, several earthquakes with an epicenter near New Madrid, Missouri, caused permanent changes in the course of the Mississippi River in a wide area, including the Mississippi River valley in West Tennessee.

==== Mississippi River Island No. 30 ====
At the western terminus of SR 19, northwest of Golddust, Tennessee, Island No. 30 of the Mississippi River was created during the New Madrid earthquakes when the Mississippi River changed course permanently, shortening the river by about 1.5 miles (2.4 km), and cutting off part of Lauderdale County, Tennessee, placing it on the other side of the river, the Mississippi County, Arkansas, side northeast of Osceola.

=== Agriculture and industry ===
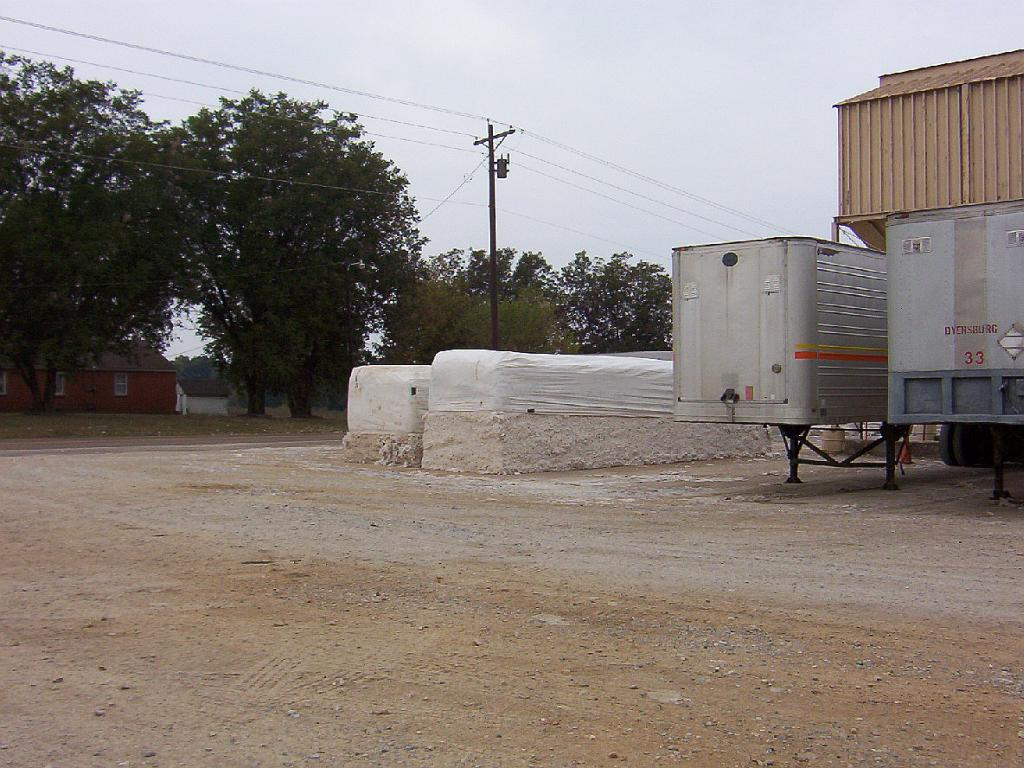
Cotton gin in Nutbush, Haywood County (2004)

After the abolition of slavery, sharecropping was the primary means of income for low-income families in the area along SR 19. Mostly for the cultivation of cotton, land would be used by sharecroppers in return for a share of the crop to the landowner.

==== Modern agriculture ====
Modern machines like the cotton picker have made the manual cultivation obsolete over time as they took over the work from the hand laborers.

In 2006, a cotton-processing plant existed in Nutbush at the junction of SR 180 and SR 19.

The Lauderdale County Tomato Festival is an annual celebration of the tomato close to SR 19 in Ripley.

==== Lagoon Creek Peaking Facility ====
Lagoon Creek Peaking Facility is run by the Tennessee Valley Authority (TVA) in Nutbush not far from SR 19. From eight gas turbines the power plant generates electric power for the area in times of high demand.

=== Pioneer musicians ===
The early black and white musicians and singers from the Nutbush churches along today's SR 19 recorded and influenced an international audience.

Nutbush is the birthplace and home community of black and white pioneer musicians and prominent recording artists such as Hambone Willie Newbern and Sleepy John Estes. Harmonica player Noah Lewis of Henning, Tennessee, is buried in an area cemetery near Nutbush.

=== Tina Turner Highway ===
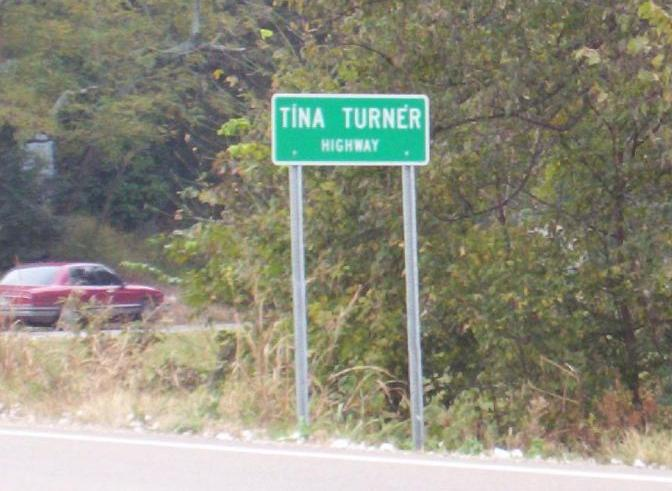
Tina Turner Highway in Nutbush, Haywood County in 2004

Tina Turner spent her childhood in Nutbush, Tennessee, seven miles (11 km) northwest of Brownsville. In 2002, SR 19 between Nutbush and Brownsville was officially designated "Tina Turner Highway" in honor of the singer.

==== "Nutbush City Limits" ====
SR 19 is mentioned in the Tina Turner 1973 song "Nutbush City Limits". The song was produced by her husband Ike Turner as "Highway number nineteen".

According to the song, there was a speed limit of 25 miles per hour (40 km/h) ("Twenty-five was the speed limit") on SR 19 in the city of Nutbush at one time.

=== Historic State Route 19 ===
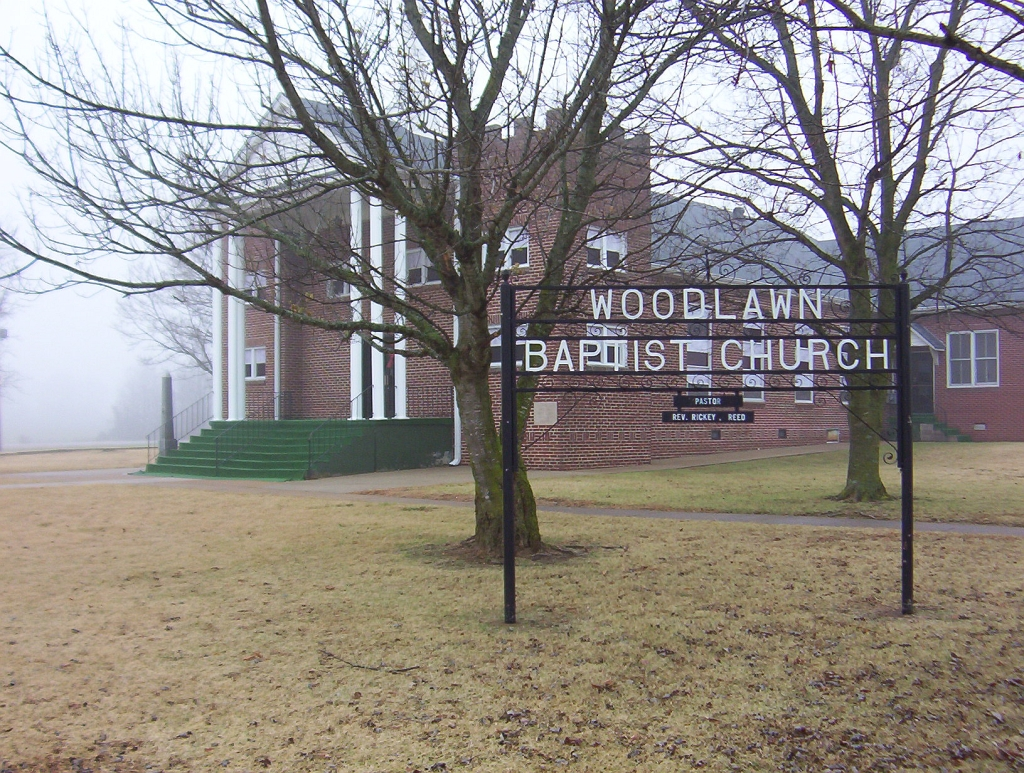
Woodlawn Baptist Church in Nutbush in 2007

East of Nutbush, in Haywood County, a section of Old SR 19 parallels present-day SR 19 just south of the main route for about five miles (8.0 km), covering about two-thirds of the distance from Nutbush to Brownsville on the old route through a rural area along cotton fields and through the rolling hills of West Tennessee.

Trinity United Methodist Church, founded in 1822, is located just south of Nutbush, along old SR 19.

Woodlawn Baptist Church, a US historic location, is on Woodlawn Rd., about three miles (4.8 km) southeast of Nutbush, just north of old SR 19. The church was a family church of Tina Turner. She attended and sang in the choir during her youth. Her family members were church officials, musicians, and singers who are buried in the cemetery.

Old SR 19 and SR 19 join again at Bobby Mann Rd, three miles (4.8 km) northwest of Brownsville.

== Major intersections ==
County	Location	mi	km	Destinations	Notes
Lauderdale	Golddust	0	0.0	Crutcher Lake Road / Great River Road south	Western terminus; SR 19 begins in secondary designation; Great River Road follows Crutcher Lake Road south to SR 87
Lauderdale	Ripley	19	31	US 51 north (Jefferson Davis Highway/SR 3) / Great River Road north – Gates, Halls	Western end of US 51 concurrency; eastern end of Great River Road concurrency
Lauderdale	Ripley	20	32	US 51 south (Jefferson Davis Highway/SR 3) – Covington	Eastearn end of US 51 cocurrency; SR 19 changes to primary designation
Lauderdale	Ripley	21	34	SR 209 (Washington Street) – Ripley, Henning	
Haywood	Nutbush	35	56	SR 180 north (Forked Deer Rd) – Gates	
Haywood	Nutbush	35.2	56.6	Old State Route 19 (east)	
Haywood	Nutbush	36.4	58.6	Old State Route 19 (west)	
Haywood	Brownsville	38.2	61.5	SR 87 west (Fulton Road) – Henning	To Fort Pillow State Park
Haywood	Brownsville	39	63	SR 54 (Main Street) – Covington, Brownsville	
Haywood	Brownsville	40	64	US 70 west / US 79 south (Grand Avenue/SR 1) – Stanton	Western end of US 70/US 79/SR 1 concurrency
Haywood	Brownsville	42	68	SR 76 south (Anderson Avenue) to I-40 – Somerville	Western end of SR 76 northbound concurrency
Haywood	Brownsville	42.8	68.9	US 70 east / US 79 north (Dupree Street/SR 1/SR 76) – Bells, Jackson	Eastern end of US 70/US 79/SR 1/SR 76 concurrency; SR 19 turns secondary
Haywood	Brownsville			I-40 – Nashville, Memphis	Eastern terminus; I&8309;40 Exit 60; roadway continues as Mercer Road; SR 19 ends in secondary designation
1.000 mi = 1.609 km; 1.000 km = 0.621 mi: Concurrency terminus

== See also ==
- List of Tennessee state highways
- List of highways numbered 19
- Nutbush City Limits, (Tina Turner song)
