= Tennessee State Route 180 =

Highway in Tennessee

State Route 180
- Forked Deer Rd (Nutbush); Gates Rd (Gates)
- SR 180 highlighted in red

Route information
- Maintained by TDOT
- Length: 12.52 mi (20.15 km)
- Existed: July 1, 1983–present

Major junctions
- South end: SR 19 in Nutbush
- SR 88 near Gates; SR 88 / SR 209 in Gates
- North end: US 51 near Gates

Location
- Country: United States
- State: Tennessee
- Counties: Haywood, Lauderdale

Highway system
- Tennessee State Routes; Interstate; US; State
← SR 179	→ SR 181

State Route 180 (abbreviated SR 180) is a secondary south–north highway in Haywood and Lauderdale Counties, Tennessee, United States. State Route 180 is 12.52 mi (20.1 km) long.

== Route description ==
State Route 180 starts in Nutbush in Haywood County, childhood home of singer Tina Turner, and continues north to Gates in Lauderdale County.

The rolling hills of Tennessee and cotton fields dominate the rural landscape of the area traversed by SR 180.

State Route 180 is located on the southeastern edge of the New Madrid Seismic Zone, an area with a high earthquake risk.

== Points of interest ==
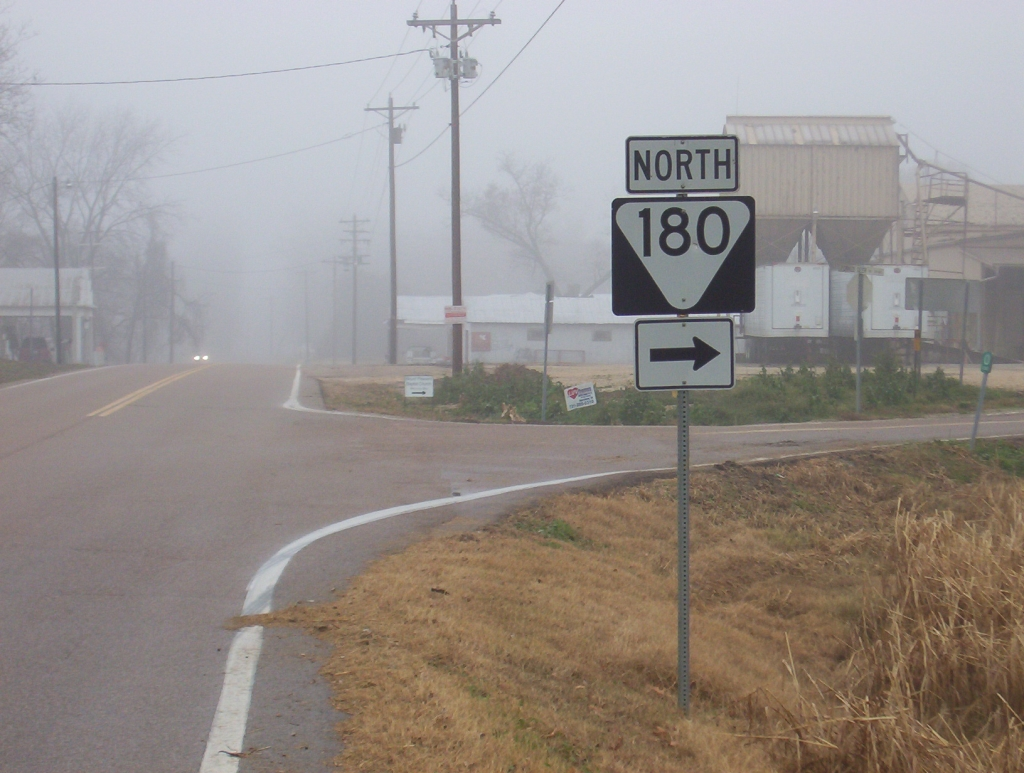
Southern terminus of SR 180 at SR 19 in Nutbush (2007)

Points of interest along State Route 180 (south to north).

- Nutbush, Tennessee, childhood home of singer Tina Turner
- Trinity United Methodist Church, Nutbush

== Major intersections ==
County	Location	mi	km	Destinations	Notes
Haywood	Nutbush	0.00	0.00	SR 19 (Tina Turner Highway) – Brownsville, Ripley	Southern terminus
Lauderdale		9.90	15.93	SR 88 east – Maury City	South end of SR 88 overlap
Lauderdale	Gates	11.9	19.2	SR 88 west / SR 209 south (2nd Street) – Halls	North end of SR 88 overlap; south end of SR 209 overlap; northern terminus of SR 209; OLD US 51
Lauderdale	Gates	12.0	19.3	SR 209 south (2nd Street) – Ripley	North end of wrong-way SR 209 overlap; OLD US 51
Lauderdale		12.52	20.15	US 51 (SR 3) – Dyersburg, Memphis	Northern terminus
1.000 mi = 1.609 km; 1.000 km = 0.621 mi: Concurrency terminus
