= Tennessee State Route 209 =

State highway in Tennessee, United States

State Route 209
- SR 209 highlighted in red

Route information
- Maintained by TDOT
- Length: 17.5 mi (28.2 km)
- Existed: July 1, 1983–present

Major junctions
- South end: US 51 near Henning
- SR 19 in Ripley
- North end: SR 88 / SR 180 in Gates

Location
- Country: United States
- State: Tennessee
- Counties: Lauderdale

Highway system
- Tennessee State Routes; Interstate; US; State
← SR 208	→ SR 210

State Route 209 (SR 209) is a 17.5-mile-long (28.2 km) state highway in Lauderdale County in the western portion of the U.S. state of Tennessee. It connects US 51 with the cities and towns of Henning, Ripley and Gates and, via SR 88, Halls.

== Route description ==
SR 209 begins at an intersection with US 51/SR 3 south of Henning. It then proceeds northeastward and enters the Henning city limits and in downtown Henning SR 209 has a brief concurrency with SR 87. It then continues northward and enters Ripley city limits. It has a half-interchange with SR 19 and enters downtown Ripley and serves as the southern terminus for SR 208. After this it mainly enters rural countryside and follows a railroad line for about seven miles (11 km) until it reaches the town of Gates where it has a brief concurrency with SR 180 and ends at an intersection with SR 88 and SR 180.

== History ==
All of SR 209 is a former alignment of US 51.

== Junction list ==
The entire route is in Lauderdale County.

Location	mi	km	Destinations	Notes
	0.0	0.0	US 51 (Jefferson Davis Highway/SR 3) – Covington, Ripley	Southern terminus
Henning			SR 87 east (McFarland Avenue) – Brownsville	Southern end of SR 87 concurrency
Henning			SR 87 west (Graves Avenue) – Fort Pillow State Historic Park	Northern end of SR 87 concurrency
Ripley			SR 19 (State Route 19 Bypass) – Brownsville	Half-interchange
Ripley			SR 208 north (Cleveland Street)	Southern terminus of SR 208
Gates			SR 180 north (Huntington Street) to US 51	Southern end of SR 180 concurrency
Gates	17.5	28.2	SR 88 (Second Street/East Wardlow Road) / SR 180 south (East Wardlow Road) – Halls, Nutbush, Maury City	Northern end of SR 180 concurrency; northern terminus of SR 209
1.000 mi = 1.609 km; 1.000 km = 0.621 mi: Concurrency terminus
