= Golddust, Tennessee =

- Unincorporated community
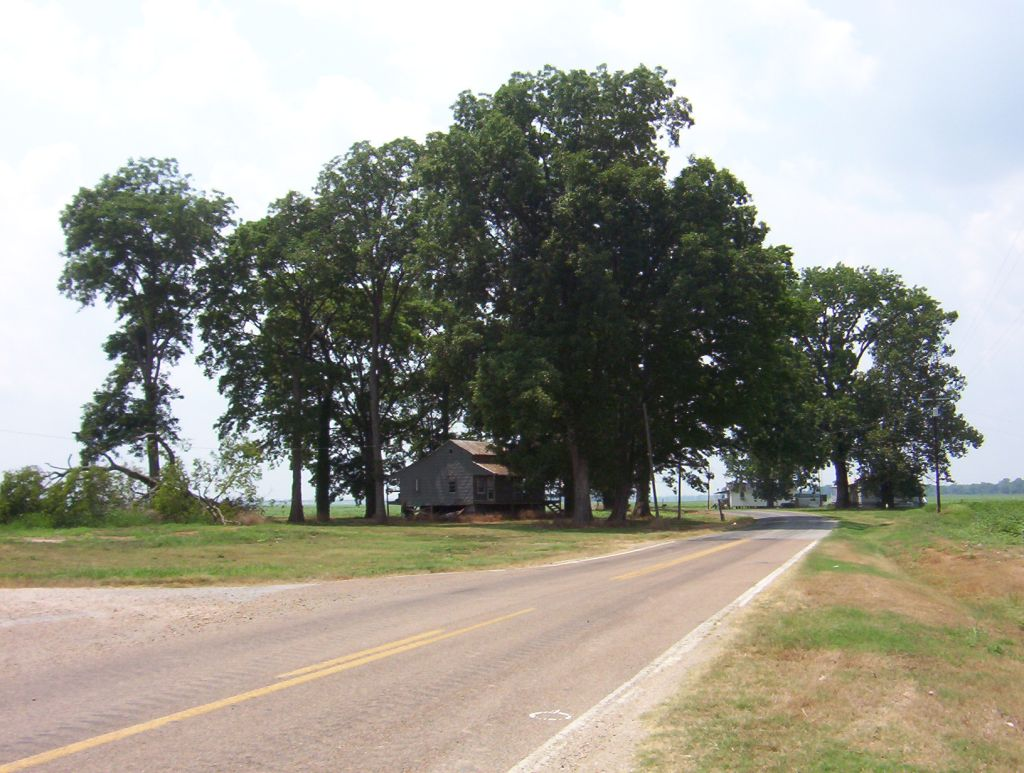

- Location in the State of Tennessee
- Coordinates: 35°43′31″N 89°51′31″W
- Country: United States
- State: Tennessee
- Counties: Lauderdale
- Elevation: 249 ft (76 m)
- Time zone: UTC-6 (CST)
  - Summer (DST): UTC-5 (CDT)
- ZIP code: 38063 (Ripley, Tennessee)
- GNIS feature ID: 1285588

Golddust is a rural unincorporated community in Lauderdale County, Tennessee, United States. It is located on the banks of the Mississippi River. Golddust is one of the earliest European-American settlements in Lauderdale County.

In 1864, the Battle of Fort Pillow was fought approximately 3 miles (4.8 km) south of Golddust.

== History ==
=== Establishment ===
Golddust was founded in the 1820s. It is one of the earliest European-American settlements in Lauderdale County.

=== Battle of Fort Pillow ===
In 1861, the Confederate States Army built extensive fortifications south of Golddust and named the site for General Gideon J. Pillow. Because of its strategic location overlooking the Mississippi River, the Union Army took control of the fort in 1862 after the Confederates left. The Union Army occupied Tennessee through the end of the war. The Confederates under Major General Nathan Bedford Forrest returned to this site in 1864 in the Battle of Fort Pillow, defeating Union troops and massacring a majority of the black troops among them. Forrest briefly held the fort before leaving again.

Fort Pillow State Park is located approximately 3 miles (4.8 km) south of Golddust.

== Geography ==
Island No. 30 of the Mississippi River is located approximately 2.5 miles (4 km) west of Golddust. The landscape of the area is dominated by the Mississippi River valley, flood plains and cotton fields. Most dwellings in the area are built on stilts to withstand floods.

Golddust is situated on the southeastern edge of the New Madrid Seismic Zone, an area with a high earthquake risk.

== Economy ==
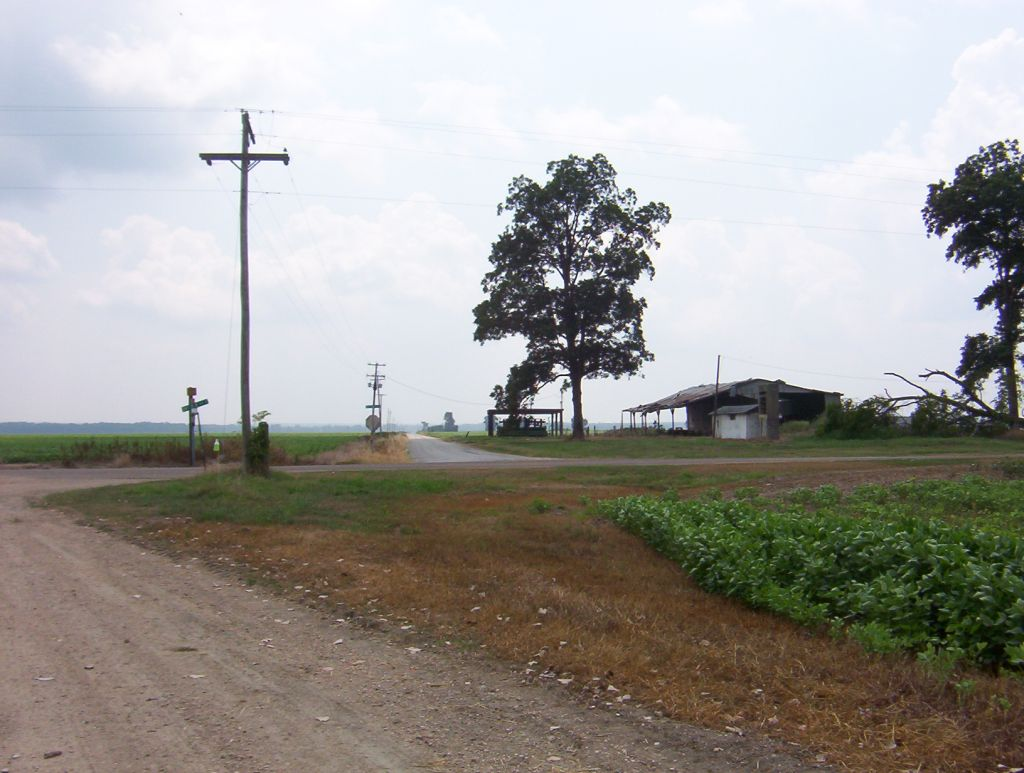
Four Mile Lane in Golddust (2008)

Agriculture is the chief source of income in the area surrounding Golddust, especially the cultivation of cotton.

After the abolition of slavery, sharecropping was the primary means of income for both black and white families in the area. Sharecroppers cultivated a portion of land in return for a share of the crop when the landowner sold the cotton.

Since the early 20th century, mechanization of agriculture caused the loss of many farm worker jobs. Modern machines such as the cotton picker have made manual cultivation obsolete. In the 21st century, most cotton in this area and other crops are cultivated on large industrial farms.

As of 2007, there were no industries in Golddust. Dwellings are scattered, some of them abandoned. The borders of the community are unmarked.

== Infrastructure ==
Tennessee State Route 19 starts at the Mississippi River in Golddust, heading east through Ripley (Lauderdale County), Nutbush and Brownsville (both in Haywood County) to Interstate 40.

== Notable people ==
- Linda Taylor, criminal and welfare abuser referred to as the "welfare queen" in the 1980s
