= Linda Taylor =

American criminal (1926–2002)

- Taylor leaving a courtroom in Chicago during a recess in her trial on March 8, 1977.
- Born: Martha Louise White c. January 1926; Golddust, Tennessee, U.S.
- Died: April 18, 2002 (aged 76); Harvey, Illinois, U.S.
- Other names: Martha Louise Miller; Connie Walker; Linda Bennett; Linda Jones; Connie Jarvis; Linda Lynch; Linda Sholvia
- Known for: Welfare fraud
- Status: Convicted
- Convictions: Fraud; Perjury
- Penalty: 3–7 years imprisonment

Details
- Date apprehended: August 2, 1974
- Imprisoned at: Dwight Correctional Center, Nevada Township, Illinois, U.S. (1978–1980)

Linda Taylor (born Martha Louise White; c. January 1926 – April 18, 2002) was an American woman who committed extensive welfare fraud and, after the publication of an article in the Chicago Tribune in fall 1974, became identified as the "welfare queen". Accounts of Taylor's activities were used by then-presidential candidate Ronald Reagan, for his 1976 presidential campaign onwards, to illustrate his criticisms of social programs in the United States. Her criminal activities are believed to have extended beyond welfare fraud and may have included assault, theft, insurance fraud, bigamy, kidnapping, and possibly even murder.

== Identity and early life ==
Taylor was born to Lydia Mooney White in Golddust, Tennessee, a few months after White moved there from Summit, Alabama. Although no birth certificate was issued, biographer Josh Levin estimates, based on other details provided by Taylor's relatives, that the birth probably occurred in January 1926. At birth she was named Martha Louise White. In October 1926, Lydia White married Joseph Jackson Miller, and subsequent United States Census records listed "Martha Louise Miller" as their daughter. The identity of Taylor's biological father is uncertain. In census records and court testimony, her relatives gave varying information about her parentage but always identified her as "white". Rumors in the family indicated that her father was black but Lydia White could have been convicted of a felony under Alabama's law against interracial relationships if she admitted this.

As of 1940, Taylor was 13 years old and had attended school only through the second grade. She left home in her teens and traveled to the Pacific Coast. In Seattle, she was arrested three times before the age of 20, on charges of vagrancy, disorderly conduct, and prostitution. In 1948, she was arrested in Oakland for contributing to the delinquency of a minor (having sex in the presence of a child). She also traveled around the country with her children. In the late 1950s, she settled in Peoria, Illinois. Around 1960, she moved to Chicago with three of her children.

Taylor was married six times. She had five children from her first two marriages, both of which ended in divorce. Four of her children, who traveled with her, were remembered by people who knew the family. Her known children included three sons, born in 1941, 1948, and 1950, and a daughter born in the early 1950s.

Throughout her life, Taylor presented herself as being of various racial and ethnic identities, including Black, Asian, Hispanic, and Jewish. Taylor represented herself as being many different ages, with one government official stating in 1974 that "it appears she can be any age she wishes, from the early 20s to the early 50s". Although she became best known under the name Linda Taylor, news reports indicated that she used as many as 80 different names, often with false identification documents to match. Her aliases included Linda Bennett, Connie Jarvis, Linda Jones, Constance Loyd, Linda Lynch, Linda Mallexo, Linda Ray, Constance Rayne, Linda Sholvia, Linda Taylor, Constance Wakefield, and Connie Walker. Her many identities included using the title 'Reverend' and posing as a nurse, a doctor, and a spiritual adviser who used Haitian Vodou.

== Arrest, trial and media coverage ==
On August 8, 1974, Taylor filed a police report claiming that she had been robbed of $14,000—equivalent to $91,000 in 2025—in "cash, jewelry, and furs". Chicago Detectives Jack Sherwin and Jerry Kush, who took the report, recognized her from a similar, previous report and she came under suspicion for false reporting, for which she was later charged. Additionally, Taylor was suspected of welfare fraud after Sherwin found welfare payment checks made out to multiple different names in her apartment.

Upon investigating her, Sherwin discovered Taylor was wanted on welfare fraud charges in Michigan. She was arrested at the end of August 1974 for possible extradition to Michigan. Released on bond, Taylor fled the state and was a fugitive until October 9, 1974, when she was caught in Tucson, Arizona. While the detectives had problems gaining the interest of the offices of both the state and federal attorneys, the media in the Chicago area became receptive to what the detectives told them. The case was used in conflicts among members of the Illinois state legislature and between Governor Dan Walker and his opponents, with the Taylor case being cited to support claims about welfare fraud being out of control.

Upon her return to Illinois, prosecutors opened a 31-count indictment against Taylor for fraud, perjury and bigamy, alleging that she had received welfare and Social Security checks under multiple names. Her attorney, R. Eugene Pincham, managed to delay the trial until March 1977, by which time the charges had been considerably reduced. Initial allegations involving 80 aliases and over $100,000 in fraudulently obtained funds had been narrowed to charges involving $8,000—equivalent to $43,000 in 2025—obtained through four aliases, and charges of perjury in her testimony before a grand jury. The bigamy charges were dropped. After a trial lasting less than three weeks, the jury deliberated for about seven hours before finding her guilty on March 17, 1977. Taylor was sentenced to imprisonment for two to six years on the welfare fraud charges, and a year on the perjury charges, to be served consecutively. She began her sentence at Dwight Correctional Center on February 16, 1978.

Ronald Reagan, as a presidential candidate in 1976, regularly made claims about the welfare state being broken and repeatedly alluded to the Linda Taylor case, although he did not refer to her by name. At campaign rallies in January 1976 during the New Hampshire primary, Reagan claimed her income had been $150,000—equivalent to $849,000 in 2025—a year, a figure which was derived from a Chicago Tribune report. After he had lost the Republican nomination to Gerald Ford, Reagan said in an October radio broadcast that "her take is estimated at a million dollars", a claim which, according to her biographer Josh Levin, appears to be unsourced. Other claims Reagan made about her "three new cars", including a Cadillac, were true. Her fraudulent claims have since been estimated at $40,000—equivalent to $197,000 in 2025—over a number of years; however, she was only charged with stealing about $8,000 because of difficulties with assembling verifiable evidence.

== Other suspected crimes ==
Taylor was believed to be a kidnapper, and possibly a murderer, but these offenses were never properly substantiated through an investigation. Three people she knew well in the 1970s and 1980s died under suspicious circumstances. Taylor is suspected of being the woman who posed as a nurse and abducted an infant, Paul Joseph Fronczak, from the Michael Reese Hospital in Chicago in late April 1964. Taylor's son has said that his mother frequently took other people's children, and law enforcement also suspected her in the case. Based on the results of genetic testing, Fronczak was confirmed to be living in Michigan in December 2019.

== Later years and death ==
Taylor was released from prison on parole on April 11, 1980. Her parole was completed on May 26, 1981. Taylor rejoined Sherman Ray, whom she had married shortly before her arrest in 1974. On August 25, 1983, Ray was shot by Willtrue Loyd, in what was later ruled to be an accident. Taylor collected on Ray's life insurance. Loyd and Taylor moved to Florida and subsequently married in March 1986. When Loyd died in 1992, Taylor (under the alias Linda Lynch) was listed as his next of kin but claimed to be his granddaughter rather than his wife. Taylor died of a heart attack on April 18, 2002, at Ingalls Memorial Hospital outside Chicago. Her remains were cremated.
