= Josh Levin =

American writer and journalist (born 1980)

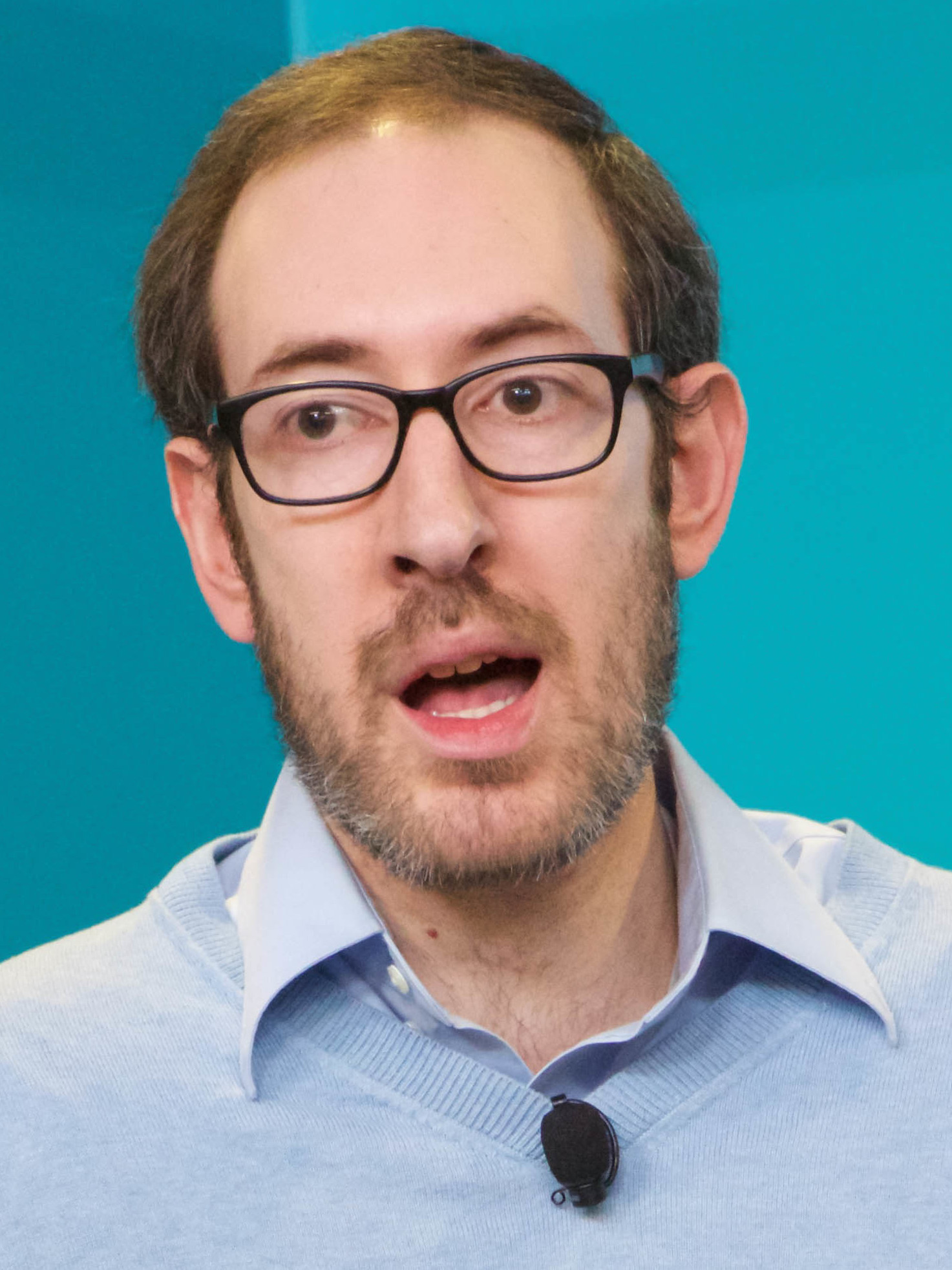
- Levin in 2017
- Born: Joshua Benjamin Levin; March 15, 1980 (age 46); New Orleans, Louisiana, U.S.
- Education: Brown University
- Occupation: National editor of Slate magazine
- Notable credit(s): Slate magazine, Hang Up and Listen
- Website: http://www.josh-levin.com/

Joshua Benjamin Levin (born March 15, 1980) is an American writer and the former editorial director at Slate magazine. Levin also hosts the magazine's sports podcast, Hang Up and Listen.

== Biography ==
=== Early life ===
Levin was born and raised in New Orleans, Louisiana. He attended Brown University, where he earned degrees in computer science and history.

=== Career ===
After graduating from Brown University, Levin began his journalism career as an intern at the Washington City Paper in Washington, D.C. He joined Slate in 2003, where he became the editorial director.

In addition to writing and editing, he hosted Slate's sports podcast Hang Up and Listen with the journalist Stefan Fatsis and Joel Anderson.

During R. Kelly's 2008 trial for child pornography, Levin coined the term "Shaggy Defence" to describe the Kelly's lawyers. The term was based on Shaggy's song "It Wasn't Me" and its lyrics and, is used to describe denying an allegation, despite strong evidence to the contrary.

In 2013, for Slate, Levin wrote an article on Linda Taylor, a woman that was dubbed by the Chicago Tribune and Ronald Reagan as a "welfare queen." The article, which explored Taylor's history of criminal acts, some allegedly neglected by the authorities and more serious than those for which she was convicted, was praised by media sources. The Washington Monthly described Levin's article as "the most fascinating true crime read of the year."

In 2019, Levin wrote The Queen: The Forgotten Life Behind an American Myth. The book expanded upon the life of Linda Taylor and her repeated acts of fraud and theft. The book won the 2019 National Book Critics Circle Award (Biography). Levin also hosted the Slate podcast, The Queen, a four-episode mini series about Linda Taylor and Reagan Era politics, along with two bonus episodes. The Queen was at one time in the process of being adapted into a feature film, to be directed by Bertie Ellwood.

== Awards ==
- Association of Alternative Newsweeklies' Media Reporting/Criticism Award in 2004 — for the article titled "Off Target", co-written with Erik Wemple, published in the Washington City Paper which helped to break the Jayson Blair plagiarism scandal.
