= Tennessee State Route 208 =

Short north-south state highway in Ripley, Tennessee

State Route 208
- Cleveland Street
- SR 208 highlighted in red

Route information
- Maintained by TDOT
- Length: 1.44 mi (2.32 km)
- Existed: July 1, 1983–present

Major junctions
- South end: SR 209 in Ripley
- North end: US 51 in Ripley

Location
- Country: United States
- State: Tennessee
- Counties: Lauderdale

Highway system
- Tennessee State Routes; Interstate; US; State
← SR 207	→ SR 209

State Route 208 (SR 208) is a short 1.44 mile long north-south state highway in Ripley, Tennessee, United States. For its entire length, SR 208 is known as Cleveland Street.

== Route description ==
SR 208 begins in downtown at an intersection with SR 209 (Monroe Street), and it curves to the north to have an intersection with Lake Drive. It then heads northwest as a recently improved 2-lane highway with a center turn lane as it passes through neighborhoods. The highway then passes through farmland, where it crosses over a creek, before entering a business district and coming to an end at an intersection with US 51/SR 3 (Jefferson Davis Street).

== Major intersections ==
The entire route is in Ripley, Lauderdale County.

mi	km	Destinations	Notes
0.0	0.0	SR 209 (Monroe Street) – Henning, Gates	Southern terminus
1.44	2.32	US 51 (Jefferson Davis Highway/SR 3) – Henning, Gates	Northern terminus
1.000 mi = 1.609 km; 1.000 km = 0.621 mi
