= Lauderdale County Tomato Festival =

Lauderdale County Tomato Festival is an annual celebration of the tomato in Ripley, Lauderdale County, U.S.A.

In addition to a tomato contest and an attempt to break the record for the "World's Longest 'Mater Sandwich", festival events have included carnival rides, an exhibit of "special treasures", and a display of antique cards.....tomatoes are thrown to each other's face

== History ==
The festival began in 1984, being held at the town square. Events have included local talent, tomato tasting, and fun activities for children. 36 years later, the first fest casualty occurred: the COVID-19 pandemic caused officials to scrap the festival & defer to 2021.
