= Welfare queen =

Derogatory term for welfare abusers

"Welfare queen" is a derogatory term used in the United States to describe individuals who are perceived to misuse or abuse the welfare system, often through fraudulent means, child endangerment, or manipulation. The media's coverage of welfare fraud began in the early 1960s and was featured in general-interest publications such as Reader's Digest. The term gained widespread recognition following media reporting in 1974 regarding the case of Linda Taylor. Accounts of her activities were used by Ronald Reagan, beginning with his 1976 presidential campaign, although he never identified her by name or race.

Since its inception, the phrase "welfare queen" has remained a stigmatizing label and has at times been disproportionately associated with black, single mothers. This stereotype implies that these women intentionally have multiple children to maximize their welfare benefits, avoid seeking employment, and live extravagantly at the expense of taxpayers. As a result, it has been widely criticized as racist by many observers, as many white, Latino, Asian, Jewish and Arab Americans are also welfare recipients.

Although women in the U.S. could no longer stay on welfare indefinitely after the federal government launched the Temporary Assistance for Needy Families (TANF) program in 1996, the term remains a trope in the American dialogue on poverty and negatively shapes welfare policies and outcomes for these families.

== Origin ==
The idea of welfare fraud goes back to the early 1960s, when the majority of known offenders were male. Despite this, many journalistic exposés were published at the time on those who would come to be known as welfare queens. Reader's Digest and Look magazine published sensational stories about mothers gaming the system. The emergence of the "Welfare queen" stereotype occurred during a period of significant social change in the United States. The Civil Rights Movement of the 1950s and 1960s challenged racial segregation and discrimination, leading to legal and societal changes aimed at promoting racial equality.

The term was coined in 1974, either by George Bliss of the Chicago Tribune in his articles about Linda Taylor, or by Jet magazine. Neither publication credits the other in their "Welfare Queen" stories of that year. Taylor was ultimately charged with committing $8,000 in fraud (equivalent to $52,227 in 2025) and having four aliases. She was convicted in 1977 of illegally obtaining 23 welfare checks using two aliases and was sentenced to two to six years in prison. During the same decade, Taylor was investigated for alleged kidnapping and baby trafficking, and is suspected of multiple murders, but was never charged.

Reagan used this story to illustrate his criticisms of social programs in the United States, and to rally support for reform of the welfare system. During his initial bid for the Republican nomination in 1976, and again in 1980, Reagan regularly made reference to abuse of the welfare system at his campaign rallies. Some of these stories, and some that followed into the 1990s, focused on female welfare recipients engaged in behavior counter-productive to eventual financial independence such as having children out of wedlock, using AFDC money to buy drugs, or showing little desire to work. Reagan's characterization of these individuals was used to justify real-life changes to policies and play a role in the shrinking of the social safety net. They were also understood to be social parasites, while engaging in self-damaging behavior while draining society of valuable resources. Stories about able-bodied men collecting welfare continued to dominate discourse until the 1970s, at which point women became the main focus of welfare fraud stories (despite these early appearances of the "Welfare Queen" icon).

"She has 80 names, 30 addresses, 12 Social Security cards and is collecting veterans' benefits on four non-existing deceased husbands. And she's collecting Social Security on her cards. She's got Medicaid, getting food stamps, and she is collecting welfare under each of her names. Her tax-free cash income alone is over $150,000."

— Ronald Reagan, Jan 1976, Asheville N.C Campaign Trail Speech

== In political discourse ==
Prior to former President Ronald Reagan's campaign, in the 1960s, the Moynihan Report was created. This report addressed the ways that black people experienced poverty and tried to cite a cause of the inequality in income this group faced. Moynihan's central argument of the report was that the "breakdown" of the black family was the cause of poverty among African-Americans. This argument had two key points, which were black children growing up without a father, and in matriarchal systems, was damaging which contributes to deviancy in children. The report changed the thought process surrounding welfare, specifically concerning welfare laws and policy and the "solution" to poverty. Politicians began to place blame on gender and cultural differences between black and white people rather than welfare laws. While feminists and other activists fought against the ideas birthed from this report, the belief of a fractured black family began to take hold and influence policy.

The term "welfare queen" became a catchphrase during political dialogue of the 1980s and 1990s. The term came under criticism for its supposed use as a political tool and for its derogatory connotations. Criticism focused on the fact that individuals committing welfare fraud were, in reality, a very small percentage of those legitimately receiving welfare. Use of the term was also seen as an attempt to stereotype recipients in order to undermine public support for AFDC.

The welfare queen idea became an integral part of a larger discourse on welfare reform, especially during the bipartisan effort to reform the welfare system under Bill Clinton. Anti-welfare advocates ended AFDC in 1996 and overhauled the system with the introduction of TANF with the belief that welfare discouraged self-reliance. Despite the new system's time-limits, the welfare queen legacy has endured and continues to shape public perception and policy. The current TANF policies restrict welfare support in ways that appear to align with and may be the result of the fears and concerns centered around the welfare queen trope. For example, welfare payments are intended for temporary support (a maximum of five years) and restrict welfare support through work requirements and family caps to avoid the fear of "welfare queens" and other "undeserving" recipients from taking advantage of welfare benefits or from an overly generous welfare system encouraging financial and moral irresponsibility.

During Governor Mitt Romney's 2012 campaign, he alluded to the "welfare queen" stereotype again when he attacked President Barack Obama by spreading television advertisements vilifying President Obama's leniency on the "undeserving" poor through reducing the rigor of TANF requirements to primarily appeal to a white, middle-class demographic who believe in cutting government spending on welfare programs to force people in poverty out of perceived laziness and into self-reliance.

Do you support work for welfare? Barack Obama has a long history of opposing work for welfare... On July 12th, Obama quietly ended work requirements for welfare. You wouldn't have to work and wouldn't have to train for a job. Mitt Romney strongly believes that work must be part of welfare. The Romney plan for a stronger middle class. It will put work back in welfare.

— Governor Mitt Romney, 'Long History', Presidential Campaign Television Ad, August 13, 2012

== Gender and racial stereotypes ==
Political scientist Franklin Gilliam has argued that the welfare queen stereotype has roots in both race and gender:

While poor women of all races get blamed for their impoverished condition, African-American women commit the most egregious violations of American values. This story line taps into stereotypes about both women (uncontrolled sexuality) and African-Americans (laziness).

The trope of the welfare queen may be analyzed from the framework of intersectionality to better understand how race, class, gender, and other identities shape individuals' and groups' privileges and disadvantages.

The media's image of poverty shifted from focusing on the plight of white Appalachian farmers and on the factory closings in the 1960s to a more racially divisive and negative image of poor blacks in urban areas. All of this, according to political scientist Martin Gilens, led to the American public dramatically overestimating the percentage of African-Americans in poverty. By 1973, in magazine pictures depicting welfare recipients, 75% featured African Americans when in fact African Americans made up 35% of welfare recipients and only 12.8% of the US population. According to the United States Census, "In 2019, the share of blacks in poverty was 1.8 times greater than their share among the general population. Blacks represented 13.2% of the total population in the United States, but 23.8% of the poverty population." Van Doorn states that the media repeatedly shows a relationship between lazy, black, and poor suggesting why some Americans are opposed to welfare programs.

From the 1970s onward, women became the predominant face of poverty. In a 1999 study by Franklin Gilliam that examined people's attitudes on race, gender, and the media, an eleven-minute news clip featuring one of two stories on welfare was shown to two groups of participants. Each story on welfare had a different recipient—one was a white woman and the other was a black woman. The results showed that people were extremely accurate in their recall of the race and gender of the black female welfare recipient in comparison to those who saw the story with the white female welfare recipient. This outcome confirmed that this unbalanced narrative of gender and race had become a standard cultural bias and that Americans often made implicit associations between race, gender, and poverty.

Furthermore, research conducted by Jennifer L. Monahan, Irene Shtrulis, and Sonja Givens on the transference of media images into interpersonal contexts reveal similar results. The researchers found that "Specific stereotype portrayals of African American women were hypothesized to produce stereotype-consistent judgments made of a different African American woman". Additionally, some believe that black single women on welfare are irresponsible in their reproductive decisions and may continue to have children to reap welfare benefits. However, as analyzed from the United States General Accounting office data, there is no greater likelihood of these occurrences with women on welfare.

The "welfare queen" stereotype is driven by false and racist beliefs that place the blame of the circumstances of poor black single mothers as the result of their own individual issues while bringing forward racial tropes such as their promiscuity, lack of structure and morals, and avoidance of work. With primary narratives regarding poverty being driven by the myth of the meritocracy (the ideologies that are centered in self-reliance and hard work being enough to pull oneself out of poverty), the "welfare queen" trope illustrates the result of adding racial and gender dimensions to these inaccurate claims. In addition to work ethic, family values, such as a heteronormative, working, two-parent household and having children only when married, are seen as the cultural standard. As a result, deviations from this ideal constitute a lower social value. By stereotyping single black mothers as "welfare queens," the interpersonal, structural, and institutional barriers that prevent adequate resources and opportunities for them which lead to or reinforce poverty are not addressed. The lack of accountability seen by institutions and structures within the U.S. government promotes individualistic and neoliberal ideals that put societal failures onto the individual rather than analyzing institutional barriers that might be preventing any necessary changes within the welfare system.

== Impact of the stereotype ==
The "Welfare queen" stereotype has had profound and far-reaching consequences, particularly during the 1990s and beyond. In the 1990s, partly due to widespread belief in the "welfare queen" stereotype, twenty-two American states passed laws that banned increasing welfare payments to mothers after they had more children. In order to receive additional funds after the birth of a child, women were required to prove to the state that their pregnancies were the result of contraceptive failure, rape, or incest. Between 2002 and 2016, these laws were repealed in seven states. California State Senator Holly Mitchell said at the time of the repeal of California's law, "I don't know a woman—and I don't think she exists—who would have a baby for the sole purpose of having another $130 a month."

The impact of the "Welfare queen" stereotype extended to welfare policies, affecting poor single mothers. These policies often failed to provide adequate access to contraceptives or abortions, limiting welfare benefits for women with children through family caps. This restricted women's reproductive autonomy and perpetuated the cycle of poverty. The stereotype's underlying belief that having children outside of marriage leads to reliance on welfare further marginalized black single mothers.

Champlin argues that the current welfare system punishes poor single mothers by not providing adequate access to contraceptives or abortions, if a woman does not wish to get pregnant, or having family caps that limit welfare benefits for women with children. It seems that regardless of whether a woman chooses to have children or not, her capabilities in achieving those desires are severely restricted by the policies and attitudes of the welfare system, which places the blame of poverty on the women and reinforces the cycle of poverty. Welfare benefits have been used as a tool for reproductive oppression and prevent their autonomy over their bodies. The reproductive oppression is partially rooted in the beliefs that having children outside of a marriage results in reliance on welfare and additional children that will continue the culture of poverty. These limitations on black single mothers' reproductive rights as requirements for welfare follows a theme of the social control of the poor, specifically where the reproduction of "fit" or "unfit" groups are controlled by those in power who deem minoritized groups, who do not follow a white, heteronormative ideal, as substandard and less fit to have reproductive autonomy.

This racial trope fostered resentment against black families, portraying single-parent or non-normative households as unfairly exploiting the welfare system. As a result, policies provided inadequate resources to these families, trapping them in poverty and stigmatizing them. This reduction in the welfare safety net ran contrary to the intended goal of supporting the well-being of mothers and children. Consequently, these families are stuck in a state of poverty and are further stigmatized. The reduction of their welfare safety net is rooted in the racially based vilification of the mothers and further harms the children of these families as a result, despite the original intentions of welfare policies being to assist the children.

As stated by the United States Department of Health and Human Services website, the goals of TANF (Temporary Assistance to Needy Families) program include reducing "out-of wedlock pregnancies" and encouraging "two-parent families" and self-reliance. The stereotype of the welfare queen appears to run counter to these ideals: the portrayal of a single, unemployed woman with a lack of procreative and financial responsibility and an overreliance on government benefits. As a result, some authors argue that current welfare policies are shaped by the desire to punish these "undeserving" recipients, rather than welfare's goal of supporting the wellbeing of mothers and their children. Additionally, the trope of the welfare queen also shaped other policies such as the Personal Responsibility and Work Act of 1996 by enforcing patriarchal, heteronormative ideals as the moral gold standard for tackling poverty and the "culture" of poverty and by situating black single mothers as "deviants" from the ideal mothering figure.

The stereotype of the welfare queen, along with other black tropes such as the "Jezebel", "Mammies, and "matriarchs," are reflected in the attitudes of welfare care workers, positioning of welfare clients, and the talks between them. Overall, these tropes result in negative interactions between the welfare recipients and the caseworkers. For example, some caseworkers viewed the mothers as sexually irresponsible, negligent, or entitled, leading some to talk to mothers attempting to seek welfare in a degrading or patronizing way.

Some scholars argue against the welfare requirement of having single mothers work by posing the question of why there is a greater focus on ensuring that single mothers contribute to the workforce rather than them having the time and resources to support and care for their children. Roberts and others point to one of the reasons being the devaluation of maternal work, particularly surrounding black single mothers. They explain that, due to society's perception of black single mothers as "unfit" for mothering or as deviations from the ideal maternal figure in a two-parent, heteronormative family structure, the importance of black mothering is often neglected and undervalued, resulting in separating black mothers from their children in requiring them to participate in the workforce. This reflects similar themes from slavery, where enslaved mothers were often forced to be apart from their children in order to serve their enslavers' labor needs. Additionally, in requiring mothers to work, discussions about their children and their wellbeing are lost from the focus of these conversations. Instead, they are positioned as not a priority, as compared to the productivity required from their mothers, and their wellbeing is at the expense of these work requirements for their caregivers. Roberts argues that this implies that society does not place value in the children of mothers on welfare and the potential for their growth and development. Rather, these children are seen as already lost in what society deems valuable. They are not viewed as being worthwhile to be invested in and that they will likely to grow up and perpetuate the same moral "deviance" and culture of poverty as their mothers.

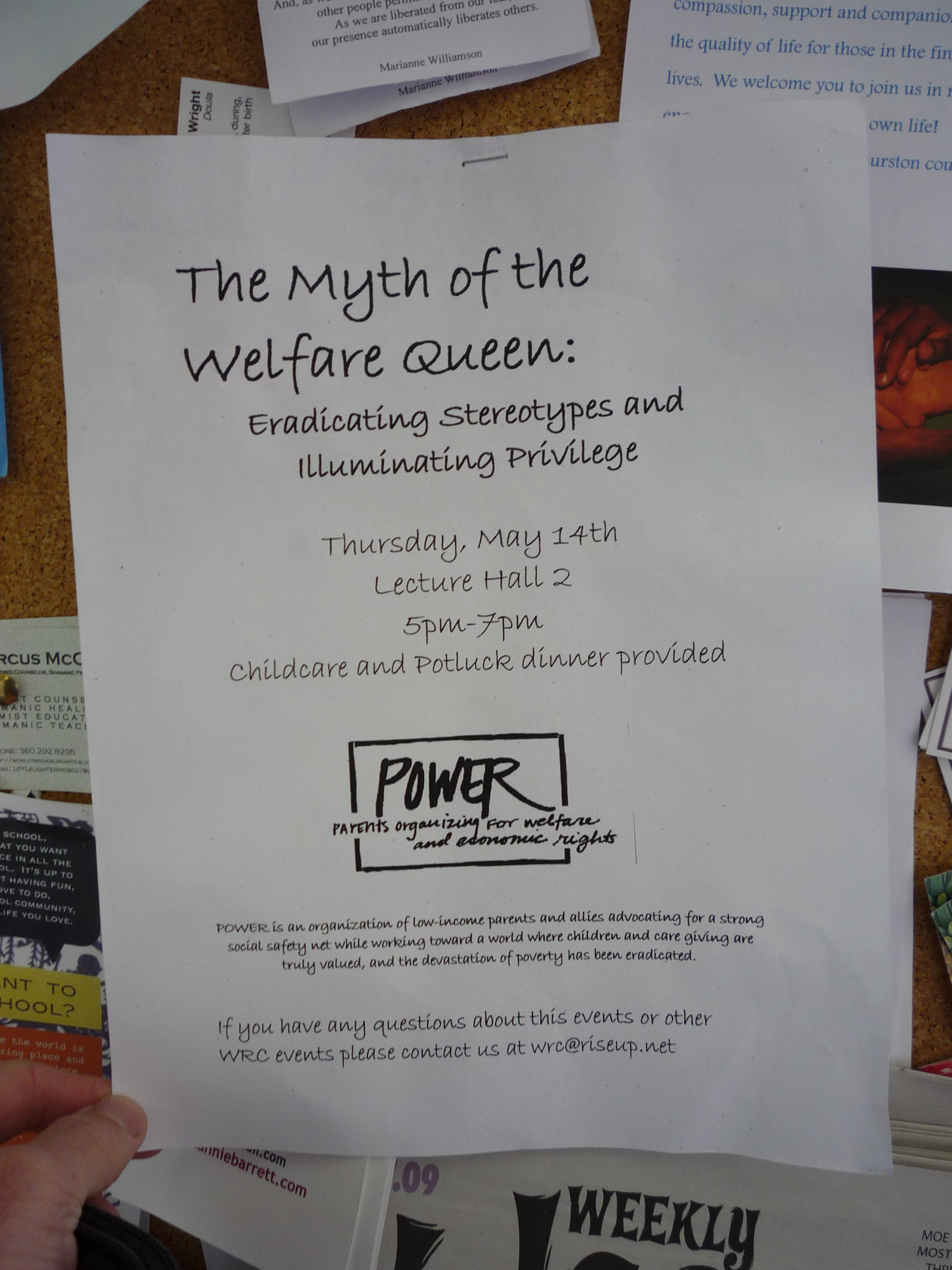
Flyer by Parents Organizing for Welfare and Economic Rights (POWER) about the Myth of the Welfare Queen

== Movements for welfare reform and destigmatization ==
In the 1960s, black- and female-led movements for adequate welfare benefits and a resistance against negative stereotypes started to be seen throughout the United States in local and community contexts. By organizing political demonstrations, creating welfare resource guides, advocating against restrictive welfare requirements (such as a disqualification for welfare benefits if there was an adult male figure in the household), and challenging the idea of a heteronormative, two-parent family structure being the gold standard for a functional and self-reliant household, these women (who referred to themselves as mothers to highlight the value of their labor at home) aimed to provide greater autonomy and reduce stigmatization for mother welfare-recipients. They also argued against the control of female reproduction through welfare, that all women should have the choice whether or not to use birth control and that welfare support should not be contingent on how "deserving" the mothers were based on their choices.

Because the welfare queen stereotype is often perpetuated through stories, research into narrative structure and transmission has offered some strategies for challenging false claims about who receives welfare and why. Social media has also emerged as a popular space for sharing welfare legends and memes, the vast majority of which depict welfare and its recipients in a negative light, relying on the welfare queen as a default stereotype. Theories from sociology, psychology, communications, and folklore studies highlight how efforts to refute these stereotypes can do the opposite by introducing false information to readers even when countering it. However, using moral reframing theory, active perspective taking, anti-legends, and counternarratives, these risks can be mitigated, and more accurate depictions of poverty and welfare can replace the stereotypes. Research in the study of legend further suggests that until the fears that underlie these stories subside, welfare queen stories will continue to be told.

Welfare recipients themselves are also working to challenge these stereotypes. Some authors have argued that the construction of the strong black woman image, one that portrays black mothers as resilient leaders of their household, stemmed from the desire of black women to resist and reject the welfare queen trope.

In a study that interviewed 60 middle- to high-income black mothers, many of the mothers expressed ways they tried to counter the stereotype of the welfare queen that may be placed on them by others. They would emphasize their educational backgrounds, mention their husbands, and dress to signal their belonging with the other white mothers to show that they did not fit the welfare queen stereotype.

One downside to this strategy is that it risks perpetuating a false distinction between the deserving and undeserving poor. Further, interviews with aid recipients revealed that the stigma of welfare and the welfare queen keeps many people from seeking help when they first need it. By the time they do apply for aid, they report being so far in debt that moving out of poverty can seem impossible.

Research has shown that the ways that welfare was constructed around race and how the residual effects of this formation have affected black women. Specifically, research as shown that people of color, specifically black people and Hispanic people, have been overrepresented in less generous social programs. This disproportion resulted in their overpopulation in welfare. This tendency, coupled with the overrepresentation of black people in media representation of people on welfare, has helped to produce the welfare queen trope. Lastly, southern states in the 1940s enforced "suitable home" laws which allowed welfare line workers to refuse to provide aid to those who infringed on sexual norms. This rule simultaneously reinforced and promoted stereotypes about black women and denied this group aid.

Scholars have conducted extensive research on the experiences of black women within the welfare system, particularly in the context of the 1996 Personal Responsibility Act. Because of the Personal Responsibility Act of 1996, work first programs began to take over welfare. Work first programs impact black women in racialized and gendered ways. These programs emphasize the need to place employment above all else in order to qualify for support. Black women are typically recommended for these programs when applying for welfare due. This can be attributed to conscious or unconscious bias by government employees who fall into the ideology about black women being less domestic and more ready for work programs. This results in black women being seen as less likely to succeed in education reform programs or longer-term training programs. Essentially, racialized ideas about black women being lazy, overly sexually active, or as having a drug or alcohol addiction can influence welfare line workers to force this group into work-first programs. Studies about this overrepresentation in welfare have led to more research into the ways that welfare can be reformed to better benefit black women.

== See also ==
- Attributions for poverty
- Dog-whistle politics
- Feminization of poverty
- Le bruit et l'odeur
- Media hype
- Stereotypes of African Americans

Welfare

- Criticisms of welfare
- Supplemental Nutrition Assistance Program
- Welfare's effect on poverty
- Welfare chauvinism
- Welfare fraud
