= Woodlawn Baptist Church and Cemetery =

Historic site in Haywood County, Tennessee, US

- U.S. National Register of Historic Places
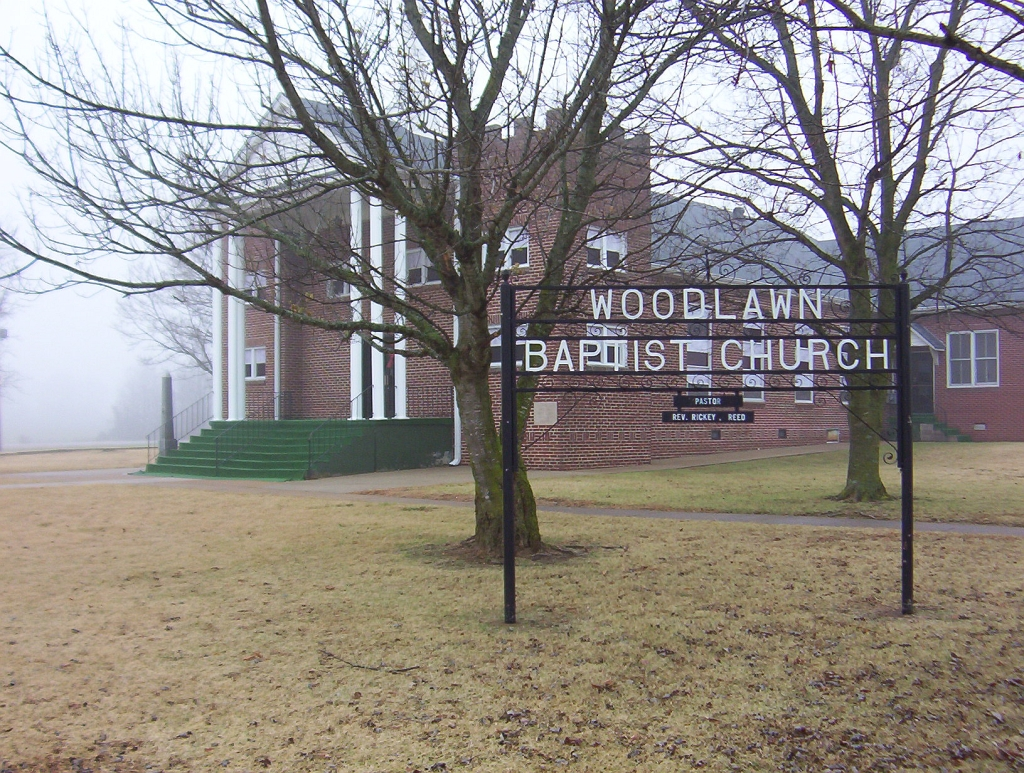

- Location within Tennessee Location within the United States
- Location: Woodlawn Rd., S of TN 19; Nutbush, Tennessee
- Coordinates: 35°39′13″N 89°21′55″W
- Built: 1927
- Architectural style: gothic & classical revival influence
- NRHP reference No.: 96001358
- Added to NRHP: December 2, 1996

Woodlawn Baptist Church and Cemetery, also known as Woodlawn Missionary Baptist Church, is a historic building in Nutbush, Haywood County, Tennessee, in the United States. It is on Woodlawn Road, south of Tennessee State Route 19.

Founded in 1866 largely by freedmen, Woodlawn Baptist Church and Cemetery was added to the National Register of Historic Places in 1966.

When singer Tina Turner was growing up as Anna Mae Bullock in Nutbush, Woodlawn Baptist was one of her family churches.

== History ==
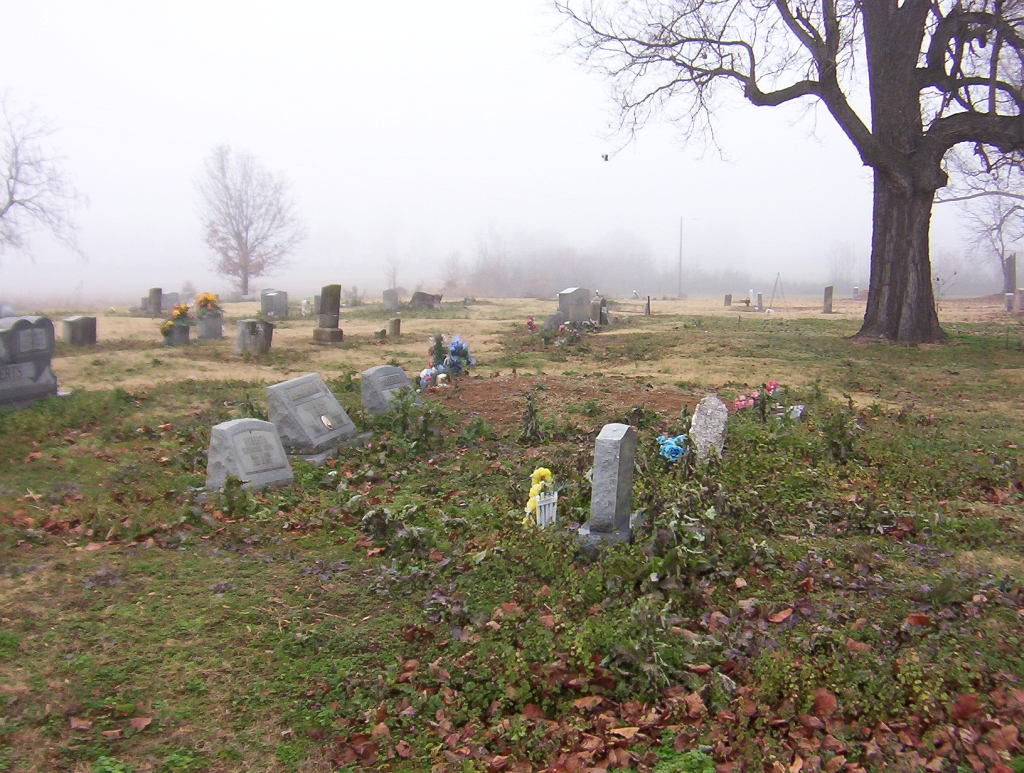
Woodlawn Baptist Church Cemetery in Nutbush (2007)

Most slave congregations were ministered by white pastors. In 1846, the young slave carpenter Hardin Smith, born in Virginia, was allowed by his master's wife to preach to a slave congregation at an evening service at the white Woodlawn Church. It was located near Woodlawn Road. He was the first slave to preach to an area congregation.

Hardin Smith was of mixed race; his white father was his mother's master Abner Smith. Hardin, his mother and siblings were sold away from Virginia. In Tennessee, he was secretly taught by his master William H. Loving's wife and children to read and write through the Bible, which was against state law at the time. He in turn secretly taught many slaves to read and write.

In 1866, after emancipation and the end of the Civil War, Hardin Smith and Martin Winfield were among three men in Haywood County selected by missionaries of the Baptist Home Mission Board for the first classes in ministry at the newly established Roger Williams College in Nashville. The Northern Baptists wanted to aid freedmen in the South and plant new churches.

After his return to Nutbush, Smith, together with other freedmen, the Freedmen's Bureau, and a few whites, founded the Woodlawn Colored Baptist Church (now known as Woodlawn Missionary Baptist Church). He was called as the pastor there and served there for the next 56 years until his death in 1929.

Smith consistently encouraged his congregation to seek education, both adults and children. In 1866 Smith and Winfield helped establish the Freedman School in the county seat of Brownsville, Tennessee. It later developed into twelve grades.

Smith was a community leader, organizing five other black Baptist churches in Haywood and nearby Lauderdale counties. Winfield helped found the First Baptist Church in Brownsville and became its pastor. All emphasized education.

These black Baptist churches soon withdrew from white supervision, as did most black Baptists in the South, establishing their own churches and associations. Smith participated in organizing the National Negro Baptist Convention. In 1895 it merged with two other groups as the National Baptist Convention USA, Inc. This formed the largest black Baptist convention in the United States.

Smith also participated in founding Howe Institute of Technology (now merged into LeMoyne-Owen College), a historically black college in Memphis and developing Roger Williams College from its beginnings in 1866. Before 1900, more students attended Roger Williams College from the Woodlawn Missionary Baptist Church than from any other community in Tennessee. Graduates from Roger Williams helped lead other black schools and colleges; they became ministers, doctors, lawyers, and teachers.

In 1996, Woodlawn Baptist Church and Cemetery was added to the National Register of Historic Places for its historical significance.

== Tina Turner Highway ==
Woodlawn Baptist Church is located 3 mi (4.8 km) southeast of Nutbush, south of Tennessee State Route 19. A stretch of State Route 19 between Brownsville and Nutbush was named "Tina Turner Highway" in 2002 after singer Tina Turner, who was born in Brownsville and lived as a child in Nutbush.

Woodlawn Baptist Church in Nutbush was a family church of Tina Turner. While growing up, she worshipped here and sang in the choir. Her family members were church officials, musicians and singers; some are buried in this cemetery.

== See also ==
- Trinity United Methodist Church (Nutbush, Tennessee)
