= Nutbush, Tennessee =

- Unincorporated community
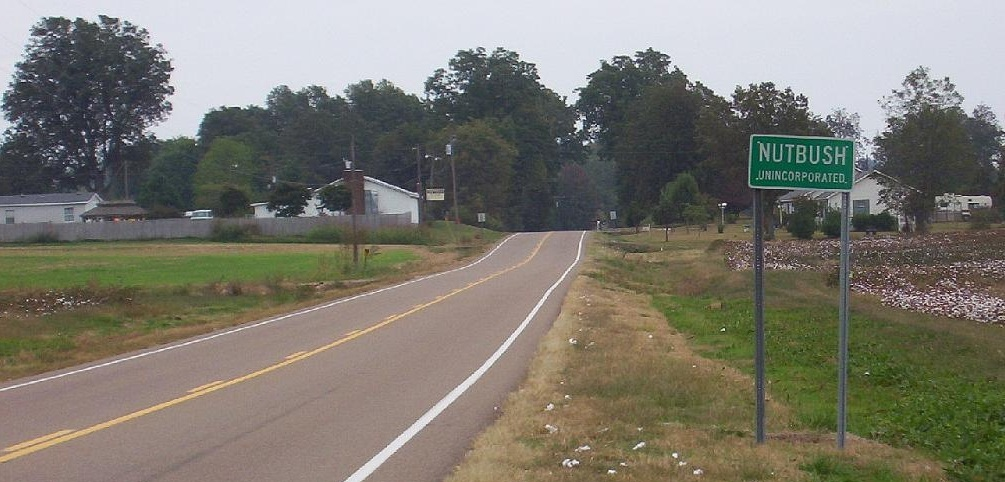
- Community sign in Nutbush

- Location in the state of Tennessee
- Coordinates: 35°41′53″N 89°24′29″W
- Country: United States
- State: Tennessee
- Counties: Haywood
- Elevation: 358 ft (109 m)

Population (2000) of the Nutbush voting precinct
  - Total: 259
- Time zone: UTC-6 (CST)
  - Summer (DST): UTC-5 (CDT)
- ZIP code: 38063 (Ripley)
- Area code: 731

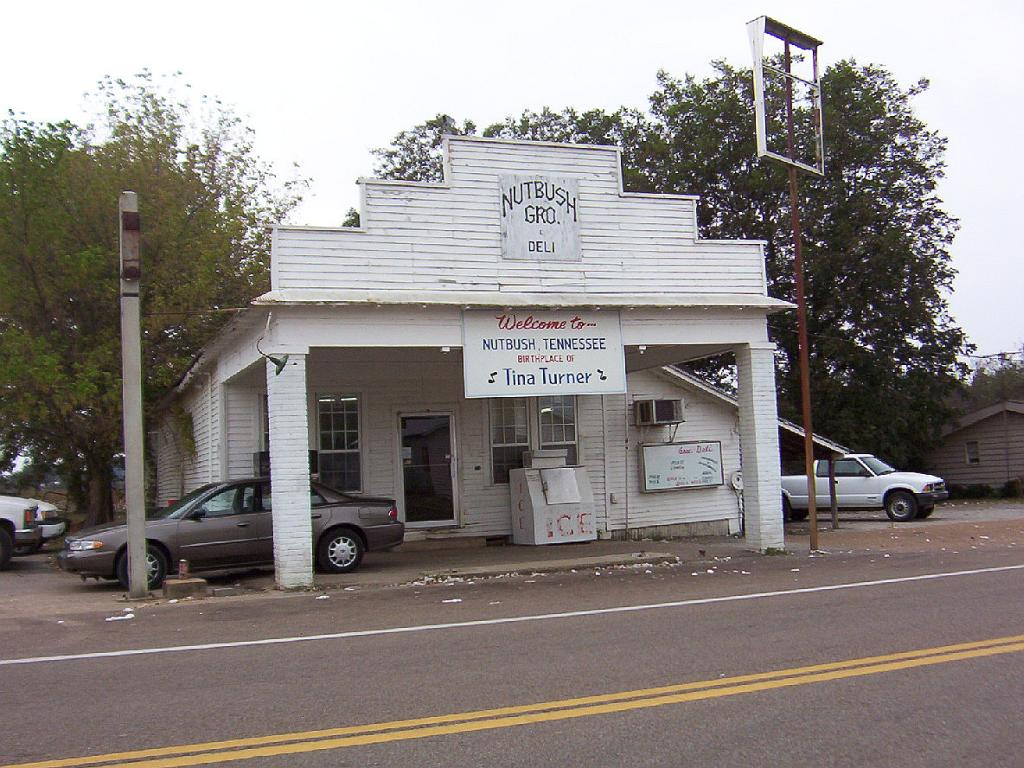
Nutbush grocery store (2004)

Nutbush is a rural unincorporated community in Haywood County, Tennessee, United States, in the western part of the state, approximately 50 miles (80 km) north-east of Memphis. It was established in the early 19th century by European-American settlers, who bought enslaved African Americans to develop the area's cotton plantations. Houses and churches built during that time still stand.

Agriculture is still the most important element of the rural economy, focused on the cultivation and processing of cotton, which has been the main commodity crop since the antebellum years, when its cultivation depended on slave labor. As of 2006, there was one cotton-processing plant in the community.

Nutbush is the childhood home of singer Tina Turner, who described the town in her 1973 song "Nutbush City Limits". In 2002, a segment of Tennessee State Route 19 near Nutbush was named "Tina Turner Highway" in her honor. It is also the home town of pioneer blues musicians and recording artists Hambone Willie Newbern and Sleepy John Estes.

== Demographics ==
In 2000, the population of the Nutbush voting precinct (TN 3976) was 259. Of those, 42 were white (16.22%), 215 black (82.01%), and two were of another ethnicity (0.77%). At that time, 190 people (73.36%) were aged 18 or older.

== Economy ==
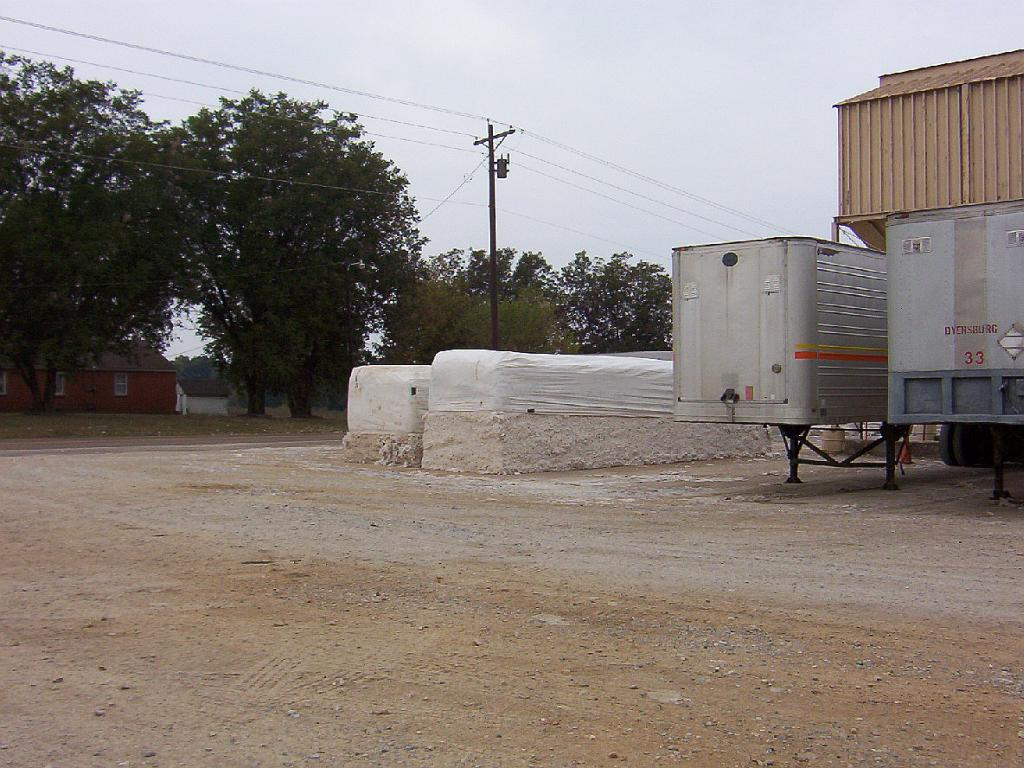
Cotton processing in Nutbush (2004)

The community's main source of income is agriculture (especially cotton).

After the abolition of slavery, freedmen worked at sharecropping as the primary means of income. They cultivated plots of land, mostly for growing cotton, in return for paying a share of the crop to the landowner.

Modern machines such as the cotton picker superseded manual cultivation. Many farm workers left the area for cities during the Great Migration of the early 20th century. As of 2006, one cotton-processing plant in Nutbush is the only agricultural industry in the community.

Lagoon Creek Peaking Facility is run by the Tennessee Valley Authority (TVA) in Nutbush. Eight gas turbines generate electric power for the area in times of high demand.

== History ==
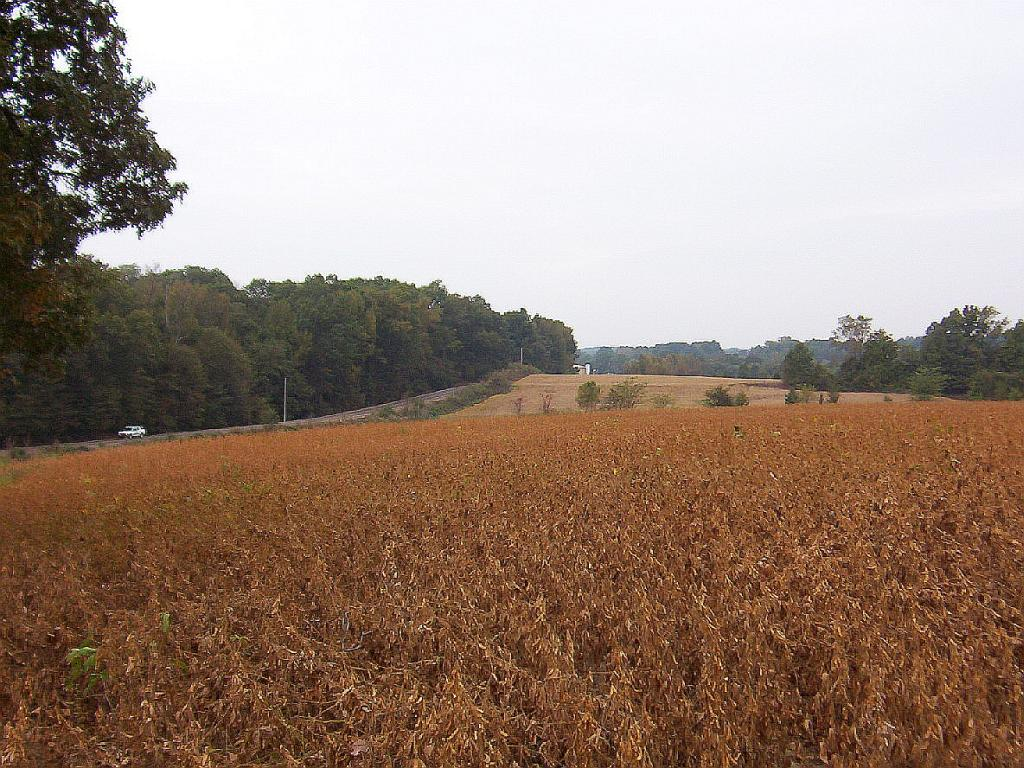
Scenic view onto Tennessee State Route 19 (2004)

The Nutbush community was established in the early 19th century by settlers from Virginia and North Carolina. Descended from immigrants from England, they traveled westward to the Mississippi River delta in western Tennessee. They developed this area for cotton and were dependent on the use of slave labor.

These settlers founded Trinity United Methodist Church in 1822. During the slavery years, black enslaved people were forced to attend the church under white supervision.

During and after the Civil War, more than 50 Civil War soldiers, both Confederate and Unionist, were buried in the Trinity Cemetery associated with the church. The Trinity Cemetery is mentioned on the Rootsweb Internet site as one of the best-kept cemeteries in the county.

The community also had Woodlawn Church, which was limited to whites and is still active. Under antebellum state law, most black congregations had to be ministered by white pastors. In 1846, Hardin Smith, who was from Virginia, was allowed to preach to a black congregation at an evening service at the white Woodlawn Church, the first time a congregation in the area was pastored by an enslaved person.

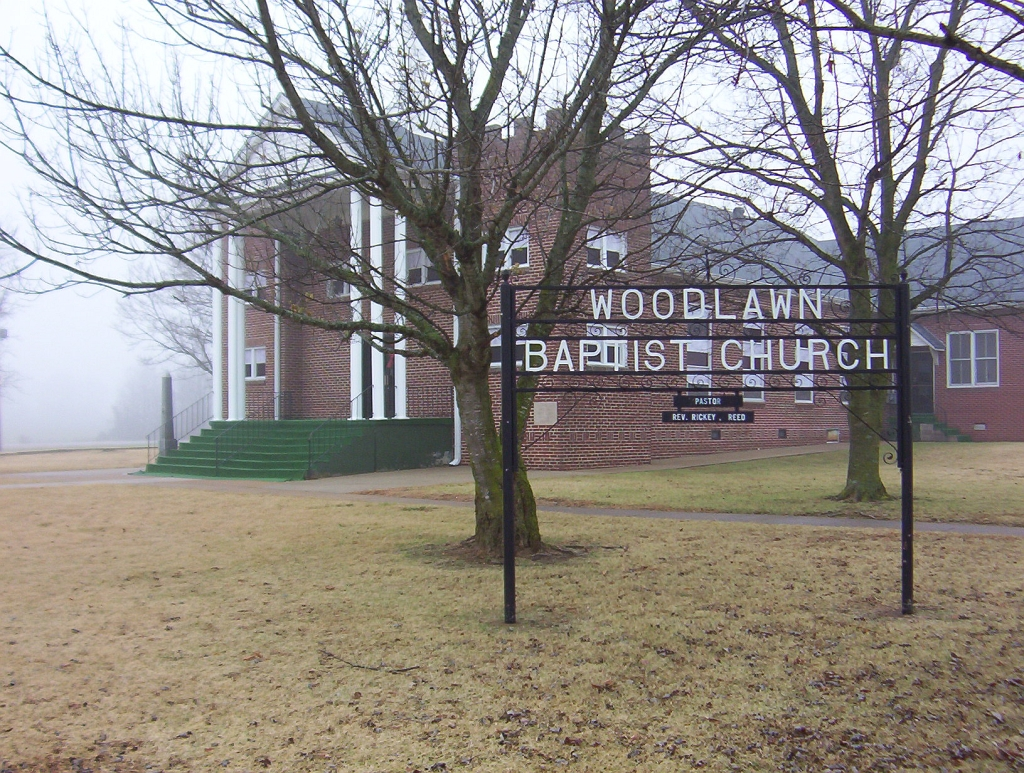
Woodlawn Baptist Church (2007)

After the American Civil War, the Woodlawn Missionary Baptist Church was established in 1866 by Hardin Smith and other freedmen of the community, aided by some members of the white Woodlawn Baptist Church. The freedmen soon withdrew their congregation from white supervision, as did most black Baptists in the South. They had established their own regional and national associations by the end of the century.

Woodlawn Baptist Church was added to the National Register of Historic Places in 1996 for its historical significance.

In 1881, a U.S. Post office was opened in Nutbush, but was closed in 1905.

== Geography ==
Nutbush is located at 35°41′53″N 89°24′29″W (35.6981330, -89.4081280), at an elevation of 358 feet (109 m).

Cotton fields and hills dominate the landscape of the surrounding area. Nutbush is situated on the south-eastern edge of the New Madrid Seismic Zone, an area with a high earthquake risk.

=== Postal and telephone ===
The U.S. ZIP Code for Nutbush is 38063 (Ripley) and the telephone area code is 731.

== Notable people ==
The early Black musicians and singers from the Nutbush churches recorded and influenced an international audience. Prominent recording artists include Hambone Willie Newbern and Sleepy John Estes. Harmonica player Noah Lewis of Henning, Tennessee, is buried in an area cemetery near Nutbush.

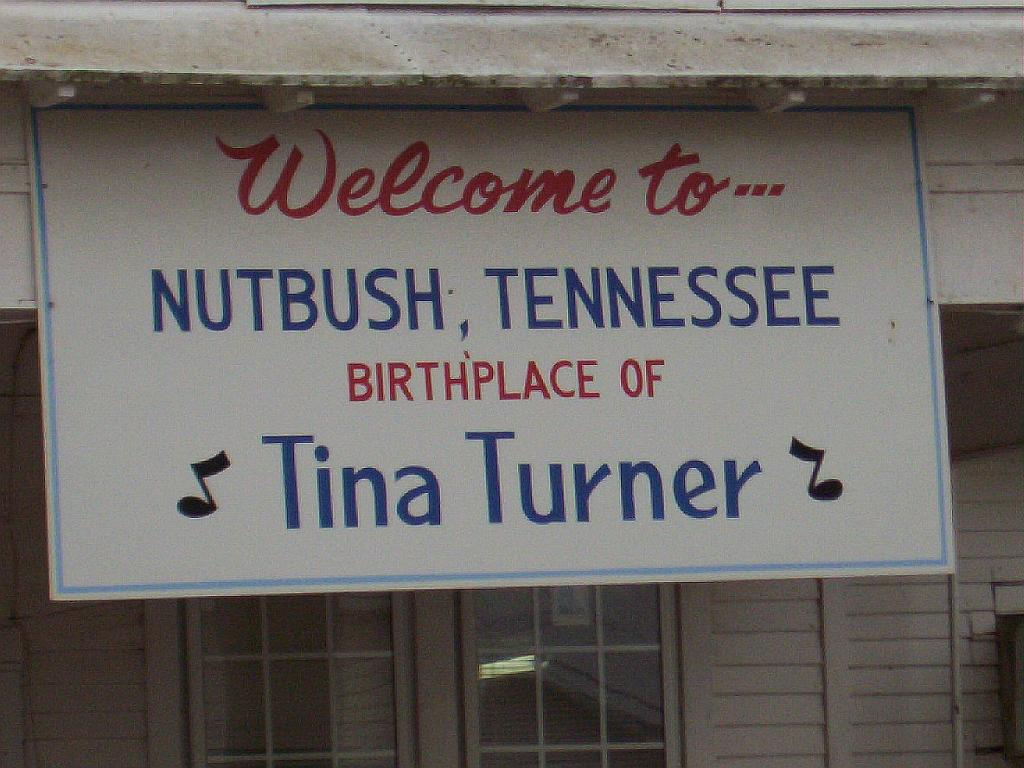
Nutbush is the childhood home of singer Tina Turner. (2006)

Nutbush is best known as the childhood home of singer Tina Turner, then known as Anna Mae Bullock. Bullock was born in nearby Brownsville on November 26, 1939. She was raised in Nutbush, Knoxville, and Ripley by her maternal grandmother and extended family in the area. The houses she lived in as a child no longer exist, but wood from her Nutbush/Flagg Grove home was used to build a barn. At age 16, she moved to St. Louis, Missouri.

Both Woodlawn Missionary Baptist Church and Spring Hill Baptist Church in Nutbush were family churches of Tina Turner. Growing up, she attended and sang in both choirs. Her family members were church officials, musicians and singers, and various members are buried in the two cemeteries.

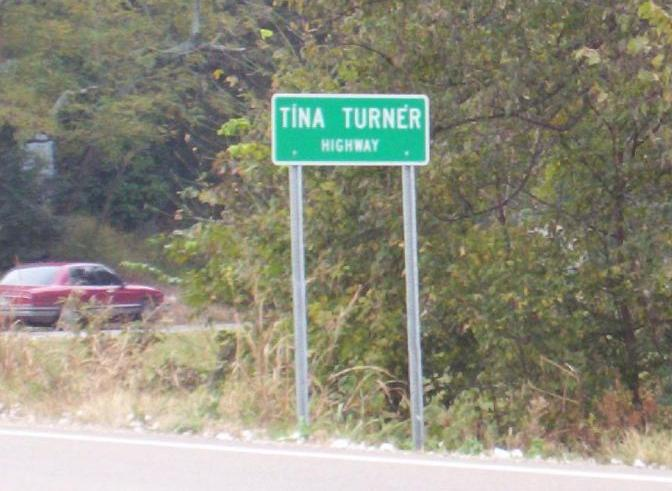
Tina Turner Highway in Nutbush (2004)

In 2002, Tennessee State Route 19 between Brownsville and Nutbush was officially designated as "Tina Turner Highway" in her honor.

== Cultural influence ==
- Tina Turner's song "Nutbush City Limits" (1973, produced by Ike Turner) is about her hometown. The line dance "The Nutbush" is performed to the song, which is featured in "Diva", an episode in the fourth season of Glee.
