= Noah Lewis (musician) =

American musician (1891–1961)

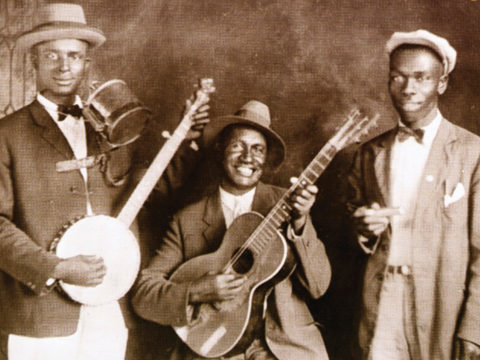
Cannon's Jug Stompers, with Lewis on the right

Noah Lewis (September 3, 1891 – February 7, 1961) was an American jug band and country blues musician, generally known for playing the harmonica.

== Life and career ==
Lewis was born in Henning, Tennessee, and learned to play the harmonica as a child. He moved to Memphis, Tennessee, in his early teens, where he met Gus Cannon near Ripley in 1910. By that time he was already a respected original stylist on the harmonica, noted for his liquid tone and breath control, which allowed him to generate enormous volume from the instrument. By then he was also noted for his ability to play two harmonicas at once – one with his mouth and one with his nose, a trick he probably taught to Big Walter Horton, who recorded briefly as a teenager with the Memphis Jug Band some 20 years later. Lewis' ability to generate volume led to him playing in string bands and brass marching bands around Henning and on the streets of Memphis.

At their meeting in 1907, Lewis introduced Cannon to the 13-year-old guitarist and singer Ashley Thompson, with whom Lewis had been playing in the streets of Ripley and Memphis for some time, and the three of them worked together over the next 20 years whenever Cannon was in Memphis and not away working medicine and tent shows. When Will Shade's Memphis Jugband recorded and became popular in the late 1920s, Cannon added a coal-oil can on a rack round his neck and renamed the trio (Cannon, Lewis and Thompson) Cannon's Jug Stompers. It was this lineup that made the Jug Busters' first recordings, for Victor Records, in Memphis on January 30, 1928. The songs from that session included "Minglewood Blues", "Springdale Blues", "Big Railroad Blues" and "Madison Street Rag". By the time of the band's next recording, on September 5, 1928, Cannon had replaced Thompson with Elijah Avery on banjo and guitar. By the time of the band's third recording session, four days later, Avery had in turn been replaced by an old friend of Cannon's from the medicine and tent show circuit, the six-string banjo player and guitarist Hosea Woods. The band's lineup remained unchanged from then on. With the Jug Stompers, Lewis sang lead vocals and played a melancholy harmonica solo on "Viola Lee Blues".

Lewis recorded four solo tracks and another four sides with the Noah Lewis Jug Band, consisting of Lewis, Sleepy John Estes (guitar) and Yank Rachell (mandolin), in 1930.

His songs "New, New Minglewood Blues", "Viola Lee Blues", and "Big Railroad Blues" were in the repertoire of the Grateful Dead.

== Death ==
Lewis died in poverty, of gangrene brought on by frostbite, in Ripley, Tennessee, in 1961. He is buried in the Moorer (aka Marrows) Cemetery, five miles southwest of his birthplace, Henning.
