= Welfare fraud =

Form of illegally using state welfare systems

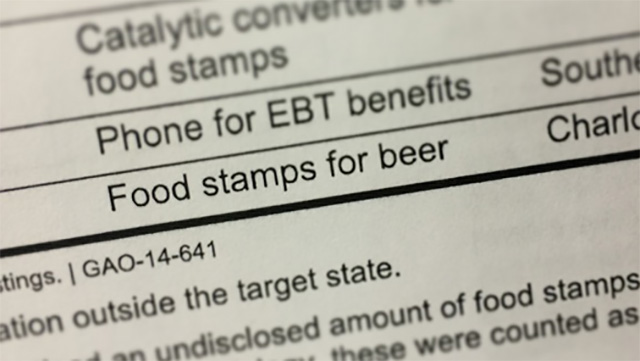
Excerpt from a report on welfare fraud (Supplemental Nutrition Assistance Program, August 2014) by the US Government Accountability Office

Welfare fraud is the act of illegally using state welfare systems by knowingly withholding or giving information to obtain more funds than would otherwise be allocated.

This article deals with welfare fraud in various countries of the world, and includes many social benefit programs such as food assistance, public housing, unemployment benefits, disability benefits, and public medical insurance. Each country's problems and programs are varied. Obtaining reliable evidence of welfare fraud is notoriously difficult. Apart from the obvious methodological problems, research reveals that interviewing performance is often mediocre, and may be anecdotal, misunderstood, or collected from opinionated or biased caseworkers. Interviews with non-citizen welfare recipients, where the interviewer has succeeded in gaining a high level of trust, have shown that a very high percent fail to report incomes. Official figures of the prevalence of welfare fraud based on government investigation tend to be low – a few percent of the total amount of welfare spending. Statistical research indicates that the vast majority of fraud is committed by businesses serving the recipients of government benefits. Welfare or benefits fraud committed by recipients is usually of very modest sums, and is committed by people who struggle with poverty; but once started it often continues after reaching financial stability.

== Welfare fraud in various countries ==
=== Austria ===
Welfare fraud has been estimated to over 1.1 billion Euros, or 1.32% of total expenditures for social benefits between 2011 and 2013. 25% of welfare fraud is committed by foreigners, who make up 12.5% of the population.

=== Canada ===
In Canada, about 3.5% of total employment insurance expenditure was attributable to fraud and error in 2003. The total fraud and error rate in welfare allowances was estimated in 1994 to be 3-5%. In 2004–5, entitlement reviews designed to prevent fraud reported savings of CA$800 million in 2004–05.

=== Denmark ===
A day off qualifying period before sickness benefit may be claimed was introduced in 1985. It was abolished two years later when it turned out that employees instead reported themselves sick for more than one day.

=== France ===
In France, the Caisse d'allocations familiales reported in 1994 an estimated amount to 2,000 to 3,000 fraud cases per year, which was considered low. When asked whether they would take a black market job while receiving unemployments benefits, more than 85% answered yes if the risk of audit was 1/6, close to 50% if the risk was 1/4, and 6% if the risk was 1/2.

=== Germany ===
Logo for Bundesagentur für Arbeit, which manages unemployment benefits in Germany

In 2015, 978,809 sanctions were imposed on people who received unemployment benefits. 75% were moderate sanctions for failure to report information. At least one sanction was imposed on 131,520 beneficiaries, or 3% of total.

The German government has estimated that the amounts lost through welfare fraud were 6% of the amounts lost through tax evasion and subsidy fraud.

German authorities assume that welfare fraud by relatively well-off people of Turkish origin is common, although there is no statistics concerning its scope. It is easy to register as indigent in Germany, although one may have financial assets in Turkey. In Braunschweig asylum seekers were able to defraud the government of 3 to 5 million euros in some 300 cases by creating multiple identities.

A criminal network engaging in welfare fraud was revealed in 2016. It is suspected to have been led by a parliamentarian who provided Bulgarians and Romanians with false work contracts and collected millions of Euros.

=== Ireland ===
Informal briefing reports from the Department of Social Protection in Ireland revealed that reports of welfare frauds increased by 2500% between 2008 and 2013. The Irish Examiner earlier noticed, "gone are the days when this crime – and that's the correct term – was greeted with knowing nods, winks and grudging admiration for certain people who knew the system inside out and 'could get away with it."

=== Israel ===
Social Security estimates that fraud or error accounts for 5% of its budget annually. In 2005, the head of the agency estimated that 7,000 of the 150,000 income maintenance recipients succeed in defrauding the system every year. In a 2013 study, 34 of 49 welfare recipients unequivocally admitted to fraud.

A Channel 10 report contended that thousands of haredim who nominally study Torah full-time are in essence working illegally. When their reporter Dov Gilhar advertised in Bnei Brak for workers for a fictitious company, it turned out that most applicants intended to exploit the benefits they receive as yeshiva students, although they would work. Nine out of ten "candidates" who were filmed by the hidden cameras exhibited extensive knowledge of defrauding the system. Several haredi yeshivas have been engaging in fraud by enrolling fictitious students in order to receive the living stipends for full-time Torah students. Hundreds of fake students were reported, and millions of shekels received. A report from the Education Ministry and the accountant general of the Finance Ministry concluded that the number of 120,000 yeshiva students claimed by the haredi schools was exaggerated by five to ten thousand.

=== Netherlands ===
In the Netherlands, surveys on fraudulent behavior in disability and old age benefits among others are undertaken. They show that between 10 and 20% of claimants show some form of fraudulent behavior. Large-scale survey research indicates that welfare fraud is more common in the Netherlands than in Britain or America. One study revealed a 17% participation in the black economy by welfare benefit recipients, while another found a 28% participation rate. The vast majority of these earned less than 1,500 guilders ($700) a year from this activity.

=== Norway ===
In 2011, the Norwegian Labour and Welfare Administration had over 100 Somali women who had divorced their husbands to claim extra income support as the sole provider for the family, then had more children to their ex-husbands. Each family had defrauded state agencies out of an average 80 thousand euro. On average, sole providers receive 1,500 euro monthly per child. The welfare system is based on trust.

=== Sweden ===
The Swedish National Audit Office estimated the annual losses due to fraud or error to be from 5.3 billion kronor ($793 million) to 7.4 billion ($1.1 billion) in 1995. In 2007, the Delegation Against Incorrect Payments estimated that 20 billion crowns ($2.2 billion) were being overpaid due to fraud or error, fraud comprising half of the sum. It was found that 4-6% of unemployment benefits were being paid to people who were in fact working but did not report their work.

Linked processing of the data for housing allowances and for sickness insurance has taken place in Sweden since 1979. This has created, in the words of Eckart Kuhlborn, "a crime prevention eldorado" by making it possible to identify households which have reported different incomes. A check of 70% of the households that received both kinds of payments showed that 2.7% had given false information about their incomes. The next year, the figure had decreased to 1.2%, possibly due to more widespread understanding of the risk of being caught.

Logo for the Swedish Social Insurance Inspectorate, which supervises the Swedish social insurance system

According to Statistics Sweden, 40,000 foreigners are registered in Sweden but no longer live there. They can continue to receive benefits, although they live abroad. When the authorities in Tensta decided that benefit recipients have to turn up at the welfare office in order to receive their money, one third did not turn up.

=== United Kingdom ===
The United Kingdom Department for Work and Pensions (DWP) defines benefit fraud as when someone obtains state benefit without being entitled to or deliberately failing to report a change in personal circumstances. The DWP claim that fraudulent benefit claims amounted to around £900 million in 2008–09.

A UK State of the Nation report published in 2010 estimated the total benefit fraud in the United Kingdom in 2009–10 to be approximately £1 billion. Figures from the Department for Work and Pensions show that benefit fraud is thought to have cost taxpayers £1.2 billion during 2012–13, up 9% from the year before. The DWP estimated that 3.2% of benefit expenditure in Great Britain, or £9.9 billion, was overpaid through fraud and error in the financial year ending 2026. Fraud alone accounted for an overpayment rate of 2.2%. These figures are estimates based on reviews of a sample of claims. The DWP classes an overpayment as fraud where fraud is evidenced or fraudulent intent is suspected. A poll conducted by the Trades Union Congress in 2012 found that perceptions among the British public were that benefit fraud was high. On average, people thought that 27% of the British welfare budget was claimed fraudulently, but official UK government figures have stated that the proportion of fraud stood at 0.7% of the total welfare budget in 2011–12. In 2006–07, DWP estimated that it spent £154 million on fraud investigation, yet only recovered £22 million.

Criminologist Martin James Tunley argues that disability benefits are easier to illegally obtain than other benefits, and may be targeted by systematic fraudsters motivated by greed. Although the Benefit Integrity Project concluded that disability benefit fraud was "minimal," the 1997 disability benefits review found that 12.2% of claims were fraudulent.

=== United States ===
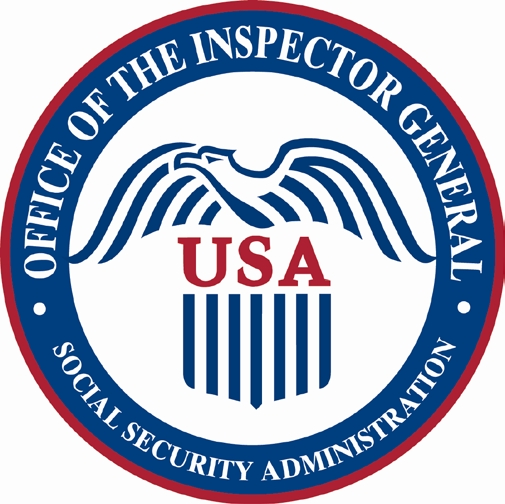
Seal of the Social Security Administration Office of Inspector General, which investigates welfare fraud

Welfare fraud, which may include state or federal benefits, is low in incident numbers but widespread geographically, much of it committed by persons other than the benefit recipients; some of it stolen from them or collected after their death by others not entitled to it. Incidents of government program workers stealing or diverting benefits were prosecuted.

In 2016, the Office of Investigations for the Social Security Administration received 143,385 allegations and opened 8,048 cases. Of those cases, about 1,162 persons were convicted for crime. Recoveries amounted to $52.6 million, fines to $4.5 million, settlements/judgements to $1.7 million and restitution to $70 million. The estimated savings were $355.7 million.

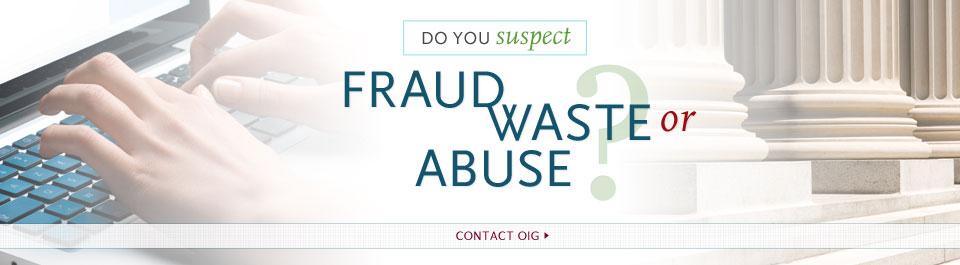
An appeal from the Office of Inspector General to contact them if one suspects fraud, waste or abuse

In the first half of the fiscal year 2012, the office of the Inspector General of the Social Security Administration was able to detect frauds that cost the government over $253 million.

==== Water dumping ====
One form of welfare fraud called "water dumping" (also called "container dumping") is using food stamps to purchase bottled water bearing bottle deposit for the purpose of emptying them out to redeem the bottles for cash. This practice has been included into the definition of benefits trafficking in 2013. The purpose includes the purchase of items ineligible for purchase with benefits, such as beer. Food stamps is a significant welfare program which has been around in the US since 1964.

== Combating fraud ==
The costs of policing and prosecuting welfare fraud are high, though largely unmeasured. They may include labor costs of investigators, prosecutors, public defenders, judges, and probation officers, administrative costs for welfare diversion programs, prison costs, and costs for placing children in foster care if the sole parent serves time for welfare fraud. In 2008, California spent three times as much in policing welfare fraud as the amount the fraud cost. The US Federal government has recouped hundreds of millions from fraudsters and other misappropriations of funds from the Social Security Administration alone. This represents all types of fraud, not just recipient fraud. In many cases, the recipients were victims of stolen benefits.

Investigation and prosecution of fraud was intensified in Britain in the late 1970s. A peak was reached in 1980–81, when 20,105 people were prosecuted for welfare fraud. The Rayner commission recommended a more cost-effective approach involving non-prosecution interviews. Special Claims Control Units conducted "blitzes" in target areas and persuaded claimants to withdraw their claims, thereby avoiding expensive prosecutions. In the 1990s, advertising campaigns and "Shop a Cheat" hotlines were introduced. The campaigns led to increases in tip-offs and successful prosecutions, but there is no evidence of a lasting impact on benefit fraud loss.

== Attitudes to welfare fraud ==
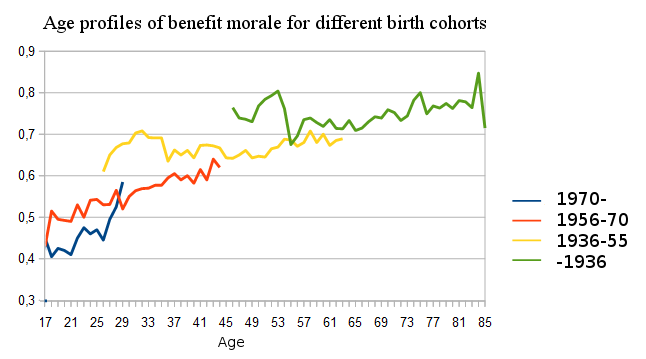
Age profile of benefit morale for different birth cohorts. Respondent's mean share of answer "claiming government benefits to which you are not entitled is never justifiable".

59% of Australians said that welfare fraud is seriously wrong, while 38% think it is "wrong" but not seriously. Welfare fraud was condemned as being harsher than tax evasion, which may be partly due to the view of welfare as rehabilitation – a way of providing a temporary helping hand to help people who have had hard luck getting back on their feet – so that fraud provides prima facie proof evidence that welfare is not working.

Data from the World Value Survey indicates that the acceptance of illegal benefit claims has increased in most industrial countries. This shift has been most marked in Sweden, where the share of respondents answering that claiming government benefits to which one is not entitled is always wrong has dropped from 81.5% to 55.3% from the early 1980s to the early 2000s. The data from 2005 to 2008, however, showed an increase to 61.0%. Attitudes vary greatly according to age, with younger people being much more inclined to accept welfare fraud.

Welfare fraud often reflects an idea that people have a moral right to proper financial support from the government. An Israeli study showed that 47 of 49 women on welfare openly and actively justified acts of welfare fraud, including eight persons who did not admit to committing fraud themselves. They based their claim on recipient's social contribution through motherhood, their past and present efforts to participate in the paid labor market, or their past military service. By contrast, an American study showed great assent to the rules of the welfare system by welfare recipients, even as they found it impossible to comply with the rules.

== Explanations ==
=== Poverty ===
Most who commit welfare fraud or benefits fraud, are businesses; persons who are not the beneficiary; or recipients who live under precarious circumstances and feel that they do not have much of a choice. Some belong to the new underclass – marked by low social status, limited education and inadequate qualifications – and do not easily find employment and are receptive to opportunities offered by their social network, which may include the "informal economy." The inflexibility of the system makes reporting short works unprofitable or inconvenient, which undermines some welfare recipient's belief in the legitimacy of the system. Many fraudsters find the type of jobs available to them incompatible with their responsibilities as caretakers. There are also studies which indicate that a majority of fraudsters are not motivated primarily by severe economic problems. Data from the World Values Surveys show that higher rates of unemployment tend to lead to lower levels of benefit morale in the population, as more people are familiar with the situation of being a benefit recipient and know the cost of dispensing with it.

=== Norms ===
Attitudes to welfare fraud in Sweden
1981–84	81.5
1989–93	74.5
1994–99	57.9
1999–04	55.3
2005–08	61
Percentage agreeing that "claiming government benefits to which you are not entitled is never justified".

There is also a clear correlation between increased social spending and deteriorating benefit morale, a phenomenon predicted by economist Assar Lindbeck. The size of the welfare state does not correlate with low benefit morale, since a high benefit morale is a precondition for viable welfare states; it is the growth of the welfare state that predicts deteriorating benefit morale. The Swedish example illustrates this with declining benefit morale accompanying the development of a generous welfare state, and a break in the trend following the roll-back of the state since the 1990s. Detrimental effects of the welfare state are consistent with the large cohort differences in benefit morale.

Differential association and social disorganisation leads to subgroups holding deviant value systems, which may include tolerance of, and even expectations of, welfare fraud. Although there is evidence for a prevalent fraud culture influencing social cohesion in some neighborhoods, this is a politically sensitive issue. The Department for Work and Pensions in the UK has a policy of refraining from routinely identifying cultural clusters where welfare fraud is likely to be most prevalent.

=== Deterrence ===
Deterrence is ineffective. Many assess the risk of being caught as minimal, and it has been suggested that a widespread lack of understanding and underprediction of the sanctions for breaking the rules may contribute to this. A study of how people would do in hypothetic situations showed large differences between various risk alternatives. More than 80% were ready to take a job on the black market and receive unemployment benefit if the risk of audit was 1/6, but just under 50% if the risk was 1/4 and circa 5% if the risk was 1/2. In an Israeli study of welfare recipients, all interviewees personally knew people who had been caught, and most had been subject to investigations and surveillance, yet they stated clearly that the risk of facing punishment (including criminal charges) did not affect their behavior.

== See also ==
- Criticisms of welfare
- Medicare fraud
