= Ripley, Tennessee =

- City
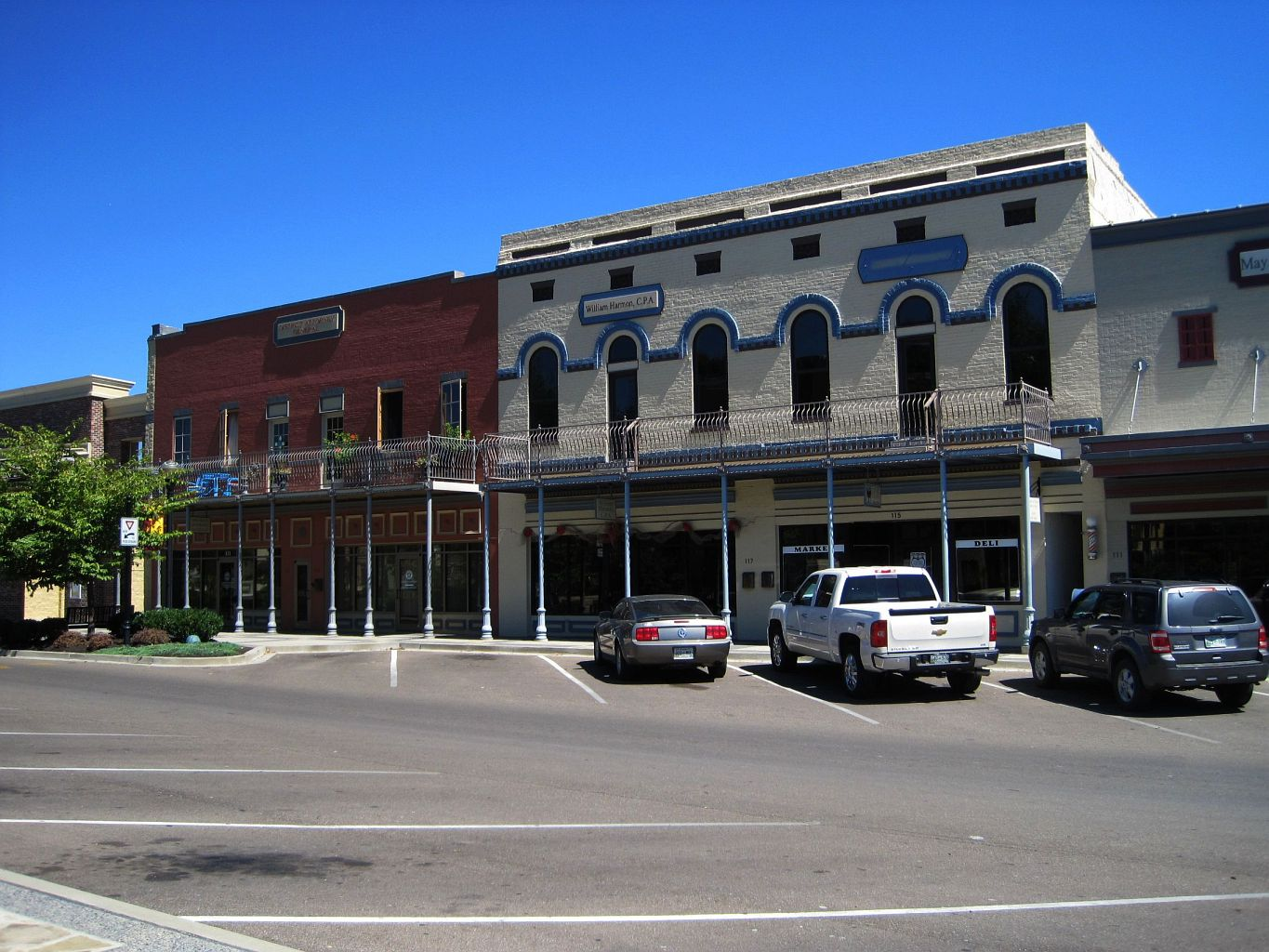
- City Square in Ripley, September 2013

- Flag Logo
- Nicknames: The Rip, Rip-Town, Lil' Memphis
- Motto: "Come see what's growing on"
- Location of Ripley in Lauderdale County, Tennessee.
- Coordinates: 35°44′35″N 89°32′2″W
- Country: United States
- State: Tennessee
- County: Lauderdale
- Founded: 1836
- Incorporated: 1838
- Named for: Eleazer Ripley

Area
  - Total: 12.91 sq mi (33.43 km^{2})
  - Land: 12.87 sq mi (33.33 km^{2})
  - Water: 0.039 sq mi (0.10 km^{2})
- Elevation: 446 ft (136 m)

Population (2020)
  - Total: 7,800
  - Density: 606.0/sq mi (233.99/km^{2})
- Time zone: UTC-6 (Central (CST))
  - Summer (DST): UTC-5 (CDT)
- ZIP code: 38063
- Area code: 731
- FIPS code: 47-63340
- GNIS feature ID: 1299470
- Website: www.cityofripleytn.com

Ripley is a city in Lauderdale County, Tennessee, United States. As of the 2020 census, Ripley had a population of 7,800. It is the county seat of Lauderdale County.

== Geography ==
Ripley is located at 35°44′35″N 89°32′2″W (35.743115, −89.533872).

According to the United States Census Bureau, the city has a total area of 12.9 square miles (33 km^{2}), of which 12.8 square miles (33 km^{2}) is land and 0.04 square miles (0.10 km^{2}) (0.31%) is water.

Ripley is located on the southeastern edge of the New Madrid Seismic Zone, an area with a high earthquake risk.

=== Climate ===
Climate data for Ripley, Tennessee (1991–2020 normals, extremes 1962–2017)
Month	Jan	Feb	Mar	Apr	May	Jun	Jul	Aug	Sep	Oct	Nov	Dec	Year
Record high °F (°C)	77 (25)	80 (27)	86 (30)	93 (34)	96 (36)	100 (38)	105 (41)	103 (39)	100 (38)	93 (34)	86 (30)	79 (26)	105 (41)
Mean maximum °F (°C)	67.5 (19.7)	72.4 (22.4)	78.8 (26.0)	85.5 (29.7)	89.8 (32.1)	95.0 (35.0)	97.1 (36.2)	96.8 (36.0)	93.0 (33.9)	86.0 (30.0)	77.9 (25.5)	67.4 (19.7)	98.1 (36.7)
Mean daily maximum °F (°C)	47.7 (8.7)	53.0 (11.7)	61.1 (16.2)	71.6 (22.0)	79.9 (26.6)	87.0 (30.6)	89.8 (32.1)	88.8 (31.6)	83.4 (28.6)	73.4 (23.0)	60.1 (15.6)	51.0 (10.6)	70.6 (21.4)
Daily mean °F (°C)	38.5 (3.6)	43.1 (6.2)	50.6 (10.3)	60.5 (15.8)	69.3 (20.7)	76.8 (24.9)	79.8 (26.6)	78.3 (25.7)	72.2 (22.3)	61.4 (16.3)	49.9 (9.9)	41.6 (5.3)	60.2 (15.6)
Mean daily minimum °F (°C)	29.4 (−1.4)	33.2 (0.7)	40.2 (4.6)	49.4 (9.7)	58.7 (14.8)	66.7 (19.3)	69.8 (21.0)	67.9 (19.9)	61.0 (16.1)	49.5 (9.7)	39.8 (4.3)	32.3 (0.2)	49.8 (9.9)
Mean minimum °F (°C)	10.7 (−11.8)	15.0 (−9.4)	24.3 (−4.3)	33.8 (1.0)	45.8 (7.7)	54.9 (12.7)	62.3 (16.8)	58.7 (14.8)	45.5 (7.5)	34.5 (1.4)	24.7 (−4.1)	14.5 (−9.7)	5.6 (−14.7)
Record low °F (°C)	−10 (−23)	1 (−17)	7 (−14)	28 (−2)	33 (1)	43 (6)	49 (9)	50 (10)	33 (1)	25 (−4)	11 (−12)	−8 (−22)	−10 (−23)
Average precipitation inches (mm)	4.15 (105)	4.80 (122)	5.10 (130)	5.11 (130)	7.20 (183)	4.94 (125)	4.52 (115)	3.61 (92)	3.50 (89)	4.06 (103)	4.57 (116)	5.28 (134)	56.84 (1,444)
Average snowfall inches (cm)	0.9 (2.3)	0.4 (1.0)	1.1 (2.8)	0.0 (0.0)	0.0 (0.0)	0.0 (0.0)	0.0 (0.0)	0.0 (0.0)	0.0 (0.0)	0.0 (0.0)	0.0 (0.0)	0.0 (0.0)	2.4 (6.1)
Average precipitation days (≥ 0.01 in)	8.6	7.8	10.4	10.0	10.7	8.3	8.1	7.0	6.3	8.0	8.0	9.7	102.9
Average snowy days (≥ 0.1 in)	0.8	0.3	0.4	0.0	0.0	0.0	0.0	0.0	0.0	0.0	0.0	0.4	1.9
Source 1: NOAA
Source 2: XMACIS2 (mean maxima/minima 1981–2010)

== Demographics ==
Historical population
Census	Pop.	Note	%±
1870	532		—
1880	353		−33.6%
1890	682		93.2%
1900	1,640		140.5%
1910	2,011		22.6%
1920	2,070		2.9%
1930	2,330		12.6%
1940	2,784		19.5%
1950	3,318		19.2%
1960	3,782		14.0%
1970	4,794		26.8%
1980	6,366		32.8%
1990	6,188		−2.8%
2000	7,844		26.8%
2010	8,445		7.7%
2020	7,800		−7.6%

As of the 2020 census, Ripley had a population of 7,800.

=== Racial and ethnic composition ===
Ripley, Tennessees – Racial and ethnic composition Note: the US Census treats Hispanic/Latino as an ethnic category. This table excludes Latinos from the racial categories and assigns them to a separate category. Hispanics/Latinos may be of any race.
Race / Ethnicity (NH = Non-Hispanic)	Pop 2000	Pop 2010	Pop 2020	% 2000	% 2010	% 2020
White alone (NH)	4,015	3,630	2,758	51.19%	42.98%	35.36%
Black or African American alone (NH)	3,649	4,512	4,575	46.52%	53.43%	58.65%
Native American or Alaska Native alone (NH)	12	13	19	0.15%	0.15%	0.24%
Asian alone (NH)	21	33	34	0.27%	0.39%	0.44%
Pacific Islander alone (NH)	0	0	0	0.00%	0.00%	0.00%
Some Other Race alone (NH)	14	8	8	0.18%	0.09%	0.10%
Mixed Race or Multi-Racial (NH)	49	115	224	0.62%	1.36%	2.87%
Hispanic or Latino (any race)	84	134	182	1.07%	1.59%	2.33%
Total	7,844	8,445	7,800	100.00%	100.00%	100.00%

=== 2020 census ===
The median age was 36.3 years, 27.0% of residents were under the age of 18 and 16.3% of residents were 65 years of age or older. For every 100 females there were 82.2 males, and for every 100 females age 18 and over there were 76.4 males age 18 and over.

87.6% of residents lived in urban areas, while 12.4% lived in rural areas.

There were 3,172 households and 2,097 families; 33.8% of households had children under the age of 18, 26.6% were married-couple households, 19.5% were households with a male householder and no spouse or partner present, 47.1% were households with a female householder and no spouse or partner present, 34.6% of all households were made up of individuals, and 13.4% had someone living alone who was 65 years of age or older.

There were 3,477 housing units, of which 8.8% were vacant. The homeowner vacancy rate was 1.8% and the rental vacancy rate was 6.3%.

Racial composition as of the 2020 census
Race	Number	Percent
White	2,797	35.9%
Black or African American	4,591	58.9%
American Indian and Alaska Native	19	0.2%
Asian	34	0.4%
Native Hawaiian and Other Pacific Islander	5	0.1%
Some other race	104	1.3%
Two or more races	250	3.2%
Hispanic or Latino (of any race)	182	2.3%

=== 2000 census ===
As of the census of 2000, there was a population of 7,844, with 3,142 households and 2,054 families residing in the city. The population density was 612.3 inhabitants per square mile (236.4/km^{2}). There were 3,397 housing units at an average density of 265.2 per square mile (102.4/km^{2}). The racial makeup of the city was 51.56% White, 46.81% African American, 0.15% Native American, 0.27% Asian, 0.38% from other races, and 0.83% from two or more races. Hispanic or Latino of any race were 1.07% of the population.

There were 3,142 households, out of which 32.1% had children under the age of 18 living with them, 38.1% were married couples living together, 23.5% had a female householder with no husband present, and 34.6% were non-families. 31.0% of all households were made up of individuals, and 12.9% had someone living alone who was 65 years of age or older. The average household size was 2.44 and the average family size was 3.06.

In the city, the population was spread out, with 27.6% under the age of 18, 11.0% from 18 to 24, 27.2% from 25 to 44, 20.2% from 45 to 64, and 14.0% who were 65 years of age or older. The median age was 34 years. For every 100 females, there were 84.7 males. For every 100 females age 18 and over, there were 78.3 males.

The median income for a household in the city was $23,662, and the median income for a family was $34,183. Males had a median income of $31,321 versus $20,661 for females. The per capita income for the city was $13,710. About 22.1% of families and 27.2% of the population were below the poverty line, including 38.1% of those under age 18 and 27.5% of those age 65 or over.

== Education ==
All parts of the county are in the Lauderdale County School District.

Public K-12 schools:

- Ripley Middle School
- Ripley Primary School
- Ripley Elementary School
- Ripley High School

Other institutions:

- Abundant Life Christian School
- First Apostolic Academy
- Gateway Christian School

Tertiary:

- Tennessee Colleges of Applied Technology - Ripley
- University of Tennessee-Martin, Ripley Campus

== Religion ==
- Whitefield Assembly of God
- Maranatha Baptist Church
- Victory Baptist Church
- Asbury United Methodist Church
- Ave Maria Catholic Church
- Calvary Hill Baptist Church
- Curve Baptist Church
- First Apostolic Church
- First Assembly of God
- First Baptist Church
- First United Methodist Church
- Grace Baptist Church
- Holly Grove Baptist Church
- Kingdom Hall of Jehovah's Witnesses
- Mary's Chapel Baptist Church
- New Beginnings Christian Center
- Walnut Grove Baptist Church
- Whitefield Assembly of God
- Immanuel Episcopal Church
- Macedonia Baptist Church
- Ripley Church of God
- Ripley Church of Christ
- Spiller Hill Church of God In Christ
- Gospel Rock Holiness Church
- Olive Branch Baptist Church
- Spirit of Deliverance Ministries
- Lightfoot Methodist Church
- Abundant Life Assembly of God
- Central Community Church
- Elam Baptist Church

== Recreation and fitness ==
=== Ripley Parks and Recreation ===
Ripley Park, also known as Ripley Pool and Waterslide, is located at 200 Mary Robert. Its facilities include: a pool with water slide, playground equipment, seven pavilions that require reservations, grills, four athletic field complex, four state of the art tennis courts, 1.1 mile walking trail, large grassy areas parking, restrooms, and the park office.

W.G.L. Rice Park is located south of downtown Ripley, Tennessee. The park has a baseball/softball field, soccer field, tennis court, basketball court, two playgrounds, and a partial walking trail. Rice Park is the oldest city park in Ripley. The land for the park was donated in the early 1900s through a gift by the Rice Family and is noted for its historic Labor Day Celebration.

== Downtown revitalization ==
As one of the six cities selected in Tennessee for downtown revitalization, extensive work is being done around the town square and adjacent areas. Work began in the fall of 2008 and the courthouse square was completed in May 2010.

== Notable people ==
- Miles O'Keeffe, Hollywood actor
- Ray King, professional baseball pitcher
- Speech, rapper and hip-hop artist
- Peetie Wheatstraw, blues musician
