= Isaiah (given name) =

- Pronunciation: /aɪˈzeɪ.ə/
- Gender: Male

Origin
- Origin: Hebrew
- Meaning: 'Yahweh is salvation'

Other names
- Nicknames: Ike, Zai, Izzy

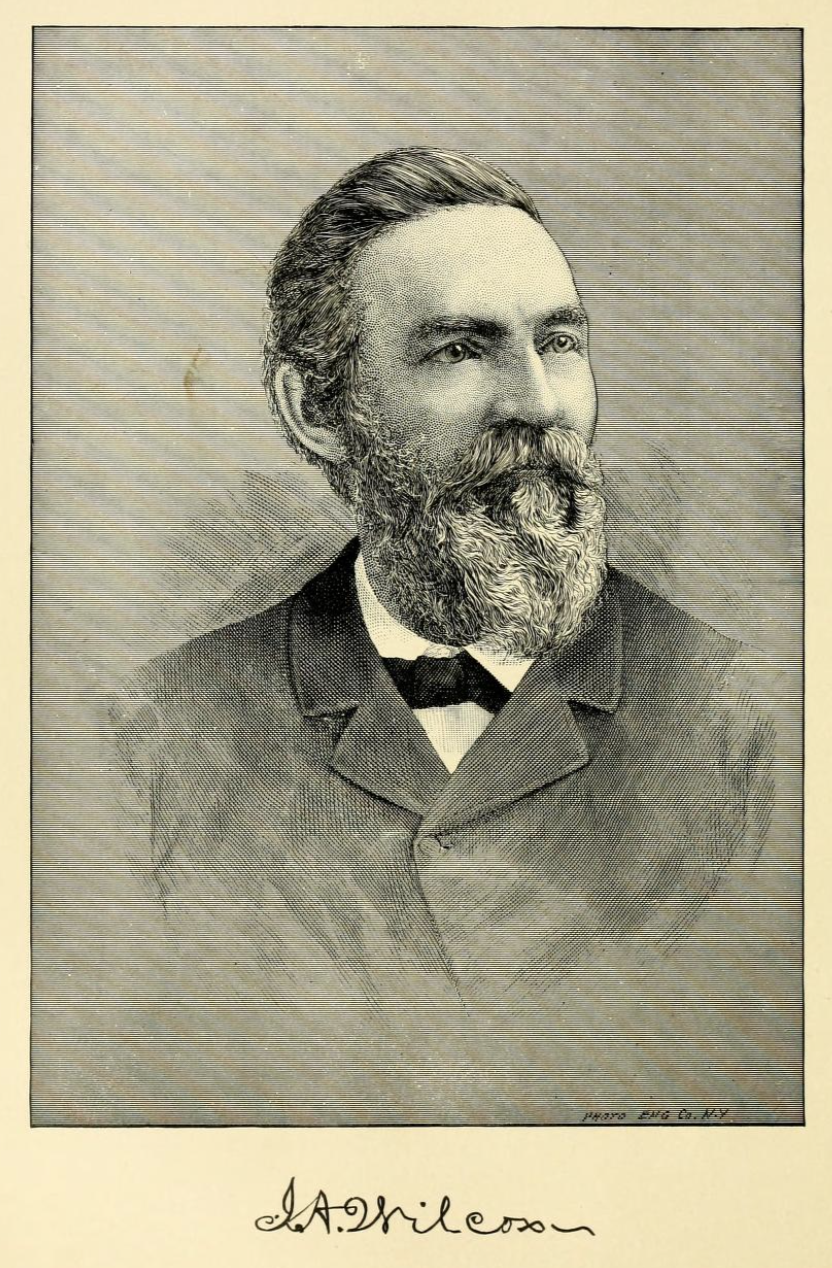
Isaiah Alonzo Wilcox

Isaiah is a masculine name of biblical origin. It comes from the Hebrew: יְשַׁעְיָהוּ (Yəšaʿyāhū or Yeshayahu), meaning 'Yahweh is salvation'. The best known Isaiah is a prophet, in the Book of Isaiah. In Ruthenia, the name Isaiah pervaded from Greek, in the form of Isaija, as well as in the abbreviated form Isaj, which in the fifteenth century was popular in Halic Rus, then connected to Poland for a hundred years.

== Notable people named Isaiah ==
=== Pre-modern era ===
Ordered chronologically.

- Isaiah of Gaza (died 491), Christian ascetic, writer and saint
- Isaiah I of Armenia, Catholicos (head bishop) of Armenia from 775 to 778
- Isaiah of Rostov (1062–1089/1090), Russian Christian missionary, bishop and Orthodox saint
- Isaiah of Salona (1780–1821) was a Greek cleric
- Isaiah di Trani (c. 1180 – c. 1250), Italian Talmudist
- Isaiah di Trani the Younger, 13th- and 14th-century Italian Talmudist and commentator, grandson of Isaiah di Trani
- Isaiah Bakish (c.1545–c.1620 fl.1580s–1620s), Spanish Rabbi
- Isaiah of Onogošt (died early 17th century), Serbian hermit and Orthodox saint

=== Modern era ===
Ordered alphabetically by surname

- Isaiah Adams (born 2000), American football player
- Isaiah Anderson (born 1989), American football player
- Isaiah Andrews (born 1986), American economist
- Isaiah Aram Minasian (born 1986), British violinist and orchestrator
- Isaiah Armwood, American basketball player
- Isaiah Austin (born 1993), American basketball coach and player
- Isaiah Balat (1952–2014), Nigerian politician
- Isaiah Battle (born 1993), American football player
- Isaiah Berlin (1909–1997), British social and political theorist, philosopher and historian of ideas
- Isaiah Bershadsky (1872-1908), Russian novelist
- Isaiah Beer Bing (1759–1805), French writer, translator, and Hebraist
- Isaiah Blankson (1944–2021), Ghanaian scientist, academic and engineer
- Isaiah Blood (1810–1870), American farmer, manufacturer and politician
- Isaiah Bolden (born 1999), American football player
- Isaiah Bond (born 2004), American football player
- Isaiah James Boodhoo (1932– 2004), Trinidadian painter and writer
- Isaiah Bowman (1878–1950), American geographer
- Isaiah Briscoe (born 1996), American basketball player
- Isaiah Bruse (born 1991), American football player
- Isaiah Buggs (born 1997), American football player
- Isaiah Campbell (born 1997), American baseball player
- Isaiah Canaan (born 1991), American basketball player
- Isaiah D. Clawson (1822–1879), American politician
- Isaiah Collier (born 2004), American basketball player
- Isaiah Coulter (born 1998), American football player
- Isaiah Cousins (born 1994), American basketball player in the Israeli Basketball Premier League
- Isaiah Cozart (born 2001), American basketball player
- Isaiah Crawford (born 2001), American basketball player
- Isaiah Crawley (born 1998), American basketball player
- Isaiah Crowell (born 1993), American football player
- Isaiah Davis (born 2002), American football player
- Isaiah Dixon (1922–2013), American politician and businessman
- Isaiah Sol Dorfman (1907–2005), American lawyer
- Isaiah Dorman (died 1876), former slave, interpreter for the US Army, and the only African American killed at the Battle of Little Big Horn
- Isaiah Drake (born 2005), American baseball player
- Isaiah Dudley (born 2003), Australian rules footballer
- Isaiah Dunn (born 1999), American football player
- Isaiah DeGrasse (1813–1841), American minister
- Isaiah Eisendorf (born 1996), American-Israeli basketball player in the Israeli Basketball Premier League
- Isaiah Ekejiuba (born 1981), Nigerian-American football player
- Isaiah Evans (born 2005), American college basketball player
- Isaiah Fawkes Everhart (1840–1911), American physician and naturalist
- Isayah Fatu, birth name of Zilla Fatu (born 1999), American professional wrestler
- Isaiah Firebrace (born 1999), Australian singer, also known by the mononym Isaiah
- Isaiah Ford (born 1996), American football player
- Isaiah Foskey (born 2000), American football player
- Isaiah Foster (born 2003), American soccer player
- Isaiah Frazier (1823–1864), American oil speculator
- Isaiah George (born 2004), Canadian ice hockey player
- Isaiah Glasker (born 2002), American football player
- Isaiah Green (born 1989), American football player
- Isaiah L. Green (1761–1841), American politician
- Isaiah Harris (1929–2001), baseball pitcher in the Negro leagues
- Isaiah Hart (1792–1861), American plantation owner and founder of Jacksonville, Florida
- Isaiah Hartenstein (born 1998), German-American basketball player
- Isaiah T. Hatton (1883–1921), American architect
- Isaiah H. Hedge (1812–1888), American physician, businessman, abolitionist and philanthropist
- Isaiah Hicks (born 1994), American basketball player
- Isaiah Hill (born 2002), American model and actor
- Isaiah Hodgins (born 1998), American football player
- Isaiah Horton, American football player
- Isaiah Horowitz (c. 1565–1630), Levite rabbi and mystic
- Isaiah Harris Hughes (1813–1891), English stage magician
- Isaiah Inman (1830–1889), American sheriff
- Isaiah Iongi (born 2003), Tongan-Australian rugby league footballer
- Isaiah Irving (born 1994), American football player
- Isaiah Iton (born 2001), American football player
- Isaiah Jackson (basketball) (born 2002), American basketball player
- Isaiah Jackson (conductor) (1945-2025), African American music conductor
- Isaiah Jewett (born 1977), American middle-distance runner
- Isaiah Jones, multiple people
- Isaiah Joe (born 1999), American basketball player
- Isaiah Johnson (disambiguation), multiple people
- Isaiah Johnston (born 2001), Canadian soccer player
- Isaiah Katumwa, Ugandan musician and saxophonist
- Isaiah Kacyvenski (born 1977), American football player
- Isaiah L. Kenen (1905–1988), Canadian-American journalist and lawyer
- Isaiah Kiplangat Koech (born 1993), Kenyan long-distance runner
- Isaiah Kopinsky (died 1640), Ukrainian Orthodox metropolitan
- Isaiah Land (born 2000), American football player
- Isaiah Langley (born 1996), American football player
- Isaiah Leacock (born 1999), Trinidadian footballer
- Isaiah Lee (born 1999), Trinidadian footballer
- Isaiah LeFlore (born 2002), American soccer player
- Isaiah Likely (born 2000), American football player
- Isaiah Livers (born 1998), American basketball player
- Isaiah Lukens (1779–1846), American clockmaker, gunsmith, machinist, and inventor
- Isaiah L. Lyons (1843–1871), American politician
- Isaiah Mack (born 1996), American football player
- Isaiah Marshall (born 2005), American football player
- Isaiah Mays (1858–1925), American soldier
- Isaiah Martinez (born 1994), American wrestler
- Isaiah McDuffie (born 1999), American football player
- Isaiah McGuire (born 2001), American football player
- Isaiah McKenzie (born 1995), American football player
- Isaiah McKinnon (born 1943), American politician, academic, and law enforcement officer
- Isaiah Miles (born 1994), American basketball player
- Isaiah Miller (born 1997), American basketball player
- Isaiah Mobley (born 1999), American basketball player
- Isaiah Montgomery (1847–1924), American community leader, politician, and founder of Mound Bayou, Mississippi
- Isaiah Morgan (1897–1966), American trumpeter
- Isaiah Morris (born 1969), American basketball player
- Isaiah Emmanuel Morter (1860– 1924), Belizean businessman
- Isaiah Moss (born 1996), American basketball player
- Isaiah Msibi (born 1984), Swazi middle-distance runner
- Isaiah Murphy, (born 1998), Japanese basketball player
- Isaiah Mustafa (born 1974), American actor and football player
- Isaiah Neyor (born 2001), American football player
- Isaiah Nixon (died 1948), African-American murder victim
- Isaiah Ntshangase (1966–2001), South African politician
- Isaiah Nwokobia (born 2002), American football player
- Isaiah Oggins (1898–1947), American communist spy for the Soviet Union
- Isaiah Okafor (born 2005), Swiss footballer
- Isaiah Oliver (born 1996), American football player
- Isaiah Osbourne (born 1976), English footballer
- Isaiah "Ikey" Owens (1974–2014), American keyboardist
- Isaiah Padua, American drag queen
- Isaiah Papali'i (born 1998), Samoa-New Zealand international rugby league footballer
- Isaiah Parente (born 2000), American soccer player
- Isaiah Parker (born 2002), American soccer player
- Isaiah Pead (born 1989), American football player
- Isaiah Perry (c.1854–1911), English Methodist minister
- Isaiah Philmore (born 1989), German basketball player
- Isaiah Pillars (1833–1895), American lawyer, member of the Ohio House of Representatives, and Ohio Attorney General
- Isaiah Pola-Mao (born 1999), American football player
- Isaiah Prince (born 1997), American football player
- Isaiah Rajah (born 1993), Trinidadian cricketer
- Isaiah Rankin (born 1978), English football forward
- Isaiah Rashad (born 1991), American rapper
- Isaiah Rice (1917–1980), American photographer
- Isaiah Rider (born 1971), American basketball player
- Isaiah Edward Robinson Jr. (1924–2011), African-American educator and Tuskegee Airman
- Isaiah Roby (born 1998), American basketball player
- Isaiah Rodgers (born 1997), American football player
- Isaiah Rogers (1800–1869), American architect
- Isaiah Rose (1843–1916), American politician
- Isaiah Rynders (1804–1885), American businessman, sportsman, underworld figure and political organizer for the Tammany Hall political machine
- Isaiah Sakpo (1912–1993), Nigerian Christian clergyman, evangelist, and writer
- Isaiah Rajendra Sanam (born 1977), Indian archer
- Isaiah Sategna III (born 2003), American football player
- Isaiah Saville (born 2000), American ice hockey player
- Isaiah Benjamin Scott (1854–1931), American theologian, educator, and journalist
- Isaiah Sellers (c. 1802–1864), riverboat captain
- Isaiah Shachar (1935–1977), Israeli historian
- Isaiah Sharkey (born 1989), American guitarist
- Isaiah Shavitt (1929–2012), Polish-Israeli chemist
- Isaiah Simmons (born 1998), American football player
- Isaiah Smithurst (1920–1982), English cricketer
- Isaiah Spiegel (1906–1990), Polish-Israeli poet, writer and essayist
- Isaiah Spiller (born 2001), American football player
- Isaiah Stalbird (born 2000), American football player
- Isaiah Stanback (born 1984), American football player
- Isaiah Stannard (born 2004), American actor
- Isaiah Stevens (born 2000), American basketball player
- Isaiah Stewart (born 2001), American basketball player
- Isaiah Stewart (born 19666), American musician
- Isaiah Stillman (1793–1861), Illinois militia officer involved in the Black Hawk War
- Isaiah Swann (born 1985), American basketball player
- Isaiah Swope, American basketball player
- Isaiah Sykes (born 1991), American basketball player
- Isaiah Tass (born 1999), Australian rugby league footballer
- Isaiah Taylor (born 1994), American basketball player in the Israeli Basketball Premier League
- Isaiah Thomas (disambiguation), multiple people
- Isaiah Todd (born 2001), American basketball player
- Isaiah Toothtaker (born 1981), American rapper
- Isaiah Turner (1876–1936), English footballer
- Isaiah Turner (born 1998), American Internet entrepreneur and software engineer
- Isaiah Washington (born 1963), American actor
- Isaiah Whaley (born 1998), American basketball player
- Isaiah Whitehead (born 1995), American basketball player
- Isaiah Wilkerson (born 1990), American basketball player
- Isaiah Wilkins (born 1995), American basketball player and coach
- Isaiah Williams (disambiguation), multiple people
- Isaiah Vansant Williamson (1803–1889), American merchant and philanthropist
- Isaiah Wilson (disambiguation), multiple people
- Isaiah Winstead (born 1999), American football player
- Isaiah Wong (born 2001), American basketball player
- Isaiah Wright (born 1997), American football player
- Isaiah Wynn (born 1996), American football player
- Isaiah Young (born 1998), American soccer player
- Isaiah Zagar (1939–2026), American mosaic artist
- Isaiah Zeldin (1920–2018), American rabbi
- Isaiah Zuber (born 1997), American football player

== Fictional characters ==
- Isaiah Bradley, Marvel Comics character
- Isaiah Crockett, DC Comics superhero
- Isaiah Richards "Lewins", the titular character of the 1995 drama film Losing Isaiah
- Isaiah Wright, main character in 2024 American Christian drama film The Forge

== See also ==
- Saint Isaiah (disambiguation)
- Isaiah (disambiguation)
- Isaias (given name)
- Isaia (name)

Short forms:

- Ike (given name)
- Izzy
