= Isia =

Isia may refer to:

- Isia (moth), a genus of moths in the subfamily Arctiinae
- isiA, a photosynthetic protein
- International Ski Instructors Association
- Istituto Superiore per le Industrie Artistiche, four Italian universities which train students in design

== See also ==
- Isaiah (disambiguation)
