= Isaiah (disambiguation) =

Isaiah is the main figure in the biblical Book of Isaiah.

Isaiah may also refer to:

- Isaiah (given name), including lists of people and fictional characters with this name
- Isaiah, pen name of Chinese science fiction writer Baoshu
- Isaiah, a figure in the Book of Mormon
- Isaiah, California, a ghost town
- VIA Nano, formerly codenamed VIA Isaiah, a 64 bit computer processor from VIA Technologies
- Isaiah (album)
- "Isiah", a song by Reks from Grey Hairs

== See also ==
- List of storms named Isaias
- Saint Isaiah (disambiguation)
