= Senator Rose =

Senator Rose may refer to:

- Daniel Rose (politician) (1772–1833), Maine State Senate
- Isaiah Rose (1843–1916), Ohio State Senate
- John A. Rose (born 1940), Kentucky State Senate
- John B. Rose (1875–1949), New York State Senate
- Leonard John Rose (1827–1899), California State Senate
- Paul Rose (American politician) (fl. 2010s), Tennessee State Senate

== See also ==
- Senator Rosa (disambiguation)
