= Ramon Foster =

American football player (born 1986)

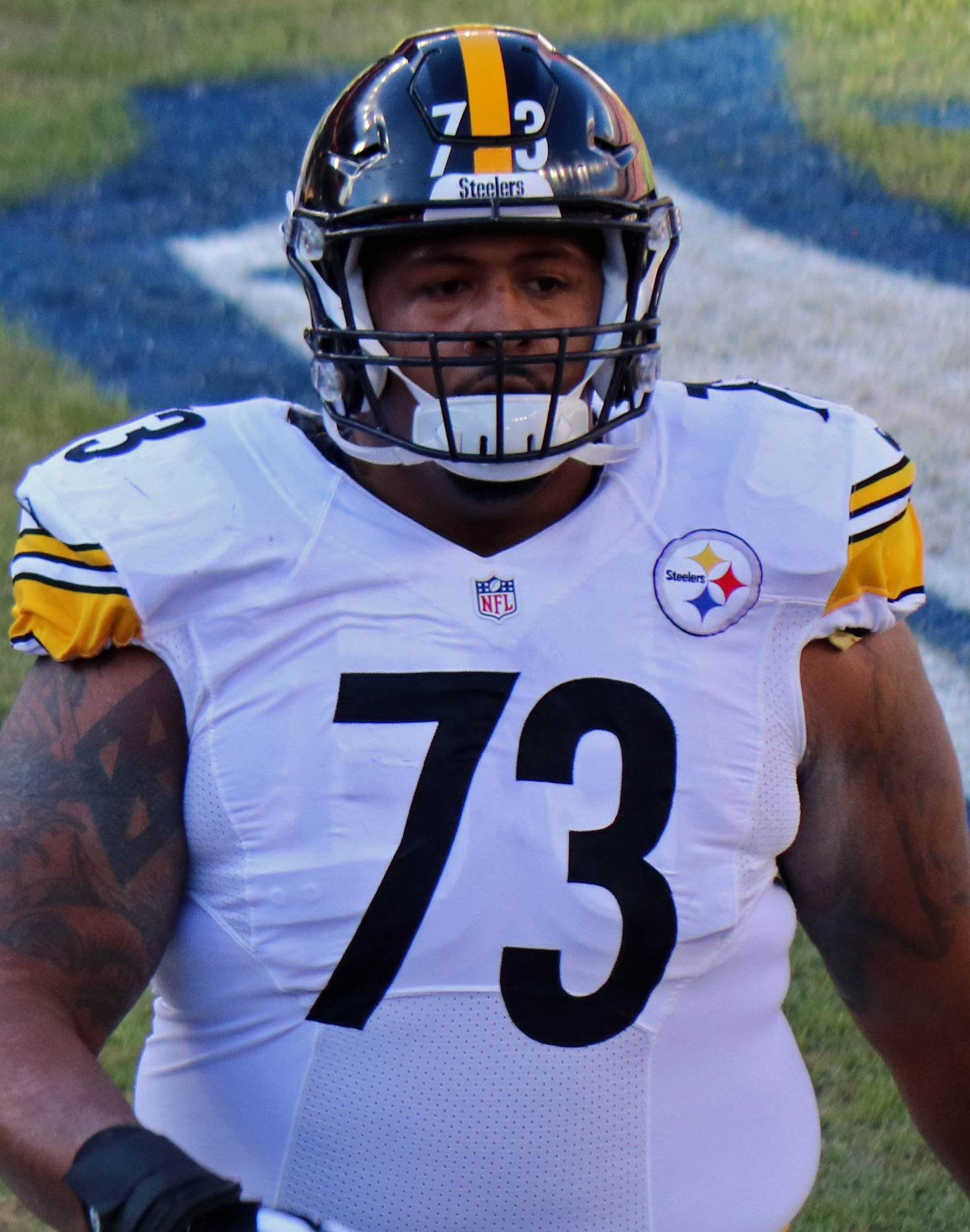
- Foster with the Pittsburgh Steelers in 2016

No. 73
- Position: Guard

Personal information
- Born: January 7, 1986 (age 40); Henning, Tennessee, U.S.
- Listed height: 6 ft 5 in (1.96 m)
- Listed weight: 328 lb (149 kg)

Career information
- High school: Ripley (Ripley, Tennessee)
- College: Tennessee
- NFL draft: 2009: undrafted

Career history
- Pittsburgh Steelers (2009–2019)

Awards and highlights
- Second-team All-SEC Rivals.com (2007); Freshman All-SEC Coaches (2005); ESPN All-MayDay Team (2007)

Career NFL statistics
- Games played: 160
- Games started: 145
- Stats at Pro Football Reference

Ramon Sentel Foster (born January 7, 1986), nicknamed "the Big Ragu", is an American former professional football player who was a guard for 11 seasons with the Pittsburgh Steelers of the National Football League (NFL). He is the brother of former Rams offensive lineman Renardo Foster. He played college football for the Tennessee Volunteers where he played in a career total of 44 games and also earned All-SEC honors as a freshman and a junior.

== Early life ==
Foster started for all four years, both on offense and defense, at Ripley High School in Ripley, Tennessee and handled some placekicking and kickoff duties. In addition, he was a three-year starter on the school's basketball team and competed in track and field, achieving a career-best shot put of 45–11.

== Professional career ==
=== Pre-draft ===
Coming out of Tennessee in 2009, Foster attended the NFL Combine and participated at Tennessee's annual Pro Day. He was projected by many analysts to be drafted from anywhere from the sixth to seventh round or a priority undrafted free agent. He was rated as the 23rd best offensive tackle in the draft out of the 183 available by NFLDraftScout.com.

Pre-draft measurables
Height	Weight	Arm length	Hand span	40-yard dash	10-yard split	20-yard split	20-yard shuttle	Three-cone drill	Vertical jump	Broad jump	Bench press
6 ft 5 1/8 in (1.96 m)	328 lb (149 kg)	34 1/2 in (0.88 m)	10 in (0.25 m)	5.66 s	2.00 s	3.30 s	4.98 s	7.96 s	26 in (0.66 m)	7 ft 8 in (2.34 m)	20 reps
All values from NFL Combine

=== 2009 ===
On April 27, 2009, Foster was signed as an undrafted free agent by the Pittsburgh Steelers.

He entered training camp competing to be a back-up guard against the Steelers' 2009 third-round draft pick, Kraig Urbik. Following an injury to starting veteran guard Darnell Stapleton during training camp, Foster gained the opportunity to become the starting right guard. He ultimately lost the starting job to Trai Essex and was named at backup guard and right tackle to begin the season. He made his professional regular season debut during a Week 3 contest at the Cincinnati Bengals. On November 29, 2009, he received his first career start in a Week 12 loss, to the division-rival Baltimore Ravens, after replacing an injured Chris Kemoeatu at left guard. Foster returned to the starting position on December 20, 2009, against the Green Bay Packers and remained there for the last three games of the regular season, as the Steelers ended with a 9–7 record and missed the playoffs.

As a rookie in 2009, Foster had four starts and played in 14 games.

=== 2010 ===
Although he finished his rookie season as the starting left guard, he entered training camp competing with Essex and Urbik for the starting job. He was named the backup to starting guards Essex and Kemoeatu to begin the season and made his season debut in a Week 3 38–13 victory at the Tampa Bay Buccaneers. On November 14, 2010, he made his first start of the season, replacing an ineffective Essex at right guard, in a 39–26 loss to the New England Patriots. He then remained the starting guard for last 7 games of the 2010 season. The Steelers finished atop the AFC North with a 12–4 record and Foster went on to start at right guard in a 31–25 loss to the Green Bay Packers in Super Bowl XLV. He finished his second season with 8 starts in 12 games played.

=== 2011 ===
Foster entered training camp in 2011 competing with Kemoeatu, Doug Legursky, and Essex for both starting guard positions. He lost the starting right guard position to Legursky but was named the starter for a Week 2 victory over the Seattle Seahawks. After sitting out the next week, he returned in Week 4 against the Houston Texans and remained the starter for the rest of the season. This marked the third consecutive year he began the year as a backup but finished the season as a starter; also marking the beginning of Foster being a mainstay on the Steelers offensive line. He finished 2011 with a career-high 14 games started in 15 games played.

=== 2012 ===
Foster was named the starting right guard after winning the job over rookie David DeCastro and started the Steeler's season-opener against Denver Broncos. This also marked his first full season playing and starting at guard.

=== 2013 ===
He was moved over to left guard after the departure of Willie Colon and started all but one game throughout the season. The Steelers kept Foster out due to injury during a Week 11 matchup against the Detroit Lions. On March 11, 2013, the Steelers signed Foster to a three-year, $5.50 million contract that also included a $900,000 signing bonus. They rewarded him with a new contract after showing promise the last two seasons.

=== 2014 ===
He started the Steelers' season-opening 30–27 victory over the Cleveland Browns and started the following game. Foster then missed Week 3 and 4, after twisting his ankle during a practice. He returned to his starting role during a Week 5 victory at the Jacksonville Jaguars. He started 14 games in 2014, helping the Steelers finish first in the AFC North with an 11–5 record. They went on to lose the AFC Wildcard game 30–17 to the Baltimore Ravens.

=== 2015 ===
Foster started at left guard throughout the 2015 season and started all 16 regular season games. The Steelers finished second in the AFC North with a 10–6 record. After defeating the Bengals in the AFC Wildcard, they went on to lose the divisional round to the eventual Super Bowl 50 champion Broncos. Foster had one of his best seasons after improving as a run blocker and surrendering only 31 pressures in all 18 games. He earned a grade of 82.3 from Pro Football Focus (PFF) in 2015.

=== 2016 ===
On May 9, 2016, the Steelers signed Foster to a three-year, $9.60 million contract with a signing bonus $2.75 million. He started all 16 regular season games and surrendered only one sack throughout the whole season. Foster brought his streak to 46 consecutive starts in-a-row. PFF ranked him the 24th best offensive lineman in 2015. He was also ranked the sixth best guard with an overall grade of 87.1 by PFF and the fourth best in pass blocking with a grade of 89.7.

=== 2019 ===
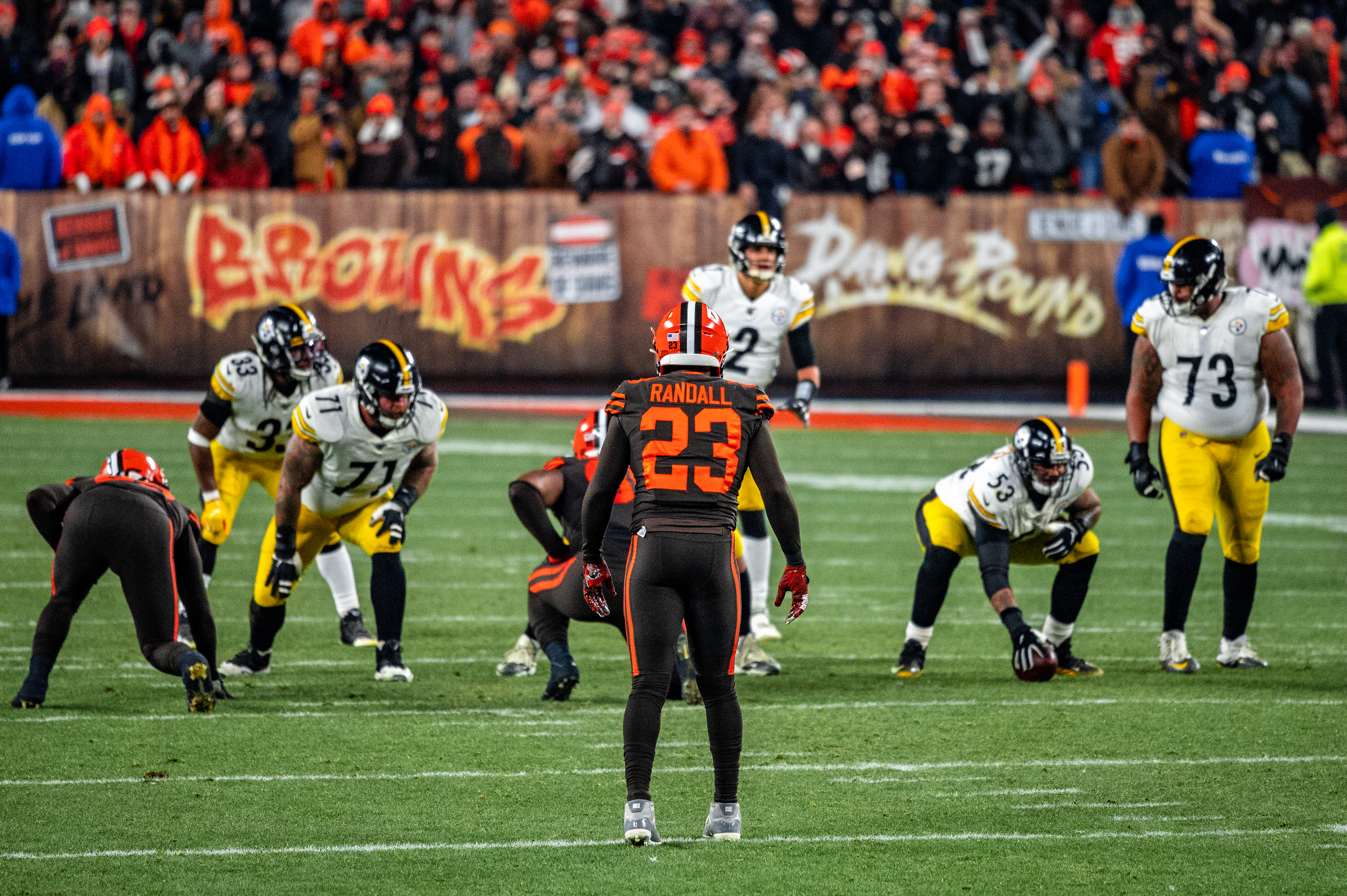
Foster (73) in a game against the Cleveland Browns in 2019

On March 7, 2019, Foster signed a two-year, $8.25 million contract extension with the Steelers through the 2020 season.

Foster announced his retirement on March 16, 2020.

== Post-playing career ==
Foster was the color commentator for the Tennessee Volunteers football network in 2025. He also called games from the sideline for the Pittsburgh Steelers and hosted a podcast, The Ramon Foster Steelers Show, where he discussed Steelers football.

Foster left the Vols Network radio booth to become the Tennessee Titans radio color analyst on May 21, 2026. He replaced Dave McGinnis who passed away on April 13, 2026. His connection to the Pittsburgh Steelers, a Titans rival, was met with opposition from the sports media in Nashville.

In 2024, Foster became a hearings officer for the NFL to oversee player appeals for fines and suspensions.
