= Judensau at the choir stalls of Cologne Cathedral =

Antisemitism in Germany

Coordinates: 50°56′29″N 6°57′30″E

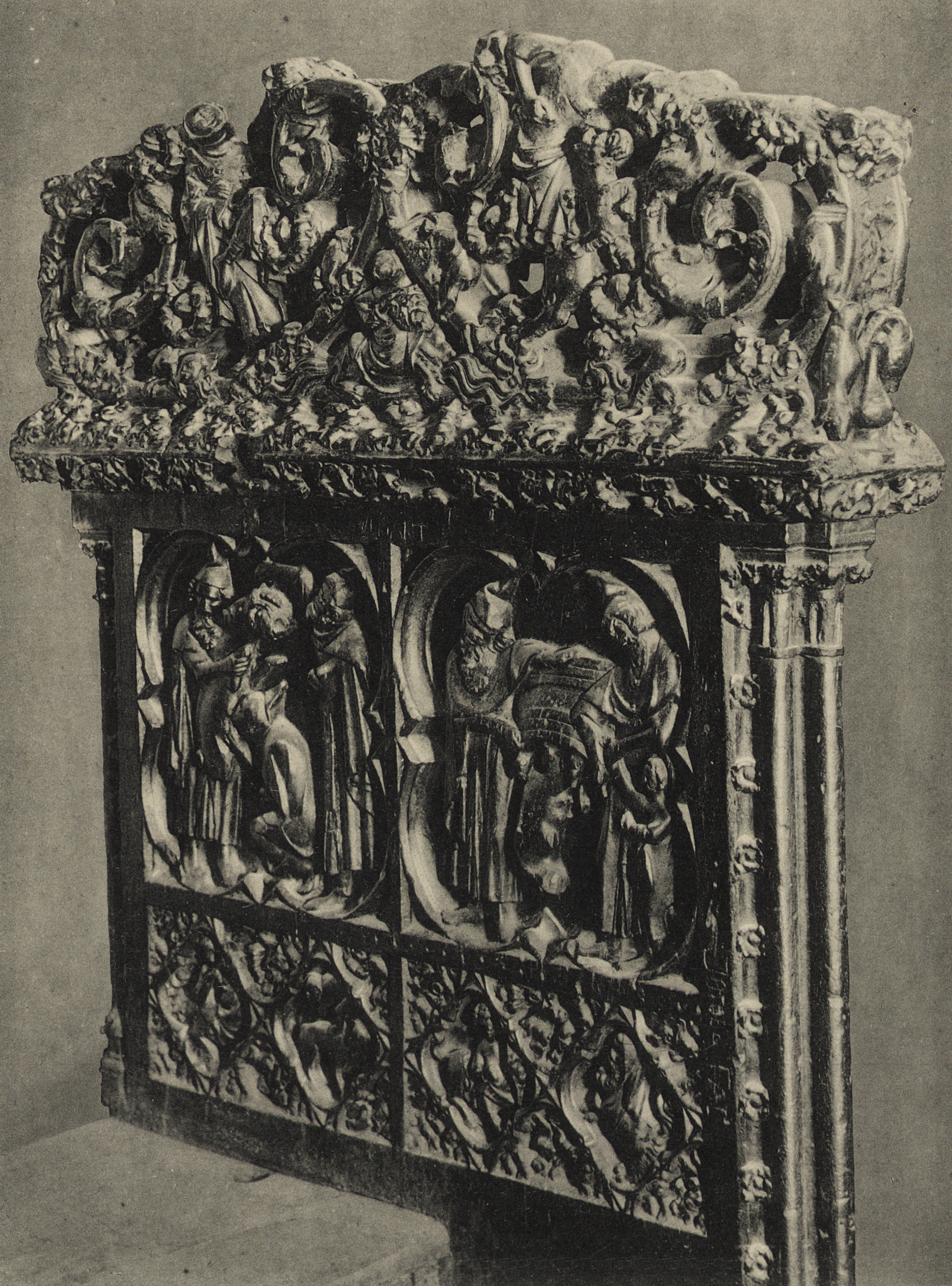
Choir seating of Cologne Cathedral with Judensau (left) and blood libel motif (right)

The Judensau at the choir stalls of Cologne Cathedral is a medieval wood carving at the side of one of the seats in the choir of Cologne Cathedral. It was produced between 1308 and 1311. It shows a Jews' sow, an antisemitic folk art image of Jews in obscene contact with a large female pig, which in Judaism is an unclean animal. It is one of the oldest representations of this theme. Directly beside is another motif, which is generally interpreted as an illustration of the blood libel legend. This combination is only known from one other case, a painting from the 15th century at the Old Bridge in Frankfurt.

The cathedral chapter and mason's lodge of the cathedral want to keep and display the wood carvings at their original position. This decision has been controversially discussed and criticised by parts of the public on several occasions, although the sculptures may only be accessed by permission within bespoke guided tours.

== Location ==
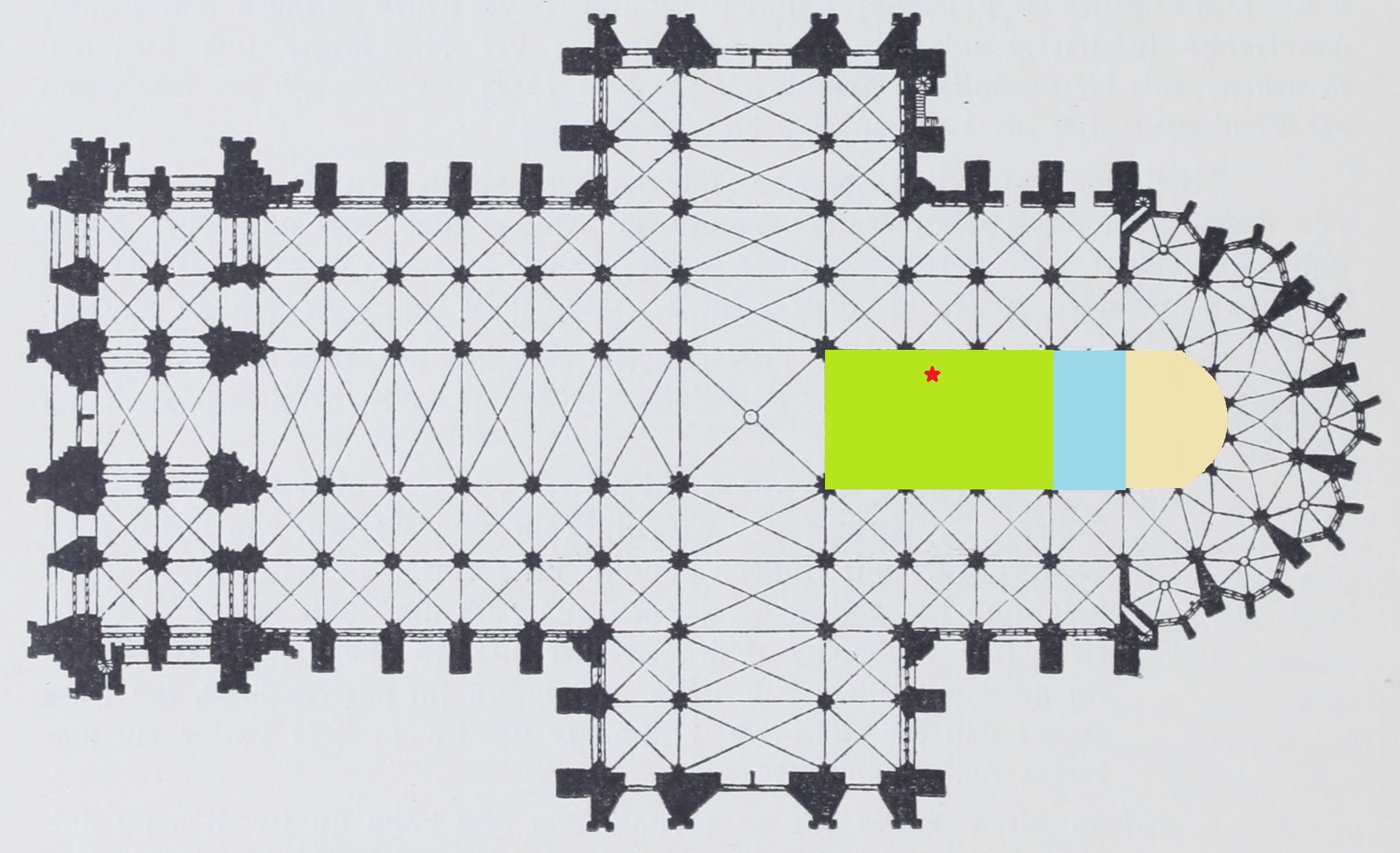
Judensau marked in red on the Cologne Cathedral's floor plan

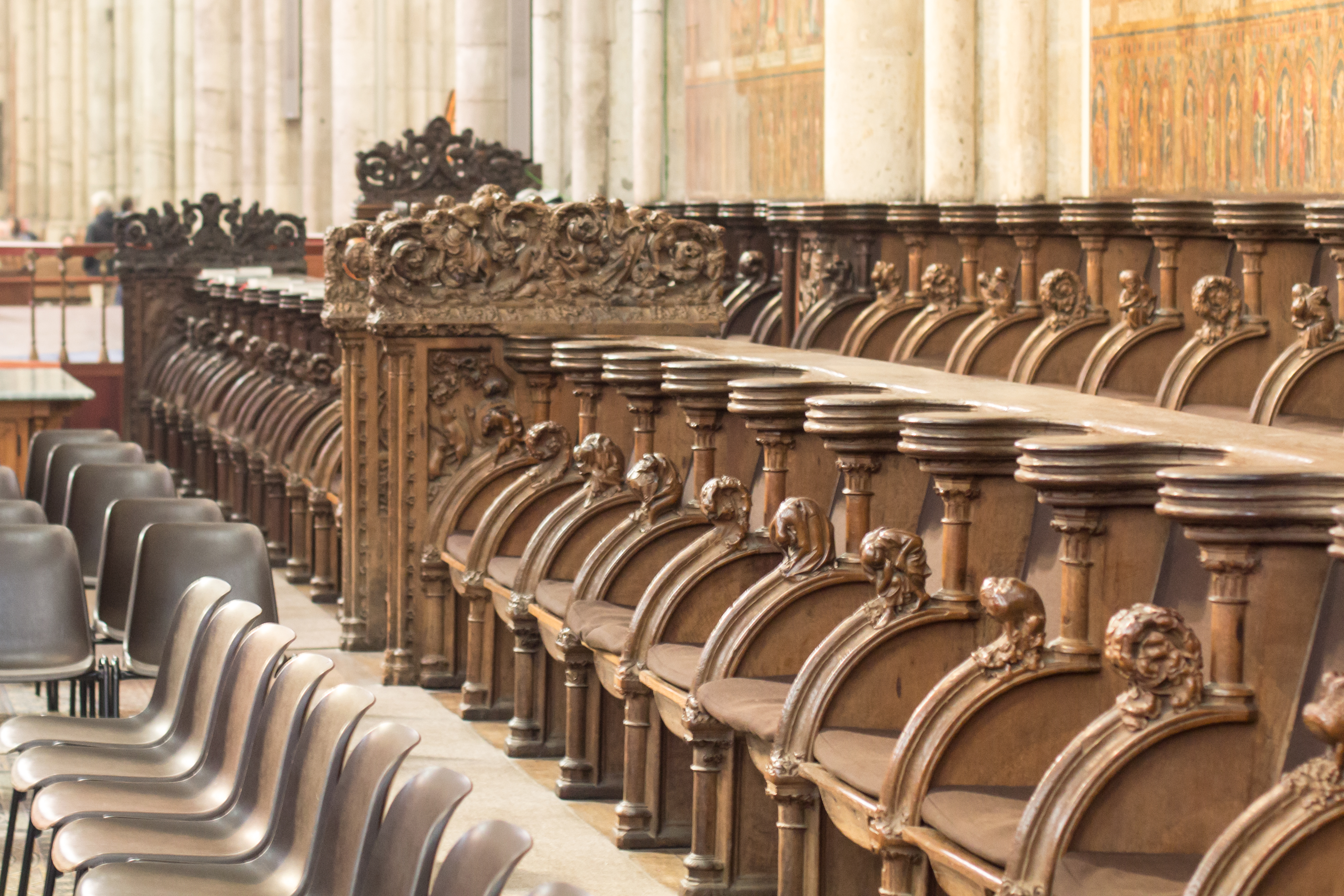
Northern, most foremost choir stalls, view onto the Parclose with the carved pig

The choir stall of Cologne Cathedral consists of wooden seats. Two longitudinal rows of them are installed each on the northern and southern side of the cathedral choir, just in front of the chancel screens. The front rows are divided in two equal parts each, to provide access to the row behind.

The woodcarvings of Judensau and of the blood libel are shown on the eastern, i.e. on the right hand side of the northern walkway. This area is normally roped-off, and may only be accessed on special occasions with a tour guide.

== Manufacture ==
The choir stall of Cologne Cathedral is with 104 seats one of the largest in Germany. It was carved from 1308 to 1311 by unknown craftsmen. The interior construction of the choir was completed by 1300, when the vaults were finished. The interior decoration was built subsequently, until the choir was inaugurated on 27 September 1322.

Some of the 500 figures and ornaments were made by craftsmen from the Paris area or the Lorraine, who were specialised in stone masonry and/or wood carving. Others show by a mix-up of styles and their blunt finish that they were made by laborers or apprentices.

The Judensau and the other two wood carvings were probably made by a local man due to their unelaborate design and the unusual motif.

== Description ==
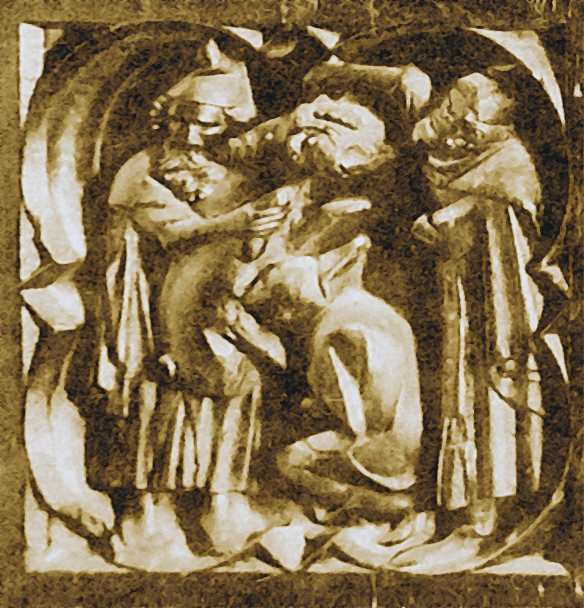
Quatrefoil showing the Judensau motif

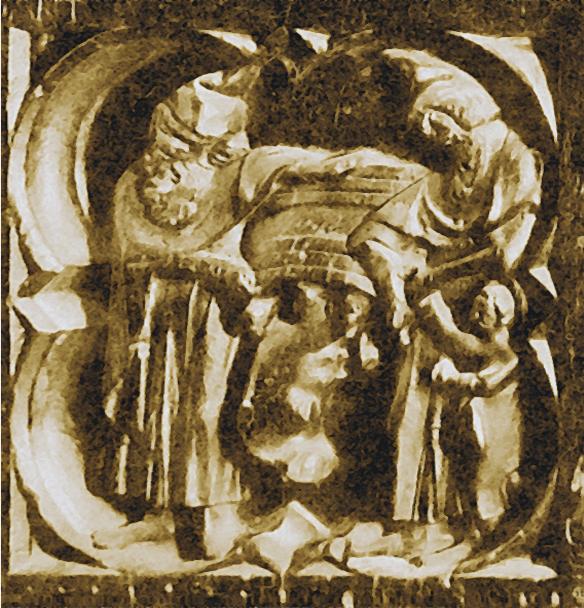
Quatrefoil showing the blood libel

The Judensau and blood libel motifs are wooden reliefs, which fill side-by-side two quatrefoils. The quatrefoil on the left hand side shows three men, who can be distinguished as Jews by their Jewish hats. One of them lifts up the rear end of the pig, one feeds it and one sucks at one of its teats.

The quatrefoil on the right hand side shows two Jews, who empty a tub, out of which a slaughtered pig and three piglets fall. The Jew on the right hand side leads a young boy to the scene, who can be distinguished as Christian because of a hint of a halo.

A third relief on the other side of the armrest may be associated by its location and its motif with the other two. On a spandrel of the inner armrest are shown two pigs, which eat the leaves of an acorn. One of the two pigs jumped-up onto its rear legs and a third one sucks on one of its teats. A monk observes the scene from the background partially covered by a volute.

== Symbolism ==
The pig symbolises gluttony, vice or the devil in early Christian iconography. It was only disrespectfully associated with Jews in the 9th century. The caricature of Jews as pigs or Jews sucking at the teats or anus of a pig makes reference to the kashrut, according to which the consumption of pig products is prohibited.

The historian Heribert Reiners described in 1909 the connection between the two motifs at the front. He interpreted that the Jews on the right hand side throw away the pork, which had been given to them by others, to look as if they were kosher. Their true immoderateness was shown in the scene on the left hand side, where they drink the milk of the pig. de:Bernhard von Tieschowitz explained the scenes in 1930, while he highlighted that they are controversely interpreted. He concluded that both of them showed the blood libel, an accusation that Jews kidnapped and murdered the children of Christians in order to use their blood as part of their religious rituals during Jewish holidays.

The Israeli art historian Isaiah Shachar interprets the scene on the right hand side, as if the Jews throw away the pork meat and kidnap a Christian child to be eaten. It could be a depiction of the alleged ritual murder of Werner of Oberwesel, who was killed in 1287. Shachar sees all three scenes relating to each other as a representation of vice and gluttony.

Virtue opposes vice on many occasions in the choir stalls. In this case we find directly opposite two reliefs with the Judgment of Solomon as a symbol for justice. The left panel shown the well-known story of splitting the baby. The one on the right hand side shows the less known motif of shooting the dead father. This motif stems from the time around 400 AD as an illustration of the honest distribution of property in the Talmud. For the Jews, the wise judge was a rabbi instead of the figure of Solomon.

== Other antisemitic sculptures at Cologne Cathedral ==
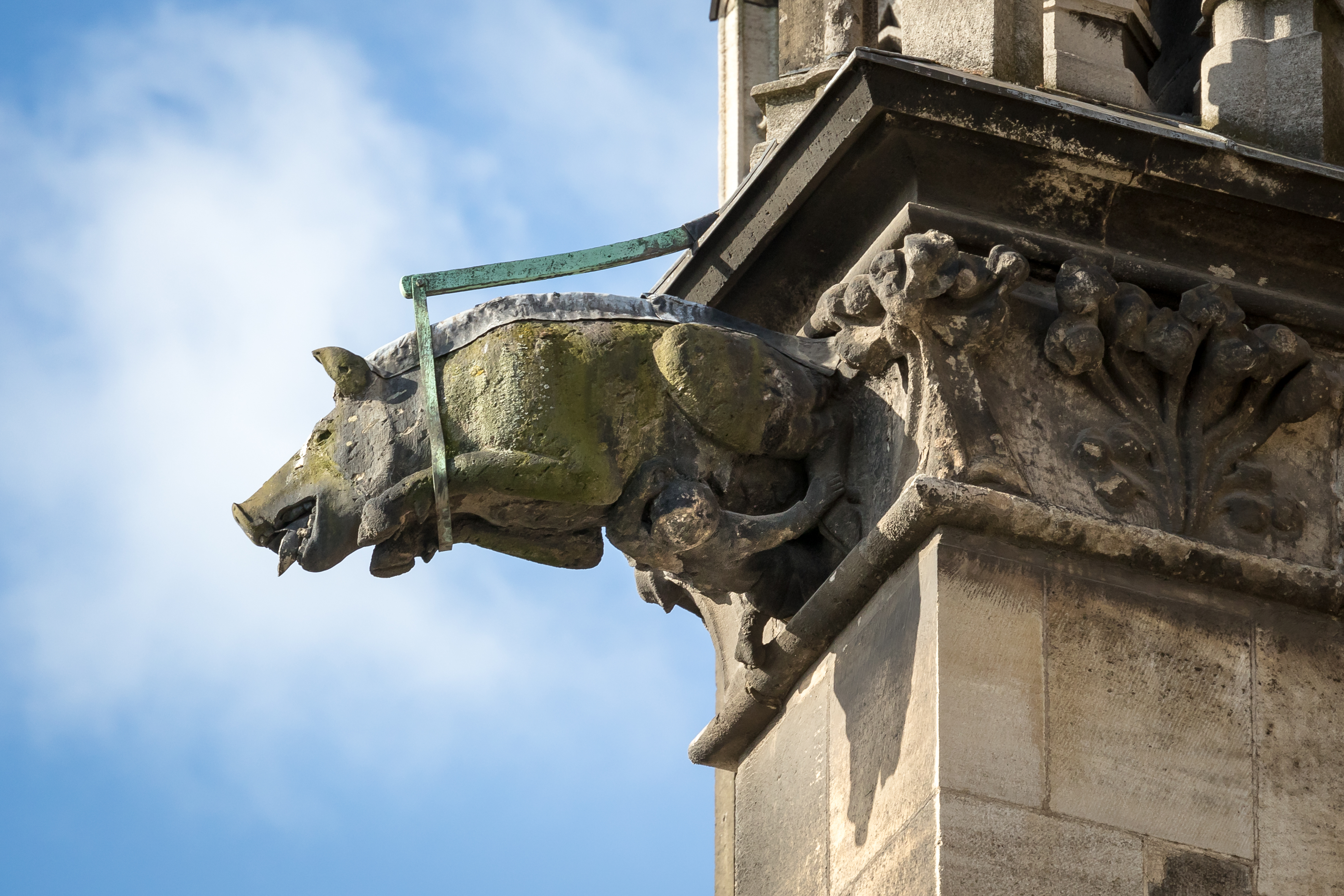
Judensau as a gargoyle at Cologne Cathedral, around 1280

On the back of the Shrine of the Three Kings (1190–1225) is a scene, which shows the flagellation of Jesus Christ by two henchmen with Jewish hats. It is interpreted not because of the hats, but because of the caricature-like distorted faces of the henchmen. It is probably one of the first examples of overemphasised Jewish noses as an anti-Jewish stereotype.

An exterior cornice of one of the chapels of the cathedral is a gargoyle, which shows a squatting pig. At its teats suckles a male figurine, which depicts a Jew. It dates from around 1280.

== Controversy around the Judensau ==
In 2005, the Munich-based artists Wolfram P. Kastner and Günter Wangerin requested emphatically to remove the Judensau, or at least put up a sign with an explanation. In addition, they wanted two pieces of stone masonry approximately 50 metres (160 ft) tall, depicting two swastikas, to be removed. Kastner made repeated requests for their removal and staged acts of protest against the Christian church. The artists placed signs in front of Cologne Cathedral, in which they claimed "all Christians lie" (alle Christen lügen).

The cathedral chapter and Barbara Schock-Werner, the head of the cathedral workshop, raised their opinion that the anti-Jewish wood carvings could not be removed from the choir stalls. An explanatory sign was not acceptable, because Cologne Cathedral was a church and not a museum. In addition they explained that the choir stall with the reliefs was not accessible to the public.

In 2006, the controversy triggered a conference by the cathedral workshop in collaboration with the Karl-Rahner-Akademie with the title "Cologne Cathedral and 'the Jews'" (Der Kölner Dom und 'die Juden'). In 2008, the cathedral workshop and the Zentral-Dombau-Verein zu Köln dedicated a complete issue of the Kölner Domblatt to this topic and the results of the conference.

In 2017, the cathedral chapter and Cologne Society for Christian-Jewish Cooperation created a dedicated working group on the same issues, titled "The Cathedral and 'the Jews'." In 2023, the group launched an art competition to add a new piece of art to the cathedral that examined the present and future of Jewish-Christian relations in awareness of their full past. By 3 April 2025, the Cologne Cathedral International Art Competition ended with Andrea Büttner winning for her mural exposing hidden Jewish history in the cathedral. The mural will be in the Chapel of St. Mary, above and behind the existing Altarpiece of the Patron Saints of Cologne. The mural depicts a life-size realistic painting of the stone base of a Torah ark, the same base the altarpiece later originally rested on. This is because the altarpiece was created for the St. Maria in Jerusalem chapel, which replaced a synagogue in 1424, the year after Cologne expelled all its Jews from the city. The mural will show the stone base floating above the altarpiece. Büttner stated that she didn't believe art could make the cathedral's many antisemitic pieces more tolerable by commentary, and instead wanted her piece to "take something that has been hidden from the cathedral's visitors up to now and have it openly displayed in a central location."

== Literature ==
- Ulrike Bergmann: Das Chorgestühl des Kölner Domes, Text and inventory (Jahrbuch 1986/1987 des Rheinischen Vereins für Denkmalpflege und Landschaftsschutz). Neuss: Neusser Druckerei und Verlag 1987, ISBN 3-88094-600-0.
- Ulrike Bergmann: Das Chorgestühl (Meisterwerke des Kölner Domes 3). Verlag Kölner Dom, Köln 1995, ISBN 3-922442-23-4 (48 pages, many detailed photos).
- Ulrike Brinkmann and Rolf Lauer: Judendarstellungen im Kölner Dom. In: Kölner Domblatt 2008, 73rd Volume, pages 13–58, ISSN 0450-6413, ISBN 978-3-922442-65-3.
- Georg Bönisch: Bartholomäusnacht am Rhein. In: Spiegel Geschichte 2015, Heft 1, pages 80–83, ISSN 1868-7318, Digitalisat PDF 1,4 MB.
- Bernd Wacker and Rolf Lauer (editors): Der Kölner Dom und ›die Juden‹. Conference of the Karl Rahner Akademie Köln in collaboration with the mason's lodge of Cologne from 18 to 19 November 2006. (Kölner Domblatt 2008, 73rd Volume). Cologne: Verlag Kölner Dom, ISBN 978-3-922442-65-3.
- Isaiah Shachar: The Judensau. A Medieval Anti-Jewish Motif and its History. Warburg Institute, London 1974, ISBN 0-85481-049-8.
- Bernhard von Tieschowitz: Das Chorgestühl des Kölner Domes. Marburg: Verlag des Kunstgeschichtlichen Seminars der Universität Marburg 1930.
