= Isaiah Jones =

Isaiah Jones may refer to:

- Isaiah Jones (footballer, born 1999), Guyanese footballer for Luton Town
- Isaiah Jones (footballer, born 2001), English footballer for Chesham United
- Isaiah Jones (footballer, born 2006), Sierra Leonean footballer for Nashville SC
- Isaiah Jones (linebacker) (born 2003), American football linebacker
- Zay Jones (born 1995), wide receiver
