= Isaias (given name) =

Isaías is the Spanish and Portuguese language form of the biblical name Isaiah.

Notable people with the name include:

- Isaias of Constantinople (died 1332), Ecumenical Patriarch of Constantinople from 1323 to 1332
- Isaias Afwerki (born 1942), first and current president of Eritrea
- Isaías Carrasco (1964–2008), Basque politician
- Isaías D'Oleo Ochoa (born 1980), Costa Rican poet
- Isaías Duarte Cancino (1939–2002), Colombian Catholic priest and Archbishop of Cali
- Isaias W. Hellman (1842–1920), German-born American banker and philanthropist, and a founding father of the University of Southern California
- Isaías Marques Soares (born 1963), Brazilian footballer
- Isaías Medina Angarita (1897–1953), President of Venezuela from 1941 to 1945
- Isaías de Noronha (1874–1963), Brazilian admiral and member of the junta that governed Brazil in 1930
- Isaías Rodríguez (born 1942), Venezuelan politician, diplomat and lawyer, Vice President of Venezuela in 2000
- Isaías Samakuva (born 1946), Angolan politician
- Isaías Sánchez (born 1987), Spanish footballer
- Isaías Sávio (1902–1977), Uruguayan classical guitarist, composer, and music educator
- Isaías Silva Aragão (1967–2007), Brazilian footballer

== See also ==
- Esaias Tegnér, Swedish writer
- Isaia (name)
- Hurricane Isaias
