= Senator Rosa =

Senator Rosa may refer to:

- Ángel Rosa (fl. 2010s), Senate of Puerto Rico
- José Pérez Rosa (fl. 2010s), Senate of Puerto Rico

== See also ==
- Senator Rose (disambiguation)
