= Isaiah Crawley =

American basketball player (born 1998)

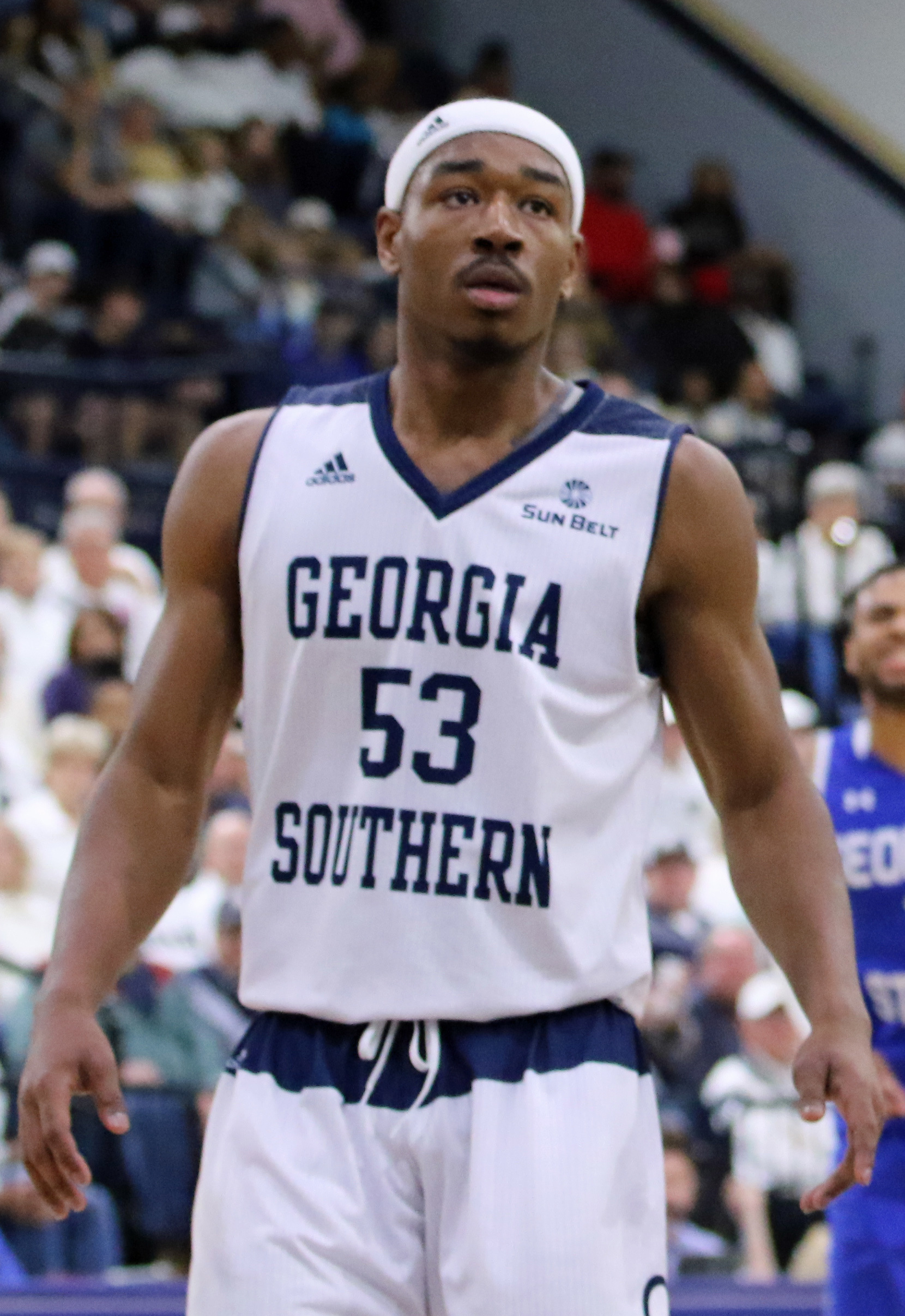
- Crawley with Georgia Southern in 2020

No. 53 – Dinamo Vladivostok
- Position: Power forward
- League: VTB United League

Personal information
- Born: August 19, 1998 (age 28) Dyersburg, Tennessee
- Listed height: 6 ft 7 in (2.01 m)
- Listed weight: 210 lb (95 kg)

Career information
- High school: Ripley (Ripley, Tennessee)
- College: Columbia State CC (2016–2018); Georgia Southern (2018–2020)
- NBA draft: 2020: undrafted
- Playing career: 2020–present

Career history
- 2020–2022: Tigers Tübingen
- 2022–2023: Salon Vilpas
- 2023: Budapest Honvéd
- 2023–2024: Dziki Warszawa
- 2024-2025: Elitzur Shomron
- 2025–present: Dinamo Vladivostok

Career highlights
- First-team All-NJCAA (2018)

Isaiah Deion Crawley (born August 19, 1998) is an American professional basketball player for Dinamo Vladivostok of the VTB United League. He played college basketball for Columbia State Community College and Georgia Southern.

== Early life and high school career ==
Crawley attended Ripley High School. He averaged 21.5 points and 14.5 rebounds per game as a senior and led the team to a 26–8 record. He received All-State, All-District 15 Class regular season and All-Tournament honors, while also being named the 15-AA Tournament Most Valuable Player. Crawley scored 1,500 points in high school. He signed with Columbia State Community College because he liked the academics.

== College career ==
As a freshman at Columbia State Community College, Crawley averaged 14.4 points and 7.8 rebounds per game, earning Second Team All-NJCAA honors. He posted 17.7 points and 8.6 rebounds per game as a sophomore. Crawley was named to the First Team All-NJCAA. Following the season, he transferred to Georgia Southern. Crawley averaged 11.6 points and 5.5 rebounds per game as a junior, shooting 63.5 percent from the field. On November 11, 2019, he scored a career-high 31 points and had five assists in an 80–77 loss to North Florida. Crawley suffered an injury in a loss to North Dakota on November 30 and missed two games. He scored 24 points and grabbed 10 rebounds on January 16, 2020, in an 82–66 victory over Troy. As a senior, Crawley averaged 13.2 points, 6.7 rebounds, and 1.9 assists per game, shooting 61.8 percent from the floor. He was selected to the Dark Horse Dunker Competition.

== Professional career ==
On August 29, 2020, Crawley signed his first professional contract with Tigers Tübingen of the ProA.
