= Isaia (name) =

Isaia is a given name and surname. Notable people with the name include:

== People with the given name ==
- Isaia Cordinier (born 1996), French basketball player
- Isaia Gonewai, Fijian politician
- Isaia Italeli (1960s–2011), Tuvaluan politician
- Isaia Răcăciuni (1900–1976), Romanian writer and editor
- Isaia Rasila (1969–2010), Fijian rugby union player
- Isaia Taape, Tuvaluan politician
- Isaia Toeava (born 1986), New Zealand rugby union player

== People with the surname ==
- Enrico Isaia, founder of eponymous Neapolitan tailoring brand
- Lino Isaia, politician from Tokelau
- Sale Isaia (born 1972), former American football player

== See also ==
- Isaia, Italian menswear brand
- Isaiah (given name)
- Isaias (given name)
