= Isaiah Williams =

Isaiah Williams may refer to:

- Isaiah Williams (wide receiver, born 1987) (born 1987), American football wide receiver
- Isaiah Williams (wide receiver, born 2001) (born 2001), American football wide receiver
- Isaiah Williams (offensive lineman) (born 1993), American football offensive lineman

== See also ==
- Isiah Williams (disambiguation)
