= Isaiah Wilson (disambiguation) =

Isaiah Wilson (born 1999), is an American football offensive tackle.

Isaiah Wilson may also refer to:

- Isaiah Wilson (basketball) (born 1948), American basketball player
- Isaiah Wilson Snugs House, on the National Register of Historic Places in North Carolina
