= Isaiah Jones (footballer, born 2001) =

English footballer (born 2001)

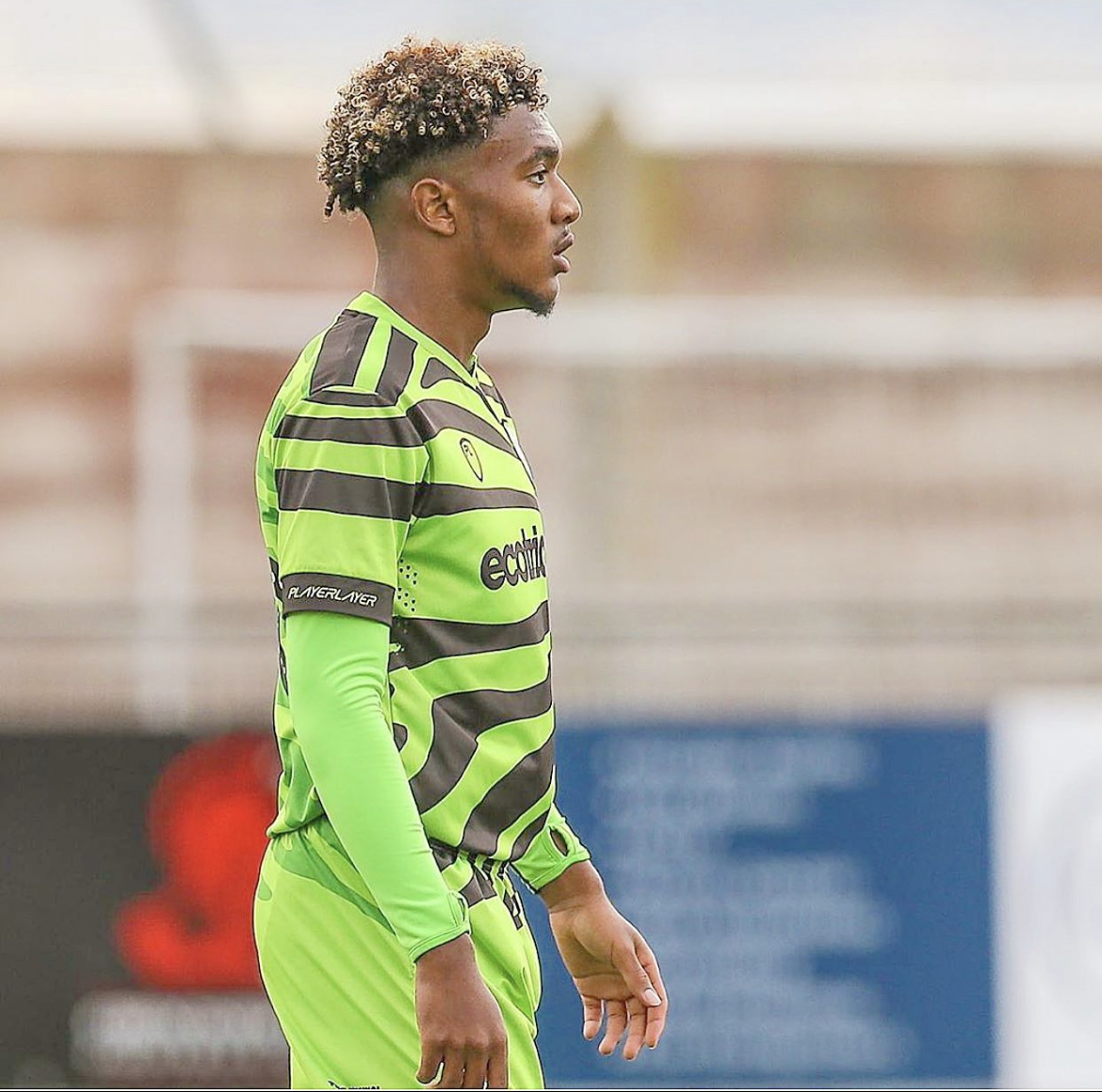
- Jonas with Forest Green Rovers

Personal information
- Full name: Isaiah Malachai Tayne Jones
- Date of birth: 21 September 2001 (age 25)
- Place of birth: Wandsworth, England
- Height: 1.83 m (6 ft 0 in)
- Position: Defender

Team information
- Current team: Chesham United
- Number: 2

Youth career
- 2014–2018: Southampton
- 2018–2020: Forest Green Rovers

Senior career*
Years	Team	Apps	(Gls)
2018–2020	Forest Green Rovers	2	(0)
2019	→ Cirencester Town (loan)	6	(1)
2021–2022	Chesham United	19	(1)
2022–2023	Kingstonian	13	(0)
2024–	Lewes	0	(0)
2024–	→ Phoenix Sports (loan)	1	(0)
- * Club domestic league appearances and goals as of 11:31, 15 October 2024 (UTC)

Isaiah Malachai Tayne Jones (born 21 September 2001) is an English professional footballer who plays as a defender for Phoenix Sports on loan from Lewes.

== Career ==
Isaiah Jones started his youth academy career at EFL Championship club Southampton F.C in 2014, where he stayed until 2018.

Jones would make the summer move up to Gloucestershire where he sign a two-year deal at Forest Green Rovers F.C in 2018, during the 2019–20 EFL Trophy, Jones made two appearances for Forest Green, against Southampton U21 and Walsall. In October 2019, Cirencester Town signed Jones on a one-month loan deal. On 12 October 2019, Jones scored on his debut for Cirencester, in a 3–2 FA Trophy defeat against Basingstoke Town.

In October 2024, Jones joined Phoenix Sports on loan.

== Career statistics ==
As of 9 December 2019

Appearances and goals by club, season and competition
Club	Season	League			FA Cup		League Cup		Other		Total	
Club	Season	Division	Apps	Goals	Apps	Goals	Apps	Goals	Apps	Goals	Apps	Goals
Forest Green Rovers	2019–20	League Two	0	0	0	0	0	0	2 (Note: Appearance(s) in EFL Trophy)	0	2	0
Career total			0	0	0	0	0	0	2	0	2	0
