= Isaiah Aram Minasian =

British violinist (born 1986)

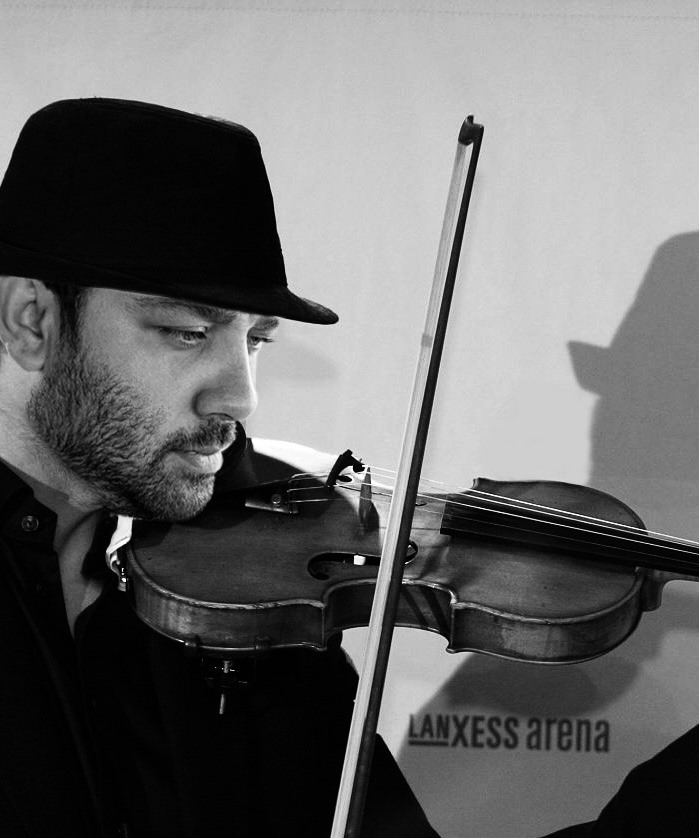
- Minasian at Lanxess Arena, Cologne, Germany, 2021

Background information
- Born: 28 February 1986 (age 40); Brighton, East Sussex, England
- Origin: British/Armenian
- Genres: Classical music
- Occupation: Musician
- Instruments: Violin, viola, cello
- Years active: 2004–present

Isaiah Aram Minasian (born 28 February 1986), is a British violinist, cellist and orchestrator.

== Biography ==
The Brightonian Minasian born to a musical family. His mother Maria Salari was a proficient violinist and cellist, his grandfather was a classical pianist. Minasian began playing violin on the training of his mother at a very early age. In year 2010, he moved to Paris and entered the Conservatoire National Superieur Musique de Paris in the masterclasses of Ami Flammer and Frederic Laroque, and concurrently attended courses of chamber music with Itamar Golan, Emmanuelle Bertrand and Philippe Bernold. Afterwards he continued his studies on music at Sorbonne school of Music and Musicology, where he was awarded to continue his studies at Juilliard School of music and dance, in New York City.

The year 2011 to 2014, he played with Orchestre philharmonique de Radio France conducted by Myung-whun Chung. Minasian was also the third assistant conductor of the Orchestre philharmonique de Radio France over two years. Meantime he was the master concert of Sorbonne Symphonic Orchestra in Paris.

In 2014, Minasian considered pursuing a doctorate level fellowship scholarship in Musical Arts (Violin, D.M.A.) at the Juilliard School, but passed it up in April 2015. He judged one of the highest priority instrumentalist's competitions in France "Le meilleur joueur de l'instrument à cordes" in April 2016.

After passing an inactive period in live appearances, Minasian began his performances in July 2016 with Radio France Philharmonic Orchestra in Amsterdam and Paris. He got the first honorary Offenbach Music Award for his solo violin and cello playing. Minasian had private performance with accompaniment Aleksey Igudesman to top Russian and Turkish government officials and got honorary award from Vladimir Putin, the president of Russia, in August 2016. The days after, he was chosen to be Moscow Symphonic Orchestra' soloist in the Victory Day celebration in Moscow.

He won the first prize of the International Jean Sibelius Violin Competition at Helsinki and the first prize in the Concours d'excellence Confédération Musicale de France as well.

Minasian got the honorary award "Ordre national de la Chevalier d'honneur" from Minister of Culture and Art after his performance at Commemoration of Paganini at Paris. Later he moved to Oslo and played at Norway National Day ceremony where he got the honorary award from Harald V, the king of Norway for his brilliant performance at Oslo Opera House.

He was the first recipient of the Long-Thibaud-Crespin International Competitions of violin soloists in Paris in 2014. First prize winner at the South Korea Symphony Orchestra Standard Life-OSM 2007 Competition, he was named Révélation Radio-BBC 2013–2014 in classical music, received the Lisker Music Foundation Award in 2011, and was chosen as Personality of the Week in La Presse, the Montreal newspaper in 2013, Isaiah was ranked amongst "CBC Radio's 30 Hot French classical musicians under 30".

He occasionally played as guest soloist at Moscow Philharmonic Orchestra, Oslo Philharmonic, Orchestre philharmonique de Radio France and the National Symphony Orchestra (in London).

Minasian is an orchestrator hired by composers and film production companies to arrange melodies for orchestras or film scores. He arranges melodies for orchestras including the Moscow Symphony Orchestra, Russian National Orchestra, Orchestre philharmonique de Radio France, Oslo Philharmonic orchestra, and Royal Philharmonic Orchestra.

He plays on a "Pietro Antonio Dalla Costa" violin from Treviso dated 1763 and one labelled as "Antonius Stradivarius Cremonensis" dated 1726 (£1.000,000). along with a "G.B. Guadagnini" violin loaned to him by Museo del Violino in 2019.

Minasian is currently composer-in-residence at the Seoul Philharmonic Orchestra, South Korea. He is selected as the musical ambassadors of peace and headed to Vancouver, Canada, to select talented musicians through auditions in UBC school of music.

== Education ==
- 2008 B.A Fine arts Tehran University of Art, Iran
- 2010 M.A Pittura e arti visive, Accademia di Belle Arti di Firenze, Florence, Italy
- 2013, DNSPM of Music and Musicology. L'Universite Paris-Sorbonne(Paris IV), Paris, France
- 2014, withdrawn student of doctorate in musical arts (violin, D.M.A.) Juilliard School, New York, United States

== Awards ==
- 2007, 2nd prize at the 9th Beijing Music Festival BMF in Beijing, China.
- 2007, 1st prize winner at the South Korea Symphony Orchestra Standard Life-OSM.
- 2008, 2nd prize at the International Foundation "Parnassus" in Paris, France.
- 2011, 1st prize Norwegian Soloists MMES Oslo, Norway.
- 2011, 3rd prize in Cello playing at Lisker Music Foundation, London, UK.
- 2013, won the full scholarship for violin soloist of Juilliard Music School.
- 2014, 3rd prize at Long-Thibaud-Crespin International Competitions of violin soloists in Paris, France.
- 2014, honorary award of cello playing from Conservatorium van Amsterdam, Netherlands.
- 2014, 1st award for cello ensemble playing at BBC Young Musician Contest (BBC Radio 3 and BBC Four), Edinburgh, UK.
- 2014, award of top 20 cellists at International Rostropovich Cello Competition (in memorial of Pablo Casals) Paris, France.
- 2014, semi-finalist of violinists at Concours Jeunes-Artistes de Radio-France (France Musique) Paris, France.
- 2014, recipient of the Long-Thibaud-Crespin International Competitions of violin soloists in Paris, France.
- 2015, selected as laureate of the 2015–2016 Classe d'Excellence de violoncelle Gautier Capuçon from the Fondation Louis Vuitton, Paris, France.
- 2015, the 2015 Men's Musical Club of Paris Career Development Award, France.
- 2016, 1st "Offenbach Music Award" for violin and cello, Paris, France.
- 2016, honorary award from Vladimir Putin, the president of Russia.
- 2016, 1st award Jean Sibelius Violin Competition, Helsinki. Finland
- 2016, 1st award Concours d'excellence Confédération Musicale de France, Paris.
- 2017, honorary award "Ordre national de la Chevalier d'honneur" from Minister of Culture and Art, Paris, France.
- 2017, honorary award from Harald V, the king of Norway for his brilliant performance. Oslo Opera House, Norway
- 2018, honorary award "best orchestration Russian traditional music" from Russia Minister of Culture and Art, Moscow, Russia
- 2018, 50 best British Musicians award by BBC Music Magazine. London, UK
- 2019, honorary award "La 26e des Victoires de la Musique Classique". Paris, France
- 2020, ABO Best Classical Music Orchestration Award of the Year, London, UK
- 2021, nominated as Best Classical Artist of Global Awards, Global’s radio stations, Classic FM, LBC, Heart, Kusc. London, UK
- 2022, 1st award of ABO best orchestration for radio orchestral music, BBC Radio 3, London, UK
- 2022, best orchestration award, Vienna State Opera, Vienna, Austria
- 2023, nominated for best achievement award ICMA (International Classical Music Awards), Wroclaw, Poland
