= Isaiah Ntshangase =

South African politician (1966–2001)

Member of the National Assembly
- In office June 1999 – February 2001
- Constituency: KwaZulu-Natal

Personal details
- Born: Isaiah Boy Ntshangase; 1 April 1966 Pongola, Natal Province; South Africa
- Died: February 2001 (aged 34)
- Party: African National Congress

Isaiah Boy Ntshangase (1 April 1966 – February 2001) was a South African politician who represented the African National Congress (ANC) in the National Assembly from 1999 until his death in 2001. A lionised figure in the ANC Youth League, he was provincial chairperson of the league's KwaZulu-Natal branch from 1996 to 2000. Before that, he was an activist in the South African Youth Congress.

== Life and career ==
Ntshangase was born on 1 April 1966 in Pongola in the north of the former Natal Province. He was an activist in the South African Youth Congress and served as provincial chairperson of the ANC Youth League in KwaZulu-Natal from 1996 to 2000.

While in his youth league office, Ntshangase was elected to the National Assembly in the 1999 general election; he joined the ANC's KwaZulu-Natal caucus. He remained in his seat until his death in February 2001. His seat was later filled by Albertina Luthuli.

== Memorials ==
In 2008, Walter Gilbert Street in eThekwini was renamed Isaiah Ntshangase Road. Nathi Mthethwa addressed a memorial lecture held in his honour in 2019.
