= Judensau =

Antisemitic visual motif in Central Europe

A Judensau (German for "Jews' sow") is a folk art image of Jews in obscene contact with a large sow (female pig), which in Judaism is an unclean animal. These first appeared in the 13th century in Germany and some other European countries, and remained popular for over 600 years.

== Background and images ==
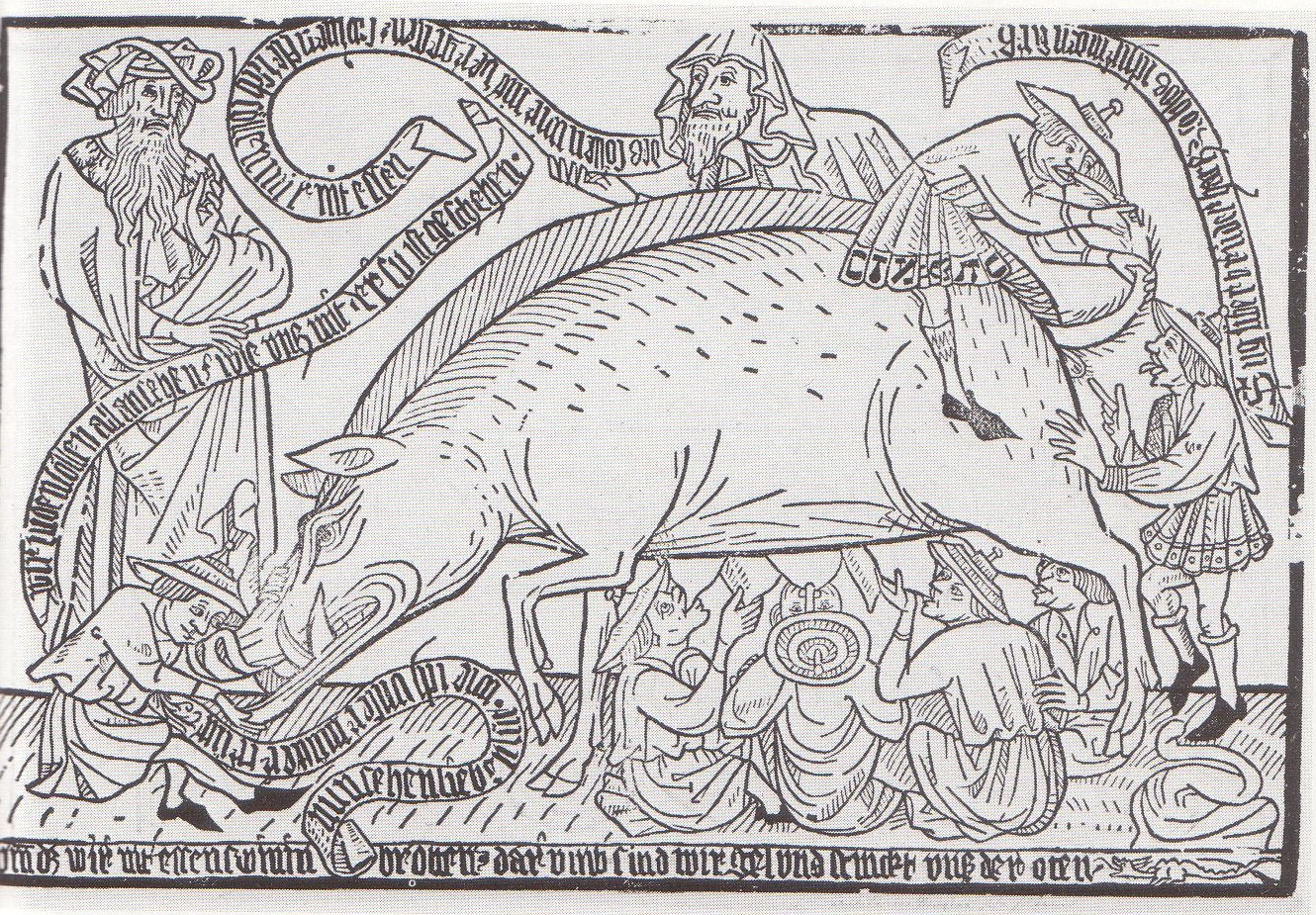
Woodcut in the collection of the Staatliche Graphische Sammlung München, c. 1470, showing a Judensau. Jews, identified by their headwear (Judenhut), are suckling from a pig and eating its excrement. The banderoles display rhymes mocking the Jews.

The Jewish prohibition against eating pork comes from Torah, in the Book of Leviticus Chapter 11, verses 2 through 8. The arrangement of Jews surrounding, suckling, and having intercourse with the animal (sometimes regarded as the devil), is a mockery of Judaism.

The image appears in the Middle Ages, mostly in carvings on church or cathedral walls, often outside where it could be seen from the street (for example at Wittenberg and Regensburg), but also in other forms. The earliest appearance seems to be on the underside of a wooden choir-stall seat in Cologne Cathedral, dating to about 1210. The earliest example in stone dates to ca. 1230 and is located in the cloister of the cathedral at Brandenburg. In about 1470 the image appeared in woodcut form, and thereafter was often copied in popular prints, often with antisemitic commentary. A wall painting on the bridge tower of Frankfurt am Main, constructed between 1475 and 1507 near the gateway to the Jewish ghetto and demolished in 1801, was an especially notorious example and included a scene of the ritual murder of Simon of Trent.

== Judensau in Wittenberg ==
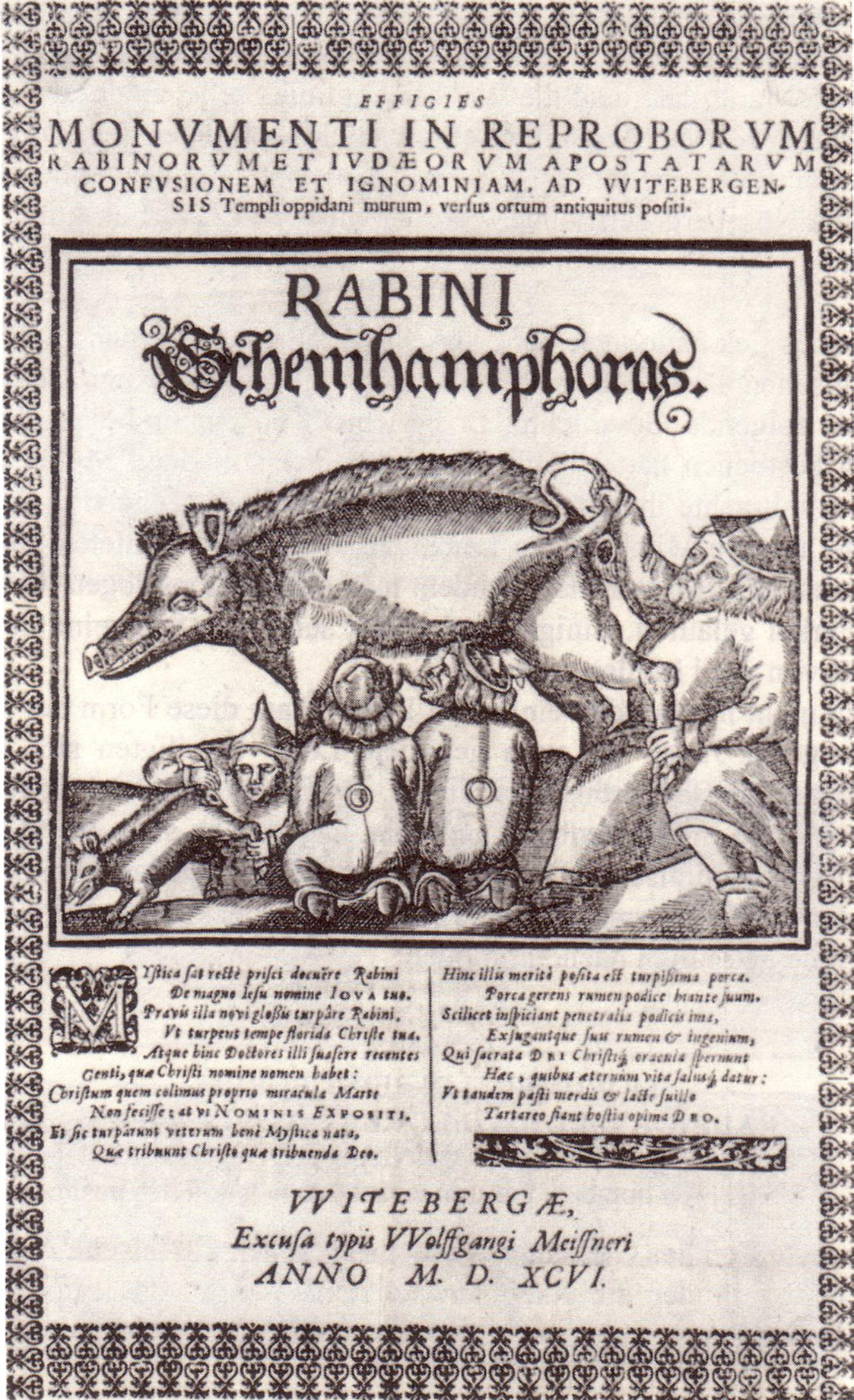
The Judensau at Wittenberg

The city of Wittenberg contains a Judensau from 1305, on the façade of the Stadtkirche, the church where Martin Luther preached. It portrays a rabbi who looks under the sow's tail, and other Jews drinking from its teats. An inscription reads "Rabini Schem HaMphoras", Latin (in German orthography) for "Shem HaMephorash of the Rabbi", mocking the Tetragram to be a pig. The sculpture is one of the last remaining examples in Germany of medieval "Jew baiting". In 1988, on the occasion of the 50th anniversary of the Kristallnacht, debate sprung up about the monument, which resulted in the addition of a sculpture recognizing that during the Holocaust six million Jews were murdered "under the sign of the cross".

In Vom Schem Hamphoras (1543), Luther comments on the Judensau sculpture at Wittenberg, echoing the antisemitism of the image and locating the Talmud in the sow's bowels:

Here on our church in Wittenberg a sow is sculpted in stone. Young pigs and Jews lie suckling under her. Behind the sow a rabbi is bent over the sow, lifting up her right leg, holding her tail high and looking intensely under her tail and into her Talmud, as though he were reading something acute or extraordinary, which is certainly where they get their Shemhamphoras.

In July 2016, Dr. Richard Harvey, a Messianic (Christian) theologian from the United Kingdom, initiated a petition on Change.org to have the Wittenberg Judensau removed.

In 2018, Michael Düllmann, a member of Berlin's Jewish community, sued to have the sculpture removed as defamatory. In February 2020, the district court of Dessau and the Higher Regional Court in Naumburg rejected the claim, though the petitioner vowed to appeal to higher courts. The Lutheran church and some historians, such as Michael Wolffsohn, have also debated whether the sculpture should be removed for being antisemitic or whether doing so would whitewash the church's historical antisemitism. The legal debate continued for some time.

In June 2022, a German federal court of appeal sided with the lower courts, ruling that while the sculpture itself is disparaging to Jews if viewed in isolation, "the legal system does not demand its removal", suggesting that other means (such as a memorial plaque explaining the history of the sculpture) are better suited to address the issue.

== Partial list ==
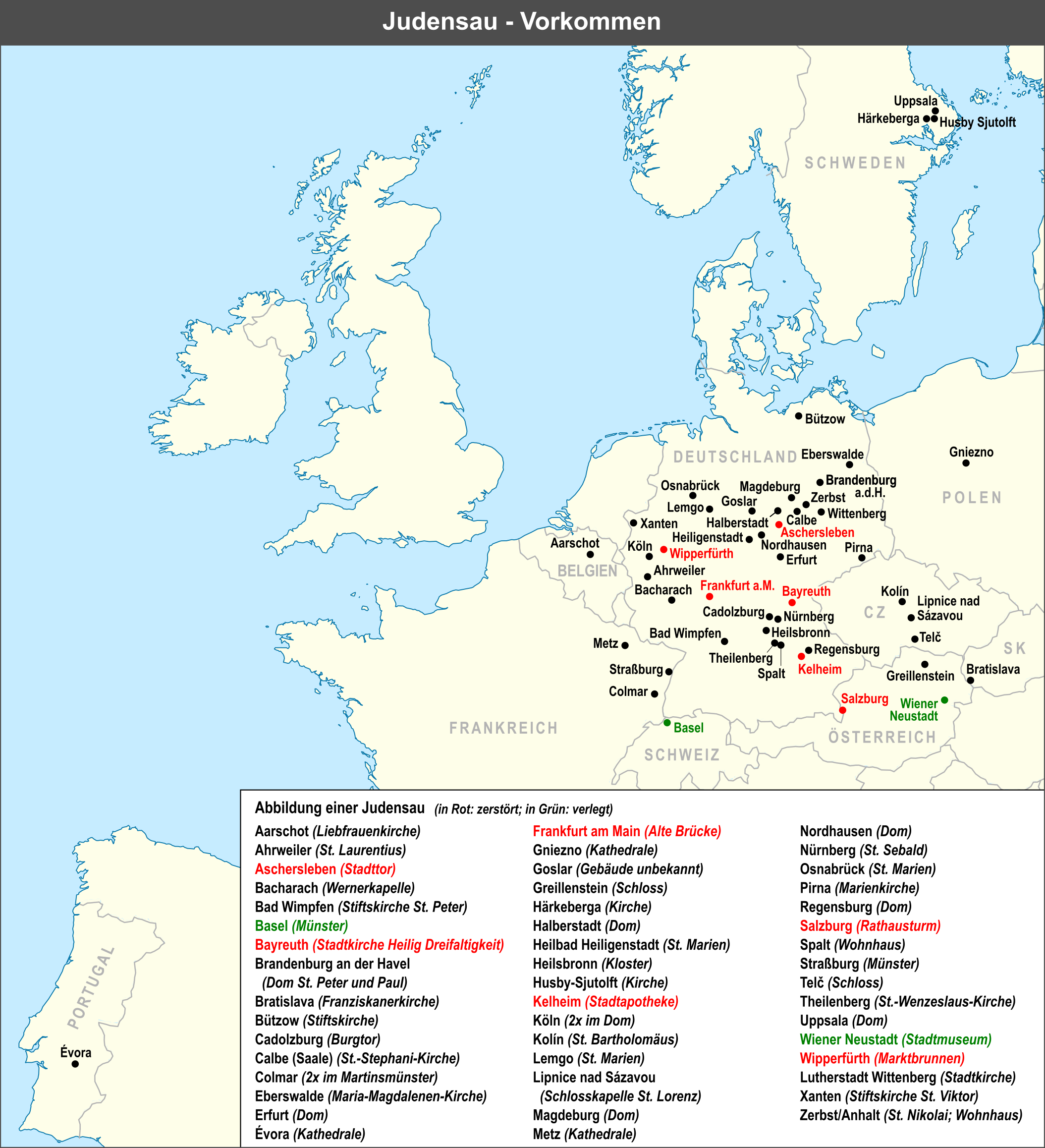
Map listing (in German) the presence of Judensau images on churches of central Europe; in red, the ones that were removed

Some of these sculptures can be found at some churches today.

- Aarschot in Belgium (Our Lady Church)
- Basel in Switzerland (Cathedral)
- Brandenburg (Cathedral)
- Cadolzburg
- Colmar in France at (Église Saint-Martin – 2 representations)
- Cologne (Judensau at the choir stalls of Cathedral – probably the earliest example, and in Church of St. Severin)
- Eberswalde
- Erfurt (Cathedral)
- Heilsbronn (Cathedral)
- Gniezno (Cathedral)
- Lemgo (St. Marien)
- Magdeburg (Cathedral)
- Metz in France (Cathedral)
- Nuremberg (St. Sebaldus Church)
- Regensburg (Cathedral)
- Remagen (Gate post)
- Strasbourg (Cathedral, on capital)
- Uppsala in Sweden (Cathedral)
- Wiener Neustadt in Austria
- Wimpfen (Church of St. Peter)
- Wittenberg (Town church)
- Xanten (Cathedral)
- Zerbst (St. Nicolas Church)

== Gallery ==
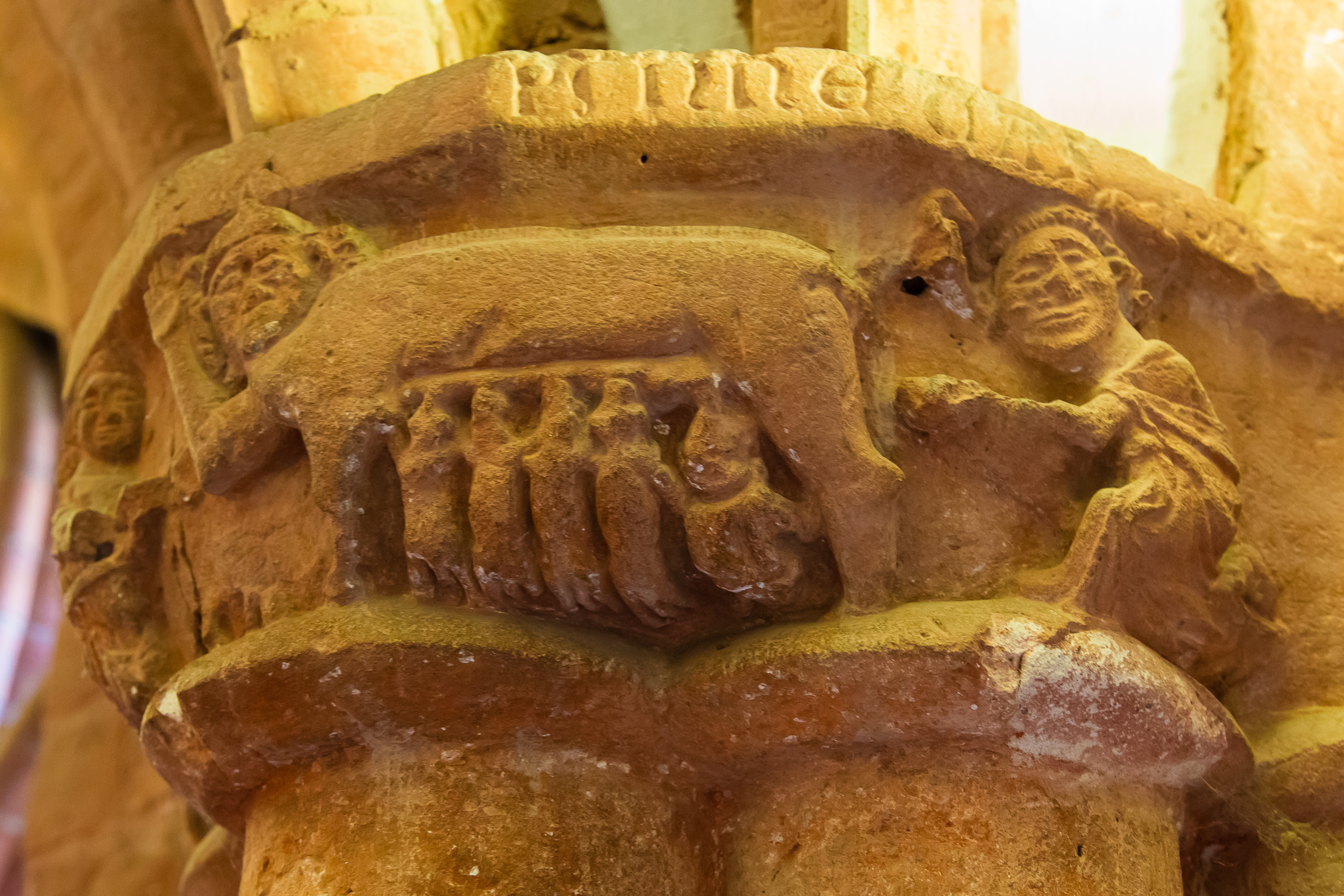
Judensau at the Cathedral of Brandenburg

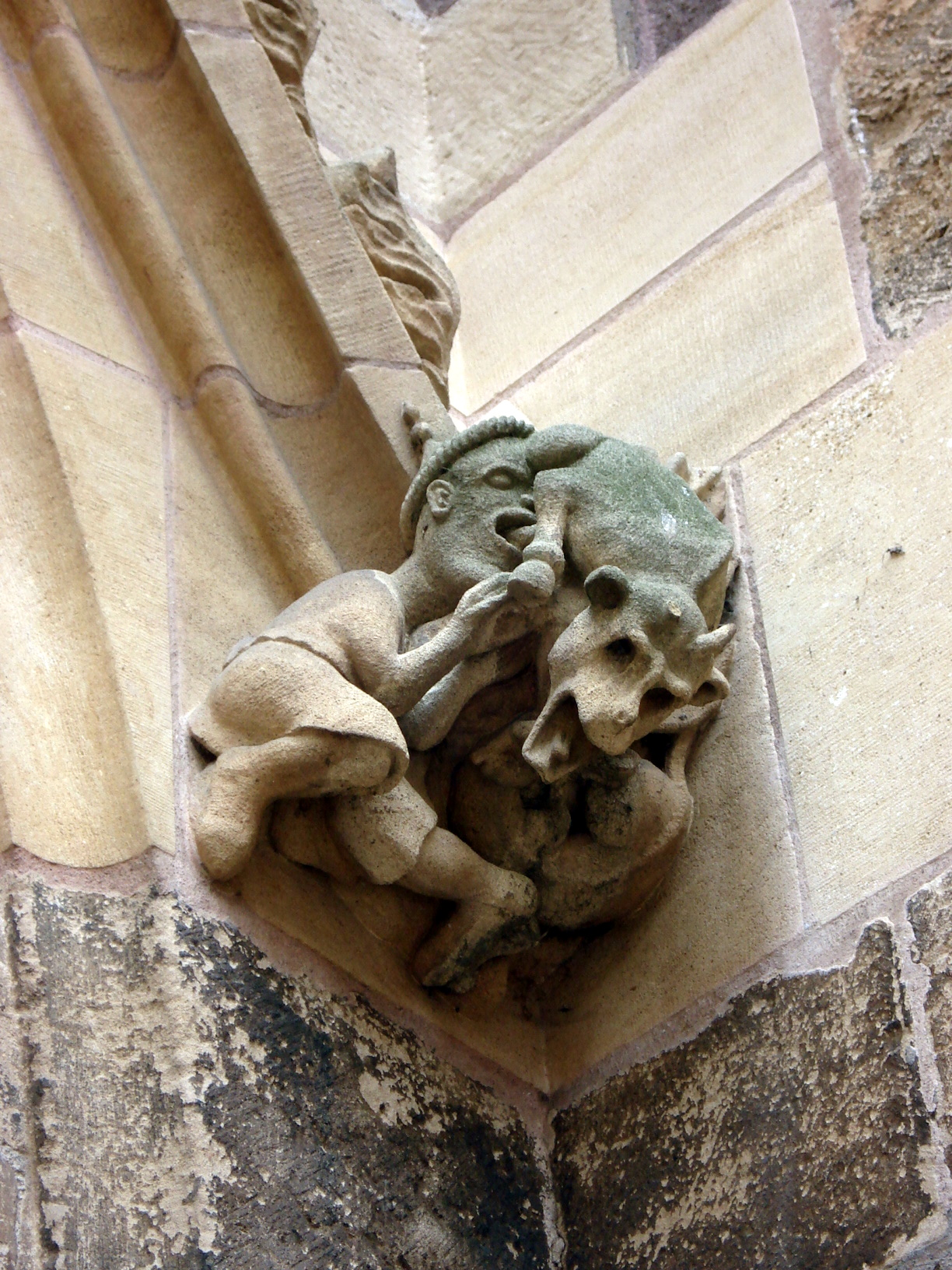
Judensau on the Cathedral of St. Martin in Colmar

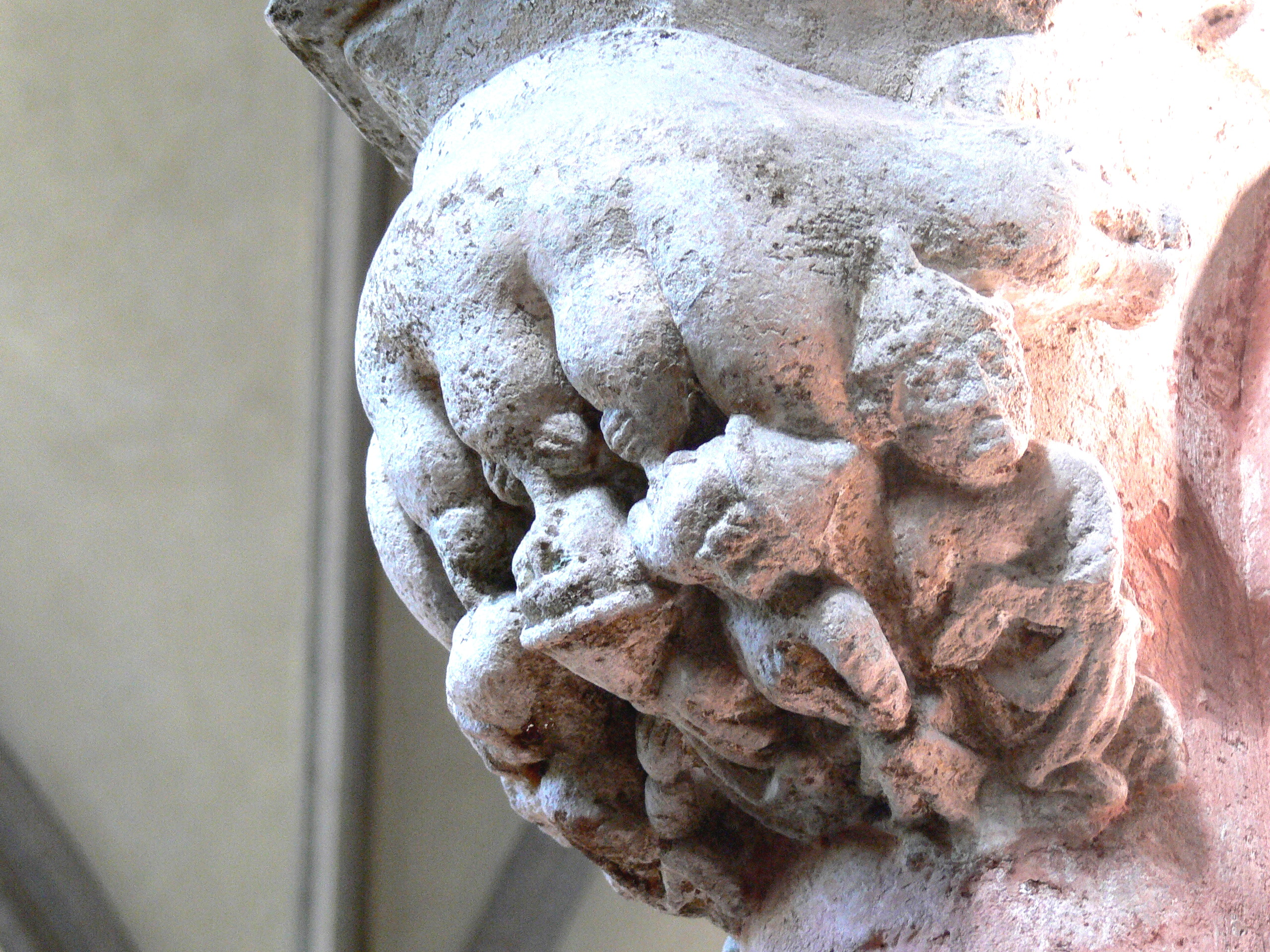
Judensau on the Cathedral in Heilsbronn

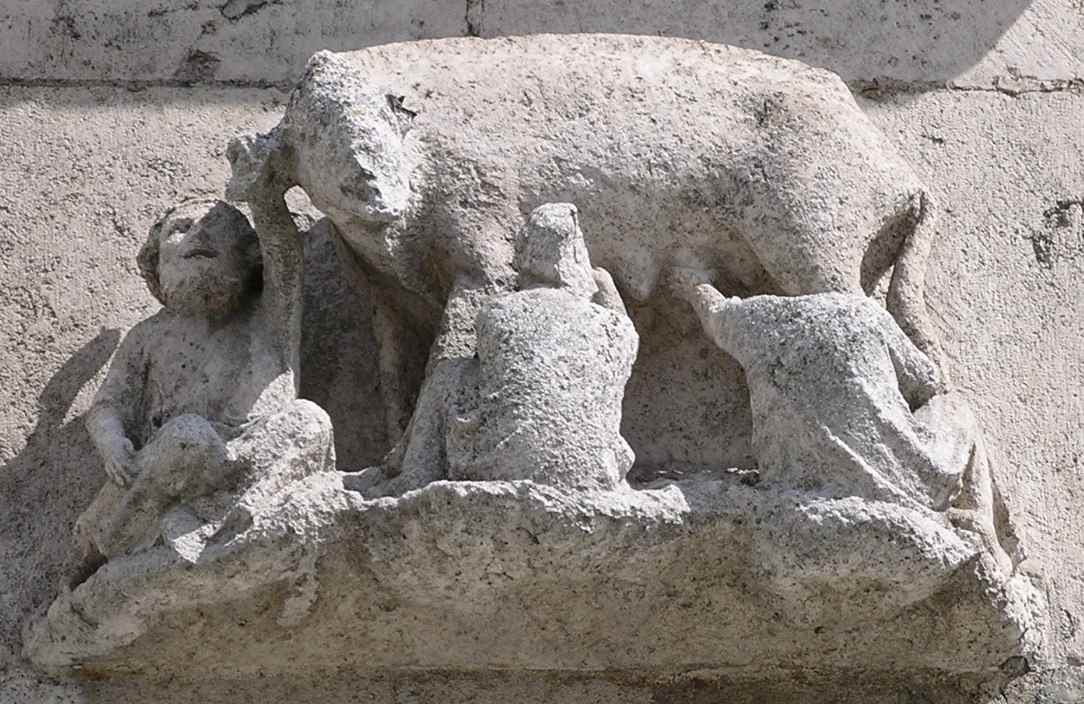
Judensau at the Cathedral of St. Peter in Regensburg

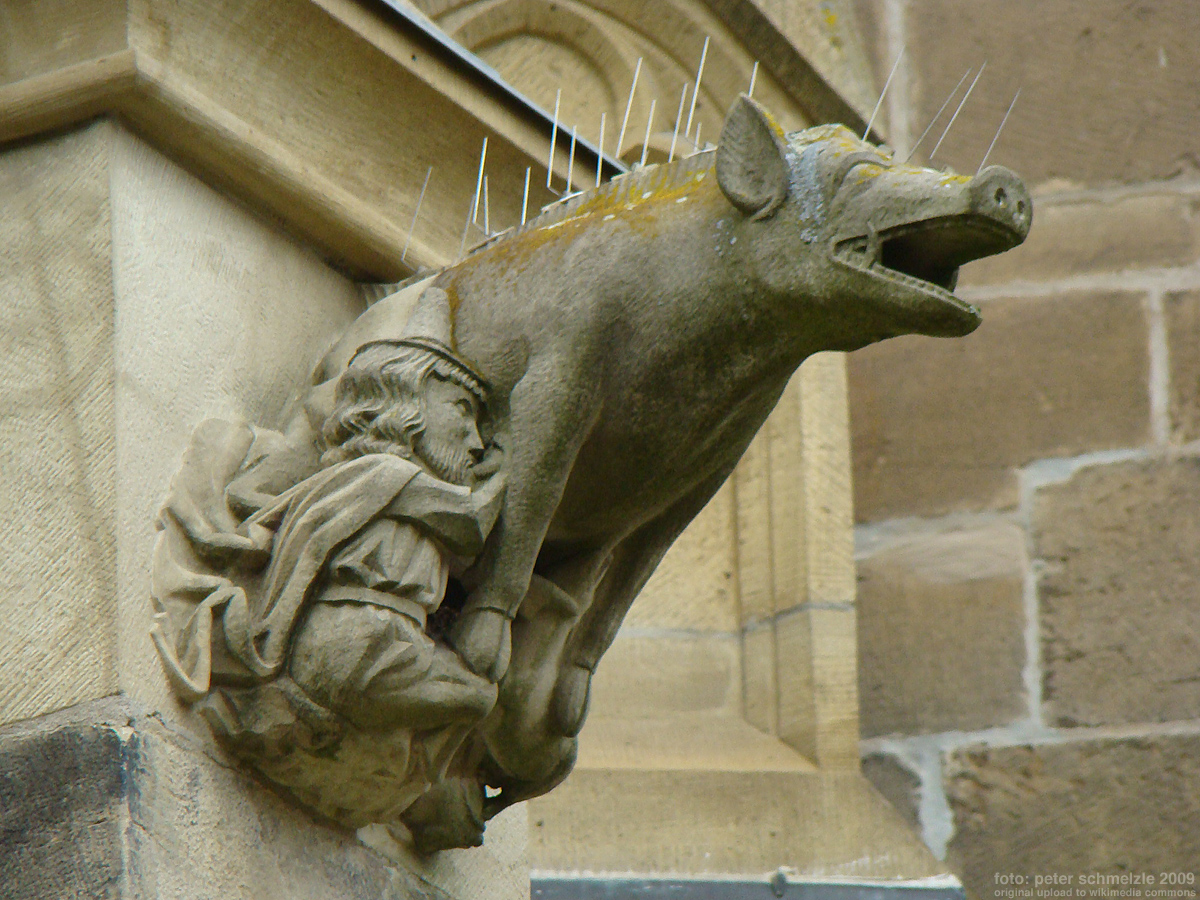
Judensau at the minster in Wimpfen

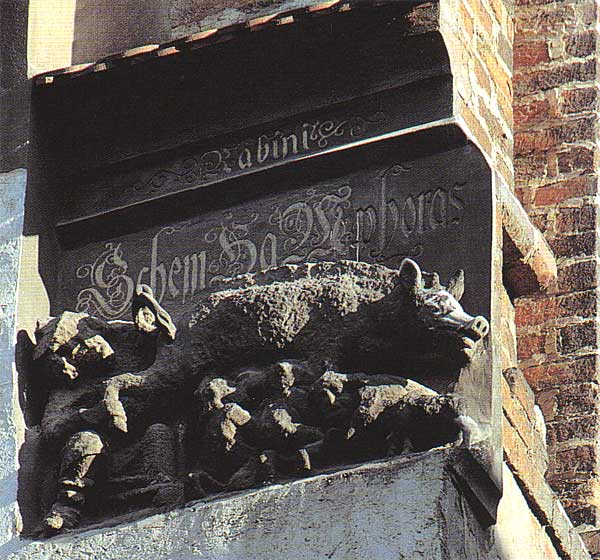
Judensau on the Wittenberg Parish Church, cited by Luther

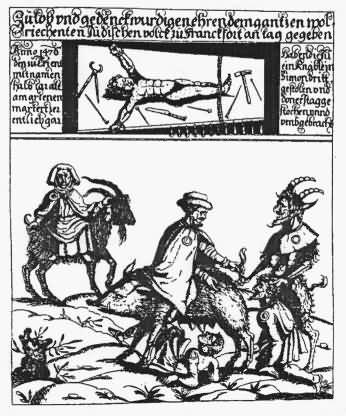
Woodcut of the Bridge Tower at Frankfurt, showing martyrdom of Simon of Trent above a Judensau

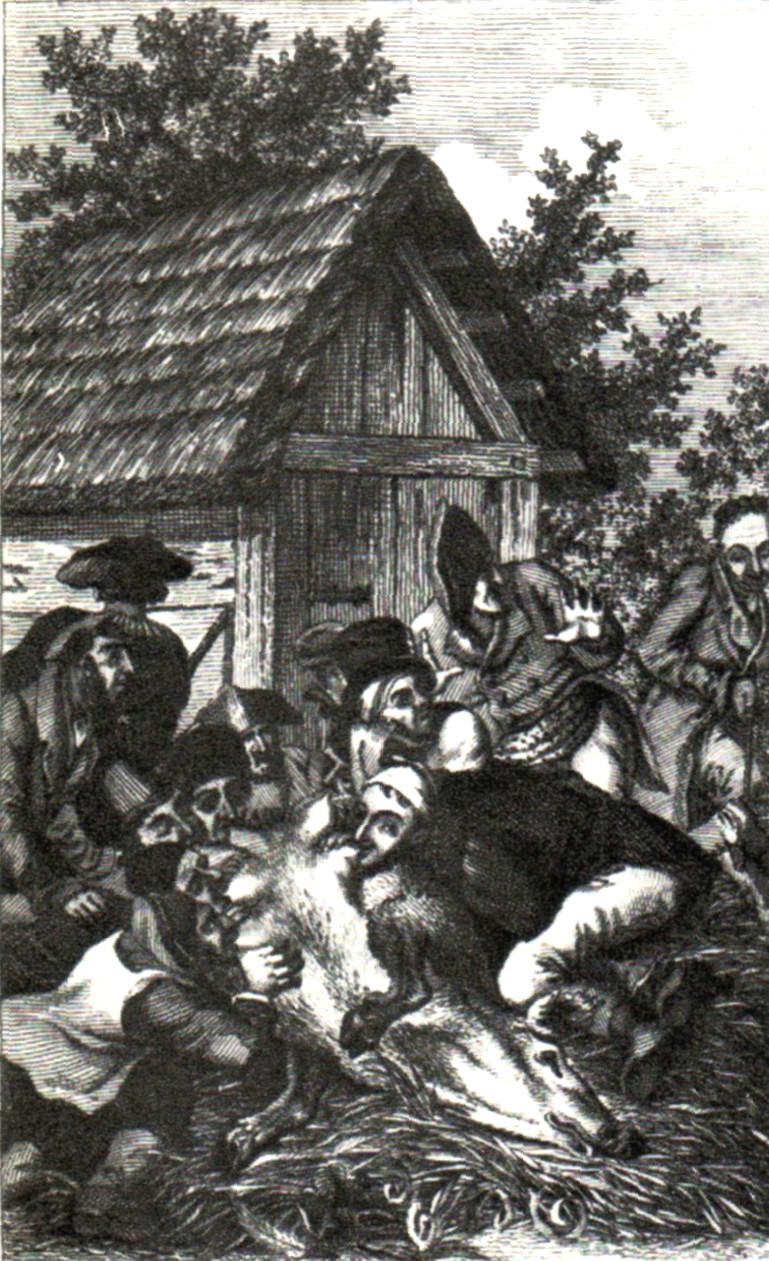
Frontispiece of book Die Judenschule by Hartwig von Hundt-Radowsky, Aarau 1822

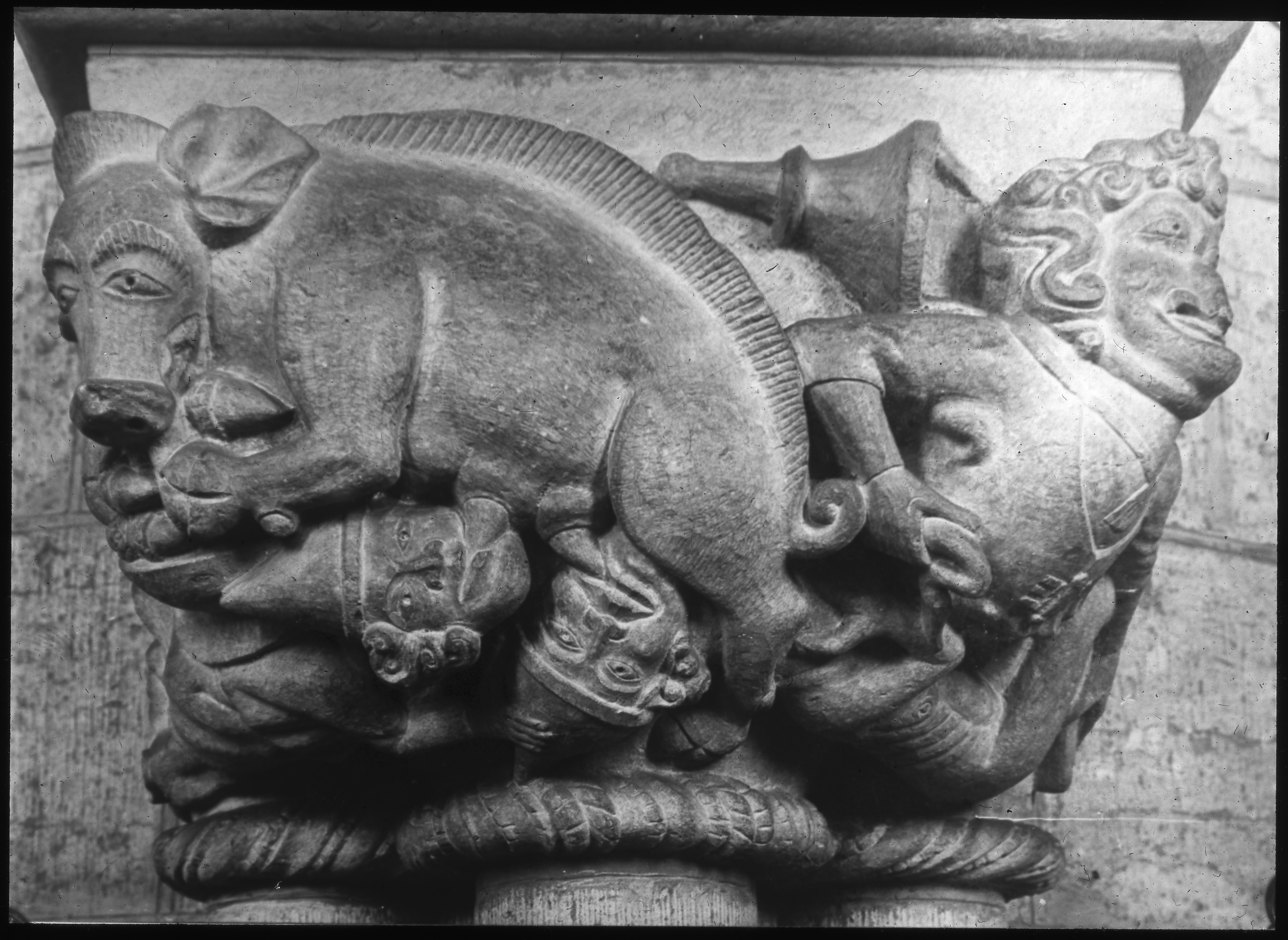
Judensau at Uppsala Cathedral in Sweden

== See also ==
- Judensau at the choir stalls of Cologne Cathedral
- History of antisemitism
- Luther and antisemitism
- Marrano
- Jew with a coin
- Osculum infame, the supposed kissing of the devil's hindparts by Satan-worshippers.
