= Isaías D'Oleo Ochoa =

Costa Rican philologist, poet and editor

- Born: Isaias Doleo Ochoa; December 23, 1980
- Education: University of Costa Rica; School of Philology, Linguistics and Literature
- Occupations: Philologist, Poet, Editor
- Writing career
- Period: 2004-present
- Genre: Poetry
- Website: isaiasdoleo.com

Isaías D'Oleo Ochoa (alternatively spelled Isaias Doleo Ochoa) (born December 23, 1980) is a Costa Rican philologist, poet and editor.

== Life and education ==
Isaias grew up in San José, Costa Rica, and has been writing for most of his life. After high school, he attended the University of Costa Rica where he received a Bachelor of Arts degree in Spanish Studies in 2004. Currently, Isaias lives in a small town in Costa Rica, focusing on his poetry and projects. He splits his time among being an editor, teacher, and poet. He can be found in several social networks where he frequently keeps in touch with his audience.

== Draft Bills ==
He is best known for his contribution to Philology when he proposed to the Legislative Assembly of Costa Rica a draft bill to create the Costa Rican Philologists Association (Spanish: Colegio Costarricense de Filólogos). This project was later supported by congressman Oscar López Arias (2006–2010) who studied Doleo's draft bill and commented about the draft's merit in order to introduce it as a proposed law in May 2008, sending the bill to the Government Printing Office. Costa Rican Philologists Association Project is one of the 75 of 1008 initiatives presented by Costa Rican citizens that has become proposed laws since 1999.

== Poetry ==
His poetry is usually short, but it serves as complete thoughts unto themselves. His work reflects the influences of William Blake, Robert Louis Stevenson, Robert Burns, Rubén Darío, and Pablo Neruda. His bilingual poems (English-Spanish) have appeared in a variety of poetry publications and are characterized by their originality and imagery, exhibiting sensibility, faith, and hope.

== Books (Poetry) ==
- D'Oleo Ochoa, Isaías (2009). Unsaid Words of My Life. CreateSpace. ISBN 978-1-4486-6288-3. Retrieved 2010-05-09.
- D'Oleo Ochoa, Isaías (2010). Soul Tattoo: A Bilingual Edition. CreateSpace. ISBN 978-1-4486-7672-9. Retrieved 2011-07-13.
- D'Oleo Ochoa, Isaías (2010). Tatuaje Del Alma. CreateSpace. ISBN 978-1-4635-4466-9. Retrieved 2011-07-13.
