= Isaiah Rice =

American photographer (1917–1980)

Isaiah Rice (1917 – 1980) was an American photographer whose photographs document the people and neighborhoods of Asheville in western North Carolina. Rice is credited with providing some of the few known representations of Black Appalachian communities from a Black Appalachian perspective.

== Biography ==
Rice was born in Asheville, North Carolina, and attended Stephens-Lee High School. He worked for the Works Progress Administration (WPA) during the Great Depression. Rice served in World War II and was a member of St. Paul's Missionary Baptist Church in West Asheville. He died in 1980 from a heart attack.

== Photographs ==
Rice's photographs include family and friends, his church, schoolchildren, pets, still lifes, portraits, parades, street life, and men and women at work. Rice has been described as an "urban folk photographer" because he documented everyday events and people in his community.

In 2015, Rice's daughter, Mrs. Marian Rice Waters, and his grandson, Darin Waters, Ph.D. donated a collection of Rice's photographs to UNC Asheville's Special Collections to be digitized, archived, and selectively exhibited. The online collection is available through UNC Asheville's Special Collections "Isaiah Rice Photograph Collection." The collection highlights communities of Asheville, NC, such as Burton Street and Shiloh. According to Waters, "the collection demonstrates the African-American experience through the eyes of a 'very middle-class,' forward-thinking family."
