= Isaiah, California =

Isaiah
- Former settlement
- Location in California
- Coordinates: 39°43′04″N 121°26′32″W
- Country: United States
- State: California
- County: Butte
- Elevation: 980 ft (300 m)

Isaiah is a ghost town in Butte County, California, United States. It was located 5.5 miles (8.9 km) north-northwest of Berry Creek, at an elevation of 984 feet (300 m). Part of the Bidwell Tract of 1876, it still appeared on maps as of 1948. Isaiah began as a mining community and later was used as a watering station for steam powered trains. Because of the construction of Oroville Dam (1961), the railroad was re-directed. This led to the inhabitants eventually selling their property. It is now privately owned.

A post office operated at Isaiah from 1919 to 1943 and from 1947 to 1954.
