= Isaiah Sellers =

- Born: 1802; Ohio, United States
- Died: 1864 (aged 61–62)
- Occupations: Editor; journalist
- Known for: Editing the Scientific American (1845–1846)

Isaiah Sellers (c. 1802–1864) was the riverboat captain from whom Samuel L. Clemens (Mark Twain) claimed to have appropriated the pen name Mark Twain.

The story of how Clemens started to use the name is told in chapter 50 of Life on the Mississippi and is summarized in the main article on Mark Twain. He allegedly wrote articles for the New Orleans Daily Picayune. Since there are a few problems with the chronology of Sellers' death and Clemens' first use of the name, the story is not accepted uncritically by Twain scholars. Captain Isaiah Sellers is buried at Bellefontaine Cemetery in St. Louis, Missouri.
