= Isaiah Shachar =

Israeli historian (1935–1977)

- ישעיהו שחר
- Born: 6 August 1935; Haifa, Mandatory Palestine
- Died: 19 September 1977 (aged 42)
- Other names: 'Yishai
- Occupation: Israeli historian

Yeshayahu Shachar (Hebrew: ישעיהו שחר; born Yeshayahu Stengel), also Isaiah or "Ishay" Shachar (6 August 1935, in Haifa, Mandatory Palestine – 19 September 1977), was an Israeli historian, that specialized in Eastern European Jewry and early Hasidic philosophy.

== Biography ==
Yeshayahu Stengel (later Shacher) studied European and Jewish history at Hebrew University of Jerusalem. His 1963 master's thesis was entitled Criticism of the Jewish community and Its Leadership in the Hasidic and Non-Hasidic Literature of Eighteenth century Poland—A Comparative Study (in Hebrew, 66 pages, 1964).

Shachar later became a junior research fellow at the Warburg Institute (University of London) where he worked on a doctoral dissertation under the supervision of professor E. H. Gombrich (which was finished 1967). It was published in his main work: The Judensau: A Medieval Anti-Jewish Motif and Its History, Warburg Institute Surveys, 5 (London, 1974). He also edited the catalogue of the Feuchtwanger Collection of Judaica at the Israel Museum, Jerusalem (Jerusalem, 1981), and published several miscellaneous monographs, including one establishing the authenticity of the personal seal of Nachmanides (found in a field in Israel). His interests included the early history of Hasidism; Jewish iconography and portraiture, and Jewish/Hebrew bibliography. He held teaching posts at Hebrew University and University College London, and at the Oxford Centre for Postgraduate Hebrew Studies.

He died in 1977, and his personal library was auctioned at Sotheby's (1980). Later, a memorial volume commemorating his life and works was edited by Clare Moore in 1993: The Visual Dimension: Aspects of Jewish Art (Westview Press, 1993).
