= Isaiah L. Lyons =

American politician (1843–1871)

Isaiah L. Lyons (August 1843 – February 21, 1871) was an American politician.

Isaiah L. Lyons was born in Monmouth, New Jersey, to parents George and Mary E. Lyons in August 1843. He was raised in Williamsburg, Brooklyn, New York. Aged 11, Lyons started working in a physician's office before becoming a pharmaceutical clerk. In September 1863, Lyons enlisted in the 6th Infantry Regiment of the United States Colored Troops, and was sent to Virginia. He fell ill with typhoid fever and malaria in August 1864, and spent the majority of his active military service in hospital. After leaving the military in September 1865, Lyons was hired as a steward at Freedman's Hospital in Hampton. He worked at the hospital for two years before establishing his own drug store. Lyons was elected to the Virginia Senate in 1869, defeating a white candidate, Martin McDevitt, and becoming one of the first African Americans to serve on the Virginia General Assembly. A Republican, Lyons represented Brunswick County, Virginia and Lunenburg County, Virginia until his death in office on February 21, 1871. Following his death, Lyons' remains were interred at Union Cemetery in Brooklyn, then moved to Cedar Grove Cemetery in Queens between 1897 and 1898.

== See also ==
- African American officeholders from the end of the Civil War until before 1900
