= Isaiah Johnson =

Isaiah Johnson may refer to:

- Isaiah Johnson (safety, born May 1992), NFL safety who played college at Georgia Tech
- Isaiah Johnson (safety, born October 1992), NFL safety who played college at Kansas and South Carolina
- Isaiah Johnson (cornerback, born 1995), NFL cornerback who played college at Houston
- Isaiah Johnson (cornerback, born 2000), NFL cornerback who played college at Syracuse and Dartmouth
- Isaiah Johnson (basketball) (born 1994), American basketball player
