= Isaiah Thomas =

Isaiah or Isiah Thomas may refer to:

== Sportsmen ==
- Isiah Thomas (born 1961), American retired Hall of Fame basketball player and coach
- Isaiah Thomas (basketball) (born 1989), American basketball player
- Isiah Thomas (boxer) (born 1989), American boxer
- Isaiah Thomas (American football) (born 1998), American football player

== Other people ==
- Isaiah Thomas (publisher) (1749–1831), American revolutionary-era publisher and author
- Isaiah Thomas (politician) (born 1984), American politician
