= Isiah Williams (disambiguation) =

Isiah Williams may refer to:

- Juice Williams (born 1987), American football quarterback
- Ike Williams (1923–1994), American professional boxer
- Isiah Williams (basketball), American basketball player
