= Lauderdale County School District (Tennessee) =

School district in Tennessee, United States

Address
- 321 Armory Avenue Ripley, Tennessee, 38063; United States

District information
- Type: Public
- Grades: PreK–12
- NCES District ID: 4702310

Students and staff
- Students: 3,716
- Teachers: 266.01
- Staff: 285.01
- Student–teacher ratio: 13.97

Other information
- Website: www.lced.net

Lauderdale County School District or Lauderdale County Schools is a school district headquartered in Ripley, Tennessee.

All parts of Lauderdale County are in the school district.

== Schools ==
High schools

- Halls High School
- Ripley High School

Middle/junior high schools

- Halls Junior High School
- Ripley Middle School

Elementary schools

- Halls Elementary School
- Ripley Elementary School
- Ripley Primary School

Alternative school

- Alternative Learning Academy
