= Saint Isaiah (disambiguation) =

Saint Isaiah was an Israelite prophet who is the main figure in the biblical Book of Isaiah and venerated in Christianity as a saint.

Saint Isaiah or Saint Isaias may also refer to:

- Isaiah of Gaza (died 491), Christian ascetic, abbot and writer
- Isaiah of Rostov (1062–1089/1090), Russian Orthodox missionary and bishop
- Isaiah of Onogošt (died early 17th century), Serbian Orthodox hermit
