= Isaiah Rose =

American politician (1843–1916)

Member of the Ohio Senate
- In office January 1, 1906 – January 1, 1909

Sheriff of Washington County, Ohio
- In office 1885–1889

Personal details
- Born: June 26, 1843 Belmont County, Ohio, U.S.
- Died: November 26, 1916 (aged 73) Coal Run, Ohio, U.S.
- Resting place: Round Bottom Cemetery, Coal Run, Ohio
- Party: Republican
- Spouse: Melissa Ellen Crawford
- Children: 7
- Relatives: Kelly Clarkson (great-great-great granddaughter)
- Military career
- Allegiance: United States
- Branch: Union Army
- Service years: 1861–1865
- Rank: Private
- Units: 18th Ohio Infantry Regiment, Company K (May–August 1861); 63rd Ohio Infantry Regiment, Company F (December 1861–May 1865)
- Conflicts: American Civil War: Battle of Atlanta (POW)

Isaiah R. Rose (June 26, 1843 – November 26, 1916) was a Republican state senator for Ohio, a Washington County sheriff and a Union Civil War veteran.

== Early life ==
Rose was born on June 26, 1843, in Belmont County, Ohio, the son of Mary (Schaffer) and James H. Rose.

== Civil War ==
Rose enrolled twice as a soldier for the Union Army, and served alongside his brother Thompson. He was captured in July 1864 after staying to comfort his brother after he was mortally wounded, and was transported to Andersonville Prison as a prisoner. He later escaped in December after having made two previous attempts and returned to his former army. However, he was mistaken for a Confederate soldier or scout and was shot in the left leg in January 1865. This injury left him permanently disabled.

== Public office ==
Rose returned to Ohio and, after working as a coal digger in the 1870s, was elected sheriff for Washington County as a member of the Republican Party in 1884, and subsequently as a state senator in 1905. During his career in the Ohio Senate, he was a champion of the temperance movement in Ohio, introducing ultimately successful legislation allowing individual counties to enact local legislation banning the sale of liquor.

== Personal life ==
Rose was married to Melissa Ellen Crawford and had seven children. He died on November 26, 1916, in Coal Run, Ohio. He is buried in Round Bottom Cemetery in Ohio. His descendants include singer and songwriter Kelly Clarkson.
