= Manor, Texas =

- City
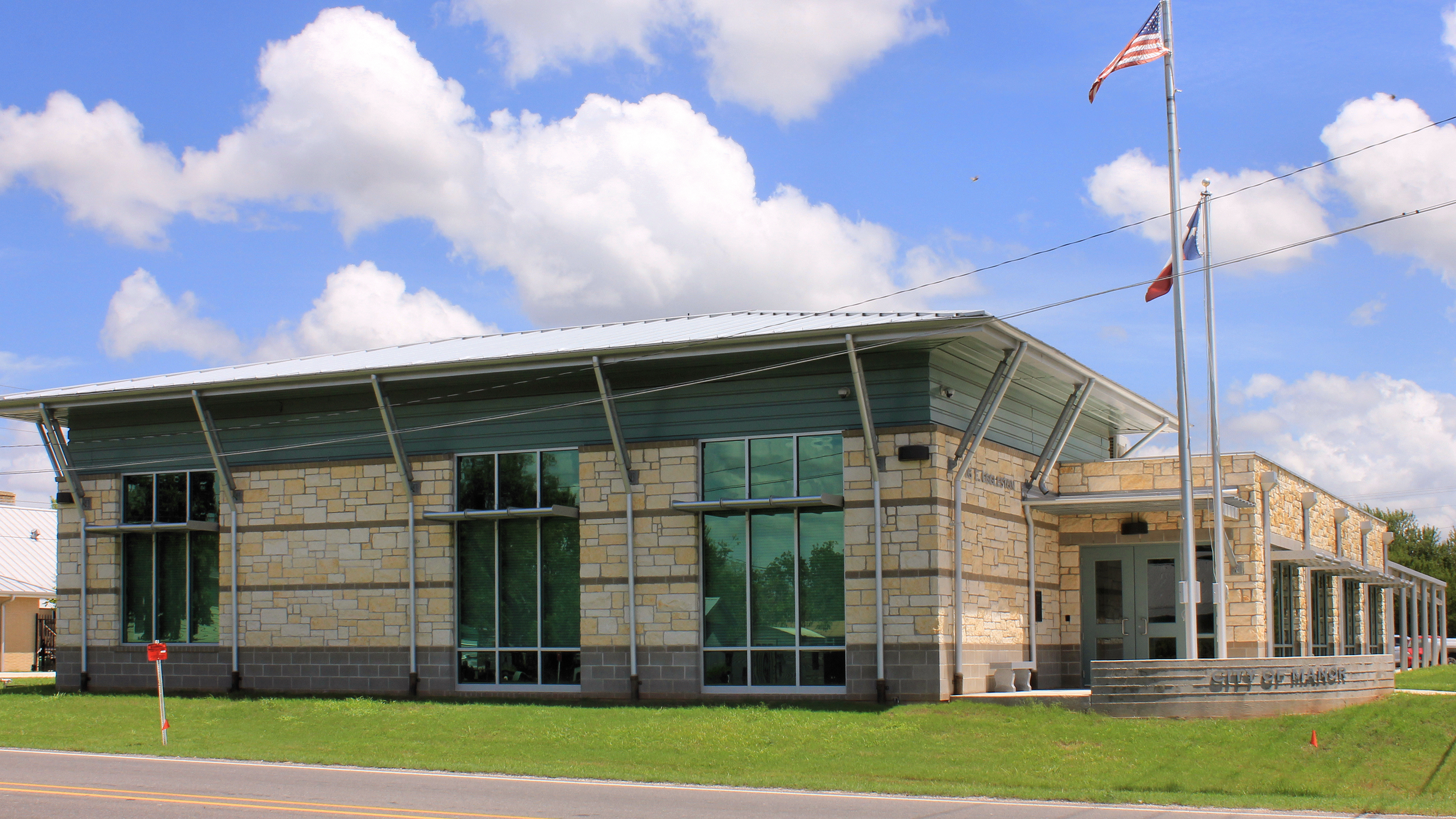
- Manor City Hall

- Location of Manor, Texas
- Coordinates: 30°20′35″N 97°33′24″W
- Country: United States
- State: Texas
- County: Travis
- Founded: 1872
- Incorporated: 1913

Government
  - Mayor: Christopher Harvey
  - City Manager: Scott Moore

Area
  - Total: 9.83 sq mi (25.45 km^{2})
  - Land: 9.80 sq mi (25.39 km^{2})
  - Water: 0.023 sq mi (0.06 km^{2})
- Elevation: 531 ft (162 m)

Population (2020)
  - Total: 13,652
  - Density: 1,393.06/sq mi (537.86/km^{2})
- Time zone: UTC-6 (Central (CST))
  - Summer (DST): UTC-5 (CDT)
- ZIP Code: 78653
- Area codes: 512 and 737
- FIPS code: 48-46440
- GNIS feature ID: 1340895
- Website: manortx.gov

Manor (/ˈmeɪnər/ MAY-nər) is a city in Travis County, Texas, United States. Manor is located 12 miles northeast of Austin and is part of the Austin-Round Rock metropolitan area. The population was 13,652 at the 2020 census, with an estimated population of 23,070 in 2025. Manor is one of the faster-growing suburbs of Austin. The city was the seventh fastest growing suburb in America in 2018 by Realtor.com and the 17th best small suburb to live in by U.S. News and World Report in 2019.

== Geography ==
Manor is located along U.S. Highway 290 at 30°20′35″N 97°33′24″W (30.343071, –97.556710), 12 miles (19 km) east of downtown Austin. According to the United States Census Bureau, the city has a total area of 7.35 square miles (18.48 km^{2}), all land.

== Economy and transportation ==
In 2006, the first parts of a central Texas tollway system opened, which included State Highway 130, State Highway 45, and State Route 212. These roads increased accessibility to Manor. A Walmart was built on the east side of town near the junction of U.S. Highway 290 and FM 973. Manor Medical Center broke ground in 2013.

Manor has also been the location for a number of movies, notably What's Eating Gilbert Grape starring Johnny Depp. The story centered on a developmentally disabled boy, played by Leonardo DiCaprio, who regularly disrupted the town's tranquility by climbing Manor's old water tower. The tank, although no longer used, remains a landmark in the downtown district. There were also several episodes of "Fear the Walking Dead" filmed in Manor.

Manor was initially considered as the site for a new international airport to replace the overcrowded Robert Mueller Municipal Airport; however, several environmental lawsuits were brought by the Sierra Club and others, slowing development until an alternative was presented by the closing of Bergstrom Air Force Base further south. This facility was rebuilt into Austin-Bergstrom International Airport which opened in 1999.

== Education ==
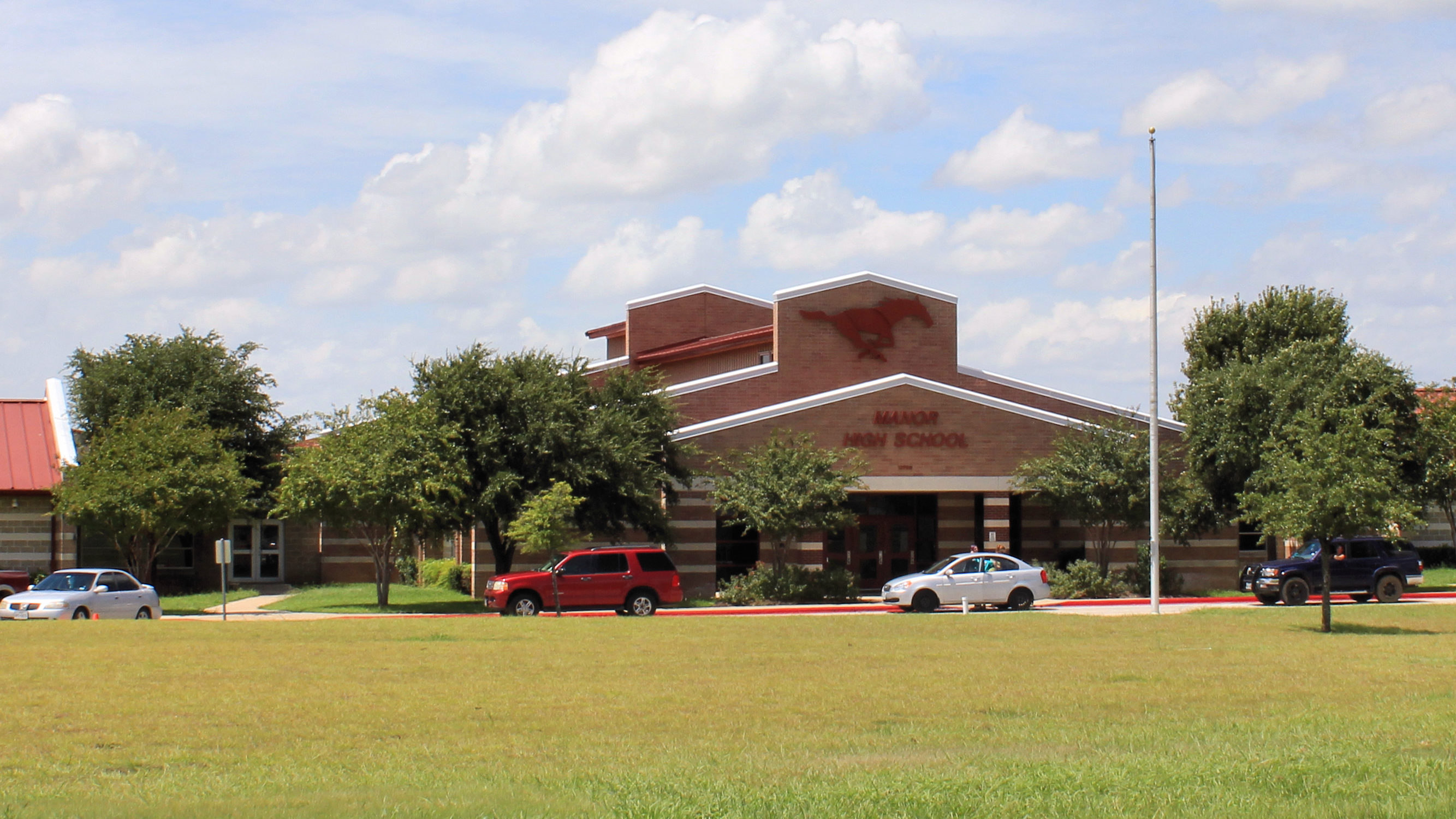
Manor High School

The Manor Independent School District serves most of the City of Manor. President Obama visited Manor New Technology High School in 2013.

A part of the city lies within the Elgin Independent School District.

== Technology ==
The City of Manor was the first government agency in the United States to deploy a QR Code program to disseminate information to residents and tourists. There are currently 24 fixed mounted QR Code signs placed throughout Manor on various city landmarks and structures. Manor has agreements with more than a dozen other small companies for various high-tech services.

== Parks and recreation ==
The Manor area offers abundant opportunities to enjoy the outdoors. Jennie Lane Park in downtown Manor is the center of most community-oriented events such as the Manor Farmers Market, Summertime Movie Series, and Christmas in the Park. The park is a "Smart Park" with WiFi access and coded signage accessible by smartphones for retrieving historical and other information. The park consists of a gazebo, pavilion, and outdoor exercise equipment provided by a grant from the Austin/Travis County Health and Human Services Department's Steps to a Healthier Austin Program.

East Metro Park is a multiple-use recreational area with ball fields, soccer fields, basketball court, playscapes, hiking trails, stock ponds, and both free and fee reserved pavilions. The park also includes a swimming pool managed by the YMCA of Austin and is five minutes southeast of Manor.

Wildhorse Creek & ShadowGlen & Stonewater subdivisions include parks, playscapes, and multi-use fields. ShadowGlen amenities include a 4-acre (16,000 m^{2}) water park and junior Olympic-size pool. Adjacent to ShadowGlen subdivision is one of Golf Digest's America's Best New Courses of 2004.

== History ==
Manor was named for James B. Manor, who settled on Gilleland Creek west of present-day downtown Manor.

A school for boys began operation northwest of the present Manor High School complex in 1854 and was followed in 1858 by a school for girls near the present Manor Elementary School. A post office was reestablished in the Manor home in 1859 under the name of Grassdale with James Manor serving as Post Master. A mercantile store was built in 1868 the present cemetery and was followed by a second store in 1869.

In late 1871 as the Houston and Texas Central Railway constructed the first railroad link to the Texas capital James Manor made a donation of right-of-way which brought the line through what is now the town. The inaugural train arrived in Austin on Christmas Day 1871. The following year the community of Manor was laid out and named. It was incorporated as a town in March 1913 and converted to a general law city in 1921 with expectations of continued growth. Following two devastating fires that destroyed most of the business district, coupled with the decline of cotton production after the arrival of the boll weevil, Manor remained a small city throughout most of the twentieth century.

In 2013 Rita Jonse was elected mayor, which made her Manor's first female Hispanic mayor. In 2019 Larry Wallace Jr. was elected as Manor's first African-American mayor.

== Demographics ==
Historical population
Census	Pop.	Note	%±
1880	120		—
1890	405		237.5%
1920	827		—
1930	654		−20.9%
1940	688		5.2%
1950	820		19.2%
1960	766		−6.6%
1970	940		22.7%
1980	1,044		11.1%
1990	1,041		−0.3%
2000	1,204		15.7%
2010	5,037		318.4%
2020	13,652		171.0%
2025 (est.)	23,070		69.0%
U.S. Decennial Census

=== 2020 census ===
As of the 2020 census, Manor had a population of 13,652. The median age was 30.9 years, 30.7% of residents were under the age of 18, and 5.4% of residents were 65 years of age or older. For every 100 females there were 100.0 males, and for every 100 females age 18 and over there were 98.0 males age 18 and over.

97.4% of residents lived in urban areas, while 2.6% lived in rural areas.

There were 4,220 households in Manor, of which 50.0% had children under the age of 18 living in them. Of all households, 51.9% were married-couple households, 16.3% were households with a male householder and no spouse or partner present, and 22.2% were households with a female householder and no spouse or partner present. About 15.7% of all households were made up of individuals and 3.2% had someone living alone who was 65 years of age or older.

There were 4,523 housing units, of which 6.7% were vacant. The homeowner vacancy rate was 2.0% and the rental vacancy rate was 18.0%.

Racial composition as of the 2020 census
Race	Number	Percent
White	4,261	31.2%
Black or African American	3,051	22.3%
American Indian and Alaska Native	194	1.4%
Asian	422	3.1%
Native Hawaiian and Other Pacific Islander	13	0.1%
Some other race	3,186	23.3%
Two or more races	2,525	18.5%
Hispanic or Latino (of any race)	7,405	54.2%

=== 2010 census ===
As of the census of 2010, there were 5,204 people, 405 households, and 289 families residing in the city. The population density was 1,051.7 inhabitants per square mile (406.1/km^{2}). There were 436 housing units at an average density of 380.8 per square mile (147.0/km^{2}). The racial makeup of the city was 53.16% White, 16.94% African American, 1.50% Native American, 0.08% Asian, 0.58% Pacific Islander, 25.66% from other races, and 2.08% from two or more races. Hispanic or Latino of any race were 48.75% of the population.

There were 405 households, out of which 36.5% had children under the age of 18 living with them, 47.9% were married couples living together, 16.3% had a female householder with no husband present, and 28.4% were non-families. 23.2% of all households were made up of individuals, and 9.4% had someone living alone who was 65 years of age or older. The average household size was 2.97 and the average family size was 3.54.

In the city, the population was spread out, with 30.4% under the age of 18, 10.7% from 18 to 24, 27.6% from 25 to 44, 20.3% from 45 to 64, and 11.0% who were 65 years of age or older. The median age was 32 years. For every 100 females, there were 93.6 males. For every 100 females age 18 and over, there were 89.2 males.

The median income for a household in the city was $37,500, and the median income for a family was $40,455. Males had a median income of $32,857 versus $22,625 for females. The per capita income for the city was $15,607. About 8.9% of families and 11.9% of the population were below the poverty line, including 12.1% of those under age 18 and 9.2% of those age 65 or over.

== In popular culture ==
- The film What's Eating Gilbert Grape, starring actors Johnny Depp and Leonardo DiCaprio, was filmed briefly in and around Manor, Texas as well as Austin, Texas and Pflugerville, Texas.

== Notable person ==
- Amber Heard was born and raised in Manor, Texas.
