= List of highways numbered 207 =

The following highways are numbered 207:

== Canada ==
- Manitoba Provincial Road 207
- Nova Scotia Route 207
- Prince Edward Island Route 207
- Quebec Route 207

== China ==
- China National Highway 207

== Costa Rica ==
- National Route 207

== Japan ==
- Route 207 (Japan)

== United Kingdom ==
- A207 road
- B207 road

== United States ==
- Alabama State Route 207
- California State Route 207
- Connecticut Route 207
- Florida State Road 207
- Georgia State Route 207 (former)
- Iowa Highway 207 (former)
- Kentucky Route 207
- Maine State Route 207
- Montana Secondary Highway 207
- Nevada State Route 207
- New Mexico State Road 207
- New York State Route 207
- North Carolina Highway 207
- Ohio State Route 207
- Oregon Route 207
- South Carolina Highway 207
- Tennessee State Route 207
- Texas State Highway 207
  - Texas State Highway Loop 207
- Utah State Route 207 (former)
- Vermont Route 207
- Virginia State Route 207
- Washington State Route 207

Preceded by 206	Lists of highways 207	Succeeded by 208
