= List of highways numbered 214 =

Route 214 or Highway 214 can refer to:

== Canada ==
- Manitoba Provincial Road 214
- Newfoundland and Labrador Route 214
- Nova Scotia Route 214
- Prince Edward Island Route 214
- Quebec Route 214

== China ==
- China National Highway 214

== Costa Rica ==
- National Route 214

== India ==
- National Highway 214 (India)

== Ireland ==
- R214 road (Ireland)

== United Kingdom ==
- A214 road
- B214 road

== United States ==
- Arkansas Highway 214
- California State Route 214 (former)
- Connecticut Route 214
- Florida State Road 214 (former)
- Georgia State Route 214 (former)
- Iowa Highway 214 (former)
- K-214 (Kansas highway)
- Kentucky Route 214
- Maine State Route 214
- Maryland Route 214
- M-214 (Michigan highway) (former)
- Montana Secondary Highway 214
- New York State Route 214
- North Carolina Highway 214
- Oregon Route 214
- Pennsylvania Route 214
- Rhode Island Route 214
- South Dakota Highway 214 (former)
- Tennessee State Route 214
- Texas State Highway 214
  - Texas State Highway Loop 214 (former)
  - Texas State Highway Spur 214 (former)
- Utah State Route 214 (former)
- Vermont Route 214
- Virginia State Route 214
- West Virginia Route 214
- Wyoming Highway 214

Preceded by 213	Lists of highways 214	Succeeded by 215
