= List of highways numbered 211 =

The following highways are numbered 211:

== Canada ==
- Manitoba Provincial Road 211
- Newfoundland and Labrador Route 211
- Nova Scotia Route 211
- Prince Edward Island Route 211
- Quebec Route 211
- Saskatchewan Highway 211

== China ==
- China National Highway 211

== Costa Rica ==
- National Route 211

== Japan ==
- Japan National Route 211

== United Kingdom ==
- A211 road
- B211 road

== United States ==
- U.S. Route 211
- Alabama State Route 211
- Arkansas Highway 211
- California State Route 211
- Florida State Road 211
- Georgia State Route 211
- K-211 (Kansas highway)
- Kentucky Route 211
- Maine State Route 211 (former)
- Maryland Route 211 (former)
- Montana Secondary Highway 211
- New Mexico State Road 211
- New York State Route 211
- North Carolina Highway 211
- Ohio State Route 211
- Oregon Route 211
- South Carolina Highway 211
- Tennessee State Route 211
- Texas State Highway 211
- Utah State Route 211
- Virginia State Route 211
- Washington State Route 211
- West Virginia Route 211
- Wyoming Highway 211

Preceded by 210	Lists of highways 211	Succeeded by 212
