= Utah State Route 215 (disambiguation) =

State Route 215

Location
- Country: United States
- State: Utah

Highway system
- Utah State Highway System; Interstate; US; State; Minor; Scenic
← SR-214 (disambiguation)	→ SR-216

Utah State Route 215 may refer to:

- Utah State Route 215, the legislative overlay designation for Interstate (I-215) within Utah, United States. By Utah State law, I-215 within the state has been defined as "State Route 215" since 1977).
- Utah State Route 215 (1968-1969), a former state highway in northeast Millard County and southern Juab County that ran northwesterly from a point on SR-26 (now US-6) 6 miles (9.7 km) southwest of Lynndyl to the Topaz Mountains
- Utah State Route 215 (1957-1959), a former state highway in eastern Tooele County, Utah that ran from Dugway Proving Ground easterly to SR-36 in St. John (now the town of Rush Valley)
- Utah State Route 215 (1941-1953), a former state highway in southeastern Box Elder County, Utah, United States that ran west from SR-1 in Perry for 1.25 miles (2.01 km)

== See also ==
- List of state highways in Utah
- List of Interstate Highways in Utah
- List of highways numbered 215
