= List of highways numbered 210 =

Route 210 or Highway 210 may refer to:

== Brazil ==
- BR-210

== Canada ==
- Manitoba Provincial Road 210
- Newfoundland and Labrador Route 210
- Nova Scotia Route 210
- Prince Edward Island Route 210
- Quebec Route 210
- Saskatchewan Highway 210

== China ==
- China National Highway 210

== Costa Rica ==
- National Route 210

== Japan ==
- Japan National Route 210

== United Kingdom ==
- A210 road
- B210 road

== United States ==
- Interstate 210
- U.S. Route 210 (former)
- Alabama State Route 210
- Arizona State Route 210
- California State Route 210
- Florida State Road 210
- Georgia State Route 210 (former)
- Iowa Highway 210
- K-210 (Kansas highway)
- Kentucky Route 210
- Maine State Route 210
- Maryland Route 210
- M-210 (Michigan highway) (former)
- Minnesota State Highway 210
- Missouri Route 210
- Montana Secondary Highway 210
- New Mexico State Road 210
- New York State Route 210
- North Carolina Highway 210
- North Dakota Highway 210
- Oregon Route 210
- Pennsylvania Route 210
- South Carolina Highway 210
- Tennessee State Route 210
- Texas State Highway 210
  - Texas State Highway Loop 210
- Utah State Route 210
- Virginia State Route 210
- West Virginia Route 210
- Wyoming Highway 210

Preceded by 209	Lists of highways 210	Succeeded by 211
