= List of highways numbered 213 =

Route 213 or Highway 213 can refer to:

== Canada ==
- Manitoba Provincial Road 213
- Newfoundland and Labrador Route 213
- Nova Scotia Route 213
- Prince Edward Island Route 213
- Quebec Route 213

== China ==
- China National Highway 213

== Costa Rica ==
- National Route 213

== Ireland ==
- R213 regional road

== Japan ==
- Japan National Route 213

== United Kingdom ==
- A213 road
- B213 road

== United States ==
- U.S. Route 213 (former)
- Alabama State Route 213
- California State Route 213
- Connecticut Route 213
- Florida State Road 213 (former)
- Georgia State Route 213 (former)
  - County Route 213 (Newton County, Georgia)
- Illinois Route 213 (former)
- Kentucky Route 213
- Maine State Route 213
- Maryland Route 213
- Massachusetts Route 213
- M-213 (Michigan highway) (former)
- Missouri Route 213
- Montana Secondary Highway 213
- New Mexico State Road 213
- New York State Route 213
- North Carolina Highway 213
- Ohio State Route 213
- Oregon Route 213
- Pennsylvania Route 213
- South Carolina Highway 213
- Tennessee State Route 213
- Texas State Highway 213
  - Texas State Highway Loop 213
  - Texas State Highway Spur 213
- Utah State Route 213 (former)
- Virginia State Route 213
- Washington State Route 213 (unbuilt)
- Wisconsin Highway 213
- Wyoming Highway 213

Preceded by 212	Lists of highways 213	Succeeded by 214
