= List of highways numbered 216 =

The following highways are numbered 216:

== Canada ==
- Alberta Highway 216
- Manitoba Provincial Road 216
- Prince Edward Island Route 216
- Quebec Route 216
- Nova Scotia Route 216

== China ==
- China National Highway 216

== Costa Rica ==
- National Route 216

== India ==
- National Highway 216 (India)

== United Kingdom ==
- A216 road
- B216 road

== United States ==
- U.S. Route 216 (former)
- Alabama State Route 216
- California State Route 216
- Connecticut Route 216
- Florida State Road 216 (former)
- Georgia State Route 216
- K-216 (Kansas highway)
- Kentucky Route 216
- Maine State Route 216
- Maryland Route 216
- M-216 (Michigan highway)
- Minnesota State Highway 216 (former)
- Montana Secondary Highway 216 (former)
- New Mexico State Road 216
- New York State Route 216
- North Carolina Highway 216
- Ohio State Route 216
- Oregon Route 216
- Pennsylvania Route 216
- Rhode Island Route 216
- South Carolina Highway 216
- Tennessee State Route 216
- Texas State Highway 216 (former)
  - Texas State Highway Loop 216 (former)
  - Texas State Highway Spur 216
- Utah State Route 216 (former)
- Virginia State Route 216
- Wyoming Highway 216

Preceded by 215	Lists of highways 216	Succeeded by 217
