= List of highways numbered 209 =

The following highways are numbered 209:

== Canada ==
- Manitoba Provincial Road 209
- Nova Scotia Route 209
- Prince Edward Island Route 209
- Quebec Route 209
- Saskatchewan Highway 209

== China ==
- China National Highway 209

== Costa Rica ==
- National Route 209

== India ==
- National Highway 209 (India)

== Japan ==
- Japan National Route 209

== United Kingdom ==
- A209 road
- B209 road

== United States ==
- U.S. Route 209 —Pennsylvania and New York
- Alabama State Route 209
- California State Route 209 (former)
- Colorado State Highway 209
- Connecticut Route 209
- Florida State Road 209 (former)
- Georgia State Route 209 (former)
- K-209 (Kansas highway)
- Kentucky Route 209
- Maine State Route 209
- Massachusetts Route 209 (former)
- M-209 (Michigan highway) (former)
- Montana Secondary Highway 209
- New Mexico State Road 209
- New York State, U.S. Route 209
- North Carolina Highway 209
- Ohio State Route 209
- Oklahoma State Highway 209
- Oregon Route 209 (former)
- Tennessee State Route 209
- Texas State Highway 209 (former)
  - Texas State Highway Loop 209
- Utah State Route 209
- Virginia State Route 209
- Washington State Route 209 (former)

Preceded by 208	Lists of highways 209	Succeeded by 210
