= Manor New Technology High School =

Public school in Texas, United States

Location
- 10323 US-290; Manor, Texas 78653; United States; 30.3437°N 97.5731°W

Information
- Type: Public high school
- Established: 2007
- School district: Manor Independent School District
- Principal: Bobby Garcia
- Teaching staff: 42.64 (on an FTE basis)
- Grades: 9-12
- Enrollment: 602 (2023-2024)
- Student to teacher ratio: 14.12
- Colors: Blue, silver, and white
- Mascot: Titans
- Newspaper: Titan Times
- Website: https://newtechhigh.manorisd.net

Manor New Technology High School (commonly known as MNTHS or Manor New Tech) is a public secondary school in Manor, Texas, United States.

The school is part of the Manor Independent School District (MISD). Serving freshmen, sophomores, juniors, and seniors, with an admissions system based on a lottery system. Three middle schools feed into Manor New Tech: Manor Middle School, Decker Middle School and Manor New Technology Middle School. The school colors are navy blue, silver, and white. The mascot is the Titans.

== History ==
Manor New Tech opened on August 27, 2007. Initially, only 9th and 10th grades were allowed. The first class to fully complete all four years at MNTHS graduated in 2011.

President Barack Obama visited the high school in May 2013.

The school was partially renovated in 2019 by PBK Architects, Inc. who made significant changes including a two-story addition, brand new fabrication lab, remodeled gym facilities, sustainability upgrades, and refreshed interiors.

== Campus ==
Manor New Tech was built on the former site of Manor Middle School and Manor High School. It shares the campus with Manor ISD Administration office, Manor ISD Transportation department and Manor New Technology Middle School.

The campus includes a refurbished football/soccer stadium, a multipurpose facility and workshop for engineering classes.

== Academics ==
The school is a member of the New Tech Network, a collection of schools guided by the non-profit of the same name which focuses STEAM instruction using the Project-based learning method incorporated with the use of technology. Specifically, Manor New Tech High is modeled after Sacramento New Technology High School with a focus on enabling student access to modern technology.

== Athletics ==
List of sports:

- Baseball
- Basketball (girls/boys)
- Cheerleading
- Cross-Country
- Football
- Powerlifting
- Soccer (girls/boys)
- Softball
- Tennis
- Track
- Volleyball
