= List of highways numbered 208 =

The following highways are numbered 208:

== Canada ==
- Nova Scotia Route 208
- Prince Edward Island Route 208
- Quebec Route 208

== China ==
- China National Highway 208

== Japan ==
- Japan National Route 208

== United Kingdom ==
- A208 road
- B208 road

== United States ==
- U.S. Route 208 (former proposal)
- Alabama State Route 208
- California State Route 208 (former)
- Florida State Road 208
- Georgia State Route 208
- Kentucky Route 208
- Maine State Route 208
- Maryland Route 208
- M-208 (Michigan highway) (former)
- Montana Secondary Highway 208
- Nevada State Route 208
- New Jersey Route 208
- New Mexico State Road 208
- New York State Route 208
- North Carolina Highway 208
- Ohio State Route 208
- Oregon Route 208 (former)
- Pennsylvania Route 208
- Tennessee State Route 208
- Texas State Highway 208
  - Farm to Market Road 208 (former)
- Utah State Route 208
- Virginia State Route 208

Territories

- Puerto Rico Highway 208 (unbuilt)

Preceded by 207	Lists of highways 208	Succeeded by 209
