= Manor Independent School District =

School district in Texas, United States

Location
- Manor, TX Central Texas Travis County; United States

District information
- Type: Public
- Grades: PK–12
- Established: 1885
- Superintendent: Robert Sormani
- Schools: 16
- NCES District ID: 4828890

Students and staff
- Students: 9,658
- Teachers: 621.16 (on an FTE basis)
- Student–teacher ratio: 15.55:1

Other information
- Website: www.manorisd.net

Manor Independent School District (MISD) is a public school district based in Manor, Texas, United States. The district serves much of Manor, as well as a wide section of northeastern Austin and a small portion of Pflugerville. In 2022, the school district received a C rating from the Texas Education Agency.

As of 2013 MISD covers 21.8 square miles (56 km^{2}) of land within the City of Austin, making up 6.9% of the city's territory.

Samsung Austin Semiconductor and Applied Materials Austin, located in Austin, Texas and in the Manor Independent School District, have developed strong partnerships with Manor ISD, with increased support of STEM initiatives and building an effective mentoring program.

== Schools ==
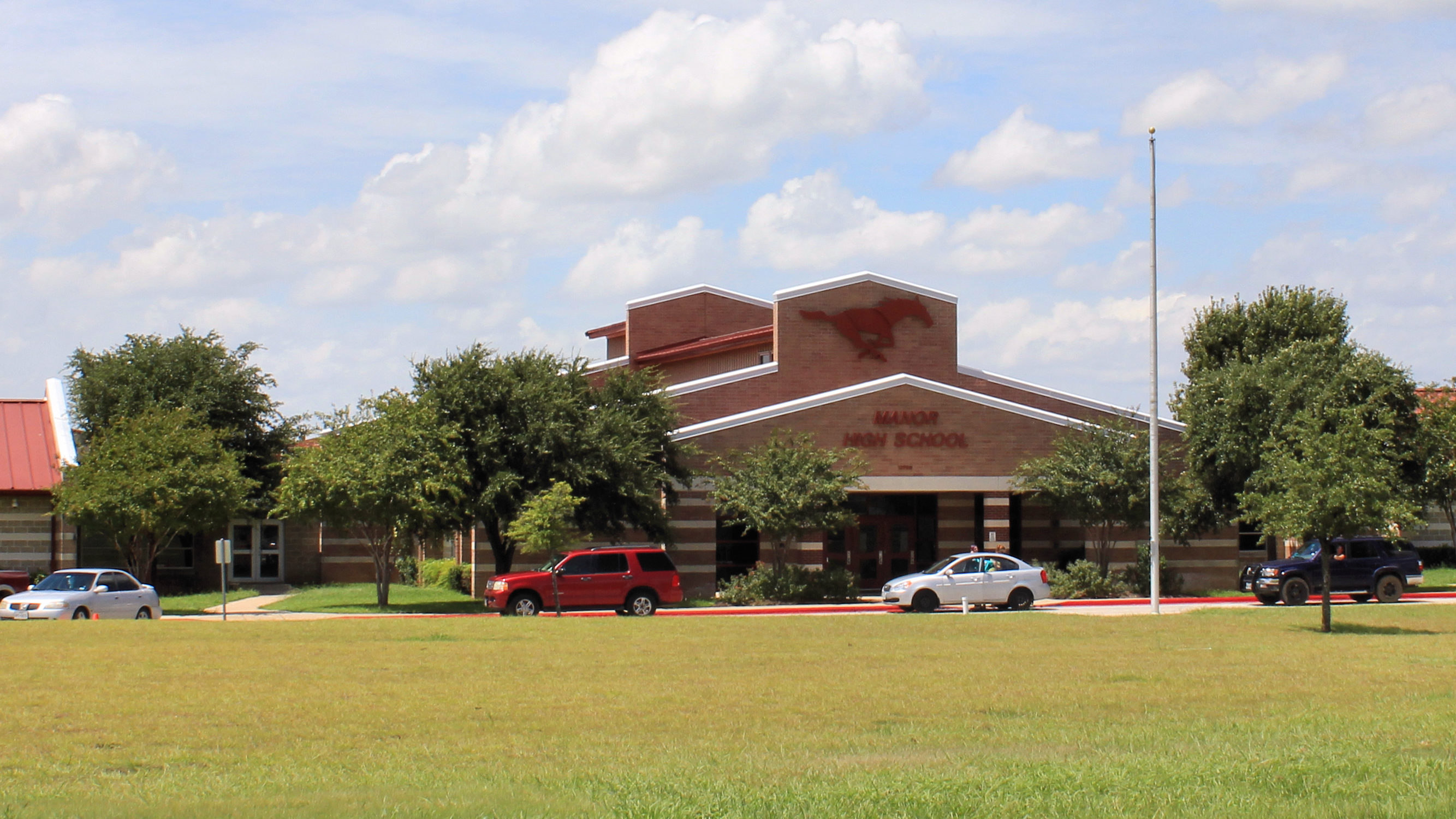
Manor High School

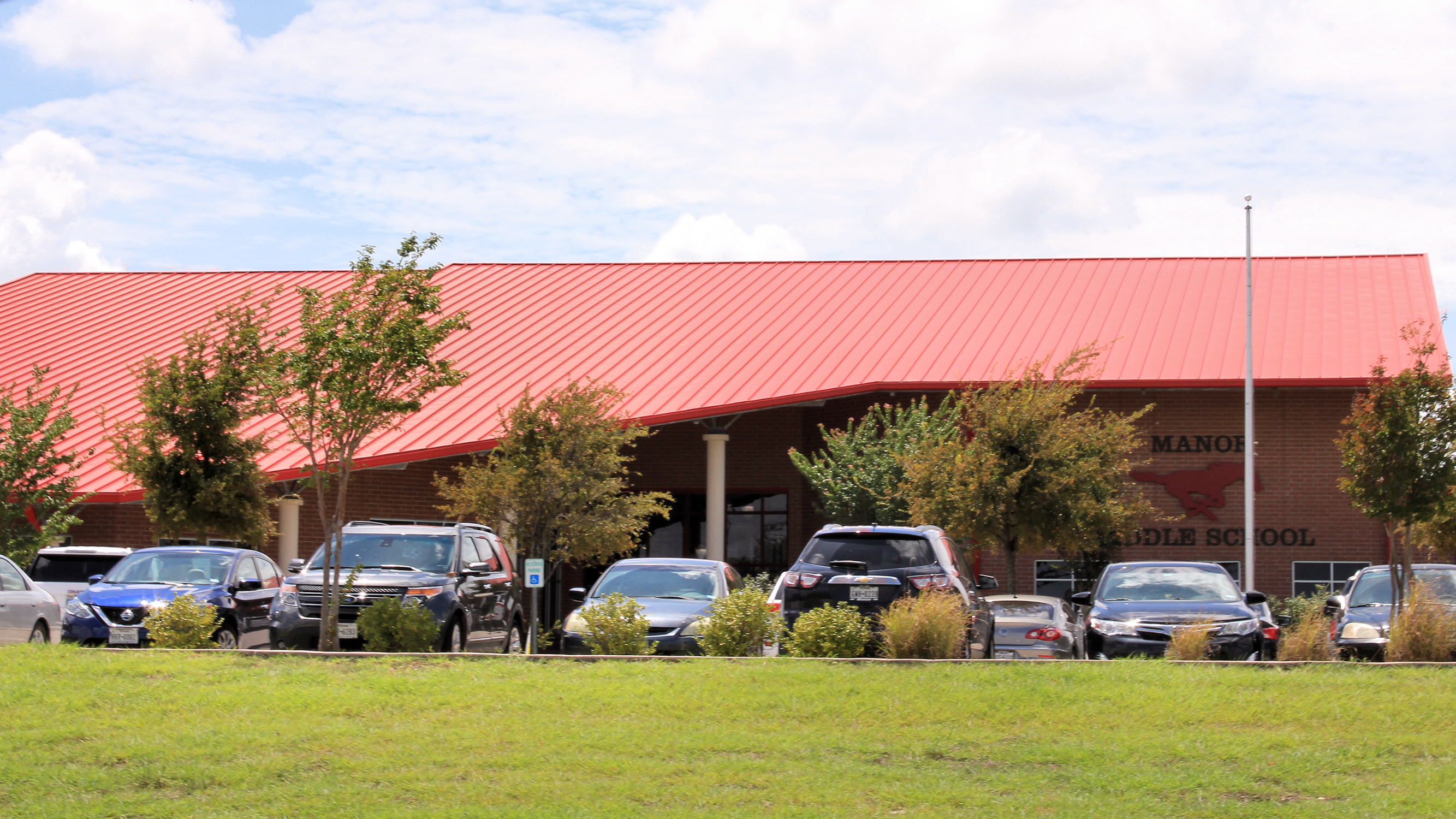
Manor Middle School

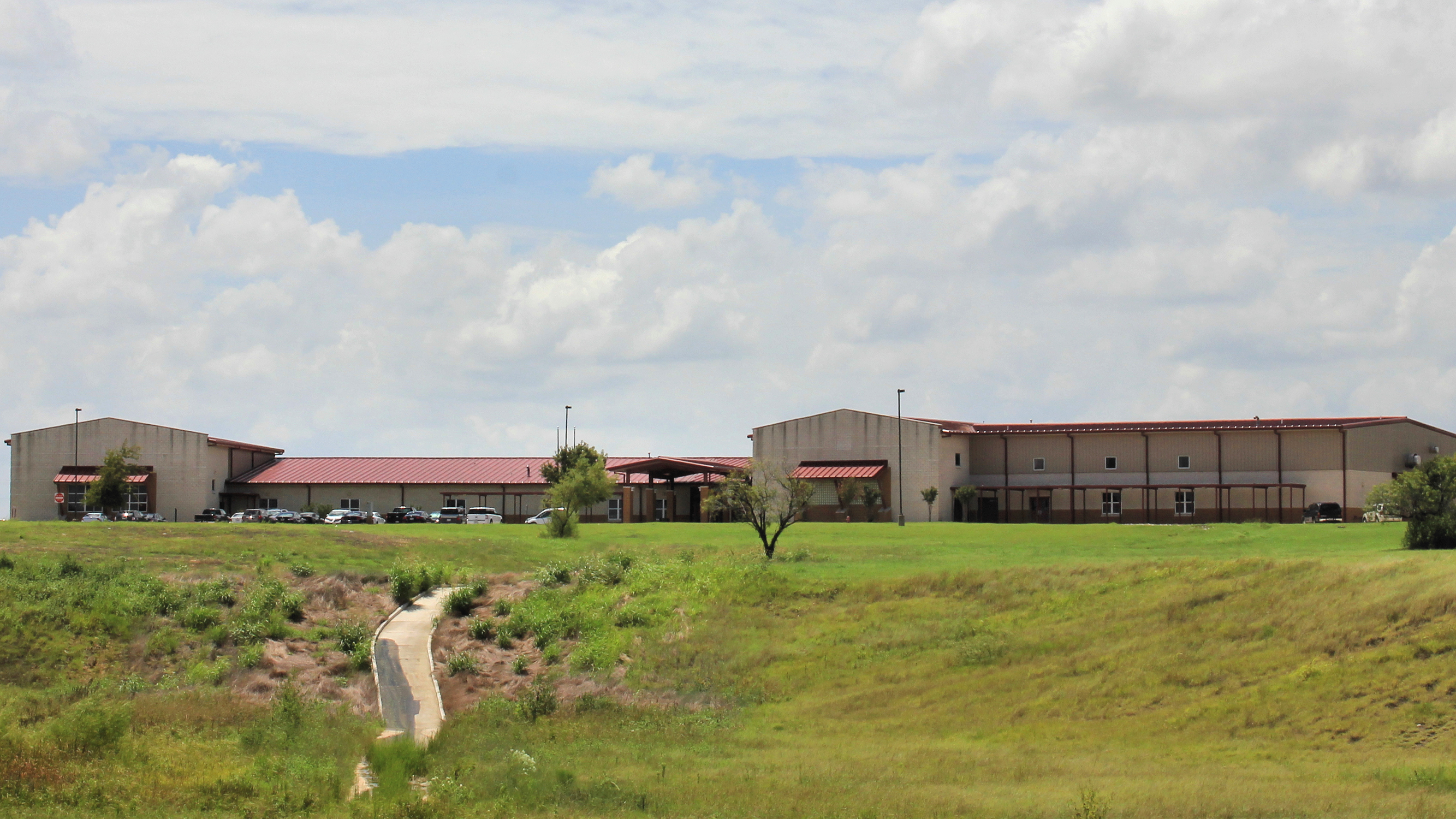
Manor Elementary School

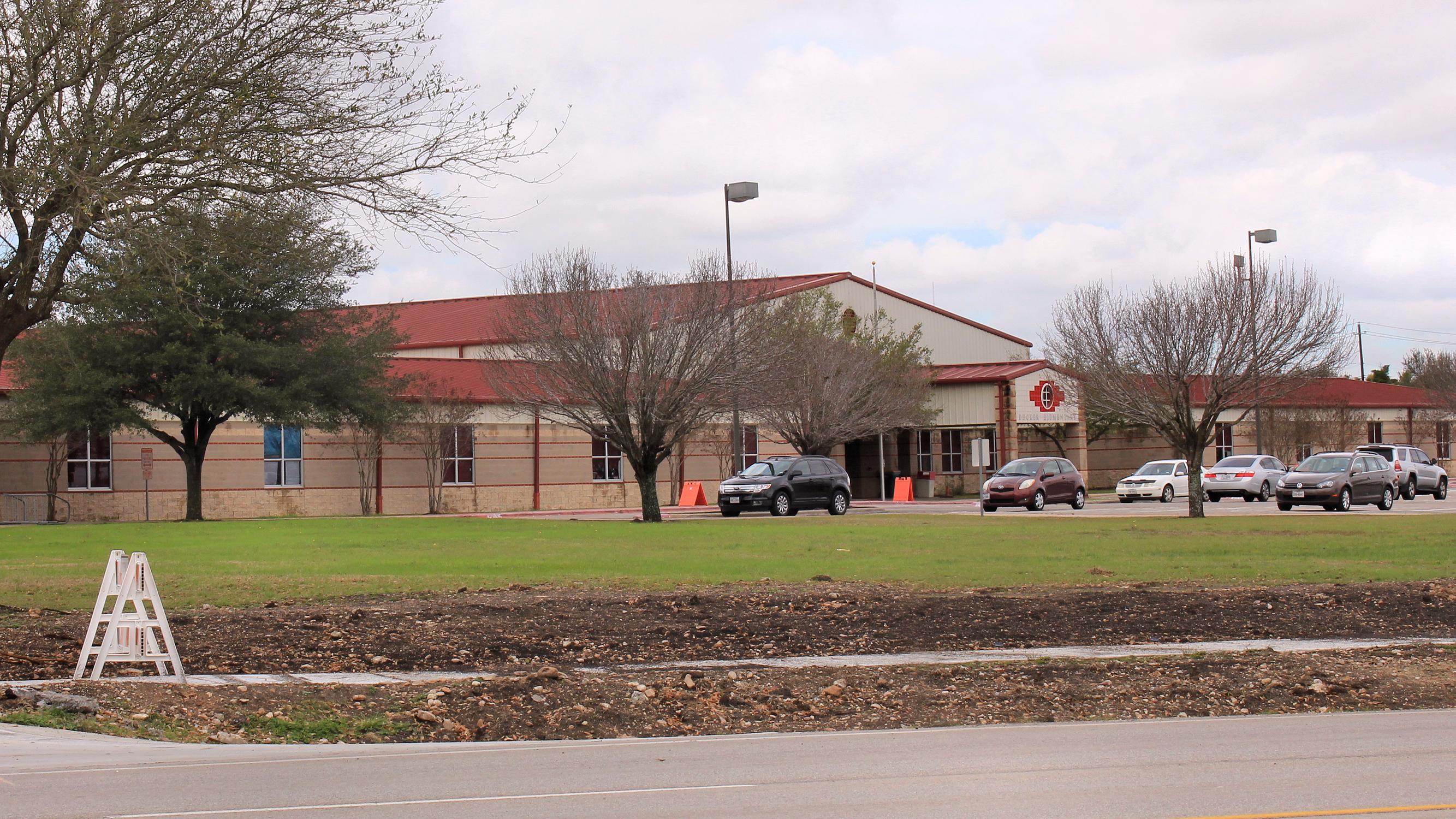
Decker Elementary School

=== High schools (grades 9-12) ===
- Manor High School (Grade 9-10)
- Manor Senior High School (Grade 11-12)
- Manor New Technology High School
- Manor Excel Academy
- Manor Early College High School

=== Middle schools (grades 6-8) ===
- Decker Middle School
- Manor Middle School
- Manor New Technology Middle School

=== Elementary schools (grades PK-5) ===
- Blake Manor Elementary
- Bluebonnet Trail Elementary
- Decker Elementary
- Manor Elementary
- Oak Meadows Elementary
- Pioneer Crossing Elementary
- Presidential Meadows Elementary
- Shadowglen Elementary
- Lagos Elementary

=== K-8 Schools ===
- Manor Rise Academy

== History ==
In May 2013, former President Barack Obama visited Manor New Tech High School as part of his jobs and opportunity tour. Manor New Tech High School specializes in Science, technology, engineering, and math (STEM).

=== Murder of Darrin Loving ===
On October 29, 2024, Darrin Ray Loving, an 18 year-old black student who was disabled and attended special needs classes, was stabbed by another black student, 18 year-old Mac Brown Mbah Mbanwei, on the campus grounds of Manor Senior High School. The Manor Police Department was called to Manor Senior High School after the stabbing was reported to have taken place. The incident occurred around 12:45 PM CST on a Tuesday, and after many unsuccessful attempts from EMS to tend to Loving’s wounds and revive him, Loving succumbed to his injuries and was pronounced dead on the scene at 1:13 PM.

The incident was said to have occurred around lunchtime for the school and in the restroom of the school, in which Loving and Mbanwei got into a physical altercation according to witnesses. According to the witnesses who were near the bathroom at the time, both students got into an altercation which ended with Mbanwei mortally wounding the latter by stabbing him multiple times, around the neck area and his chest. Loving then began losing blood at an alarming rate and ran outside the bathroom into the halls, leaving a trail of blood before collapsing and succumbing to his wounds. Students who witnessed the altercation quickly began to yell and were in a state of panic after seeing Loving's corpse on the ground and the chaos caught the attention of the school's school resource officer, who was patrolling the lunchroom at the time. The officer began looking around for the perpetrator, and students redirected him to the boys' restroom in the cafeteria, where he had glanced into the restroom and saw Mbanwei with his hands in his pockets. The officer ordered Mbanwei to remove his hands from his pockets, to which he refused, and there was a physical struggle between the two until the officer had found a kitchen knife in Mbanwei's possession and seized the knife. Mbanwei was then arrested immediately after and was escorted outside the school.

Mbanwei was booked into the Travis County Jail and charged with first-degree murder, with a bond of $1 million. The district's superintendent has declined to share details about Mbanwei or Loving's behavioral records due to federal privacy laws. Mbanwei had a court hearing on November 18, during which, Judge Brandy Mueller, the presiding Judge of the 403rd Court District, ordered Mbanwei to be examined by an expert competency evaluator, to determine if the defendant is mentally competent to stand trial at this time. The next hearing was set for January 6, 2025.
