= Blackstrap Provincial Park =

Provincial park in Saskatchewan, Canada

- IUCN category V (protected landscape/seascape)
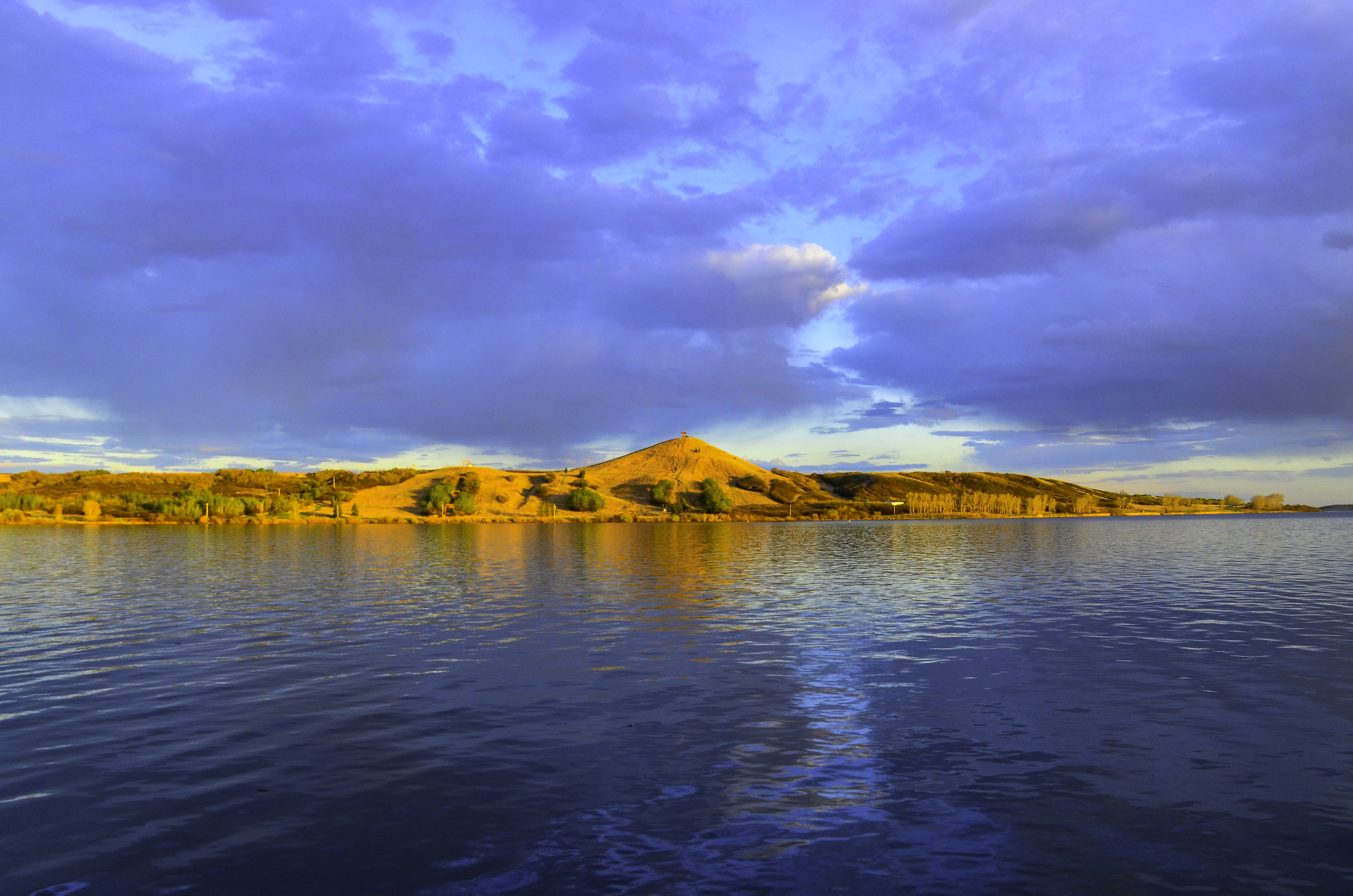

- Location within Saskatchewan Location within Canada
- Interactive map of Blackstrap Provincial Park
- Location: Saskatchewan, Canada
- Nearest city: Saskatoon
- Coordinates: 51°45′20″N 106°27′29″W
- Established: 1986
- Governing body: Sask Parks

Blackstrap Provincial Park is a provincial park in the Canadian province of Saskatchewan in the RM of Dundurn No. 314. Prior to the park's establishment in 1986, it was a provincial recreation site. The park runs along the eastern shore of Blackstrap Lake and consists of a conservation area, campground, beaches, Mount Blackstrap, cross country ski trails, biking and hiking trails, and several picnicking areas. It is about 8.5 kilometres (5.3 mi) east of the town of Dundurn and accessed via Highway 211. Mount Blackstrap is a man-made mountain built as a ski hill for the 1971 Canada Winter Games. It continued to operate as a ski hill until 2007.

== History ==
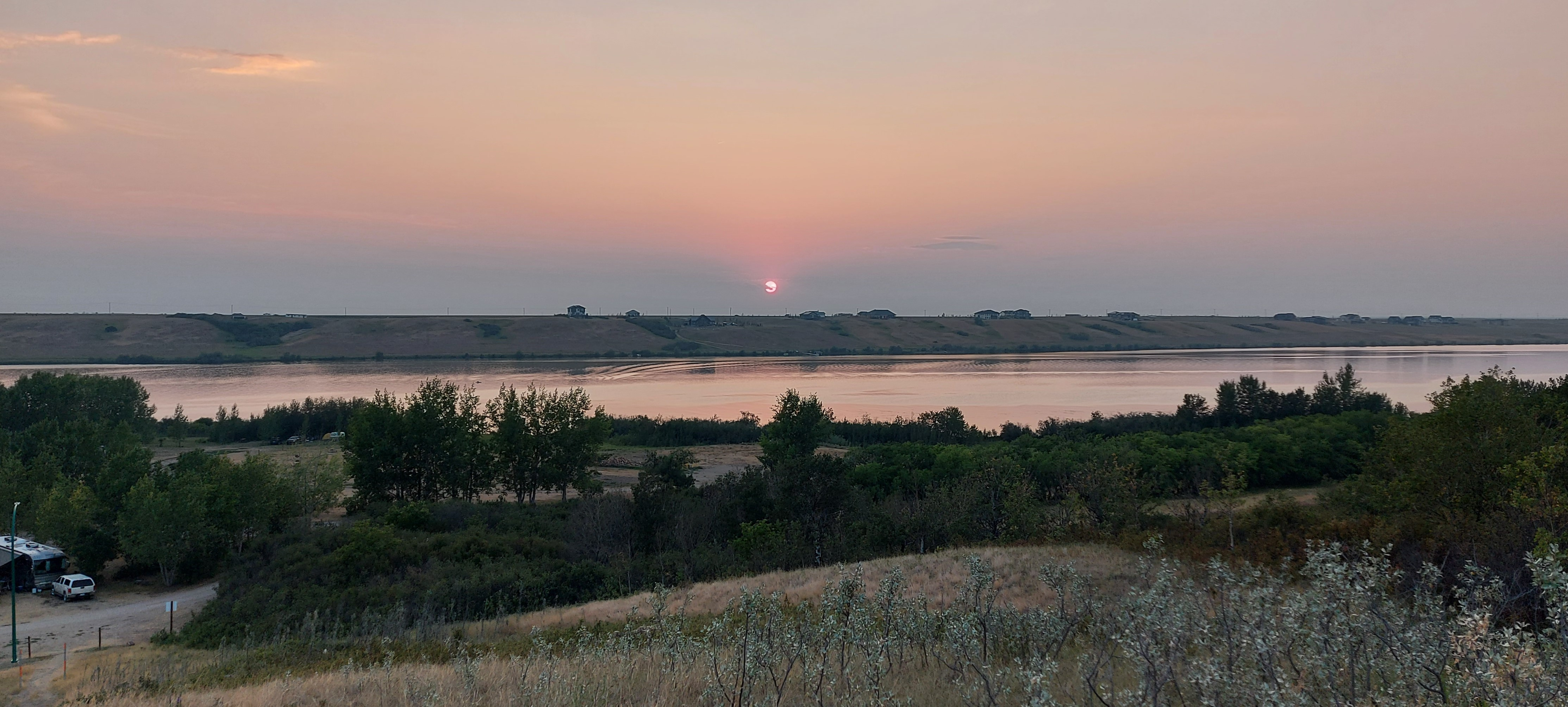
Blackstrap Lake viewed from Sunset Ridge Campground

Blackstrap Lake is a man-made lake that was created in 1967 as a water reservoir for agricultural, industrial, and recreational uses. Saskatoon was awarded the 1971 Canada Winter Games and land was acquired along the reservoir to build a man-made mountain, Mount Blackstrap, for the downhill events. In 1986, much of the eastern shore of the lake, including Mount Blackstrap, became the provincial park. Water used to flood and maintain the lake is gravity fed via an earthen aqueduct from Lake Diefenbaker. Local legend claims that the name for the region is derived from an incident involving the breaking of a barrel of blackstrap molasses during transport through the valley, thereafter becoming known as Blackstrap.

Fred Wilson, reeve of the RM of Dundurn, Whitecap Dakota First Nation, and some surrounding rural municipalities in the area had shown support to convert the provincial park to a regional park. Development of the roadways, cabins, housing, and camping would impart more financial aid to the park, which would be addressed by the communities. The operation of the ski hill for the year of 2007 was estimated at $465,000 by the provincial government. No private sector came forward to run the hill, and it was closed down. Provincial funding to Blackstrap Provincial Park has historically supported the ski hill operations only and the remainder of the park has deteriorated. Christine Tell, minister of Tourism, parks, culture and sport, and Van Isman, Tourism and parks deputy minister will update the provincial government's Blackstrap provincial park management plan to aim to make Blackstrap the best facility it can be.

In 2013, the provincial government announced that two private companies would spend $2.6 million on a new marina and cabins in the park.

In 2016, the provincial government invested $2.9 million in expanding the amenities at the park, including the addition of 63 new campsites.

== Attractions and amenities ==
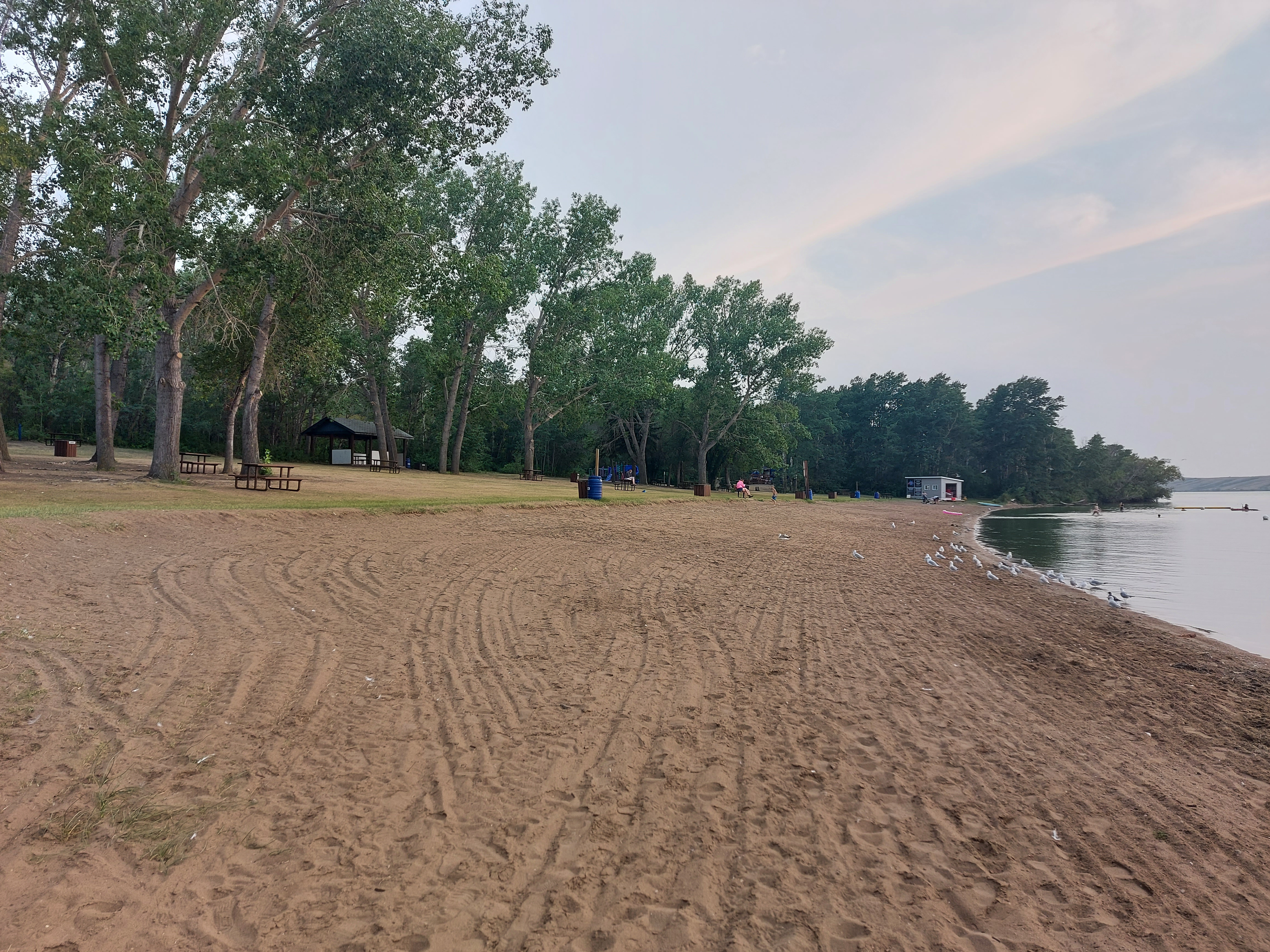
Blackstrap Provincial Park Main Beach

Blackstrap Provincial Park has a wide variety of amenities throughout the park. This includes campgrounds, picnic sites, hiking and biking trails, boat launches, cross-country ski trails, beaches, and an aquatic adventure park. While there are no docks for fishing, there is Fisherman's Point which is a rocky point that juts out into the lake that can be fished from. Near the boat launch is a fish filleting station.

=== Camping ===
There are three main campgrounds totalling over 150 individual campsites. The northern most, and closest to the main beach, is Hazelnut Grove Campground. About half of Hazelnut Campground's sites are along the lake shore. The Kevin Misfeldt Campground is farther south along the lake, well past the main beach. While Hazelnut is entirely electrified, the Kevin Misfeldt sites are a mix of electrical and non-electrical. The Misfeldt Campgrounds also include showers, a playground, a sani-dump station, and a small beach. It is named after a conservation officer, Kevin Misfeldt, who had his career cut short by a fatal accident on 24 January 1997. On that date, he and two others, wildlife biologist Wolly Kost and pilot Brett Thomas, died in a plane crash near Manitou Sand Hills, near Lloydminster. The only full service campsites in the park are at Sunset Ridge Campground. Sunset Ridge is the newest campground and it is set up on the top of the ridge overlooking Blackstrap Lake.

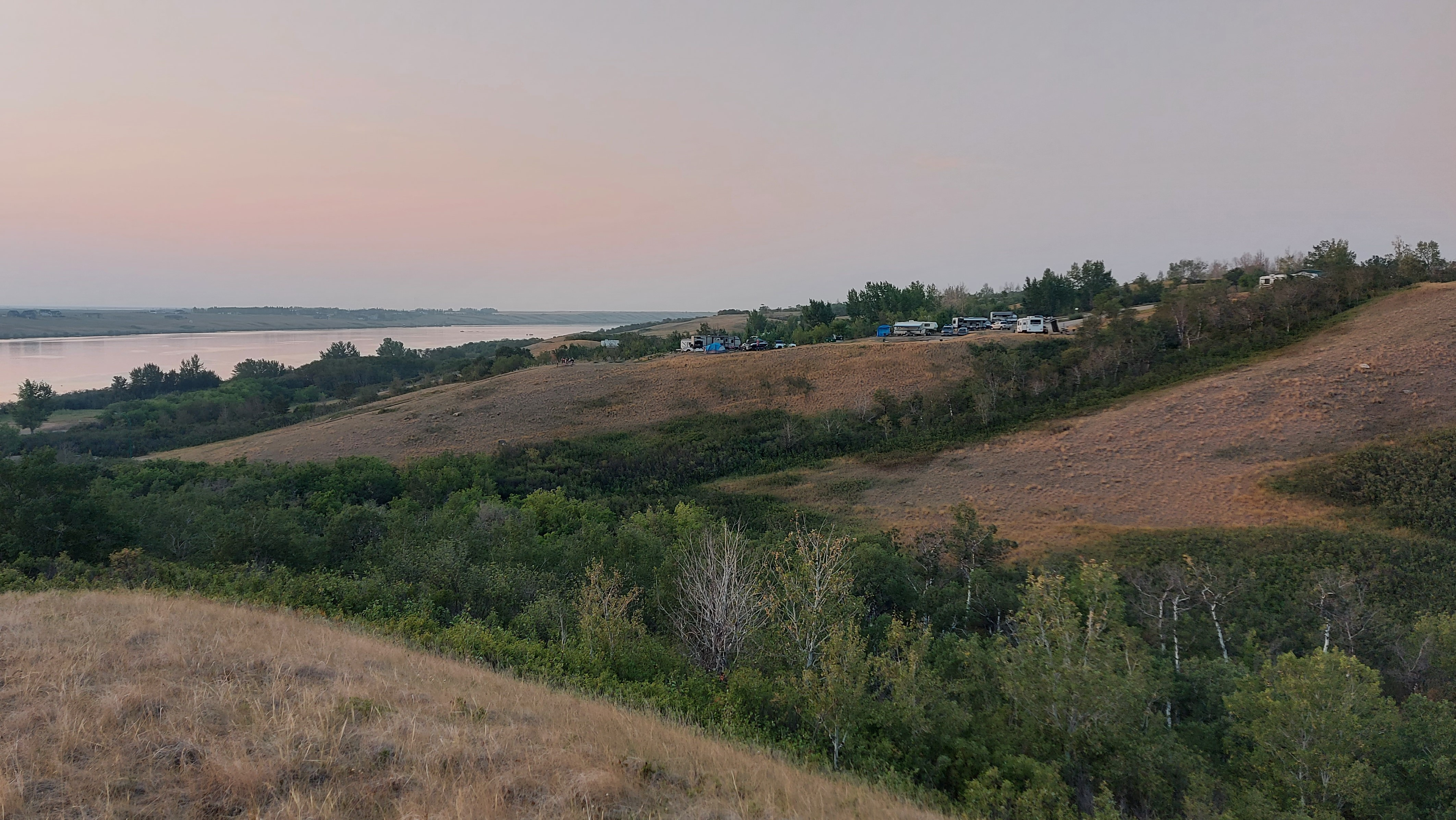
View of Sunset Ridge Campground from across a coulee

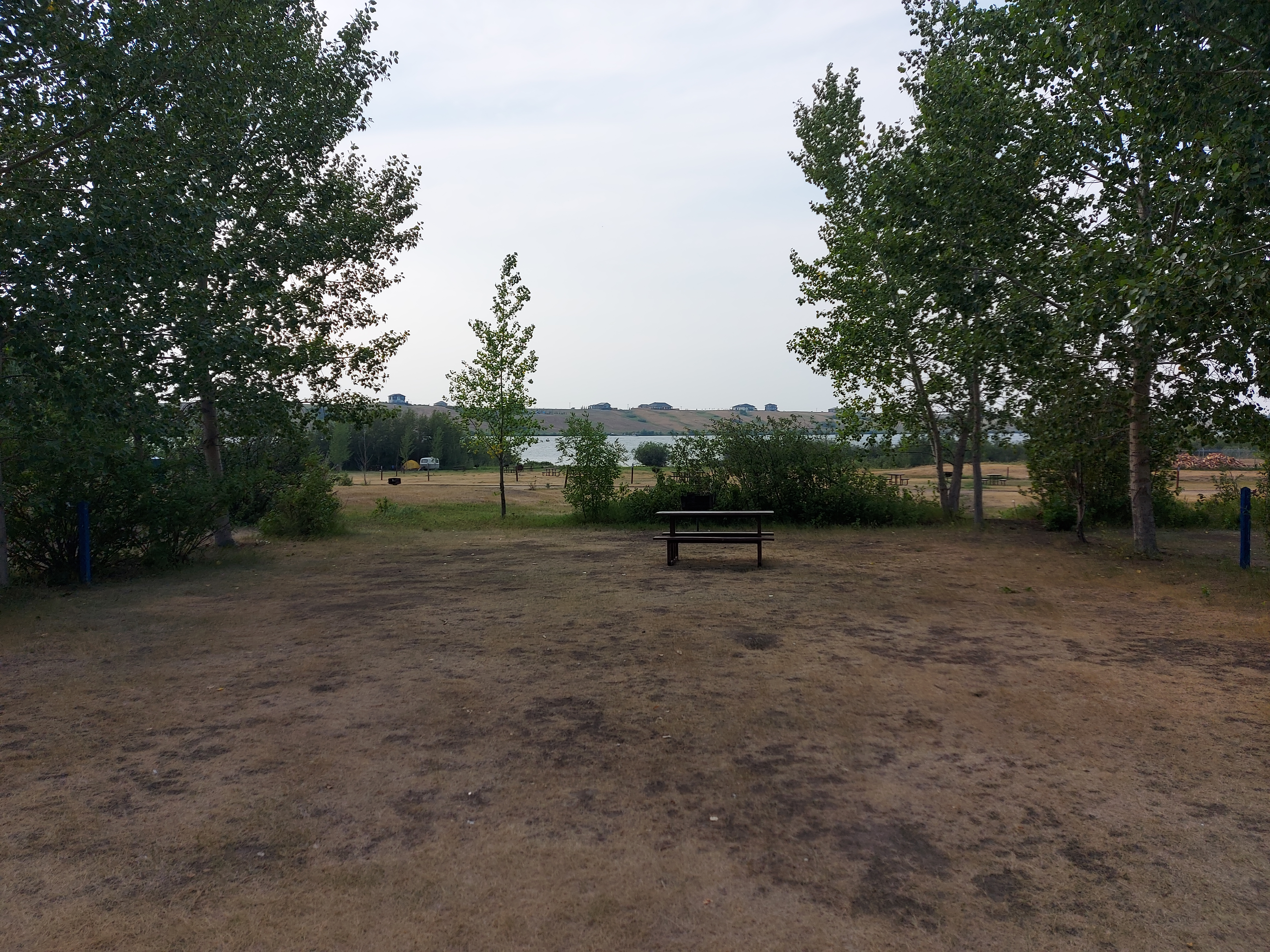
A campsite at Kevin Misfeldt Campground

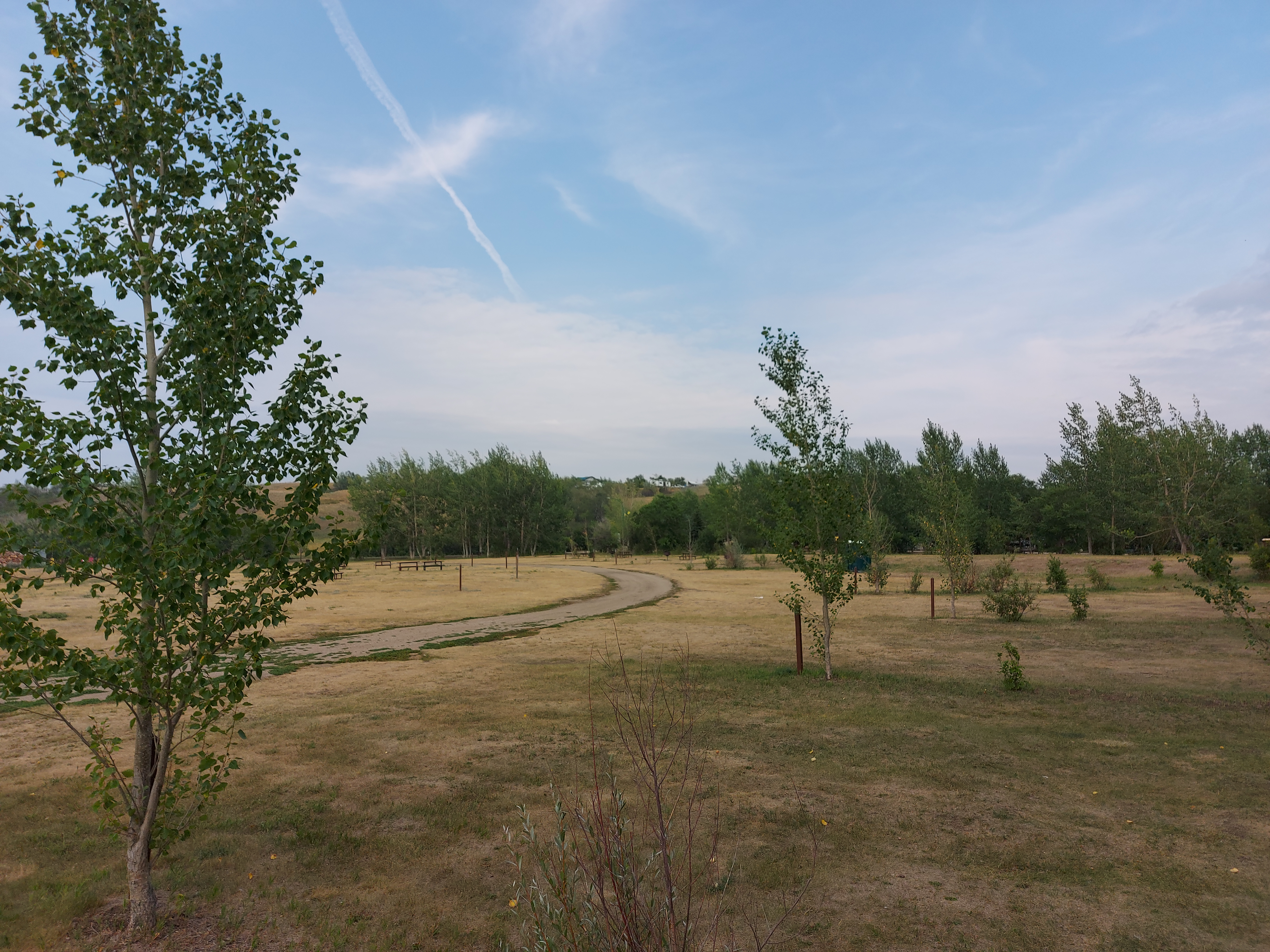
Campsites at Kevin Misfeldt Campground

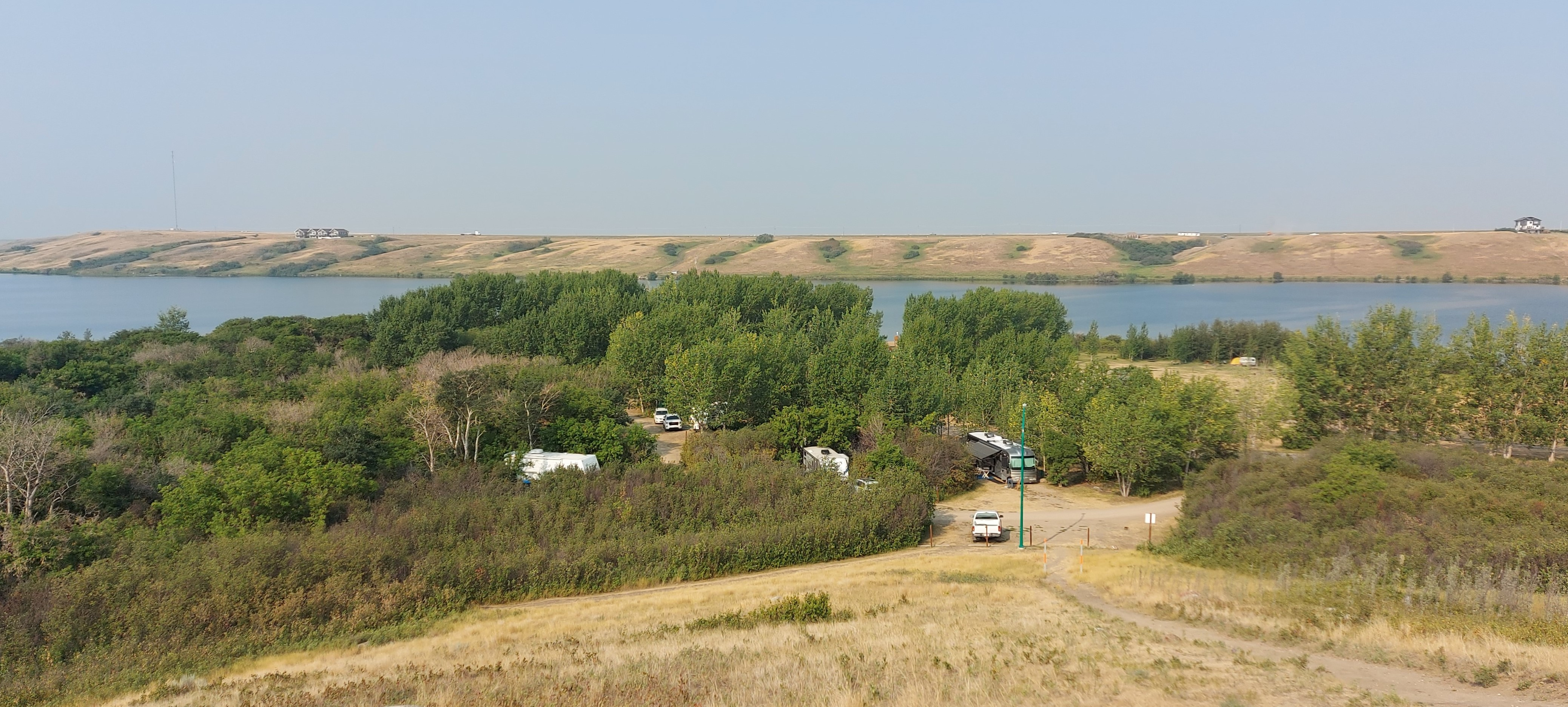
View of Kevin Misfeldt Campground from the lookout

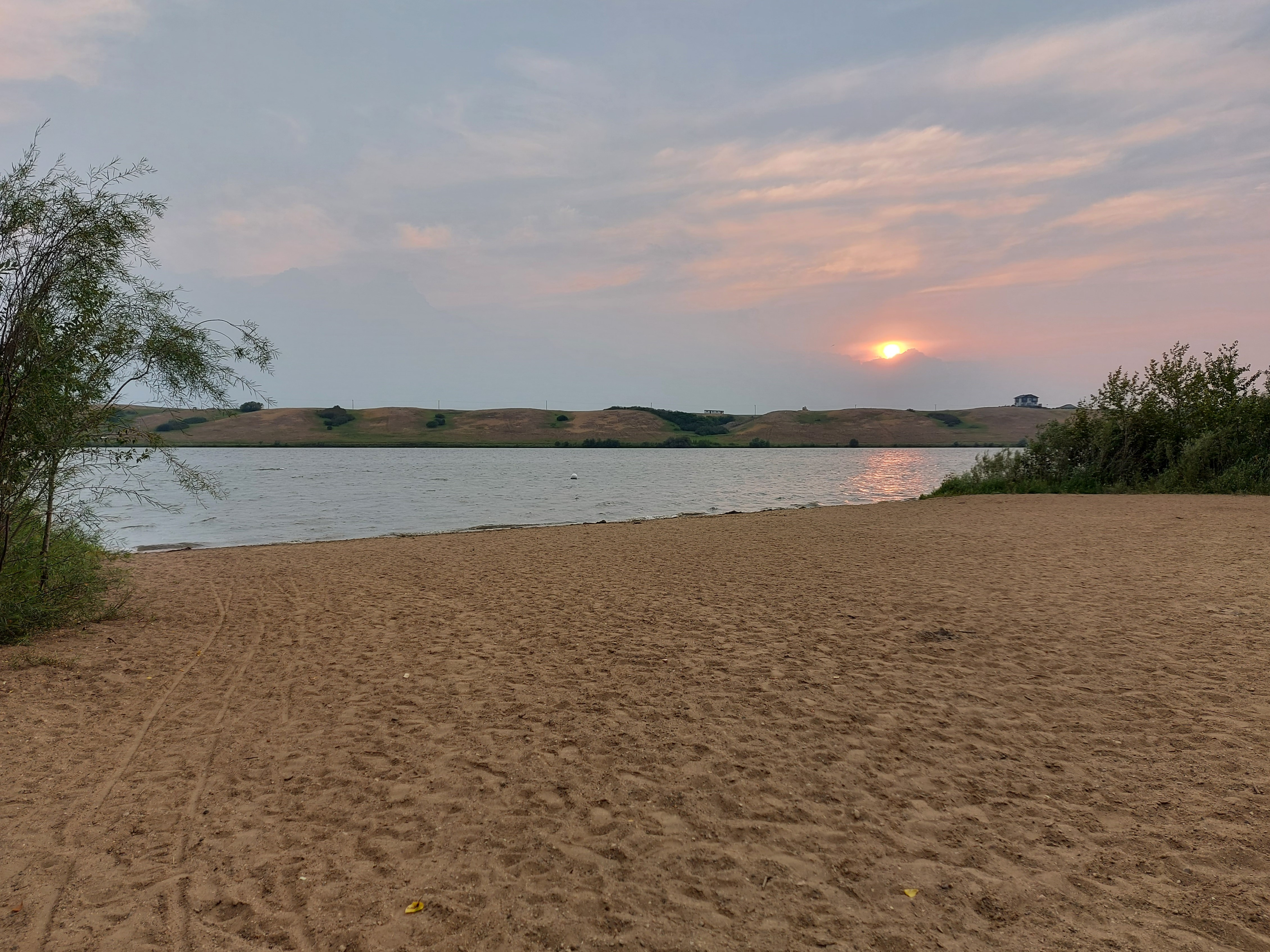
Kevin Misfeldt Beach

=== Picnicking ===
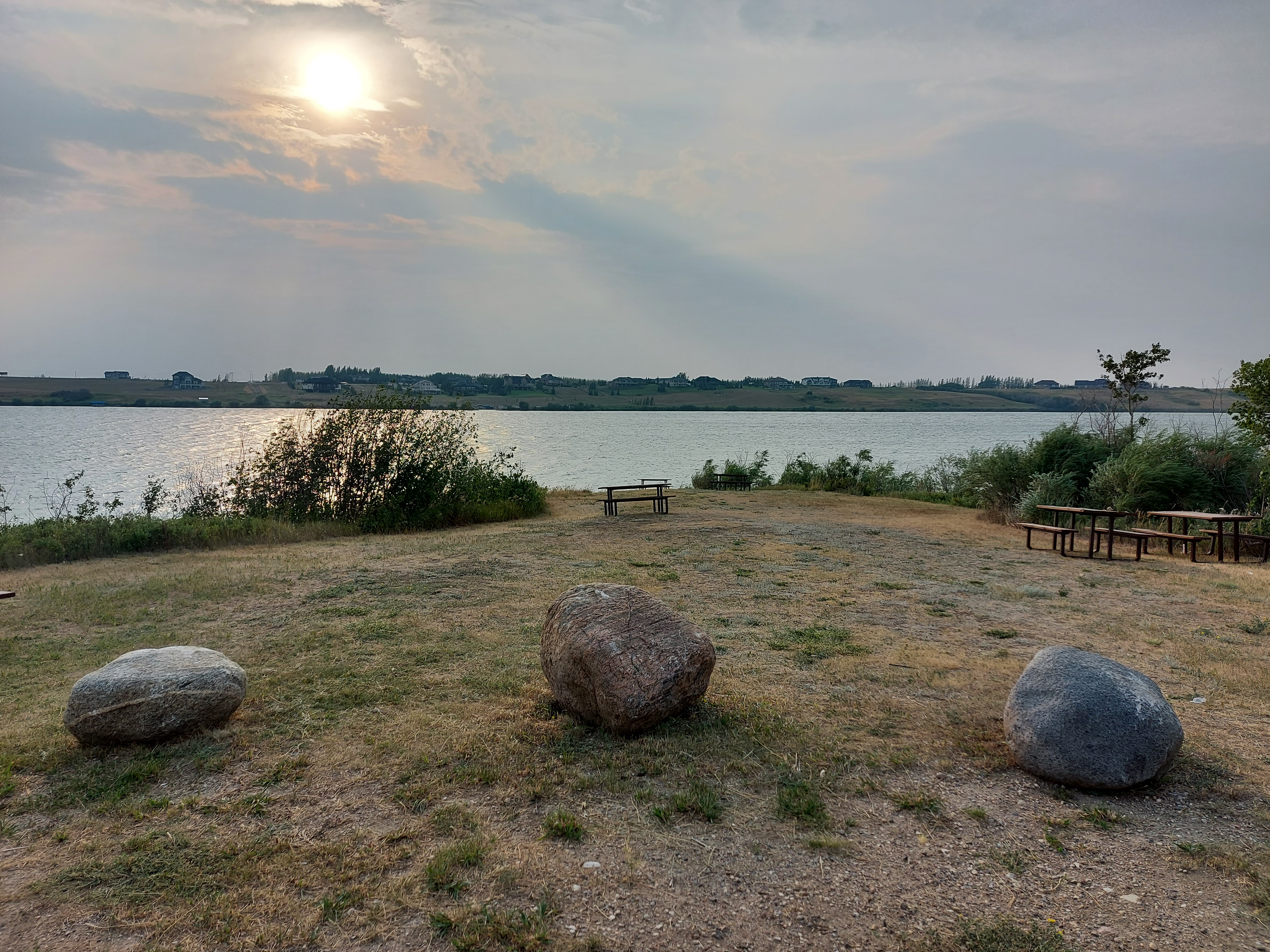
Fisherman's Point, amenities include fishing, picnicking, and hiking / biking as both hiking and biking trails start there.

There are multiple picnicking sites throughout the provincial park. Near the main beach, there's Aspen Grove Picnic Area, Lakeview Picnic Area, and Mountain View Picnic Area. Farther down the lake by the boat launches, there's Lakeside Picnic Area. Other areas of the park are also set up for picnicking, such as at Fisherman's Point and Kevin Misfeldt Campground.

=== Trail system ===
The provincial park and the lake are set in the Blackstrap Coulee, which is a long valley with steep sides. Along the valley, there are several smaller coulees that flow towards the lake as well. In several places along the valley wall and in the smaller coulees, biking and downhill biking, hiking, and cross-country ski trails are set up.

=== Sask Aquatic Adventures ===
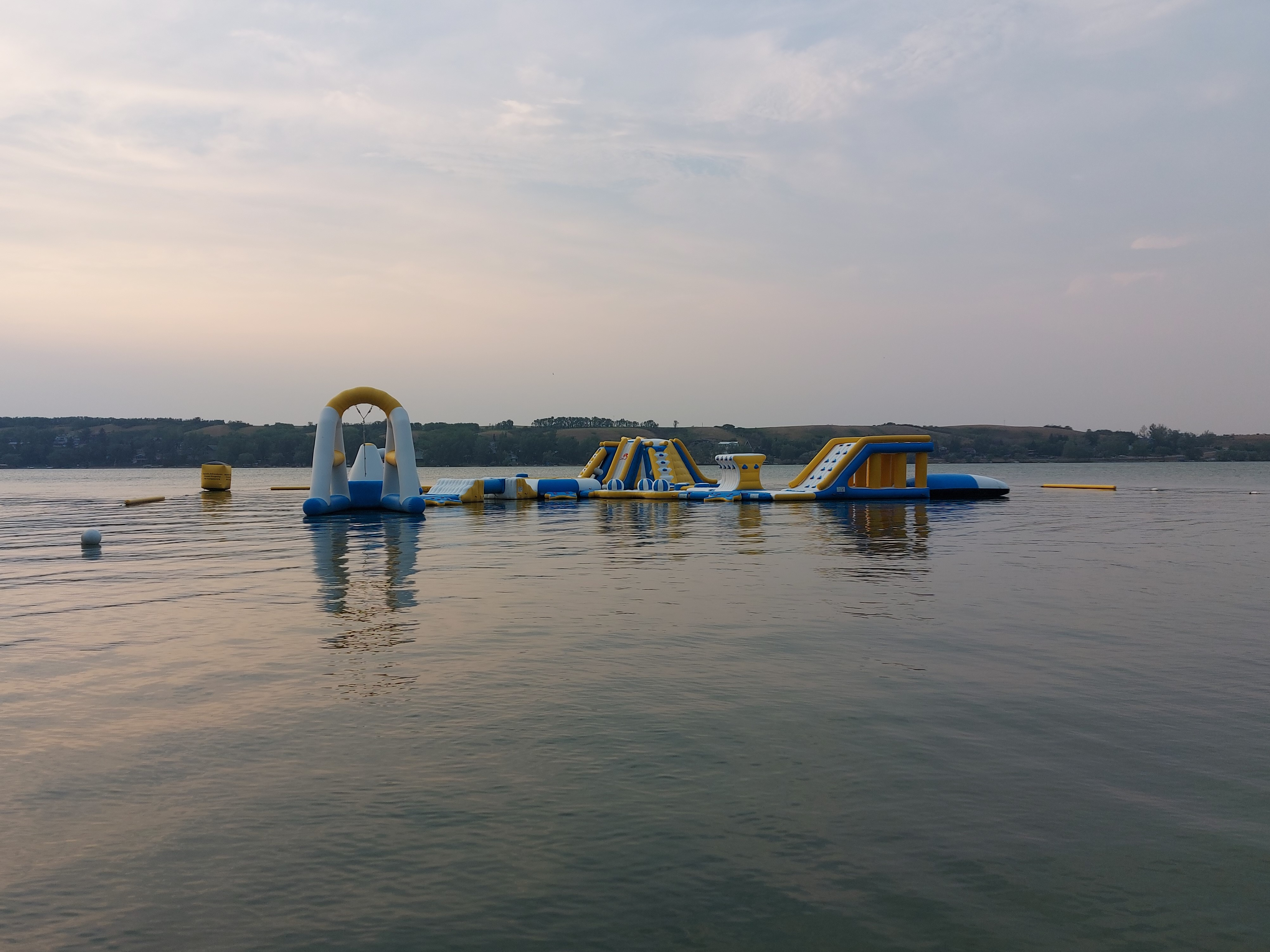
Sask Aquatic Adventures

At the main beach, Sask Aquatic Adventures has a water adventure park set-up just off shore. It is one of several such water adventure parks in Saskatchewan.

== Mount Blackstrap ==
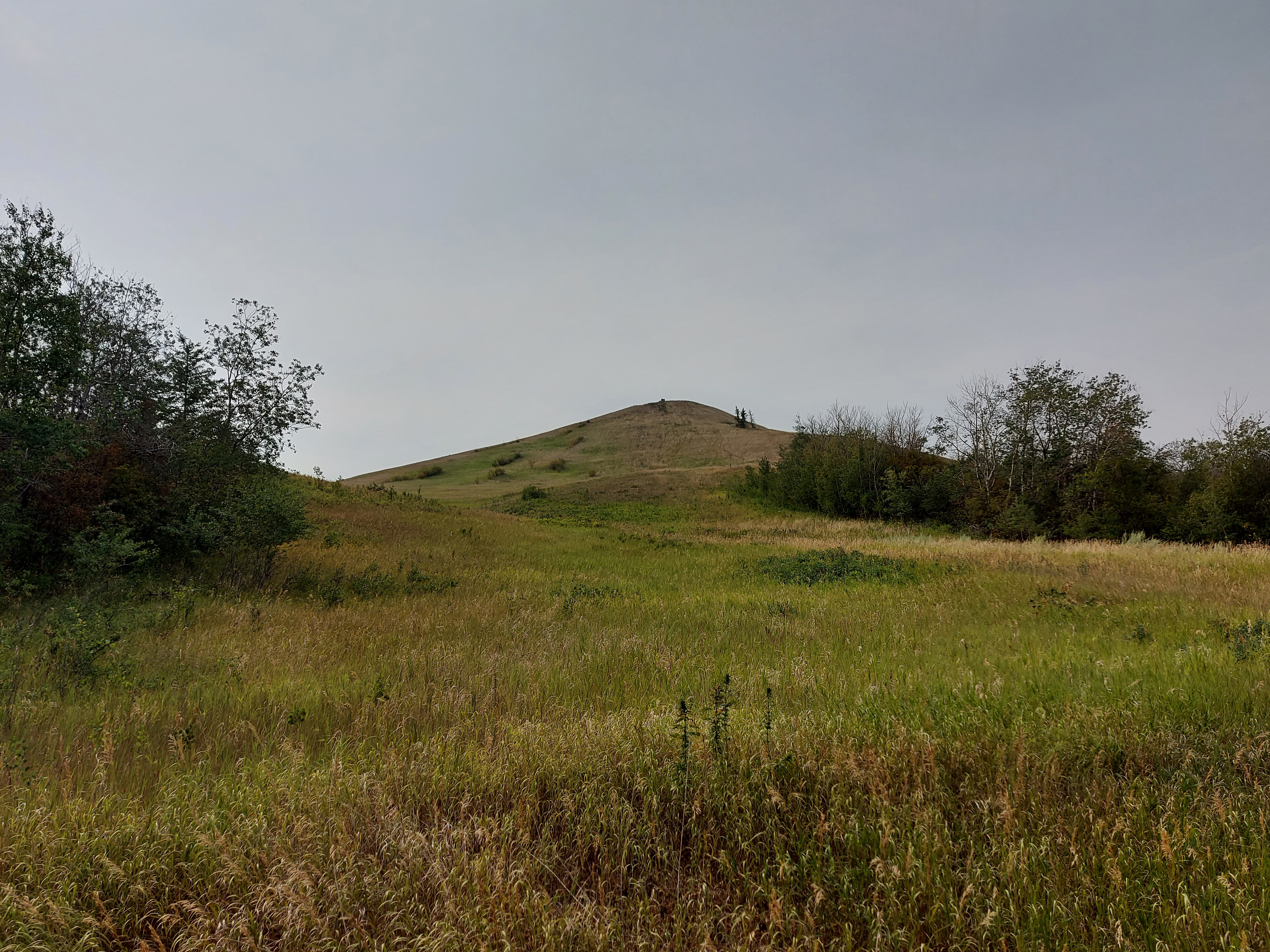
Mount Blackstrap

Mount Blackstrap, also known as Blackstrap Ski Hill, is a man-made skiing and snowboarding hill located approximately 51 kilometres (32 mi) south of Saskatoon, east of Highway 11. It is one of only a few man-made mountains in the world and is a unique feature on Saskatchewan's prairie landscape. It is now a feature of the park along with Blackstrap Lake. It rises 45 metres above the surrounding land.

=== History ===
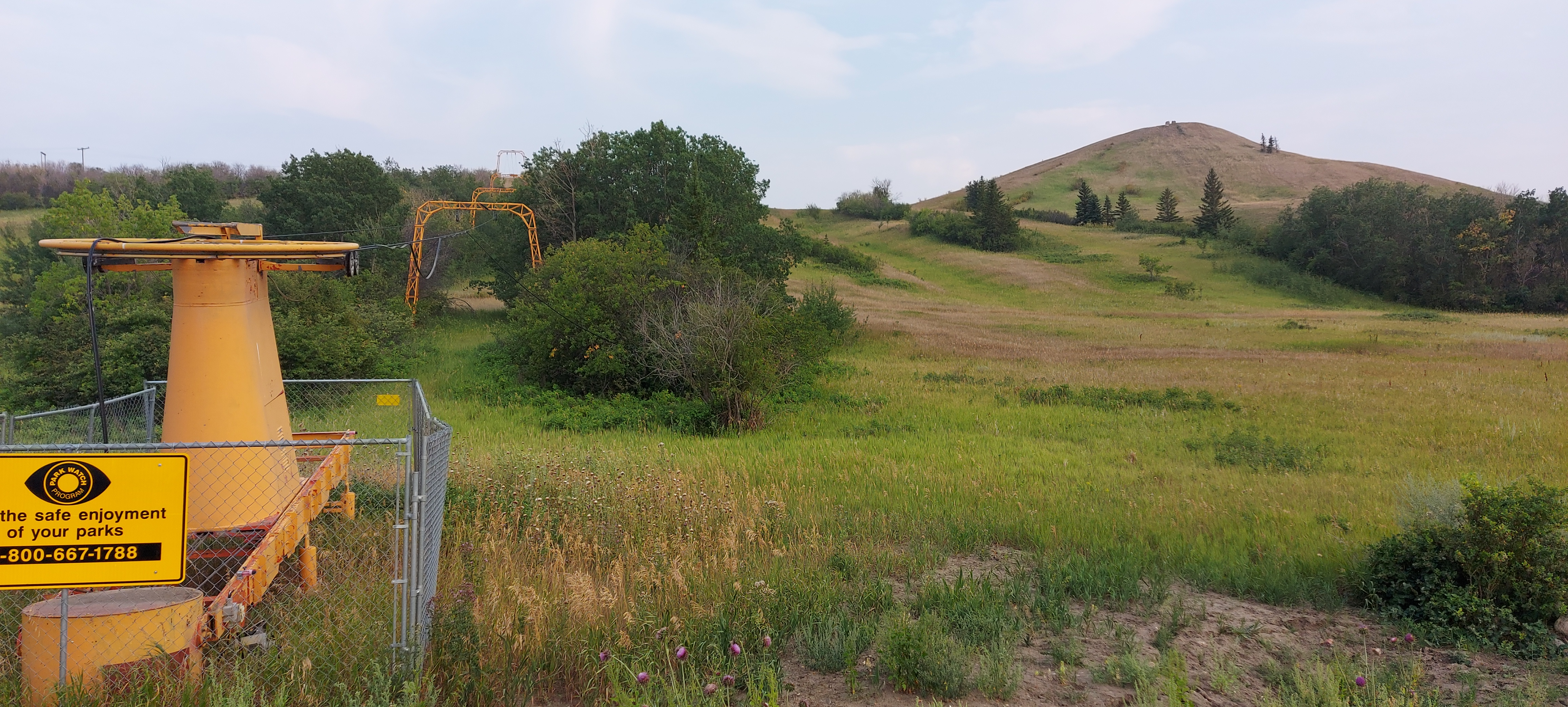
Mount Blackstrap and the abandoned ski lift

The hill was built in 1970 by the Canadian government for the 1971 Canada Winter Games at a height of 2,045 feet above sea level. The mountain is built with soil excavated from the escarpment behind the "mountain". The theme for the Saskatoon bid for the 1971 Canada Games was "Going to build a mountain" in honour of the construction of the hill.

After the Canada Winter Games, the ski hill was turned over to a private operator. However, the hill was closed permanently in 2008 due to declining ridership. The ski lodge was destroyed by a suspicious fire in September 2009. A month later, the provincial government announced that the remaining ski equipment at the hill would be dismantled and sold.

By the end of 2012, three developers had approached the government with proposals to develop a recreation area. Requests for proposals were accepted until the spring of 2013. One developer, British Columbia's Torey Spink, withdrew his proposal over financial concerns, while the other two submissions did not include redevelopment of the ski hill. The ski hill never did get rebuilt and the only things left, besides the hill itself, are part of the ski lift and concrete foundations at the top of the hill.

== Fish species ==
Fish species in Blackstrap Lake include walleye, yellow perch, northern pike, burbot, white sucker, and whitefish.

== Gallery ==
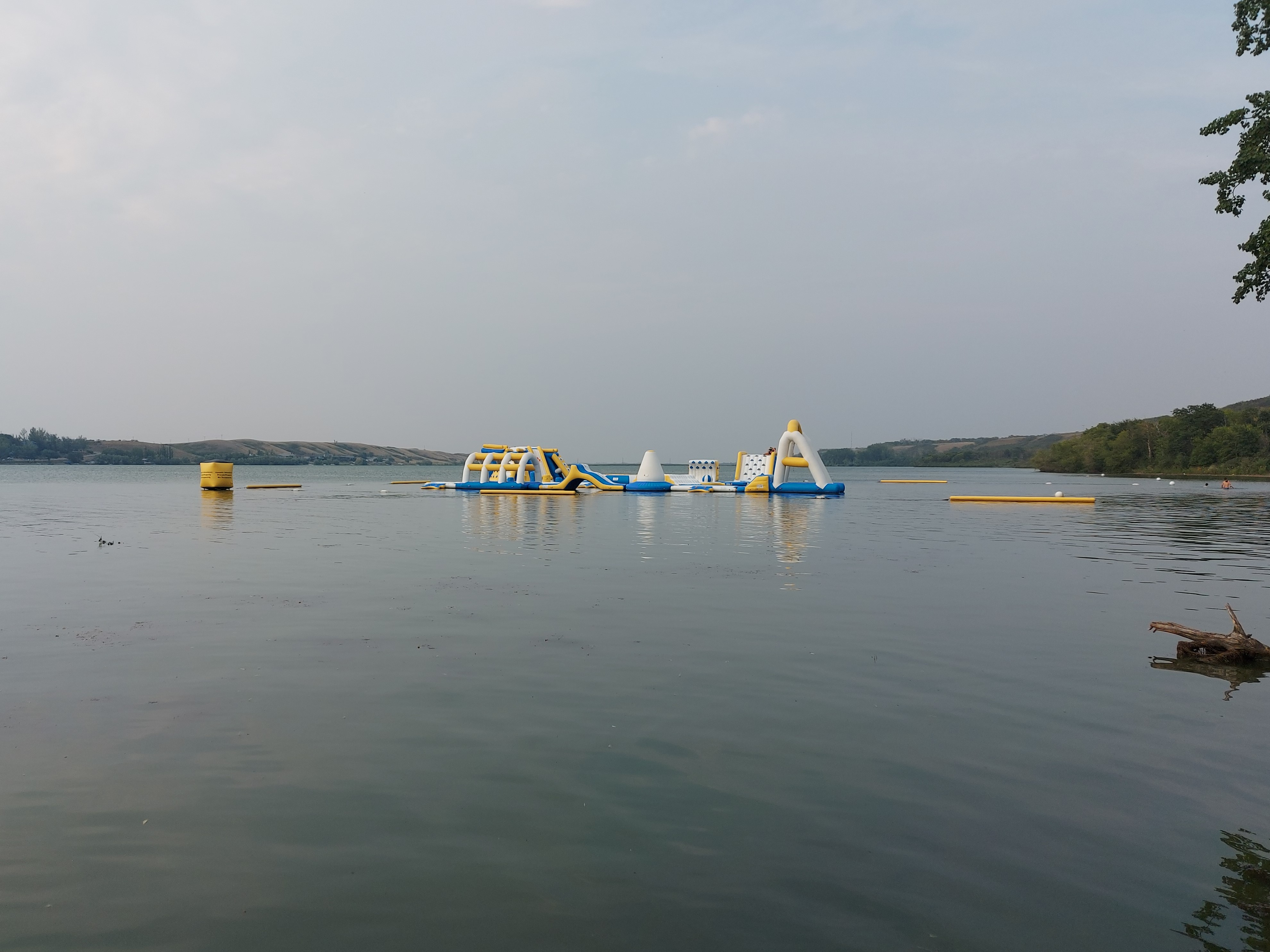
Sask Aquatic Adventures

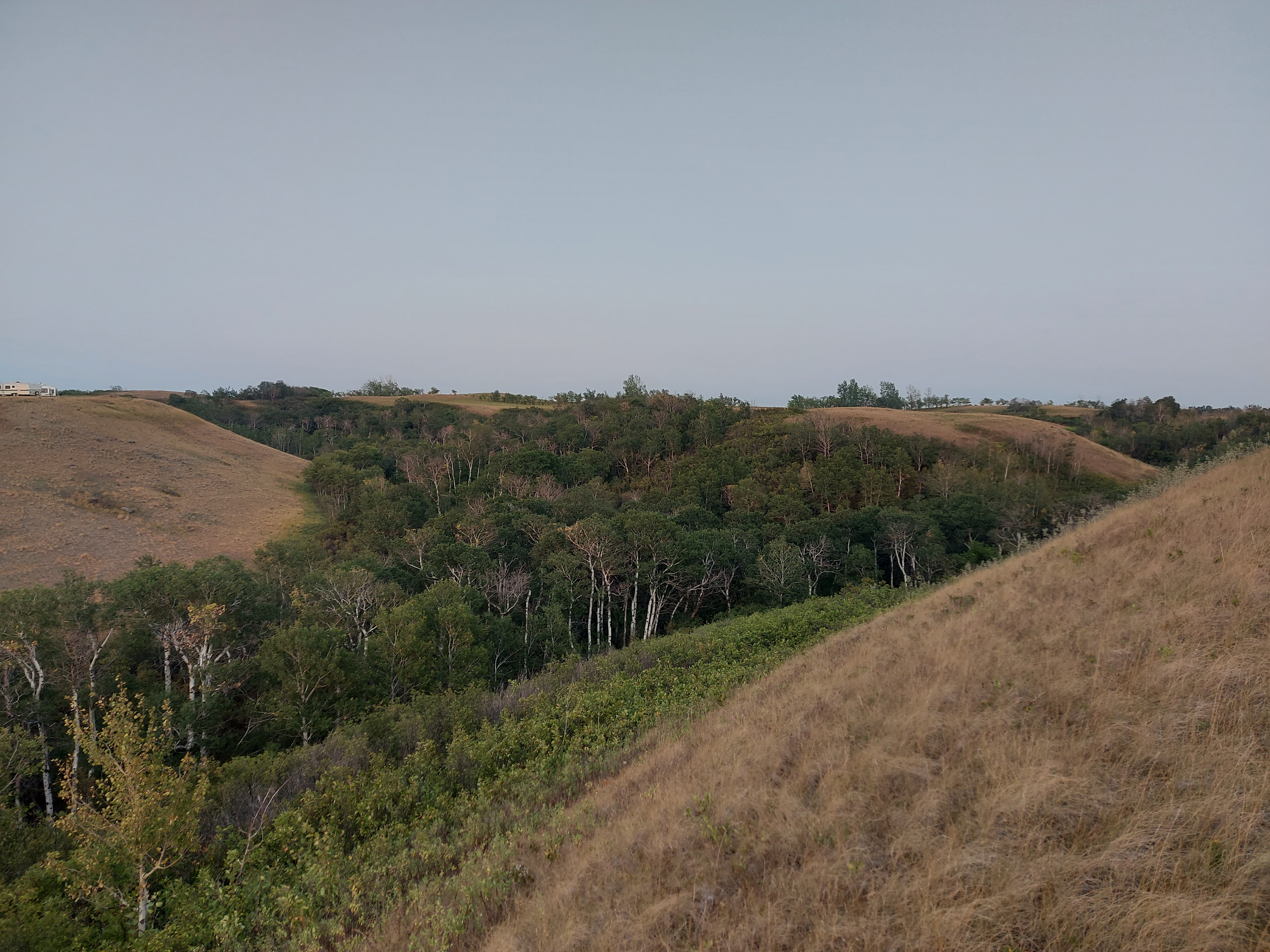
Coulee beside Sunset Ridge Campground

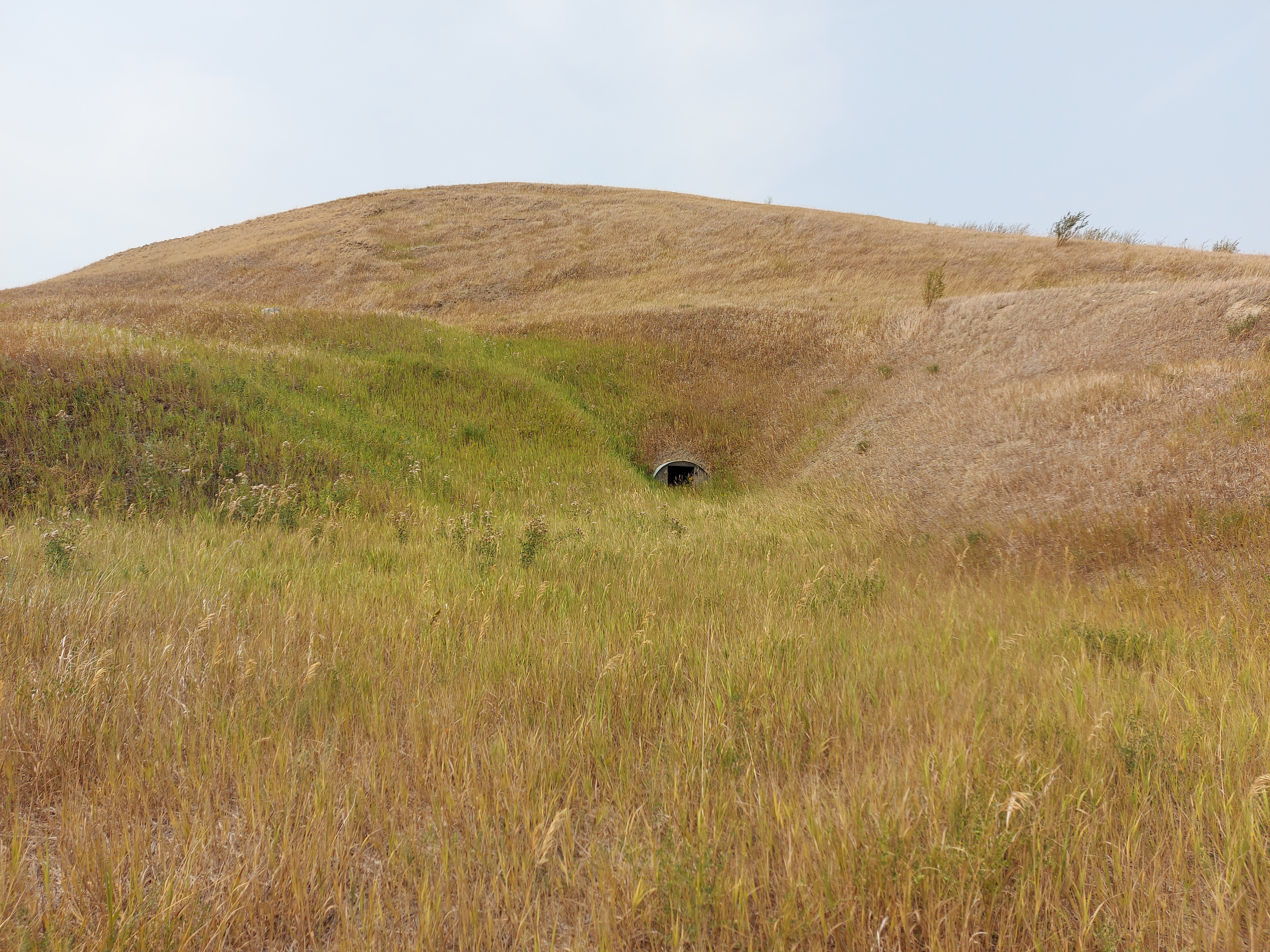
Abandoned service tunnel, Mount Blackstrap

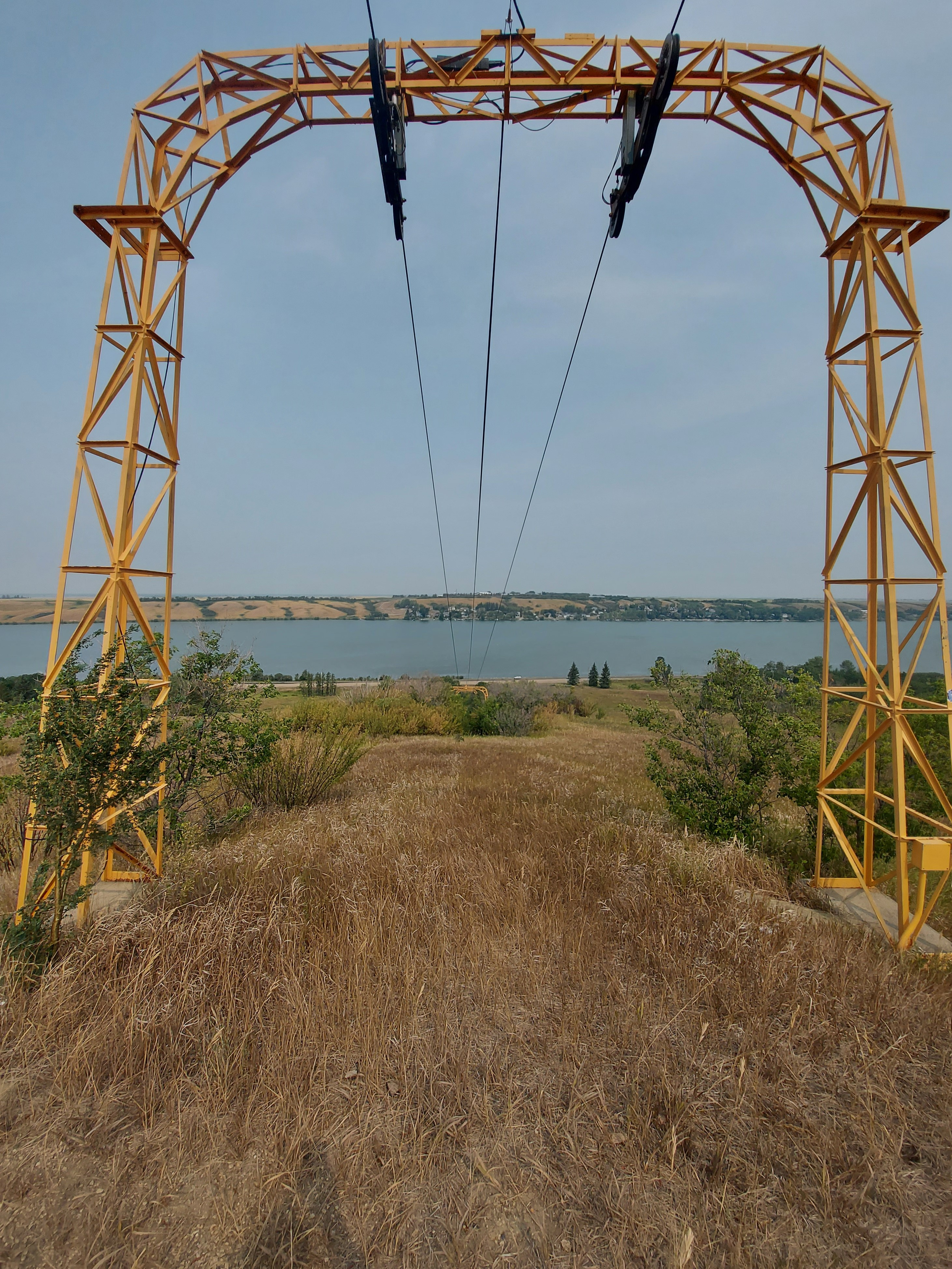
Abandoned ski lift, Mount Blackstrap

== See also ==
- List of protected areas of Saskatchewan
- Tourism in Saskatchewan
