= List of highways numbered 215 =

Route 215 or Highway 215 may refer to:

== Argentina ==
- Buenos Aires Provincial Route 215

== Canada ==
- Manitoba Provincial Road 215
- New Brunswick Route 215
- Nova Scotia Route 215
- Prince Edward Island Route 215
- Quebec Route 215

== Chile ==
- Route 215-CH in Los Lagos Region

== China ==
- China National Highway 215

== Costa Rica ==
- National Route 215

== Ireland ==
- R215 road (Ireland)

== Germany ==
- Bundesautobahn 215 (A 215)
- Bundesstraße 215 (B 215)

== India ==
- National Highway 215 (India)

== United Kingdom ==
- A215 road
- B215 road

== United States ==
- Interstate 215 (California)
- Interstate 215 (Nevada)
- Interstate 215 (Utah)
- Alabama State Route 215
- Arkansas Highway 215
- California State Route 215 (former)
- Clark County 215
- Florida State Road 215 (former)
- Georgia State Route 215
- Iowa Highway 215 (former)
- K-215 (Kansas highway)
- Kentucky Route 215
- Maine State Route 215
- M-215 (Michigan highway) (former)
- Missouri Route 215
- Montana Secondary Highway 215
- New Mexico State Road 215
- New York State Route 215
- North Carolina Highway 215
- Ohio State Route 215
- Oregon Route 215 (former)
- Pennsylvania Route 215
- South Carolina Highway 215
- Tennessee State Route 215
- Texas State Highway 215 (former)
  - Texas State Highway Spur 215
- Utah State Route 215 (former)
- Vermont Route 215
- Virginia State Route 215
- Washington State Route 215
- Wyoming Highway 215

Preceded by 214	Lists of highways 215	Succeeded by 216
