= Utah State Route 207 =

Utah State Route 207 may refer to:

- Utah State Route 207 (1945-1968), a former state highway in eastern Uintah County, Utah, United States
- Utah State Route 207 (1941-1945)
