= List of highways numbered 212 =

Route 212 or Highway 212 can refer to:

== Canada ==
- Manitoba Provincial Road 212
- Newfoundland and Labrador Route 212
- Nova Scotia Route 212
- Prince Edward Island Route 212
- Quebec Route 212
- Saskatchewan Highway 212

== China ==
- China National Highway 212

== Costa Rica ==
- National Route 212

== India ==
- National Highway 212

== Ireland ==
- R212 regional road

== Japan ==
- Japan National Route 212

== United Kingdom ==
- A212 road
- B212 road

== United States ==
- U.S. Route 212
- Alabama State Route 212
- California State Route 212 (former)
- Florida State Road 212
- Georgia State Route 212
- Iowa Highway 212
- K-212 (Kansas highway)
- Kentucky Route 212
- Maine State Route 212
- Maryland Route 212
- M-212 (Michigan highway)
- Minnesota State Highway 212 (former)
- Montana Secondary Highway 212
- New Mexico State Road 212
- New York State Route 212
- North Carolina Highway 212
- Ohio State Route 212
- Oregon Route 212
- Pennsylvania Route 212
- South Carolina Highway 212
- Tennessee State Route 212
- Texas State Highway 212 (former)
- Utah State Route 212
- Virginia State Route 212
- Wyoming Highway 212

Territories

- Puerto Rico Highway 212

Preceded by 211	Lists of highways 212	Succeeded by 213
