= Virginia State Route 213 =

State highway in the City of Manassas Park, Virginia, US

State Route 213
- Manassas Drive

Route information
- Maintained by VDOT
- Length: 1.89 mi (3.04 km)
- Existed: mid-1970s–present

Major junctions
- West end: SR 1501 in Manassas Park
- East end: SR 28 in Manassas Park

Location
- Country: United States
- State: Virginia
- Counties: City of Manassas Park

Highway system
- Virginia Routes; Interstate; US; Primary; Secondary; Byways; History; HOT lanes
| ← SR 212 | → SR 214 |

State Route 213 (SR 213) is an unsigned primary state highway in the U.S. state of Virginia. Known as Manassas Drive, the state highway runs 1.89 miles (3.04 km) from the boundary between Manassas Park and Prince William County east to SR 28 in Manassas Park. SR 213 is the main east–west thoroughfare of the independent city of Manassas Park.

== Route description ==
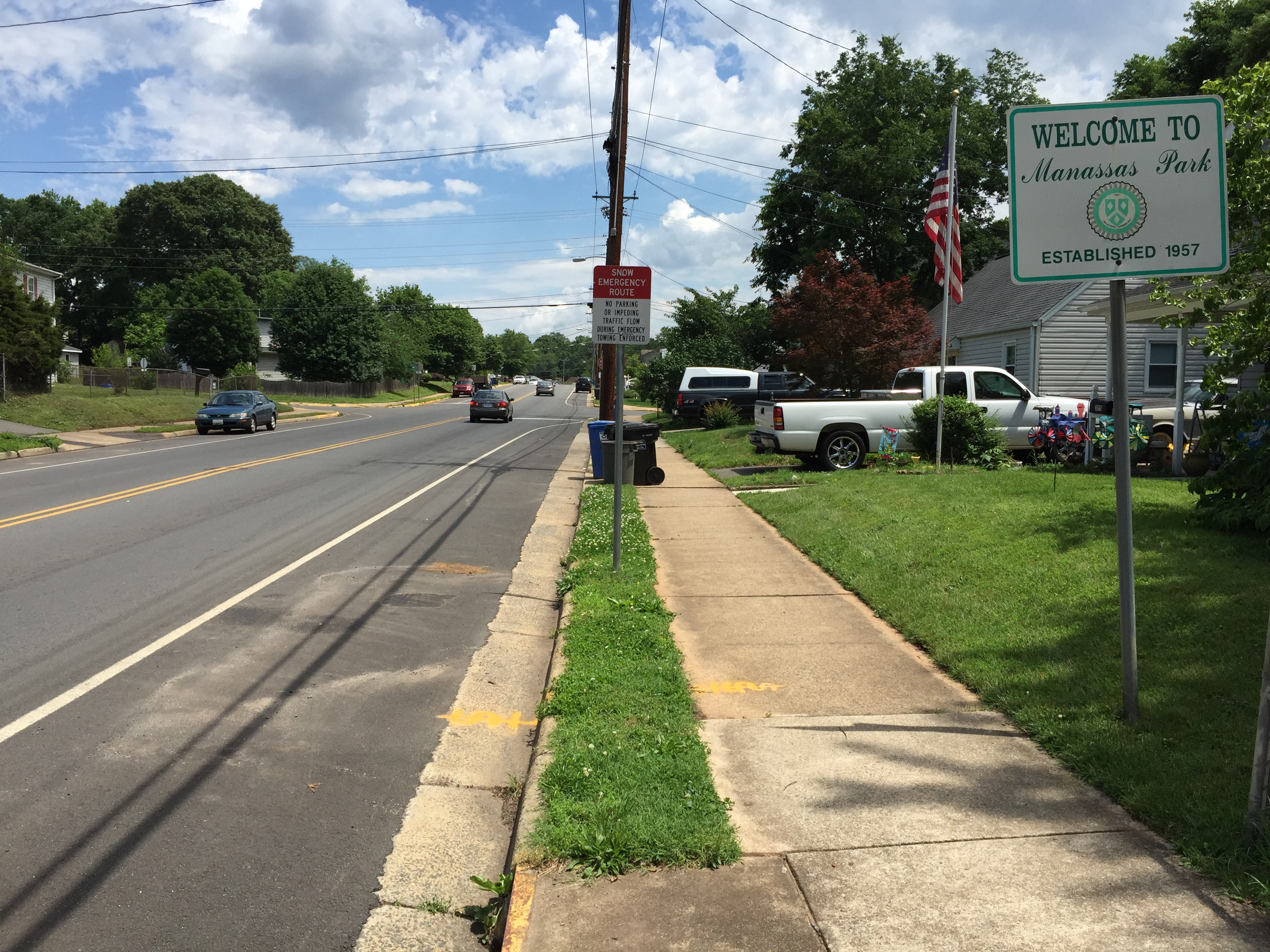
View east at the west end of SR 213 at SR 1501 in Manassas Park

SR 213 begins at the boundary between the city of Manassas Park and Prince William County to the west. Manassas Drive continues west a short distance as SR 1501 to Lomond Drive. The state highway heads east as a two-lane undivided road that winds its way through several residential neighborhoods in the city. SR 213 reaches its eastern terminus at SR 28 (Centreville Road). Manassas Drive continues east as an unnumbered four-lane divided highway that serves the industrial side of town near the Manassas Park Virginia Railway Express station.

== Major intersections ==
The entire route is in Manassas Park.

| mi | km | Destinations | Notes |
|---|---|---|---|
| 0.00 | 0.00 | SR 1501 (Manassas Drive) | Manassas Park – Prince William County boundary; western terminus |
| 1.89 | 3.04 | SR 28 (Centreville Road) | Eastern terminus |
1.000 mi = 1.609 km; 1.000 km = 0.621 mi
