= Saskatchewan Highway 211 =

Provincial highway in Saskatchewan, Canada

Highway 211

Route information
- Maintained by Ministry of Highways and Infrastructure
- Length: 6.5 km (4.0 mi)

Major junctions
- West end: Highway 11 at Dundurn
- East end: Blackstrap Provincial Park

Location
- Country: Canada
- Province: Saskatchewan
- Rural municipalities: Dundurn

Highway system
- Provincial highways in Saskatchewan
← Highway 210	→ Highway 212

Highway 211 is a provincial highway in the Canadian province of Saskatchewan. Saskatchewan's 200-series highways primarily service its recreational areas. It connects Highway 11 near Dundurn to the main access road for Blackstrap Provincial Park and Township Road 330. The highway is a narrow, paved two-lane road for its entire length and has a 90 km/h (56 mph) speed limit. It is approximately 6.5 kilometres (4.0 mi) long.

== Major intersections ==
From west to east:

Rural municipality	Location	km	mi	Destinations	Notes
Dundurn No. 314	Dundurn	0.0	0.0	Highway 11 (Louis Riel Trail) – Saskatoon, Regina; Clark Street – Dundurn	
Dundurn No. 314		1.3	0.81	Highway 663 (Range Road 3044) – Shields, Thode	
Dundurn No. 314		4.3– 4.7	2.7– 2.9	Township Road 331 – Shields	
Dundurn No. 314		5.3	3.3	Range Road 3040 – Thode	
Dundurn No. 314		6.1– 6.5	3.8– 4.0	Crosses Blackstrap Lake	
Dundurn No. 314		6.5	4.0	Blackstrap Provincial Park access road	Continues eastward as Township Road 330
1.000 mi = 1.609 km; 1.000 km = 0.621 mi

== See also ==
- Transportation in Saskatchewan
- Roads in Saskatchewan
