= Utah State Route 214 =

State Route 214

Location
- Country: United States
- State: Utah

Highway system
- Utah State Highway System; Interstate; US; State; Minor; Scenic
← SR-213	→ SR-215

Utah State Route 214 may refer to:

- Utah State Route 214 (1941–1953), a former state highway legislative overlay for US-191 in northeastern Juab County and southwestern Utah County, Utah, United States that ran northerly from SR-1 (US-91) in Mona through Goshen Canyon to SR-26 in Goshen
- Utah State Route 214 (1962–1995), a former state highway in southeastern Utah County, Utah, United States that ran northwesterly within Spanish Fork from SR-105 (a point that is currently the junction of US-6 and SR-198) to I-15

== See also ==
- List of state highways in Utah
- List of highways numbered 214
