= Interstate 210 =

Interstate 210 may refer to:

- Interstate 210 (California) or the Foothill Freeway, a major east–west freeway running through the valleys north and east of Los Angeles
- Interstate 210 (Louisiana), a bypass route in Lake Charles
- Interstate 310 (Mississippi), a proposed freeway in Biloxi, originally proposed as Interstate 210
- Interstate 165 in Mobile, Alabama, previously designated as Interstate 210
