= Virginia State Route 214 =

State highway in Westmoreland County, Virginia, US

State Route 214
- Stratford Hall Road

Route information
- Maintained by VDOT
- Length: 2.48 mi (3.99 km)
- Existed: 1933–present
- Tourist routes: Virginia Byway

Major junctions
- West end: SR 3 at Lerty
- East end: SR 609 near Bryant Town

Location
- Country: United States
- State: Virginia
- Counties: Westmoreland

Highway system
- Virginia Routes; Interstate; US; Primary; Secondary; Byways; History; HOT lanes
← SR 213	→ SR 215

State Route 214 (SR 214) is a primary state highway in the U.S. state of Virginia. Known as Stratford Hall Road, the state highway runs 2.48 miles (3.99 km) from SR 3 at Lerty northeast to SR 609 near Bryant Town in northern Westmoreland County. SR 214 provides access to Stratford Hall, the birthplace of Robert E. Lee.

SR 214 is a Virginia Byway.

== Route description ==
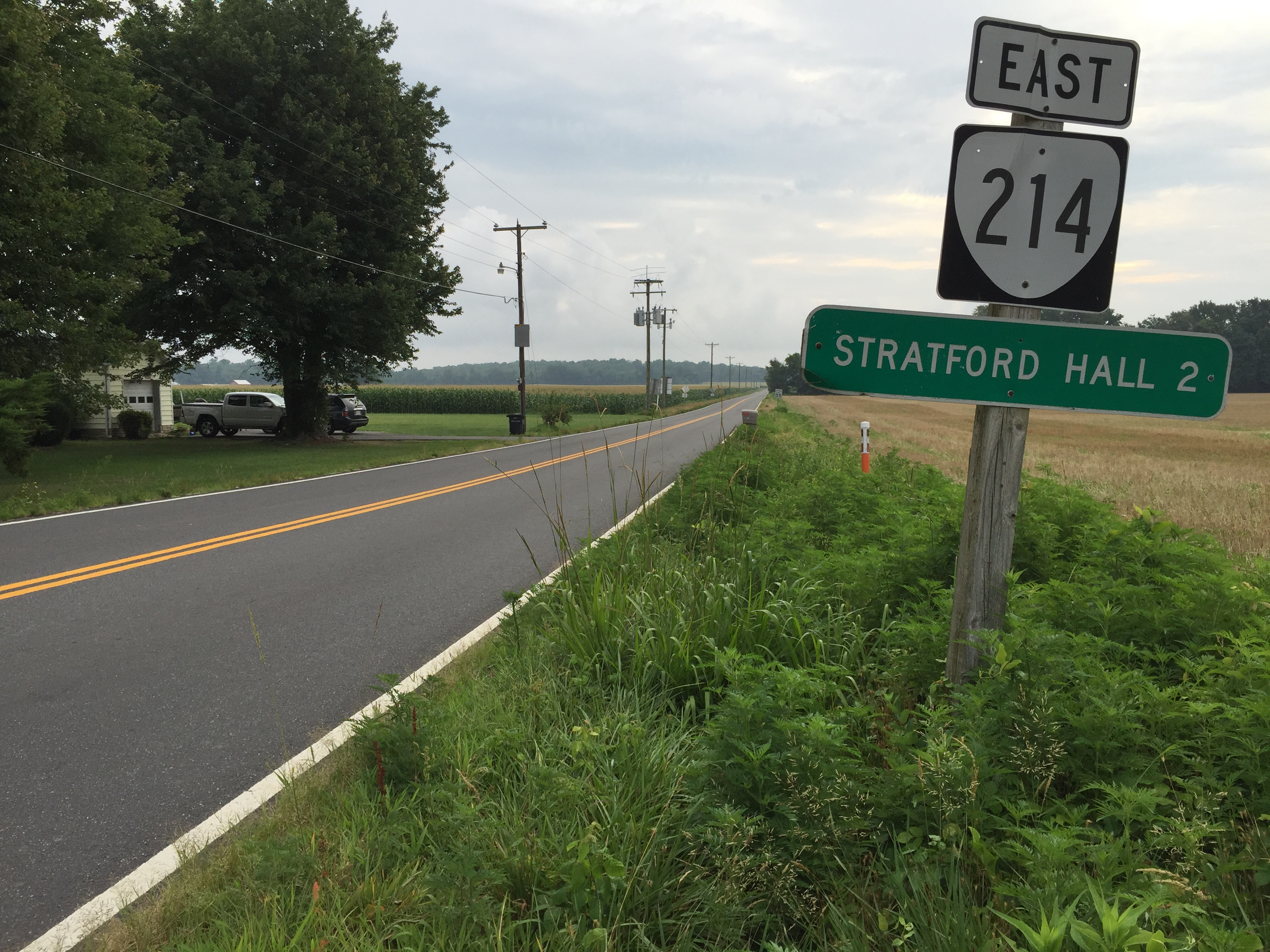
View east at the west end of SR 214 at SR 3 in Lerty

SR 214 begins at an intersection with SR 3 (Kings Highway) at Lerty. The state highway heads east and passes to the south of the Stratford Hall property, which is accessed by Great House Road. At SR 644 (Wild Sally Road), SR 214 veers northeast and reaches its eastern terminus at an arbitrary point east of Stratford Hall. Stratford Hall Road continues northeast as SR 609 through the hamlet of Bryant Town.

== Major intersections ==
The entire route is in Westmoreland County.

Location	mi	km	Destinations	Notes
Lerty	0.00	0.00	SR 3 (Kings Highway) – Warsaw, Kilmarnock, Fredericksburg	Western terminus
			Stratford Hall	
	2.48	3.99	SR 609 (Stratford Hall Road)	Eastern terminus
1.000 mi = 1.609 km; 1.000 km = 0.621 mi

< SR 619	District 6 State Routes; 1928–1933	SR 621 >
