= Tourism in Memphis, Tennessee =

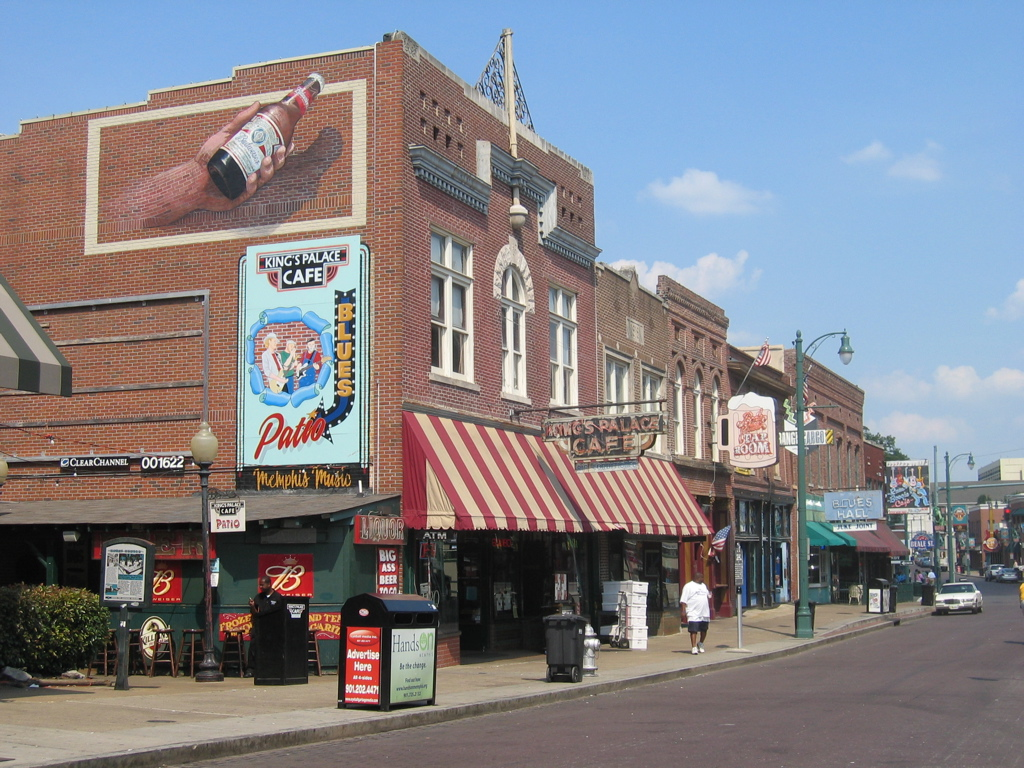
Beale Street (2006)

Tourism in Memphis includes the points of interest in Memphis, Tennessee such as museums, fine art galleries, and parks, as well as Graceland (the former home of Elvis Presley) the Beale Street entertainment district, and sporting events (see Sports in Memphis, Tennessee).

The Memphis Brooks Museum of Art, founded in 1916, is the oldest and largest fine art museum in the state of Tennessee. A smaller art museum, the Dixon Gallery and Gardens in east Memphis focuses on impressionism. Downtown Memphis is home to the Peabody Place Museum, the largest collection of 19th-century Chinese art in the nation.

Graceland, the home of Rock 'n' Roll legend Elvis Presley, is one of the most visited houses in the United States (after the White House and Biltmore Estate), attracting over 600,000 domestic and international visitors a year.

== Art collections ==
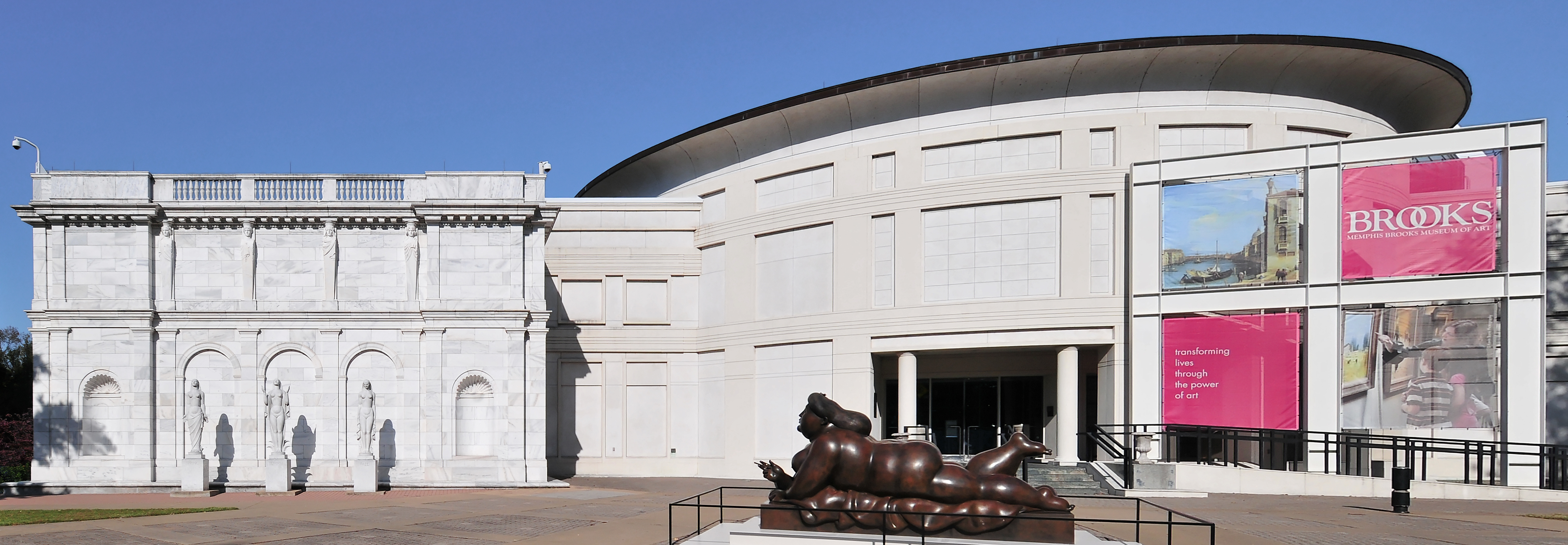
Memphis Brooks Museum of Art (2008)

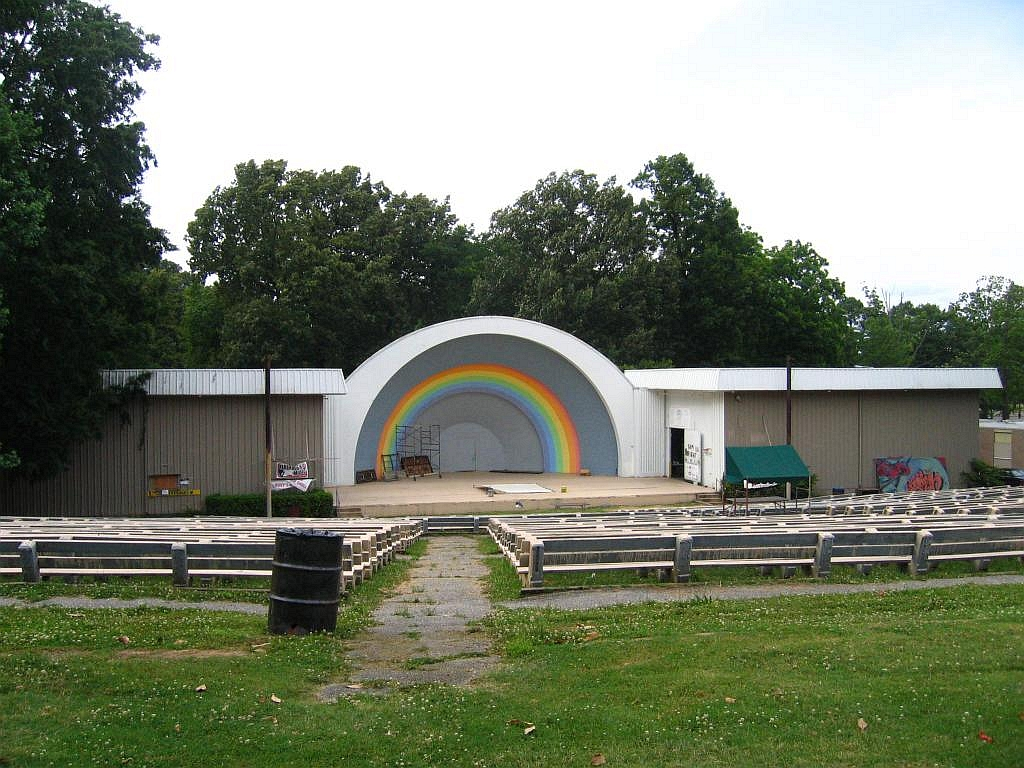
Overton Park Shell (2006)

=== Art Museum at the University of Memphis ===
The Art Museum at the University of Memphis is home to the largest collection of Egyptian antiquities in the South.

=== Brooks Museum of Art ===
The Memphis Brooks Museum of Art, founded in 1916, is the oldest and largest fine art museum in the state of Tennessee. The Brooks' permanent collection includes works from the Italian Renaissance and Baroque eras to British, French Impressionists, and 20th century artists (including regional artists like Memphian Carroll Cloar). It is located in Overton Park, which is also home to the Memphis Zoo, the Overton Shell Auditorium, and the Memphis College of Art.

=== Dixon Gallery and Gardens ===
A smaller art museum, the Dixon Gallery and Gardens in east Memphis focuses on impressionism and has several works by Monet, Degas and Renoir. It also includes four outdoor gardens with Greco-Roman sculptures.

=== Peabody Place Museum ===
Downtown Memphis is home to the Peabody Place Museum, the largest collection of 19th-century Chinese art in the nation.

== Museums ==
- Media related to Museums in Memphis, Tennessee at Wikimedia Commons

=== Children's Museum of Memphis ===
The Children's Museum of Memphis offers interactive and educational activities for children to take part in. Permanent exhibits include a skyscraper maze, an airplane cockpit (donated by FedEx), a fire engine, an art studio, grocery store, and, most recently, a mechanic's garage sponsored by AutoZone, Inc.

=== Cotton Museum ===
The Cotton Museum is a museum that opened in March 2006 on the old trading floor of the Memphis Cotton Exchange at 65 Union Avenue in downtown Memphis.

The mission of the Cotton Museum at the Memphis Cotton Exchange is to share the story of the cotton industry and its many influences on the daily life, arts, and the development of this region. The museum highlights artifacts through interpretive exhibits, educational programs, and research archives that help tell the story of cotton and cotton trading, from crop to becoming fabric.

The Cotton Museum preserves the history of the cotton business and its impact on economics, history, society and culture, and science & technology. It is a field trip for middle schoolers and older, and a great beginning for tourists, giving visitors context for other attractions in the city.

=== Graceland ===
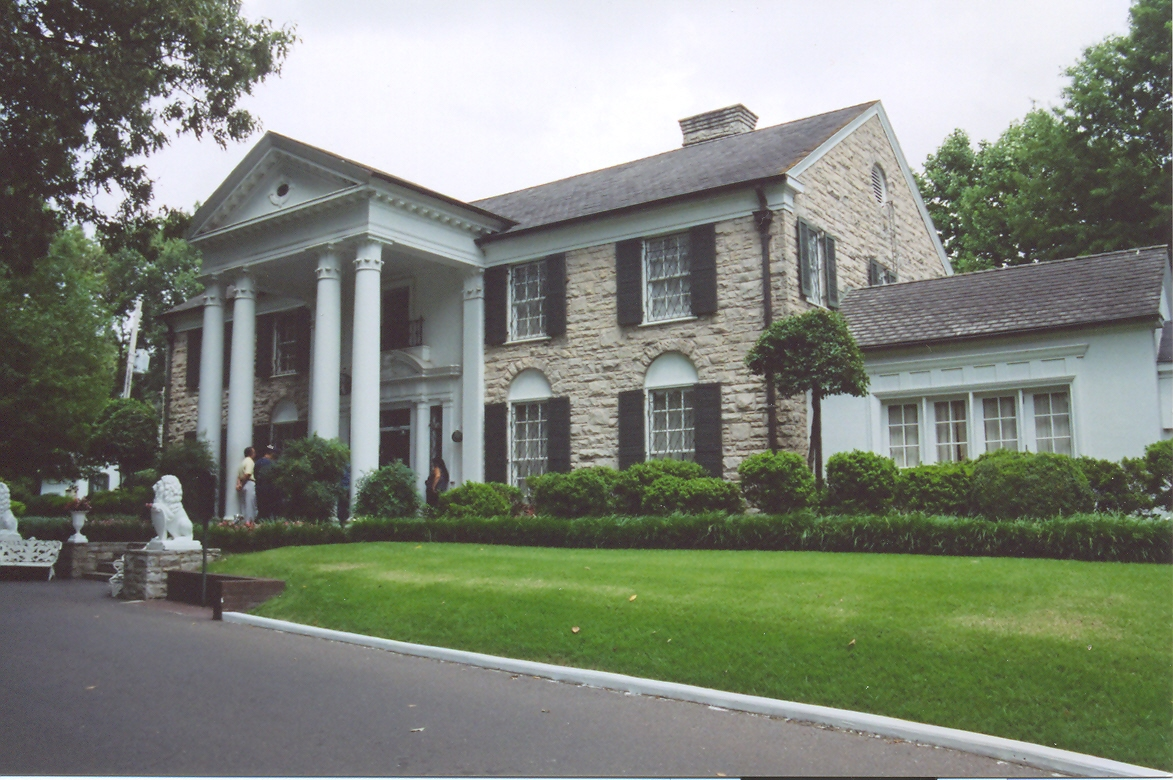
Graceland Mansion (2002)

The Graceland Property includes Graceland Mansion™, Elvis Presley's Memphis™, The Guest House at Graceland™ and is planning on further expansions within the property.

1) The Graceland Mansion™, former home of Rock 'n' Roll legend Elvis Presley, is the second-most visited house in the United States after the White House, attracting over 650,000 domestic and international visitors a year.

The tombstones of Elvis, his mother Gladys, his father Vernon and his paternal grandmother Minnie Mae Presley are located in the Meditation Garden next to the mansion, along with a plaque commemorating Elvis' stillborn twin brother Jess(i)e Garon Presley. The Meditation Garden can be visited either during a mansion tour or for free before the mansion tours.

2) A large entertainment and exhibit complex, Elvis Presley's Memphis™, across the street from the mansion, was inaugurated on March 2, 2017. It features two of Presley's private airplanes, his extensive automobile and motorcycle collection, other Elvis memorabilia, plus shops and restaurants:

"The $45 million, 200,000-square-foot entertainment and museum complex is the second phase of Graceland's expansion plans. It features a new Elvis Presley career museum, the "Presley Motors" automobile museum, a 20,000-square-foot "Graceland Soundstage" performing space/meeting hall, a barbecue restaurant, a 1950s-inspired diner and retail stores."

3) The Heartbreak Hotel (1999-2016), which was located across the street from the mansion, is now closed.

Graceland’s new, world-class, 450-room resort, The Guest House at Graceland™, opened on October 27, 2016, at walking distance from the mansion, on the same side of the street. It includes "two full-service restaurants, over 17,000 sq.-ft. of meeting/function space for weddings and events, plus a 464-seat theater for live performances and group events".

Celebrations at Graceland include the annual Graceland Christmas lighting ceremony in November, Elvis' birthday in January and Elvis Week in August, commemorating Presley's life and career on the anniversary of his death.

Graceland Mansion™ was listed in the National Register of Historic Places on November 7, 1991, and designated a National Historic Landmark on March 27, 2006

=== National Civil Rights Museum ===
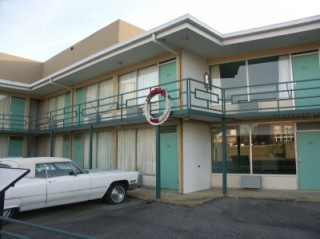
Lorraine Motel in Memphis (2005)

Many museums of interest are located in Memphis, including the National Civil Rights Museum, located in the former Lorraine Motel where Martin Luther King Jr. was assassinated. It includes a historical overview of the American civil rights movement, ranging from the abolishment of slavery to more modern themes such the LGBT movement. On Martin Luther King Jr. Day, a yearly parade and celebration happens outside the room where Martin Luther King Jr. was shot.

=== National Ornamental Metal Museum ===
The National Ornamental Metal Museum is the only museum in North America dedicated to the preservation and exhibition of fine metalwork. The site is situated on a bluff overlooking the Mississippi River and includes historic buildings, a working blacksmith shop and foundry, and a sculpture garden.

Every October, the Museum hosts an annual Repair Days Weekend, during which the public can get broken metal items fixed and observe skilled metalsmiths at work.

=== Pink Palace Museum ===
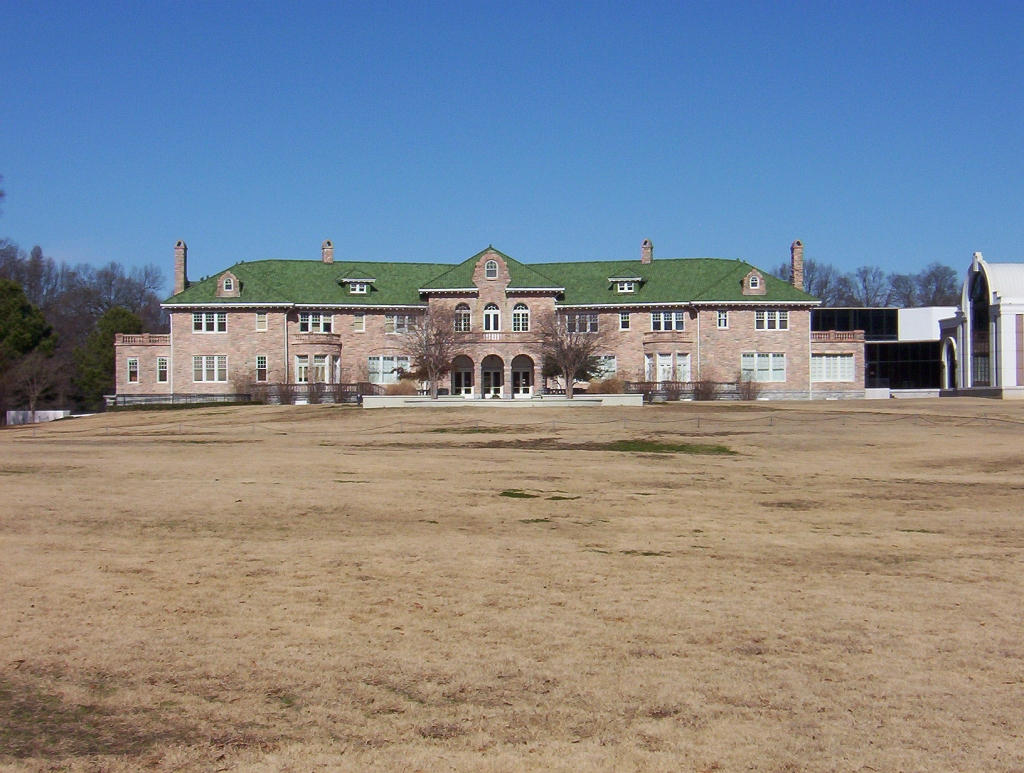
Pink Palace Museum (2008)

The Pink Palace Museum and Planetarium, serves as the Mid-South's major science and historical museum, and features exhibits ranging from archeology to chemistry. It includes America's third largest planetarium and an IMAX Theatre.

The Pink Palace also contains a variety of exhibits relating to Memphis history. One exhibit features a replica of the original Piggly Wiggly store, the first self-service grocery store, commemorating the invention of the supermarket by Memphian Clarence Saunders in 1916.

=== Stax Museum ===
Also commemorating the city's musical heritage, the Stax Museum of American Soul Music is home to a broad collection of artifacts, photographs, exhibits, commentary, and music. Along with the legendary Stax Sound, the museum also spotlights the music of Muscle Shoals, Motown, Hi and Atlantic.

=== Sun Studio ===
Sun studio was where Elvis first recorded "My Happiness" and "That's When Your Heartaches Begin". Other famous musicians who got their start at Sun include Johnny Cash, Rufus Thomas, Charlie Rich, Howlin' Wolf, Roy Orbison, Carl Perkins, and Jerry Lee Lewis.

=== Memphis Rock ‘n’ Soul Museum ===
Memphis Rock N' Soul Museum tells the critical story of the musical pioneers who overcame racial and socio-economic obstacles to create the music that changed the cultural complexion of the world.

=== Other museums ===
Other museums in the area include the Fire Museum of Memphis and Memphis Railroad & Trolley Museum.

== Other attractions ==
=== Beale Street ===
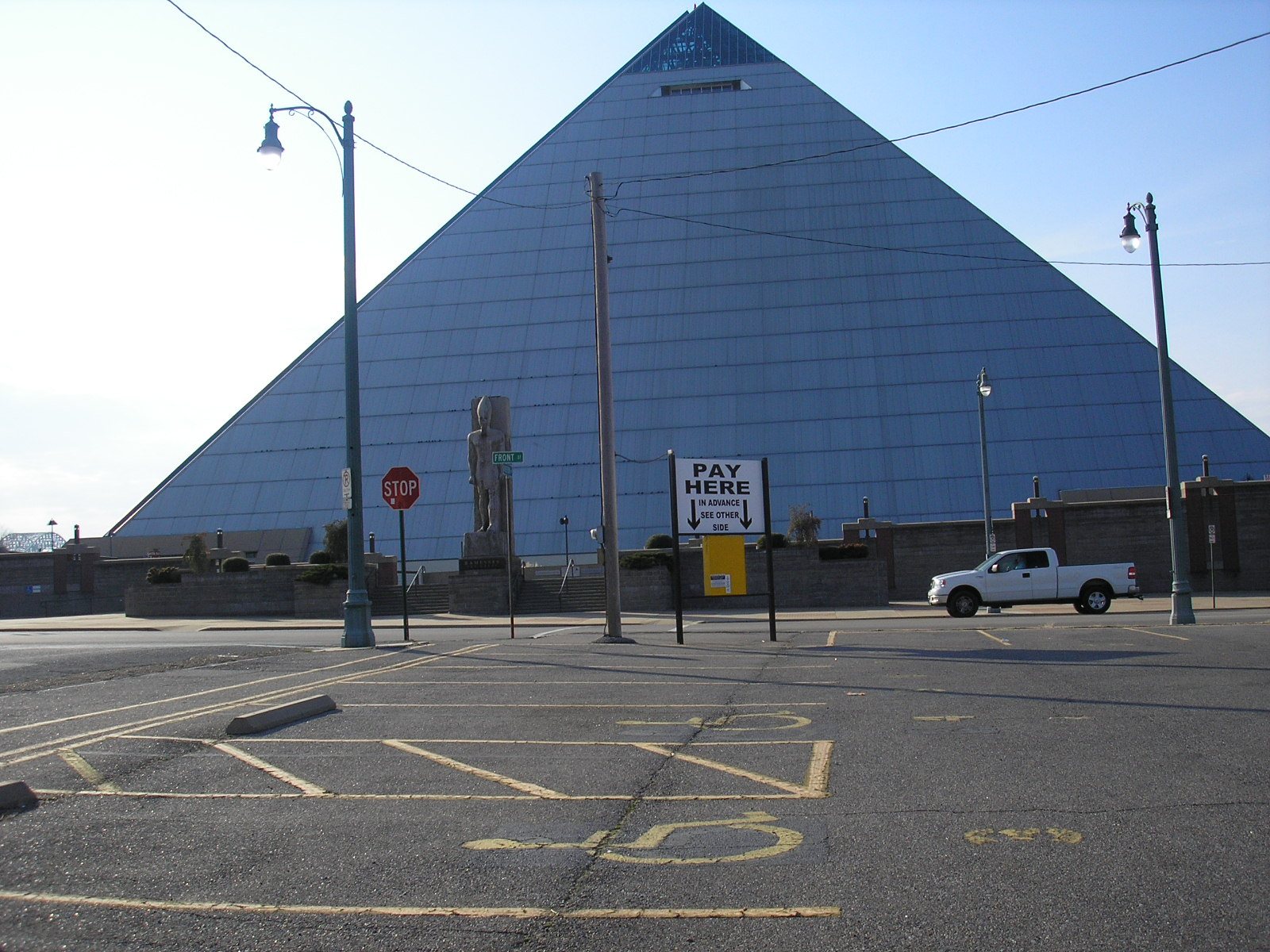
Pyramid Arena (2006)

Blues fans can visit Beale Street, where a young B.B. King used to play his guitar. In his later years he occasionally still appeared there at the club bearing his name, which he partially owned. Street performers play live music, and bars and clubs feature live entertainment around the clock.

=== Center for Southern Folklore ===
The Center for Southern Folklore highlights southern artists and musicians through public performances and exhibitions. The center's archival collections contain thousands of photographs, recordings, and films. The Memphis Music and Heritage Festival, held each Labor Day weekend, is hosted and organized by the center.

=== Gibson Guitar Factory ===
The Gibson Guitar Factory & Showcase is a guitar manufacturing plant where visitors can learn how the Gibsons are made. Famous Gibson musicians include B. B. King, Les Paul, Chuck Berry, Carl Perkins, and Scotty Moore.

=== Live From Memphis ===
Live From Memphis highlights local artists, musicians, and filmmakers through various public events and online. The Music Video Showcase, held each October in conjunction with the Indie Memphis Film Festival, is hosted an organized by Live From Memphis, as is the Li'l Film Fest, a quarterly themed-based festival.

=== Memphis Walk of Fame ===
The Memphis Walk of Fame is a public exhibit located in the Beale Street historic district, which is modelled after the Hollywood Walk of Fame, but is designated exclusively for Memphis musicians, singers, writers, and composers. Honorees include W. C. Handy, B. B. King, Bobby Blue Bland, and Alberta Hunter among others.

=== Memphis Zoo ===
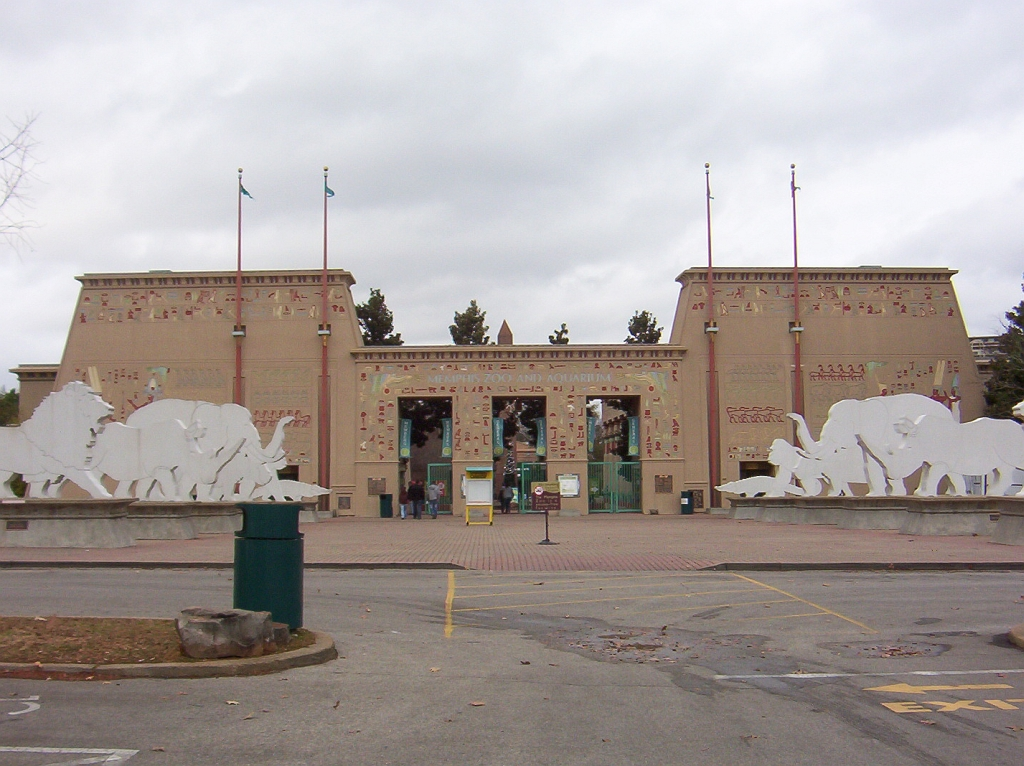
Memphis Zoo (2008)

The Memphis Zoo, which is located in midtown Memphis, features many exhibits of mammals, birds, fish, and amphibians from all over the world. The most popular exhibits are The Northwest Passage with an above and below the water viewed Polar Bear exhibit, The Teton Trek and the zoo's panda exhibit, which is one of only a handful in North America.

=== Mud Island River Park ===
The Mud Island River Park (which contains the Mississippi River Museum) is located on Mud Island in downtown Memphis. The Park is noted for its River Walk. The River walk is a 1:2112 scale working model showing 1000 mi (1600 km) of the Lower Mississippi River, from Cairo, Illinois to New Orleans, Louisiana and the Gulf of Mexico. 30 in (75 cm) in the model equal 1 mi (1.6 km) of the Mississippi River.

The Walk stretches roughly 0.5 mi (800 m), allowing visitors to walk in the water and see models of cities and bridges along the way. The Gulf of Mexico section was once used as a waterpark named Bud Boogie Beach. The museum offers 18 galleries of regional history and features an indoor life-size replica of a civil war era riverboat.

=== Victorian village ===
Victorian Village is a historic district of Memphis featuring a series of fine Victorian-era mansions, some of which are open to the public as museums.

=== Other points of interest ===
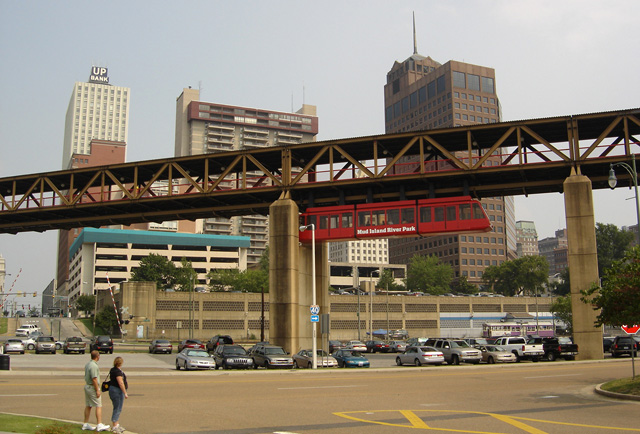
Mud Island monorail (2005)

Adventure River Water Park in the Eastern part of the city and Libertyland Amusement Park, formerly located at the Midsouth Fairgrounds, have been closed. The Libertyland rides were sold after a long legal battle.

Maywood Beach, a water park in Memphis suburb of Olive Branch, Mississippi, closed in 2003. This left the entire metro area without a Water park or Amusement park.

Other Memphis attractions include the Liberty Bowl Memorial Stadium (also at the Midsouth Fairgrounds), Mud Island, Detour Memphis - an art and performing space, the Pyramid Arena, FedExForum, and the Memphis Queen riverboat cruises.

In April 2015, The Memphis Pyramid re-opened as the Bass Pro Shop, Pyramid. More than just a store; the Bass Pro Pyramid includes a bowling alley, an archery range, restaurants, a 100-room hotel and a Big Cypress Lodge. The New Bass Pro Pyramid is a part of the city's downtown revitalization efforts.

Black Lodge Video, a DVD rental store and longtime staple among cinephiles in Memphis, recently moved from its original location in the Cooper-Young neighborhood to the Crosstown community. Its owner, Matt Martin, boasts of 30,000 hand picked titles from cult classics to blockbusters. Martin and his business were thanked in the end credits to Craig Brewer's Academy Award-winning film Hustle & Flow.

== Parks, gardens, and cemeteries ==
Media related to Parks in Memphis, Tennessee at Wikimedia Commons, Media related to Cemeteries in Memphis, Tennessee at Wikimedia Commons

Major Memphis parks include W.C. Handy Park, Riverfront Park, Tom Lee Park, Audubon Park, Overton Park including the Old Forest Arboretum of Overton Park, the Lichterman Nature Center - a nature learning center and the Memphis Botanic Garden. Shelby Farms park, located at the eastern edge of the city, is one of the largest urban parks in America.

Historic Elmwood Cemetery, one of the first rural garden cemeteries in the South, contains the Carlisle S. Page Arboretum. Forrest Park, Confederate Park, and Jefferson Davis Park are three controversial parks that reflect the Civil War era. The Memphis Parkway System, connecting Martin Luther King Riverside Park and Overton Park, was designed and built at the beginning of the 20th century.

The Memphis National Cemetery is a United States National Cemetery located in north Memphis. Memorial Park Cemetery contains work by the Mexican sculptor Dionicio Rodriguez.

== Performing arts ==
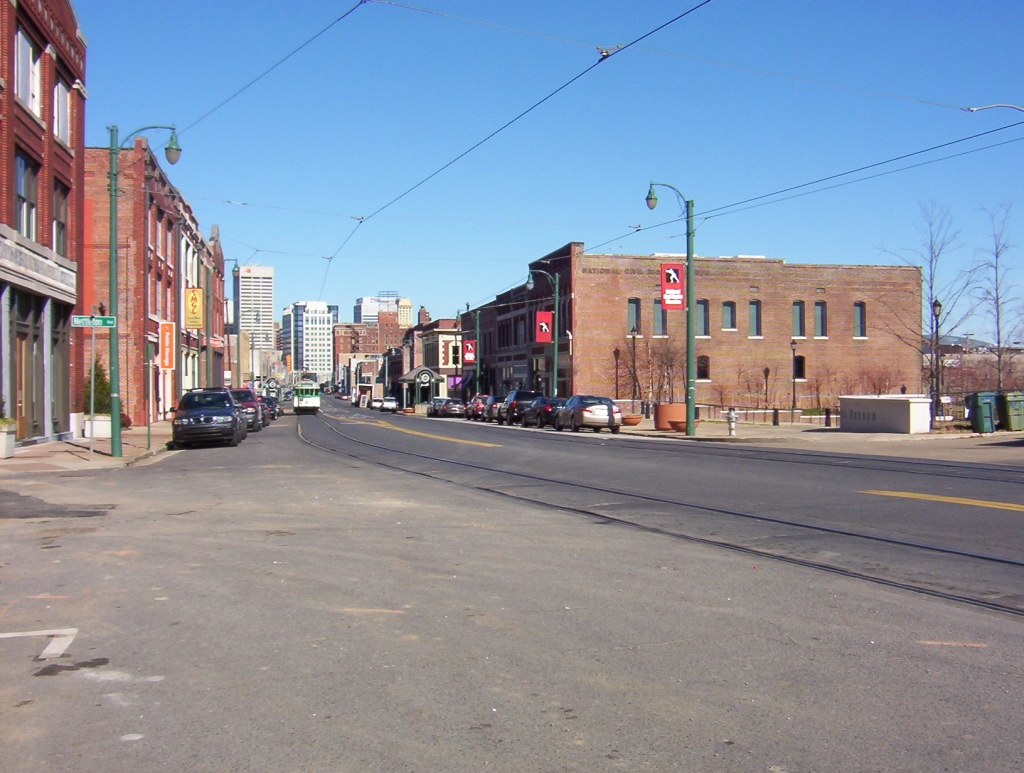
South Main Arts District (2008)

The Memphis area is home to many of West Tennessee's larger performing arts organizations, such as the Memphis Symphony Orchestra, which performs at the Cannon Center for the Performing Arts downtown.

Ballet Memphis is the region's only professional ballet company and performs at the Orpheum Theatre. The Ford Foundation awarded Ballet Memphis one of its prestigious challenge grants in 2001, and has praised the organization as a national treasure of the cultural world. Opera Memphis, the region's opera company, performs at the Clark Opera Memphis Center in East Memphis.

Other major theatres in the city include Playhouse on the Square, Circuit Playhouse, Theatre Memphis, and Theatre Works. The Memphis Comedy & Improv Alliance provides information on improvised and comedy performances throughout the area.
