= List of museums in Tennessee =

This list of museums in Tennessee encompasses museums defined for this context as institutions (including nonprofit organizations, government entities, and private businesses) that collect and care for objects of cultural, artistic, scientific, or historical interest and make their collections or related exhibits available for public viewing. Museums that exist only in cyberspace (i.e., virtual museums) are not included.

== Museums ==
Name	Location	County	Region	Type	Other Information
Abraham Lincoln Library and Museum	Harrogate	Claiborne	East	Biographical	Part of Lincoln Memorial University, Lincoln memorabilia and Civil War history and artifacts
Adventure Science Center	Nashville	Davidson	Middle	Science	Over 175 hands-on science exhibits
Alcatraz East	Pigeon Forge	Sevier County	East	Crime museum	Formerly operated as the National Museum of Crime & Punishment in Washington, D.C., the museum is dedicated to the history of criminology and penology in the United States.
Alex Haley House and Museum	Henning	Lauderdale	West	Historic house	Home and the burial place of author Alex Haley
American Museum of Science and Energy	Oak Ridge	Anderson	East	Science	Focus is on energy, especially nuclear power
Andrew Johnson National Historic Site	Greeneville	Greene	East	Historic house	Home and museum of President Andrew Johnson
Archie Campbell Tourism Complex	Bulls Gap	Hawkings	East	Biographical	Home and museum of comedian Archie Campbell
Arrowheads/Aerospace Cultural Center	Manchester	Coffee	Middle	Local history	Includes scale model replicas of famous pioneer and colonial era buildings
Art Museum of the University of Memphis	Memphis	Shelby	East	Art	Contemporary art, Egyptian antiquities and West African artifacts
Athenaeum Rectory	Columbia	Maury	Middle	Historic house	Former rectory of the Columbia Female Institute
Austin Peay State University Art Galleries	Clarksville	Montgomery	Middle	Art	Website, three fine art galleries
Bartlett Museum	Bartlett	Shelby	West	Local history	Operated by the Bartlett Historical Society in the Nicholas Gotten House
Battles for Chattanooga Electric Map and Museum	Lookout Mountain	Hamilton	East	Military	Website, three-dimensional electronic battle map presentation of Chattanooga's Civil War history
Bays Mountain Park	Kingsport	Sullivan	East	Multiple	Nature preserve that includes the Farmstead Museum with antiques and agricultural equipment, a nature center with exhibits on natural history and space exploration, native animals and a planetarium
Beck Cultural Exchange Center	Knoxville	Knox	East	Ethnic - African American	Website
Beechcraft Heritage Museum	Tullahoma	Coffee	Middle	Aviation	Website, Beechcraft airplanes and history
Beech River Cultural Center and Museum	Lexington	Henderson	West	Local history	
Beersheba Springs Historical Society Museum	Beersheba Springs	Grundy	Middle	Local history	website
Belle Meade Plantation	Belle Meade	Davidson	Middle	Historic house	Plantation mansion and outbuildings
Belmont Mansion	Nashville	Davidson	Middle	Historic house	Part of Belmont University, Victorian period mansion
Belmont University Galleries	Nashville	Davidson	Middle	Art	Website, Leu Art Gallery in the Lila D. Bunch Library and Gallery 121 in the Leu Center for the Visual Arts
Belz Museum of Asian and Judaic Art	Memphis	Shelby	West	Art	Formerly the Peabody Place Museum.
Bemis Mill Village Museum	Jackson	Madison	West	Local history	website, located in a 1900 cotton mill building in Bemis, area and cotton industry history
Bessie Smith Cultural Center	Chattanooga	Hamilton	East	African American	website, role of African Americans in American history and culture, formerly the Chattanooga African-American Museum
Blockade Runner, Sutlery & Civil War Museum	Wartrace	Bedford	Middle	Military	Website, Civil War artifacts, uniforms and weapons, located in a store
Blount County Historical Museum	Maryville	Blount	East	Local history	website
Blount Mansion	Knoxville	Knox	East	Historic house	Late-18th-century mansion
Bon Air Mountain Historical Society Museum	Sparta	White	Middle	Local history	website, focuses primarily on the mining and railroad history of the Plateau region, part of the White County Heritage Museum network
Bradley Academy Museum and Cultural Center	Murfreesboro	Rutherford	Middle	Local history	Operated by the town, area African American history
Buford Pusser Home and Museum	Adamsville	McNairy	West	Biographical	Website, home and museum about Sheriff Buford Pusser
Burkle Estate	Memphis	Shelby	West	Historic house	Also known as the Slave Haven Underground Railroad Museum
Butler Museum	Butler	Johnson	East	History	Website, Article from Tennessee History for Kids, story of town moved to higher ground to make way for Watauga Lake
Cades Cove Museum	Maryville	Blount	East	Local history	website, operated by the Cades Cove Preservation Association in the historic Thompson-Brown House, history and culture of Cades Cove
Cannonsburgh Village	Murfreesboro	Rutherford	Middle	Open-air	Website, reconstructed Southern village with buildings from the 1830s to the 1930s
Carnegie Center for Arts and History	Jackson	Madison	West	Local history	Cultural center with exhibits about the Civil War and local history, formerly the Discovery Center of West Tennessee
Carnton Plantation	Franklin	Williamson	Middle	Historic house	Includes mid-19th-century plantation home, Civil War battle site
Carter House	Franklin	Williamson	Middle	Historic house	mid-19th-century house with Civil War history
Casey Jones Home & Railroad Museum	Jackson	Madison	West	Railroad	Website, includes recreated 1890s train station, restored home of engineer Casey Jones and a life-size replica of Casey's 382 locomotive
C.H. Nash Museum at Chucalissa	Memphis	Shelby	West	Ethnic - Native American	Located in T.O. Fuller State Park, part of University of Memphis, archaeological finds from the Mississippian mounds
Charles H. Coolidge Medal of Honor Heritage Center	Chattanooga	Hamilton	East	Military	located at 2 W Aquarium Way Suite 104, Chattanooga, TN 37402, history of the Medal of Honor and its recipients
Charles Hall Museum	Tellico Plains	Monroe	East	Local history	Website, regional and Appalachia history, includes historical memorabilia, artifacts, equipment, guns, antique telephones, coins and currency, photos
Chasing Rainbows	Pigeon Forge	Sevier	East	Biographical	Museum for Dolly Parton located at Dollywood
Cheekwood Botanical Garden and Museum of Art	Nashville	Davidson	Middle	Art	Holdings include American art, American and British decorative arts, and contemporary art, including outdoor sculpture.
Cherokee & David Crockett Museum & Cultural Center	Lawrenceburg	Lawrence	Middle	Ethnic - Native American	May be closed
Chester Inn State Historic Site	Jonesborough	Washington	East	History	Operated by the Heritage Alliance of Northeast Tennessee and Southwest Virginia, exhibits of local history and restore late 10th-century upstairs parlor and dining room
Chickamauga and Chattanooga National Military Park	Chattanooga	Hamilton	East	Military	The Lookout Mountain Battlefield Visitor Center features exhibits about the Civil War battle site.
Children's Museum of Memphis	Memphis	Shelby	West	Children's	
Children's Museum of Oak Ridge	Oak Ridge	Anderson	East	Children's	
Clay County Museum	Celina	Clay	Middle	Local history	
Clement Railroad Hotel Museum	Dickson	Dickson	Middle	Local history	Formerly the Hotel Halbrook Railroad & Local History Museum, exhibits on Civil War, railroading, and local and regional history
Coal Miner Railroad Section House Museum	Sparta	White	Middle	Mining	Area coal mining
Cold Springs School	Portland	Sumner	Middle	Education	Website, one room schoolhouse, operated by the Highland Rim Historical Society
Cookeville Depot Museum	Cookeville	Putnam	Middle	Railroad	Collection of train cars and railroad memorabilia
Cookeville History Museum	Cookeville	Putnam	Middle	Local history	website
Coon Creek Science Center	Adamsville	McNairy	West	Natural history	Part of the Pink Palace Family of Museums, visits limited to organized groups, preserved Upper Cretaceous marine shells and vertebrate remains of the Coon Creek Formation
Cooter's Museum	Pigeon Forge	Sevier	East	Media	Website, store and museum with memorabilia from the Dukes of Hazzard television show
Cooter's Place	Nashville	Davidson	Middle	Media	Website, store and museum with memorabilia from the Dukes of Hazzard television show
Cordell Hull Birthplace State Park	Byrdstown	Pickett	Middle	Biographical	Log cabin birthplace and museum about Cordell Hull, politician and Secretary of State under
Cordova Museum	Cordova	Shelby	West	Local history	website
The Cotton Museum	Memphis	Shelby	West	Industry - Cotton	Heritage of the cotton industry
Cotton Museum at Green Frog Farm	Bells	Crockett	West	Industry	Website, story of cotton, its development and effect on local culture, village re-built of historic houses from the area
Country Music Hall of Fame and Museum	Nashville	Davidson	Middle	Hall of fame - Music	History and traditions of country music.
Cowan Railroad Museum	Cowan	Franklin	Middle	Railroad	Website, Article from Tennessee History for Kids
Cragfont	Castalian Springs	Sumner	Middle	Historic house	Early-19th-century-period house
Creative Discovery Museum	Chattanooga	Hamilton	East	Children's	
Crescent Bend	Knoxville	Knox	East	Historic house	Also known as the Armstrong-Lockett House, 1834 home with 18th-century furnishings and decorative arts
Crockett Tavern Museum	Morristown	Hamblen	East	Biographical	Site of the boyhood home of Davy Crockett, reconstruction of the 1790s John Crockett Tavern
Cumberland Homesteads Tower Museum	Crossville	Cumberland	East	History	Tower with museum about the 1930s Homesteads project and period house
Customs House Museum and Cultural Center	Clarksville	Montgomery	Middle	Multiple	Exhibits include art, science, history, Boehm porcelain, model trains; also known as the Clarksville-Montgomery County Museum
David Crockett State Park	Lawrenceburg	Lawrence	Middle	Biographical	Life and times of Davy Crockett as a pioneer, soldier, politician and industrialist
Davies Manor	Memphis	Shelby	West	Historic house	Early-19th-century two-story, log & chink home.
Davy Crockett Birthplace State Park	Limestone	Greene	East	Biographical	Includes a replica of Davy Crockett's birth cabin and a museum about his life.
Dickson-Williams Mansion	Greeneville	Greene	East	Historic house	website, 19th-century mansion, tours operated by Main Street Greeneville
Discovery Center at Murfree Spring	Murfreesboro	Rutherford	Middle	Nature center	
Discovery Park of America	Union City	Obion	West	Multiple	Local history, science, technology and art
Dixie Gun Works Old Car Museum	Union City	Obion	West	Multiple	Website, weapons and gun-making equipment, antique automobiles, antique mechanical devices and appendages
Dixon Gallery and Gardens	Memphis	Shelby	West	Art	Collections include French and American impressionism and 18th-century German porcelain.
Doak House Museum	Greeneville	Greene	East	Historic house	Website, part of Tusculum College, 1830s period house
Doctor's House	Cross Plains	Robertson	Middle	Local history	Website, also Cross Plains Heritage Museum
Downtown Gallery	Knoxville	Knox	East	Art	Website, part of the University of Tennessee
Dragon Dreams Museum and Gift Shop	Chattanooga	Hamilton	East	Commodity - Dragon-themed items	Website
Ducktown Basin Museum	Ducktown	Polk	East	Mining	Copper mining at the Burra Burra Mine}
Dunbar Carver Alumni Museum and Cultural Center	Brownsville	Haywood	West	African American	Achievements of African-American students in Haywood County
Dunlap Coke Ovens Park	Dunlap	Sequatchie	Middle	Industry	Park contains the remains of 268 beehive coke ovens used in the early 20th century to convert mountain coal into industrial coke, a product used to smelt iron ore
Dyer County Museum	Dyersburg	Dyer	West	Local history	Website, operated by the Dyer County Historical Society
Eads Museum	Carthage	Smith	Middle	History	Antiques and more, both local and international
Edge Motor Museum	Memphis	Shelby	West	Car Museum	Website, Car museum featuring the rise and fall of the American sports car in an exhibit titled "American Speed".
Elm Springs	Columbia	Maury	Middle	Historic building	Headquarters of the Sons of Confederate Veterans
Elvis & Hollywood Legends Museum	Pigeon Forge	Sevier	East	Biographical	Website, singer Elvis Presley, personal items and movie props from Hollywood actors
Emporium Center Galleries	Knoxville	Knox	East	Art	Website, operated by the Arts & Cultural Alliance
Englewood Textile Museum	Englewood	McMinn	East	Industry - Textile	Textile mills and workers
Ethridge Museum	Ethridge	Lawrence	Middle	Local history	
Ewing Gallery of Art and Architecture	Knoxville	Knox	East	Art	Website, part of University of Tennessee
Exchange Place (Kingsport, Tennessee)	Kingsport	Sullivan	East	Living	website, 1850s living history Gaines-Preston Farm
Falcon Rest Mansion	McMinnville	Warren	Middle	Historic house	Website, 1896 Victorian mansion
Falls Mill	Belvidere	Franklin	Middle	Textile	Also known as the Museum of Power & Industry at Falls Mill, historic former textile mill
Farragut Museum	Farragut	Knox	East	Local history	Website
Fayetteville-Lincoln County Museum	Fayetteville	Lincoln	Middle	Local history	Located in the former Borden Milk Plant
Fire Museum of Memphis	Memphis	Shelby	West	Fire fighting	
Fisk University Galleries	Nashville	Davidson	Middle	Art	website, Carl Van Vechten Gallery and Aaron Douglas Gallery
Floyd Garrett's Muscle Car Museum	Sevierville	Sevier	East	Automobile	Website
Fort Donelson National Battlefield	Dover	Stewart	Middle	Military	Visitor center museum with Civil War artifacts and exhibits, remains of two Civil War forts and battlefield
Fort Negley	Nashville	Davidson	Middle	Military	Includes visitor center with exhibits about the 1862 surrender of Nashville and the building of Fort Negley
Fort Loudoun	Vonore	Monroe	East	Military	Reconstructed British Colonial fort and interpretive center.
Fort Pillow State Park and Museum	Henning	Lauderdale	West	Fort - Civil War	History and site of the American Civil War Battle of Fort Pillow.
Fort Southwest Point	Kingston	Roane	East	Military	Restored federal frontier outpost and visitor center with archaeological and history exhibits.
Frist Center for the Visual Arts	Nashville	Davidson	Middle	Art	Changing art exhibits.
Galen School Museum	Lafayette	Macon	Middle	Local history	
General Shale Museum of Ancient Brick	Johnson City	Washington	East	Commodity	Website, bricks from biblical and pre-biblical times, brick construction, operated by the General Shale company
Giles County Historical Museum	Pulaski	Giles	Middle	Local history	
Girl Scout Museum at Daisy's Place	Knoxville	Knox	East	Scouting	website
Glenn Cardwell Heritage Museum	Pittman Center	Sevier	East	Local history	Located in Pittman Center Elementary School
Graceland	Memphis	Shelby	West	Historic house	Home of Elvis Presley.
Granville Museum	Granville	Jackson	Middle	Local history	
Gray Fossil Museum	Gray	Washington	East	Natural history	Fossils from the Gray Fossil Site, officially known as the East Tennessee State University and General Shale Brick Natural History Museum and Visitor Center
Great Smoky Mountains Heritage Center	Townsend	Blount	East	Open-air	Cultural heritage of East Tennessee and the Great Smoky Mountains region including Native American history, pioneer and mountaineer history and culture
Green McAdoo Cultural Center	Clinton	Anderson	East	Ethnic - African American	
Greenback Heritage Museum	Greenback	Loudon	East	Local history	website
Greeneville Greene County History Museum	Greeneville	Greene	East	Local history	website, formerly the Nathanael Greene Museum
Grundy County Heritage Center Museum	Tracy City	Grundy	Middle	Local history	website, operated by the Grundy County Historical Society
Grundy County Miners Museum	Palmer	Grundy	Middle	Mining	Area coal mining
Guinness World Records	Gatlinburg	Sevier	East	Amusement	
Hands On! Regional Museum	Johnson City	Washington	East	Children's	Website
Hands-On Science Center	Tullahoma	Coffee	Middle	Science	Website
Haywood County Museum	Brownsville	Haywood	West	Local history	Located in the former Haywood High School
Heritage Center of Murfreesboro and Rutherford County	Murfreesboro	Rutherford	Middle	Local history	Website
The Hermitage	Hermitage	Davidson	Middle	Historic house	Home of U.S. President Andrew Jackson and museum, near Nashville
Historic Collinsville	Southside	Montgomery	Middle	Living history	mid-19th-century Southern village life
Historic Mansker's Station	Goodlettsville	Sumner	Middle	Living	website, includes 18th-century Mansker's Fort and 1790s-period Bowen-Campbell House
Historic Rugby	Rugby	Morgan	East	Open-air	Experimental utopian community with several historic houses and other buildings to tour
Hollywood Star Cars Museum	Gatlinburg	Sevier	East	Automobile	Website
Hollywood Wax Museum Pigeon Forge	Pigeon Forge	Sevier	East	Media	Wax figures of celebrities including movie stars, television personalities, and music icons.
Houston Museum of Decorative Arts	Chattanooga	Hamilton	East	Art	website, includes antique glass, ceramics, furniture, music boxes, coverlets and other rare pieces
Hunter Museum of American Art	Chattanooga	Hamilton	East	Art	American art including Hudson River School, 19th-century-genre painting, American Impressionism, the Ashcan School, early modernism, regionalism, and post World War II modern and contemporary art
International Rock-a-billy Hall of Fame	Jackson	Madison	West	Music - Rock-a-billy	Website, memorabilia and videos of rockabilly artists
International Towing and Recovery Hall of Fame and Museum	Chattanooga	Hamilton	East	Transportation	Tow trucks and equipment, industry-related displays of collectible toys, tools, pictorial histories of manufacturers
J. Houston Gordon Museum	Martin	Weakley	West	Multiple	website, part of the University of Tennessee at Martin Paul Meek Library, gallery for changing exhibits in art, decorative arts, photography, culture, science and history
Jackson County Museum	Gainesboro	Jackson	Middle	Local history	Operated by the Jackson County Historical Society in the Fred Lucas Haile Museum building
President James K. Polk Home	Columbia	Maury	Middle	Historic house	19th-century home and museum of President James K. Polk
James D. Vaughan Museum	Lawrenceburg	Lawrence	Middle	Music	website, honors the "Father of Southern Gospel Music", James David Vaughan
James White's Fort	Knoxville	Knox	East	Historic house	Early-19th-century log fort cabins
Jasper Regional History Museum	Jasper	Marion	Middle	Local history	website
Johnsonville State Historic Park	New Johnsonville	Humphreys	Middle	Military	History of the Battle of Johnsonville
Jonesborough-Washington County History Museum	Jonesborough	Washington	East	Local history	website, operated by the Heritage Alliance of Northeast Tennessee and Southwest Virginia.
Kiwanis Cookeville Children's Museum	Cookeville	Putnam	Middle	Children's	
Knoxville Museum of Art	Knoxville	Knox	East	Art	Contemporary art
L & N Train Station	Clarksville	Montgomery	Middle	Railroad	
Lairdland Farm House	Cornersville	Giles	Middle	Historic house	Mid-19th-century house, tours by appointment
Lane Motor Museum	Nashville	Davidson	Middle	Transportation - Automobile	Mostly European automobiles, including propeller-powered vehicles, microcars, three wheeled cars, amphibious vehicles, alternative fuel vehicles, military vehicles, one of a kind vehicles and prototypes
Lenoir Museum Cultural Complex	Norris	Anderson	East	Multiple	Located in Norris Dam State Park, includes Lenoir Pioneer Museum with antique household items and tools, the Rice Gristmill and the Crosby Threshing Barn
Lenoir City Museum	Lenoir City	Loudon	East	Local history	Website
Lichterman Nature Center	Memphis	Shelby	West	Nature center	Part of the Pink Palace Family of Museums, arboretum, nature center and museum of native wildlife
Little Congress Bicycle Museums	Cumberland Gap	Claiborne	Middle	Transportation	Website
Little River Railroad and Lumber Company Museum	Townsend	Blount	East	Railroad	Website
Loretta Lynn Ranch	Hurricane Mills	Humphreys	West	Multiple	Website, country music star Loretta Lynn's park, includes the biographical Coal Miner's Daughter Museum, the Plantation Home tour, Frontier Homestead with 19th-century furnished cabins and equipment, Native American Artifacts Museum, Loretta's Fan & Doll Museum
Louisville & Nashville Railroad Station/Museum	Etowah	McMinn	East	Railroad	website, departure point for the Tennessee Valley Railroad Museum
Lynn H. Wood Archaeological Museum	Collegedale	Hamilton	East	Archaeology	Part of Southern Adventist University, ancient Near East objects
Lynnville Railroad Museum	Lynville	Giles	Middle	Railroad	
Mabry-Hazen House	Knoxville	Knox	East	Historic house	mid-19th-century house with historic connections
Madame Tussauds Nashville	Nashville			Wax	
Magevney House	Memphis	Shelby	West	Historic house	1850-period Irish immigrant family cottage, part of the Pink Palace Family of Museums
Mallory–Neely House	Memphis	Shelby	West	Historic house	19th-century Victorian mansion, part of the Pink Palace Family of Museums
Marble Springs	Knoxville	Knox	East	Historic site	Also known as Gov. John Sevier Home, late-18th-century home of John Sevier, first governor of Tennessee
Marion County Coal Miners Museum	Whitwell	Marion	Middle	Mining	website
Matt Gardner Homestead Museum	Elkton	Giles	Middle	Historic house	Website, early-20th-century farmstead of Matt Gardner, an African American farmer
McClung Museum of Natural History and Culture	Knoxville	Knox	East	Multiple	Part of the University of Tennessee, exhibits include natural history, archaeology, Ancient Egypt, decorative arts, geology and fossils of Tennessee, Tennessee freshwater mussels
McLemore House Museum	Franklin	Williamson	Middle	Historic house	Exhibits about area African American heritage
McMinn County Living Heritage Museum	Athens	McMinn	East	History	Website, historic artifacts, antique household items and decorative arts
McNairy County Historical Museum	Selmer	McNairy	West	Local history	
Meigs County Historical Museum	Decatur	Meigs	East	Local history	Area history, culture
Memphis Brooks Museum of Art	Memphis	Shelby	West	Art	Collections include Italian Renaissance, Baroque, Impressionist, and 20th-century artists, English portraiture, contemporary paintings, 19th- and 20th-century sculpture and decorative arts
Memphis Music Hall of Fame	Memphis	Shelby	West	Music	Memphis musicians
Memphis Railroad & Trolley Museum	Memphis	Shelby	West	Railroad and Trolley History	Historical displays, interactive displays for kids, model train layouts
Memphis Rock N' Soul Museum	Memphis	Shelby	West	Music - Rock 'n' Roll	Memphis music experience
Metal Museum	Memphis	Shelby	West	Decorative art	Historical and contemporary metalwork, includes a working smithy and foundry for classes
Military Memorial Museum of the Upper Cumberland	Crossville	Cumberland	East	Military	Located in the restored 2nd Cumberland County Courthouse
Mississippi River Park and Museum	Memphis	Shelby	West	Maritime	Natural and cultural history of the Lower Mississippi River Valley, including river transportation.
Mitchell Museum	Tullahoma	Coffee	Middle	Local history	website, located in the South Jackson Civic Center
Monterey Depot Museum	Monterey	Putnam	Middle	Railroad	website, local and railroad history
Moore County Old Jail Museum	Lynchburg	Moore	Middle	Prison	Website, operated by the Moore County Historical Society
Mount Pleasant / Maury County Museum of Local History	Mount Pleasant	Maury	Middle	Local history	Website, includes artifacts relating to the phosphate industry
Muse Knoxville	Knoxville	Knox	East	Children's	Popular non-profit children's museum focusing on STEAM (science, technology, engineering, and arts) with hands-on exhibits and full-dome planetarium. Formerly the East Tennessee Discovery Center
Museum at Mountain Home	Johnson City	Washington	East	Medical	Website, part of the Quillen College of Medicine of East Tennessee State University, history of the Veterans Administration Medical Center at Mountain Home and health care in South Central Appalachia
Museum Center at Five Points	Cleveland	Bradley	East	Local history	History and culture of the Ocoee Region
Museum of Appalachia	Norris	Anderson	East	Living	Early-20th-century mountain life in the Southern Appalachians.
Museum of Biblical History	Collierville	Shelby	West	Archaeological	website, archaeological artifacts and exact full-sized replicas of major archaeological discoveries from Bible lands
Museum of East Tennessee History	Knoxville	Knox	East	Local history	Operated by the East Tennessee Historical Society
Museum of Salt and Pepper Shakers	Gatlinburg	Sevier	East	Commodity - Salt and pepper shakers	Website, Roadside America report, Also known as The Salt and Pepper Shaker Museum
Museum of Scott County	Huntsville	Scott	East	History	Website, operated by Scott County High School students
Nashville, Chattanooga & St. Louis Depot and Railroad Museum	Jackson	Madison	West	Railroad	Website, also known as the Depot Museum
Nashville Zoo at Grassmere	Nashville	Davidson	Middle	Multiple	Includes zoo, 19th-century Grassmere Historic Home and the Grassmere Historic Farm
National Museum of African American Music	Nashville	Davidson	Middle	Music History	Includes biographies, photography, instruments, musical examples https://www.nmaam.org/
National Bird Dog Museum	Grand Junction	Hardeman	West	Sports	Website, home to Bird Dog Foundation, includes National Retriever Museum, Field Trial Hall of Fame
National Civil Rights Museum	Memphis	Shelby	West	History	Site of the assassination of Martin Luther King Jr., museum of the events and legacy of the civil right movement
Newbern Depot & Railroad Museum	Newbern	Dyer	West	Railroad	
Netherland Inn	Kingsport	Sullivan	East	Historic house	Early-19th-century-period house and inn, also Log Cabin Children's Museum and Schoolhouse
Oaklands Historic House Museum	Murfreesboro	Rutherford	Middle	Historic house	19th-century mansion with Civil War history
Oaklawn Garden	Germantown	Shelby	West	Local history	Indoor/outdoor museum, park and botanical garden, collects local history and folk life related item, also railroad related exhibits
Old Jail Museum	Lawrenceburg	Lawrence	Middle	Prison	
Old Jail Museum	Winchester	Franklin	Middle	Prison	
Old Stone Fort State Archaeological Park	Manchester	Coffee	Middle	Archaeology	Prehistoric Native American structure and museum.
Overton County Heritage Museum	Livingston	Overton	Middle	Local history	
Paris-Henry County Heritage Center	Paris	Henry	West	Local history	Website
Parsons Area Historical Museum	Parsons	Decatur	West	Local history	Website
Parthenon	Nashville	Davidson	Middle	Art	1897 full-scale replica of the original Parthenon in Athens, now an art museum with American art and changing exhibits.
Patton House Museum	Cookeville	Putnam	Middle	Doll	Also known as the Cookeville Doll Museum, features 2,000 dolls and doll furniture
Pink Palace Museum and Planetarium	Memphis	Shelby	West	Multiple	Cultural and natural history of Memphis and the Mid-South; part of the Pink Palace Family of Museums
Pinson Mounds State Archaeological Park	Pinson	Madison	West	Archaeological	Artifacts from the park's 15 Native American mounds
Pioneer Hall Museum	Pleasant Hill	Cumberland	East	Local history	
President Andrew Johnson Museum and Library	Greeneville	Greene	East	Biographical	Part of Tusculum College, exhibits and personal artifacts of the Johnson family and Johnson's personal library
Ralph J. Passarella Museum	Loretto	Lawrence	Middle	History	Includes newspapers, magazines, books, toys, tools, quilts, medical equipment, telephone receivers, telephone operator's switchboards, soda fountain, wood burning kitchen stove, vintage clothing
Ramsey House	Knoxville	Knox	East	Historic house	Early-19th-century-period house
Rattle and Snap	Columbia	Maury	Middle	Historic house	mid-19th-century plantation home
Red Clay State Park	Cleveland	Bradley	East	Native American	Museum about the 19th-century Cherokee, park at site of last seat of Cherokee government before the 1838 enforcement of the Indian Removal Act of 1830
Reece Museum	Johnson City	Washington	East	Multiple	Website, part of East Tennessee State University, history & art, also known as B. Carroll Reece Memorial Museum
Rhea County Courthouse and Museum	Dayton	Rhea	East	History	Site of the Scopes Trial and museum
Ripley's Believe It or Not Museum	Gatlinburg	Sevier	East	Oddities	
Rippavilla Plantation	Spring Hill	Maury	Middle	Historic house	mid-19th-century plantation mansion
Robertson County History Museum	Springfield	Robertson	Middle	Local history	website, operated by the Robertson County Historical Society
Rock Castle	Hendersonville	Sumner	Middle	Historic house	Late 18th period house and outbuildings
Rocky Mount State Historic Site	Piney Flats	Sullivan	East	Living	Home of William Blount, territorial governor, recreates the year 1791
Rose Center	Morristown	Hamblen	East	Art; local history	Located in the former Rose School, built in 1892
Rose Mont	Gallatin	Sumner	Middle	Historic house	19th-century Greek Revival house
Roy Acuff Union Museum and Library	Maynardville	Union	East	Local history	website, operated by the Union County Historical Society
Rusty's TV & Movie Car Museum	Jackson	Madison	West	Media	website, over 25 cars that have been used in movies and TV and TV and movie memorabilia
Sam Davis Home	Smyrna	Rutherford	Middle	Historic house	Website, mid-19th-century home of Confederate courier Sam Davis
Sam Davis Museum	Pulaski	Giles	Middle	Military	Site where Confederate hero Sam Davis was executed, includes Civil war artifacts
Sam Houston Schoolhouse	Maryville	Blount	East	School	One room log schoolhouse where Sam Houston once taught
Scarritt-Bennett Center Laskey Gallery	Nashville	Davidson	Middle	Art	Website, public exhibitions about racial equality, women's empowerment, intercultural understanding, and spiritual formation
Sequoyah Birthplace Museum	Vonore	Monroe	East	Ethnic - Native American	website, history and culture of the Cherokee Indians, life of Cherokee hero Sequoyah
Sevier County Heritage Museum	Sevierville	Sevier	East	Local history	
Sgt. Alvin C. York State Historic Park	Pall Mall	Fentress	Middle	Biographical	Includes family farm and museum of World War I hero Sgt. Alvin C. York
Shiloh National Military Park	Savannah	Hardin	Middle	Military	Includes two visitor centers with Civil War exhibits
Smith County Heritage Museum	Carthage	Smith	Middle	Local history	website
South Pittsburg Heritage Museum	South Pittsburg	Marion	Middle	Local history	website, operated by the South Pittsburg Historic Preservation Society
Southern Appalachia Railway Museum	Knoxville	Knox	East	Railroad	Working antique locomotives and rolling stock
Southern Gospel Museum and Hall of Fame	Pigeon Forge	Sevier	East	Hall of fame - Music	Located in Dollywood
Southern Museum and Galleries of Photography, Culture and History	McMinnville	Warren	East	Local history	
Sparta Rock House	Sparta	White	Middle	Historic house	19th-century toll house
Stax Museum of American Soul Music	Memphis	Shelby	West	Music - Industry	Museum about Stax Records, a major factor in the creation of the Southern soul and Memphis soul music styles and more.
Stones River National Battlefield	Murfreesboro	Rutherford	Middle	Military	Visitor center museum and tours of historic Civil War battlefield
Sumner County Museum	Gallatin	Sumner	Middle	Local history	Website
Sun Studio	Memphis	Shelby	West	Music - Industry	Historic recording studio where many famous artists made records
Sutton Homestead & Pioneer Village	Granville	Jackson	Middle	Open air	website, includes guided tours of historic original home and furniture, a grist mill shop, blacksmith shop, weaving shop, Agriculture Museum, 1820 Log Cabin and homestead, 1950's Gulf Service Station, Antique Car & Transportation Museum
Sweetwater Heritage Museum	Sweetwater	Monroe	East	Local history	Information
Swift Aircraft Museum	Athens	McMinn	East	Aviation	Website, Globe Swift aircraft, located at the McMinn County Airport
Sycamore Shoals State Historic Park	Elizabethton	Carter	East	Multiple	Includes the reconstructed American Revolutionary War Fort Watauga, a visitor center with exhibits and the late-18th-century John and Landon Carter Mansion
T.S. Stribling Museum	Clifton	Wayne			Library and home of Pulitzer-prize-winning author T.S. Stribling, listed on the National Register of Historic Places
Tennessee Agricultural Museum	Nashville	Davidson	Middle	Open-air	Collection of home and farm artifacts from the 19th century and early 20th century along with rural Tennessee prints and folk art sculptures
Tennessee Central Railway Museum	Nashville	Davidson	Middle	Railroad	Historic trains, railroad artifacts and memorabilia
Tennessee Governor's Mansion	Nashville	Davidson	Middle	Historic house	Tours by advanced reservation
Tennessee Museum of Aviation	Sevierville	Sevier	East	Aviation	Website, located at the Gatlinburg–Pigeon Forge Airport, features restored WWII aircraft
Tennessee Museum of Early Farm Life	Spring Hill	Maury	Middle	Agriculture	Located behind Rippavilla Plantation, features horse and mule drawn equipment dating back to the early 1800s
Tennessee Newspaper and Printing Museum	Rogersville	Hawkins	East	Media	website, operated by the Rogersville Heritage Association, replica 18th, 19th and early 20th-century print shops
Tennessee Sports Hall of Fame	Nashville	Davidson	Middle	Sports	Located in the Bridgestone Arena
Tennessee River Folklife Museum	Eva	Benton	West	Culture	Located in Nathan Bedford Forrest State Park
Tennessee River Freshwater Pearl Farm	Camden	Benton	West	Industry	Website, includes museum about freshwater pearls and the musseling industry, TN History for Kids article
Tennessee River Museum	Savannah	Hardin	West	Local history	Website
Tennessee State Museum	Nashville	Davidson	Middle	History	History of the state of Tennessee, includes Military Branch Museum, tours of the Tennessee State Capitol
Tennessee Valley Railroad Museum	Chattanooga	Hamilton	East	Railroad	Heritage railroad and equipment
Tennessee Walking Horse National Museum	Wartrace	Bedford	Middle	Equestrian	All aspects of the Tennessee Walking Horse industry
Tipton County Museum	Covington	Tipton	West	Local history	Website
Tipton-Haynes State Historic Site	Johnson City	Washington	East	Historic house	19th-century farm estate and outbuildings
Titanic	Pigeon Forge	Sevier	East	Maritime	Artifacts from the RMS Titanic
Todd Gallery	Murfreesboro	Rutherford	Middle	Art	website, part of Middle Tennessee State University
Travellers Rest Plantation & Museum	Nashville	Davidson	Middle	Historic house	Life and work of John Overton, Overton Plantation, Nashville in the Civil War
Treasuring the Word Rare Bible & Book Museum	Sevierville	Sevier	East	Religious	Website, history of the Bible's progression into the English language
Trenton Teapot Museum	Trenton	Gibson	West	Commodity - Teapot	website
Trousdale Place	Gallatin	Sumner	Middle	Historic house	1813 home of John H. Bowen, local attorney and member of the United States House of Representatives, and of governor of Tennessee William Trousdale
Tulip Grove	Nashville	Davidson	Middle	Historic house	Antebellum Greek Revival house
Tullahoma Fine Arts Center	Tullahoma	Coffee	Middle	Art	Website, includes fine art gallery with changing exhibits
Twin Cities Railroad Museum	South Fulton	Obion	West	Railroad	website
Unicoi County Historical Society Museum	Erwin	Unicoi	East	Local history	
University of the South Art Gallery	Sewanee	Franklin	Middle	Art	website
Vanderbilt University Galleries	Nashville	Davidson	Middle	Art	website
Veterans' Museum	Halls	Lauderdale	West	Aviation	Located at the former Dyersburg Army Air Base, a training facility during World War II for B-17 pilots, now Arnold Field (Tennessee)
Vonore Heritage Museum	Vonore	Monroe	East	Local history	website
W. C. Handy Museum	Memphis	Shelby	West	Historic house, music history	website, operated by Heritage Tours, Memphis, home of W. C. Handy, known as the "Father of the Blues"
Warren County Heritage Center and Museum	McMinnville	Warren	East	Local history	Website
West Tennessee Agricultural Museum	Milan	Gibson	West	Agriculture	website, operated by the agricultural experiment station of the University of Tennessee, includes tools, equipment and displays of agriculture and agrarian life in West Tennessee
West Tennessee Delta Heritage Center	Brownsville	Haywood	West	Multiple	website, includes West Tennessee Cotton Museum, West Tennessee Music Museum, Hatchie River Museum, Sleepy John Estes Home, Felsenthal Lincoln Collection, Flagg Grove School with Tina Turner memorabilia
West Tennessee Cultural Heritage Museum	Jackson	Madison	West	Local history	Website
West Tennessee Regional Art Center	Humboldt	Gibson	West	Art	Website
White County Heritage Museum	Sparta	White	Middle	Local history	
White County Military Museum	Sparta	White	Middle	Military	
Willie Nelson and Friends Museum	Nashville	Davidson	Middle	Music	Website, country musician Willie Nelson and country music history
Wilson County Museum	Lebanon	Wilson	Middle	Local history	Open Sunday afternoons
Woodruff-Fontaine House	Memphis	Shelby	West	Historic house	1870 Victorian mansion
Women's Basketball Hall of Fame	Knoxville	Knox	East	Hall of fame - Sports	Honors men and women who have contributed to the sport of women's basketball
Wyatt Archaeological Museum	Cornersville	Marshall	Middle	Archaeology	Website, Noah's Ark theories and archaeological work done by Ron Wyatt
Wynnewood State Historic Area	Castalian Springs	Sumner	Middle	Historic house	Early-19th-century log inn house

== Defunct museums ==
- Beale Street Police Museum, Memphis, closed in 2005. Media related to Beale Street Police Museum at Wikimedia Commons
- Breweriana Museum, Millersville
- Carbo's Smoky Mountain Police Museum, Pigeon Forge
- Chattanooga History Center, Chattanooga, closed in 2017, collections now at the Chattanooga Public Library and the University of Tennessee at Chattanooga
- Chattanooga Model Railroad Museum, Chattanooga, closed in 2015, may reopen in the Chattanooga Choo Choo Hotel in the future
- Dinosaur Walk Museum, Pigeon Forge, closed in 2011
- Grand Guitar Museum, Bristol
- Howard H. Baker Jr. Museum, Knoxville, formerly part of the Howard H. Baker Jr. Center for Public Policy, closed in 2012, exhibits on display around the facility
- Museum of Tobacco Art and History, Nashville, closed in 1998
- Music Valley Wax Museum, Nashville
- Obion County Museum, Union City, closed in 2012, collections moved to Discovery Park of Americar
- Smoky Mountain Car Museum, Pigeon Forge
- Soda Museum, Springfield, also known as the Museum of Beverage Containers and Advertising
- World of the Unexplained museum, Gatlinburg

== See also ==
- Nature Centers in Tennessee
- List of historical societies in Tennessee
