= Amum =

AMUM may refer to:

- `Amum, a village in eastern Yemen
- Art Museum of the University of Memphis
