= Oaklawn Garden =

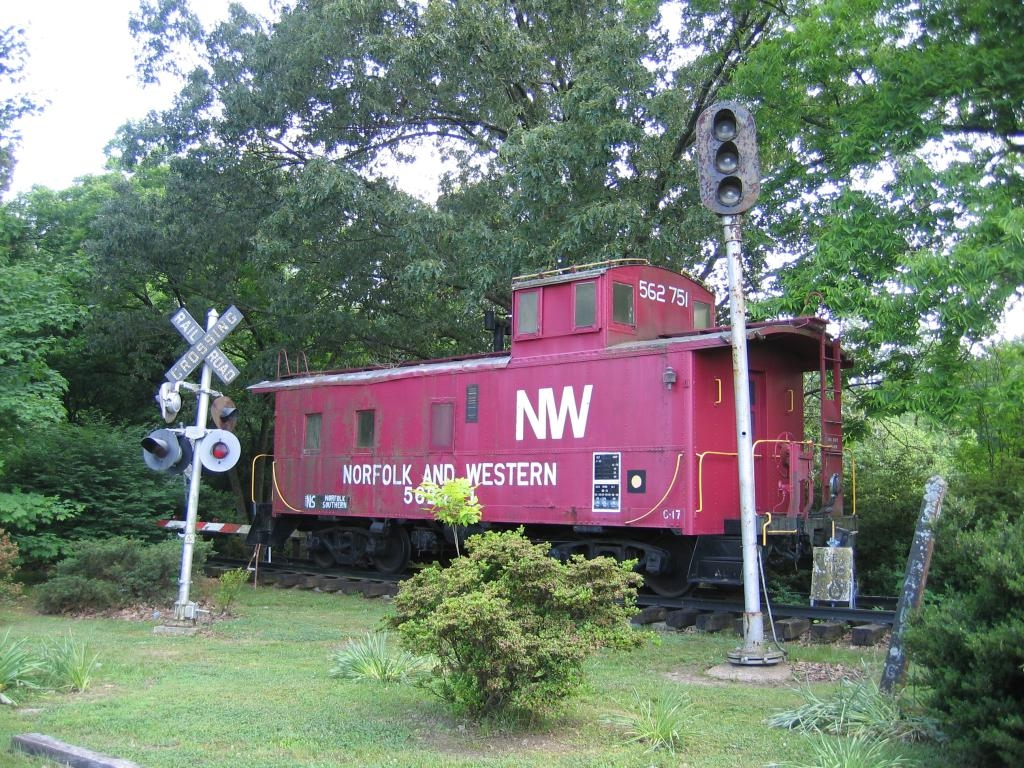
- 1944 Norfolk & Western caboose at Oaklawn Garden

- Location of Oaklawn Garden on the Tennessee map
- Established: ca. 1975, indoor museum ca. 1987
- Location: 7831 Old Poplar Pike, Germantown, Tennessee
- Coordinates: 35.08025°N 89.80201°W
- Type: Botanical garden, park, local history museum
- Directors: Harry and Becky Cloyes
- Website: n/a

Oaklawn Garden, also known as Oaklawn Gardens, is a botanical garden, park and museum located at 7831 Old Poplar Pike in Germantown, Tennessee, United States. A historic residential home, erected by the original landowner in 1854, is situated on the property.

Floral attractions on the 20 acres (8 ha) property consist of daffodils, azaleas and other native flowers. About 2 acres (1 ha) of Oaklawn Garden are dedicated to the cultivation of more than 300 varieties of daffodils, an effort that was started in 1924. Boxwood, oak, birch and other species of indigenous trees and shrubs represent the woody plants in the botanical garden and park. Oaklawn Garden is also home to smaller species of native wildlife.

Historic items relevant to local cultural history, as well as railroad and local traffic history are on display in the museum exhibit of Oaklawn Garden. The museum segment consists of an outdoor collection and an indoor exhibit. The outdoor collection was started around 1975 and is integrated into the botanical garden and park. The indoor exhibit was started circa 1987 and is housed in a former florist shop which was built at Oaklawn Garden in 1957.

In 2009, the botanical garden, park and museum are privately owned but open to the public.

The property owner, Harry Cloyes and his wife Becky, donated the property to city of Germantown to keep it as a public park, garden and history museum of Germantown.

For years when azaleas in full bloom, normally the first two weeks of April, the garden has become a local attraction to take family pictures including wedding pictures.

The Oaklawn Garden is free and open to the public, but donations are welcome. The property was listed on the National Register of Historic Places in 2018.

== History ==
The residential homestead situated on the property was built by William Carter in 1854. The original property consisted of 493 acres (200 ha) of land which was owned by Carter and was subdivided in 1872. A 20 acres (8 ha) parcel that would later become home of the botanical garden, park and museum was purchased by Fritz Hussy and Mamie Cloyes and named Oaklawn Garden in 1918. Included in the purchase of the property was the 1854 residential home. The cultivation of daffodils was started by Mamie Cloyes in 1924.

A botanical garden, park and museum of historical items was established on the property by Harry Cloyes, son of Mamie Cloyes, and his wife Becky. The outdoor collection at Oaklawn Garden was started around 1975 with items donated by the City of Germantown, railroad companies as well as local schools, businesses and individuals. The indoor segment of the museum is situated in a separate building which was erected in 1957 as a florist shop to sell flowers grown at Oaklawn Garden. The building served its original purpose until circa 1987. Since then, the building was used to house the indoor part of the collection of historical items.

== Park and museum ==
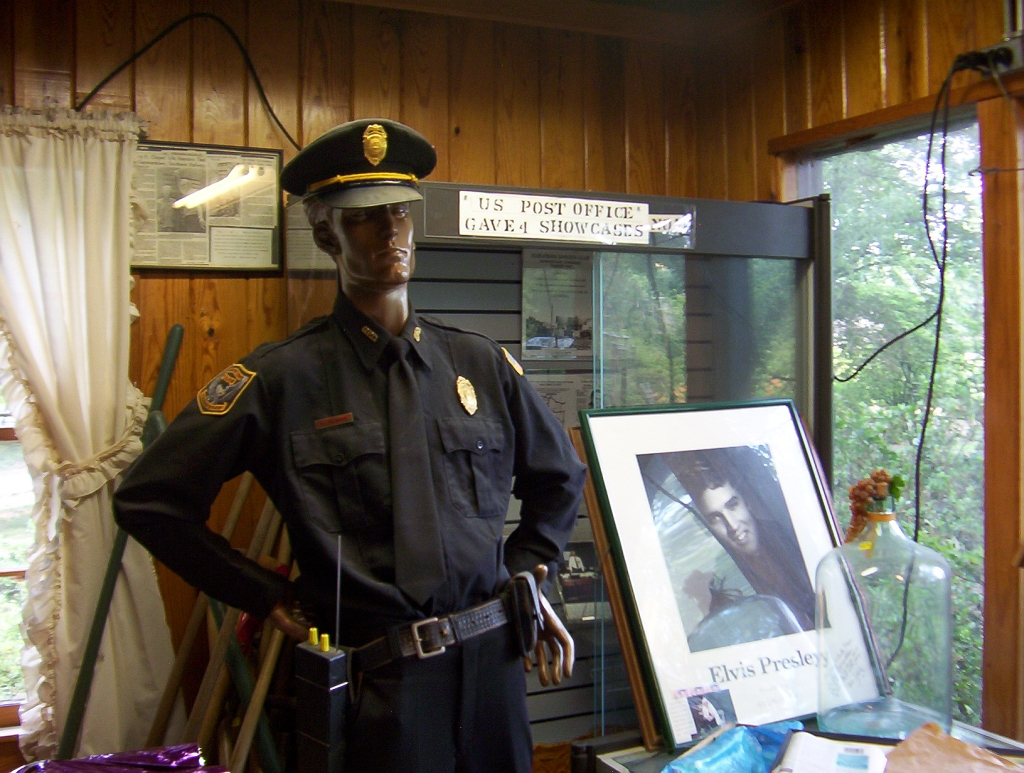
Historic police uniform

The botanical garden and park at Oaklawn Garden are home to a variety of flora and smaller wildlife in a park-like setting. Prominent in the flora of Oaklawn Garden are different varieties of native daffodils, azaleas and other native flowers. About 2 acres (1 ha) of the property are dedicated to the cultivation of daffodils of which more than 300 varieties are present at Oaklawn Garden in 2009. The woody plants at the botanical garden and park are represented by boxwood, oak and birch as well as other indigenous shrubs and trees. Many trees are equipped with markers to identify the species. The fauna of Oaklawn Garden includes different species of native birds and smaller wildlife, including squirrels.

Historical items from Germantown's past are on display in the outdoor museum collection. The items of the outdoor collection are numbered and can be identified in a self-guided tour with help of the museum brochure. Outdoor exhibits include a 1942 fire truck of the Germantown Fire Department and the first Germantown jail, consisting of just one jail cell. A Southern Railway boxcar built in 1889 or 1891, a Norfolk and Western Railway 1944 caboose, historic pumps, farm equipment, traffic lights, traffic signs and historic street lights as well as displaced gravestones are also part of the outdoor display. The outdoor collection consists of nearly eighty items. The indoor exhibition is located in a building formerly used as a florist shop and showcases historical items with relevance to local history and local folk life.

In 2009, the botanical garden, park and museum at Oaklawn Garden are located on private property but open to the public. Limited parking is available and the admission to the botanical garden, park and museum is free. A museum brochure outlining the history of the property and interpreting the numbered exhibits of the outdoor and indoor collection in a self-guided tour is available at no charge.

== See also ==
- List of botanical gardens in Tennessee
- List of museums in Tennessee
- National Register of Historic Places listings in Shelby County, Tennessee
