= Davies Manor =

Historic house in Tennessee, United States

- U.S. National Register of Historic Places
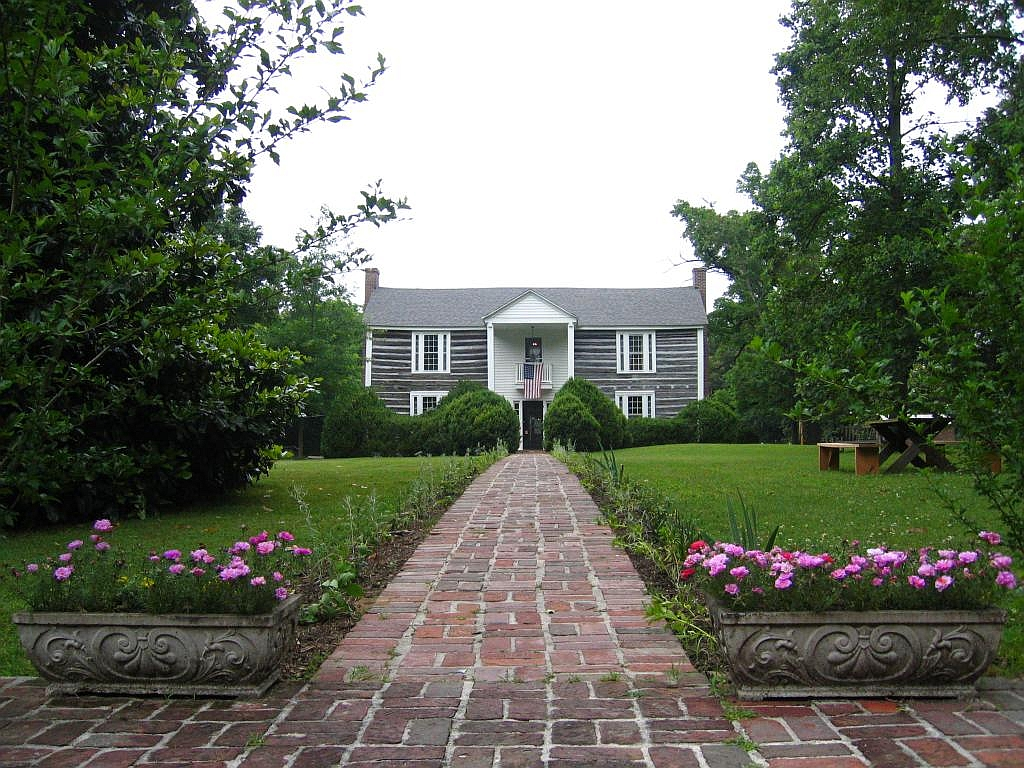

- Location within Tennessee Location within the United States
- Location: 9336 Davies Plantation Rd. Memphis, Tennessee
- Coordinates: 35.225428°N 89.749717°W
- Built: 1807
- NRHP reference No.: 75001787
- Added to NRHP: March 19, 1975

Davies Manor is one of the oldest extant homes in Shelby County, Tennessee, United States, and possibly the oldest anywhere in the region of West Tennessee. It is a two-story log and chink home made using white oak logs on what was once a plantation with a total of approximately 2,000 acres (8.1 km^{2}).

== Origins ==
Historians of Shelby County do not know who originally built the home, although some sources state that it was built by Native Americans in 1807. This legend likely came from the fact that a Native American trail did run nearby, and Dr. Julius Augustus Davies, one of the men who lived in the home, was an avid collector of Native artifacts. In 1821, North Carolina granted 600 acres of land to Thomas Henderson in return for his Revolutionary War Service. In 1830, Henderson sold 320 acres of this land to Emmanuel Young, who allowed the taxes to lapse. It is likely that either Henderson or Young built the original one-room log cabin, which is now the parlor of the manor house.

Shelby County tax collector Joel W. Royster purchased the home in January 1831, expanding the house from one room to two stories by 1837. A locater's deed shows the purchase of Shelby County land by William E. Davies in 1838, but the 1850 census lists Davies living with his family in Fayette County. It is generally accepted that William's two sons, Logan Early Davies (age 14) and James Baxter Davies (age 12), came to and from Fayette County on Stage Road (now part of Highway 64) to farm the land. In 1851, Logan and James bought the land with the house on it from Royster, creating what became known as Davies Plantation. At its heyday, the plantation was approximately 2,000 acres (8.1 km^{2}). As many as 23 enslaved African-Americans lived on the property prior to the Civil War, during the days of American slavery.

== Family history ==
William Early Davies was the father of Logan and James Davies. His wife was Sarah Hadley, an accomplished quilter whose work is on display in the museum. Davies was a Methodist minister and grist mill operator. On November 11, 1824, Logan was born in Maury County, Tennessee. James was then born on June 9, 1826.

In 1854, James Baxter Davies (age 28) married Penelope Almeda Little (age 21). One year later, in 1855, Julius Augustus Davies was born. Two years later, in 1857, William Little Davies was born. In 1859, Penelope died at the age of 26, after five years of marriage. Logan Early Davies (age 36) married Frances Ina Vaughn Davies (age 19) in 1860. Gillie Mertis Davies was born a year later, on December 25, 1861. In 1863, Linnie Lee Davies was born. Frances Davies died in 1865 at the age of 24 after five years of marriage.

James Davies served in the 38th Tennessee Infantry from March 5, 1862, to May 1865. He then married Pauline Leake, the younger sister of Almeda, his first wife. They divorced after two years. It is widely accepted that James Davies suffered from some sort of post-traumatic stress disorder, which contributed to the divorce. On June 17, 1904, James Baxter Davies died, leaving 596 acres (2.41 km^{2}), including Davies Manor, to his sons, Dr. Julius Augustus and Dr. William Little Davies (both bachelors).

Twenty years later, on December 21, 1924, Dr. Julius Augustus Davies died, leaving one-half undivided interest in Davies Manor to his brother, Dr. William Little Davies. Seven years after that, Dr. William Little Davies died, leaving 596 acres (2.41 km^{2}), including Davies Manor, to his cousin, Ellen Davies-Rodgers who donated the house to the Davies Manor Association in 1976. The house is located in Bartlett, Tennessee, a suburb of Memphis. This area was formerly part of Brunswick, Tennessee, and is sometimes identified as part of a nearby settlement called Morning Sun, where a Civil War skirmish took place.

== Property as a Historic Site ==
After Dr. William Little Davies bequeathed the home and land to his cousin, Ellen Davies-Rodgers, she began an extensive renovation and preservation project on the log home with the eventual goal of opening the home to the public for tours, with the help of the Zachariah Davies Chapter of the Daughters of the American Revolution. Ms. Davies added electricity to the home in the late 1950s and began hosting tours, meetings, parties, and events. Upon her 1994 death, the Davies Manor Association, Inc. took on the task of preserving and interpreting Davies Manor Plantation. Their mission "is to preserve and enhance Davies Manor Plantation as a portrayal of early Shelby County farm life for the education and enjoyment of visitors." The museum is currently open Tuesday through Saturday, 12:00 to 4:00. The tour consists of a short video, followed by a docent-led tour of the house. In 2011, museum staff added a self-led walking tour of the grounds to complement the tour of the log home.

Several outbuildings comprise the grounds of Davies Manor. Mose's Cabin is a small tenant cabin used to interpret the life of both slaves and tenant farmers on the plantation, and is named after Mose Frasier, a worker on the plantation in the late nineteenth and early to mid twentieth centuries. The Gotten Cabin is a 1948 structure built by a local family in the style and with the materials of the 1830s. The Liberty Cabin originated in Middle Tennessee and is built in the mid-Atlantic/ Pennsylvania style. Both cabins were moved to Davies Manor from Libertyland theme park in 2006.

Davies Manor was used as the setting for several scenes in the movie One Came Home (2010) directed by local film-maker Willy Bearden.

== Landscape ==
Davies Manor was given distinction as a Century Farm, or a Tennessee farm owned by the same family for over 100 years, until Ellen Davies-Rodger's death. It is recognized as a certified Backyard Habitat by the National Wildlife Federation, because of the extensive list of wildlife that makes the grounds of Davies Manor home. A pond to the rear of the property supports a variety of life, including fish, turtles, dragonflies, and frogs. The woods around the property also provide a home to various wildlife, including a number of deer who can often be seen wandering the grounds.

Davies Manor Association, Inc. has teamed with the Memphis Area Master Gardeners to create a series of gardens, which help interpret pioneer and farm life. These include a kitchen garden, herb garden, and shade garden. In addition, the Master Gardeners cultivate a Plant a Row garden. Vegetables from this garden benefit Youth Villages.

Family and local legend suggests that a slight mound to the front of the home is an Indian mound. Archaeological research debunked this claim, however, as no evidence was ever uncovered during a recent dig on plantation grounds. This myth likely came from the fact that Dr. Julius Augustus Davies was an avid collector of Indian artifacts and conducted several productive digs at his own plantation in Walls, Mississippi. An Indian trail likely did run near Davies Manor Plantation because of its proximity to water, and Dr. Davies did find artifacts on the Brunswick property. Dr. Davies's collection is housed at Mississippi State University.

== See also ==
- List of museums in Tennessee
