= Lairdland Farm House =

Historic house in Tennessee, United States

- U.S. National Register of Historic Places
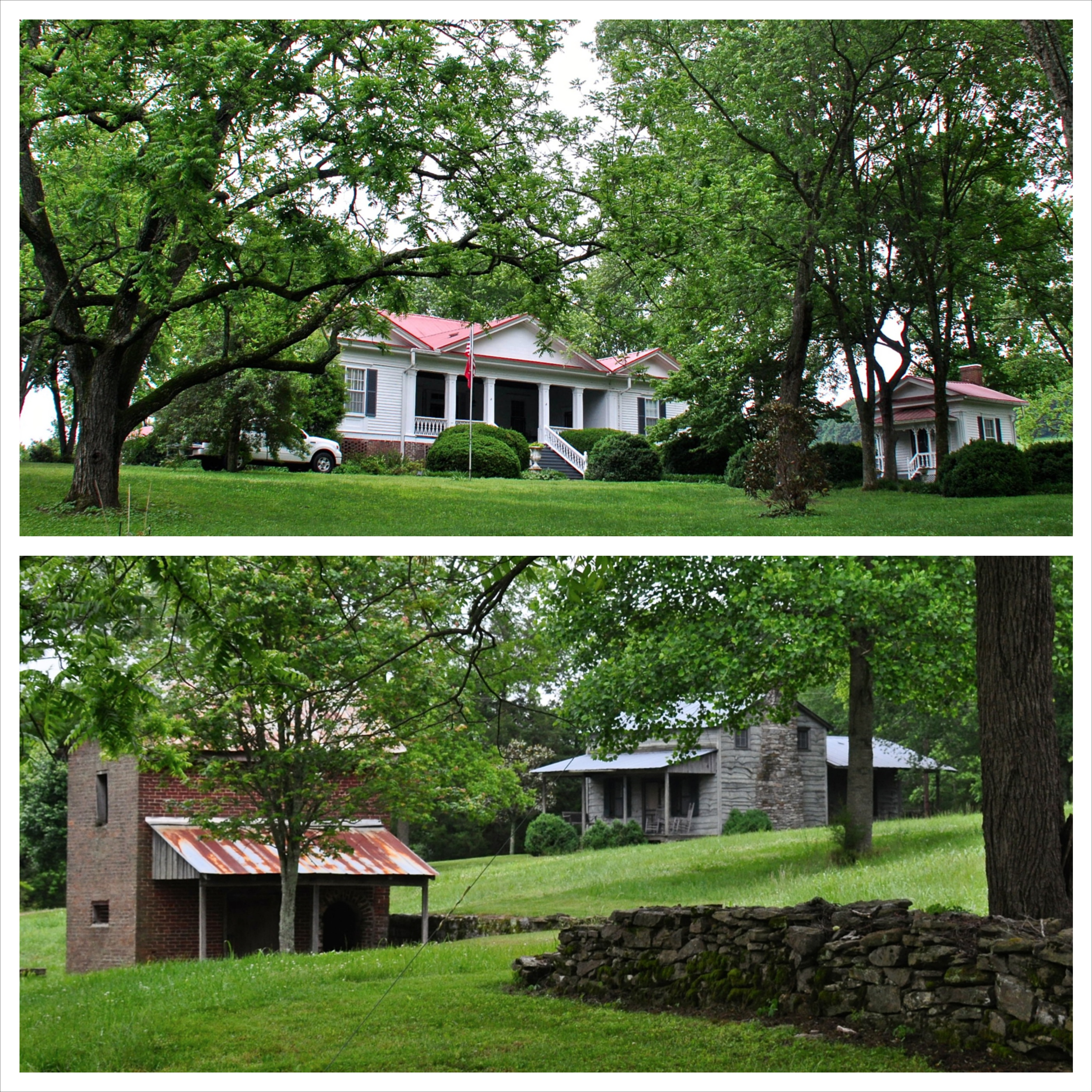
- The Lairdland Farm House in 2014

- Location within Tennessee
- Nearest city: Brick Church, Tennessee
- Coordinates: 35°16′33″N 86°54′0″W
- Area: 2 acres (0.81 ha)
- Built: 1830
- Architectural style: Greek Revival
- NRHP reference No.: 95001088
- Added to NRHP: September 7, 1995

The Lairdland Farm House is a historic farmhouse in Giles County, Tennessee, U.S..

== History ==
The land belonged to Thomas J. Lane when it was purchased by Robert Henderson Laird in the 1830. Shortly after, Laird built the farmhouse, and he designed it in the Greek Revival architectural style. During the American Civil War of 1861–1865, it served as a hospital for the Confederate States Army.

In 1867, it was passed on to Laird's daughter and her husband, James Knox Polk Blackburn. It was subsequently inherited by their son, Dr. James K. P. Blackburn. By the 1990s, the house belonged to James T. Blackburn IV. In 2002, it was purchased by Donald Rouleau.

The house has been listed on the National Register of Historic Places since September 7, 1995. It has a Civil War museum open to the public.
