= Dixon Gallery and Gardens =

Museum in Memphis, Tennessee

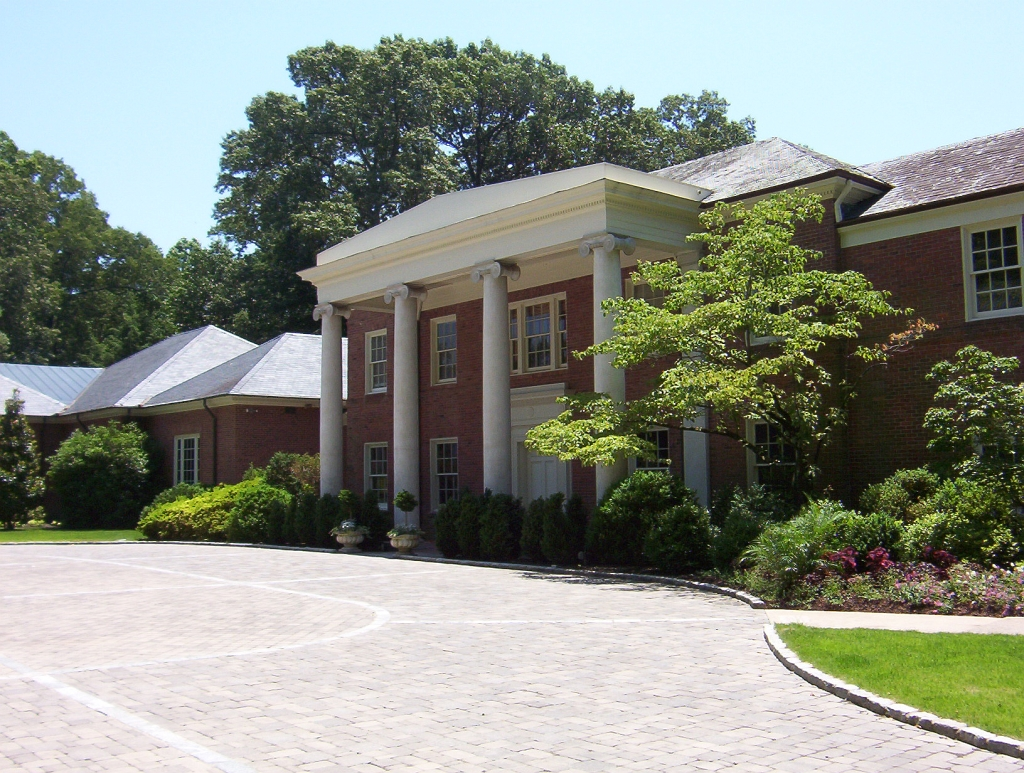
- The Dixon Gallery and Gardens
- Location: 4339 Park Avenue, Memphis, Tennessee
- Coordinates: 35.105971°N 89.917602°W
- Type: Art museum
- Public transit access: MATA

The Dixon Gallery and Gardens is an art museum within 17 acres of gardens, established in 1976, and located at 4339 Park Avenue, Memphis, Tennessee, United States.

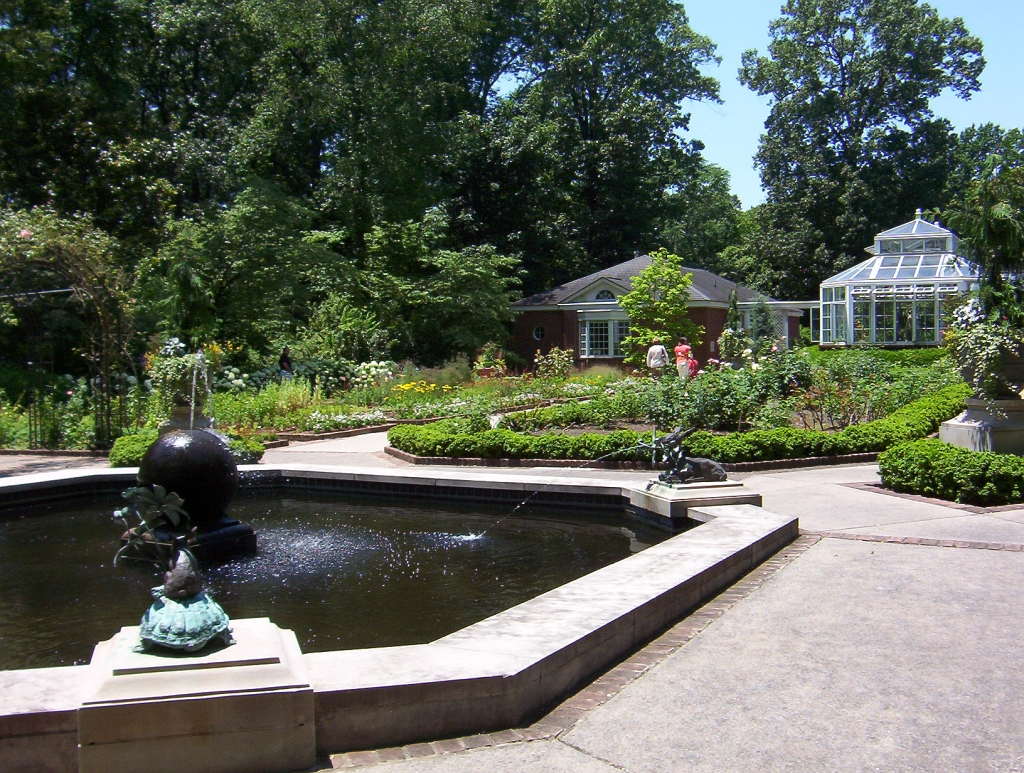
Sculpture gardens, conservatory, and fountain

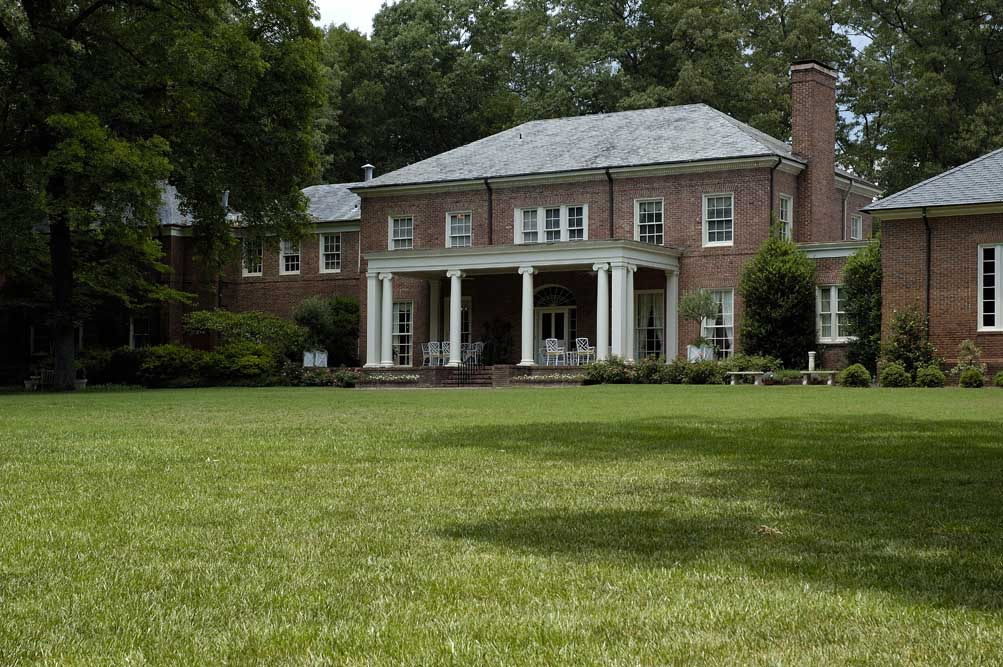
South Lawn gardens and rear museum facade

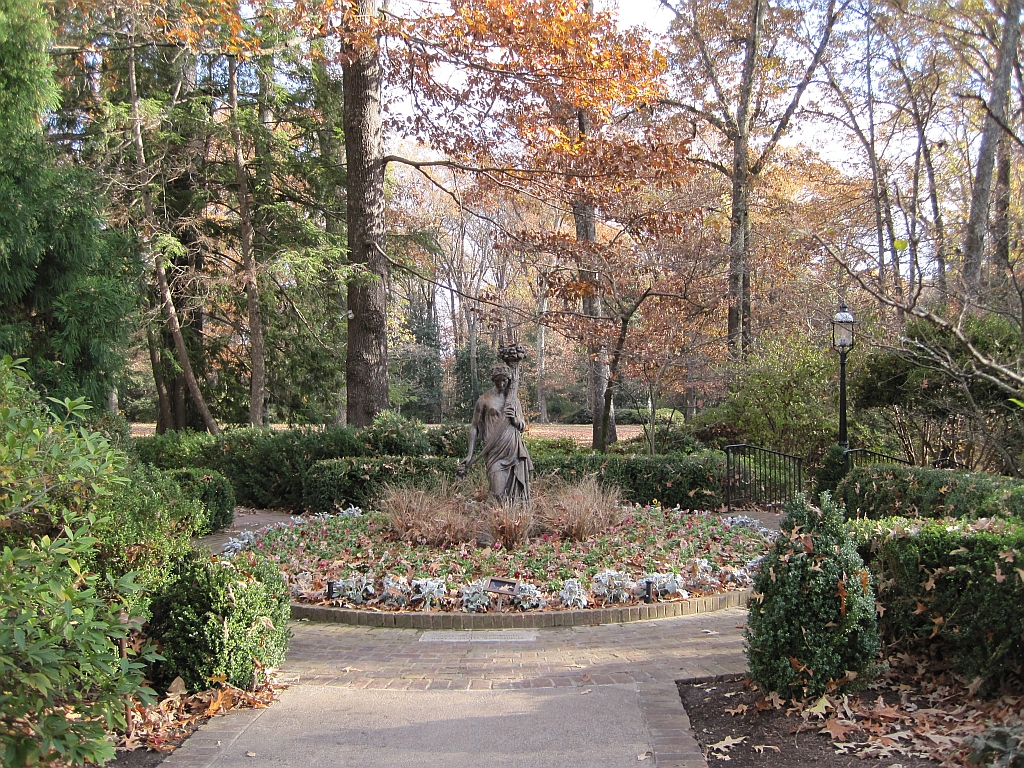
Sculpture in the Formal Gardens

The museum focuses on French and American impressionism and features works by Monet, Degas, and Renoir, Pierre Bonnard, Mary Cassatt, Marc Chagall, Honoré Daumier, Henri Fantin-Latour, Paul Gauguin, Henri Matisse, Berthe Morisot, Edvard Munch, Auguste Rodin, and Alfred Sisley, as well as an extensive collection of works by French Impressionist artist Jean-Louis Forain. The museum also houses the Stout Collection of 18th-century German porcelain. With nearly 600 pieces of tableware and figures, it is one of the such collections in the United States.

The Dixon also features a schedule of original and traveling exhibitions of fine art and horticulture.

The museum sits within four principal outdoor sculpture gardens with Greco-Roman sculpture. Its site was acquired by the Dixons in 1939, and landscaped in the English Garden style with open vistas adjacent to smaller, intimate formal spaces. The major areas within the gardens are the Cutting Garden, Formal Garden, South Lawn, and Woodland Gardens.

== Permanent collection ==
The original collection of paintings, on view in the Dixon residence, is devoted to French and American Impressionists, Post-Impressionists, and related schools. The core of the collection was acquired with the guidance of the late John Rewald, a leading authority on French Impressionism. The collection also includes 18th- and 19th-century British portraits and landscapes in keeping with Hugo Dixon's English heritage.

In accordance with the Dixon's interest, the museum has over the years acquired works by the French Impressionists who showed at one of the eight group Impressionist exhibitions. Also a priority are the works by other artists of the period, both Impressionist and Realist, who have not yet received the recognition of Degas, Monet, or Pissarro. An example of this is the Dixon's recent acquisition of 56 works by the French artist Jean-Louis Forain, this making the Dixon a major international repository of the artist's work.

In 1996, in conjunction with the museum's 20th anniversary, the Dixon acquired 23 paintings and sculptures in a gift purchase agreement with the Montgomery H.W. Ritchie family of Palo Duro, Texas. The Ritchie Collection greatly enhances the museum's holdings of Impressionist and Post-Impressionist works.

== Education ==
The Dixon Education Department promotes interest in the arts and horticulture through specific programming for children, adults, and outreach groups.

Some of the Dixon's programs include the children's program Mini Masters, the adult lecture series Munch and Learn, and the school outreach program Art to Grow.

== See also ==
- List of museums in Tennessee
- Index: Gardens in Tennessee
