= Belz Museum of Asian and Judaic Art =

Museum in Memphis, Tennessee

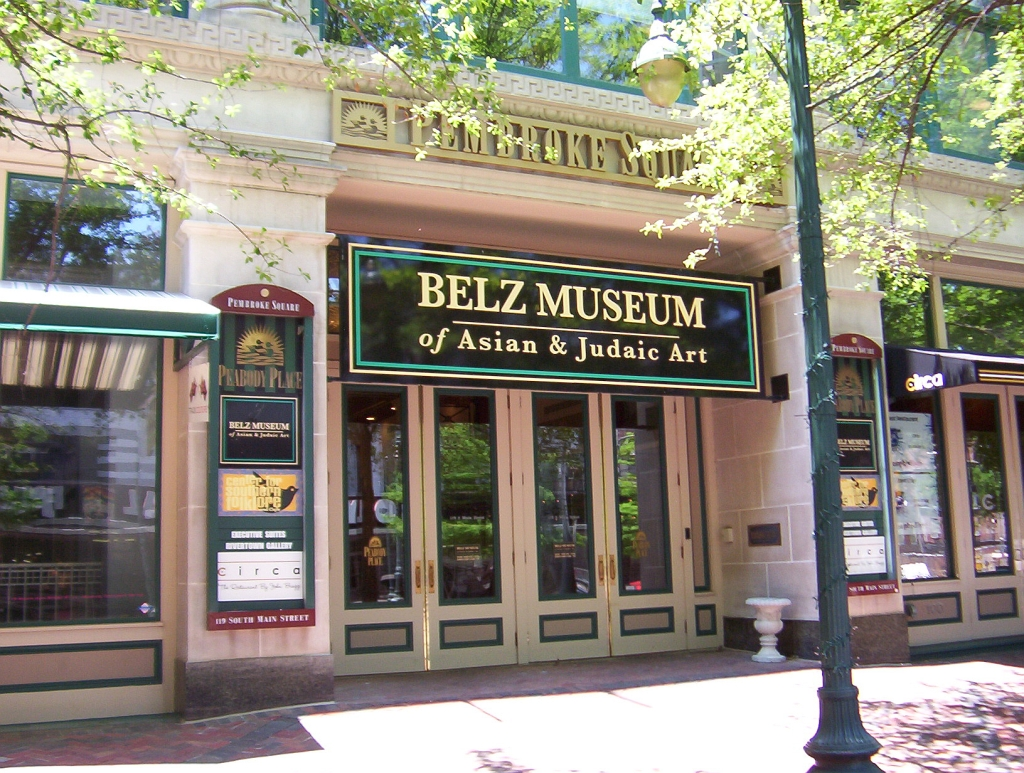
- Entrance to museum

- Location in Tennessee
- Established: 1998 as the "Peabody Place Museum"
- Location: 119 S Main St., Memphis, Tennessee
- Coordinates: 35.14178°N 90.05423°W
- Type: Asian and Judaic Art
- Public transit access: MATA Trolley: Main Street Line or Riverfront Loop at Beale St. Station
- Website: www.belzmuseum.org

The Belz Museum of Asian and Judaic Art is located at 119 South Main Street at the intersection of Gayoso Avenue in Memphis, Tennessee, USA. The museum was opened in 1998 as the Peabody Place Museum and in January 2007 it received its present name.

The museums collection is based on the private collection of Memphis developers Jack and Marilyn Belz, who owned the Peabody Hotel and Peabody Place. The Belz features over 1,000 objects, including works of jade, tapestries, furniture, carvings, and other historical and artistic objects. The museum also houses one of the finest collections of pieces from the Qing dynasty.

== See also ==
- List of museums in Tennessee
