= Live from Memphis =

Volunteer organization

Live From Memphis
- Founded: 2001
- Founder: Christopher Reyes
- Country of origin: United States
- Location: Memphis, Tennessee United States
- Official website: LiveFromMemphis.com

Live From Memphis is a volunteer organization supporting music, film, and art from Memphis, Tennessee. It was initially established in 2000 with a focus on capturing local music and showcasing it to the world. Reflective of such publications as The Rise of the Creative Class and The Memphis Manifesto (which focus on cultivating creativity as a critical resource to individual, community, and economic life) Live From Memphis seeks to serve and better its community through creating artist-based projects and providing resources and tools for its members.

== Offerings ==
Live From Memphis runs various projects throughout the year:

- The Li'l Film Fest: A quarterly, theme-based film festival, focusing on highlighting our local talent while showcasing interesting happenings around town.
- The Music Video Showcase: An annual showcase of local music videos. The showcase is held every October in conjunction with the larger Indie Memphis Film Festival run by Delta Axis.
- The Creative Directory: Memphis' only comprehensive artist and industry directory for Memphis Music, Film and the Arts.
- Live From Memphis also host various music, short films, videos, and works of art, all of which are locally produced.
