= Art Museum of the University of Memphis =

University art museum

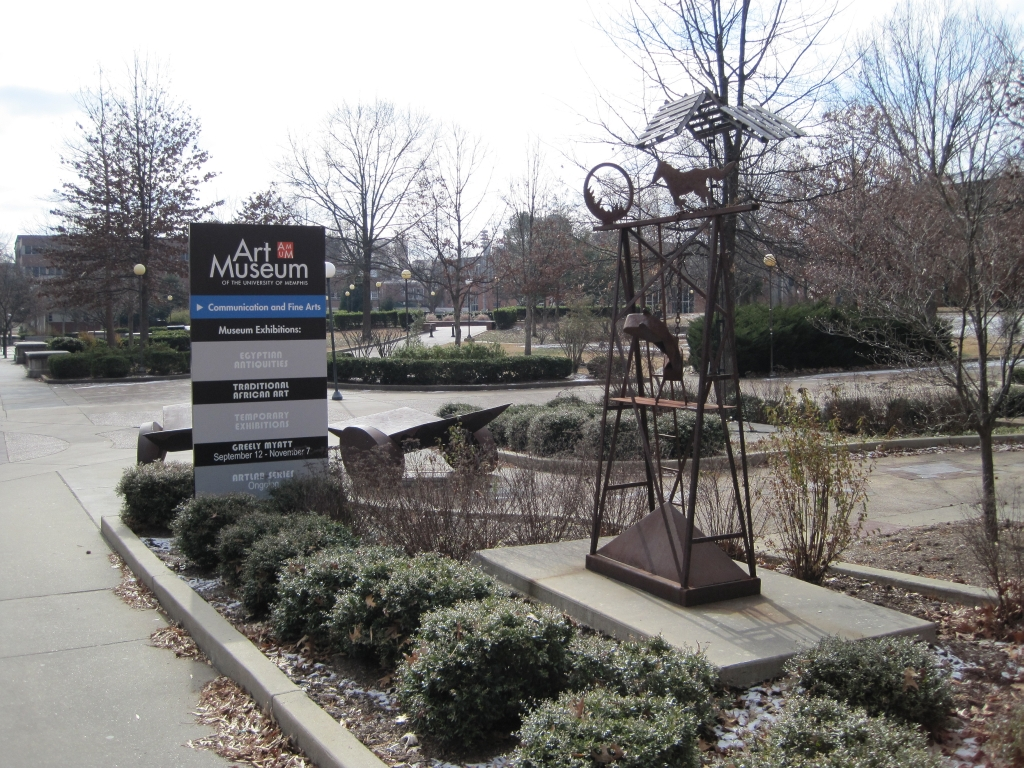
- Established: 1981 as "The University Gallery"
- Location: 3750 Norriswood Ave., Memphis, Tennessee
- Coordinates: 35.12152°N 89.93933°W
- Type: Contemporary art, Egyptian art and antiquities, African art and artifacts
- Director: Leslie Luebbers
- Public transit access: MATA Bus: Line 2C or 35, University of Memphis stop
- Website: https://www.memphis.edu/amum/

The Art Museum of the University of Memphis (AMUM) is located at 3750 Norriswood Avenue in Memphis, Tennessee, USA. It is the principal museum of the University of Memphis. The museum opened in 1981 as The University Gallery; in 1994 the changed to reflect the collecting status of the organization.

The museum is open from Monday to Saturday from 9 am until 5 pm, it is closed on University holidays. Admission to the museum is free and there is no charge for tours.

== Permanent exhibits ==
The museum houses several permanent exhibits. One permanent exhibit is the "Egyptian Collection" of antiquities and archaeological artifacts. The first 44 objects of the Egyptian exhibit were purchased from the Museum of Fine Arts in Boston, Massachusetts in 1975. The collection of Egyptian antiquities at the Art Museum of the University of Memphis is the largest collection of its kind in the Southern United States. More objects were added to the collection by donations from individuals or institutions.

The second permanent exhibit is “Windows on Africa, which offers a glimpse into the visual expressions that have shaped, and continue to shape, African societies. At its core, African art embodies innovation and interpretation, reflecting a deep connection to spirituality, community, and the environment. Drawing from its expansive collection of approximately 1000 traditional African works, the galleries explore the depth and diversity of African visual arts through five major thematic exhibitions: Architecture, Daily Life, Spirituality, Metal Arts and Masquerade.

The Samual H. Crone (1858-1913) collection consists of this Memphis' artists paintings, drawings and archives. AMUM also houses and collections of works on paper consisting of drawings, fine art prints, and historic popular prints. In addition, various collections of Mediterranean and American artifacts and antiquities offer opportunities for student study.

== Temporary exhibits ==
AMUM's main gallery and the Samuel H. Crone Gallery host temporary exhibitions primarily of contemporary art and ones curated from the collections in collaboration with guest artists and curators. Students in the Interdisciplinary Graduate Certificate in Museum Studies as well as undergraduates also collaborate with staff on the development and presentation of exhibitions.

== Certificate program ==
The Interdisciplinary Graduate Certificate in Museum Studies is a offered by the Department of Art and Design in collaboration with the Department of Anthropology and taught by museum professionals affiliated with those departments and led by the Art Museum Director. The certificate requires 18 credit hours consisting of two core courses, two elective courses selected to advance each student's specific professional objectives, and two museum internships. The formal courses are taught on line and internships may be online, hybrid, or on premises with any cooperating museum. Successful applicants must have completed or be simultaneously enrolled in a masters or doctoral program in any relevant discipline.

== See also ==
- University of Memphis
- List of museums in Tennessee
