= Memphis Railroad & Trolley Museum =

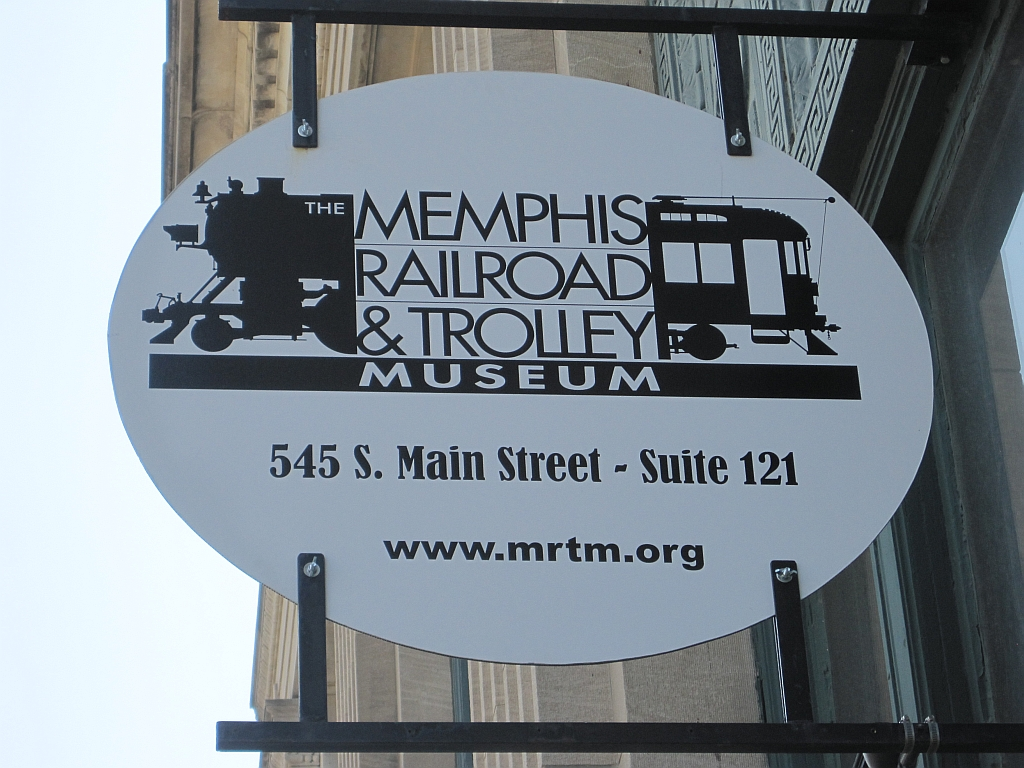
- Established: 2012
- Location: 545 South Main Street, Suite 121, Memphis, Tennessee
- Coordinates: 35.13207°N 90.059156°W
- Type: Railway Museum
- Public transit access: MATA Trolley: Main Street Line at Butler Ave. stop or Riverfront Loop at Central Station stop
- Website: old.mrtm.org

The Memphis Railroad & Trolley Museum is located at 545 South Main Street on the ground floor of the Central Station in Memphis, Tennessee, US. The museum is dedicated to document the local history of Railroad and the Memphis Trolleys. The museum provides static exhibits as well as video documentation and railroad model dioramas.

== Staff ==
The museum is operated as a non-profit organisation and is staffed by volunteers.

== See also ==
- Central Station (Memphis)
- MATA Trolley
- List of museums in Tennessee
