= The Cotton Museum =

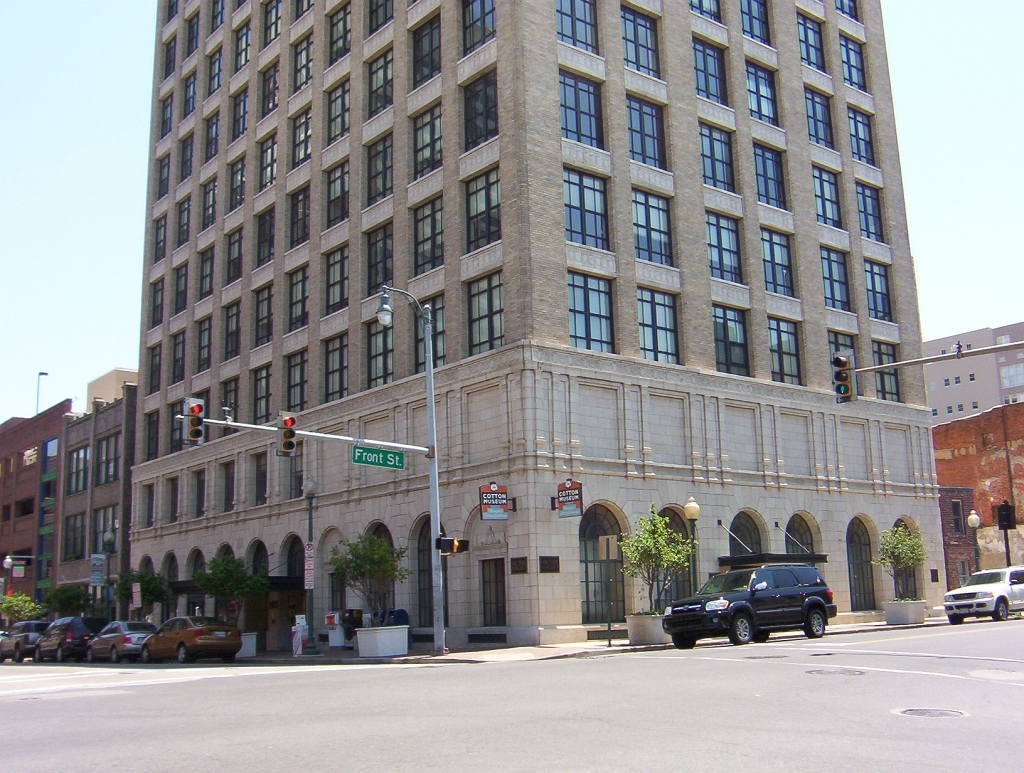
- Memphis Cotton Exchange building
- Established: March 2006
- Location: 65 Union Avenue, Memphis, Tennessee
- Coordinates: 35.1433°N 90.0546°W
- Type: Textile museum
- Public transit access: Main Street Line; Riverfront Loop
- Website: https://www.memphiscottonmuseum.org

The Cotton Museum, located in Memphis, Tennessee, U.S., is an historical and cultural museum that opened in March 2006 on the former trading floor of the Memphis Cotton Exchange at 65 Union Avenue in downtown Memphis.

The mission of the Cotton Museum is to share the story of the cotton industry and its many influences on the daily life, arts, and the development of the mid-South region. The museum highlights artifacts through interpretive exhibits, educational programs, and research archives that help tell the story of cotton and cotton trading, from crop to becoming fabric.

The Cotton Museum preserves the history of the cotton business and its impact on economics, history, society and culture, and science and technology. The museum's exhibits are appropriate for field trips for middle schoolers and older, and provide visitors context for other attractions in the city.

== See also ==
- List of museums in Tennessee
