= Historic Collinsville =

Coordinates: 36.376°N 87.282°W

Historic Collinsville, located in south Montgomery County, Tennessee in Southside, is a recreated village that offers a glimpse into mid 19th century life. It contains era specific homes and buildings. Many events are held to celebrate history and the community. Buildings range from 1803 until the turn of the century.
