= Memphis Cotton Exchange =

Former commodity exchange in Memphis, Tennessee

Coordinates: 35.1433°N 90.0546°W

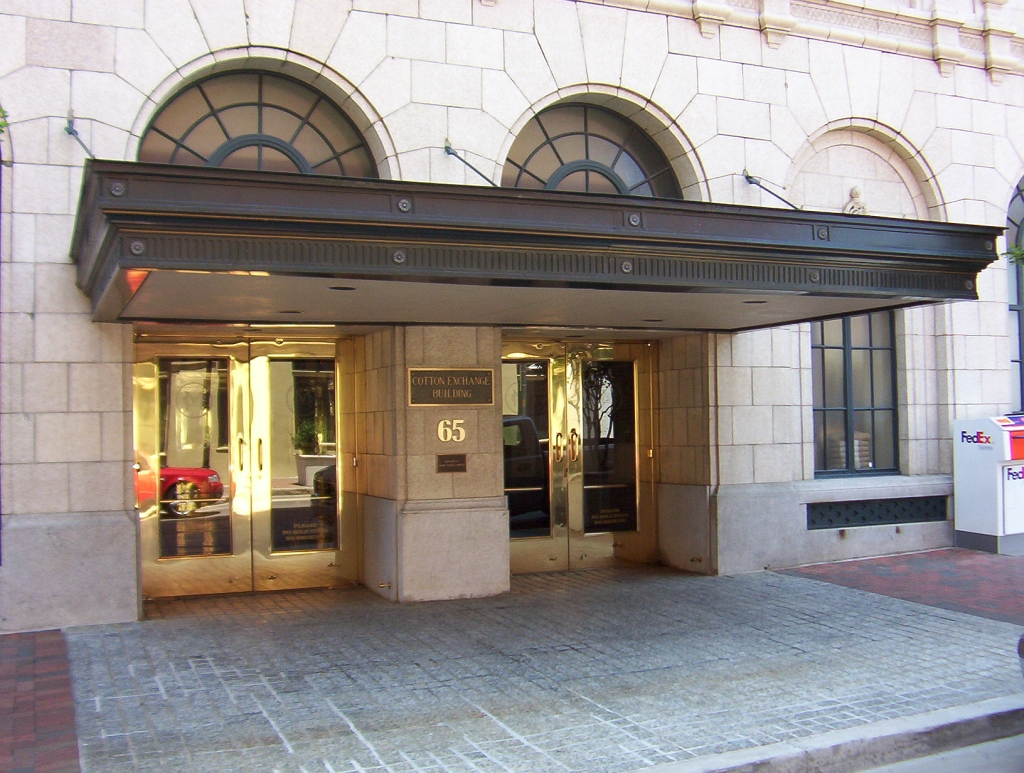
- Company type: Private Organization
- Industry: Cotton
- Founded: 1874
- Headquarters: Memphis, Tennessee, United States
- Products: Current building constructed 1925

The Memphis Cotton Exchange is located in downtown Memphis, Tennessee, United States, on the corner of Front Street and Union Avenue. It was founded in 1874 as a result of the growing cotton market in Memphis, where trade was strong after the American Civil War. The first Cotton Exchange building was constructed in 1885. It was replaced by the Exchange Building in 1910, which housed it until a newer Cotton Exchange Building was completed in 1925.

== History and location ==
Cotton merchants needed a trade organization to regulate cotton marketing in the city. They were also aware of the many benefits reaped by the New York Cotton Exchange and the New Orleans Cotton Exchange. Once established, the exchange produced rules and regulation on cotton trading and set standards for buying and pricing cotton in Memphis and the mid-South. The exchange developed a method for grading cotton to which members agreed. It operated as a "spot market" and never developed futures trading except for two short-lived experiments. The exchange developed as a source of information about world markets, and cotton merchants found they had to join as members in order to compete. The exchange also promoted "Memphis cotton" in major markets such as New York and London.

For a time the Cotton Exchange was housed in what is now called the Exchange Building, built in 1910 on 9 North Second Street in Memphis. The tall, 20-story building credited to N. M. Woods housed both the Cotton and Merchant exchanges for a period. Since the decline of the exchanges in the late 20th century with diversification of the economy, it has been renovated for use as an apartment building.

When the exchanges decided to have separate locations, the Memphis Cotton Exchange had a multi-story building constructed on Union Avenue; the Cotton Exchange Building opened in 1922. Cotton trading was done on the first floor, and only members of the exchange were allowed to trade there. In 1978, the trading floor was closed in favor of computer trading. The historic floor has since been remodeled and is now home to The Cotton Museum; it is used to educate the public about the industry and agriculture of cotton, the commodity crop that built the wealth of the city of Memphis for decades.

== Presidents of the Memphis Cotton Exchange ==
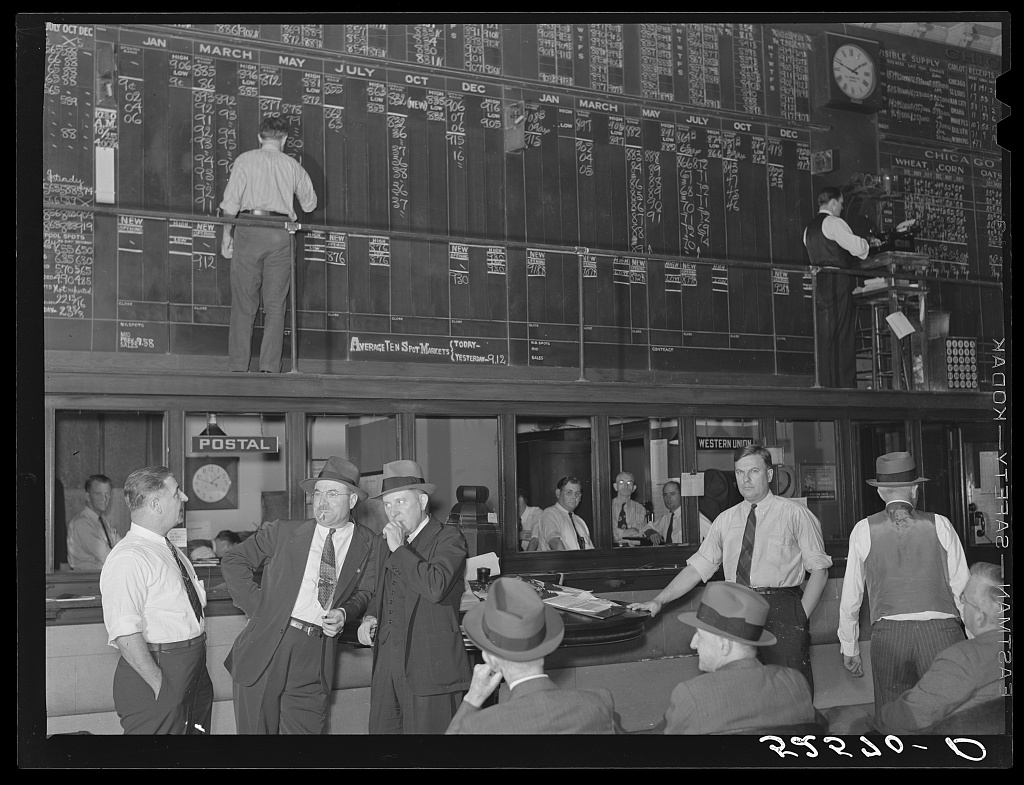
Interior of Memphis Cotton Exchange just before closing for the day, 1939.

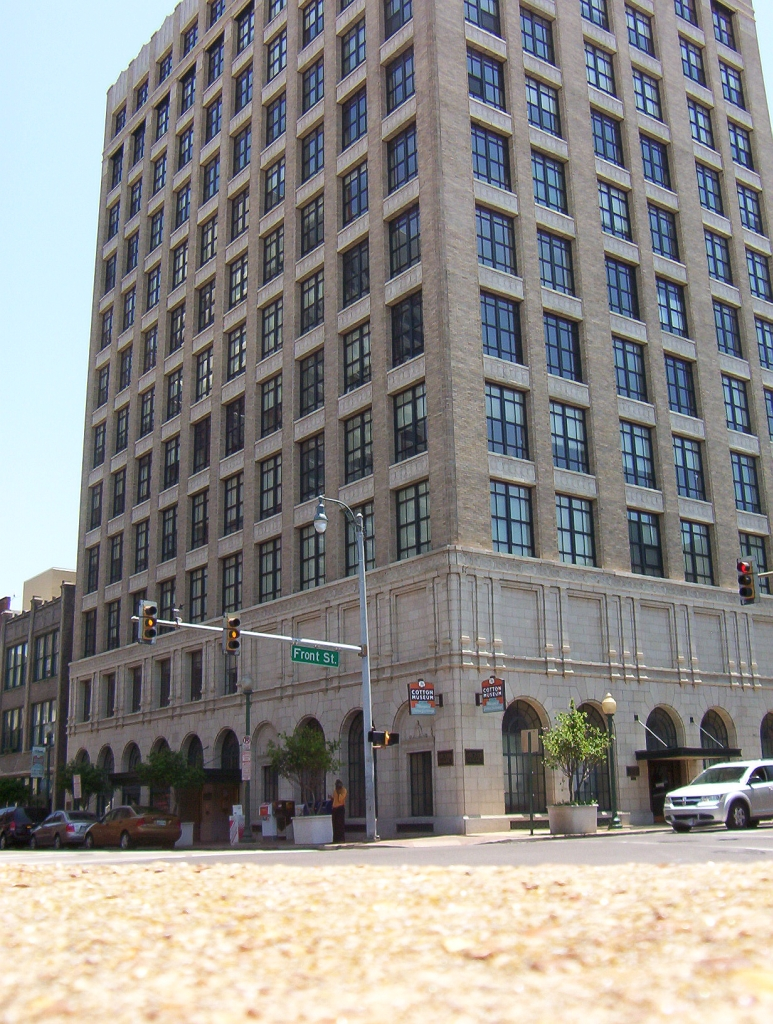
Cotton Exchange Building (2009), location of the Cotton Museum

1873-1876 W. B. Galbreath

1876-1879 J. T. Pettit

1879-1881 D. P. Hadden

1881-1883 Napoleon Hill

1883-1885 C. P. Hunt

1885-1887 W. J. Crawford

1887-1889 L. B. Suggs

1889-1891 Emmett L. Woodson

1891-1893 H. M. Neely

1893-1895 E. B. Carroll

1895-1897 I. McD. Massey

1897-1899 F. M. Norfleet

1899-1900 C. C. Cowan

1900-1901 W. A. Gage

1901-1902 Cleland K. Smith

1902-1903 N. C. Richards

1903-1904 E. W. Porter

1904-1905 E. F. Webber

1905-1906 Dennis Smith

1906-1907 J. J. Shoemaker

1907-1908 F. M. Crump

1908-1909 R. S. Bryan

1909-1910 John Sneed Williams

1910-1911 W. J. Abston

1911-1912 John Sneed Williams

1912-1913 F. G. Barton

1913-1914 C. W. Butler

1914-1915 C. A. Lacy

1915-1916 B. B. Beecher

1916-1917 George W. Fisher

1917-1918 D. S. Weaver

1918-1919 W. L. McKee

1919-1920 I. H. Barnwell

1910-1921 J. L. Cooke

1921-1922 W. J. Britton

1922-1923 J. P. Norfleet

1923-1924 Ben G. Humphreys

1924-1925 H. G. Thompson

1925-1926 S. B. Wilson

1926-1927 R. B. Barton

1927-1928 J. C. Lutz

1928-1929 W. W. Trigg

1929-1930 F. B. Smithwick

1930-1931 I. H. Barnwell Jr.

1931-1932 Everett Richard Cook

1932-1933 F. G. Barton

1933-1934 Henry H. Haizlip

1934-1935 Frank T. Donelson

1935-1936 Caffey Robertson

1936-1937 George J. Eckert

1937-1938 C. L. Andrews

1938-1939 W. A. Wooten

1939-1940 Fred W. Lucas

1940-1941 C. W. Hussey

1941-1942 Russell C. Gregg

1942-1943 John A. DuPre

1943-1944 S. Y. West

1944-1945 N. F. Dalrymple

1945-1946 T. F. Jackson Jr.

1946-1947 Robert J. Hussey

1947-1948 Thomas J. White

1948-1949 Mather T. Richards

1949-1950 A. M. Crawford

1950-1951 John S. Dillard

1951-1952 C. L. Patton

1952-1953 H. R. Altick

1953-1954 Parks Kinnett

1954-1955 Lewis K. McKee

1955-1956 J. W. Johnson

1956-1957 J. W. Ramsey

1957-1958 William Dunavant

1958-1959 F. M. Crump

1959-1960 J. T. Murff

1960-1961 Berry B. Brooks

1961-1962 Hugh Francis

1962-1963 William W. Deupree

1963-1964 Eric D. Hirsch

1964-1965 H. D. Taylor

1965-1966 Robert J. Hussey

1966-1967 Hugh Francis

1967-1968 R. H. Allen Jr.

1968-1969 Frank G Barton Jr.

1969-1970 Walter Walsh

1970-1971 Berry B. Brooks

1971-1972 R. G. Gardner

1972-1973 Earl Crocker

1973-1974 Molloy H. Miller

1974-1975 Frank M. Weathersby
