= Fire Museum of Memphis =

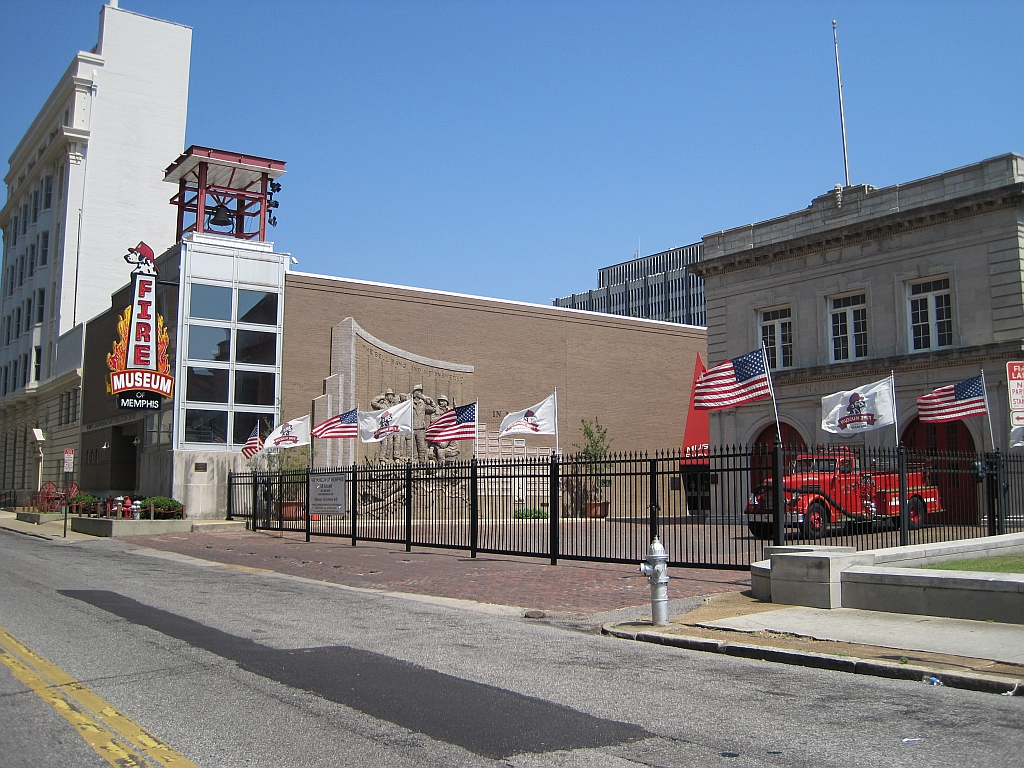
- Established: 1998
- Location: 118 Adams Ave, Memphis, Tennessee
- Coordinates: 35.14816°N 90.05098°W
- Type: Fire museum
- Director: Penny Smith
- Public transit access: MATA Trolley: Main Street Line at Jefferson Ave. Station
- Website: www.firemuseum.com

The Fire Museum of Memphis is a fire museum in Memphis, Tennessee. The museum is dedicated to documenting and promoting the local history of firefighting and educating the public in fire safety.

The Fire Museum of Memphis works with the University of Memphis to capture data on the effectiveness of their fire prevention curriculum. Local schools are offered free admission with bus transportation reimbursement, drastically impacting a fire fatality rate that was two and one half times the national average when the museum opened in October 1998. The museum provides interactive exhibits as well as video documentation.

== History ==
Construction on the museum began in 1996. In 2014, the museum underwent a $1.5 million renovation, adding a new arcade room.

== Exhibits ==
The Fire Museum of Memphis is located in the Fire Engine House No. 1, which was built in 1910. Historic exhibits in the museum date back to the late 1800s and early 1900s. Several historic fire engines that were used by the Memphis Fire Department are on display at the museum.

- 1910 Crump Steamer
- 1912 American LaFrance
- 1929 American LaFrance Pumper

Other exhibits consist of antique firefighting equipment, historic uniforms, American and European firefighter's helmets, badges, lanterns, antique fire fighting toys and fire engine scale models. A fire simulation room recreates the experience of being in a burning house. Video stations document the history of the Memphis Fire Department and the "Great Fires of Memphis." Outside of the museum, a memorial wall is dedicated to the Memphis fire fighters who have died in the line of duty.

== See also ==
- Fire safety
- Fire station
- List of museums in Tennessee
