= Southside, Montgomery County, Tennessee =

Southside, Tennessee
- Unincorporated community
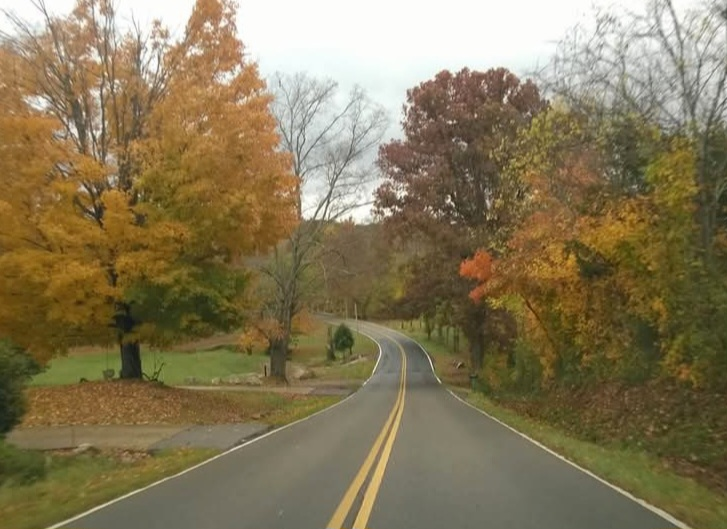
- Autumn foliage in Southside

- Location within Tennessee Location within the United States
- Coordinates: 36°22′17″N 87°17′44″W
- Country: United States
- State: Tennessee
- County: Montgomery
- Elevation: 597 ft (182 m)
- Time zone: UTC-6 (Central (CST))
  - Summer (DST): UTC-5 (CDT)
- ZIP code: 37171
- Area code: 931
- GNIS feature ID: 1270923

Southside is an unincorporated community in Montgomery County, Tennessee, United States. Southside is located in the southeast corner of the county, 11.5 miles (18.5 km) south-southeast of Clarksville. Southside had a post office until it closed on October 12, 2002; it still has its own ZIP code, 37171.

Historic Collinsville, a living museum of 19th-century life, is located near Southside. The Lafayette Furnace, which is listed on the National Register of Historic Places, is also near the community.

== History ==
Settled by the Collins family in the early 19th century, the community was first known as Collinsville, with John Collins being a blacksmith and his brother running the post office. The community's name became Southside on March 25, 1880, when the post office was renamed.

Education has played a central role in the community since the 19th century, beginning with a log schoolhouse that also served religious purposes.

Free public schools were established in Southside on June 3, 1876. Around 1891, the Southside Preparatory School was founded under principal P. L. Harned, who later served as Tennessee Commissioner of Education. The institution offered advanced coursework in mathematics, languages, sciences, and literature and accepted boarding students from surrounding areas. Graduates were eligible for direct admission to universities such as the University of Tennessee and Vanderbilt University.

The school transitioned to public control in 1918 and later operated as Southside High School until its consolidation with Montgomery Central High School in 1940. The elementary school closed in 1965 due to declining enrollment.

== Education ==
Southside residents attend schools in the Clarksville-Montgomery County School System (CMCSS), which serves Montgomery County. There are no public school facilities located within Southside itself.

Students are zoned to schools in the Cunningham area, including Montgomery Central Elementary School, Montgomery Central Middle School, and Montgomery Central High School, located along U.S. Route 48/13.

== Demographics ==
As of the 2023 American Community Survey (ACS) 5-year estimates, the population of Southside (ZIP code 37171) was 1,552. Southside’s gender distribution was 52.8% male and 47.2% female. The median age in the community was approximately 40 years. The age breakdown was approximately 20.6% under 15 years, 11.2% aged 15–24, 28.6% aged 25–44, 24.5% aged 45–64, and 15.2% aged 65 or older.

== Government ==
As an unincorporated area, it does not have a formal municipal mayor. The community relies on services provided by the county government under the leadership of Montgomery County Mayor Wes Golden.
