= ʽAmum =

Coordinates: 15°08′N 49°08′E

`Amum
- Interactive map of `Amum
- Country: Yemen
- Governorate: Hadhramaut Governorate
- Time zone: UTC+3 (Yemen Standard Time)

`Amum is a village in eastern Yemen. It is located in the Hadhramaut Governorate.
