= Adams Avenue =

Historic road in Memphis, Tennessee

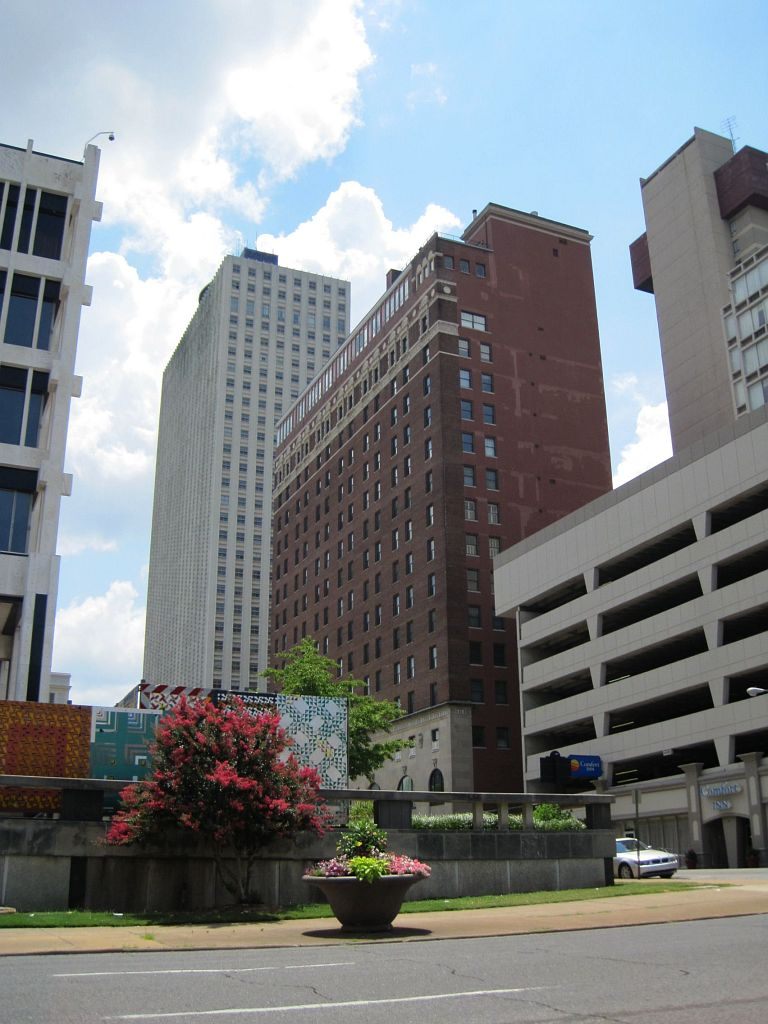
Adams Avenue

Adams Avenue is a historic road in Memphis, Tennessee. Once known as millionaire's row, it was home to numerous mansions, and was where Nathan Bedford Forrest once operated a giant slave market, said to be the South's largest, that boasted "the best selected assortment of field hands, house servants, and mechanics ... with fresh supplies of likely Young Negroes."

Historic buildings on Adams Avenue include the Calvary Episcopal Church at 102 North Second Street at Adams Avenue; the Magevney House at 198 Adams Avenue; the Mallory–Neely House at 652 Adams Avenue; the Fire Museum of Memphis in Fire Engine House No. 1 at 118 Adams Avenue; the Mollie Fontaine Taylor House at 679 Adams Avenue; the Shelby County Courthouse, designed by James Gamble Rogers; the Woodruff-Fontaine House; and the James Lee House.

Several homes on the 100 and 200 blocks of Adams Avenue are in the Adams Avenue Historic District. The Victorian Village historic district includes portions of higher-numbered blocks of Adams Avenue.

== See also ==
- National Register of Historic Places listings in Shelby County, Tennessee
