= Adams Avenue (disambiguation) =

Adams Avenue is a historic road in Memphis, Tennessee.

Adams Avenue may also refer to:

- Adams Avenue Bridge, a historic bridge in Philadelphia, Pennsylvania
- Adams Avenue Bridge (San Diego), in San Diego, California
- Adams Avenue Parkway, a toll road in Utah

== See also ==
- Adams Avenue Historic District, district in Memphis, Tennessee
