= Environment of Tennessee =

Overview of the environment of the U.S. state of Tennessee

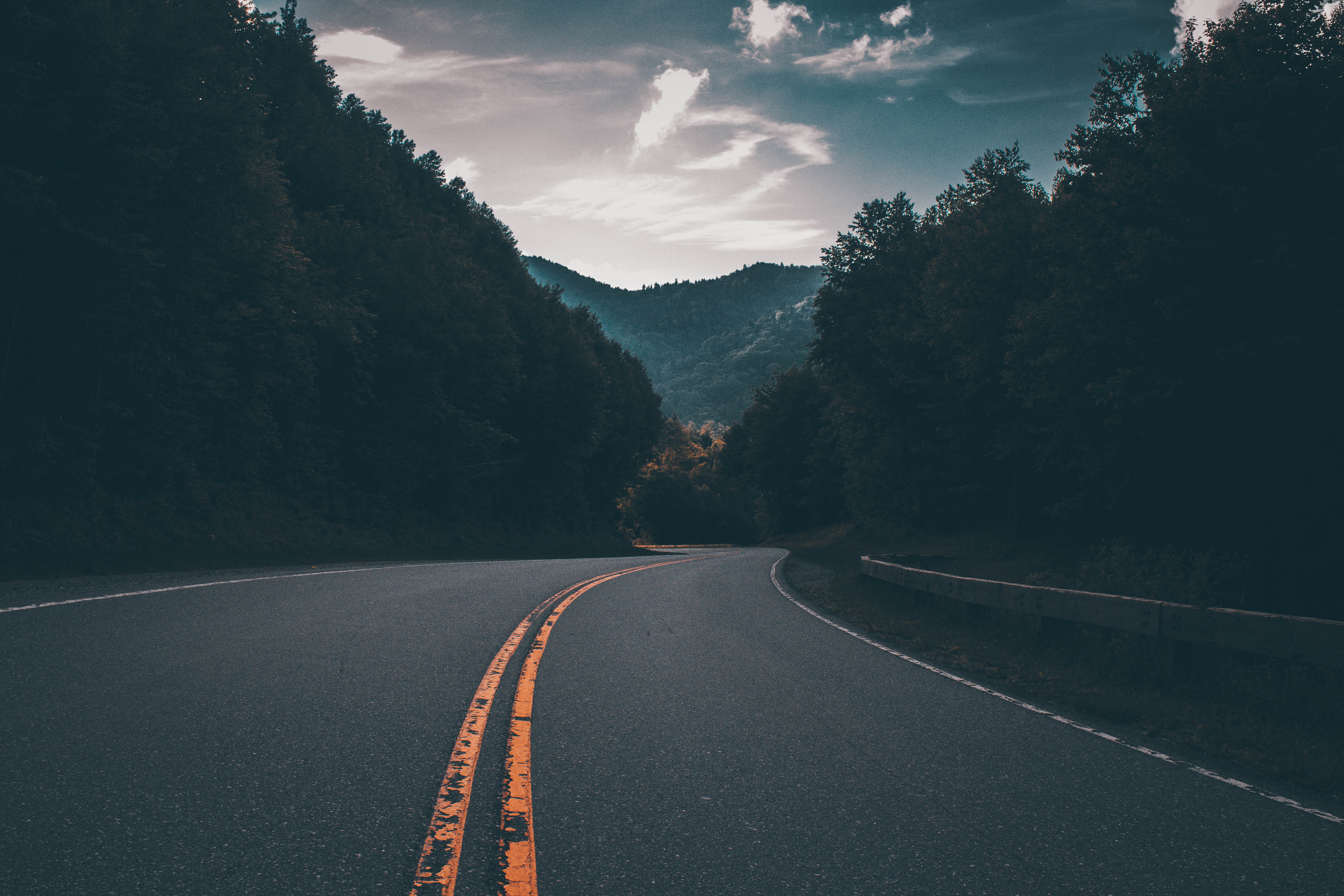
Road going through Great Smoky Mountains in Sevier County, Tennessee

The environment of Tennessee in the United States encompasses a wide array of ecosystems, from mountain forests and rich river valleys to wetlands and grasslands. Tennessee lies within the Southeast United States and is physically shaped by features including the Appalachian Mountains, the Cumberland Plateau, and the expansive river systems of the Mississippi River watershed. Its diverse landscapes support abundant wildlife, extensive forests, freshwater resources, and have drawn generations of residents and visitors alike.

== Physiogeographic regions and geology ==
Politically, Tennessee is broken up into three Grand Divisions: East, Middle, and West. Physically, Tennessee is also separated into three main types of landforms: river valley plain, highlands and basins, and mountains.

Geologically, Tennessee can be broadly divided into four major regions:

- The Appalachian Mountains in the east contain the Great Smoky Mountains and other subranges, characterized by steep ridges, valleys, and some of the oldest rocks in the state.
- The Cumberland Plateau and highlands occupy the central and eastern portions of the state, with flat-topped mountains, sandstone outcrops, and extensive caves.
- The interior lowlands and river valleys, including the Tennessee River and Mississippi River floodplains, form broad alluvial plains with fertile soils.
- Western Tennessee consists of gently rolling hills and lowlands extending toward the Mississippi River, shaped by glacial and fluvial processes.

Tennessee’s rivers and streams, including the Duck River, Tennessee River, and Cumberland River, drain into the Mississippi River watershed, supporting rich biodiversity and contributing to the state’s agricultural productivity.

Coal, limestone, and other mineral resources are extracted across Tennessee, especially in the eastern mountains and central plateau regions.

== Climate ==
Tennessee’s climate varies across the state, with the eastern mountains cooler and the western lowlands warmer and more humid.

=== Climate change impacts ===
Climate change in Tennessee has altered precipitation patterns, increased the frequency of droughts and extreme weather events, and affected terrestrial and freshwater ecosystems.

=== Water resources and conservation ===
More than 17,000 miles of Tennessee streams are impaired under the Clean Water Act, and many lakes face water quality challenges due to pollution and land use pressures.

== Ecology ==
Tennessee’s ecology reflects its physiographic diversity, ranging from mountain forests to river floodplains and wetlands. The state supports multiple ecoregions and habitats:

- Temperate deciduous forests dominate the eastern and central mountains, with species like oak, hickory, and tulip poplar.
- Grasslands and prairies, although rare, are important for pollinators and grassland birds.
- Wetlands and floodplain forests occur throughout the Mississippi and Tennessee River valleys, supporting amphibians, waterfowl, and aquatic plants.

Tennessee hosts a rich assemblage of wildlife, including over 89 mammal species, 70 amphibians, 61 reptiles, 325 fish, and more than 340 bird species.

== Nature centers ==
The state features numerous nature centers providing environmental education, outdoor recreation, and wildlife observation. Well‑known centers include Discovery Center at Murfree Spring, Lichterman Nature Center, and Owl's Hill Nature Center. Nashville’s parks system includes Beaman Park Nature Center, Bells Bend Outdoor Center, Shelby Bottoms Nature Center, and Warner Park Natural Center.

== Biodiversity ==
=== Forests and terrestrial habitats ===
Forests cover more than 50 percent of Tennessee’s landscape, comprising nearly 14 million acres of predominantly hardwood and mixed forests. The Great Smoky Mountains host one of the richest temperate tree diversities in the world.

=== Freshwater ecosystems ===
Tennessee contains more than 60,000 miles of streams and over 580,000 acres of lakes and reservoirs. The Duck River is one of the most biodiverse rivers in North America.

== Flora ==
Tennessee’s native flora includes thousands of plant species adapted to mountain, forest, grassland, and wetland habitats:

- Astragalus bibullatus
- Eriogonum longifolium var. harperi
- Isoetes lacustris
- Rock gnome lichen
- Sarracenia oreophila
- Utricularia inflata
- Utricularia radiata

=== Trees ===
- Abies fraseri
- Ulmus serotina

== Protected lands ==
Tennessee has a wide range of parks and protected lands, including:

- Great Smoky Mountains National Park
- Lamar Alexander Rocky Fork State Park
- Seven Islands State Birding Park
- Shelby Farms

== Nature and environmental policy ==
The Tennessee Department of Environment and Conservation (TDEC) manages air, water, land, and natural resources, coordinating with federal and local partners.

== Threats and conservation challenges ==
Threats include habitat loss, invasive species, water pollution, and climate change impacts. Conservation organizations focus on habitat restoration, water quality, forest management, and biodiversity protection.

== See also ==
- Geology of Tennessee
- List of Superfund sites in Tennessee
- Climate change in Tennessee
- Tennessee Wildlife Resources Agency
