= List of nature centers in Tennessee =

Tennessee Nature Centers (Hover mouse over pog to popup clickable link)

This is a list of nature centers and environmental education centers in the state of Tennessee.

To use the sortable tables: click on the icons at the top of each column to sort that column in alphabetical order; click again for reverse alphabetical order.

Name	Location	County	Region	Summary
Bays Mountain Park	Kingsport	Sullivan	East Tennessee	3,550-acre (1,440-hectare) nature preserve and city-owned park, features 44-acre (18-hectare) lake, a nature center with a planetarium theater, animal exhibits, and an adventure ropes course
Beaman Park Nature Center	Nashville	Davidson	Middle Tennessee	website, operated by the City, over 1,700 acres (690 hectares)
Bells Bend Outdoor Center	Nashville	Davidson	Middle Tennessee	website, 808 acres (327 hectares), operated by the City
Bowie Nature Park	Fairview	Williamson	Middle Tennessee	website, over 700 acres (280 hectares), operated by the City, includes a nature center with exhibits and art, Monkey Treehouse playground, outdoor classroom
Cedars of Lebanon State Park	Lebanon	Wilson	Middle Tennessee	900 acres (360 hectares), features the Merritt Nature Center
Discovery Center at Murfree Spring	Murfreesboro	Rutherford	Middle Tennessee	20 acres (8.1 hectares) of wetlands, children's museum with themes of the arts, culture, science, health and the environment
Fall Creek Falls State Park	Pikeville	Bledsoe	East Tennessee	Over 25,000 acres (10,000 hectares), Betty Dunn Nature Center
Great Smoky Mountains Institute at Tremont	Townsend	Blount	East Tennessee	website, residential environmental learning center in Great Smoky Mountains National Park
Ijams Nature Center	Knoxville	Knox	East Tennessee	website, 300 acres (120 hectares), partly supported by the City
Lichterman Nature Center	Memphis	Shelby	West Tennessee	65 acres (26 hectares), certified arboretum and nature center, part of the Pink Palace Family of Museums
Meeman-Shelby Forest State Park	Millington	Shelby	West Tennessee	13,467 acres (5,450 hectares), features the Meeman Museum and Nature Center
Owl's Hill Nature Center	Brentwood	Williamson	Middle Tennessee	160 acres (65 hectares), open to individuals and groups on a reservation basis
Reelfoot Lake State Park	Tiptonville	Lake	West Tennessee	200 acres (81 hectares) broken into 10 segments, features the R.C. Donaldson Memorial Museum, a natural history museum and nature center
Reflection Riding Arboretum and Nature Center	Chattanooga	Hamilton	East Tennessee	317-acre (128-hectare) arboretum, 15 miles of trails, live animals indoor and outdoor, treehouse, formerly the Chattanooga Arboretum & Nature Center
Steele Creek Park	Bristol	Sullivan	East Tennessee	website, over 2,200 acres (890 hectares), operated by the City, includes a nature center, golf course, 54 acre lake, 21 miles of trails
Shelby Bottoms Nature Center	Nashville	Davidson	Middle Tennessee	website, 950 acres (380 hectares) acres of Shelby Bottoms Greenway and 336 acres (136 hectares) acres of adjacent Shelby Park, operated by the City
Tims Ford State Park	Winchester	Franklin	Middle Tennessee	website 3,546 acres (1,435 hectares), with camping, cabins, and a visitor center
T. O. Fuller State Park	Memphis	Shelby	West Tennessee	1,138 acres (461 hectares) acres, seasonal nature center
Warner Park Nature Center	Nashville	Davidson	Middle Tennessee	2,684 acres (1,086 hectares), operated by the City

== Resources ==
- Environmental Education in Tennessee
