= Mollie Fontaine Taylor House =

Coordinates: 35.14433°N 90.0379°W

The Mollie Fontaine Taylor House is a historic Victorian architecture residence at 679 Adams Avenue converted into a bar a restaurant in the Victorian Village section of Memphis, Tennessee. Built c. 1886 it was a wedding present for a wealthy daughter of Nolan Fontaine. The father's home where she grew up, the Woodruff-Fontaine House, is across the street and is now a museum.
