= Memphis Museums of Science and History =

Group of museums in Memphis, Tennessee

- MoSH

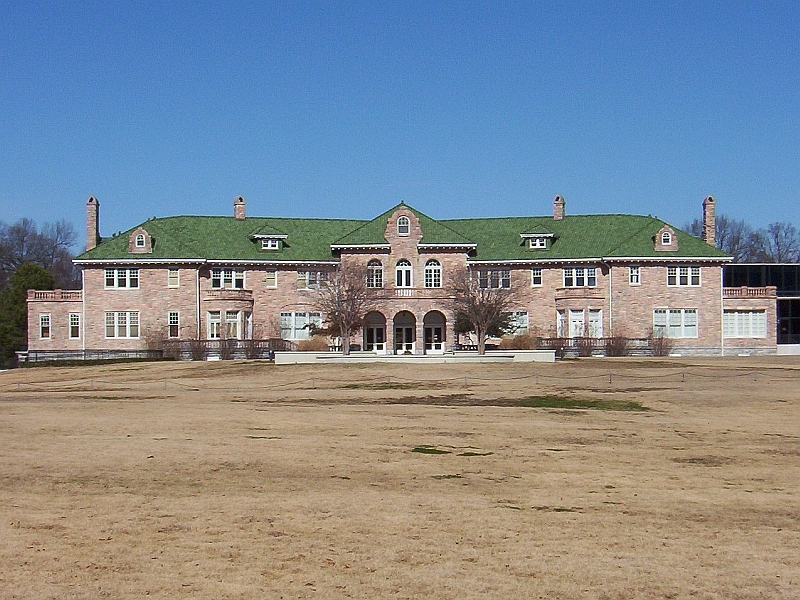
- Pink Palace in Memphis (2008)
- Former name: Memphis Museums System; Pink Palace Family of Museums
- Website: moshmemphis.com

The Memphis Museums of Science and History (MoSH) are a group of museums in Memphis, Tennessee maintained by the City of Memphis and Memphis Museums, Inc. They display collections of historical, educational and technological significance.

The following museums are part of the group:

- The Pink Palace Museum and Planetarium in Memphis.
- Coon Creek Science Center, the site of Upper Cretaceous fossil finds and a museum in Adamsville, Tennessee
- Lichterman Nature Center, an arboretum/nature center/wildlife museum in Memphis
- Mallory-Neely House, a historic home in the Victorian Village of Memphis
- Magevney House, a historic home in the Victorian Village of Memphis

The Pink Palace Museum and Planetarium houses a museum of local cultural and natural history, the Spotlight Giant Theater and the Sharpe Planetarium.

== History ==
The organization was founded to renovate the Pink Palace Museum in 1970s. The museum system was also involved in the planning for the Mississippi River Museum on Mud Island.

In 2000, the system changed its name to the Pink Palace Family of Museums. In 2021, all of the museums were rebranded as branches of the Memphis Museum of Science and History to emphasize the shared management. However, the museum branding was reverted in 2024, with MoSH organization being renamed to the Memphis Museums of Science and History.

== See also ==
- List of museums in Tennessee
