= Beale Street Baptist Church =

- First Baptist Church
- U.S. National Register of Historic Places
- U.S. National Historic Landmark District – Contributing property
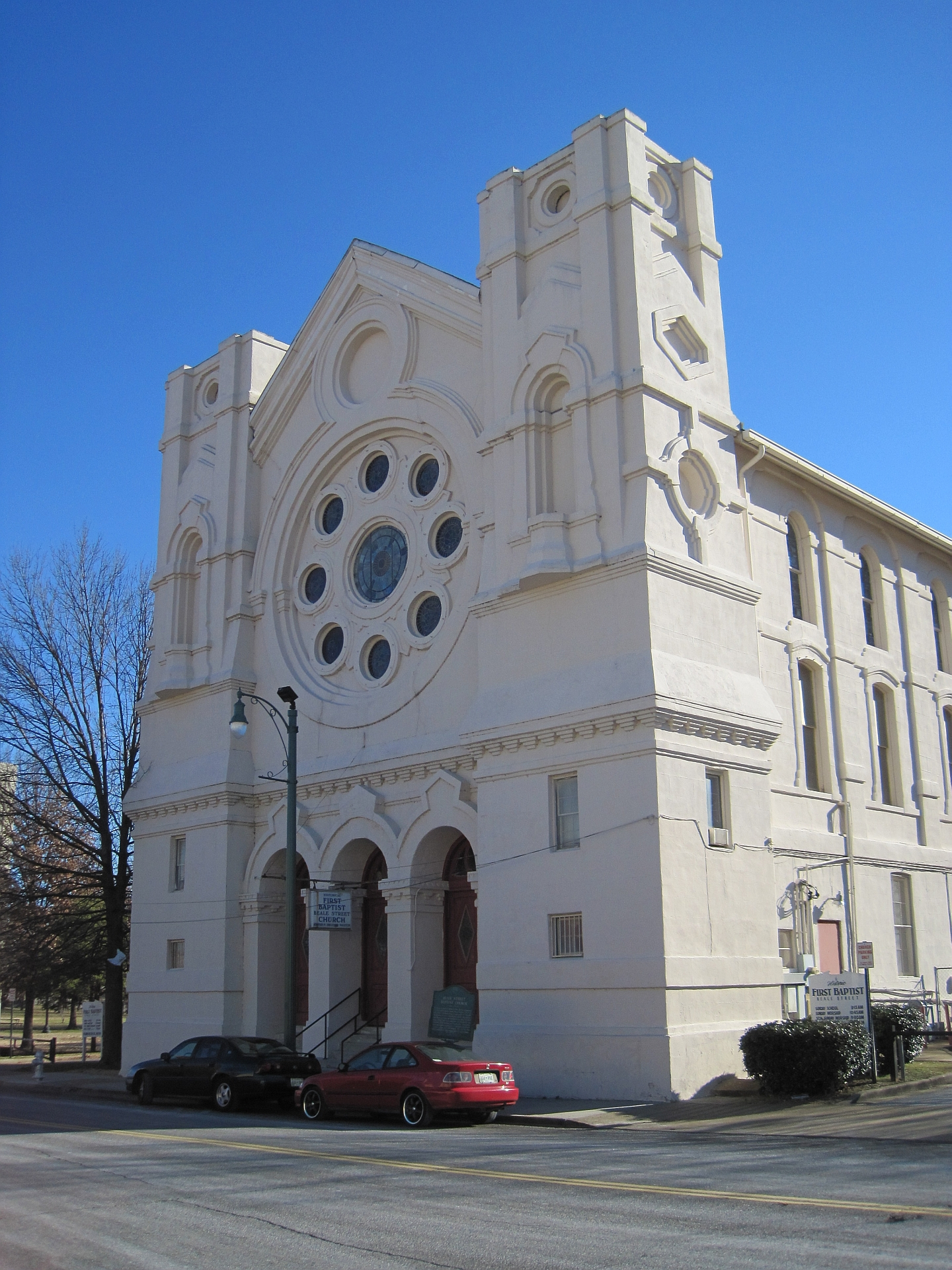
- Beale Street Baptist Church

- Location within Tennessee Location within the United States
- Location: 379 Beale Ave., Memphis, Tennessee
- Coordinates: 35°08′19″N 90°02′54″W
- Area: 1 acre (0.40 ha)
- Built: 1869
- Part of: Beale Street Historic District (ID92001581)
- NRHP reference No.: 71000833

Significant dates
- Added to NRHP: February 11, 1971
- Designated NHLDCP: July 29, 1993

Beale Street Baptist Church, also known as First Baptist Church or Beale Avenue Baptist Church, is a historic church on Beale Street, in Memphis, Tennessee. It is affiliated with the National Baptist Convention, USA.

It was founded by a congregation of freed slaves. It was designed by the prominent Memphis architectural firm Jones & Baldwin, a partnership between Edward Culliatt Jones and Matthias Baldwin. Its foundation stone was laid in 1869, and it was constructed between 1871 and 1885. In the late 1880s, the church also housed the newspaper office of Ida B. Wells, the famous civil rights journalist. Over the years, Ulysses S. Grant and Teddy Roosevelt made visits to the church.

The structure was added to the National Register of Historic Places in 1971, and was included in an enlargement of the National Historic Landmark District of Beale Street in 1993. Adjacent to the church, a plaza dedicated to Ida B. Wells was established in 2021.
