= John S. Toof House =

Historic house in Tennessee, United States

- U.S. National Register of Historic Places
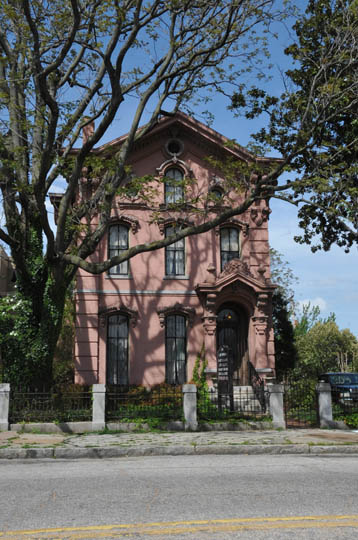
- The John S. Toof House in 2008

- Location within Tennessee Location within the United States
- Location: 246 Adams Ave., Memphis, Tennessee
- Coordinates: 35°8′49″N 90°2′48″W
- Area: less than one acre
- Built: 1875
- Architect: Matthias Harvey Baldwin
- Architectural style: Italianate
- NRHP reference No.: 82004058
- Added to NRHP: March 25, 1982

The John S. Toof House is a historic townhouse in Memphis, Tennessee, USA.

== History ==
The three-story townhouse was built for John S. Toof in 1875. It was designed by architect Matthias Harvey Baldwin in the Italianate style.

It has been listed on the National Register of Historic Places since March 25, 1982.
