= Reflection Riding Arboretum and Nature Center =

Botanical garden in Tennessee, US

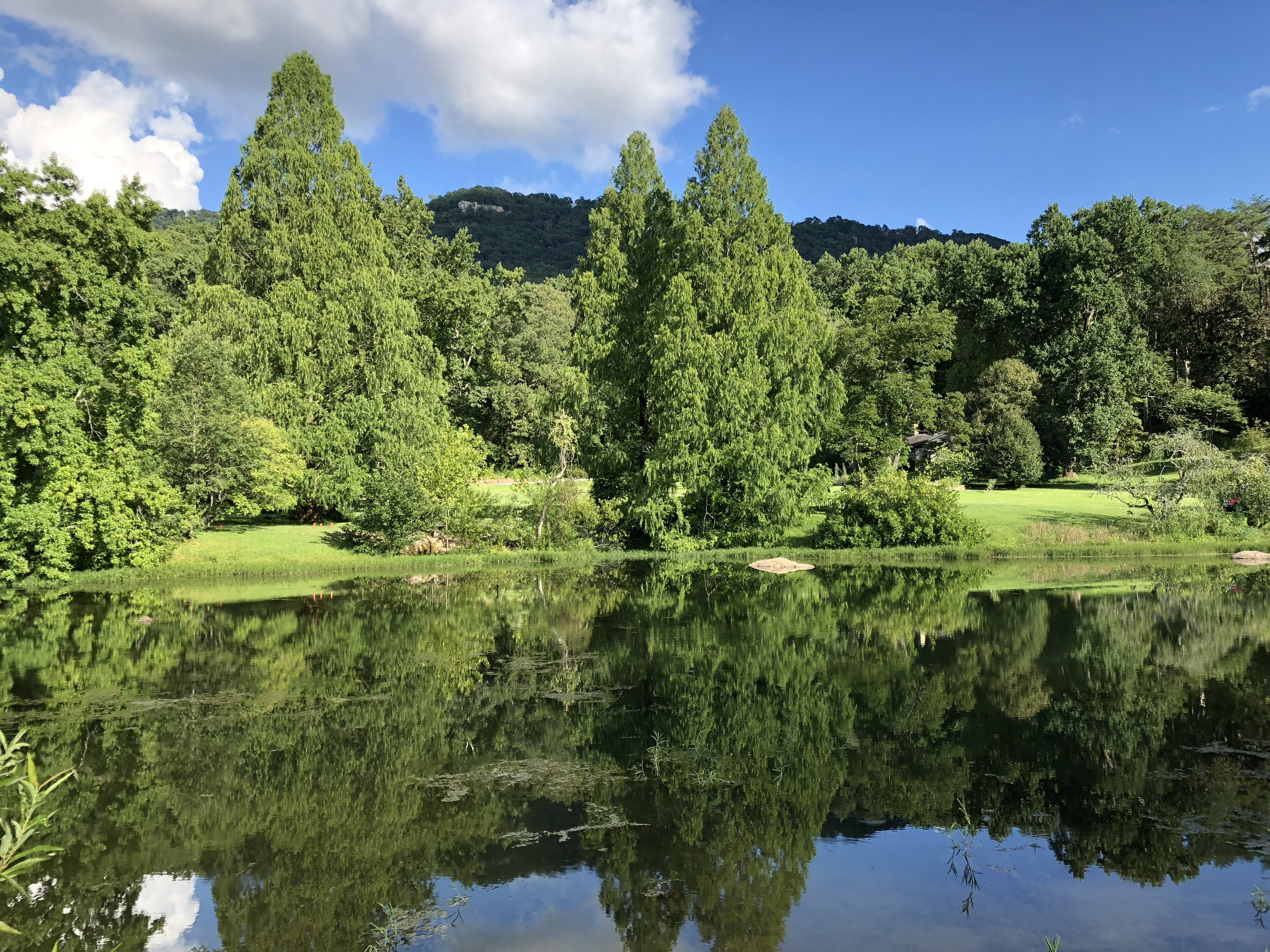
- The upper lake at Reflection Riding provides a reflected view of three dawn redwoods planted by the founders and the slopes of Lookout Mountain.
- Interactive map of Reflection Riding Arboretum and Nature Center
- Type: Arboretum, Botanical garden, Nature center
- Location: 400 Garden Road; Chattanooga, Tennessee, United States 37419
- Coordinates: 35°0′36.4″N 85°21′53.42″W
- Area: 317 acres (128 ha)
- Created: 1956
- Hiking trails: 15 miles
- Website: reflectionriding.org

Reflection Riding Arboretum and Nature Center (317 acres) is a nonprofit arboretum, botanical garden, nature center and historical site located at 400 Garden Road, Chattanooga, Tennessee.

The facility includes the 317-acre arboretum, 15 miles of trails, live animals indoor and outdoors, and a treehouse. The nature center participates in the endangered Red Wolf Species Survival Plan or SSP, breeding red wolves in captivity.

The riding contains over 1,000 species of flora, with over 150 tree species. It includes a driving loop (3 miles) through woodland gardens, wildflower meadows, ponds, and along the banks of Lookout Creek, as well as some 12 miles (19 km) of walking trails and paths.

== History ==
The riding was created by John and Margaret Chambliss, and incorporated in 1956 to a vision laid out in the 1940s. It is dedicated to the study and conservation of native plant life.

In 2011, the formerly separate Reflection Riding Arboretum and the Chattanooga Nature Center combined boards and management. The new organization was originally called the Chattanooga Arboretum and Nature Center.

In October 2017 the nonprofit hired RootsRated co-founder Mark McKnight as president. In March, 2018 they announced the creation of a new Forest Kindergarten and Forest School.

== Conservation ==
The organization has been a member of the red wolf species survival plan and captive breeding program since 1996 and has been an advocate for the program through educational outreach and programming.

== See also ==
- List of botanical gardens in the United States
- List of nature centers in Tennessee
- List of nature centers
