= Magevney House =

Historic house in Tennessee, United States

- U.S. National Register of Historic Places
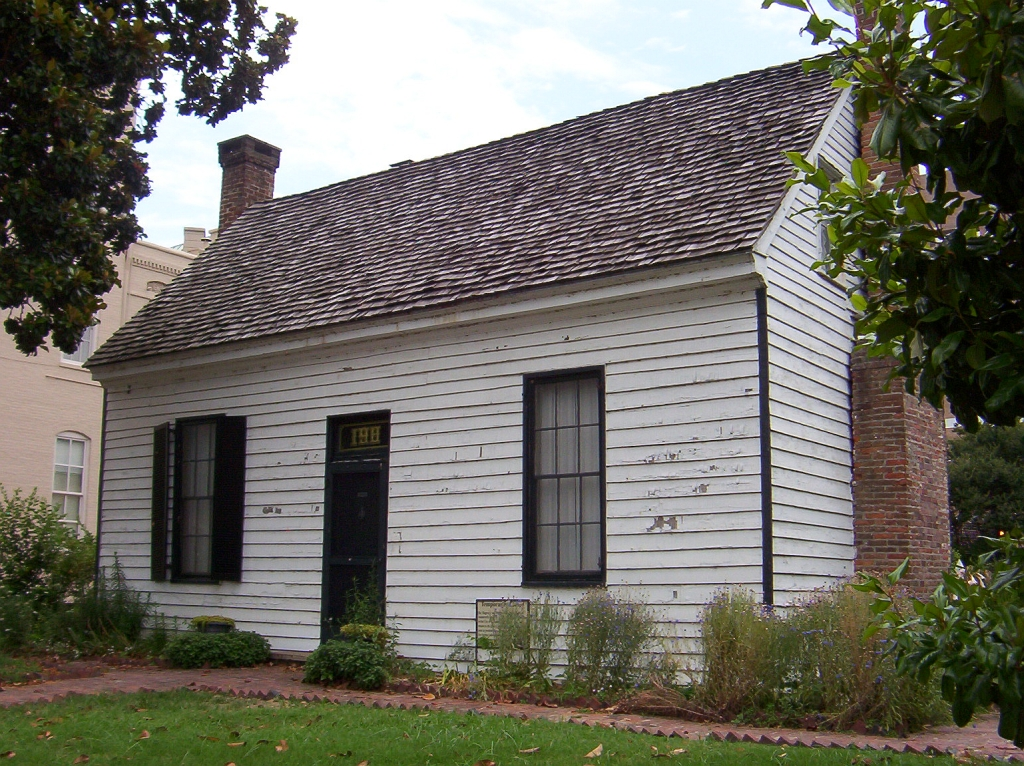

- Location within Tennessee Location within the United States
- Location: 198 Adams Ave., Memphis, Tennessee
- Coordinates: 35.14730°N 90.04836°W
- Area: 1 acre (0.40 ha)
- Built: 1836
- NRHP reference No.: 73001831
- Added to NRHP: November 6, 1973

The Magevney House is a historic residence on 198 Adams Avenue in Memphis, Tennessee, USA. It is located in the Victorian Village of Memphis and is listed on the National Register of Historic Places. It is one of the oldest residences remaining in Memphis.

== History ==
In the 1830s, the Magevney House was built by Eugene Magevney as a clapboard cottage. Magevney was born in Ireland in 1798 to a Catholic family. He immigrated to the United States in 1828 and settled in Memphis in 1833, where he was a pioneer teacher and civic leader. He died in the yellow fever epidemic of 1873.

During the late 1830s and early 1840s, three important events in Memphis religious history took place in the cottage. In 1839, the first Catholic mass in Memphis was celebrated in the house. In 1840, a priest officiated at the first Catholic marriage in the city. In 1841, the first Catholic baptism of Memphis was performed at the Magevney homestead.

In 1941, the descendants of Eugene Magevney gave the property to the City of Memphis, which adapted and operated it as a house museum. In 1973, the Magevney House was listed in the National Register of Historic Places.

From 2005 to 2009, the house and museum were closed to the public. The Pink Palace in Memphis reopened the Magevney house, available to the public on the first Saturday of each month from 1pm-4pm. Admission is free. The Magevney House is part of the Pink Palace Family of Museums.

== See also ==
- National Register of Historic Places listings in Tennessee
- List of museums in Tennessee
