= Climate change in Tennessee =

Climate trends and environmental impacts in the U.S. state of Tennessee

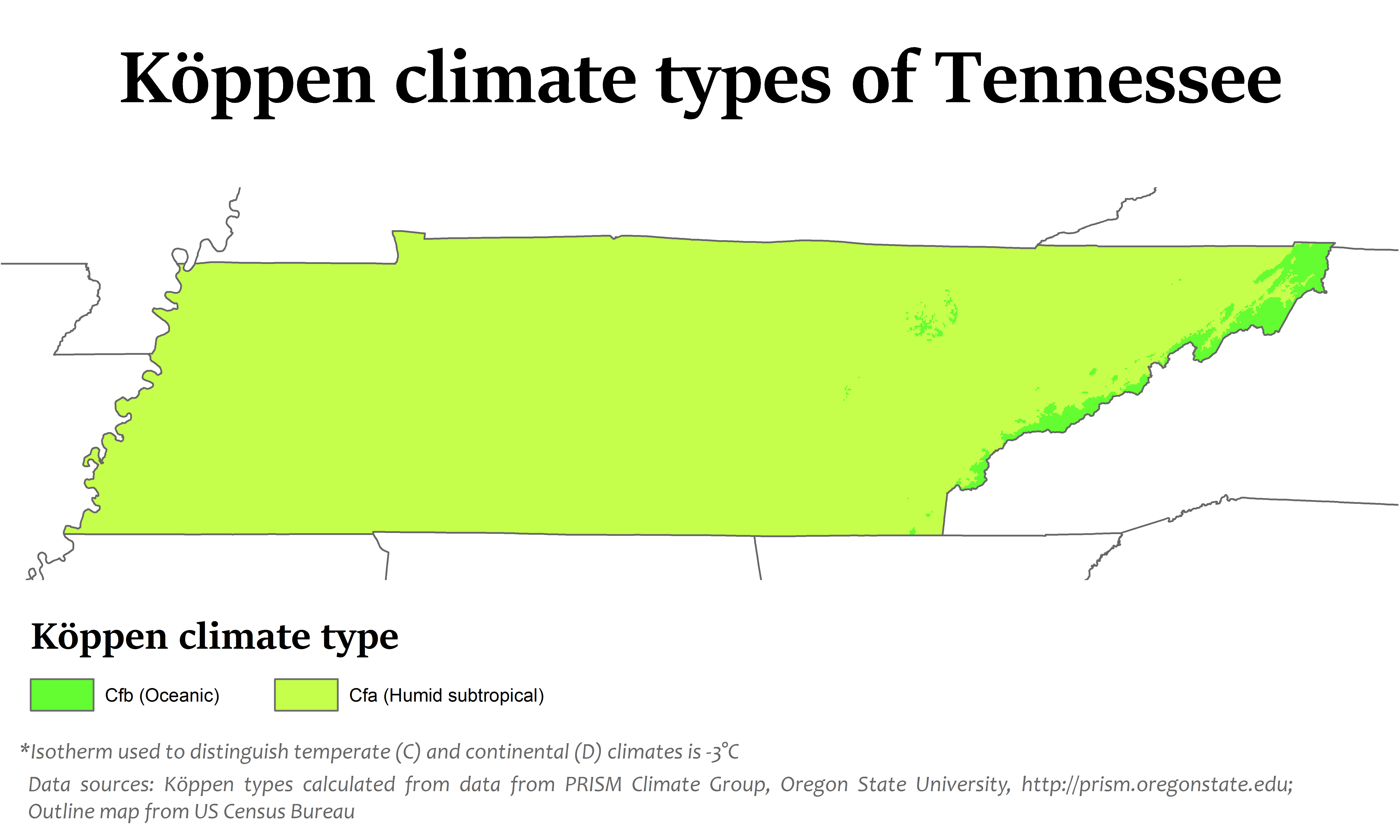
Köppen climate types in Tennessee, showing that most of the state has a humid subtropical climate.

Climate change in Tennessee encompasses the effects of climate change, observed and projected changes in temperature, precipitation, extreme weather, and ecological impacts in the U.S. state of Tennessee, as documented by federal and state scientific agencies.

It has been observed that Tennessee's climate has warmed slightly in recent decades, and precipitation patterns have shifted, with an increase in heavy rainfall events.

== Global warming in Tennessee ==
Global warming in the United States has been a salient topic since the Kyoto Protocol, as part of the United Nations Framework Convention on Climate Change, that was established in 1992. The effects of global warming have been widely debated; however, there is evidence that suggests a slight increase in the core temperature of most states. In addition, there seems to be a number of effects on ecological systems throughout the United States. In Tennessee, one key effect is the radical changes to the geological composition and wildlife health of the Ohio-Tennessee Basin.

== Temperature and precipitation trends ==
Nashville reached 100°F a total of 242 times between 1874–2026

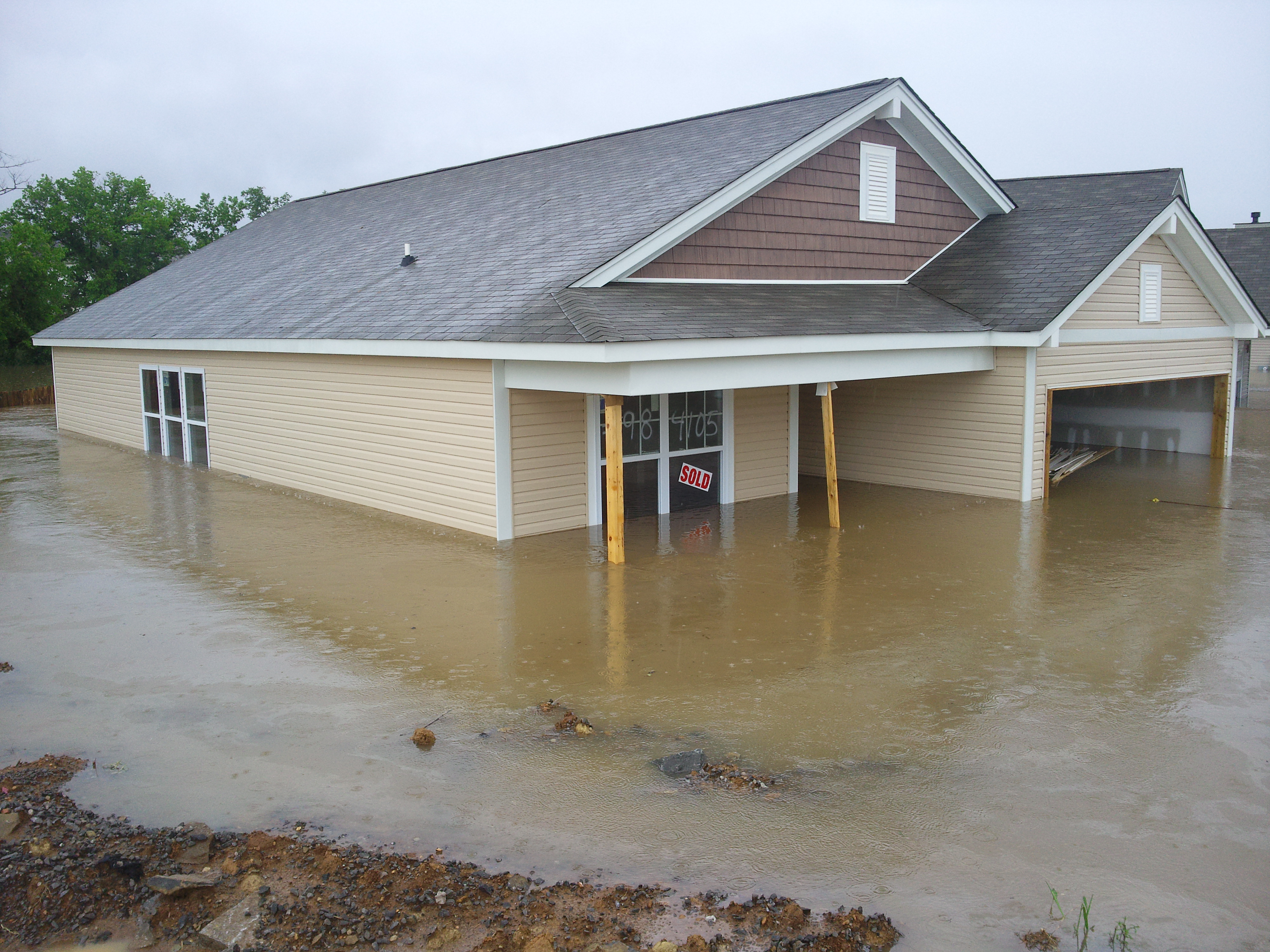
Flooded house in Nashville, 2010

Records analyzed by the National Oceanic and Atmospheric Administration (NOAA) indicate that average annual temperatures in Tennessee have varied over time, with a general warming trend observed in recent decades.

Precipitation has also increased compared to early 20th-century averages, with a greater share of rainfall occurring during heavy precipitation events.

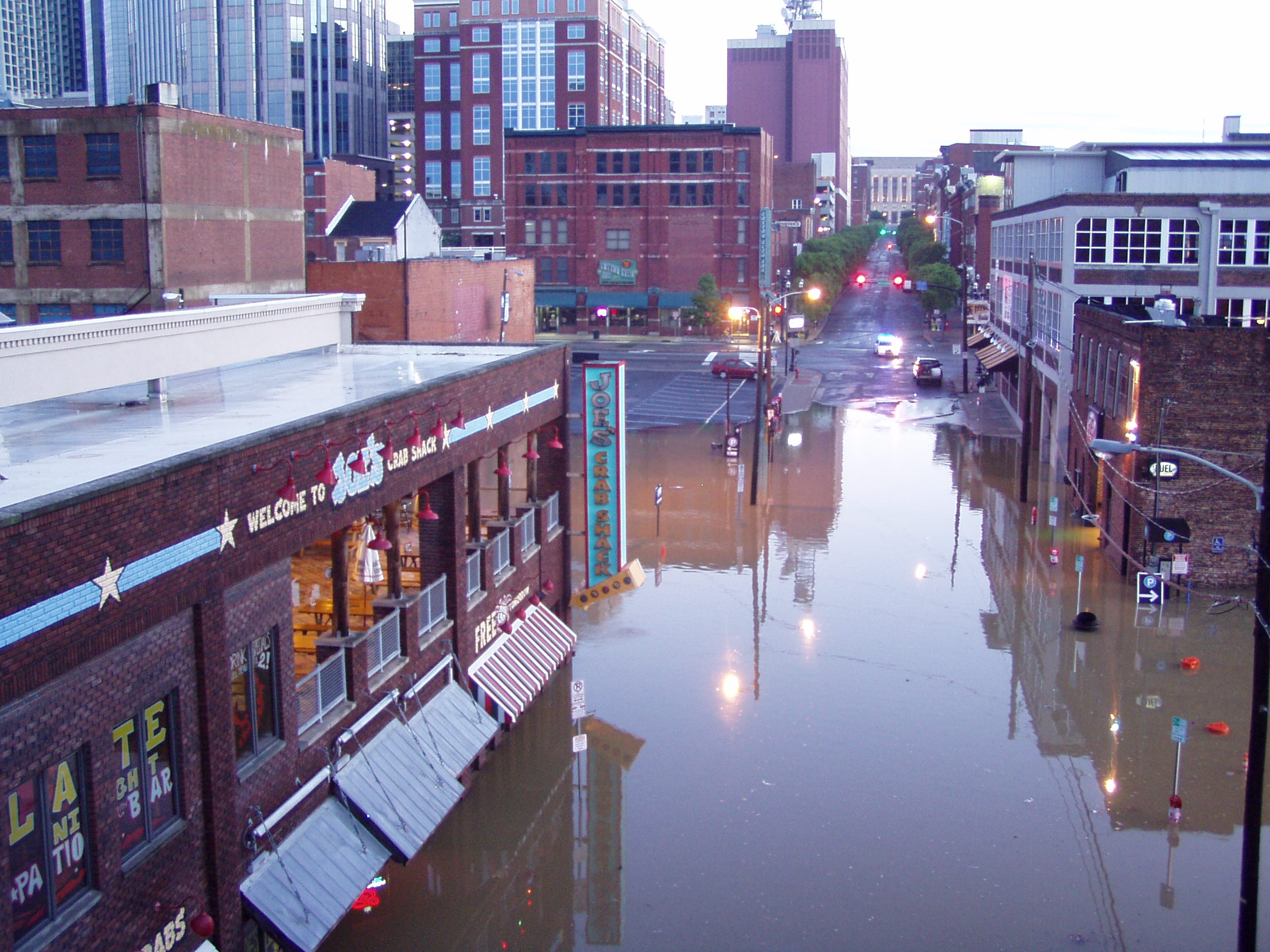
Downtown Nashville flooded, 2010

The southeastern United States has experienced an increase in heavy rainfall events since the mid-20th century. In Tennessee, major flood events have included the 2010 Tennessee floods and the 2021 Tennessee floods, both of which caused fatalities and extensive property damage.

Flood management relies heavily on reservoir systems operated by the Tennessee Valley Authority (TVA) and the United States Army Corps of Engineers. These systems reduce, but cannot eliminate, flood risk during extreme rainfall.

Some historical and ecological studies note that the Ohio-Tennessee Basin has experienced changes including nutrient enrichment, altered watershed characteristics, and increased pollutant concentrations.

Some changes to the Ohio-Tennessee Basin include:

- Over-enrichment of nutrients in the basin
- Decrease in watershed surface area
- Increased pollutant concentration of water

In 2016, the United States Environmental Protection Agency (EPA) reported: "Tennessee's climate is changing. Although the average temperature did not change much during the 20th century, the state has warmed in the last 20 years. Average annual rainfall is increasing, and a rising percentage of that rain is falling on the four wettest days of the year. In the coming decades, the changing climate is likely to reduce crop yields, threaten some aquatic ecosystems, and increase some risks to human health. Floods may be more frequent, and droughts may be longer, which would increase the difficulty of meeting the competing demands for water in the Tennessee and Cumberland rivers."

== Tornadoes ==
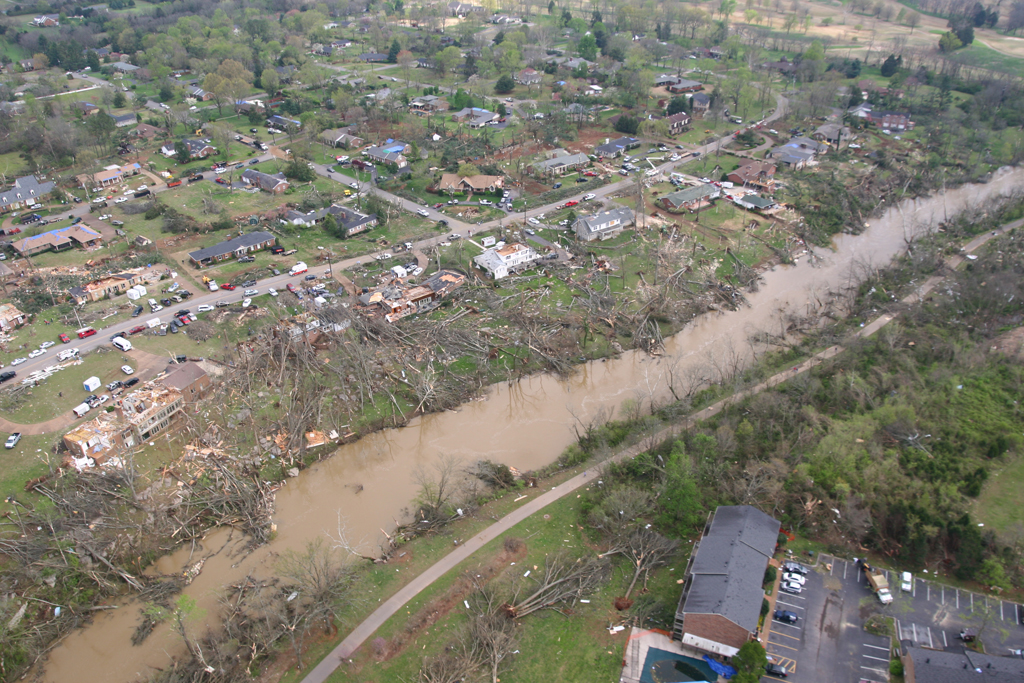
Tornado damage in Murfreesboro, Tennessee, 2009

Tennessee is vulnerable to tornadoes and other severe convective storms, particularly during spring. While historically on the edge of "Tornado Alley," the region has seen a shift in tornado frequency toward the southeastern United States, including more frequent events in West and Middle Tennessee.

In May 2019, The Kansas City Star noted that although it was not yet possible to say whether climate change was contributing to the increasing number of tornadoes in the region, "the band of states in the central United States ... that each spring are ravaged by hundreds of tornadoes — is not disappearing. But it seems to be expanding", resulting in a higher frequency of tornadoes in states including Tennessee.

Tornadoes are often accompanied by damaging straight-line winds, hail, and heavy rainfall.

== Winter climate ==
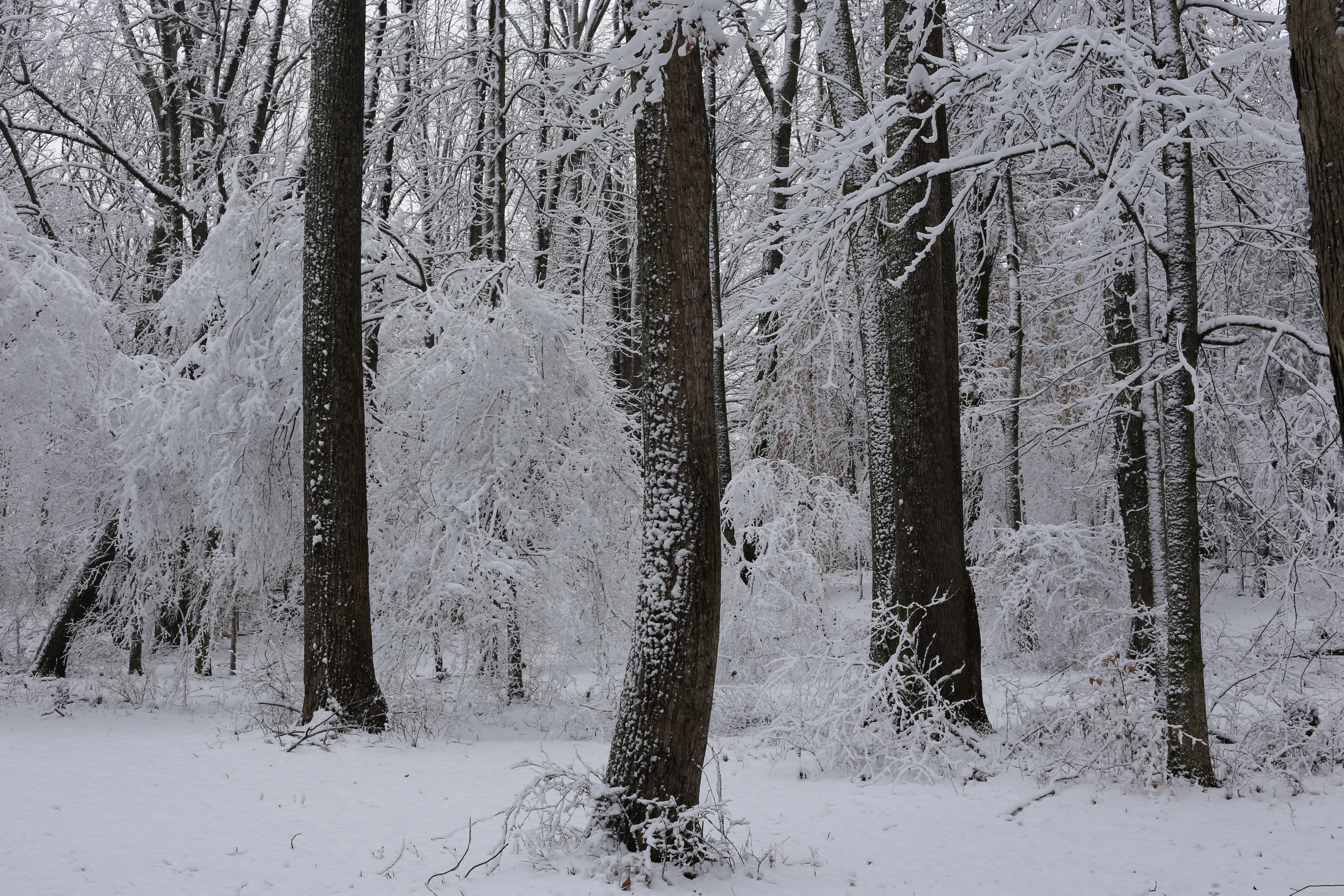
Snowfall in Coffee County, 2022

Winters in Tennessee are increasingly variable, with sharp shifts between mild periods and intense cold events. Long-term data from NOAA indicate that average winter temperatures have increased about 2.0°F since the mid-20th century, though specific winter events can be severe and unpredictable.

=== Extreme variability and weather whiplash ===
Recent winters have alternated between unusually warm periods and sudden cold outbreaks:

- In 2023, Nashville experienced its third-warmest winter on record, with January and February averaging 7–8°F above normal, interrupted by Arctic air outbreaks.
- Scientists attribute these sudden cold events to disruptions of the polar vortex caused by Arctic amplification, which allows frigid air to reach Tennessee more frequently.

=== Snowfall and ice hazards ===
A warmer atmosphere can hold more moisture, increasing the intensity of single winter storms and ice events:

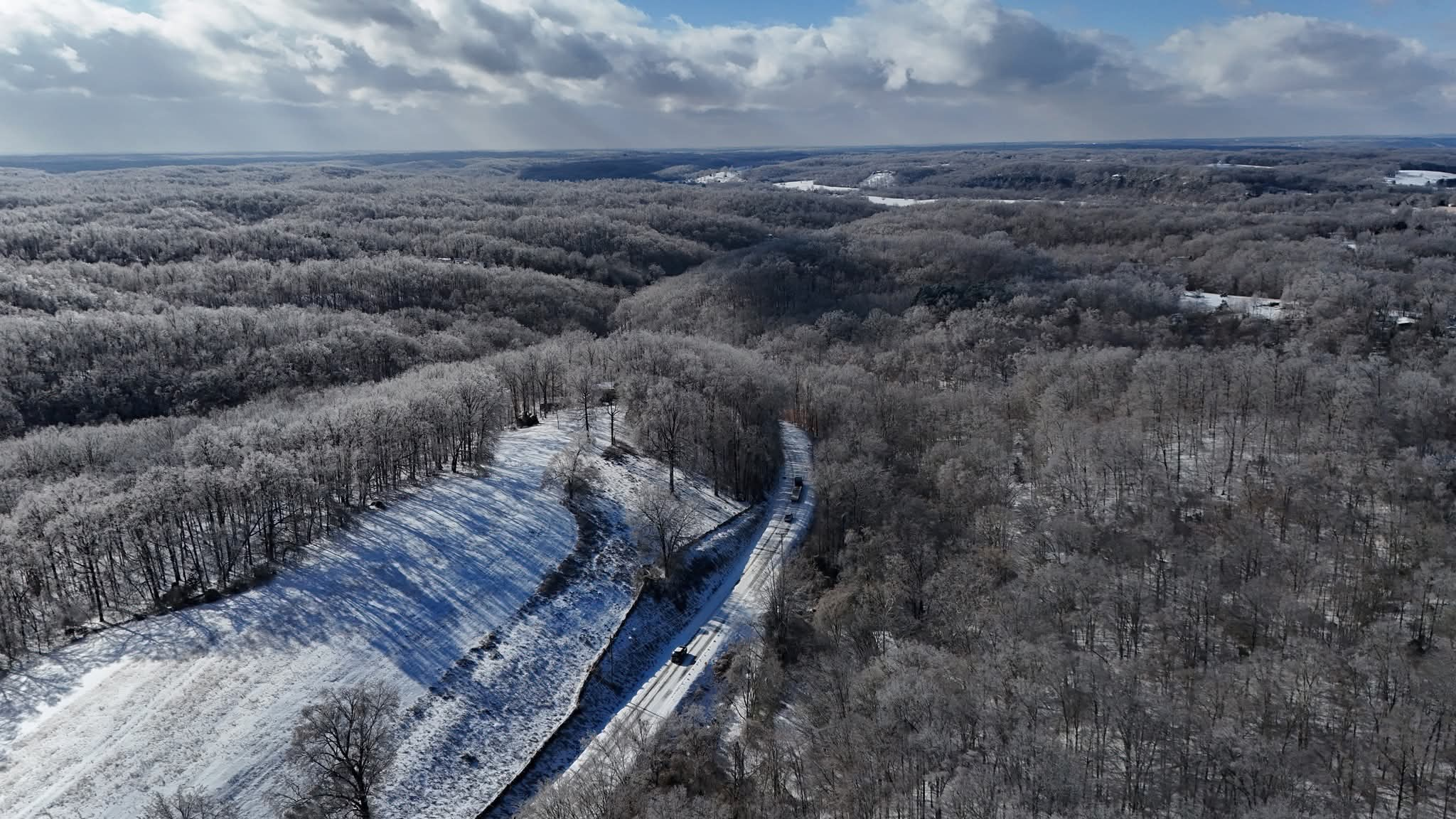
Iced-over hills in Cheatham County, 2026

- Above-average snowfall: Even as total snow days decrease, individual storms can drop heavy accumulations over 24–48 hours, overwhelming infrastructure.
- Ice and freezing rain: Tennessee lies in a narrow transition zone where slight temperature changes determine precipitation type. Mixed-phase events and freezing rain have become more frequent, causing power outages and hazardous travel, especially in Middle and West Tennessee.
- Hazardous impacts: Tennessee has recorded 15 major winter storm disasters, with a marked increase in frequency from 2020–2026.

== Drought and water resources ==
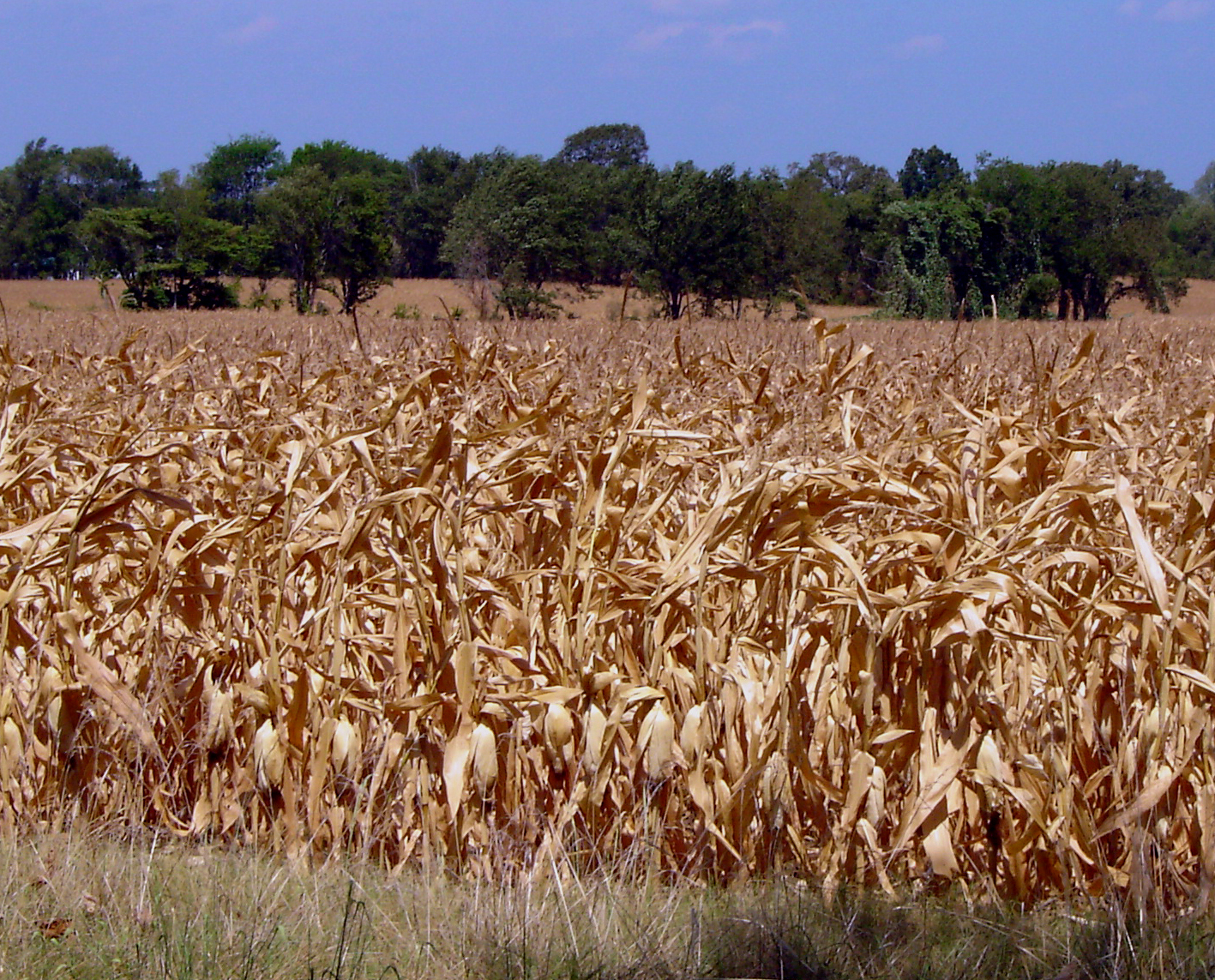
Dead cornfield in drought, West Tennessee.

Tennessee periodically experiences drought, which affects agriculture, river navigation, recreation, and hydroelectric power generation. TVA and the Army Corps may release stored water to maintain navigation channels on the Tennessee and Cumberland rivers.

Reduced streamflow can lower hydroelectric output at TVA dams, requiring greater reliance on other energy sources during dry periods.

Droughts affect water management, river navigation, and hydroelectric generation. During the 2007 drought, TVA hydroelectric production decreased by 30%, forcing reliance on more expensive fuels.

== Agriculture ==
Agriculture in Tennessee is influenced by seasonal weather patterns, including heat waves, heavy rainfall, and drought. According to the U.S. Department of Agriculture, longer growing seasons may benefit some crops, while heat stress, water shortages, and extreme events can reduce yields.

Livestock operations may be affected by high summer temperatures, which can reduce productivity and increase water demand.

== Energy and legislation ==
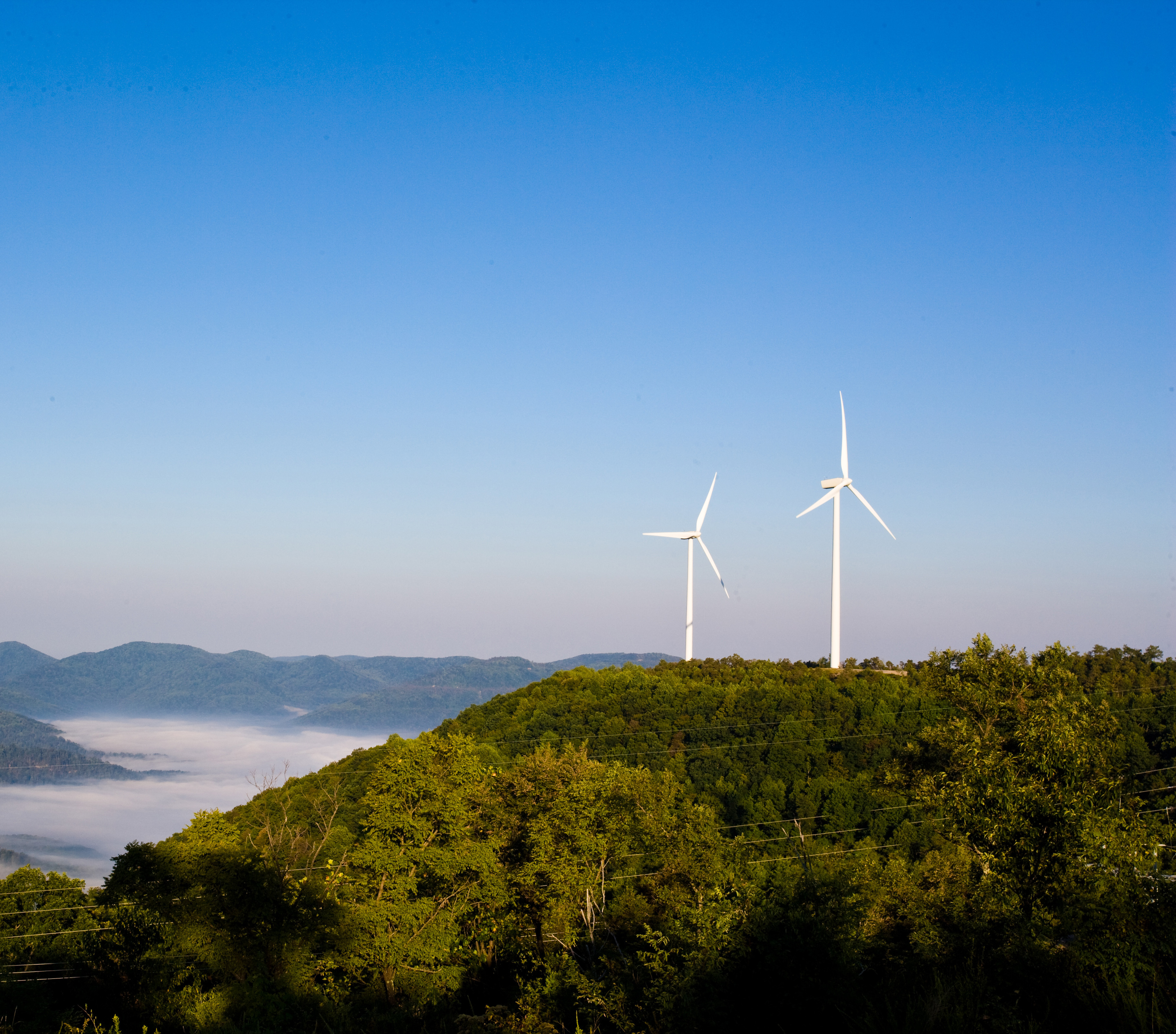
TVA wind turbines, Buffalo Mountain

Executive Order 54 established the Energy Policy Task Force to create a new state energy plan by December 1, 2008.

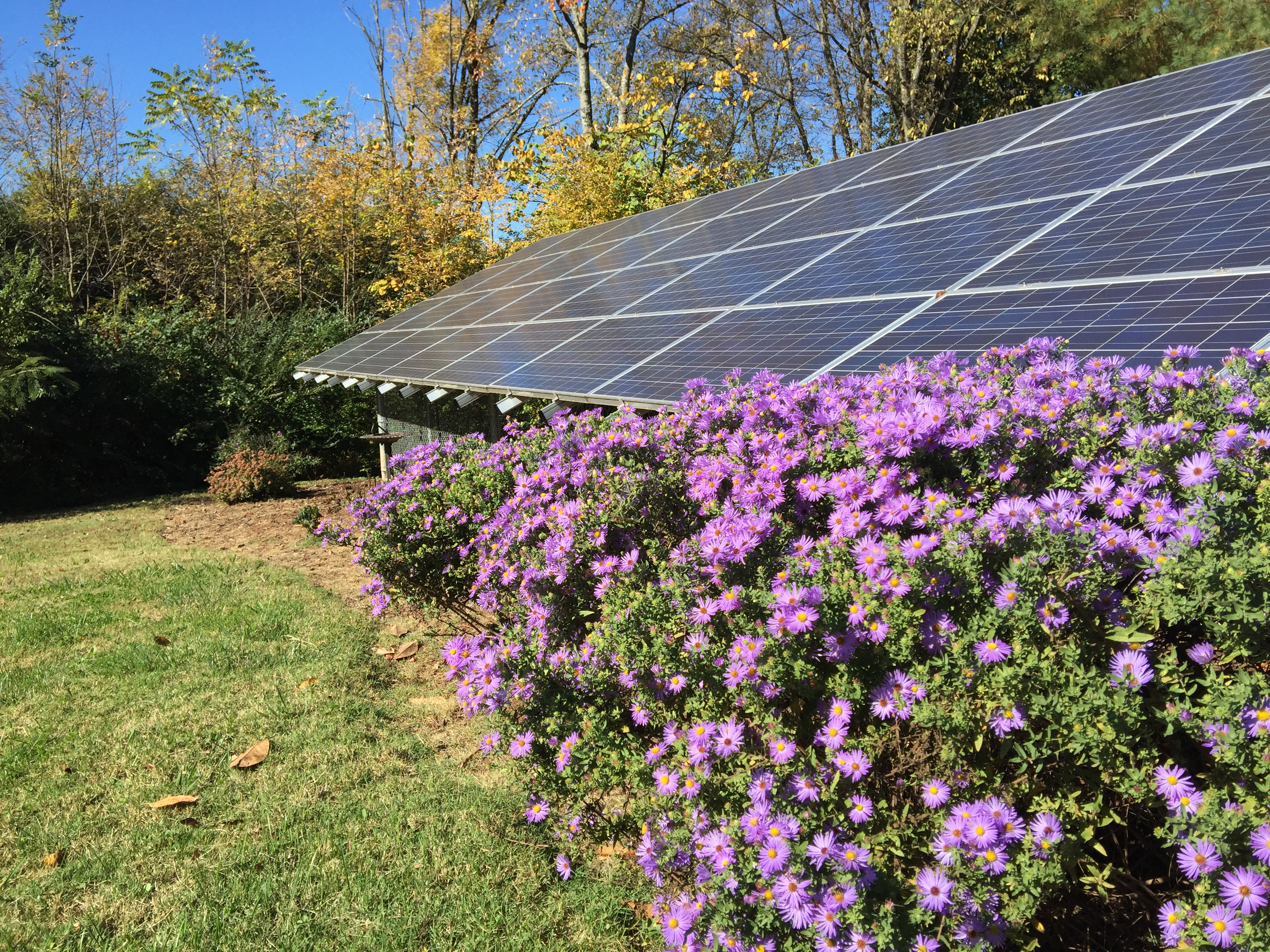
Solar installation, Knoxville

Executive Order 33 established the Interagency Alternative Fuels Working Group to position Tennessee as a leader in biofuels production.

Public Chapter 489 (2007) requires agencies and educational institutions to reduce petroleum use in state fleets by 20% by 2008.

== Forests and ecosystems ==
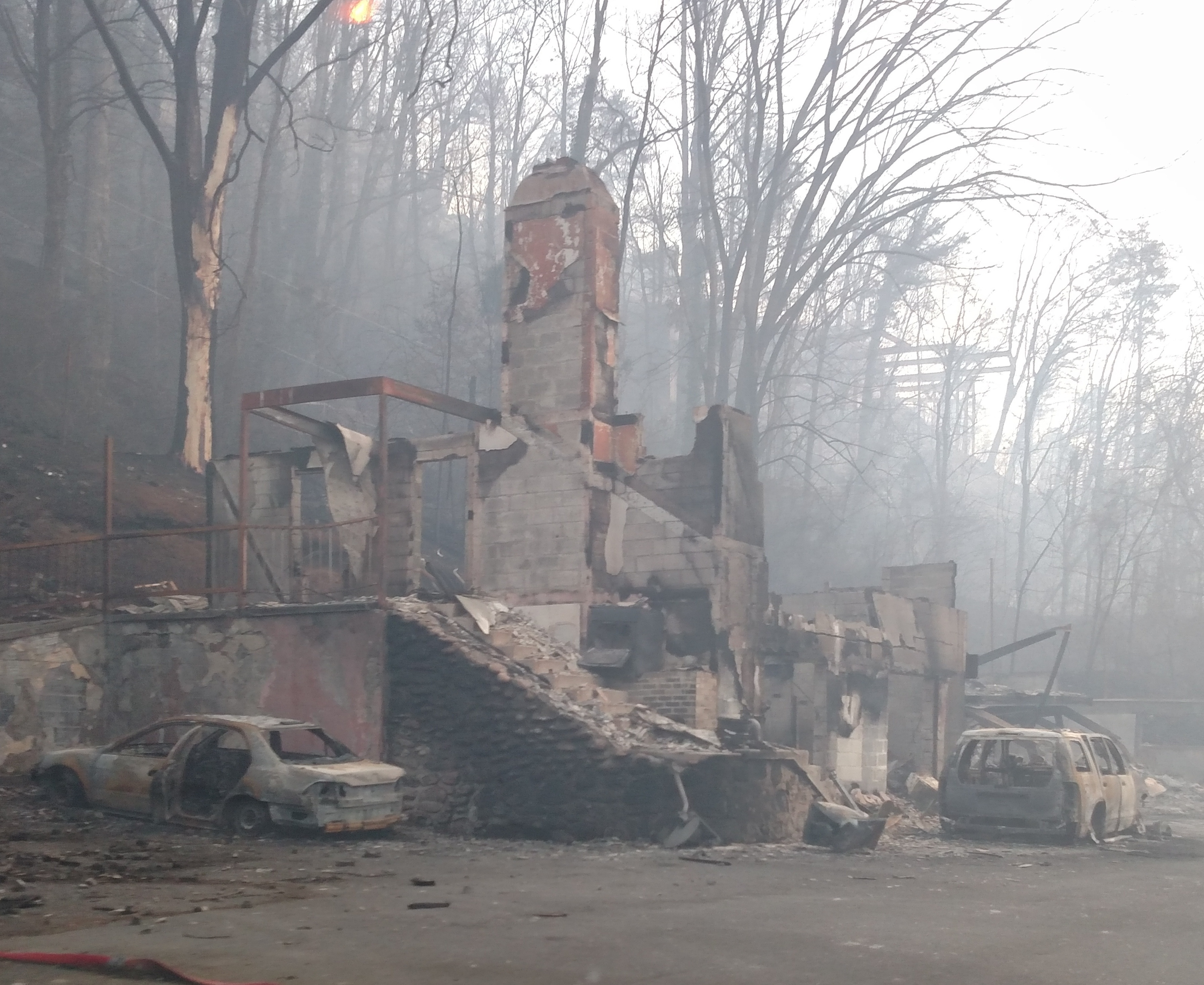
Building burned down by wildfires, Gatlinburg, Tennessee, November 2016.

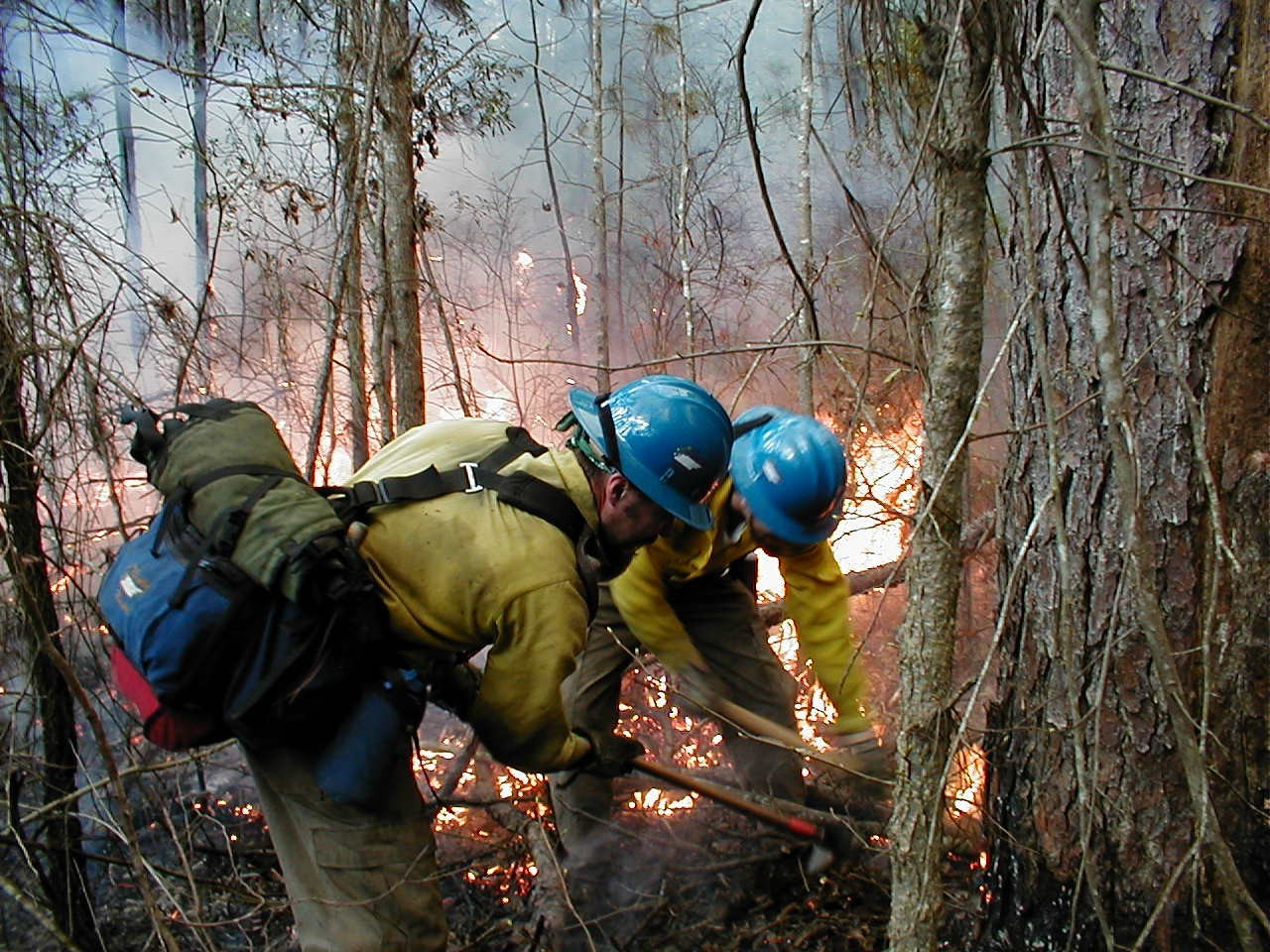
Wildfire crew, Cherokee National Forest

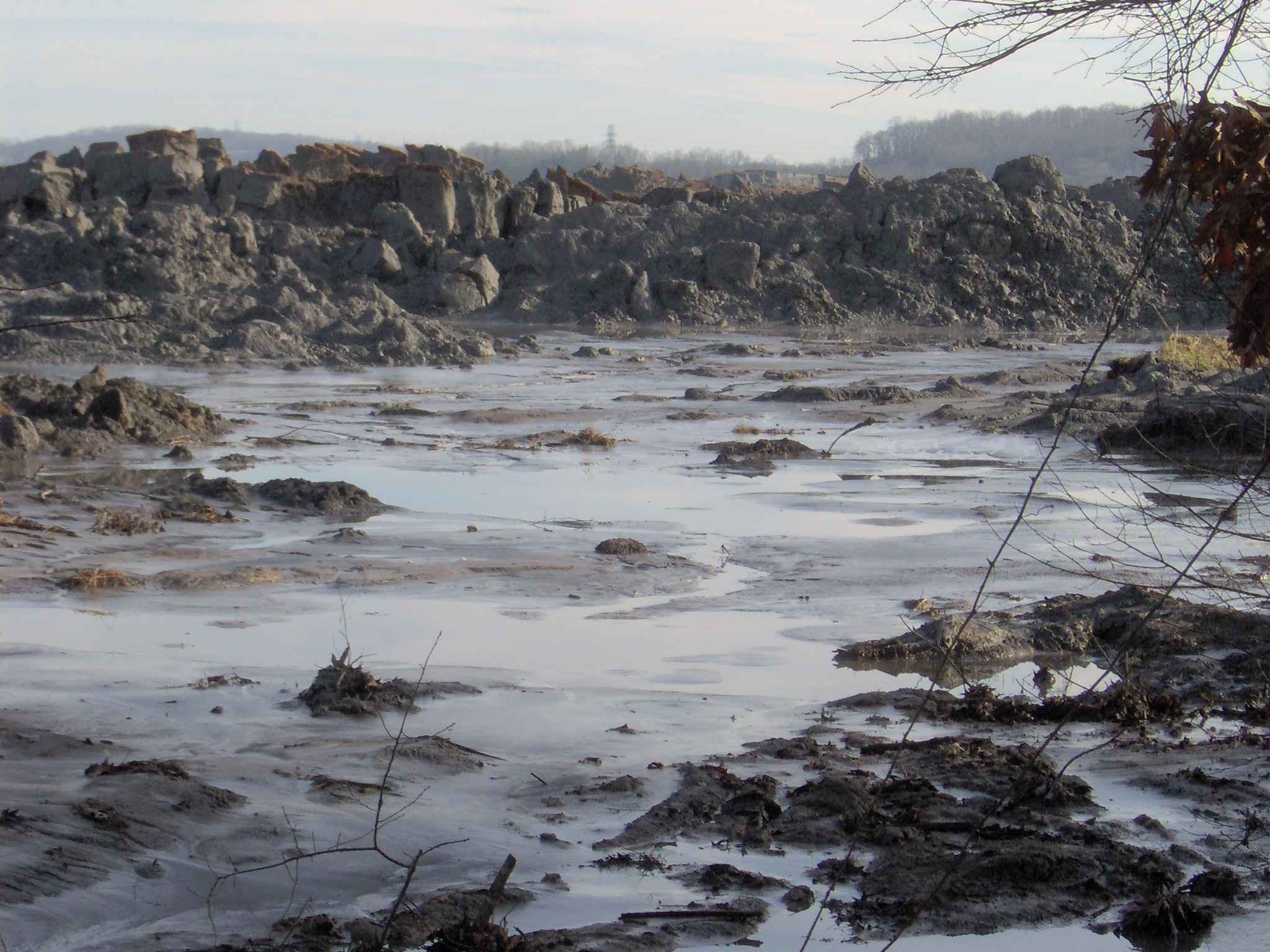
Spill of toxic coal ash at Kingston Fossil Plant, 2008.

Forests cover roughly half of Tennessee’s land and support a large forest products industry. Research suggests that tree species composition may shift over time in response to temperature, moisture conditions, pests, and wildfire patterns.

Forest modeling of the Ohio-Tennessee Basin shows that forest composition and biomass may change over time, with some regions projected to experience reduced diversity in dominant tree species.

The 2016 wildfires in the Great Smoky Mountains region highlighted the role of drought, fuel buildup, and weather conditions in wildfire risk.

One hypothesis for effects of climate change on Tennessee forest is that the high diversity of dominant life forms in Tennessee forests conveys resilience to disturbance such as climate change. To assess this effect, three climate change scenarios for 2030 and 2080 from three General Circulation Models (GCMs) simulated a range of potential climate conditions for the state. These climate changes derive from the Intergovernmental Panel on Climate Change (IPCC) “A1B” storyline that assumes rapid global economic growth. The precipitation and temperature projections from the three GCMs for 2030 and 2080 were related to changes in ecological provinces in Tennessee using the monthly record of temperature and precipitation from 1980 to 1997 for each 1 km cell across the state as aggregated into the provinces.

Temperatures are projected to increase in all ecological provinces in all months for all three GCMs for both 2030 and 2080. Precipitation differences from the long-term average are more complex but less striking. The forest ecosystem model LINKAGES was used to simulate conditions for five ecological provinces from 1989 to 2300. Average output projects changes in tree diversity and species composition in all ecological provinces in

== See also ==
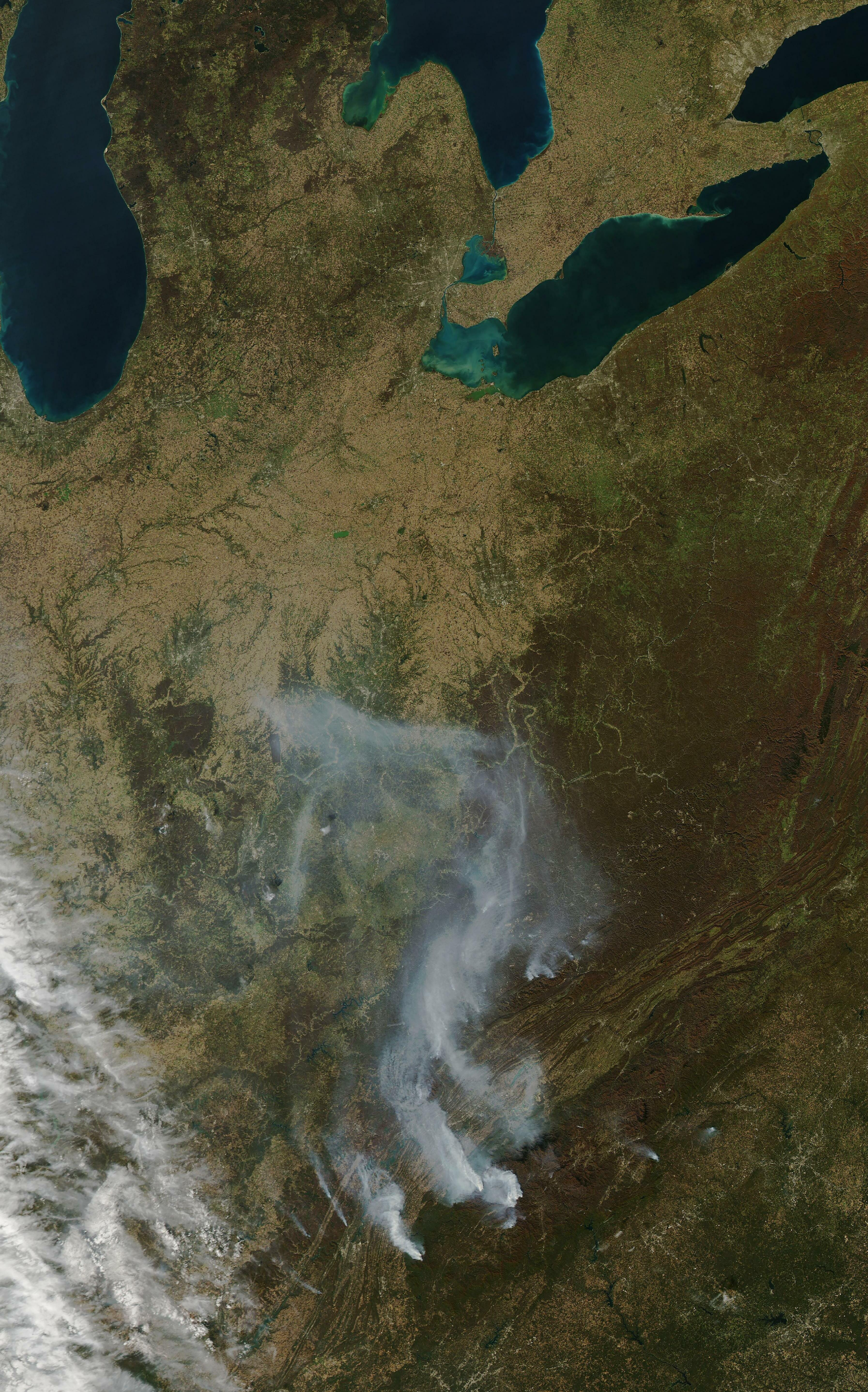
Smoke pollution from the 2016 wildfires viewed from space.

- List of U.S. states and territories by carbon dioxide emissions
- Plug-in electric vehicles in Tennessee
- Environment of Tennessee
