= List of historical societies in Tennessee =

The following is a list of historical societies in the state of Tennessee, United States.

== Organizations ==
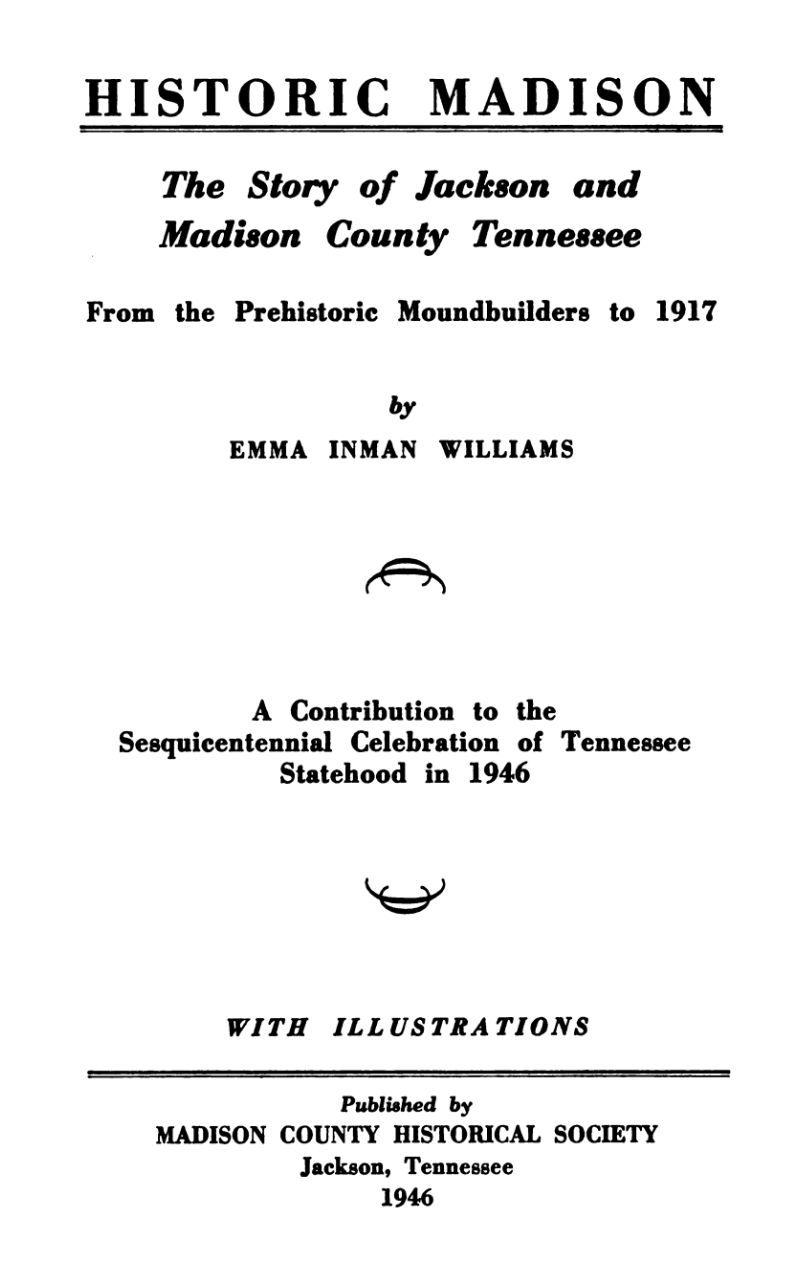
Title page of Historic Madison, published in 1946 by the Madison County Historical Society, Tennessee

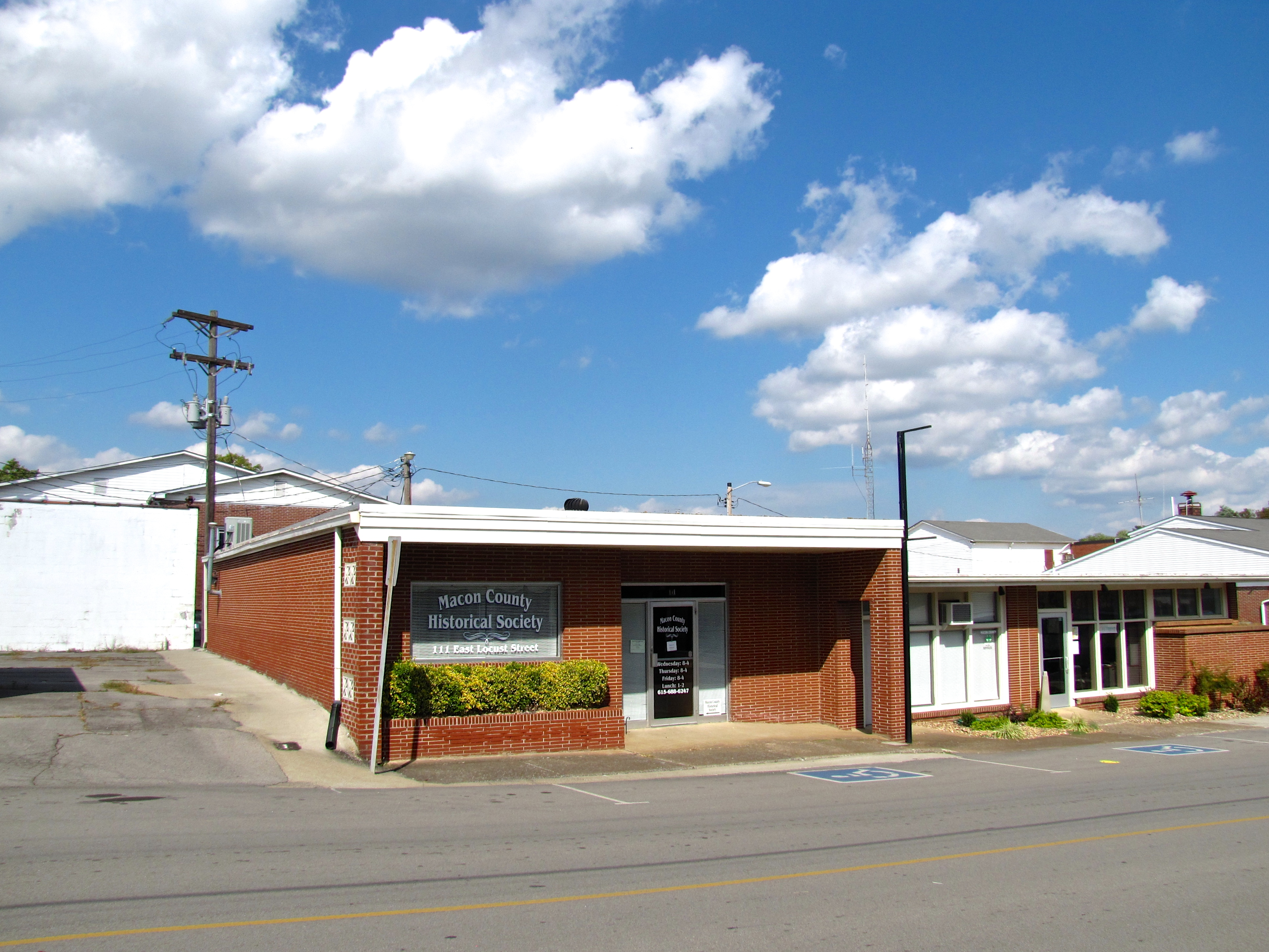
Macon County Historical Society building in Tennessee, US, in 2016

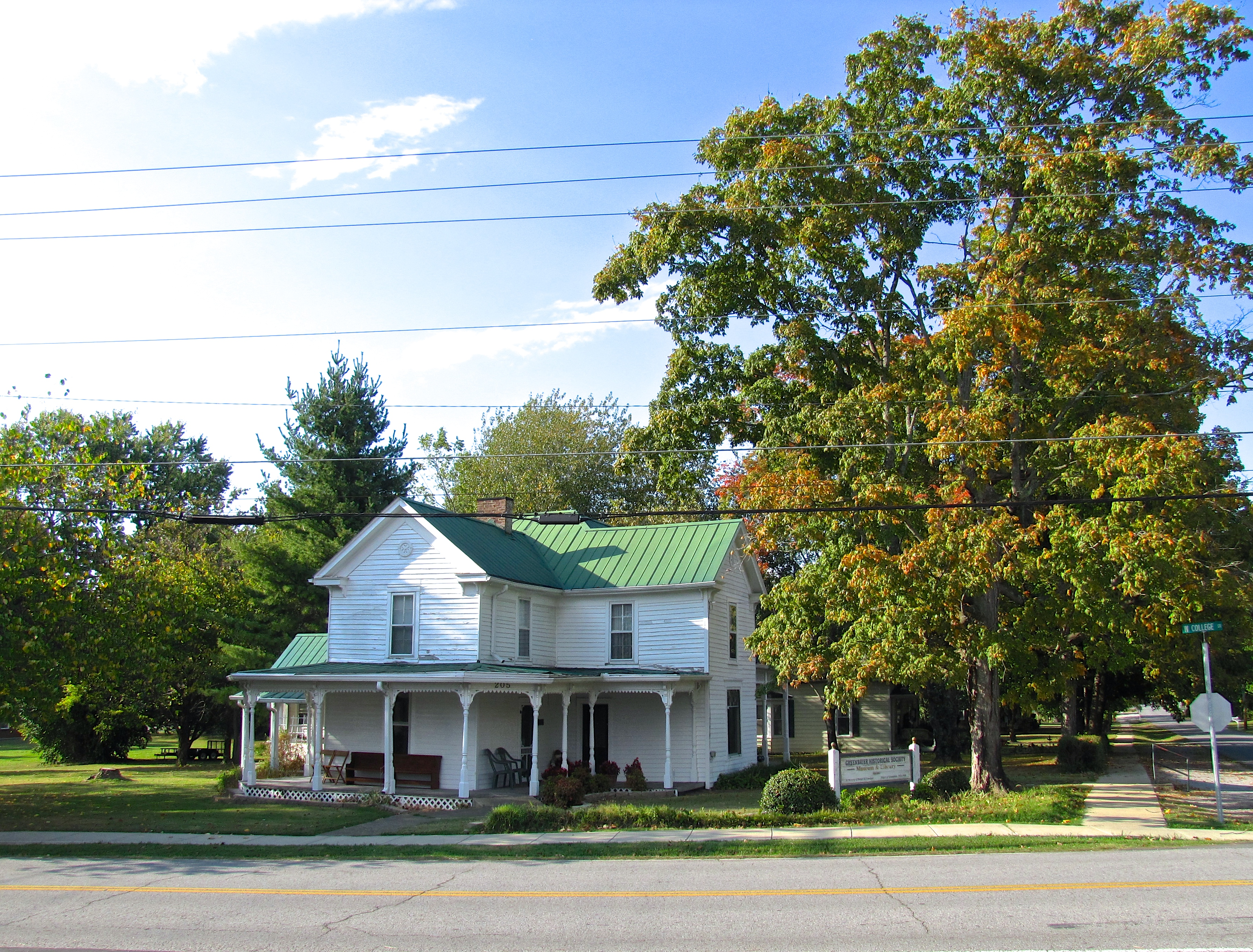
Museum and library building of the Greenbrier Historical Society, Tennessee (photo 2016)

- Anderson County Historical Society
- Association for the Preservation of Tennessee Antiquities
- Association for Tennessee History
- Beersheba Springs Historical Society
- Bledsoe's Lick Historical Association
- Chattanooga Area Historical Association
- Claiborne County Historical Society
- Dyer County Historical Society
- East Tennessee Historical Society
- Fentress County Historical Society
- Franklin County Tennessee Historical Society
- Giles County Historical Society
- Grainger County Historic Society
- Greenback Historical Society
- Greenbrier Historical Society
- Grundy County Historical Society
- Hartsville-Trousdale County Historical Society
- Jackson Purchase Historical Society
- Jefferson County Historical Society
- Lewis County Historical Society
- Historical Society of Loudon County
- Macon County Historical Society
- Madison County Historical Society
- Maury County Historical Society
- McMinn County Historical Society
- Meigs County Historical Society
- Monroe County Historical Society
- Montgomery County Historical Society
- Morgan County Historical Society
- Oliver Springs Historical Society
- Overton County Historical Society
- Polk County Historical and Genealogical Society
- Rhea County Historical Society
- Scott County Historical Society
- Sequatchie Valley Historical Association
- Smoky Mountain Historical Society
- Sullivan County Historical and Genealogical Society
- Historical Society of Tennessee
- Tennessee Historical Society
- Union County Historical Society
- Vanderbilt Southern Historical Society
- Washington County Historical Association
- West Tennessee Historical Society

== See also ==
- History of Tennessee
- List of museums in Tennessee
- National Register of Historic Places listings in Tennessee
- List of historical societies in the United States
