= James Lee House (690 Adams Avenue, Memphis) =

Historic house in Tennessee, United States

- Lee and Fontaine Houses of the James Lee Memorial
- U.S. National Register of Historic Places
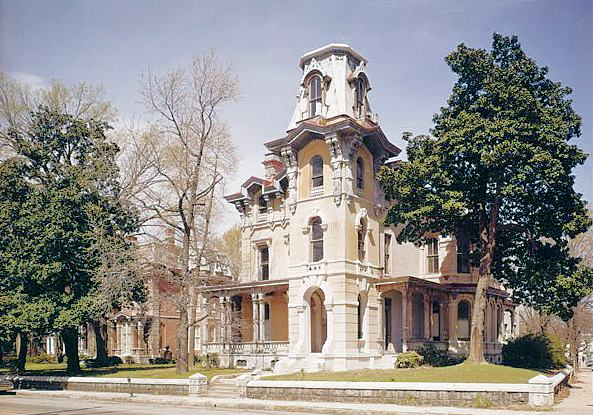

- Location within Tennessee Location within the United States
- Location: 680-690 Adams Ave., Memphis, Tennessee
- Coordinates: 35°8′38″N 90°2′7″W
- Area: 5 acres (2.0 ha)
- Architectural style: Late Victorian, Second Empire
- NRHP reference No.: 71000835
- Added to NRHP: February 11, 1971

The James Lee House, also known as the Harsson-Goyer-Lee House, is a historic house at 690 Adams Avenue in Memphis, Tennessee, United States. It is listed on the National Register of Historic Places, together with the adjacent Woodruff-Fontaine House. The two houses are included in the Victorian Village historic district.

The 8,100-square-foot home was constructed by William Harsson in 1848. Harsson's daughter, Laura, married Charles Wesley Goyer, who bought the house in 1852. Goyer had it expanded by the architecture firm of Edward Culliatt Jones and Matthias H. Baldwin in 1871, after seeing their work in designing the neighboring Woodruff-Fontaine House.

James Lee, a riverboat captain who had been educated at Princeton University, bought the house in 1890. In 1925 it became the James Lee Memorial Art Academy, a predecessor of the Memphis College of Art (formerly the Memphis Academy of Art). The city of Memphis took ownership in 1929. After the art school moved to a new location in 1959, the house was vacant for many years. It was used by Canadian indie rock group Tokyo Police Club in a music video for their 2008 song "In a Cave."

In 2012 the empty house was purchased by new private owners. The following year, a $2 million construction and renovation project began, converting the house into a luxury bed and breakfast. The city of Memphis provided a property tax abatement to encourage its renovation. The bed and breakfast opened for business in April 2014.
