= Lichterman Nature Center =

Arboretum and nature center in East Memphis, Tennessee, US

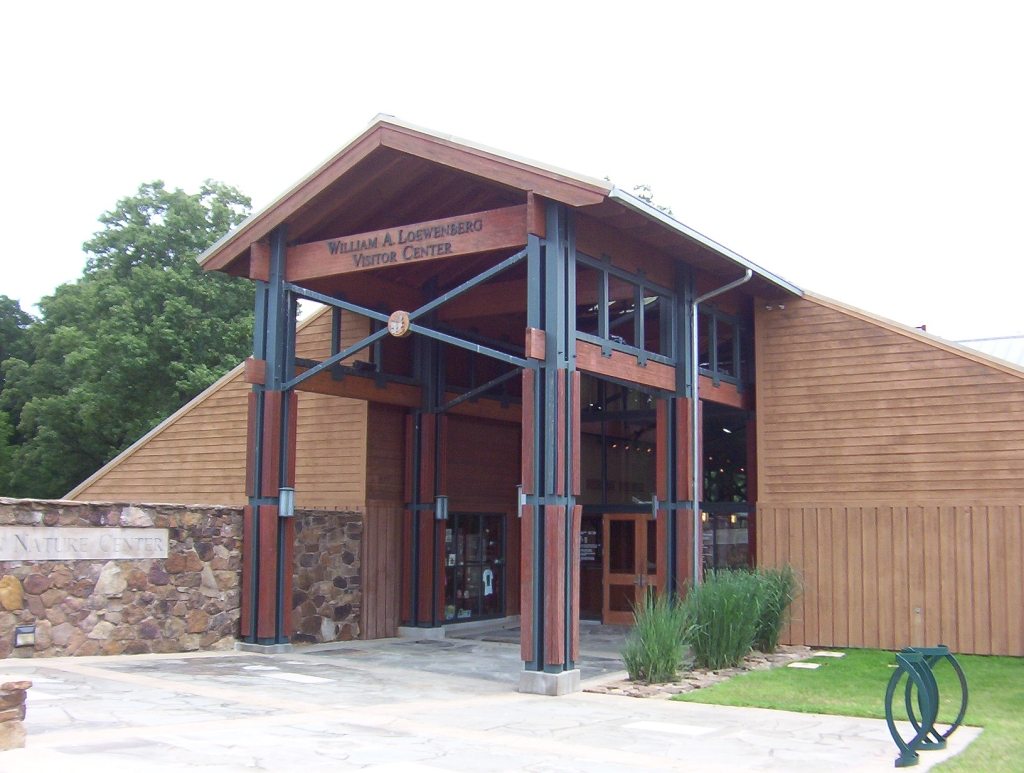
- Visitors center and nature museum at the Lichterman Nature Center
- Interactive map of Lichterman Nature Center
- Type: Arboretum, nature center
- Location: 5992 Quince Road; Memphis, Tennessee, USA
- Coordinates: 35°05′27″N 89°51′53″W
- Area: 65 acres (26 ha)
- Created: April 16, 1983
- Operator: Pink Palace Family of Museums
- Hiking trails: 3 miles
- Website: www.memphismuseums.org/lichterman-overview/

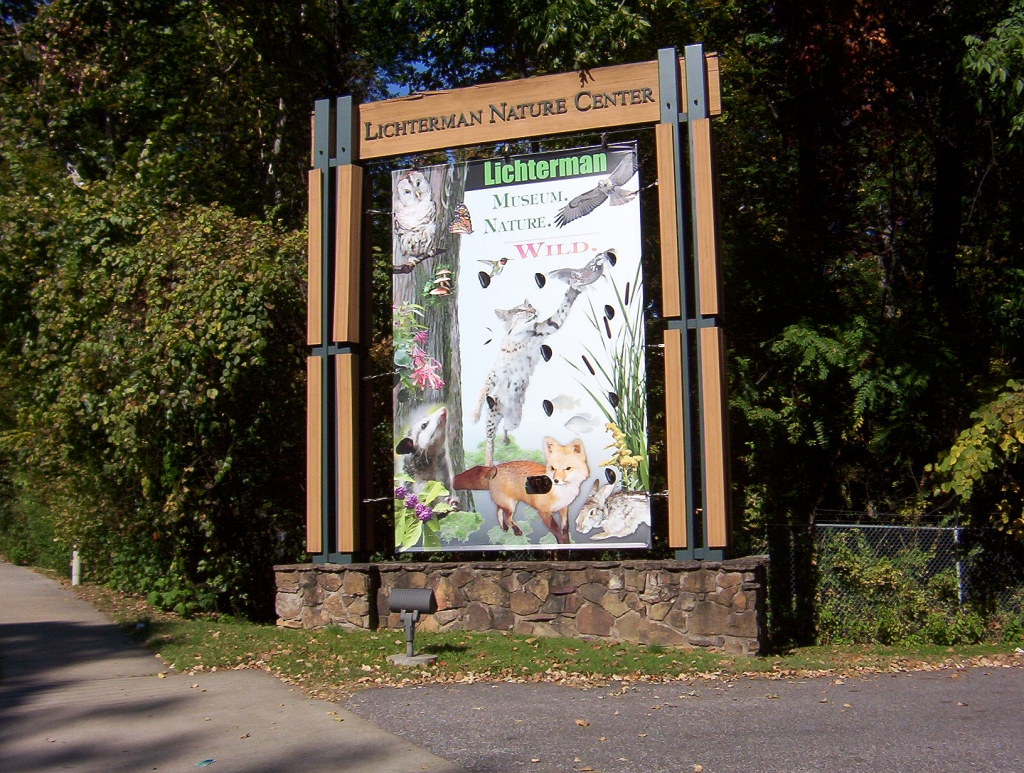
Entrance sign

Lichterman Nature Center is a certified arboretum and nature center located in East Memphis, Tennessee. It has many outdoor and indoor animal exhibits, as well as several activities and events. The Lichterman Nature Center is one of the facilities within the Pink Palace Family of Museums.

== History ==
The center opened on April 16, 1983.

== Introduction ==
Among the attractions are the Visitor Center which showcases interactive exhibits; preserved specimen animal exhibits with hands on petting patches of fur of the featured animals; a lake cam; and the Nature Store offering nature oriented educational materials, gifts, books, and toys. The Backyard Wildlife Center provides a variety of living and interactive exhibits about the three distinct habitats represented at the Nature Center: lake, meadow, and forest.

The 65-acre (260,000 m^{2}) wildlife observation area includes a three-mile (5 km) nature path which is home to a wide variety of native plants, birds, reptiles, amphibians, and mammals. The Nature Center no longer accepts wounded or abandoned wild animals and no longer has veterinarian staff on site.

== Events ==
Also included on the property is a special events pavilion providing a sheltered place for meetings, family reunions, receptions, and overnight youth programs. The amphitheatre features an intimate staging area for outdoor programs.

Throughout the year, Lichterman Nature Center hosts several events open to the public including plant sales; Earthfest; Discovery Days; Privet Pulls; and specialized programs for school age children as well as adults.

== See also ==
- List of nature centers in Tennessee
- List of museums in Tennessee
