= Mallory–Neely House =

Historic house in Tennessee, United States

- Mallory-Neely House
- U.S. Historic district – Contributing property
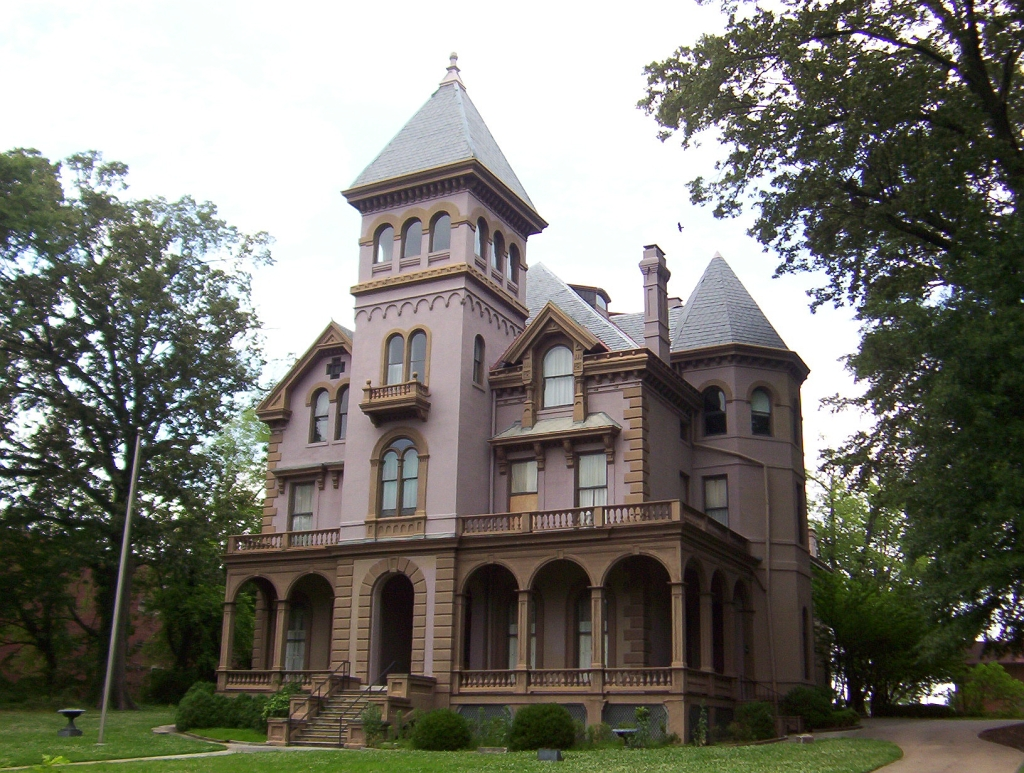

- Location within Tennessee Location within the United States
- Location: 652 Adams Ave., Memphis, Tennessee
- Coordinates: 35.14522°N 90.03849°W
- Built: ca. 1852
- Architectural style: Italianate villa-style
- Part of: Victorian Village District (ID72001253)
- Designated CP: December 11, 1972

The Mallory–Neely House is a historic residence on 652 Adams Avenue in Memphis, Tennessee, USA. It is located in the Victorian Village district of Memphis. It has been identified as one of numerous contributing properties in the historic district.

== History ==
Around 1852, the mansion was built in the Italianate style as an early Victorian villa. From 1852 until 1969, the mansion was home to the families of Isaac Kirtland, Benjamin Babb, James C. Neely, Daniel Grant, and Barton Lee Mallory.

In the 1880s and 1890s, the house was extensively renovated. During the renovation, the original two and one half stories of the building were extended to three full stories and the tower of the building was enlarged. After the renovation, the house consisted of 25 rooms. The Neely family decorated the mansion in the Victorian style, with parquet flooring, ornamental plasterwork, and ceiling stenciling.

In 1969, the last resident of the mansion, Daisy Neely-Mallory, died at age 98. According to her wish, the house was deeded to the Daughters, Sons, and Children of the American Revolution.

== Museum ==
In 1972, the Victorian Village district of Memphis was listed in the National Register of Historic Places. In 1973 the mansion was adapted for use as a house museum, featuring furnishings of the Victorian era. The museum is operated by the City of Memphis and Museums Inc. since 1987 and is part of the Pink Palace Family of Museums.

In 2005, the Mallory–Neely House was closed to the public due to the need for expensive renovations and funding problems of the City of Memphis. As of 2014 the house is open to the public. It was reopened in early November 2012 in a special ceremony for VIPs. It reopened to the general public a week later on November 11, 2012. The house has been stabilized and re-roofed with slate tiles and full copper trim. The house has had numerous additions to make it accessible under Americans with Disabilities Act of 1990 (ADA) rules. As of November 4, 2012, the public is admitted on Fridays and Saturdays. A ramp allows entry to the first floor. The carriage house serves as the ticket office, and is also the venue for a 20-minute video about the museum.

== See also ==
- National Register of Historic Places listings in Tennessee
- List of museums in Tennessee
