= Woodruff-Fontaine House =

Historic house in Tennessee, United States

- Lee and Fontaine Houses of the James Lee Memorial
- U.S. National Register of Historic Places
- U.S. Historic district – Contributing property
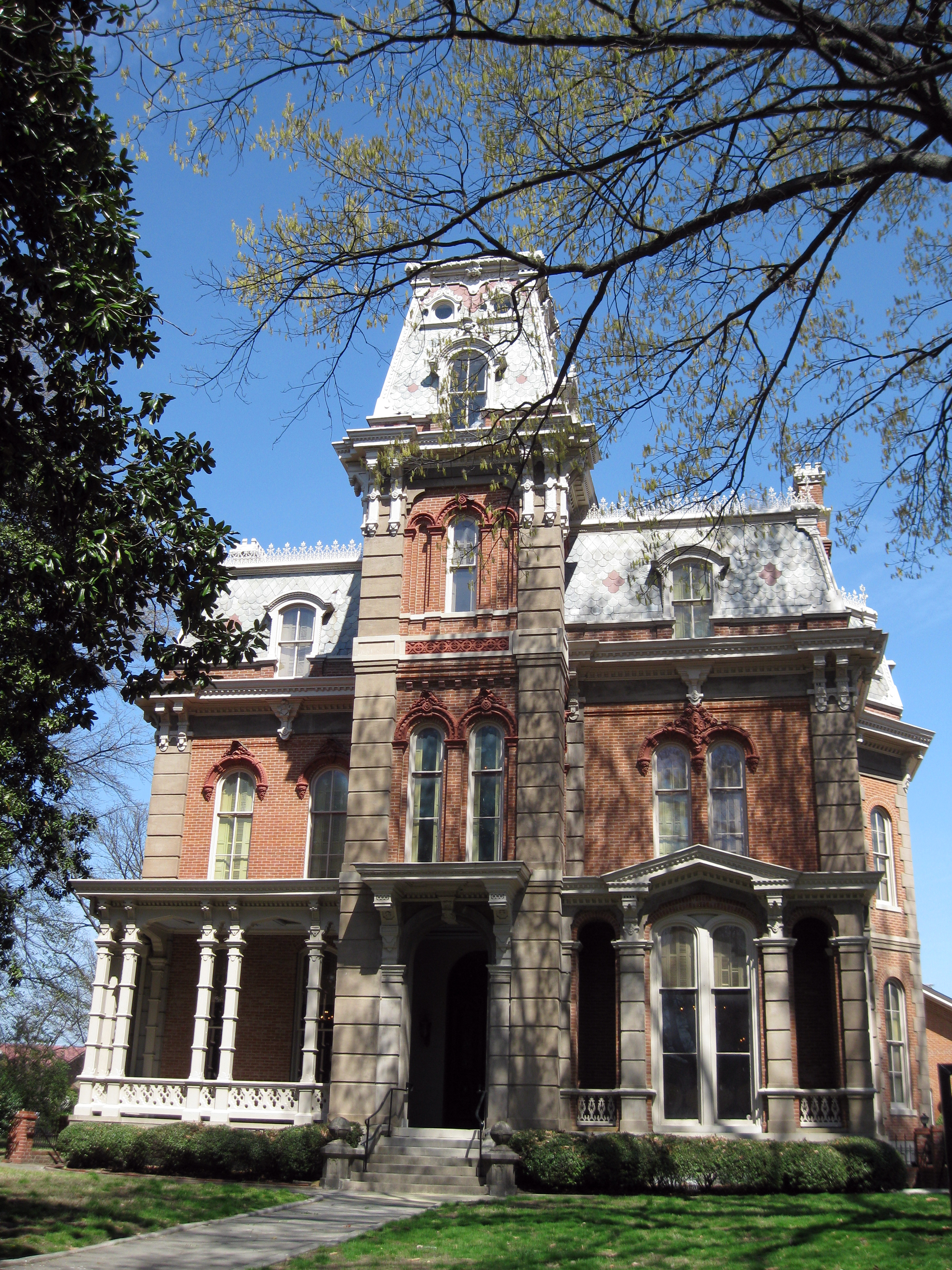
- Woodruff-Fontaine House Museum

- Location within Tennessee Location within the United States
- Location: 680-690 Adams Ave., Memphis, Tennessee
- Coordinates: 35°8′42″N 90°2′15″W
- Area: 5 acres (2.0 ha)
- Architectural style: Late Victorian, Second Empire
- Part of: Victorian Village District (ID72001253)
- NRHP reference No.: 71000835

Significant dates
- Added to NRHP: February 11, 1971
- Designated CP: December 11, 1972

The Woodruff-Fontaine House is a historic building at 680 Adams Avenue in Memphis, Tennessee, United States.

It was constructed in 1871 on Adams Avenue, which was once known as "Millionaire's Row" in Memphis. It was designed by the Jones and Baldwin firm of Edward C. Jones and Matthias H. Baldwin. Impressed by its construction, the neighbors had their home, the Goyer Lee House, expanded by the same firm.

After standing empty for many years, in 1962 the house was acquired and restored by the Association for the Preservation of Tennessee Antiquities. In 1971 the Woodruff-Fontaine House and the adjacent James Lee House were listed together on the National Register of Historic Places under the title "Lee and Fontaine Houses of the James Lee Memorial". The two houses also are included in the Victorian Village historic district. The Woodruff-Fontaine House is operated for tours, luncheons, weddings, and as a gift shop.

== See also ==
- List of historical societies in Tennessee
