= Matthias Harvey Baldwin =

American architect

Matthias H. Baldwin (1827–1891) was an American architect who worked in Memphis, Tennessee. He practiced in Memphis, Tennessee on his own and in partnership as part of Morgan & Baldwin from 1859 and with E.C. Jones (Edward Culliatt Jones) as part of Jones & Baldwin. Nicholas J. Clayton worked at Baldwin & Jones.

== Works ==
- Woodruff-Fontaine House (1870–1871) with E.C. Jones, Adams Avenue, Memphis. Built by Amos Woodruff.
- James Lee House (expansion) Adams Avenue (next door to Woodruff's house), Memphis for Charles Wesley Goyer, a sugar and molasses importer
- Beale Street Baptist Church (1867–1881) with E.C. Jones, 379 Beale Street, Memphis. Built for a black congregation.
- John S. Toof House
