= Victorian Village, Memphis =

- Victorian Village District
- U.S. National Register of Historic Places
- U.S. Historic district
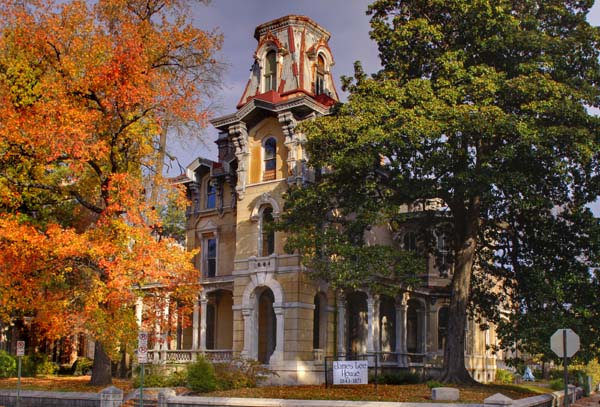
- Harsson-Goyer-Lee House, 690 East Adams Street

- Location within Tennessee Location within the United States
- Location: Adams and Jefferson Sts., Memphis, Tennessee
- Coordinates: 35°8′42″N 90°2′20″W
- Area: 28 acres (11 ha)
- Architect: Multiple
- Architectural style: Greek Revival, Late Victorian, Italianate
- NRHP reference No.: 72001253
- Added to NRHP: December 11, 1972

The Victorian Village District is an area of Memphis, Tennessee.

== Geography ==
The Victorian Village is located in the eastern quadrant of downtown Memphis.

== History ==
During Memphis' early period of growth in the mid-19th century, a few wealthy Memphians built grand, Victorian-style homes in what was then the outskirts of the city. The homes in Victorian Village were built from 1846 into the 1890s, and range in style from Neo-classical through Late Gothic Revival. Edward C. Jones, one of Memphis's most significant Victorian-era architects, and his partner, Matthias Harvey Baldwin, built the Woodruff-Fontaine House (1870) and renovated the Harsson-Goyer-Lee House (1871).

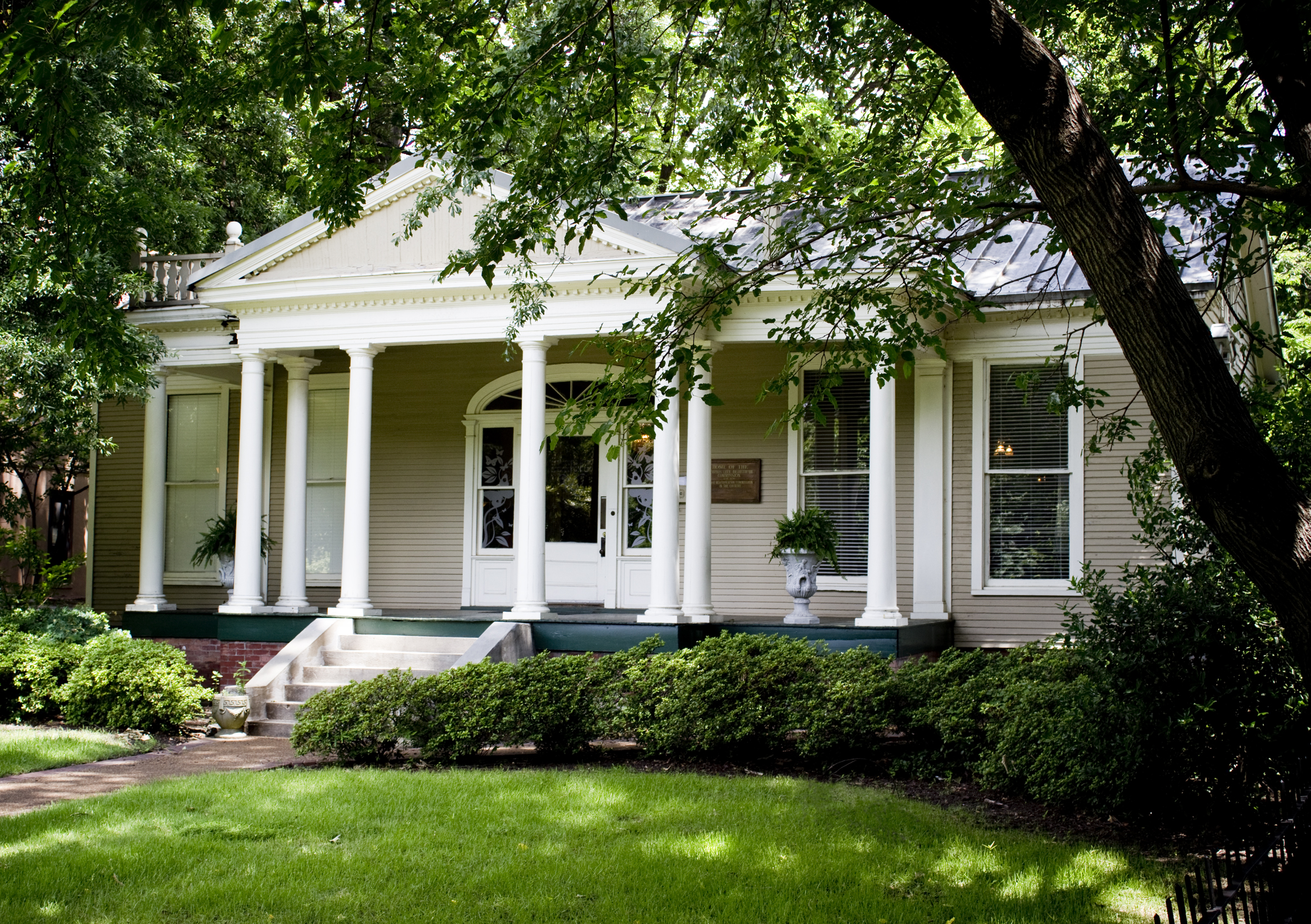
Massey House

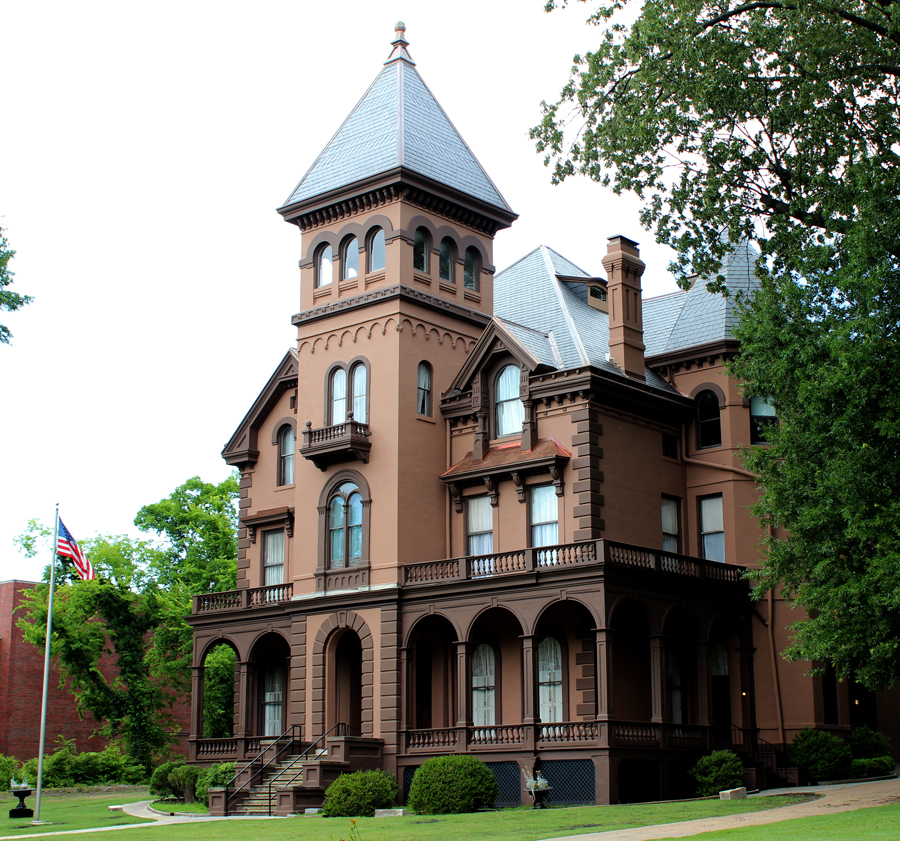
Mallory Neely House Museum

The Massey House, the oldest in the area (ca. 1846), was built for Benjamin A. Massey, an early Memphis lawyer.

The Mallory-Neely House (1852) was built in Italian villa style with a central tower for banker Isaac Kirtland and extensively renovated and expanded during the 1880s and 1890s. The interior is well preserved, with much of the original late-19th-century furnishings intact.

The Harsson-Goyer-Lee House (690 Adams, see photograph) was once the home of riverboat owner James Lee. It was expanded in 1871 by Charles Goyer, a founder of Union Planters Bank.

The Pillow-McIntyre House (ca. 1852) is a two-story Greek Revival home purchased in 1873 by Mexican War and Confederate General Gideon Pillow. This striking eclectic-style Victorian had been unused for years, but with the assistance of corporate and community donations it was refurbished in 2004.

The Woodruff-Fontaine House (1870) was built in French-Victorian style by Amos Woodruff, a successful carriage maker, entrepreneur and politician. The second resident, Noland Fontaine, was a factor in the Memphis Cotton Exchange. The house was deeded to the city in 1936, and in later years was used for an art school. In 1961 the art school moved, and the Association for the Preservation of Tennessee Antiquities took over the house and restored it with 19th-century regional antiques and textiles. A Victorian Gingerbread playhouse is also on the grounds.

The Snowden home in the Annesdale-Snowden Historic District dates from the same era. In 1850, Dr. Samuel Mansfield built this "Italianate villa" on his 200-acre (0.81 km^{2}) plantation just outside Memphis. The house was situated on a knoll above what was then the stage route to Mississippi. In 1869 Colonel Robert C. Brinkley bought the estate as a wedding gift to his daughter, Annie Overton Brinkley, and her new husband, Colonel Bogardus Snowden. The estate was named Annesdale in her honor. In the first decade of the 20th century, Col. Snowden and his sons John and Robert built two subdivisions on the estate, Annesdale Park (1903), claimed to be the first in the South, and Snowden Homestead (1910). The streets in these then-affluent subdivisions were named for the Snowden children. Memphis entrepreneur Kemmons Wilson and other well-known Memphis names resided there. After World War II, the neighborhood gradually declined until it began to be gentrified in the 1970s and after it was listed on the National Register of Historic Places in 1979. The Snowden home is not open to the public.

== Present ==
Some of these three- and four-story mansions now stand near the city's downtown along Adams Avenue. While most of the original homes are now gone, several remain as museums: the Magevney House (198 Adams), the Mallory-Neely House (652 Adams) and the Woodruff-Fontaine House (680 Adams). The Magevney House is currently open the first Saturday each month from 1pm-4pm with free admission. The Mallory-Neely House is open Friday and Saturday, 10:00-4:00. After 60+ years of being vacant, the Harsson-Goyer-Lee House has been renovated into a high-end Bed and Breakfast. The Woodruff-Fontaine House's hours are Wednesday-Sunday, 12:00-4:00 and is a popular venue for weddings and private parties.

The Victorian Village neighborhood is listed on the National Register of Historic Places.

=== Endangered homes ===
The Lowenstein-Long House (1901) at 217 N. Waldran Blvd. and the Lee-Macintyre House in Victorian Village are considered to be endangered by Memphis Heritage, a non-profit preservationist group based in the city.

== See also ==
- History of Memphis, Tennessee
