= Owl's Hill Nature Center =

Owl's Hill Nature Sanctuary
- Location within Tennessee
- Type: Forest
- Location: Williamson County, Tennessee
- Nearest city: Brentwood, Tennessee
- Coordinates: 36°1′11″N 86°52′6″W
- Area: 300 acres (120 ha)
- Open: Open for day passes Tuesday-Saturday or by public program event

The Owl's Hill Nature Sanctuary is a 300-acre (1.2 km^{2}) wildlife sanctuary in northwestern Williamson County, Tennessee.

Fossil traces in Ordovician limestone and 350-year-old giant trees, vestiges of the great eastern deciduous forest that once covered Tennessee, are important collections on the site, as are pioneer trees and seasonal wildflowers. The ponds and wetlands provide valuable amphibian habitat, home to more than a dozen species. 125 species of birds have been recorded on site through population surveys performed by the National Audubon Society. Nearly all mammals native to Middle Tennessee are in residence at Owl’s Hill.

In 1990, an ambitious Master Plan was adopted to restore the natural habitat by overcoming almost a century of farm usage. First, wildlife conditions were improved through removal of several miles of wire fencing; water sources were improved and added; old orchard trees were pruned to restore their productivity. Increases in both predator and prey populations indicate that a healthy ecosystem is now evolving. The second phase included the construction of a trail system, teaching platforms, and remodeling of the visitor center to enhance environmental education programming. Finally, in 2007, the Sanctuary initiated an exotic plant removal project. Native trees, shrubs, wildflowers and grasses are being reintroduced. Emphasis in all these areas continues to expand with current efforts directed at preserving the land surrounding the sanctuary against encroaching development.

Through public programs and working with the Land Trust for Tennessee (founded by governor Phil Bredesen) Owl’s Hill has become a focal point for neighboring landowners interested in placing conservation easements on their land. In the fall of 2000, a species inventory was completed. Owl's Hill retained two biologists to undertake a 20-month survey using scientific sampling techniques to document amphibian and reptile populations. Addenda to the inventory catalogue include wildflower, tree, butterfly, bird and mammal populations.
