= Adams Avenue Historic District =

Historic district in Tennessee, United States

- U.S. National Register of Historic Places
- U.S. Historic district
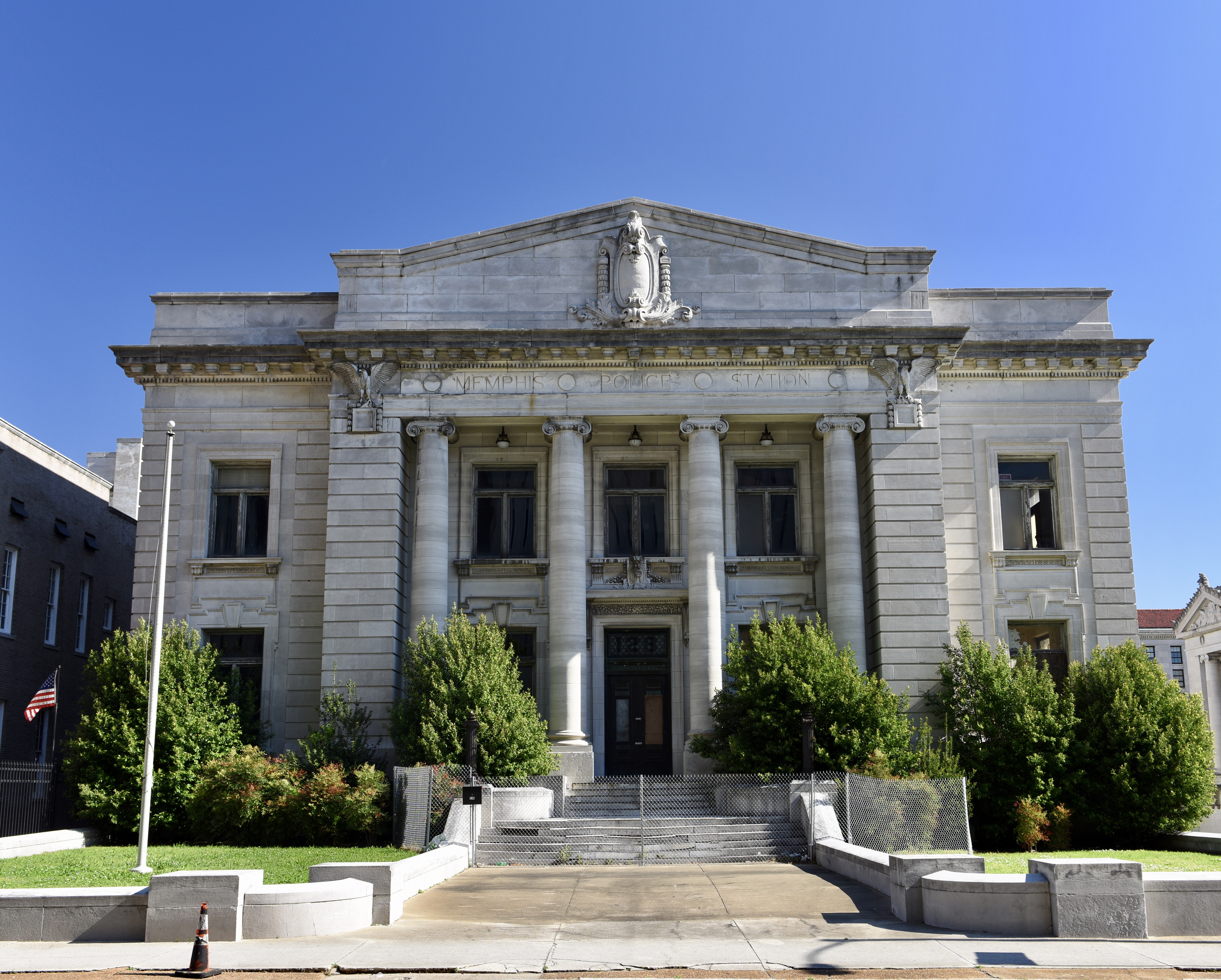
- Memphis Police Station, 128 Adams Avenue

- Location within Tennessee Location within the United States
- Location: Adams and Washington Aves., Memphis, Tennessee
- Coordinates: 35.148333°N 90.049722°W
- Area: 9 acres (3.6 ha)
- Architect: Multiple
- Architectural style: Classical Revival, Late Gothic Revival
- NRHP reference No.: 80004481
- Added to NRHP: November 25, 1980

The Adams Avenue Historic District in Memphis, Tennessee is a 9 acres (3.6 ha) historic district which was listed on the National Register of Historic Places in 1980.

It contains six contributing buildings:

- St. Peter's Roman Catholic Church (1852), at 190 Adams Ave.
- North Memphis Savings Bank (1901), at 110 Adams Ave.
- Shelby County Courthouse (1909), at 160 Adams Ave., which was designed by architects H. D. Hale and James Gamble Rogers, who both were students of the Ecole de Beaux Arts in Paris. It has sculpture groups in its four pediments, designed by J. Massey Rhind.
- Fire Engine House No. 1 (1910), at 118 Adams Ave.
- Memphis Police Station (1911), at 128 or 130 Adams Ave.
- Criminal Courts Building (1925), at 156 Washington Ave.
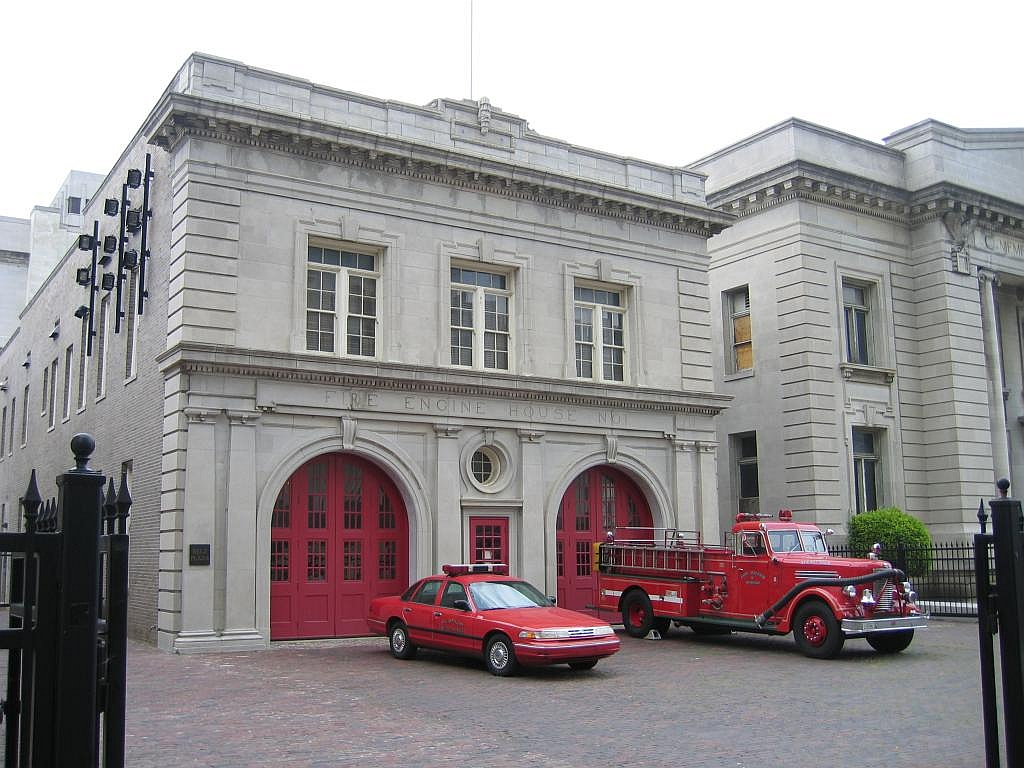
Fire Engine House No. 1

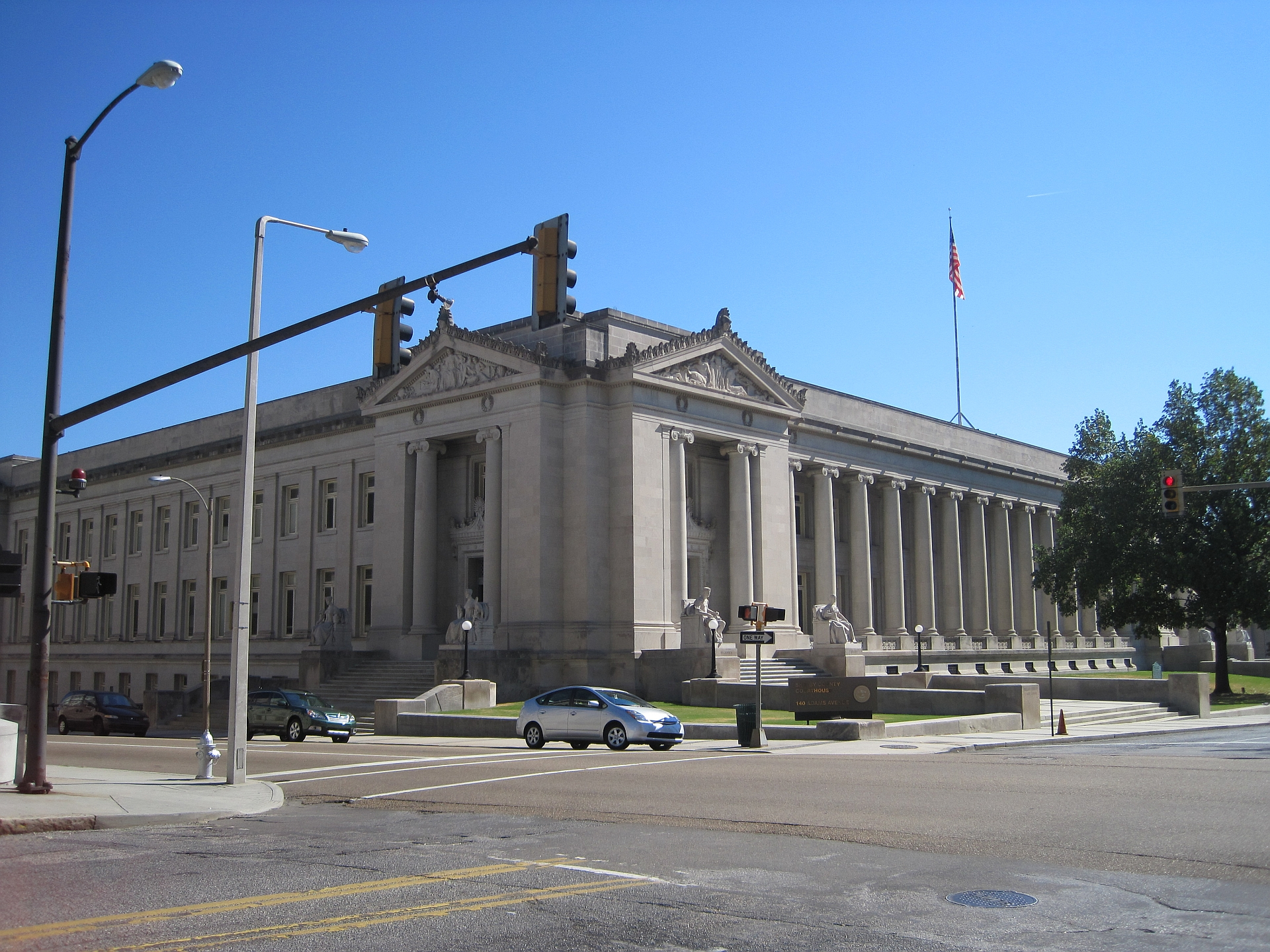
Shelby County Courthouse

== History ==
Nathan Bedford Forrest reportedly operated a slave market in this district, said to be the South’s largest at the time.
