= List of nature centers =

This is a list of nature centers.

== Americas ==
=== United States ===
- List of nature centers in Alabama
- List of nature centers in Alaska
- List of nature centers in Arizona
- List of nature centers in Arkansas
- List of nature centers in California
- List of nature centers in Colorado
- List of nature centers in Connecticut
- List of nature centers in Delaware
- List of nature centers in Florida
- List of nature centers in Georgia (U.S. state)
- List of nature centers in Illinois
- List of nature centers in Indiana
- List of nature centers in Iowa
- List of nature centers in Kansas
- List of nature centers in Kentucky
- List of nature centers in Maine
- List of nature centers in Maryland
- List of nature centers in Massachusetts
- List of nature centers in Michigan
- List of nature centers in Minnesota
- List of nature centers in Mississippi
- List of nature centers in Missouri
- List of nature centers in New Hampshire
- List of nature centers in New Jersey
- List of nature centers in New York
- List of nature centers in North Carolina
- List of nature centers in Ohio
- List of nature centers in Oklahoma
- List of nature centers in Oregon
- List of nature centers in Pennsylvania
- List of nature centers in Rhode Island
- List of nature centers in South Carolina
- List of nature centers in South Dakota
- List of nature centers in Tennessee
- List of nature centers in Texas
- List of nature centers in Utah
- List of nature centers in Vermont
- List of nature centers in Virginia
- List of nature centers in Washington (state)

=== Costa Rica ===
- Arenal Eco Zoo, Costa Rica
- Monteverde Nature Center, Costa Rica
- Selvatura Park, Costa Rica

=== Panama ===
- Marine Exhibition Center of Punta Culebra, Panama City

=== Trinidad and Tobago ===
- Asa Wright Nature Centre, Trinidad and Tobago

=== Brazil ===
- Instituto Butantan, Brazil

== Africa ==
=== South Africa ===
- Delta Environmental Centre, Parkview, South Africa

== Asia ==
=== China ===
- Lions Nature Education Centre, Sai Kung District, Hong Kong
- Fanling Environmental Resource Centre, Fanling, Hong Kong
- Old Wan Chai Post Office, Wan Chai

=== India ===
- Bhavan’s Nature and Adventure Centre, Andheri West, Mumbai
- Maharashtra Nature Park, Dharavi, Mumbai

=== Japan ===
- Gunma Insect World

=== Korea ===
- Suncheon Bay Ecological Park

=== Malaysia ===
- Kota Kinabalu Wetland Centre

=== Taiwan ===
- Chukou Nature Center

== Europe ==
=== Andorra ===
- Nature Interpretation Centre, Ordino

=== Belgium ===
- Riveo Centre, Hotton

=== Denmark ===
- Fjordcentret Voer Færgested
- Klostermølle, Skanderborg
- NaturBornholm, Aakirkeby
- Skagen Odde Nature Centre, Skagen

=== Estonia ===
- Ice Age Centre

=== Finland ===
- Siida, Inari
- Villa Elfvik, Espoo

=== Germany ===
- Langeneß Wadden Sea Station, Langeneß, Schleswig-Holstein
- Müritzeum, Waren (Müritz), Mecklenburg-Vorpommern

=== Norway ===
- Authorized visitor centres Norway
- Agder Natural History Museum and Botanical Garden
- Hardangervidda Natursenter

=== Republic of Ireland ===
- Wildlife and Heritage Centre, Clontibret

=== Spain ===
- Ataria, Salburua, Basque Country
- Cabarceno Natural Park, Cantabria
- Granollers Museum of Natural Sciences, Granollers, Catalonia
- The Nature Center of Menorca, Ferreries, Balearic Islands

=== Switzerland ===
- Nature centres of Pro Natura, Aletsch and Champ-Pittet in Yverdon-les-Bains

== Oceania ==
=== New Zealand ===
- Pukaha / Mount Bruce National Wildlife Centre, New Zealand
