= List of nature centers in Delaware =

This is a list of nature centers and environmental education centers in the state of Delaware.

To use the sortable tables: click on the icons at the top of each column to sort that column in alphabetical order; click again for reverse alphabetical order.

Name	Location	County	Region	Summary
Abbott's Mill Nature Center	Milford	Sussex	Southern	website, operated by the Delaware Nature Society, part of 313 acre Milford Millponds Nature Preserve, includes tours of Abbott's Mill
Ashland Nature Center	Hockessin	New Castle	Northern	website, operated by the Delaware Nature Society, 81 acres
Baldcypress Nature Center	Laurel	Sussex	Southern	Located in 2,109-acre Trap Pond State Park
Bethany Beach Nature Center	Bethany Beach	Sussex	Southern	website, 26 acres, operated by the Town
Bombay Hook National Wildlife Refuge	Smyrna	Kent	Central	15,978 acres of mostly tidal salt marsh, visitor center exhibits, programs, 12-mile auto tour, five walking trails (2 handicapped accessible), three observation towers
Blackbird State Forest Education Center		New Castle	Northern	Exhibits and programs about Delaware's forests and their management, open by appointment
Brandywine Creek Nature Center	Wilmington	New Castle	Northern	Located in 933-acre Brandywine Creek State Park
Carmine Environmental Center	Lewes	Sussex	Southern	165 acres located on the western shore of Rehoboth Bay, part of Camp Arrowhead
Delaware National Estuarine Research Reserve: St. Jones Reserve	Dover	Kent	Central	3,750 acres, St Jones Center for Estuarine Studies, hiking trails, hands-on interactive activities and exhibits, a recycling center, restoration demonstration areas
Dupont Environmental Education Center	Wilmington	New Castle	Northern	website, operated by the Delaware Nature Society, 212 acres at the Russell W. Peterson Urban Wildlife Refuge
Dupont Nature Center	Milford	Sussex	Southern	website, operated by the Delaware Division of Fish and Wildlife in the Mispillion Harbor Reserve on the Delaware Bay
Environmental Outpost	Smyrna	Kent	Central	Operated by the Delaware AeroSpace Education Foundation in the 90-acre Big Oak County Park, environmental and aerospace science programs
Killens Pond Nature Center	Felton	Kent	Central	Located on the 66 acre pond in Killens Pond State Park
Lums Pond State Park	Bear	New Castle	Northern	1,790 acres, features the Whale Wallow Nature Center
Redden Forest Education Center	Georgetown	Sussex	Southern	Exhibits and programs about Redden State Forest
Seaside Nature Center	Lewes	Sussex	Southern	Located in 5,193-acre Cape Henlopen State Park
White Clay Creek State Park	Newark	New Castle	Northern	3,300 acres, features the Chambers House Nature Center

== Resources ==
- EcoDelaware
- Delaware Association for Environmental Education
