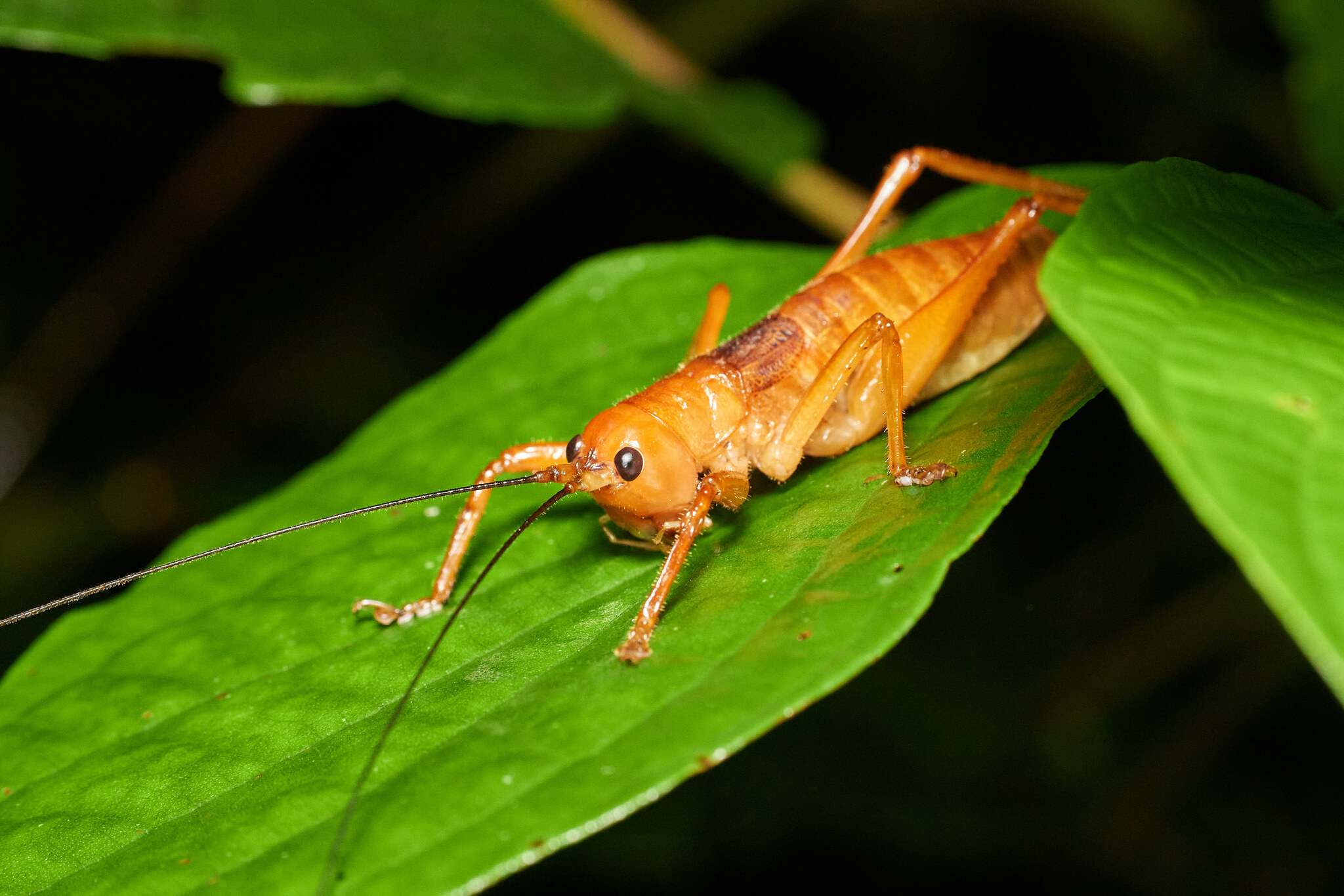
- Near Arenal volcano

Scientific classification
- Kingdom: Animalia
- Phylum: Arthropoda
- Class: Insecta
- Order: Orthoptera
- Suborder: Ensifera
- Family: Tettigoniidae
- Subfamily: Pseudophyllinae
- Genus: Melanonotus
- Species: M. powellorum

Binomial name
- Melanonotus powellorum Rentz, 1975

= Melanonotus powellorum =

Species of katydid

Melanonotus powellorum is a species of katydid in the subfamily Pseudophyllinae. It was described in 1975 from Monteverde, Costa Rica.

== Description ==
Malanonotus powellorum is yellowish brown, with a large, rounded head and long antennae. It is sluggish, flightless, and nocturnal, emerging to feed at night among the leaves of the forest understory.

== Range ==
This species is known from Monteverde, where it is common, and also elsewhere in Costa Rica.

== Etymology ==
The specific epithet honors George and Harriett Powell, researchers who helped establish the Monteverde Cloud Forest Reserve and preserve the habitat of this species.
