= List of nature centers in Mississippi =

This is a list of nature centers and environmental education centers in the state of Mississippi.

To use the sortable tables: click on the icons at the top of each column to sort that column in alphabetical order; click again for reverse alphabetical order.

Name	Location	County	Region	Summary
Box Environmental Education Center	Brooksville	Noxubee	East Central	website, operated by the Starkville School District, located on the 48,000-acre Sam D. Hamilton Noxubee National Wildlife Refuge
Clinton Community Nature Center	Clinton	Hinds	Southwest	website, 33 acres
Grand Bay National Estuarine Research Reserve	Moss Point	Jackson	Southeast	18,400 acres, features the Grand Bay Coastal Resources Center Interpretative Area
Mississippi Museum of Natural Science	Jackson	Hinds	Southwest	Natural history museum, aquarium displays, 2.5 miles of nature trails, programs, located in LeFleur's Bluff State Park
Pascagoula River Audubon Center	Moss Point	Jackson	Southeast	website, operated by the National Audubon Society
Plymouth Bluff Center	Columbus	Lowndes	East Central	website, operated by the Mississippi University for Women, outdoor education center with museum
Scranton Nature Center	Pascagoula	Jackson	Southeast	website, operated by the City in IG Levy Park
Strawberry Plains Audubon Center	Holly Springs	Marshall	North	website, 2,500 acres, operated by the National Audubon Society, features restored 1850s mansion
