= List of nature centers in Colorado =

Coordinates: 38.9972°N 105.5478°W

The location of the State of Colorado in the United States of America.

This is a list of nature centers and environmental education centers in the U.S. State of Colorado.

== Nature centers ==
To use the sortable tables: click on the icons at the top of each column to sort that column in alphabetical order; click again for reverse alphabetical order.

Name	Location	County	Region	Summary
AWQUA Lounge	Aurora	Arapahoe	Denver area	website, open seasonally, operated by the city, watershed and quality of the Aurora Reservoir
Audubon Center at Chatfield State Park	Littleton	Jefferson	Denver area	Operated by the Audubon Society of Greater Denver in the 3,895-acre park
Barr Lake Nature Center	Brighton	Adams	Denver area	Located in 2,715-acre Barr Lake State Park, this is the only true Nature Center in the Colorado state parks system.
Bear Creek Regional Park and Nature Center	Colorado Springs	El Paso	South-Central Colorado	Operated by the County in Bear Creek Regional Park, 2 miles of trails
Bluff Lake Nature Center	Denver	Denver	Denver area	123 acres, urban wildlife refuge
Durango Nature Center	Durango	La Plata	Southwest Colorado	website, 142 acres, operated by Durango Nature Studies
Evergreen Nature Center	Evergreen	Jefferson	Denver area	website, operated seasonally by Evergreen Audubon, a local chapter of the National Audubon Society
Flagstaff Nature Center	Boulder	Boulder	Central	website, operated by the City on Flagstaff Mountain
Fountain Creek Nature Center	Colorado Springs	El Paso	South-Central Colorado	Operated by the County in Fountain Creek Regional Park, exhibits include wetlands, plants, wildlife, weather and climate, and the mountain backdrop
Garden of the Gods Visitor & Nature Center	Colorado Springs	El Paso	South-Central Colorado	3,300-acre park, exhibits include minerals, geology, plants, local wildlife, Native American culture
Indigo Mountain Nature Center	Lake George	Park	South-Central Colorado	website, sanctuary for captive born wildlife, exotic and alternative pets, not open to the public
Lookout Mountain Nature Center	Golden	Jefferson	Denver area	website, 110 acres, operated by the county, interactive exhibits about the flora and fauna of the foothills ecosystem, hands-on play room and observation room
MacGregor Ranch	Estes Park	Larimer	High Rockies	website, working cattle ranch, 1896 ranch house museum and historic outbuildings, rock and mineral collections, animal displays, trails
Majestic View Nature Center	Arvada	Jefferson	Denver area	website, 80 acres, operated by the city, hands-on nature and environmental displays, wildlife exhibits, kid's area, classrooms and meeting space
Morrison Nature Center at the Star K Ranch	Aurora	Arapahoe	Denver area	website, 208 acres, operated by the city, seasonally changing exhibits on local plants and animal life, children's play area, live animal exhibits
Nature and Wildlife Discovery Center	Pueblo	Pueblo	Central	Located in Rock Canyon on the banks of the Arkansas River, features wildlife rehabilitation facility that specializes in birds of prey
Plains Conservation Center	Aurora	Arapahoe	Denver area	1,100-acre main site with museum and nature center, exhibits on the wildlife, plant life and people of the prairie
Poudre Learning Center	Greeley	Weld	Northern Colorado area	website, 200 acres located on the banks of the Cache la Poudre River and the Poudre River Trail., operated by the Greeley-Evans School District, Eaton School District and Windsor-Severance School District, building connections and understandings of nature, with Welcome Center including displays, environmental programs, live animals, classrooms and meeting, event space miles of trails and more. This is the only nature center for K-12 environmental education in Weld County.
South Platte Park Carson Nature Center	Littleton	Jefferson	Denver area	website, operated by the South Suburban Park and Recreation District, over 880 acres of open space and 5 lakes
Standley Lake Nature Center	Westminster	Jefferson	Denver area	website, operated by the City of Westminster, Features 1,000 acres surface area of lake, 2,000 acres of open space, weekly nature programs, nature center includes children's area, live animal exhibits, natural history and more.
The Nature Place	Florissant	Teller	South-Central Colorado	website, over 6,000 acres, non-profit conference and retreat center dedicated to leadership and team development, providing experiences in natural history and studies of natural systems
Vail Nature Center	Vail	Eagle	High Rockies	website, 7 acres, operated by the Town, open seasonally, hosts bird, wildflower and beaver pond hikes
Wild Bear Mountain Ecology Center	Nederland	Boulder	Central	website, natural science education programs, separate 5 acre preserve

== See also ==
- List of nature centers in the United States
- Bibliography of Colorado
- Geography of Colorado
- History of Colorado
- Index of Colorado-related articles
- List of Colorado-related lists
- Outline of Colorado
