= Mississippi Roads =

- Genre: Documentary
- Presented by: Walt Grayson
- Country of origin: United States
- Original language: English
- No. of seasons: 19
- No. of episodes: 910

Production
- Executive producer: Key Ivy
- Producers: John Allen; Art Mcalpin
- Running time: 26 min.
- Production company: Mississippi Public Broadcasting

Original release
- Network: Mississippi Public Broadcasting
- Release: September 22, 1985 – 1994
- Release: 1999 – June 1, 2023

Mississippi Roads is a show on Mississippi Public Broadcasting. Episodes are 26 minutes and 46 seconds long. Some episodes have aired on Create as well.

The program originally aired from 1985 to 1994 and was brought back in 1999, when Walt Grayson was selected as the host. Grayson was born and raised in Greenville, Mississippi. He graduated high school there and then studied at Mississippi College and began his career as a preacher, but switched to broadcasting and became a weather anchor and feature presenter at WLBT-TV. He now works for WJTV and has authored four books.

The show has filmed footage of old pipe organs as part of the story of the state's musical history.

== Episodes ==
- Museums, February 19, 2023, features Hattiesburg Pocket, MS Aviation Heritage, Ground Zero Hurricane Museum, and Margaret's Grocery
- Back to the Blues #2 February 12. 2023 featuring Terry "Harmonica" Bean, 100 Men Hall, Central Miss. Blues Society, Gateway to the Blues
- Places to Go, Things to See March 20, 2022 featuring Mississippi River Museum, Biking on the Natchez Trace, Beauvoir, and "Walt’s favorite places"
- Being of Service February 24, 2022 featuring therapy dogs, "shower power", and French Camp Academy Baker
- Towns and Things February 20, 2022 featuring Carrollton, front porches, Jacinto Courthouse, and Brookhaven
- Wise, Wilfull, Women, February 13, 2022, featuring Women's Professional Football, the Belmont Hotel, and Foot Print Farms
- What the Rivers Leave Behind, February 6, 2022, featuring Red Bluff, The Grand Bay National Estuarine Research Reserve, and "ancient glacier rocks"
- Cars, November 15, 2020, featuring the Model T Club, Scraping the Coast, Interstate Digital Signs, and The Room Car Collection
