= List of nature centers in Rhode Island =

This is a list of nature centers and environmental education centers in the state of Rhode Island. To use the sortable tables: click on the icons at the top of each column to sort that column in alphabetical order; click again for reverse alphabetical order.

Name	Location	County	Summary
Audubon Environmental Education Center	Bristol	Bristol	website, 28-acre McIntosh Wildlife Refuge, operated by the Audubon Society of Rhode Island, natural history museum and aquarium
Biomes Marine Biology Center	North Kingstown	Washington	website, aquarium and marine science education center
Frosty Drew Nature Center and Observatory	Charlestown	Washington	website, located in Ninegret Park
George B. Parker Woodland	Coventry	Kent	website, 860 acres, operated by the Audubon Society of Rhode Island, features nature center barn
Goosewing Beach Preserve	Little Compton	Newport	website, 75 acres, features the Benjamin Family Environmental Center, operated by The Nature Conservancy
Narragansett Bay National Estuarine Research Reserve	Prudence Island	Newport	2,353 acres on 3 islands, Narragansett Bay Research Reserve Lab & Learning Center exhibits, education programs
Ninigret National Wildlife Refuge	Charlestown	Washington	900 acres, Kettle Pond Visitor Center features exhibits, education programs
Norman Bird Sanctuary	Middletown	Newport	325 acres with 7 miles of trails, natural history museum
Save the Bay Exploration Center & Aquarium	Newport	Newport	website, 2 facilities, aquarium, environmental education and conservation programs
Tri-Pond Park Nature Center	South Kingstown	Washington	website, 99 acres, operated by the town
W. Alton Jones Environmental Education Center	West Greenwich	Kent	website, operated by the University of Rhode Island, 2,300 acres, residential environmental education programs
