= List of nature centers in Arkansas =

This is a list of nature centers and environmental education centers in the state of Arkansas.

To use the sortable tables: click on the icons at the top of each column to sort that column in alphabetical order; click again for reverse alphabetical order.

Name	Location	County	Region	Summary
Arkansas River Visitor Center	Russellville	Pope	North Central	website, natural and cultural history of the Arkansas River and the construction of Lake Dardanelle, operated by the U.S. Army Corps of Engineers
Crowley's Ridge Nature Center	Jonesboro	Greene	Eastern	160 acres, operated by the Arkansas Game and Fish Commission, geology, wildlife and natural history of Crowley's Ridge
Delta Rivers Nature Center	Pine Bluff	Jefferson	Central	website, operated by the Arkansas Game and Fish Commission in 130-acre Pine Bluff Regional Park, natural and cultural history of the Arkansas River, aquariums
Fred Berry Conservation Education Center on Crooked Creek	Yellville	Marion	North Central	website, operated by the Arkansas Game and Fish Commission, 421 acres, features a wet lab, exhibits and wildlife native to the area, outdoor Ozark native plant garden and wildlife viewing area
Janet Huckabee Arkansas River Valley Nature Center	Fort Smith	Sebastian	Western	website, 170 acres, operated by the Arkansas Game and Fish Commission, natural history of the Arkansas River Valley
Ponca Elk Education Center	Ponca	Newton	North Central	website, operated by the Arkansas Game and Fish Commission, exhibits about elk, black bear and other area wildlife, elk viewing area in Boxley Valley
Potlatch Conservation Education Center at Cook's Lake	Casscoe	Arkansas	Eastern	website, 72 acres, operated by the Arkansas Game and Fish Commission for conservation education programs
Rick Evans Grandview Prairie Conservation Education Center	Columbus	Hempstead	Southwest	website, 4,885 acres, operated by the Arkansas Game and Fish Commission for conservation education programs
South Fork Nature Center	Clinton	Van Buren	Western	website, 65 acres, 2 miles of trails, located on Greers Ferry Lake, operated by the Gates Rogers Foundation
Witt Stephens Jr. Central Arkansas Nature Center	Little Rock	Pulaski	Central	website, located in Julius Breckling Riverfront Park, operated by the Arkansas Game and Fish Commission, exhibits include state fish habitats, fish and wildlife management and the history of the commission

== Resources ==
- Arkansas Environmental Education Association
