= List of nature centers in Kansas =

This is a list of nature centers and environmental education centers in the state of Kansas.

To use the sortable tables: click on the icons at the top of each column to sort that column in alphabetical order; click again for reverse alphabetical order.

| Name | Location | County | Region | Summary |
|---|---|---|---|---|
| Chaplin Nature Center | Arkansas City | Cowley | Flint Hills | website, operated by the Wichita Audubon Society, over 5 miles of trails |
| Dillon Nature Center | Hutchinson | Reno | South Central | website, 100 acres, operated by the City, aquariums, interactive exhibits about the sand prairie environment and central Kansas, microscopic investigation stations, discovery drawers, nature playscape |
| Ernie Miller Nature Center | Olathe | Johnson | Northeast | website, operated by the County, displays, live animals |
| Flint Hills Discovery Center | Manhattan | Riley | Flint Hills | Operated by the city of Manhattan, features exhibits detailing local history and preservation of the Flint Hills, a theater, a specialized interactive playground for youth and parents, and a temporary exhibition gallery |
| Great Plains Nature Center | Wichita | Sedgwick | Flint Hills | website, a partnership of the City, State and USFWS, located in 232-acre Chisholm Creek Park, live native wildlife |
| Kansas Wetlands Educational Center | Great Bend | Barton | Central | website, education center for 49,000-acre wetlands of the Cheyenne Bottoms and the Quivira National Wildlife Refuge, operated by Fort Hays State University and the Kansas Department of Wildlife and Parks |
| Milford Nature Center | Junction City | Geary | Flint Hills | website, operated by the State near Milford Lake, exhibits, dioramas, indoor and outdoor live animals, nature playground; adjacent to Milford Fish Hatchery |
| Mr. & Mrs. F.L. Schlagle Library | Kansas City | Wyandotte | Northeast | website, city library and nature center with science and outdoor education programs, located in 1,500-acre Wyandotte County Lake Park |
| Olathe Prairie Center | Olathe | Johnson | Northeast | website, operated by the State, 300-acre tallgrass preserve and outdoor education site |
| Prairie Oak Nature Center | Leawood | Johnson | Northeast | website, operated by the City in 115-acre Ironwoods Park |
| Prairie Park Nature Center | Lawrence | Douglas | Northeast | website, 80 acres, operated by the City |
| Pratt Education Center | Pratt | Pratt | South Central | website, operated by the State, displays, dioramas, and exhibits about the native birds, fish, mammals and reptiles of Kansas, live aquariums |
| Southeast Kansas Nature Center | Galena | Cherokee | Southeast | website, located 10 acres in Schermerhorn Park |
| Stone Nature Center | Topeka | Shawnee | Flint Hills | website, 372 acres, operated by The Villages, private preserve on a group home for children, provides environmental education and adventure challenge programs |
| WATER Center | Wichita | Sedgwick | Flint Hills | website, operated by the City, treatment center for polluted groundwater, water and pollution exhibits and programs |

== Resources ==
- Kansas Association for Conservation and Environmental Education
- Natural Kansas - Kansas Department of Wildlife, Parks & Tourism
