= List of nature centers in Alabama =

This is a list of nature centers and environmental education centers in the state of Alabama.

To use the sortable tables: click on the icons at the top of each column to sort that column in alphabetical order; click again for reverse alphabetical order.

Name	Location	County	Region	Summary
Cahaba Environmental Center at Living River	Montevallo	Shelby	Central Alabama	440 acres, an outdoor education organization devoted to hands-on, inquiry-based learning
Hays Nature Preserve	Huntsville	Madison	North Alabama	website, over 10 miles of trails, education center, natural playground; site #30 on North Alabama Birding Trail
Gatra Wehle Nature Center at Historic Blakeley State Park	Spanish Fort	Baldwin	South Alabama	1,400 acres. operated by the Alabama Department of Conservation and Natural Resources, conservation and environmental educational exhibits about the Mobile-Tensaw River Delta
Huntsville Botanical Garden	Huntsville	Madison	North Alabama	112 acres, nature center overlooks the lake and is open May through September, features butterfly house
Louise Kreher Forest Ecology Preserve	Auburn	Lee	Central Alabama	120 acres, an outreach program of the Auburn University School of Forestry & Wildlife Sciences
McDowell Environmental Center	Nauvoo	Winston	North Alabama	website, 1,140 acres, one to five day outdoor learning experiences for school groups
Oak Mountain State Park	Pelham	Shelby	Central Alabama	9,940 acres, includes the Oak Mountain Interpretive Center and the Alabama Wildlife Center
Robert G. Wehle Nature Center	Midway	Bullock	Central Alabama	website, 25 acres, operated by the Alabama Department of Conservation and Natural Resources
Ruffner Mountain Nature Center	Birmingham	Jefferson	Central Alabama	1,011 acres with 12 miles of trails
Southern Environmental Center	Birmingham	Jefferson	Central Alabama	Located on the campus of Birmingham-Southern College, environmental education museum and 4 acre ecoscape
Weeks Bay National Estuarine Research Reserve	Fairhope	Baldwin	South Alabama	Over 6,000 acres (2,400 ha) of tidal and forested wetlands within the greater Mobile Bay estuarine system, interpretive center features live and preserved native animals, education programs
Wheeler National Wildlife Refuge	Decatur	Morgan	North Alabama	35,000 acres, visitor center exhibits about area wildlife and habitats, wildlife observation building

== Resources ==
- Environmental Education Association of Alabama
