= List of nature centers in Utah =

Utah Nature Centers (Hover mouse over pog to popup clickable link)

This is a list of nature centers and environmental education centers in the state of Utah.

To use the sortable tables: click on the icons at the top of each column to sort that column in alphabetical order; click again for reverse alphabetical order.

Name	Location	County	Region	Summary
Bear River Migratory Bird Refuge	Brigham City	Box Elder	North	74,000 acres, Hansen Wildlife Education Center and nature programs
Great Salt Lake Nature Center	Farmington	Davis	North	website, operated by the Utah Division of Wildlife Resources on the 300-acre Farmington Bay Waterfowl Management Area
Jordanelle State Park	Francis	Wasatch	North	Rock Cliff Nature Center currently closed
Kennecott Nature Center	Murray	Salt Lake	North	Operated by the Murray School District
Ogden Nature Center	Ogden	Weber	North	152 acres, features live animal exhibits, trails, ponds, bird blinds, observation towers, treehouses, gardens
Stokes Nature Center	Logan	Cache	North	website, located in Logan Canyon
Swaner Preserve and EcoCenter	Park City	Summit	North	Includes 1,200-acre wildlife refuge, an environmental education facility, a 100-acre farm, and 10 miles of trails, operated by Utah State University
Tonaquint Nature Center	St. George	Washington	Southwest	website, operated by the City in Tonaquint Park
Zion Nature Center	Springdale	Washington	Southwest	Nature exhibits and education programs for Zion National Park
