= List of nature centers in Arizona =

This is a list of nature centers and environmental education centers in the state of Arizona.

To use the sortable tables: click on the icons at the top of each column to sort that column in alphabetical order; click again for reverse alphabetical order.

Name	Location	County	Region	Summary
The Arboretum at Flagstaff	Flagstaff	Coconino	North Central	Open seasonally, located on 200 acres within the Coconino National Forest, environmental education programs, visitor center exhibits, horticulture center
Cave Creek Regional Park	Cave Creek	Maricopa	South Central	website, operated by the County, 2,922 acres, features a nature center
Colorado River Nature Center	Bullhead City	Mohave	Northwest	website, 140 acres, operated by the Arizona Game and Fish Department, the City and the Bureau of Land Management
Community Nature Center Open Space Preserve	Prescott	Yavapai	Central	website, 18 acres, operated by the City
Chandler Nature Center at Veterans Oasis Park	Chandler	Maricopa	South Central	website, 113 acres, operated by the City,
Estrella Mountain Regional Park	Goodyear	Maricopa	South Central	website, operated by the County, 19,840 acres of desert and mountains, features a nature center
Gray Hawk Nature Center	Sierra Vista	Cochise	Southeast	website
Hassayampa River Preserve	Wickenburg	Maricopa	South Central	website, operated by the Nature Conservancy, features the Arthur L. Johnson Visitor Center and programs
Highlands Center for Natural History	Prescott	Yavapai	Central	website, 80 acres
Nina Mason Rio Salado Audubon Center	Phoenix	Maricopa	South Central	website, located in the 600-acre, city-owned Rio Salado Habitat Restoration Area, operated by the National Audubon Society
Ramsey Canyon Preserve	Sierra Vista	Cochise	Southeast	website, operated by the Nature Conservancy
Usery Mountain Regional Park	Mesa	Maricopa	South Central	website, operated by the County, 3,648 acres, features a nature center
White Mountain Nature Center	Pinetop-Lakeside	Navajo	North Central	website, 10 acres, also does wildlife rehabilitation
White Tank Library & Nature Center	Waddell	Maricopa	South Central	Operated by the County in White Tank Mountain Regional Park with 29,271 acres, features live native reptiles
Willow Bend Environmental Education Center	Flagstaff	Coconino	North Central	website, operated by the County at Sawmill Park

== Resources ==
- Arizona Association for Environmental Education
