= List of nature centers in Michigan =

This is a list of nature centers and environmental education centers in the state of Michigan.

To use the sortable tables: click on the icons at the top of each column to sort that column in alphabetical order; click again for reverse alphabetical order.

Name	Location	County	Region	Summary
Bay City Recreation Area	Bay City	Bay	Flint/Tri-Cities	2,100-acre state park, Saginaw Bay Visitor Center features an exhibit hall with interactive natural history displays, a 100-seat auditorium, environmental education programs are offered year round for the public, school groups and other groups
Blandford Nature Center	Grand Rapids	Kent	West Michigan	website, 264 acres
Boardman River Nature Center	Traverse City	Grand Traverse	Northern Michigan	505 acres, operated by the Grand Traverse Conservation District
Burgess-Shadbush Nature Center	Shelby Township	Macomb	Southeastern Michigan	website, operated by the town in River Bends Park
Calvin Ecosystem Preserve & Native Gardens	Grand Rapids	Kent	West Michigan	website, 104 acres, Bunker Interpretive Center, native demonstration gardens, education programs
Carl T. Johnson Hunting And Fishing Center	Cadillac	Wexford	Northern Michigan	website, interpretive center for Mitchell State Park
Chippewa Nature Center	Midland	Midland	Flint/Tri-Cities	Over 1,348 acres with 15 miles of trails, hands-on exhibits of the different types of ecosystems found at the center
Dahlem Environmental Education Center	Jackson	Jackson	Central Michigan	website, operated by the Dahlem Conservancy, almost 300 acres
Degraaf Nature Center	Holland	Allegan	West Michigan	website, operated by the city, 18 acres
DeVries Nature Conservancy	Owosso	Shiawassee	Central Michigan	website, 136 acres, over 4 miles of trails, farm, historic carriage and sleigh museum, nature playscape, nature programs, gardens
Dinosaur Hill Nature Preserve	Rochester	Oakland	Southeastern Michigan	website, 16 acres including Paint Creek, trails connect to Paint Creek Trail, owned by City of Rochester, operated by non-profit Dinosaur Hill Nature Preserve. Open Friday, Saturday, & Sunday afternoons, trails open dawn-dusk 7 days. nature programs for all ages, birthday parties, Children's Garden
Dousman's Mill	Mackinaw City	Cheboygan	Northern Michigan	website, 625 acre state park with history and natural history exhibits
Drayton Plains Nature Center	Waterford	Oakland	Southeastern Michigan	website, 137 acres, operated by the town
Eddy Discovery Center	Chelsea	Jackson	Central Michigan	Located in Waterloo State Recreation Area, features exhibits on the geology, natural history and cultural history of Waterloo State Recreation Area, 21,000 acres
Farmington Hills Nature Center	Farmington Hills	Oakland	Southeastern Michigan	website, located in 211-acre Heritage Park, exhibits, backyard habitat bird viewing area, native fish aquariums, a nature library, hands-on tables, Discovery Cove, operated by the city
Fenner Nature Center	Lansing	Ingham	Central Michigan	website, 130 acres with 4 miles of trails
Fernwood Botanical Garden and Nature Preserve	Niles	Berrien	West Michigan	105 acre (42 ha) arboretum, botanical garden and nature preserve with a nature center
Flynn Township Nature Center	Flynn Township	Sanilac	The Thumb	Flynn Township Nature Center and Conservation/Game Area is open to the public and allows hunting, fishing, and other recreational activities.
For-Mar Nature Preserve and Arboretum	Burton	Genesee	Flint/Tri-Cities	website, operated by the county, 383 acres, 7 miles of hiking trails, gardens, education programs
Grass River Natural Area	Bellaire	Antrim	Northern Michigan	website, 1,443 acres, Grass River Center, managed by Grass River Natural Area, Inc.
Harris Nature Center	Okemos	Ingham	Central Michigan	website, operated by the town
Hartley Outdoor Education Center	St. Charles	Saginaw	Flint/Tri-Cities	300 acres, owned and operated by the Saginaw Intermediate School District
Hawk Woods Nature Center	Auburn Hills	Oakland	Southeastern Michigan	website, 80 acres, operated by the City
Hoffmaster State Park	Muskegon	Muskegon	West Michigan	Gillette Sand Dune Visitor Center features exhibits and programs about the dunes ecosystem
Howard Christensen Nature Center	Kent City	Kent	West Michigan	website, 130 acres, Red Pine Interpretive Center
Howell Nature Center	Howell	Livingston	Southeastern Michigan	website, about 300 acres, education, recreation and wildlife facility, residential and day programs
Hudson Mills Metropark	Ann Arbor	Washtenaw	Southeastern Michigan	1,549 acres, Activity Center features exhibits on butterflies, Hudson Mills history and tree identification, nature trails, programs
Huron County Nature Center	Port Austin	Huron	Flint/Tri-Cities	website, 280 acres
Indian Springs Metropark	White Lake	Oakland	Southeastern Michigan	2,215 acres park including the Environmental Discovery Center with an underwater pond viewing room
E. L. Johnson Nature Center	Bloomfield Hills	Oakland	Southeastern Michigan	website, 40 acres, over 2 miles of trails, visitor center with exhibits, 1800s homestead, operated by the school system
Kalamazoo Nature Center	Kalamazoo	Kalamazoo	West Michigan	website, 1,487 acres, over 14 miles of trails
Kensington Park Nature Center	Milford	Oakland	Southeastern Michigan	4,481 acres
Lake St. Clair Metropark	Harrison Township	Macomb	Southeastern Michigan	770 acres, nature center features live reptiles and amphibians, exhibits on Lake St. Clair, the wetlands, wildlife, and use of the area by French Voyageurs
Leslie Science & Nature Center	Ann Arbor	Washtenaw	Southeastern Michigan	website, animal house open on weekends, grounds, trails, and raptor enclosures open every day
Love Creek Nature Center	Berrien	Berrien	West Michigan	website, located in Love Creek County Park
Marshlands Museum and Nature Center	Brownstown	Wayne	Southeastern Michigan	Located in Lake Erie Metropark, natural and cultural history of Southeastern Michigan
MooseWood Nature Center	Marquette	Marquette	Upper Peninsula of Michigan	website, located in Presque Isle Park
Nankin Mills Nature Center	Westland	Wayne	Southeastern Michigan	Operated by the county in a historic grist mill
Nature Discovery	Williamston	Ingham	Central Michigan	website, features Michigan reptiles and amphibians
Nature Education Center at Hemlock Crossing Park	West Olive	Ottawa	West Michigan	website, 239 acres, exhibits, wildlife viewing area and a gift shop, operated by the County
Nichols Arboretum	Ann Arbor	Washtenaw	Southeastern Michigan	123 acres, operated by the University of Michigan, features the James D. Reader Jr. Urban Environmental Education Center in Washington Heights
Oakwoods Park Nature Center	Belleville	Wayne	Southeastern Michigan	1,756 acres, nature center features 700 gallon turtle tan, live snakes, frogs, toads, salamanders and fish on display
Outdoor Discovery Center Macatawa Greenway	Holland	Ottawa	West Michigan	website, 136 acre nature preserve, protects 1200 acres along the Macatawa River
Pierce Cedar Creek Institute	Hastings	Barry	West Michigan	website, 742 acres, mix between a nature center and biological field station
Pine River Nature Center	Goodells	St. Clair	Metro Detroit	website, Approximately 80 acres, focus is programs for area schools, owned and operated by the St. Clair County Regional Educational Service Agency. Universally Accessible Treehouse. Free.
Raven Hill Discovery Center	East Jordan	Charlevoix	Northern Michigan	Indoor and outdoor exhibits on science, nature, art and history, 157 acres
Red Oaks Nature Center	Madison Heights	Oakland	Southeastern Michigan	website, operated by the Fox Valley Parks District, located in the George W. Suarez Friendship Woods, formerly the Madison Heights Nature Center
Sarett Nature Center	Benton Harbor	Berrien	West Michigan	website, eight miles of trails through its 1000 acres
Seven Ponds Nature Center	Dryden	Lapeer	Flint/Tri-Cities	website, 468 acres on two sites
Stage Nature Center	Troy	Oakland	Southeastern Michigan	website, programs operated by the Troy Nature Society, 100 acres owned by the city
Sterling Heights Nature Center	Sterling Heights	Macomb	Southeastern Michigan	website, operated by the city
Stony Creek Metropark Nature Center	Shelby	Macomb	Southeastern Michigan	4,461-acre park with over 8 miles of trails, nature center features live displays, snakes, turtles and fish
Stubnitz Environmental Education Center	Adrian	Lenawee	Southeastern Michigan	website, operated by the Lenawee Intermediate School District, located in Heritage Park
Thorne Swift Nature Preserve	Harbor Springs	Emmet	Northern Michigan	website, 30 acres, includes the Elizabeth Kennedy Nature Center, operated by the Little Traverse Conservancy
Thurston Nature Center	Ann Arbor	Washtenaw	Southeastern Michigan	website, 20 acres including 7 acre pond, managed by a volunteer committee of Thurston Elementary School
University of Michigan-Dearborn Environmental Interpretive Center	Dearborn	Wayne	Southeastern Michigan	website, 300 acres, operated by the University of Michigan-Dearborn
Whitefish Point Bird Observatory	Paradise	Chippewa	Upper Peninsula of Michigan	Seasonal public programs
Whitehouse Nature Center	Albion	Calhoun	West Michigan	website, operated by Albion College, 135 acre outdoor education facility
Wint Nature Center	Clarkston	Oakland	Southeastern Michigan	website, operated by the County in 1,276-acre Independence Oaks Park
Wittenbach/Wege Environmental Center	Lowell	Kent	West Michigan	website, 140 acres, owned by Lowell School District, outdoor learning center, community garden
Woldumar Nature Center	Lansing	Eaton	Central Michigan	website, 178 acres, over 5 miles of trails, outreach and on-site Environmental Education programs for children as well as adults

== Resources ==
- Michigan Alliance for Environmental and Outdoor Education
