= List of nature centers in Alaska =

This is a list of nature centers and environmental education centers in the state of Alaska.

To use the sortable tables: click on the icons at the top of each column to sort that column in alphabetical order; click again for reverse alphabetical order.

Name	Location	Borough/Census Area	Region	Summary
Alaska Islands and Ocean Visitor Center	Homer	Kenai Peninsula	Southcentral Alaska	website, partnership of the Alaska Maritime National Wildlife Refuge and the Kachemak Bay National Estuarine Research Reserve, marine environment exhibits and art, education programs
Alaska Raptor Center	Sitka	Sitka	Southeast Alaska	17 acres, raptor rehabilitation and education center
American Bald Eagle Foundation	Haines	Haines	Southeast Alaska	Non-profit museum and raptor center
Campbell Creek Science Center	Anchorage	Anchorage	Southcentral Alaska	website, operated by the Bureau of Land Management in the 730-acre Campbell Tract, outdoor science education center
Center for Alaskan Coastal Studies	Homer	Kenai Peninsula	Southcentral Alaska	website, 140 acres, operates the Wynn Nature Center, open seasonally
Denali Education Center	Denali National Park and Preserve	Denali	Alaska Interior	website, 10-acre campus, just across the Nenana River from Denali National Park provides an ideal setting to learn about, and come to truly appreciate Alaska.
Discovery Southeast	Juneau	Juneau	Southeast Alaska	website, Environmental Education Center, "Deepening our Connection with Nature through Education and Exploration. Incorporated in 1989 as the “Alaska Discovery Foundation, Inc.” (EIN 92–0128339), for over 30 years we’ve introduced children and families to the outdoors, providing the foundation for lifelong interests, skills, and exploration. We promote a better understanding of ourselves, the natural world, and our place in it."
Eagle River Nature Center	Eagle River	Anchorage	Southcentral Alaska	Located within 495,204-acre Chugach State Park, operated by the Friends of Eagle River Nature Center
Juneau Raptor Center	Juneau	Juneau	Southeast Alaska	Raptor rehabilitation and education center
Mendenhall Glacier Visitor Center	Juneau	Juneau	Southeast Alaska	Located in the Tongass National Forest and operated by the United States Forest Service, interprets natural history of the Mendenhall Glacier landscape
Murie Science and Learning Center	Denali National Park and Preserve	Denali	Alaska Interior	Located in Denali National Park and Preserve, operated by the National Park Service and many partners, features exhibits, education programs and research
Prince William Sound Science Center	Cordova	Chugach	Southcentral Alaska	website, research and education programs about Prince William Sound and Copper River Delta ecosystems
Southeast Alaska Discover Center	Ketchikan	Ketchikan Gateway	Southeast Alaska	A visitor center for Tongass National Forest, provides interpretive exhibits and activities about the ecology, economy and culture of Southeast Alaska and its temperate rainforest ecosystems.
Tidelines Institute	Inian Islands	Hoonah-Angoon	Southeast Alaska	website, Educating a diverse generation of citizens, stewards, and leaders through immersive courses in the communities and wildlands of S’íx’ Tlein (Icy Strait) and Sít’ Eeti Gheeyí (Glacier Bay).
