= List of nature centers in Kentucky =

This is a list of nature centers and environmental education centers in the state of Kentucky.

To use the sortable tables: click on the icons at the top of each column to sort that column in alphabetical order; click again for reverse alphabetical order.

Name	Location	County	Region	Summary
Beckley Creek Park	Louisville	Jefferson	North Central	616 acres, includes the PNC Achievement Center for Education and Interpretation, operated by The Parklands of Floyds Fork
Berea College Forestry Outreach Center	Berea	Madison	East Central	website, The Pinnacles hiking trails, education center, operated by Berea College which owns over 9,000 acres of forest land
Bernheim Arboretum and Research Forest	Clermont	Bullitt	North Central	14,000-acre arboretum, forest, and nature preserve, education center, art gallery, 35 miles of trails
Blackacre State Nature Preserve	Louisville	Jefferson	North Central	170 acre farm, trails, 19th century homestead, environmental education programs
Central Kentucky Wildlife Refuge	Danville	Boyle	Bluegrass	website, 500 acres, features the Mary Ashby Cheek Nature Center
Clay Hill Memorial Forest	Campbellsville	Taylor	South Central Kentucky	website, 158-acre educational and research woodland that is managed by Campbellsville University as a regional center for environmental education
Clyde E. Buckley Wildlife Sanctuary & Life Adventure Center	Frankfort	Franklin	Bluegrass	website, 374 acres, operated by the Central Kentucky Audubon Society
Creasey Mahan Nature Preserve	Goshen	Oldham	North Central	website, 168 acres, exhibits include ecosystem dioramas, Native American life, Kentucky fish, natural history learning areas
Floracliff Nature Sanctuary	Lexington	Fayette	Bluegrass	website, 287 acres, located in the Kentucky River Palisades, managed by an independent board in conjunction with the Kentucky State Nature Preserves Commission, features the Winifred W. Haggart Nature Center
Fort Wright Nature Center	Fort Wright	Kenton	Northern Kentucky	website, 13 acre park, operated by the city
Gladie Visitor Center	Stanton	Powell	Central	website, cultural heritage, natural history and geology of the Red River Gorge Geological Area and Clifty Wilderness in the Daniel Boone National Forest
Jenny Wiley State Resort Park	Prestonsburg	Floyd	Eastern	2,871 acres, includes a nature center
Joe Ford Nature Center	Owensboro	Daviess	Western	website, 14 acres, operated by the city
John James Audubon State Park	Henderson	Henderson	Western	About 700 acres, features the Audubon Museum, with exhibits about John James Audubon's life and art and a nature center with hands-on exhibits
Land Between the Lakes Woodlands Nature Station		Trigg	Western	Outdoor native wildlife enclosures and native plant trails, indoor exhibits, programs, website
Lost River Cave	Bowling Green	Warren	South Central Kentucky	cave tours by boat, 68 acres with 3 miles of trails, nature center
Louisville Nature Center	Louisville	Jefferson	North Central	41 acres in Beargrass Creek State Nature Preserve
Mary E. Fritsch Nature Center	Livingston	Rockcastle	South Central Kentucky	website, operated by Appalachia-Science in the Public Interest
Natural Bridge State Resort Park	Slade	Powell	Central	2,200 acre forested park and nature preserve with 22 miles of trails, a 60-acre lake, nature center
Pine Mountain State Resort Park	Pineville	Bell	Southeast	1,159 acres, includes the Pine Mountain Interpretive Center, golf course and mini golf
Raven Run Nature Sanctuary	Lexington	Fayette	Bluegrass	website, 734 acres, over 10 miles of trails, nature center, operated by the city
Salato Wildlife Education Center	Frankfort	Franklin	Bluegrass	website, operated by the Kentucky Department of Fish and Wildlife Resources, includes indoor exhibits and outdoor trails with native wildlife on display, 262 acres, 4 miles of trails
Toyota Environmental Education Center	Georgetown	Scott	North Central	website, operated by Toyota Motor Manufacturing Kentucky, park with 1 mile trail, education programs
Wolf Creek National Fish Hatchery	Jamestown	Russell	South Central Kentucky	Features a visitor/environmental center, exhibits about fish, natural history and the environment

== Resources ==
- Kentucky Association for Environmental Education
