= Melanonotus =

Scientific classification
- Kingdom: Animalia
- Phylum: Arthropoda
- Clade: Pancrustacea
- Class: Insecta
- Order: Orthoptera
- Suborder: Ensifera
- Family: Tettigoniidae
- Subfamily: Pseudophyllinae
- Tribe: Cocconotini
- Genus: Melanonotus; Brunner von Wattenwyl, 1895

Species
- See text

Genus of katydids

Melanonotus is a genus of katydid insects in the family Tettigoniidae.

== Species ==
- Melanonotus aterrimus Beier, 1960
- Melanonotus atratus Beier, 1960
- Melanonotus atrogeniculatus Beier, 1960
- Melanonotus bradleyi (Hebard, 1927)
- Melanonotus constrictus (Brunner von Wattenwyl, 1895)
- Melanonotus frontalis Beier, 1960
- Melanonotus globosus (Brunner von Wattenwyl, 1895)
- Melanonotus lativittatus (Walker, 1870)
- Melanonotus peruvianus (Caudell, 1913)
- Melanonotus powellorum Rentz, 1975
- Melanonotus pulcher (Brunner von Wattenwyl, 1895)
- Melanonotus septentrionalis Mariño & Márquez Mayaudón, 1984
- Melanonotus tico Rentz, 1975
- Melanonotus variabilis (Caudell, 1918)
