= Salburua =

Wetland in Vitoria-Gasteiz, Basque Country, Spain

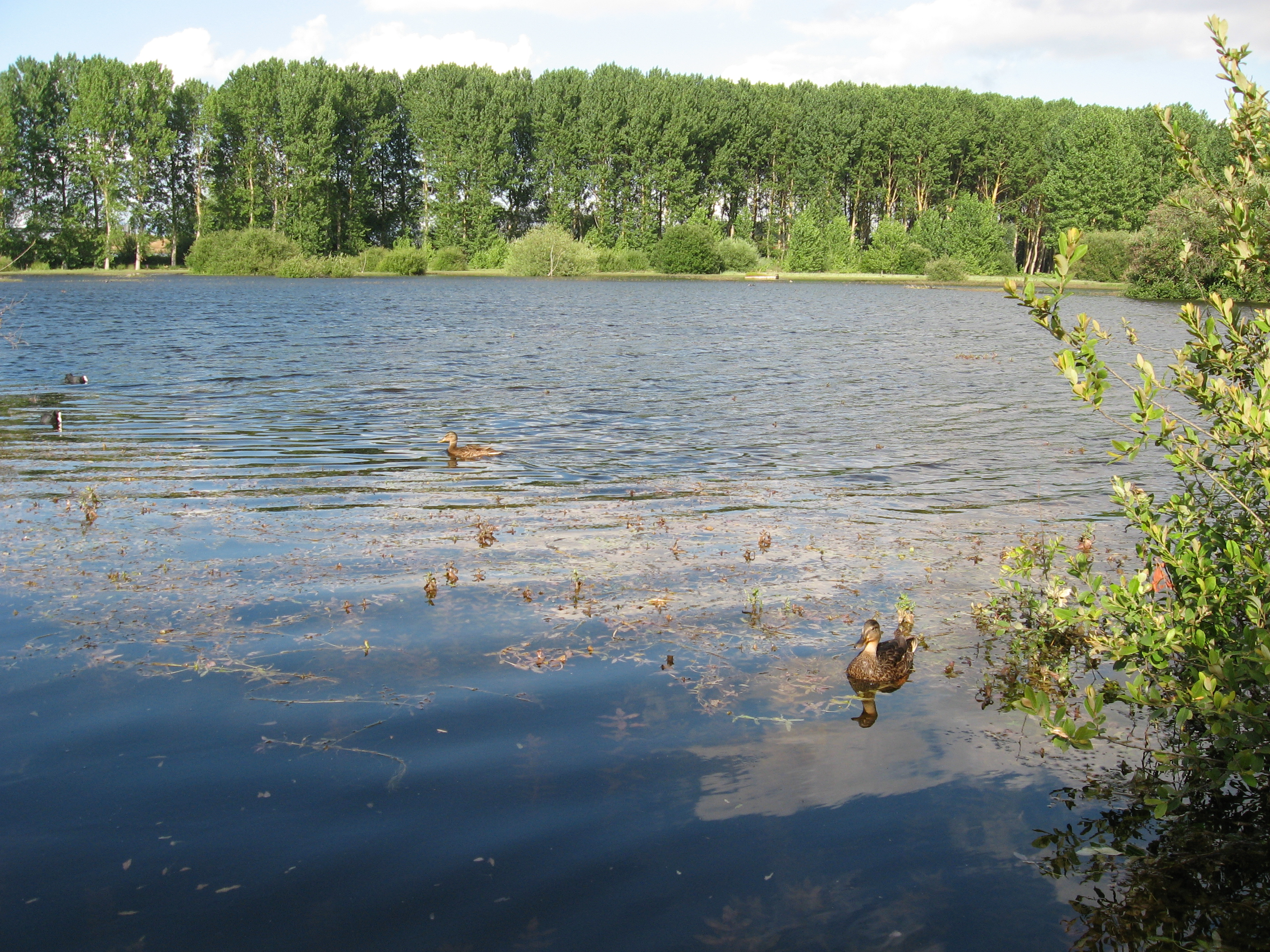
- A view of one of the lagoons

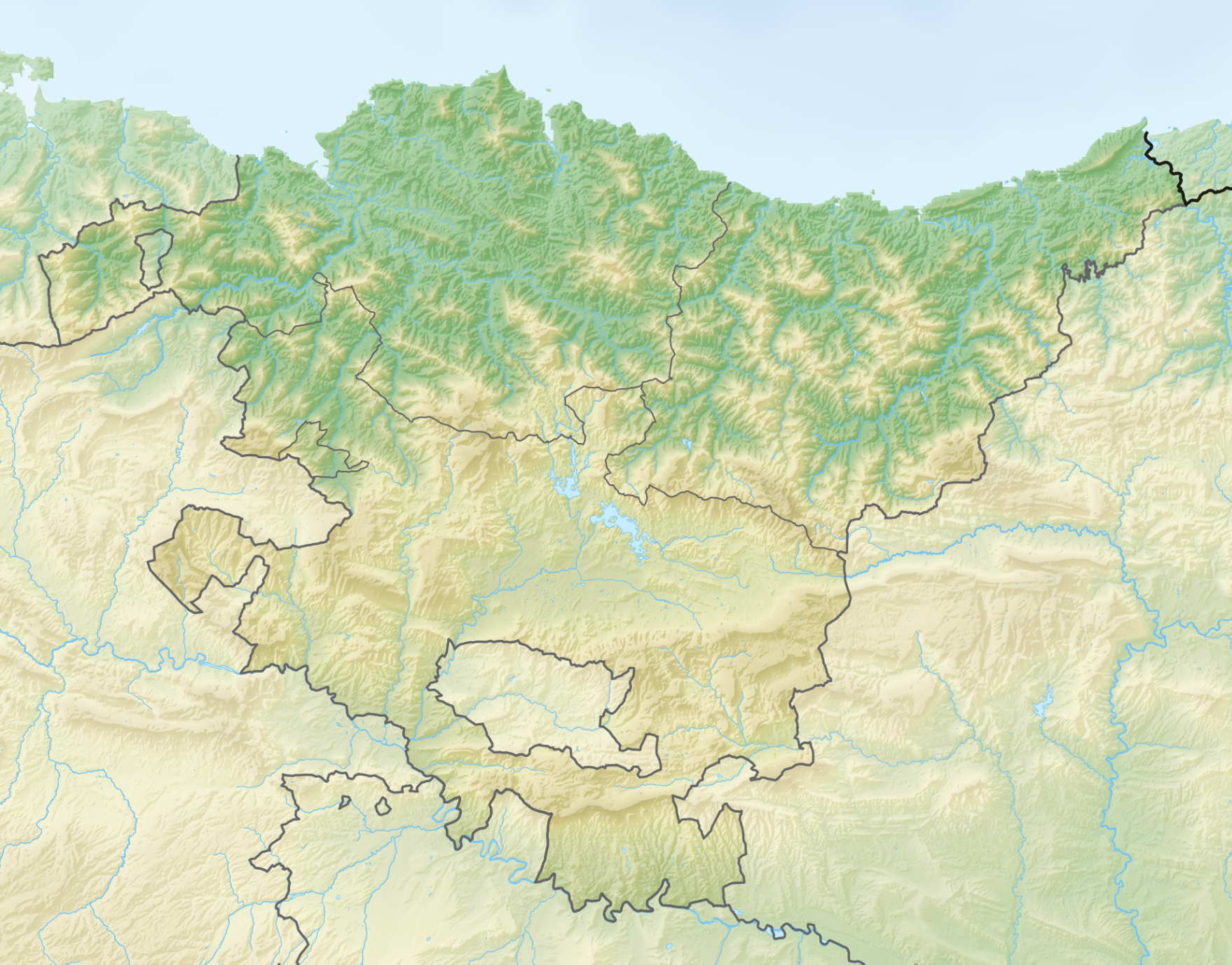
- Location within the Basque Country Location within Spain
- Location: Basque Country, Spain
- Nearest city: Vitoria-Gasteiz
- Coordinates: 42°51′10″N 2°39′05″W
- Area: 160 hectares (400 acres)
- Established: 1992
- Visitors: 125000 (in 2002)
- Governing body: Vitoria-Gasteiz City Council
- Website: Salburua, website of the Vitoria-Gasteiz City Council

Ramsar Wetland
- Designated: 24 October 2002
- Reference no.: 1263
- Area: 174 ha (430 acres)

Natura 2000 site (SAC)
- Designated: June 2015
- Reference no.: ES2110014
- Area: 2.17 km^{2} (0.84 sq mi)

Salburua is a wetland habitat on the eastern outskirts of the city of Vitoria-Gasteiz in the Basque Country in Spain. The area, which is part of the city green belt, contains lakes, meadows and oak groves. It was drained in the 19th century to transform the area into farmland. Restoration work started in 1994 and has reversed this situation and now Salburua is a Ramsar Wetland of International Importance. The Salburua marshes are considered to be "the Basque country's most valuable area of wetland", according to a Fedenatur report for the European Commission in 2004.

== History ==
Before 1857, the Salburua wetlands had at least three lakes: Betoño, Larregana, and Arcaute. The grazing, hunting and fishing were well known throughout Basque Country. Around Arcaute lake was an oak forest landscape characteristic of the Plains of Alava. In 1857, a process of draining the lakes and forest clearance was initiated with the aim of producing valuable agricultural land. This process continued into the 20th century when the last lake, Betoño, was drained.

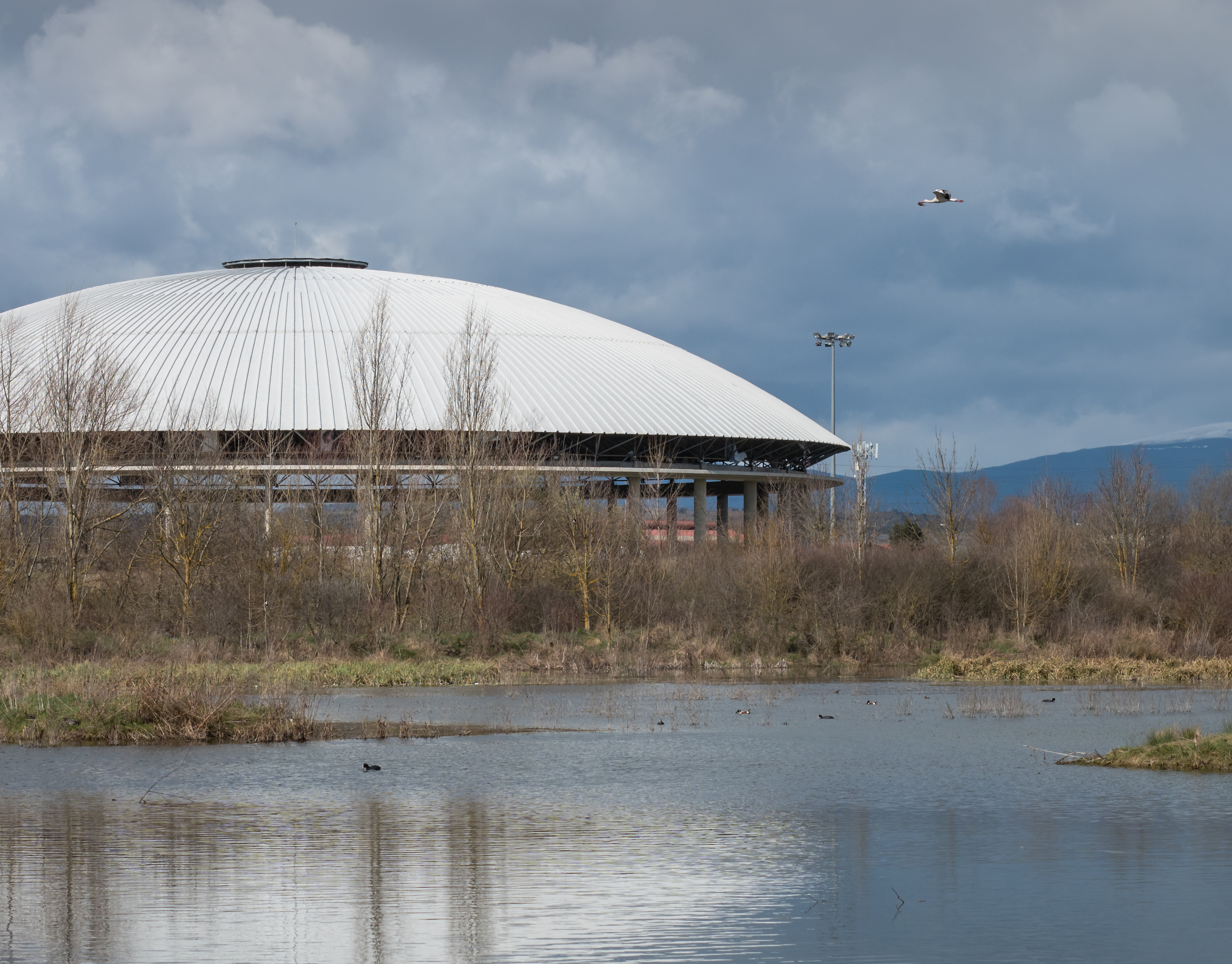
The wetlands nowadays

Work began in 1994 on the recovery of the ancient landscape. At that time there was only a remnant of forest, north of Elorriaga, and a small wet patch near Betoño, in which the last animals and plants characteristic of these environments barely survived. Negative impacts on the area were included poaching, slums, and waste disposal. Ecological restoration work began with the reversal of the drainage of Lake Betoño. In 1998 a dam was built in the Canal de la Balsa to help this process. Through these activities it has been possible to recover an area of more than 180 hectares (440 acres), of which, at times of maximum flooding, 60 hectares (150 acres) are covered by water.

The restoration of Salburua serves as protection against flooding in the city of Vitoria-Gasteiz, which uses the lagoons and ponds. Since 1994 restoration work and landscaping in the vicinity of the lakes, and along water courses, have helped to recover some of the original wealth of Salburua. In addition to the ecological recovery, walkways, paths and bird hides have been provided.

== Ataria wetlands interpretation centre ==
An interpretation and information centre, Ataria, was opened in 2009. The facilities include an exhibition area, a café, auditorium and a cantilevered observation deck, which extends over a lagoon.

== Biodiversity ==
The flora includes a mass of well-preserved Carex riparia and other aquatic flora. Invertebrates include carabid beetles in different species with at least two endemic types. Small mammals include the European mink which is an endangered species. There is also a wide variety of amphibians. At present the greatest threat to these species is the arrival of invasive species. Large numbers of birds use the wetlands for breeding or wintering. The INBIOS Project aims to improve populations of threatened species: bats, sand martins, waders, herons and otters; improve the conservation status of habitats, especially aquatic vegetation and the edges of ponds; combating invasive alien species of fauna, fish and American freshwater crayfish. Another objective is to conduct the first pilot project of reintroduction of European mink in the river ecosystems of northern Spain.

=== Flora ===
Although the most spectacular sight are the animals, Salburua also hosts a variety of vegetation, especially wetland species. Many of these species have managed to revive after the revitalization of wetlands. There are up to about thirty-five different species, including marshmallow, aconite, sedges and orchids.

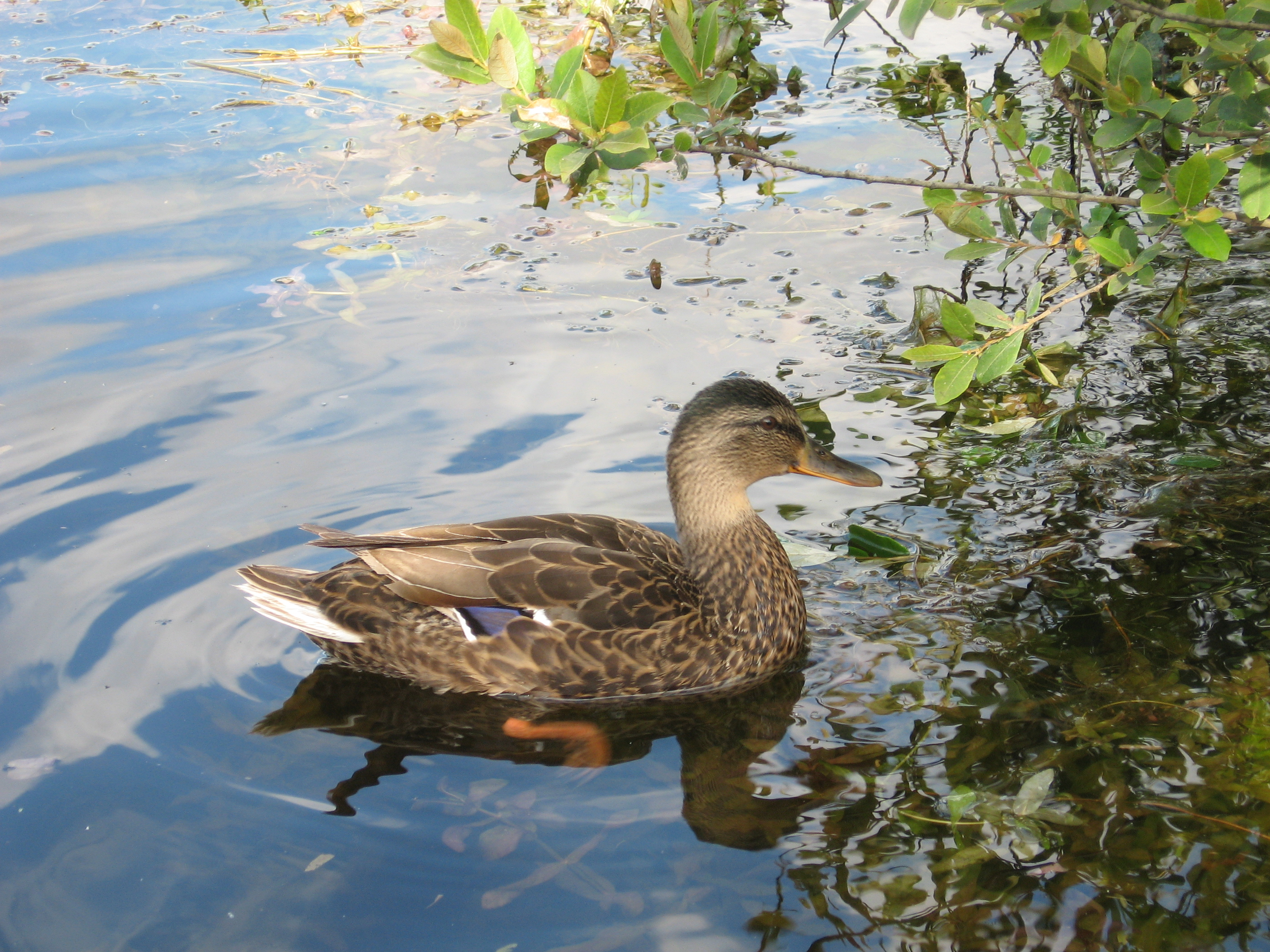

=== Fauna ===
Apart from a herd of deer, introduced artificially to the marsh for vegetation control, all the wildlife that lives in the wetland is of wild origin. One of the most important carabid beetle communities of the Iberian Peninsula is present as well as one of the most comprehensive communities of amphibians and reptiles of the Basque Country. The strategic location on migration paths enables thousands of birds to visit by Salburua. Some of them are in the area through the winter and even choose these ponds for breeding, one of the world's most endangered carnivores, the European mink has been re-introduced.

== Urbanization ==
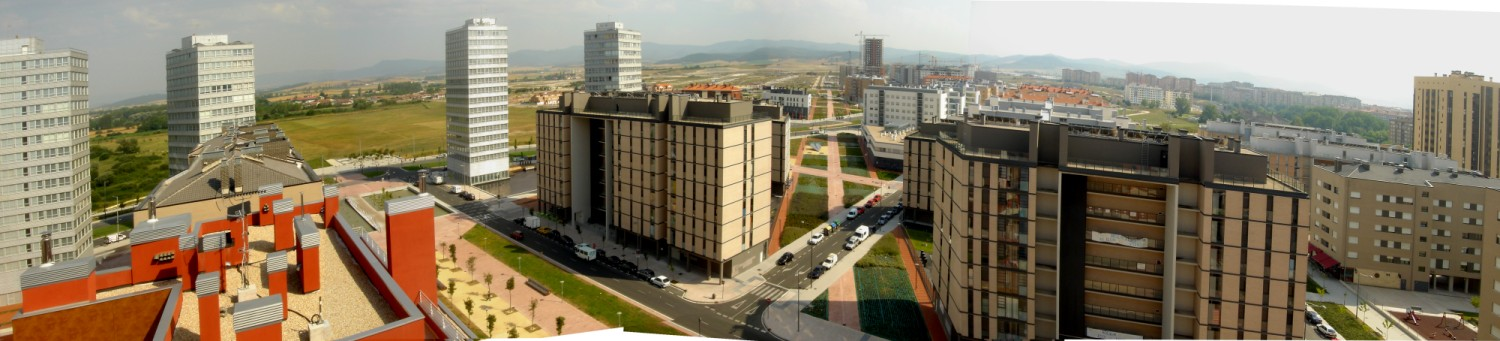
Urbanization in Salburua

The wetlands are bordered by a large residential district of Vitoria-Gasteiz, which is still under development as of 2012. The northern part includes high bioclimatic towers and apartment blocks of 4-6 stories high. The runway of the former city airport, located right in the middle of the development, has become an avenue. It is a low density place and has approximately 7,000 residents. The Santo Tomas district is still under construction and will eventually have half of the population of the district, with about 16,000 inhabitants. The "Gateway of Arkay" will join the municipal boundaries and include the towns of Elorriaga and Arkay. Its development began in mid-2010.
