= Selvatura Park =

Nature center in Costa Rica

Selvatura Adventure Park
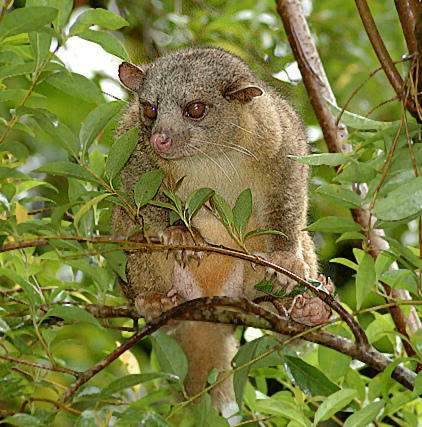
- Bushy tailed olingo within the Hummingbird Gallery
- Interactive map of Selvatura Adventure Park
- Type: Urban park. Zoo, Botanical Garden.
- Location: Puntarenas Province, Costa Rica
- Coordinates: 10°20′36″N 84°47′36″W
- Area: 486 hectares (1,200 acres)
- Status: Open all year

The Selvatura Adventure Park, or Monteverde Nature Center, Sloth habitat and Butterfly Gardens is a nature center in Monteverde, northwestern Puntarenas Province, Costa Rica. It is located in the Cordillera de Tilarán mountain range, close to the village of Santa Elena.

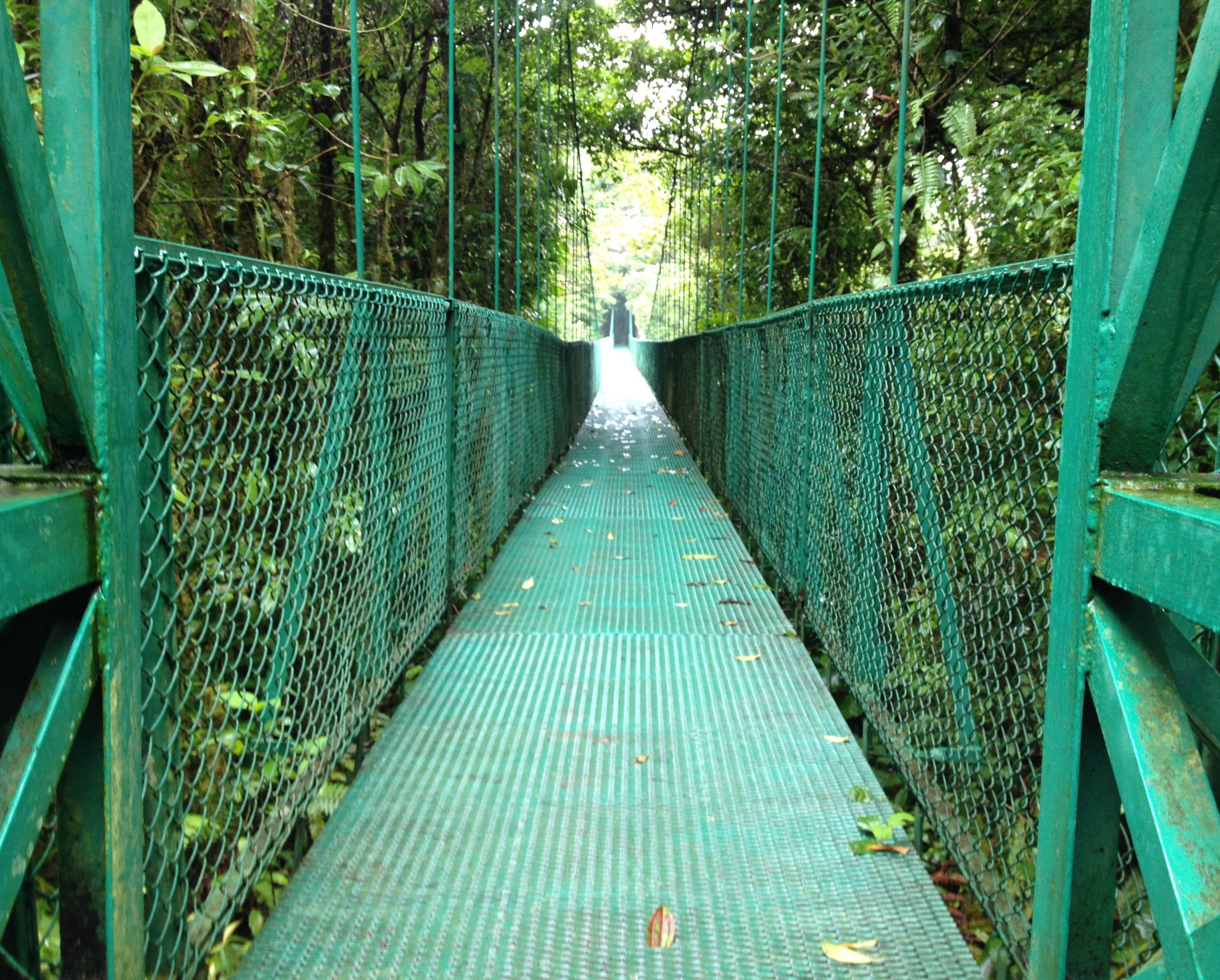
Suspension bridge within the treetop walkways

== See also ==
- Monteverde Cloud Forest Reserve — adjacent.
- List of zoos by country: Costa Rica zoos
