= Ataria =

Ataria Interpretation Centre
- Ataria – Centro de Interpretación de la Naturaleza de Salburúa
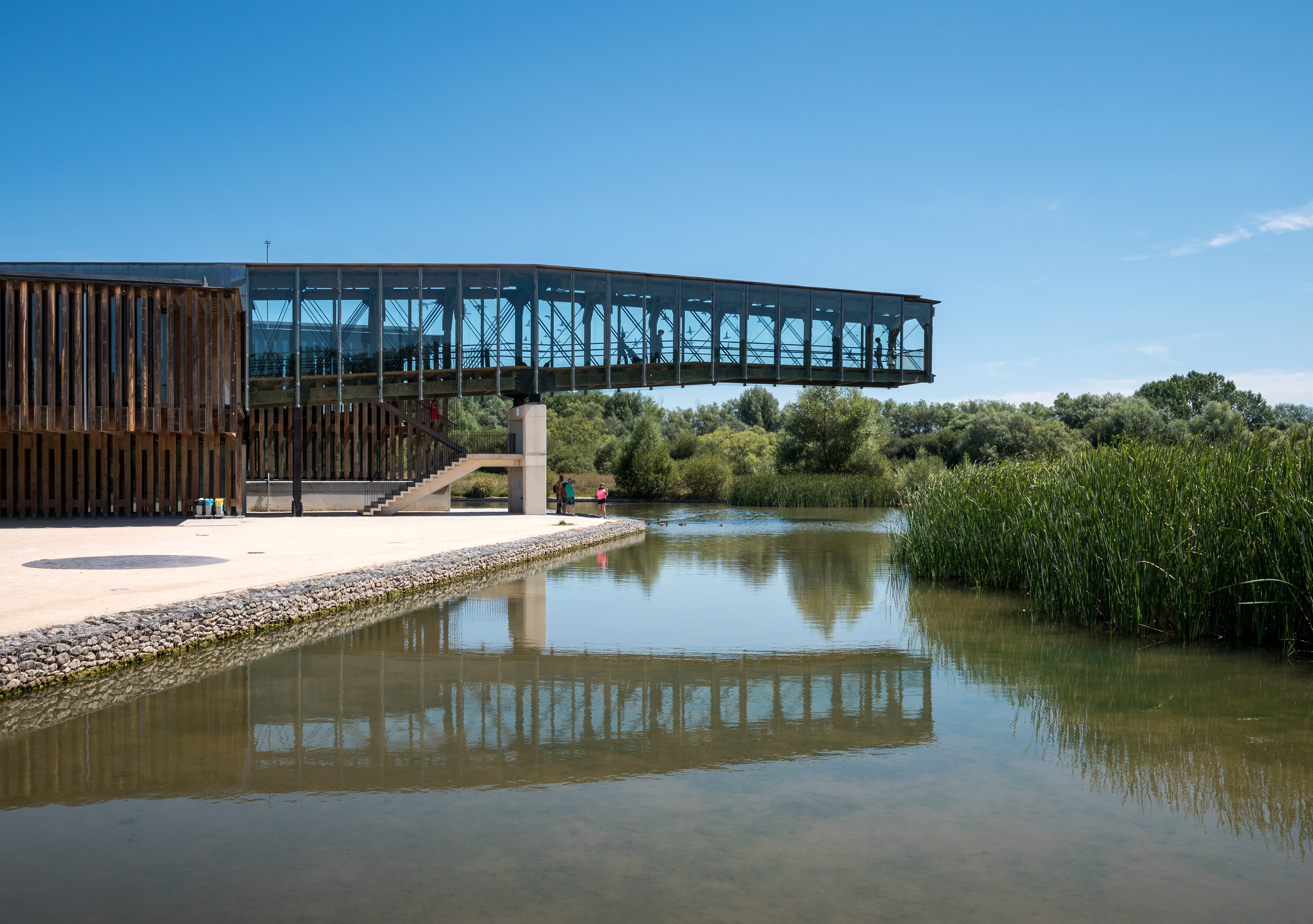
- Ataria wetlands interpretation centre

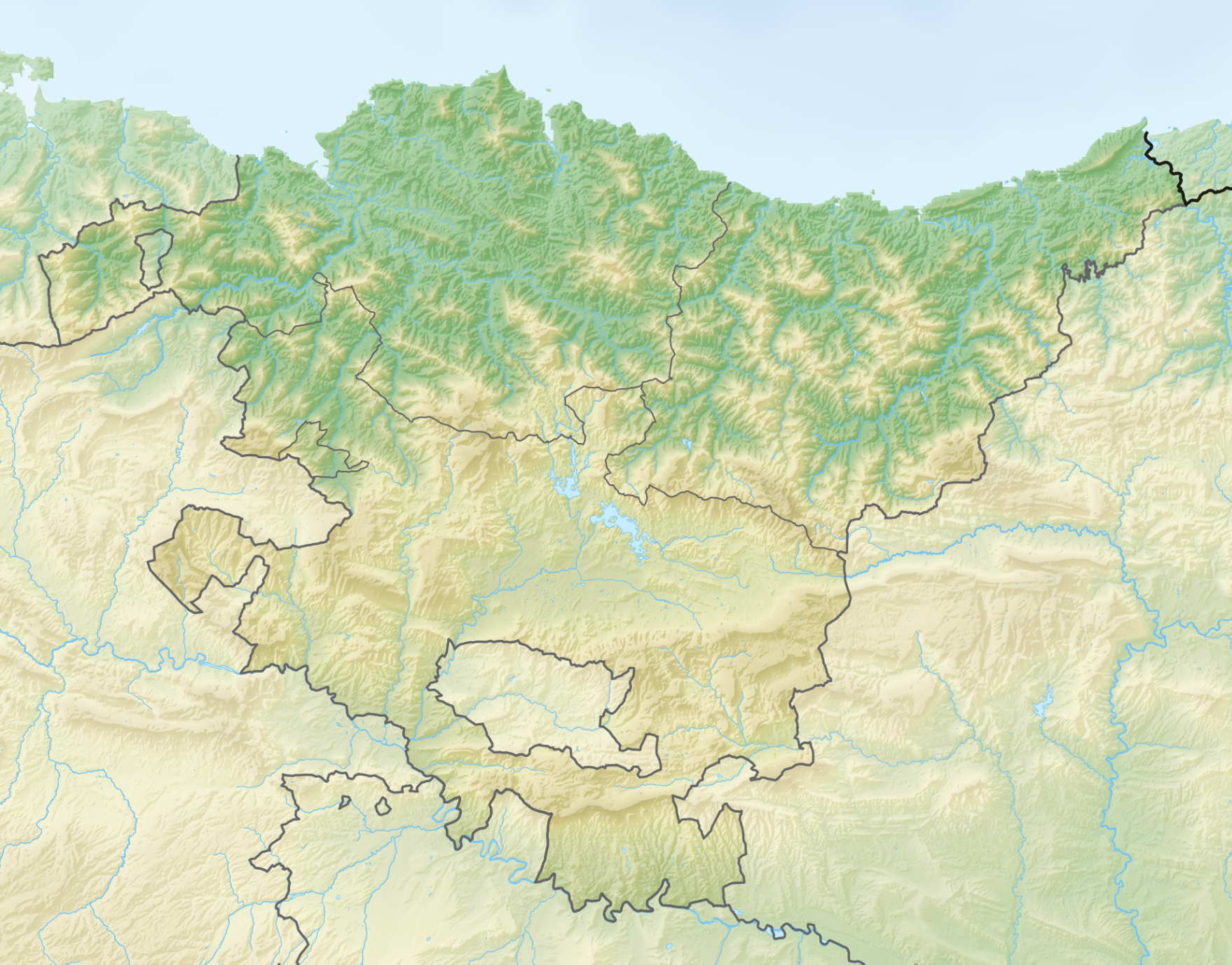
- Location within the Basque Country
- Interactive map of Ataria Interpretation Centre
- Nearest city: Vitoria-Gasteiz
- Coordinates: 42°51′36.81″N 2°38′32.22″W
- Created: 2009
- Designer: QVE Arquitectos
- Operator: Ayuntamiento de Vitoria-Gasteiz
- Visitors: 100,000 (in July 2009 - June 2010)
- Open: 10:00-14:00, 16:00-19:00 (winter); 10:00-14:00, 16:00-20:00 (summer)
- Website: Official website

Ramsar Wetland
- Official name: Salburua
- Designated: 24 October 2002
- Reference no.: 1263

Ataria Interpretation Centre (Basque: Ataria – Salburuako Natura Interpretaziorako Zentroa) is a wetlands interpretation centre and natural history museum for the Salburua wetlands, a Ramsar site and a significant wetlands habitat in the Basque Autonomous Community. The wetlands region is an important green belt on the eastern outskirts of the city of Vitoria - Gasteiz in Álava-Araba province. Ataria showcases the value of the wetlands, which are classified as a class 1 Habitat of European Community Interest, and the importance of biodiversity to Vitoria-Gasteiz's natural heritage. The Salburua marshes are considered to be "the Basque country's most valuable area of wetland", according to a Fedenatur report for the European Commission in 2004.

== Features ==
The centre complex was officially opened in July 2009, after three years of construction, at a cost of just under €7 million.

=== Building ===
The contemporary building was designed by QVE Arquitectos of Madrid, Spain. It was shortlisted for the World Architecture Festival in 2008 and nominated for the "Mies Arch Award" in 2009. Its construction is considered unique in that the building extends over the wetlands it examines. 100,000 visits to the centre were recorded in the first year of operation.

The building houses an auditorium, interactive exhibits, classrooms and laboratories for educational use, a café, and offices for the Vitoria-Gasteiz Centre for Environmental Studies.

=== Observation deck ===
A cantilevered observation deck, 19.2 metres (63 ft) long, allows visitors to look out over the marshlands. The enclosed walkway deck was constructed of laminated veneer lumber and steel bar trusses. Concrete and steel anchors transfer the force to the ground. The structure was described as "singular" in a paper by Professor J. L. Fernández-Cabo, who compared it to the large cantilevered timber roof of a pavilion at Hanover fairgrounds.

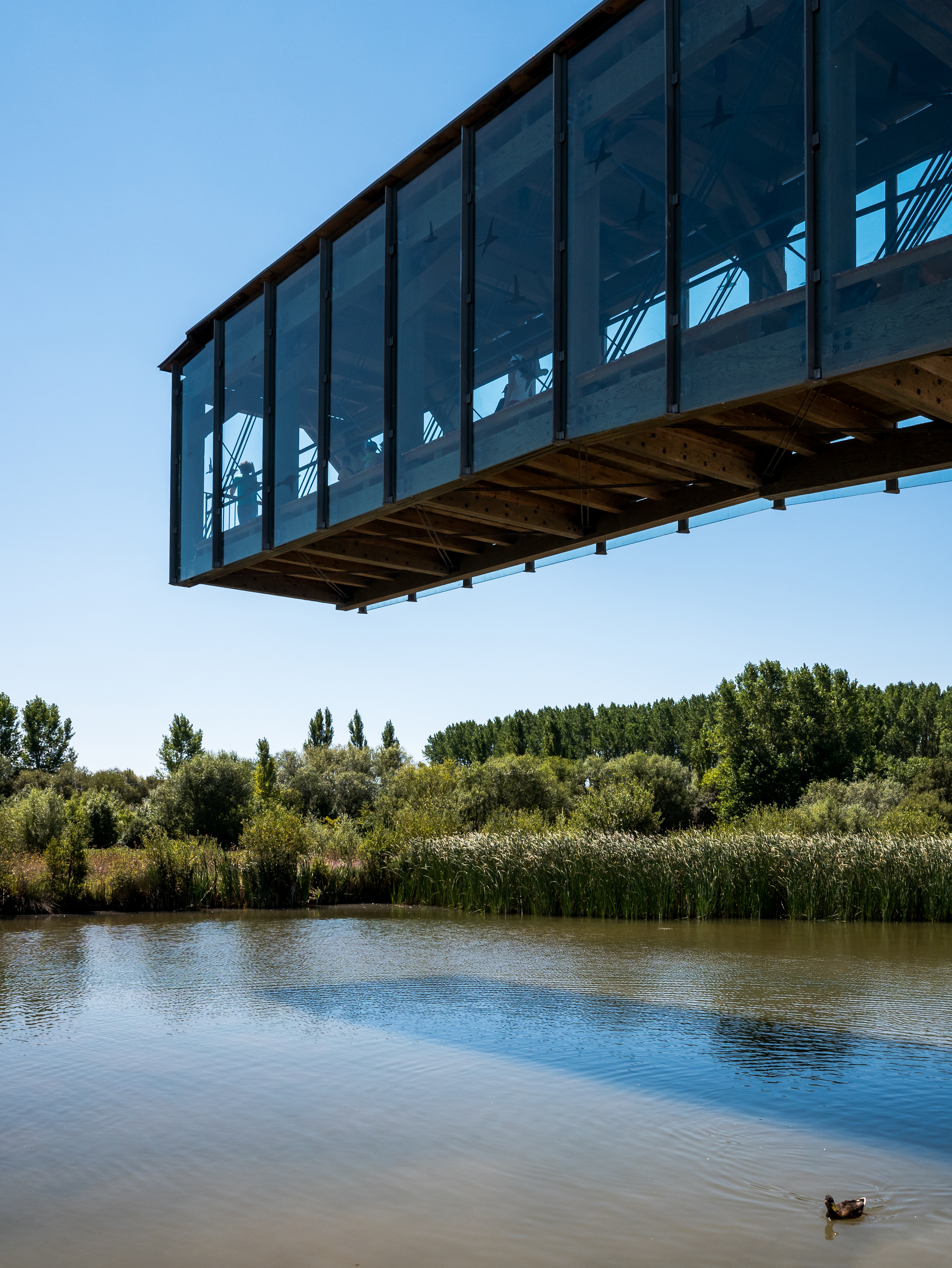
Cantilevered observation deck over the Salburua wetlands.
