= Monteverde Cloud Forest Reserve =

Forest reserve in Costa Rica

- Reserva Biológica Bosque Nuboso Monteverde
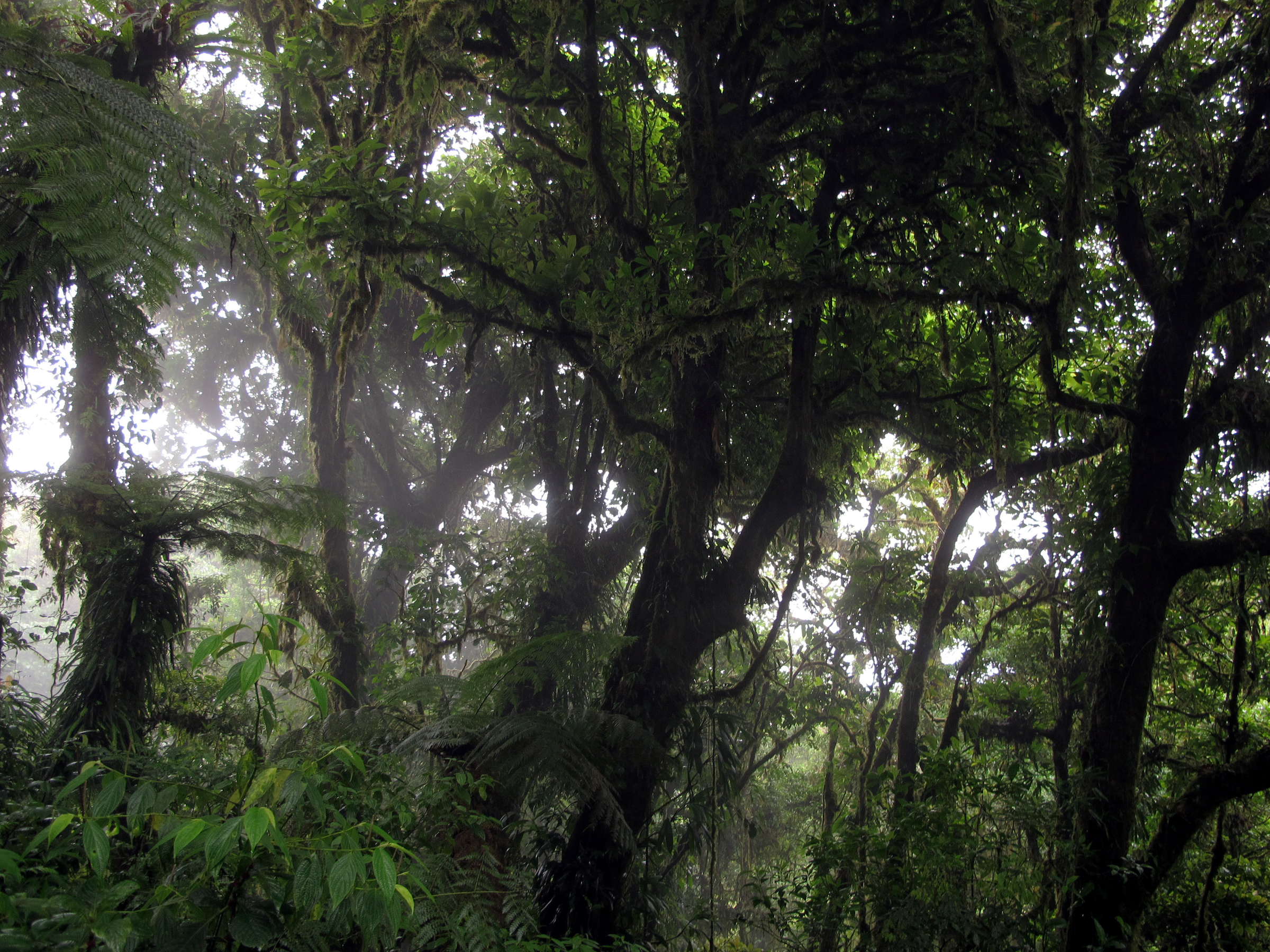
- Monteverde Cloud Forest Reserve

- Location within Costa Rica
- Location: Puntarenas and Alajuela, Costa Rica
- Nearest city: Monteverde
- Coordinates: 10°18′09″N 84°47′44″W
- Area: 10,500 ha (26,000 acres)
- Established: 1973

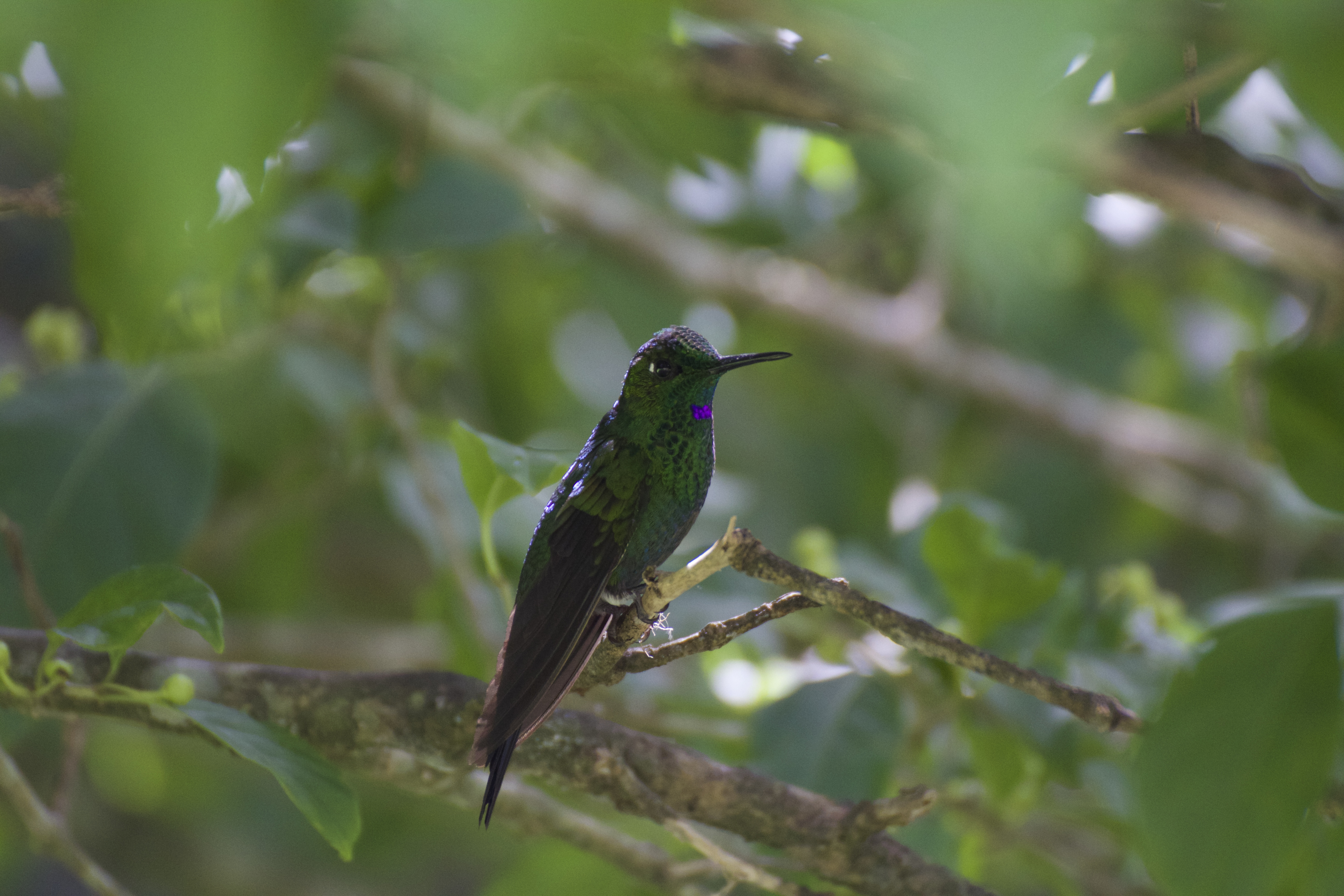
A green-crowned brilliant in the Monteverde Cloud Forest

The Monteverde Cloud Forest Reserve (Spanish: Reserva Biológica Bosque Nuboso Monteverde) is a Costa Rican reserve located along the Cordillera de Tilarán within the Puntarenas and Alajuela provinces. Named after the nearby town of Monteverde and founded in 1972, the Reserve consists of over 10,500 hectares (26,000 acres) of cloud forest. It draws roughly 70,000 visitors a year. The reserve consists of six life zones, 90% of which are virgin forest. A high biodiversity area, consisting of over 2,500 plant species (including the most orchid species in a single place), 100 species of mammals, 400 bird species, 120 reptilian and amphibian species, and thousands of insects, has drawn both scientists and tourists alike.

== History ==
=== 1950s: Arrival of farmers in the area ===
In 1951, several dozen Quakers (from 11 families) from Alabama seeking to live as farmers moved to and purchased land in Costa Rica. This was primarily to avoid the Korean War draft, an obligation which contradicted Quaker pacifist ideology. They chose Costa Rica because it had abolished its army just three years earlier. It was the Quakers who named the place Monteverde ("Green Mountain"), for round-the-year green plants.

=== 1960s: Attention from biologists ===
Biologists began to take note of Monteverde in the 1960s. Despite the lack of infrastructure and shelter with which to conduct scientific research, these original biologists not only have been continuously documenting, but continue to live in, Monteverde.

In 1968, Joseph Tosi, who worked for the Tropical Science Center, a foundation for tropical conservation, accompanied Leslie Holdridge on a journey to Monteverde. The visit was part of a study of the northern region of Costa Rica, requested by the government's National Planning Office. There, they met Hubert Mendenhall, leader of the Quaker community at the time, who took them to see the primary forests that surrounded the community.

At the end of their visit, Holdridge and Tosi recommended to the Quaker community that the native forests be preserved as much as possible in order to protect their water sources and, given the strong winds that swept though the area, to use the forests as windbreakers to protect their fields and homes.

=== 1970s: Mounting conservation efforts ===
In 1972, a young graduate student, George Powell, visited the Tropical Science Center (TSC) in San José. He lived in Monteverde while doing doctoral research on the birds of the area, and he found that the fauna and habitats were ideal for research purposes.

Amazed by the extraordinary biological richness of the cloud forests, including the habitat of the endemic golden toad, and alarmed by the depredation caused by hunters and land squatters, Powell received a promise from the Guacimal Land Company that they would donate 328 hectares (810 acres) of land, if he could form or find a civic association that would sponsor him in taking over the property. George used his personal funds to buy out several of the squatters, hoping to establish a small biological preserve in the region.

At the time, there were few national parks in Costa Rica, and the TSC had a program to create private preserves for research and biological education, where each preserve would represent a different ecological area of the country. Immediately, the TSC became interested in Powell's offer and started the process that led to the acquisition of the 328 hectares (810 acres) in April 1973. The cost of the farm was a symbolic 1 colón (less than USD $1).

Along with Powell, Costa Rican biologist Adelaida Chaverri and wildlife specialist Christopher Vaughn promoted the establishment of this private preserve, at the time a less-than-popular idea. In fact, Adelaida Chaverri became one of the sponsors, along with Joseph Tosi and other TSC members, of what is today the Monteverde Cloud Forest Reserve. They provided continuity to the interest expressed by George Powell when he obtained the donation of the first piece of land for the Reserve.

In 1975, 431 visitors came to the budding preserve, most of them scientists and bird watchers. Two years later, there still was no lodging available for visitors to the community, but Wood, a local Quaker, started a small bed-and-breakfast in her own home, where occasional visitors would stay overnight.

=== 1980s: First days of tourism ===
The number of foreign visitors increased from 2,700 in 1980 to more than 40,000 in 1991. The preserve increased in size during these years, but its best-known endemic species, the golden toad, as well as 40% of Monteverde's amphibian population became extinct, due to a deadly fungal pandemic chytridiomycosis.

=== 1990s–present ===
Currently the Reserve is visited by more than 70,000 people each year.

== Biology ==
=== Flora ===
Epiphytes, which make up 29% of the flora with 878 species, are the richest life form among species of flora in Monteverde. The Monteverde region is also known as the site with the largest number of orchids in the world. The total number of known species surpasses 500, and of these, 34 species discovered in the Reserve were new to science at the time of their discovery.

=== Fauna ===
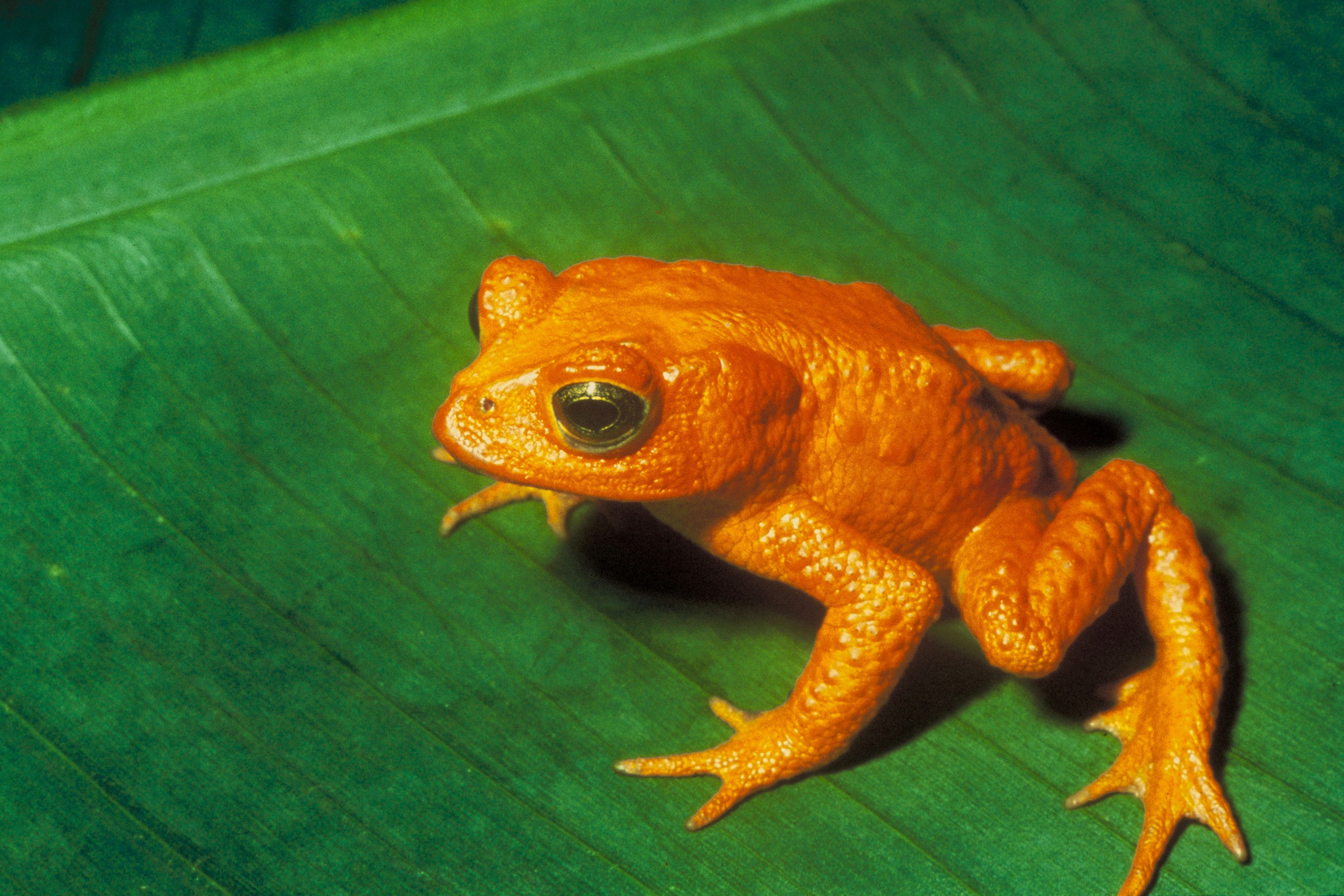
Monteverde's extinct golden toad.

Herpetofauna of the area is worth noting, with 161 species of amphibians and reptiles. Monteverde is known worldwide as the habitat of the golden toad (Incilius periglenes), a species that disappeared in 1989.

91 (21%) of Monteverde's bird species are long distance migratory birds, which reproduce in North America and pass through Monteverde during their migration or spend the winter in the area. Three of these species, the swallow-tailed kite (Elanoides forficatus), the piratic flycatcher (Legatus leucophaius), and the yellow-green vireo (Vireo flavoviridis), reproduce in Monteverde and migrate to South America during their non-reproductive phase.

The resplendent quetzal (Pharomachrus mocinno) moves seasonally from high elevation nesting sites to lower elevations on both sides of the Continental Divide. The beginning of the migration of the three-wattled bellbird (Procnias tricarunculata) is similar to that of the quetzal, with reproduction occurring close to the Continental Divide, from March to June, and followed by a post-reproductive move downhill on the Pacific slope during the months of August and September.

The majority of the bird species in Monteverde are primarily insectivores, given that the plants in the region offer a wide variety of fruit. The epiphytes are important resources both for frugivores and insectivores in Monteverde. On a global scale, the cloud forests of Monteverde are home to ten species of birds that are considered to be endangered by the organization Birdlife International, due to their very restricted habitat worldwide.

The mammals of Monteverde include representatives from both North and South America as endemic species. The mammalian fauna of the region includes six species of marsupials, three muskrats, at least 58 bats, three primates, seven edentates, two rabbits, one ground hog, three species of squirrels, one species of spiny mouse, at least 15 species of long-tailed rats and mice (family Muridae); one species of porcupine, one species of agouti, one paca, two canids, five mustelids, four procyonids, six felines, two species of wild pigs, two species of deer, and one tapir.

== Facilities ==
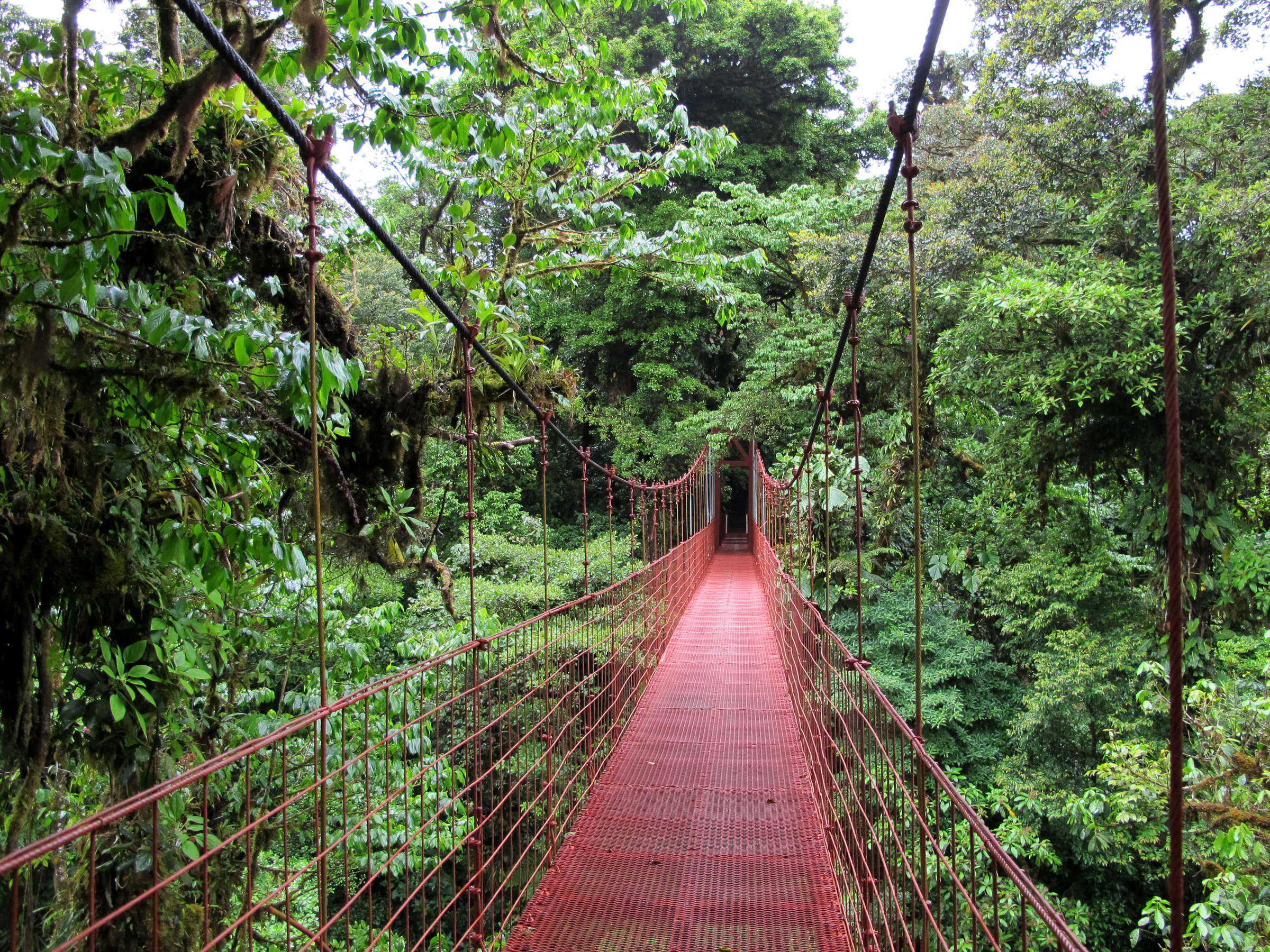
Suspension bridge in the reserve.

Currently, the Reserve has bus service that runs five times per day from Monteverde and Santa Elena; it also has a lodge that hosts up to 47 visitors, a small restaurant, a gift shop, and the Monteverde Nature Center information center, serpentarium, frog pond, bat jungle, and butterfly gardens. There are well-maintained trails that run through the reserve, as well as suspension bridges and zip-lines. Horseback tours are sometimes arranged.
