= Pro Natura (Switzerland) =

Swiss environmental group

- (in German) Schweizerischen Bund für Naturschutz (in French) Ligue suisse pour la protection de la nature (in Italian) Lega svizzera per la protezione della natura (in Romansh) Lia svizra per la protecziun da la natira (in English) Swiss League for the Protection of Nature
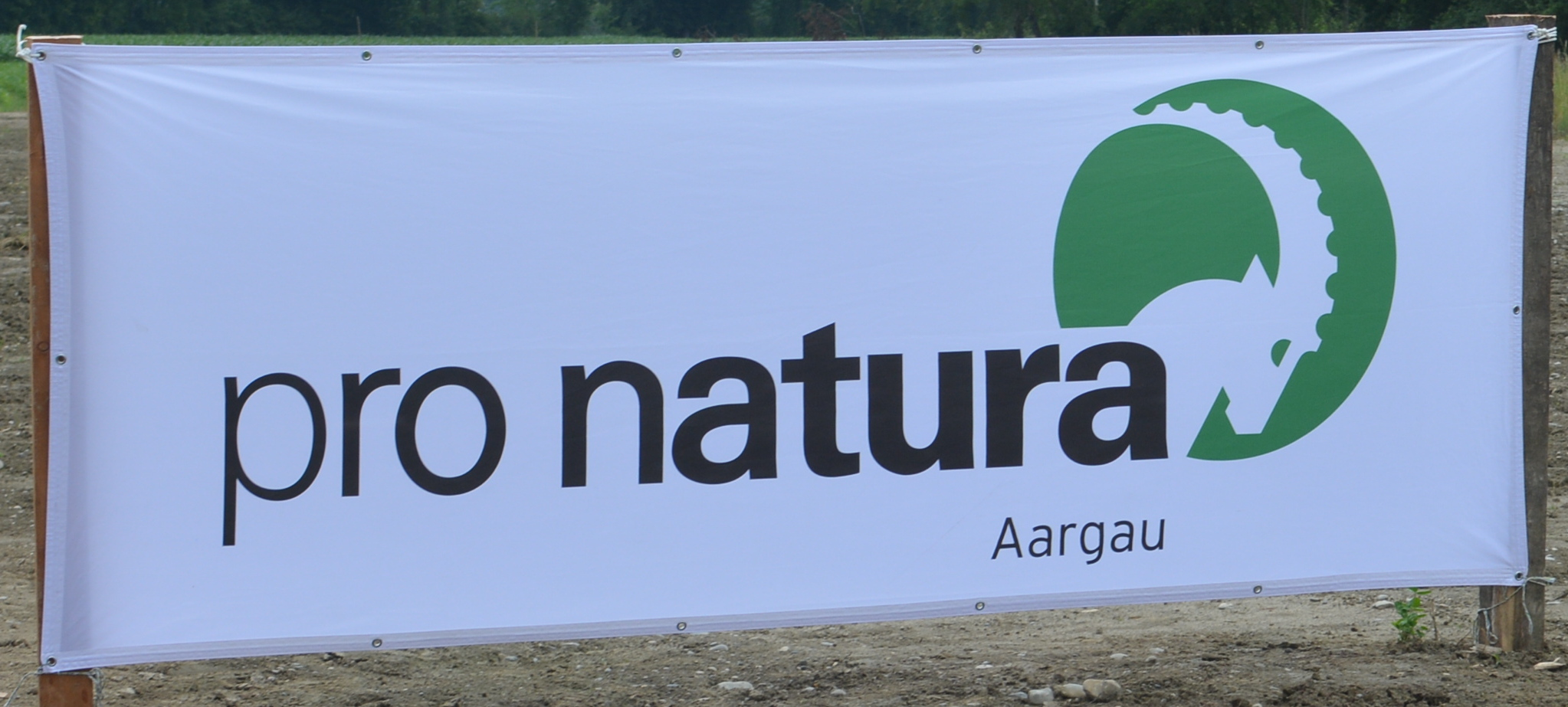
- Banner with the logo of Pro Natura (representing the head of an Alpine ibex).
- Formation: 1909; 117 years ago
- Founded at: Basel
- Type: Non-governmental organisation
- Legal status: Non-profit organisation
- Purpose: Environmental organisation
- Headquarters: Basel
- Region served: Switzerland
- Members: About 140,000
- Official language: German, French and Italian
- Subsidiaries: 24 regional sections
- Affiliations: International Union for Conservation of Nature; Friends of the Earth; Friends of the Earth Europe; International Commission for the Protection of the Alps
- Budget: 20 million Swiss francs
- Staff: About 120
- Website: www.pronatura.ch
- Formerly called: Swiss League for the Protection of Nature

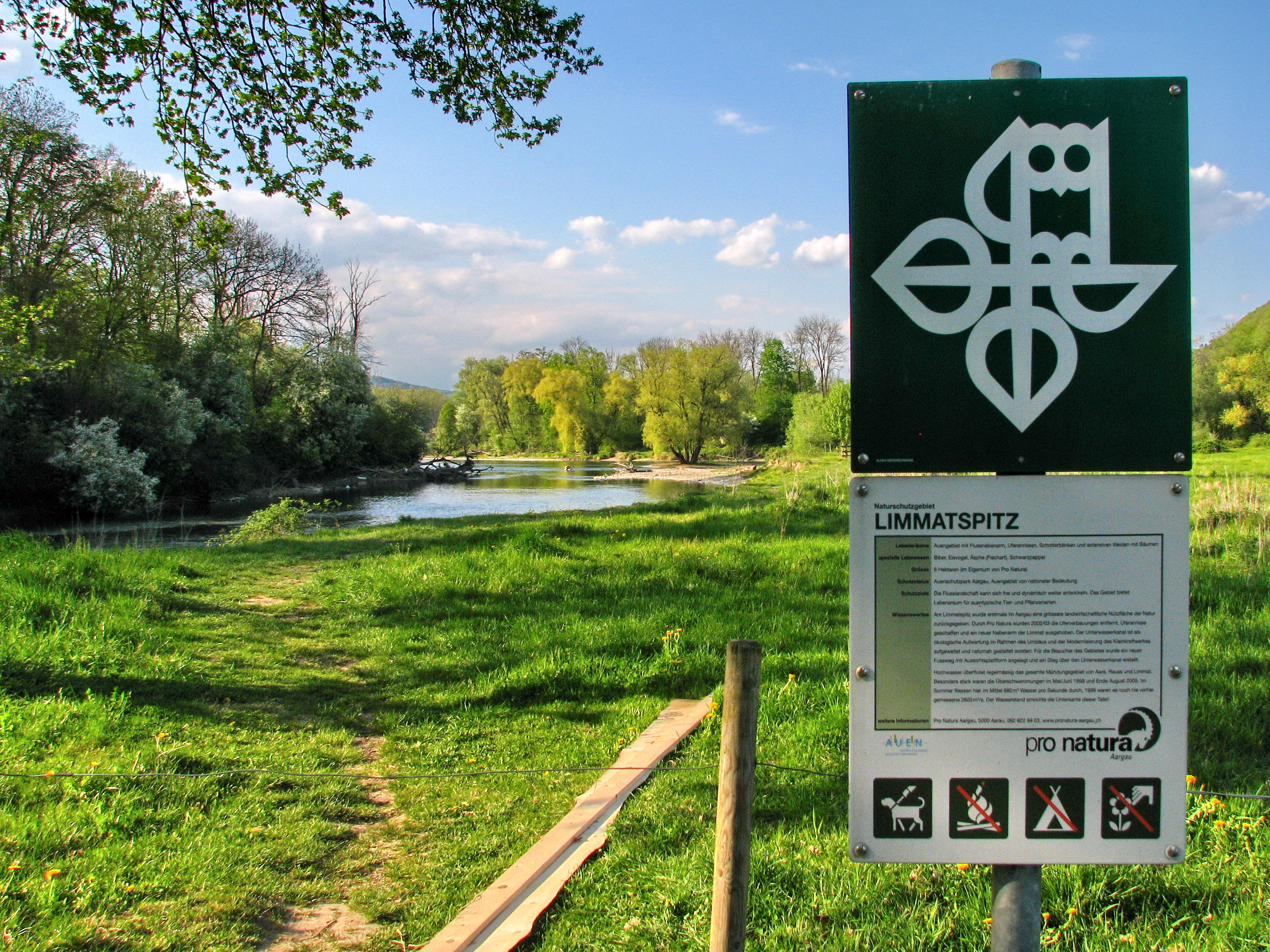
The Limmatspitz nature reserve of Pro Natura Aargau.

Pro Natura, founded in 1909 in Basel as Swiss League for the Protection of Nature, is the oldest environmental organisation in Switzerland.

Pro Natura takes care of about 700 nature reserves of various sizes throughout Switzerland (250 square kilometres, of which 60 square kilometres are owned by Pro Natura).

== History ==
In 1909, representatives of the Swiss Society of Natural Sciences founded the Swiss League for the Protection of Nature (German: Schweizerischen Bund für Naturschutz, French: Ligue suisse pour la protection de la nature) to fund and create the Swiss National Park (inaugurated in 1914). In 2000, Pro Natura launched a campaign supporting the creation of a second Swiss National Park.

In 1947, the Swiss League for the Protection of Nature organised an international conference on the protection of nature in Brunnen. It resulted in the creation of the International Union for Conservation of Nature in 1948.

Between 1958 and 1963, the Swiss League for the Protection of Nature, together with the Swiss Heritage Society and the Swiss Alpine Club, established an inventory of landscapes and natural sites of national importance. Based on it, the Swiss Federal Council published the Federal Inventory of Landscapes and Natural Monuments in 1977.

Since 1995, Pro Natura has been a member of the global environmental network Friends of the Earth. In 1997, the Swiss League for the Protection of Nature adopted the name Pro Natura.

== Objectives ==
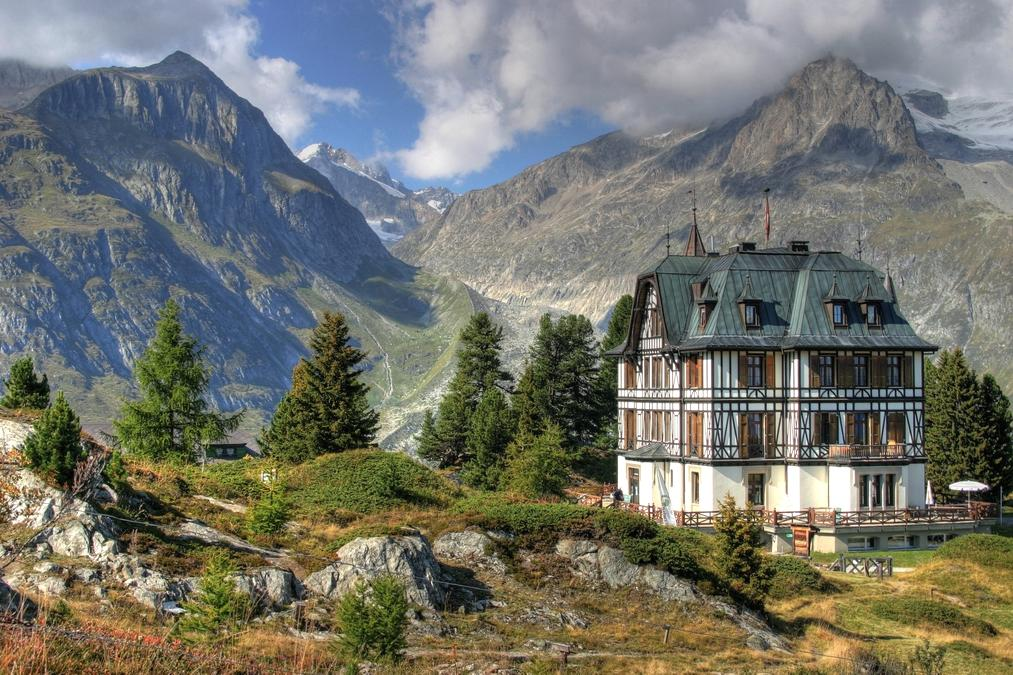
The nature centre of Pro Natura near the Aletsch Glacier (Swiss Alps). The second national nature centre of Pro Natura is located in Champ-Pittet.

The four main objectives of Pro Natura are:

- Enhance biodiversity
- Ensure the landscape identities
- Conserving natural resources
- Increase the relationship with nature

They reach their objectives through:

- Protection of nature at the political level (campaigns, federal popular initiatives, etc.)
- Nature protection in the field (nature reserves)
- Environmental education (nature centres, activities for schools, etc.)
- Communication (Pro Natura magazine)

== Controversies ==
In 2020, 3 women left the Vaud division of Pro Natura, after having been subjected in 2018 and 2019 to behaviors cited as humiliating and demeaning by the executive secretary Michel Bongard. Although relieved of certain managerial functions, Bongard remains in office. According to the president of the Vaud chapter, Serge Fischer, who mentioned the possibility of filing a complaint because a confidentiality agreement had been established with the victims, the problem is limited to managerial errors. Despite the introduction of a charter for equality in December 2019, women remain a significant minority at the head of the organization.

== Other ==
Pro Natura also draws public attention to grievances. The foundation started a media campaign in November 2014 calling for action by the federal authorities regarding excess inventory in the structures for breeding livestock and the eutrophication of fields, which has increased massively since the 1990s, particularly in the case of phosphorus.

== See also ==
- Nature parks in Switzerland
- Environmental movement in Switzerland
