= High Rockies =

Region of Colorado, United States

Coordinates: 40°20′00″N 105°42′00″W

The High Rockies, or high country, is a mountain region in the state of Colorado, USA. The High Rockies has some of the most rugged geography of the Rocky Mountains, and contains the Front Range and mountainous topography to the west, much of which is on or near the Continental Divide. The High Rockies are also the location of Rocky Mountain National Park and Arapaho National Forest.

The region is commonly considered to include Larimer County, Jackson County, Routt County, Grand County, Summit County, Eagle County, Lake County, and Pitkin County. Some notable towns there include Estes Park, Walden, Steamboat Springs, Grand Lake, Winter Park, Breckenridge, Dillon, Vail, Leadville, and Aspen.

Known for pine forests and winding roads, the former mining towns there have been renewed by wilderness tourism such as hiking, cycling, fishing, and most especially both cross-country and alpine skiing. Notable ski resorts include Copper Mountain, Keystone Resort, Steamboat Ski Resort, Beaver Creek Resort, Aspen Snowmass, and Winter Park.
