= Abbott's Mill =

- U.S. National Register of Historic Places
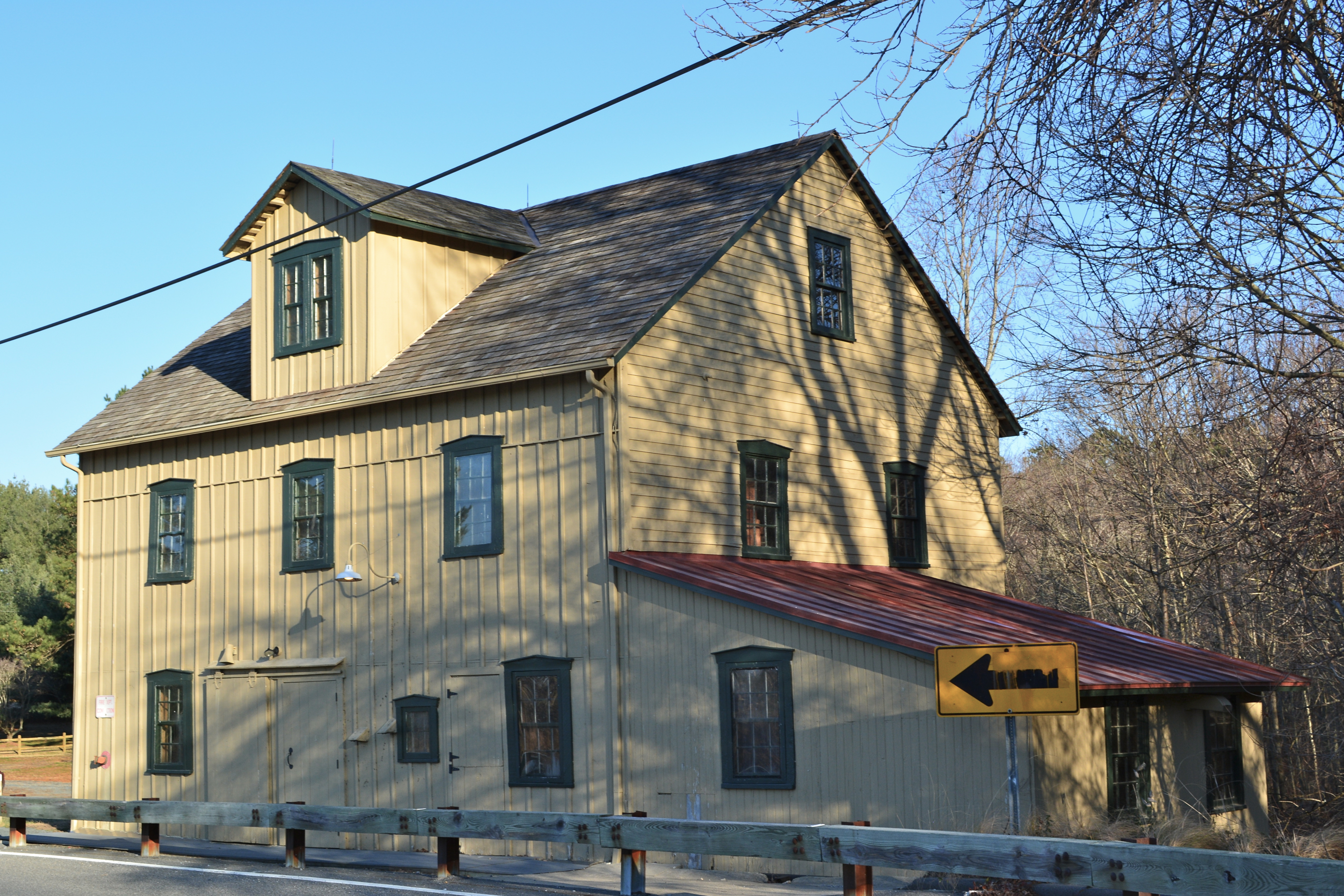

- Location within Delaware Location within the United States
- Location: 15411 Abbotts Pond Road; Milford, Delaware 19963
- Nearest city: Milford, Delaware
- Coordinates: 38°53′10″N 75°28′36″W
- Area: 0.4 acres (0.16 ha) (original); 9 acres (3.6 ha) (increase)
- NRHP reference No.: 72000300 and 79003788
- Added to NRHP: August 25, 1972 (original); May 17, 1979 (increase)

Abbott's Mill is a historic site that includes an old grist mill in Sussex County, Delaware, 3 miles (4.8 km) southwest of Milford.

It was listed on the National Register of Historic Places in 1972 with a 0.4-acre (0.16 ha) area. The listed area was increased in 1979 to include a total of 4 contributing buildings, with an increase of a 9-acre (3.6 ha) area. The increased area includes a Gothic style work built in 1868.

There's a historical marker for the old mill, placed on the north side of Abbotts Pond Road (County Road 620), across from Abbotts Pond.

The Abbott's Mill Nature Center offers tours of the grist mill and rolling mill. It is part of the 313-acre Milford Millponds Nature Preserve, which includes trails, Abbott's Mill, a pond and meadows. The Center features a native small animal collection and offers nature education programs.

In the site's 1972 NRHP nomination, it was reported the grist mill had been operable until 1960, and that plans were for it to be restored.

The listing was expanded in 1979 to include a total of 8.5 acres, including other buildings and open space.

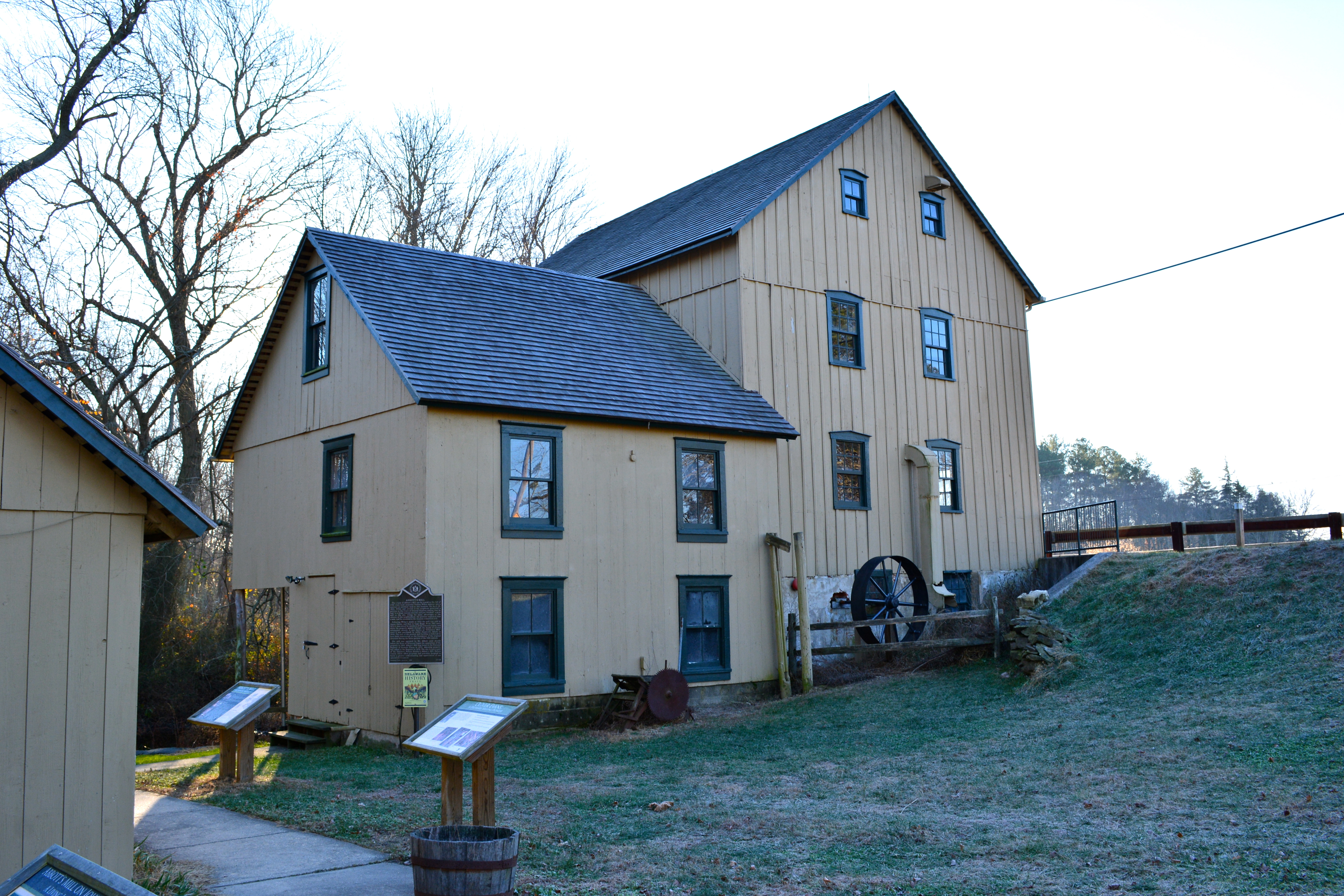
