= Grand Bay National Estuarine Research Reserve =

- IUCN category IV (habitat/species management area)
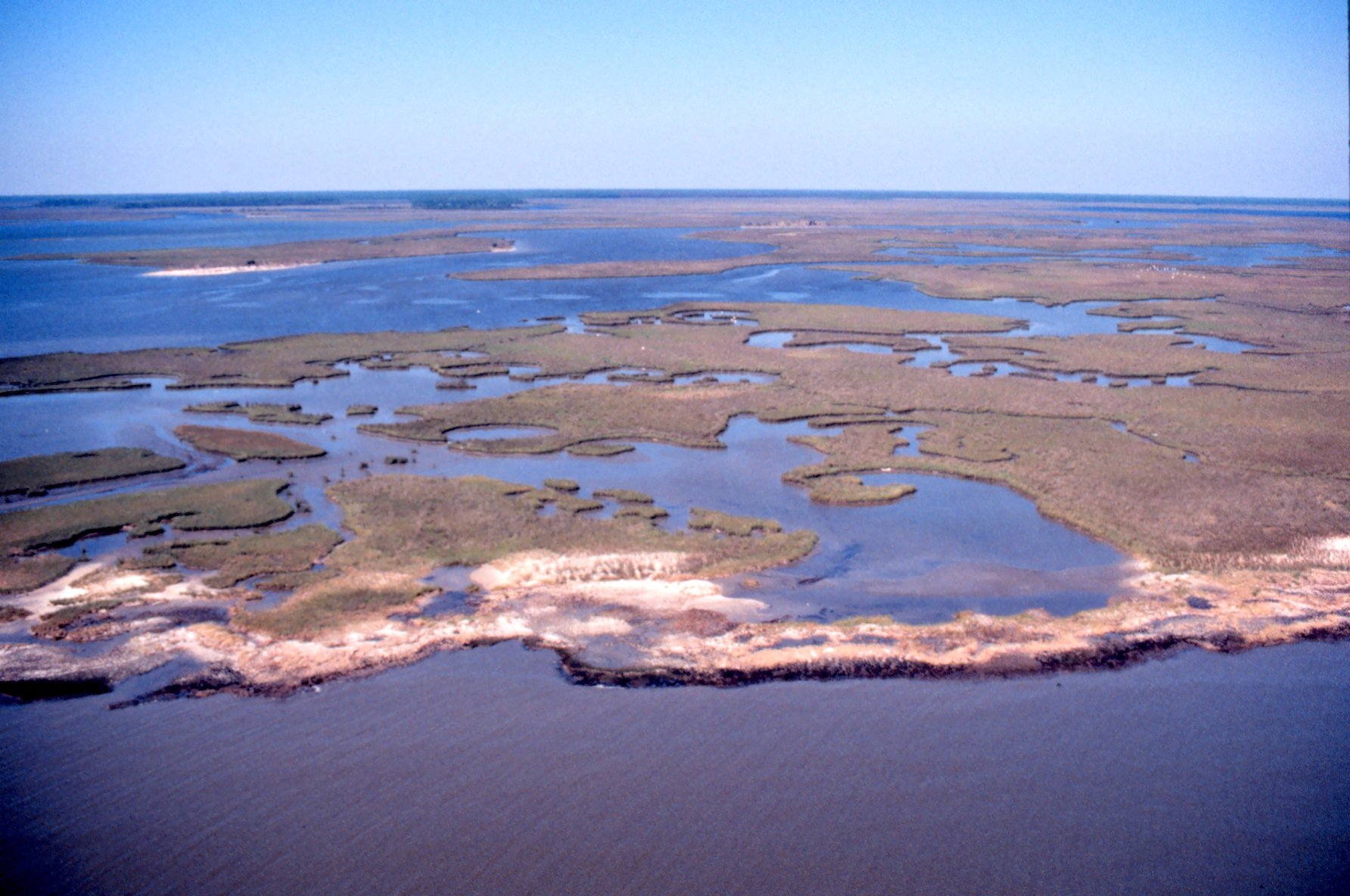
- Aerial view showing eroding shoreline along Rigolets

- Location within Mississippi
- Location: Mississippi, United States
- Nearest city: Pascagoula
- Coordinates: 30.3773°N 88.434°W
- Area: 18,400 acres (7,400 ha)
- Established: 1999
- Website: nerrs.noaa.gov/Reserve.aspx?ResID=GRD

The Grand Bay National Estuarine Research Reserve is one of the most biologically productive estuarine ecosystems in the Gulf of Mexico region, supporting several rare or endangered plant and animal species, numerous important marine fishery resources, diverse habitat types and archaeological sites, in the U.S. State of Mississippi.

The reserve encompasses coastal bay, expansive saltwater marshes, maritime pine forest, pine savanna and pitcher plant bogs. It supports extensive and productive oyster reefs and seagrass habitats. It also serves as nursery area for many of the Gulf of Mexico's important recreational and commercial marine species, such as shrimp, blue crab, speckled trout, and red fish.

As part of the Grand Bay Savannah Conservation Partnership, the Grand Bay Reserve is participating in a prescribed burn management program for the East Mississippi Sound Region. This project is widely supported by local and state government agencies as well as the oil and gas industry with facilities in adjacent fire-dependent woodlands.

The Grand Bay Coastal Resources Center Interpretative Area is the headquarters for the Reserve and the Grand Bay National Wildlife Refuge. Completed in 2009, the Center features interpretive exhibits, classrooms, laboratories and a dormitory. Environmental education programs for and special events are offered. Visitor activities include hiking, boating, paddling, photography, fishing and hunting.
