= Nature center =

Facility designed for natural and environmental education

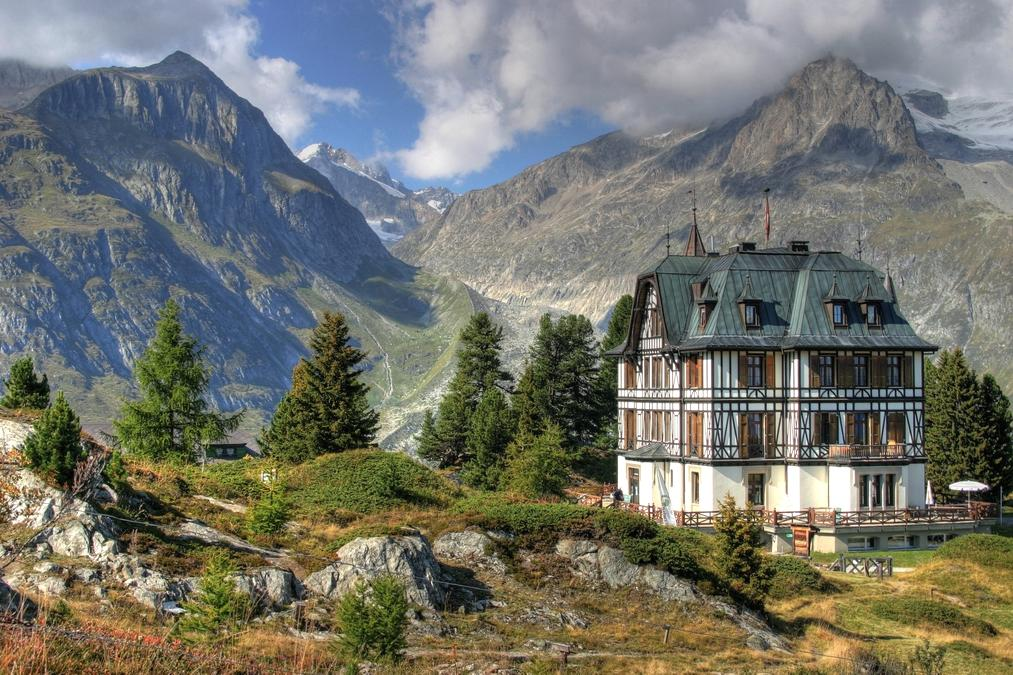
The nature centre of Pro Natura near the Aletsch Glacier (Swiss Alps).

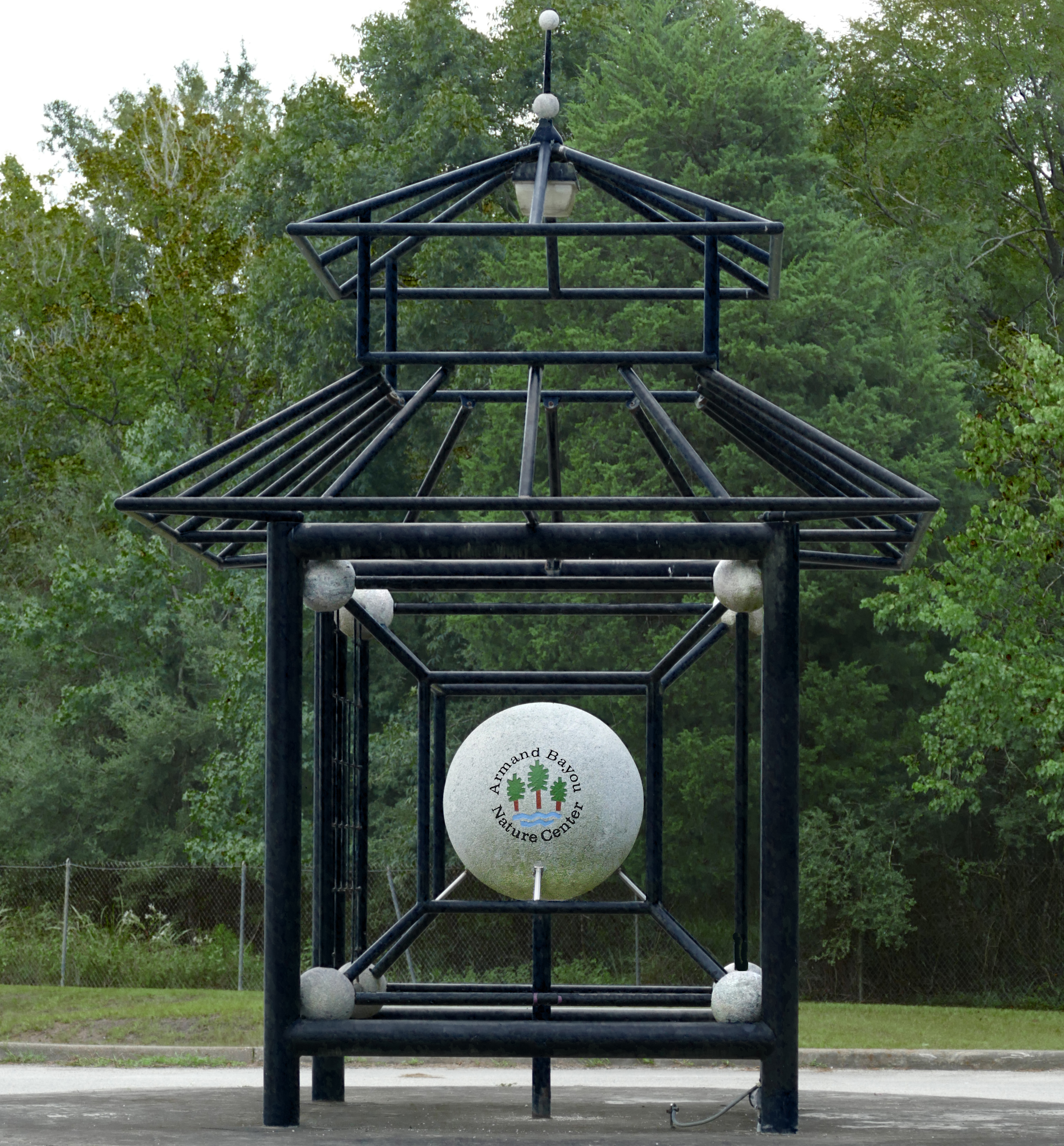
Armand Bayou Nature Center -- Entrance Sculpture

A nature center (or nature centre) is an organization with a visitor center or interpretive center designed to educate people about nature and the environment. Usually in a protected open space, nature centers often have trails through their property. Some are in a state or city park, and some have special gardens or an arboretum. Their properties can be characterized as nature preserves and wildlife sanctuaries. Nature centers generally display small live animals, such as reptiles, rodents, insects, or fish. There are often museum exhibits and displays about natural history, or preserved mounted animals or nature dioramas. Nature centers are staffed by paid or volunteer naturalists and most offer educational programs to the general public, as well as summer camp, after-school and school group programs. These educational programs teach people about nature conservation as well as the scientific method, biology, and ecology.

Some nature centers allow free admission but collect voluntary donations in order to help offset expenses. They usually rely on support from volunteers.

Environmental education centers differ from nature centers in that their museum exhibits and education programs are available mostly by appointment, although casual visitors may be allowed to walk on their grounds.

Some city, state and national parks have facilities similar to nature centers, such as museum exhibits, dioramas and trails, and some offer park nature education programs, usually presented by a park ranger.

== See also ==
- List of nature centers
- National park
