= Theatre Memphis =

Non-profit community theatre in Memphis, Tennessee

Coordinates: 35.1142°N 89.9083°W

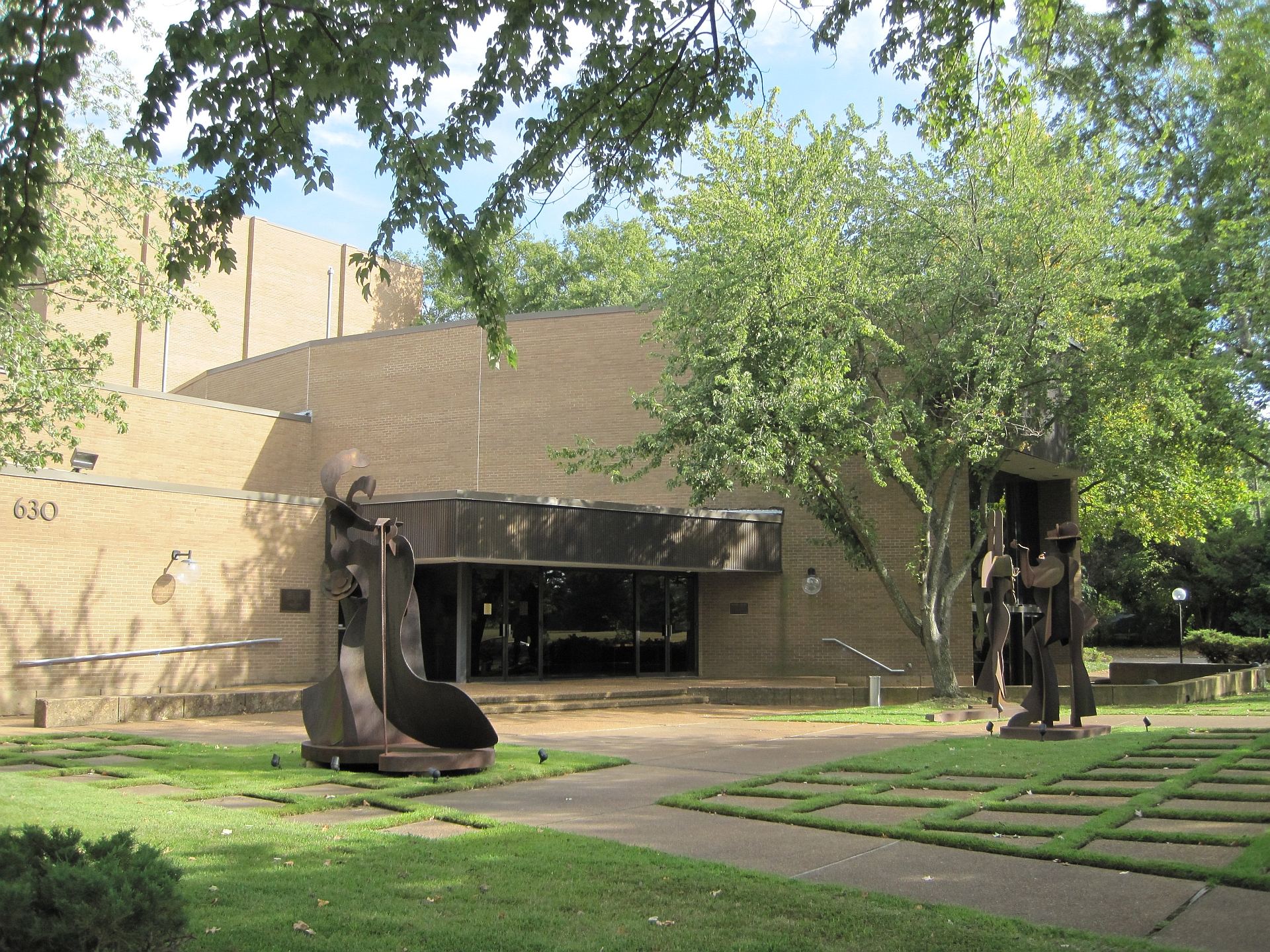
An image of Theatre Memphis

Theatre Memphis is a non-profit community theatre located in Memphis, Tennessee. The building houses two separate stages – the Lohrey Theatre main stage, which seats up to 411, and the smaller black-box theatre, the Next Stage, which seats approximately 100.

== History ==
In the holiday season of 1920, Mrs. Fairfax Proudfit Walkup called a group of interested friends to form a "little theatre." The Memphis Little Theatre Players was thus founded in 1920 and presented three one-act plays ("The Dream," "Aren't They Wonders," and "Helena's Husband") as its first performance on May 20, 1921 in Germania Hall at Third Street and Jefferson Avenue. The company was chartered on January 17, 1922 for the purpose of "producing plays, encouraging the art and the writing of plays, and the uplift of the drama and its allied arts..." Later stagings occurred in the auditorium of the Nineteenth Century Club on Third Street and at St. Agnes Conservatory on Vance. In 1925, a merger was made with the Drama League (the local chapter of a national organization that supported the theatrical arts), and a new Memphis Little Theatre was born. Also in 1925, the Theatre opened its doors to its first permanent home, named the Stable Playhouse, a 90-seat venue housed in a former stable on the grounds of the James Lee Art Academy at Adams and Orleans. Through the generosity of many Memphians who gave "One Hundred Dollar" subscriptions, and through the courtesy of the Memphis Park Commission, in October 1929 the Memphis Little Theatre moved into its second permanent home (the Pink Palace Playhouse) a 250-seat venue in the east wing of the Memphis Museum of Natural History and Industrial Arts (now known as the Pink Palace), the unfinished mansion of Piggly Wiggly founder, Clarence Saunders. The theatre operated in the shallow end of the swimming pool of the mansion, a suggestion from Mrs. Clarence (Carolyn) Saunders). In September 1970, the Commercial Appeal announced that the Little Theatre was embarking on a "mammoth drive to raise $1,291,000 for a new playhouse in Audubon Park." By the summer of 1973 enough money had been pledged to convince the board to give architect Wells Awsumb and contractor Tom Thayer the go-ahead, and a groundbreaking was held on Sunday June 3, 1973. In 1974, the Board chose Theatre Memphis as its new name; and on May 1, 1975, the theatre opened a production of My Fair Lady in its new and present location, a 435-seat venue at 630 Perkins Extended.

Eugart Yerian, a graduate of Pasadena Playhouse in California, arrived in 1932 as theatre director and served in that position until 1961. In 1962, Sherwood Lohrey was named theatre director where he remained until his retirement in 1995. Theatre Memphis opened its doors on its current location in East Memphis on May 1, 1975. In recent years, Theatre Memphis has expanded its personnel to 14 full-time staff members and over 700 volunteers. They have also upgraded their current facilities, expand community outreach and consistently balance annual budgets

=== Executive Producers ===
- 1921 Mr. Harrison Crofford
- 1921-1925 Mrs. John.F. Bruce
- 1925-1926 Mr. Minor Coburn
- 1926-1927 Mr. Colin Clements
- 1927-1930 Mr. Alexander Wyckoff
- 1930-1932 Mr. Blanchard McKee
- 1932-1939 Mr. Eugart Yerian
- 1939-1941 Mr. Talbot Pearson
- 1941-1943 Mr. Fred Sears
- 1943-1944 Mr. George F. Sparks
- 1944-1946 Mr. William Courneed
- 1946-1947 Mr. Charles F. Coghlan
- 1947-1961 Mr. Eugart Yerian
- 1962-1995 Mr. Sherwood Lohrey
- 1995-2000 Mr. Michael Fortner
- 2000-2001 Mr. Andre Bruce Ward
- 2001-2004 Mr. Ted Strickland
- 2004–Present Mrs. Debbie Litch

=== Debbie Litch ===
In June 2004, Debbie Litch was named executive producer. Litch is credited with turning around the failing theatre. Before being named Executive Producer at Theatre Memphis, Litch was director of development at Memphis Brooks Museum of Art and interim executive director and director of marketing and development at the Memphis Symphony Orchestra. She's received the Memphis Symphony Hebe and Amphion awards, Germantown Arts Alliance Patron of the Arts Award, Gyneka Award from the Women's Theatre Festival of Memphis, the Memphis Ostrander Janie McCrary "Putting It Together" award, and the Distinguished Merit Award from the American Association of Community Theatre. During her tenure, season and single ticket sales increased 25%. In 2009, two musicals were extended because of sold-out houses.

== Dramatis Personae: The Lon Anthony Sculptures ==
In 1978, the Theatre commissioned nine sculptures from Memphis Artist Lawrence (Lon) K. Anthony, past chairman of the Art Department at Rhodes College. The sculptures were funded by a grant from the Tennessee Arts Commission, the National Endowment for the Arts and a generous gift from the Hubert Menke family. The sculptures are made of half-inch Corten steel and represent characters from the major eras of theatrical history. They were installed in September, 1979, and an official dedication took place in June, 1983. The sculpture garden was declared an official Urban Art Public Heritage Site in 2008, the first in Memphis. The characters include:

- Medea -- the Greek sorceress, a central figure in Euripides' Medea
- Cleopatra -- heroine of Shakespeare's Antony and Cleopatra and George Bernard Shaw's Caesar and Cleopatra
- Punchinello -- traditional clown character from the 16th century Italian commedia dell'arte
- Le Bourgeois Gentolhomme -- title character from Moliere's 17th century satire on social climbers
- Cyrano de Bergerac -- title character of Edmund Rostand's late 19th century poetic paean to panache
- Mme. Sarah Bernhardt -- the celebrated French actress whose name has become synonymous with great acting
- Earnest -- from Oscar Wilde's witty The Importance of Being Earnest
- Christy Mahon -- the hero of Irish playwright J.M. Synge's The Playboy of the Western World
- Hamm -- from the modern classic, Endgame, by Samuel Beckett

== Showagon ==
Showagon is the educational component of Theatre Memphis whose four actors present a variety of productions that tour to local schools, libraries and other locations.

== Notable productions ==
Theatre Memphis presents an annual production of Charles Dickens' A Christmas Carol begun by Sherwood Lohrey in 1978. In 2010, the show was presented with an all-new redesigned set after the old one had been used for the previous 32 years.

== Accomplishments ==
In 2011, Theatre Memphis was recognized by the American Association of Community Theatre for outstanding service to community theatres. Some of the accomplishments cited included a balanced budget for six consecutive years while increasing operating budgets by 50%, consistent artistic excellence recognition for productions and staff from local, state and national organizations and adding additional staff for production consistency and quality. They were also recognized for their education and outreach programs and for developing innovative projects to raise funds, patrons, and awareness.
