= Veda Louise Reed =

American artist (1934–2025)

Veda Louise Reed (January 5, 1934 – June 3, 2025) was an American artist.

== Background ==
Reed was born in Granite, Oklahoma, United States. In 1951, Reed moved in with her aunt, Joyce Ottum, a fashion illustrator, in Salt Lake City, Utah. While there, Reed began taking art classes. She moved again in 1952 to live with her father in Memphis, Tennessee. She attended the Memphis Academy of Art (renamed the Memphis College of Art) for fashion design, however she switched to painting.

Reed died on June 3, 2025, at the age of 91.

== Career ==
Reed's first painting was reviewed by Guy Northrop, an art critic from the Memphis Commercial Appeal. In 1956, she received her BFA and first prize for fabric design in the Young Americans and Young Scandinavians award, which was sponsored by the Museum of Contemporary Crafts. Additionally, in 1956, she was appointed registrar by the Memphis Academy of Art and she sold her first painting to Julie Isenberg.

Reed presented her first solo exhibition, entitled "The Book Shelf" in Memphis. From 1957 to 1963, she exhibited four different solo exhibitions in the Morris Gallery in New York. Her work was reviewed by both Dore Ashton in the New York Times and Sidney Tillim in Arts magazine. In 1958, she received the Memphis Academy of Art Fellowship and later, in 1959, she received an Honorable Mention from the Delta Annual in Little Rock, Arkansas. In 1960, Reed earned first prize in the Designer Craftsmen USA award from the Museum of Contemporary Crafts and she began her study of landscapes in England.

In 1961, Reed returned from her European travels and began teaching part-time at her alma mater. She also received an honorable mention for her entry in the Painting of the Year Exhibition in Atlanta, Georgia. By 1962, Reed's position at the Memphis Academy of Art became full-time and she worked there until 1995 when she retired as a senior faculty member. In that time, Reed taught many different art forms including painting, drawing, lettering, perspective drawing, design, fabric design, still life, and landscape painting.

From 1963 to 1996, Reed exhibited four times at the Memphis College of Art. In 1967, she premiered at the Brooks Memorial Art Gallery (now Memphis Brooks Museum of Art) with an exhibition entitled, “Veda Reed Paintings: Houses and Things.” That same year, Reed exhibited in both the Boatman Gallery in New York and Great Expectations in Memphis. During the 1970s, Reed painted interiors and still lifes, however a visit to Granite, Oklahoma during this period inspired her to create a new series inspired by Oklahoma landscapes.

From 1971 to 1976, Reed exhibited six different exhibitions at the Southwestern at Memphis, Great Expectations, and the Michelson Gallery in Washington, D.C. From 1980 to 1989, she exhibited at the Brooks Museum of Art and Alice Bingham Galleries in Memphis. Reed also initiated annual trips out West during this time. From 1991 to 1995, Reed exhibited at the Bingham Kurts Gallery in Memphis and in 1995, she retired from her teaching position at her alma mater. In 1996, Reed exhibited with her former teacher, Burton Callicott, and she earned two awards: the Tennessee Governor’s Award in the Arts and the Benjamin Goodman Faculty Travel Award from the Memphis College of Art.

In 1998 and 1999, she exhibited at the Tennessee State Museum and the Ledbetter Lusk Gallery, respectively. From 2001 to 2016, she exhibited six times at the David Lusk Gallery in Memphis. In 2016, Reed produced a video in conjunction with the Brooks Museum about her stencil on canvas art formation process.

Reed was still working in Memphis and expected to open a solo exhibition at the David Lusk Gallery in 2019.

== Artistic influences ==
- Burton Callicott
- Dorthy Strum
- Martha Turner
- Ted Faiers

== Works ==
Reed was known for her landscape paintings of Oklahoma. Veda's work appears to be abstract in style, due to her use of broad color fields and intense flatness; however her inspiration for this body of work connected her to the Impressionist movement; each individual canvas represents a singular moment in time and Veda used her Oklahoma landscape studies to explore the relationship between light and the land, in addition to remembering important life events. Veda primarily used the medium of oil on canvas and stencils to help her create the dramatic, kinetic shapes that characterize her canvases.

- Oklahoma Landscape-Yellow Sky, 1979, oil on canvas. Currently on display at the Memphis Brooks Museum of Art.
- Oklahoma Sunset: Garuda Lands in Black Fox Hollow to Pick Up Charlie, 1989, oil on canvas. Currently on display at the Memphis Brooks Museum of Art.
