= Self-service =

Practice of serving oneself when shopping or getting services

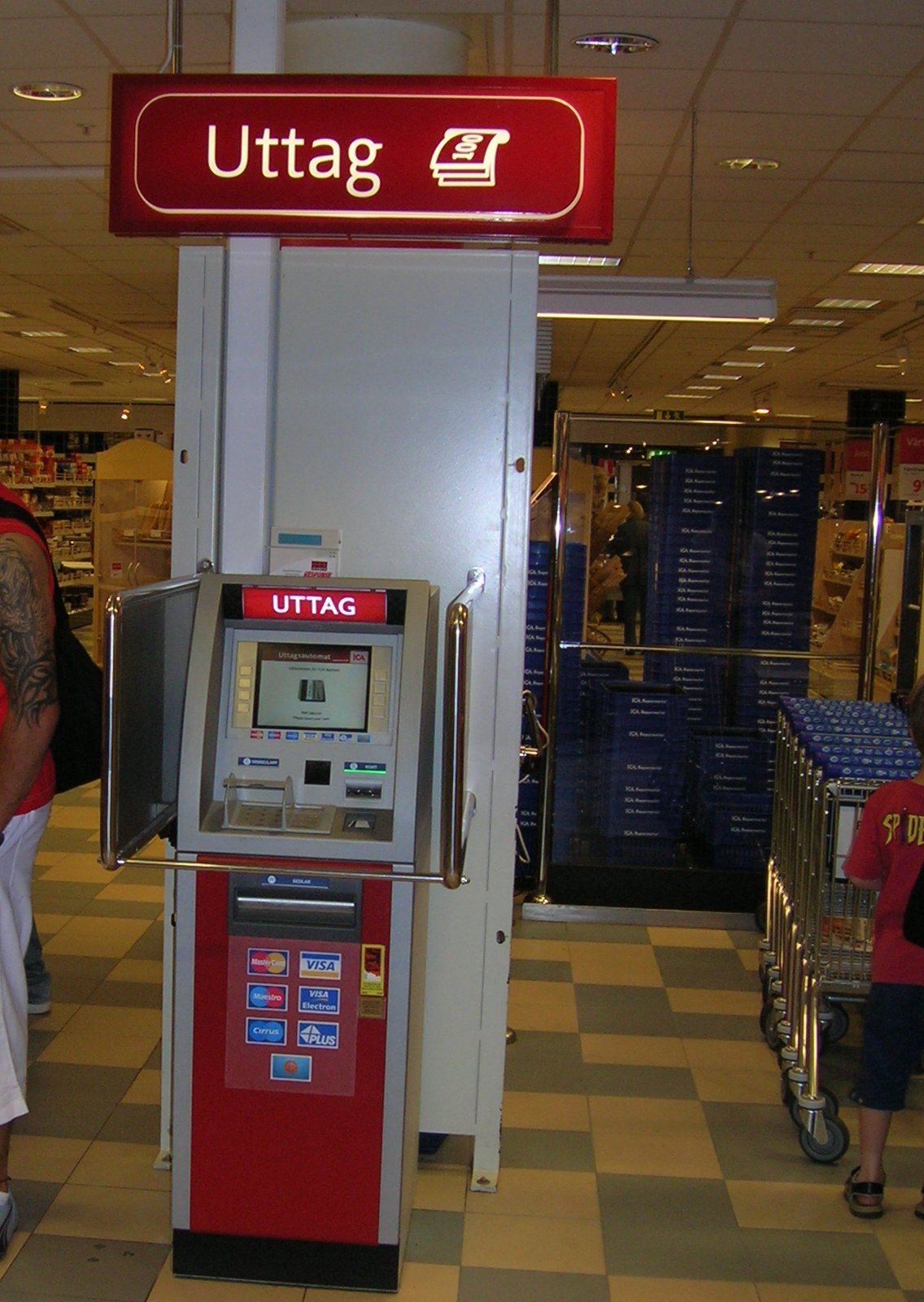
Smaller indoor ATMs dispense money inside convenience stores and other busy areas, such as this off-premises Wincor Nixdorf mono-function ICA ATM in Sweden.

Self-service is a system whereby customers acquire (or serve) themselves goods or services, paying for the items at a point-of-sale, as opposed to a shop assistant or clerk acquiring goods or providing services in addition to taking payment. Common examples include ATMs, coin-operated laundrettes, self-service checkouts, self-service petrol stations, and buffet restaurants.

== History ==
=== Grocery stores and supermarkets ===
Before the 20th century many businesses such as grocery stores had clerks or assistants who would serve customers individually, taking required items from the shelves, before adding up the total at the till. Some products such as ham, cheese, and bacon were sliced to order, while dry goods such as flour would be weighed out from large barrels.

On September 6, 1916 the first Piggly Wiggly opened in Memphis, Tennessee by Clarence Saunders, the world's first self-service grocery store. Customers would pick up a wicker basket upon entering the store, and then walk through the store placing items they intended to purchase in their baskets. As the duties of the shop clerks were reduced to stocking shelves with goods and taking payment at the tills, a "small army of clerks" was no longer necessary, allowing for cost reductions to be passed on to the consumer. In 1937, Saunders start opening Keedoozle stores, a further development of his idea of automated grocery stores. By the 1950s about 80% of the grocery trade in America was on a self-service basis.

In the United Kingdom, trials with self-service began in the inter-war period, specifically in the forms of cafeteria (self-service restaurant), womenswear, and grocery and provisions shops. After the Second World War this gathered pace, with the first permanent self-service store, a co-op, opening in 1948 and Tesco's first self-service store in St Albans opening later in the same year. The reduction in the number of staff needed to operate such a store, and the increased speed at which customers could be served, helped to mitigate problems created by the labour shortages in the war. The concept caught on quickly, with Sainsbury's, Waitrose, Morrisons and Marks & Spencer adopting self-service models in the 1950s, and one sixth of all co-op grocery stores being self-service by 1957.

In 2020, Amazon Fresh (a subsidiary of Amazon) opened its first till-less store. Some of these stores use "grab and go" systems where surveillance cameras and other technology tracks what each customer takes and places back, whereas most use "dash carts" which use touchscreens, barcode scanners, cameras, and various sensors to track items placed into and removed from the cart. Payment is done by scanning a QR code from their Amazon app, connecting the purchase to their Amazon account and allowing it to be billed through the payment method linked to their account.

=== At petrol stations ===
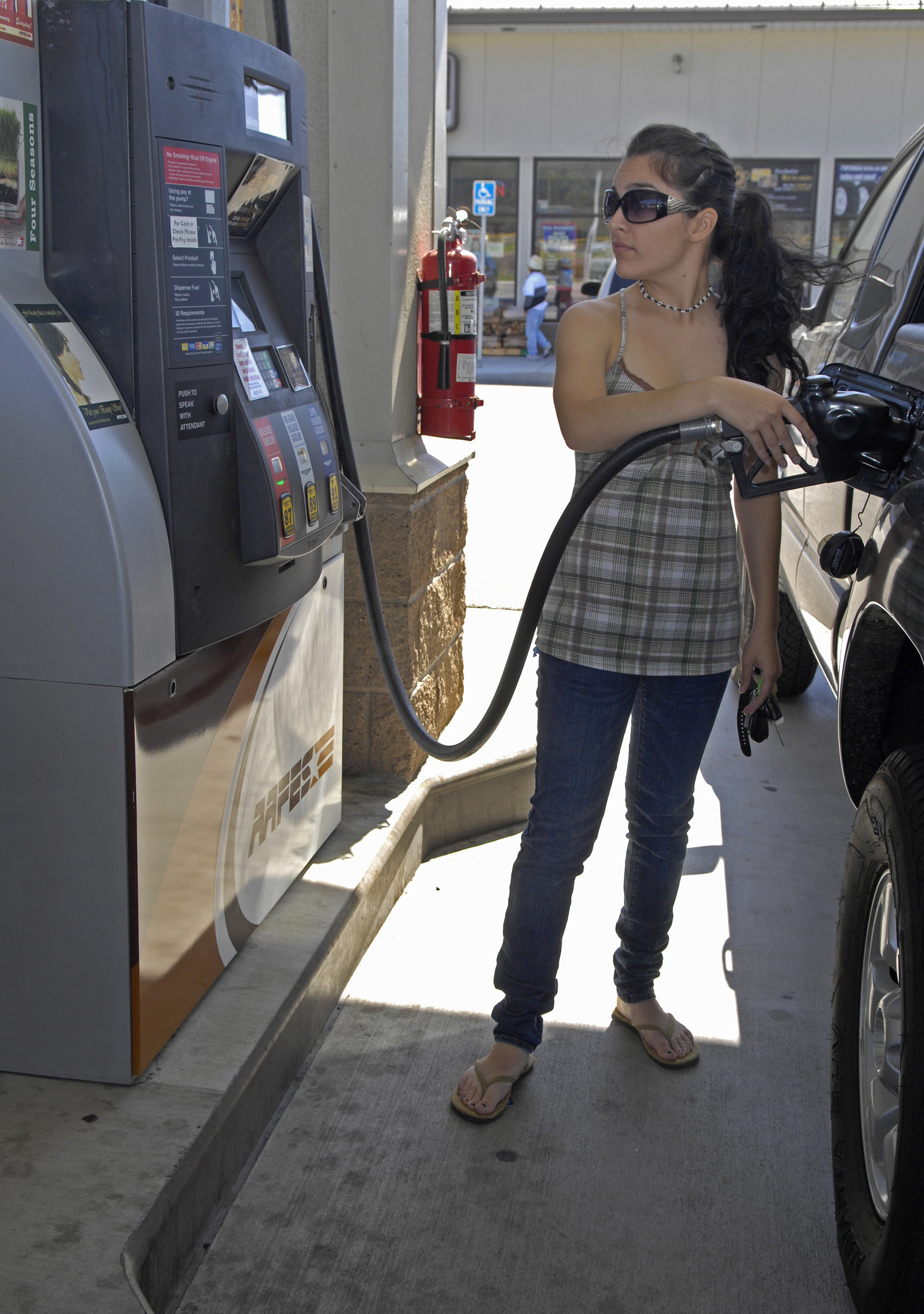
Self-service fuelling

In 1930 the Hoosier Petroleum Co. attempted to trial self-serve fuelling, but was prevented from doing so as it was considered a fire hazard.

In 1947, Frank Urich opened the first self-service gasoline station in Los Angeles, California. It was an unbranded station with rows of self-service pumps and roller-skating attendants who would collect money and reset dispensers. The pumps used mechanical computers to track how much fuel was dispensed, and were manually reset between each customer. A few other unbranded stations using this model were created, but the idea didn't catch on with major retailers at the time.

In 1964, Herb Timms showcased an invention to John Roscoe that would allow for an attendant inside the store to dispense gasoline at the pumps. This remote fuelling system quickly took off, with three of Roscoe's twelve stores employing it and averaging 4,500 gallons in sales per week.

In 1961 Britain's first self-service petrol station opened in Southwark, London. In 1968, the use of "unattended fuelling" was permitted in the City of London, with BP announcing plans to open self-service units within the city.

By the mid-1980s, credit card readers were integrated into pump dispensers, allowing for "pay-at-the-pump" transactions.

In 1998, Japan abolished the Special Petroleum Law, allowing for self-service petrol stations, although at least one attendant is still required to keep watch over customers to ensure safety.

In the 21st century, self-service gas stations are the norm across the US, and New Jersey is the only state "where drivers are not allowed to pump their own gasoline."

=== In banking ===
In 1960, Armenian-American inventor Luther Simjian invented an automated deposit machine (accepting coins, cash and cheques) although it did not have cash dispensing features. His US patent was first filed on 30 June 1960 and granted on 26 February 1963. The roll-out of this machine, called Bankograph, was delayed by a couple of years, due in part to Simjian's Reflectone Electronics Inc. being acquired by Universal Match Corporation. The New York Times wrote in 1998 that it was his most famous invention and "the basis for the now-ubiquitous A.T.M., from which he never made a penny." His device did not see widespread adoption however.

In Europe, in 1967, three independent efforts to create ATMs entered use simultaneously, the Swedish Bankomat, and in the UK the Barclaycash and Chubb MD2. In 1968 a joint effort between IBM and Swedish banks began testing a networked cashpoint, with Lloyds Bank soon following, deploying networked devices in 1973.

=== Vending machines ===
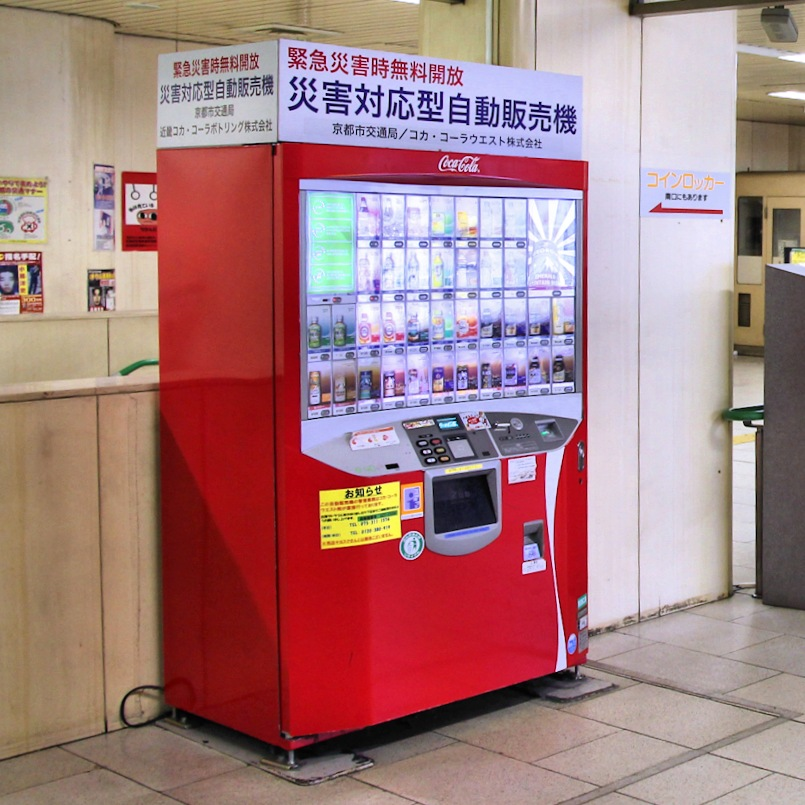
A soft drink vending machine in Japan

The first vending machine was described in a work by Hero of Alexandria in the 1st century AD. The machine accepted a coin which when deposited fell upon a pan attached to a lever. The lever opened a valve which let wine or holy water to flow out. The pan continued to tilt with the weight of the coin until it fell off, at which point a counterweight snapped the lever back up and turned off the valve after a predetermined amount of liquid was dispensed.

Coin-operated machines that dispensed tobacco were being operated as early as 1615 in the taverns of England. The machines were portable and made of brass. An English bookseller, Richard Carlile, devised a newspaper dispensing machine for the dissemination of banned works in 1822. Simon Denham was awarded British Patent no. 706 for his stamp dispensing machine in 1867, the first fully automatic vending machine.

Vending machines are considerably popular in Japan. There are more than 5.5 million machines installed throughout the nation, and Japan holds the highest ratio of machines per person for any country with one machine for every twenty-three people.

=== Buffets ===
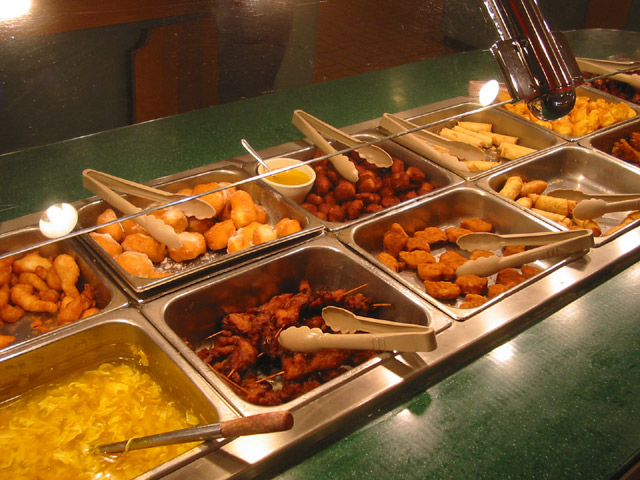
A self-serve buffet restaurant in the United States

Starting in the 19th century, supper, a lighter post-dinner evening meal began to sometimes be served as (and so called) a 'buffet', particularly at larger events such as grand balls. Likewise large cooked English breakfasts were often served this way. The term came from the French sideboard which the food was traditionally placed on, before becoming applied to the self-service format of food.

The all-you-can-eat restaurant was introduced in Las Vegas by Herbert "Herb" Cobb McDonald in 1946.

== Selfsourcing ==
Selfsourcing is the internal development and support of IT systems by knowledge workers with minimal contribution from IT specialists, and has been described as essentially outsourcing development effort to the end user. At times they use in-house Data warehouse systems, which often run on mainframes.

Various terms have been used to describe end user self service, when someone who is not a professional programmer programs, codes, scripts, writes macros, and in other ways uses a computer in a user-directed data processing accomplishment, such as End user computing and End user development. In the 1990s, Windows versions of mainframe packages were already available.

=== Data sourcing ===
When desktop personal computers became nearly as widely distributed as having a work phone, in companies having a data processing department, the PC was often unlinked to the corporate mainframe, and data was keyed in from printouts. Software was for do-it-yourself/selfsourcing, including spreadsheets, programs written in DOS-BASIC or, somewhat later, dBASE. Use of spreadsheets, the most popular end-user development tool, was estimated in 2005 to be done by 13 million American employees.

Some data became siloed Once terminal emulation arrived, more data was available, and it was more current. Techniques such as Screen scraping and FTP reduced rekeying. Mainframe products such as FOCUS were ported to the PC, and business intelligence (BI) software became more widespread.

Companies large enough to have mainframes and use BI, having departments with analysts and other specialists, have people doing this work full-time. Selfsourcing, in such situations, is taking people away from their main job (such as designing ads, creating surveys, planning advertising campaigns); pairs of people, one from an analysis group and another from a "user" group, is the way the company wants to operate. Selfsourcing is not viewed as an improvement.

Data warehouse was an earlier term in this space.

=== Issues ===
It is crucial for the system's purposes and goals to be aligned with that of the organizational goals. Developing a system that contradicts organizational goals will most likely lead to a reduction in sales and customer retention. As well, due to the large amount of time it may take for development, it is important allocate your time efficiently as time is valuable.

Knowledge workers must also determine what kind of external support they will require. In-house IT specialists can be a valuable commodity and are often included in the planning process.

It is important to document how the system works, to ensure that if the developing knowledge workers move on others can use it and even attempt to make needed updates.

=== Advantages ===
Knowledge workers are often exactly aware of their immediate needs, and can avoid formalizations and time needed for project cost/benefit analysis and delays due to chargebacks or need for managerial/supervisory signoffs.

Additional benefits are:

Improved requirement determination
This eliminates involving a separate IT specialist to cater for what they want. There is a greater chance for user short-term satisfaction.
Increased participation
Pride and self-push will add desire for completion, sense of ownership and higher workplace morale. Increased morale can be infectious and lead to benefits in other areas.
Performance in systems development
Step-by-step details preclude formal documentation, time and resources are concentrated, whereas working with other IT specialists would be less efficient. Selfsourcing is usually faster for smaller projects that do not require the full development process.

=== Disadvantages ===
==== Inadequate expertise ====
Some knowledge workers involved in selfsourcing do not have experience or expertise with IT tools, resulting in:

Human error
Pride of ownership has been found to be a major cause of overlooking errors. A 1992 study showed that because Excel "tends to produce output even in the presence of errors" there is "user overconfidence in program correctness."
Lost hours and potential
potentially good ideas are lost. These incomplete projects, after consuming many hours, often draw workers away from their primary duties.
Lack of organizational focus
These often form a privatized IT system, with poor integration to corporate systems. Data silos may violate policy and even privacy/HIPPA/HIPAA laws. Uncontrolled and duplicate information can become stale, leading to more problems than benefits.
Lack of design alternative analysis
Hardware and software opportunities are not analyzed sufficiently, and efficient alternatives may not be noticed and utilized. This can lead to inefficient and costly systems.
Lack of security
End users, as a group, do not understand how to build secure applications.
Lack of documentation
Knowledge workers may not have supervisors who are aware that, as time goes on, changes will be needed and these compartmentalized systems will require the help of IT specialists. Knowledge workers will usually lack experience with planning for these changes and the ability to adapt their work for the future.

==== Shadow IT ====
Although departmental computing has decades of history, one-person-show situations either suffer from inability to interact with a helpdesk or fail to benefit from wheels already invented.

== Self-service tools ==
Among the basic examples of various categories are:

- software tools - the individual parts of office suites represent areas of functionality used for knowledge management, both in finding stored information and in entering new content. Versions of these exist both for locally stored (desktop computer) programs and internet/cloud-based.
  - Human resource departments offer employee self-service, including providing employees with tools for skill building and career planning.
- self-service kiosks - interactive kiosks have become common in industries like QSR, transportation, hospitality, healthcare, cannabis, and more. They serve applications like self-ordering, check-in, ticketing, wayfinding, and more.

== See also ==
- Automated retail – Self-service standalone kiosks
- Automated teller machine – Device used to perform financial transactions
- Insourcing – Contracting formerly external outsourced tasks back within an organisation
- Interactive kiosk – Public computer terminal
- Self checkout – Machine for customers to complete a retail transaction
- Shadow work – Unpaid labor as a complement of industrial labour and services
- Ticket machine – Vending machine that produces paper or electronic tickets
- Unmanned store – Retail concept in which no employees staff a store
- Vending machine – Machine which dispenses products to customers
