= Robert Krampf =

American former science educator and convicted sex offender (born 1956)

- Born: John Robert Krampf; 1956 (age 69–70); Memphis, Tennessee, U.S.
- Occupation: Science educator
- Years active: 2006–2020

John Robert Krampf (born 1956) is an American former science educator and convicted sex offender. He studied geology at the University of Tennessee and worked at the Pink Palace Museum and Planetarium until 1987, when he began touring the United States with a one-man show he called "Mr. Electricity". A lifelong fascination with science, combined with a desire to teach has led Krampf on adventures ranging from excavating dinosaur bones in Wyoming to watching whales off the coast of Mexico.

In 2006, Krampf adopted the moniker "The Happy Scientist" and began to post educational entertainment content targeted towards children online, with videos depicting various science projects and experiments.

In September 2020, Krampf was arrested for possession of child pornography, as part of a sting operation that led to eleven others arrested as well. He pled guilty in March 2021, and was sentenced to four years in prison.
