= Callicott =

Callicott is a surname. Notable people with the surname include:

- Burton Callicott (1907–2003), American artist
- J. Baird Callicott (born 1941), American philosopher
- Mississippi Joe Callicott (1899–1969), American blues singer
- Ransom M. Callicott (1895–1962), American businessman
