= Cynthia Bringle =

American potter

- Born: 1939 (age 86–87); Memphis, Tennessee
- Known for: potter
- Website: cynthiabringlepottery.com

Cynthia Bringle (born 1939) was born in Memphis, Tennessee, and has lived and worked in Penland, North Carolina since 1970. She is a potter and teaches at the Penland School of Crafts, Anderson Ranch Arts Center, and John C. Campbell Folk School.

== About ==
Cynthia Bringle knew from an early age that she was interested in art, especially painting, so as a student she decided to attend the Memphis Academy of Arts with a focus on painting. She received a Bachelor of Fine Arts degree from the Memphis Academy of Art in 1962 and a Master of Fine Arts from New York State College of Ceramics, Alfred University. Bringle was named a North Carolina Living Treasure in 2009. She was honored as a Fellow of the American Craft Council in 2000. Her work is in the collection of the Burlington Art Center, the High Museum of Art, and the Mint Museum of Craft and Design. Her work, Tea Pitcher, was acquired by the Smithsonian American Art Museum as part of the Renwick Gallery's 50th Anniversary Campaign.

Cynthia Bringle represented the United States at the First American International Ceramic Symposium, which consisted of twenty-five artists from thirteen countries, and was hosted in the middle of 1973 at the Memphis Academy of Arts. In addition to an influential career as a teacher, Bringle has exhibited throughout the United States in numerous galleries, museums, and craft exhibitions. In 1992 she was interviewed for the Archives of American Art for the Archives of American Art Oral History Program
