= Memphis College of Art =

Former private art school in Memphis, Tennessee

Coordinates: 35.1459°N 89.9937°W

- Type: Private art college
- Active: 1936–2020
- Students: 450
- Undergraduates: 350
- Postgraduates: 100
- Location: Memphis, Tennessee, United States
- Campus: 8 acres
- Colors: Red and White
- Website: memphiscollegeofart.com

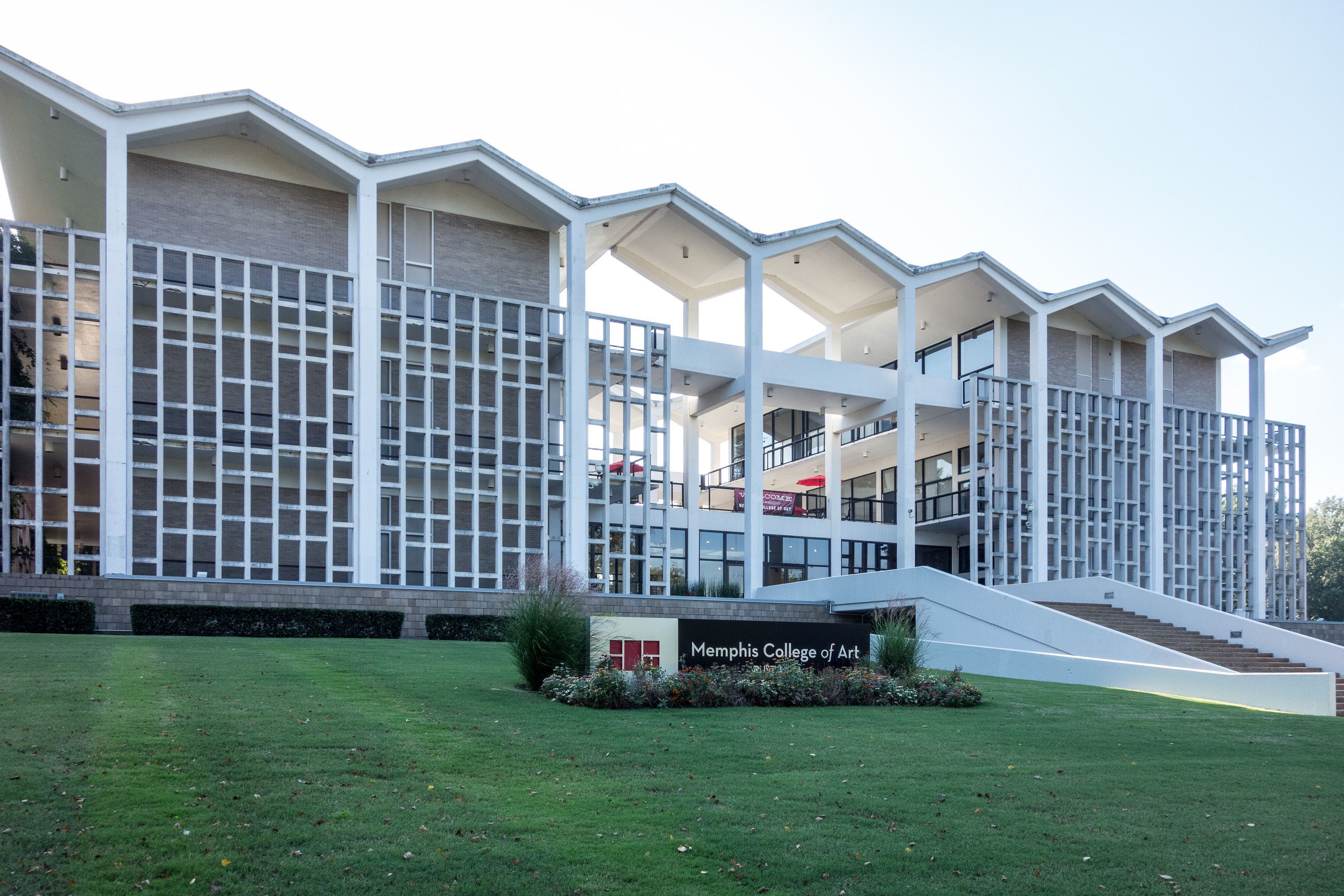
Memphis College of Art, Rust Hall

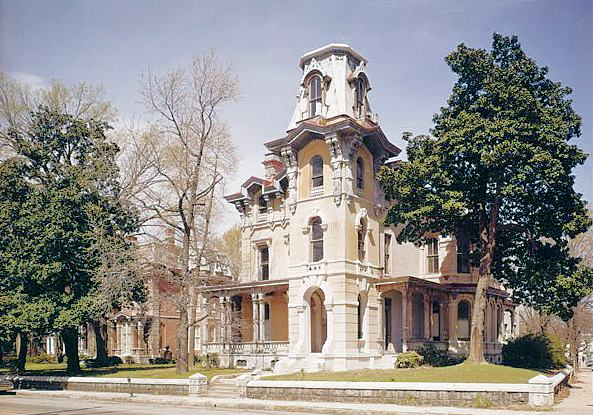
James Lee House in Victorian Village

Memphis College of Art (MCA) was a private art college in Memphis, Tennessee. It was in Overton Park, adjacent to the Memphis Brooks Museum of Art. It offered Bachelor of Fine Arts, Master of Fine Arts, Master of Arts in Art Education and Master of Arts in Teaching degrees. However, it faced significant financial challenges and closed in the spring of 2020.

== History ==
The college opened on October 5, 1936, and was once housed in the James Lee House in Victorian Village. When the college opened, it was originally named the Memphis Academy of Art. Before becoming an independent college, it was initially named the James Lee Memorial Academy of Art and was funded by the Memphis Art Association. Their independence was declared after a dispute with the Memphis Art Association's director, Florence M. McIntyre, who disapproved of their acceptance of modernism. The school then officially opened as the Mid-South School of Fine Arts, soon renamed as the Memphis Academy of Art.

From 1959 until its closing, the main building of the college was Rust Hall in Overton Park, an award-winning example of mid-century architecture designed by Roy Harrover with his company, Harrover & Mann. In its opening, the college hired a total of eleven African American teachers, despite the pervasiveness of racial discrimination nationally in 1961. Later, the position of the Memphis Academy of Art's first president was assigned to Dr. Jameson M. Jones, in 1976. Under new leadership, a milestone was reached when computer technology was merged with art by new Academy president John S. Slorp in 1982. Three years later, the Academy was renamed the Memphis College of Art.

The MCA continued to expand with graduate programs starting in 1987, new student housing in 1992, and a graduate center in 1998. Following these expansions came the addition of the Metz Hall, named after Charles B. Metz and paid for by his family's donation of $1,000,000 to the college. Then, the Nesin Graduate School was created in 2010, offering the Master of Arts Education, Master of Arts in Teaching, and Master in Fine Arts programs. Soon after, the Memphis College of Art reached its end on May 9, 2020, with its final Commencement Ceremony.

=== Closure ===
After 84 years of holding classes, the Memphis College of Art closed in May 2020. They were forced to close after facing debt and declined enrollment. The college stated that they had no future plans for fixing their troubling financial situation and the Board of Directors of the Memphis College of Art had to ultimately vote against keeping the college open. This decision was made in October 2017 as the college began preparing for their closure.

In May, 2022 the Metal Museum signed a lease for the site of the former art college.

== Achievements ==
The Memphis College of Art was the only Southern independent college accredited by the National Association of Schools of Art and Design and the Southern Association of Colleges and Schools.

== Notable alumni ==
- Blake Nelson Boyd, a film actor, comedian, and visual artist.
- Cynthia Bringle, a potter and teacher.
- Burton Callicott, an American artist and teacher.
- Amy Lynn Carter, the daughter of U.S. President Jimmy Carter.
- Carroll Cloar, a painter.
- Diana Dew, an American fashion designer.
- Emily Jacir, a Palestinian filmmaker and artist.
- Valerie Jaudon, an American painter.
- Gere Kavanaugh, an American textile, industrial, and interior designer.
- James Little, painter
- Matthew Melton, an American musician, songwriter and producer.
- Lester Julian Merriweather (born 1978), collagist, painter, sculptor
- Veda Louise Reed, an American artist.
- Joseph Seigenthaler, an American sculptor and video artist.
