= Joseph Seigenthaler =

American sculptor

Swimmer, oil paint on hand-built ceramic sculpture by Joseph Seigenthaler, Honolulu Museum of Art

Joseph Seigenthaler (May 5, 1959 – March 21 2024) was an American sculptor and video artist who was born in Nashville, Tennessee. He earned a BFA in painting from the Memphis College of Art in 1981. Shortly after graduating, he freelanced sculpting life-sized wax figures for wax museums, primarily the Music Valley Wax Museum in Nashville and the Country Music Wax Museum in Tamworth, Australia. He studied ceramic art at the Appalachian Center for Craft in Smithville, Tennessee between 1984 and 1986. In 1990, he received an MFA from Northern Illinois University.

Seigenthaler taught ceramic art at the University of Montana – Missoula, Harold Washington College in Chicago, and the School of the Art Institute of Chicago. He was married to the painter Anne Gilbert and lived and worked in Chicago. He died in March 2024.

He was best known for his bizarre and/or imbecilic figurative clay sculptures, later creating computer animation loops of his creatures. The Honolulu Museum of Art, Museo de Escultura Figurativa Internacional Contemporánea (Murcia, Spain), the Museum of Contemporary Art, Chicago, and the Racine Art Museum (Racine, Wisconsin) are among the public institutions holding work by Joseph Seigenthaler.
