= Carroll Cloar =

American painter (1913–1993)

- Born: January 18, 1913; Crittenden County, Arkansas, U.S.
- Died: April 10, 1993 (aged 80); Memphis, Tennessee, U.S.
- Education: Art Students League of New York
- Style: Surrealism

Carroll Cloar (January 18, 1913 – April 10, 1993) was a nationally known 20th-century painter born in Earle, Arkansas, who focused his work on surreal views of Southern U.S. themes and on poetically portraying childhood memories of natural scenery, buildings, and people, often working from old photographs found in his family albums.

Guy Northrop, in his introduction on page 24 to Hostile Butterflies and Other Paintings by Carroll Cloar (1977), quoted Cloar describing his images as "American faces, timeless dress and timeless customs ... the last of old America that isn't long for this earth". His Panther Bourne work depicted a surreal, Southern-mythic nature scene. Cloar employed pointillism in his painting "Waiting up for Lettie", creating over 800 works in his lifetime.

He moved to Memphis in 1930, attending Southwestern at Memphis (later known as Rhodes College) as an English major. His recurrent themes of a "homecoming", implying that the essential beauty of a locale is best understood by one who has left a beloved place behind and then returned, are echoed in his own personal experience of traveling abroad for years and then returning to the South. He began his travels in Europe after college, before returning to Memphis to study at Memphis College of Art. He studied at the Art Students League of New York from 1936 to 1940.

A series of lithographs he created in that period of the landscape and people of his Earle, Arkansas, hometown led to his receipt of a McDowell Traveling Fellowship in 1940. Cloar traveled throughout the western United States and Mexico until World War II began. He then joined the Army Air Forces for the war effort.

Cloar visited Mexico on a 1946 Guggenheim Fellowship. He traveled around Central and South America until 1950. His first one-man show was held in 1953 in Memphis. He moved permanently to Memphis in 1955, after determining the direction of his art was rooted in his Southern U.S. experience.

Cloar then completed 14 works in 1955, including the representative work, "My Father Was Big as a Tree". A New York showing in 1956 helped establish his career nationally. Tennessee museums later held more than 10 exhibitions of his works, while he also displayed his work in New York showings.

Cloar died in Memphis in 1993.

== Museums that have acquired Cloar's works ==
- Addison Gallery of American Art, Andover, MA
- Arkansas Arts Center, Little Rock, AR
- Art Museum of Sunrise, Charleston, WV
- Art Museum of The University of Memphis, Memphis, TN
- Brooklyn Museum of Fine Art, Brooklyn, NY
- Butler Institute of American Art, Youngstown, OH
- Bradbury Art Museum, Jonesboro, AR
- Carroll Reese Museum, Johnson City, TN
- Cheekwood Museum, Nashville, TN
- Crystal Bridges Museum of American Art, Bentonville, AR
- High Museum of Art, Atlanta, GA
- Hirshhorn Museum and Sculpture Garden, Washington, DC
- Historic Arkansas Museum, Little Rock, AR
- Library of Congress, Washington, DC
- Memphis Brooks Museum of Art, Memphis, TN
- Metropolitan Museum of Art, New York, NY
- Mississippi Museum of Art, Jackson, MS
- Montgomery Museum of Fine Arts, Montgomery, AL
- Museum of Fine Arts, Boston, MA
- Museum of Fine Arts, St. Petersburg, FL
- Neuberger Museum, Purchase, NY
- Newark Museum, Newark, NJ
- Rockford Art Gallery, Rockford, IL
- Rose Art Museum, Brandeis University, MA
- State University of New York, Albany, NY
- Tennessee Fine Arts Center at Cheekwood, Nashville, TN
- Tennessee State Museum, Nashville, TN
- Wadsworth Atheneum, Hartford, CT
- Whitney Museum, New York, NY
- Williams College Museum of Art, Williamstown, MA
- University of Memphis Libraries, Memphis, TN
