= Clarence Saunders =

American grocer

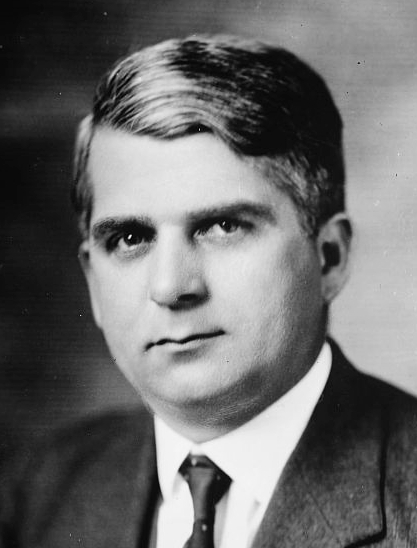
- Born: August 9, 1881; Amherst County, Virginia
- Died: October 14, 1953 (aged 72); Memphis, Tennessee
- Occupations: Entrepreneur; Grocer
- Known for: Founder of Piggly Wiggly; Founder of Keedoozle
- Spouse(s): Carolyn Amy Walker (m. 1903; div. 1928) Patricia Houston Bamberg (m. 1928)

Clarence Saunders (August 9, 1881 – October 14, 1953) was an American grocer who first developed the modern retail sales model of self service. His ideas have had a massive influence on the development of the modern supermarket. Saunders worked for most of his life trying to develop a truly automated store, developing Piggly Wiggly, Keedoozle, and Foodelectric store concepts.

== Early life ==
Saunders was born on a farm in Amherst County, Virginia, to Abram Warwick and Mary Gregory. Saunders' mother died when he was five. Abram had served in the Confederate army under Stonewall Jackson but had struggled financially in the aftermath of the war. In 1891, his father moved the family to Montgomery County, Tennessee, where his father worked as a laborer and sharecropper on a plantation near Palmyra, Tennessee. Saunders worked the plantation as well throughout his early childhood. By age 11, he was also working in a sawmill and limestone kiln during the summer and at a general store during the holidays. He received only two years of formal education in Palmyra, before quitting school entirely at 14 to work full-time for the general store. Saunders worked a variety of occupations over the next five years throughout the region, including shop assistant, night watchman and sawmill laborer. Recognizing the need for further education to advance, Saunders became a prolific reader and autodidact. At age 19, Saunders had moved to Clarksville, Tennessee, where he started working in the wholesale grocery business for John Hurst and Joseph Boillin, rapidly rising in the business.

In Clarksville Saunders met Carolyn Amy Walker, the daughter of a prominent Illinois attorney. Despite their contrasting backgrounds, they were married on 6 October 1903. The following year they moved to Memphis, Tennessee, where Saunders took up positions working for the wholesale grocers Shanks, Phillips & Co, as well as William Cole Early. Memphis in this period was booming — the population had soared from 33,000 in 1880 to more than 100,000 by the time the Saunders' arrived. A major river point and railroad junction between the north and south, Memphis was a key distributor of goods to towns and cities throughout the region, whilst cotton merchants often served the dual role of selling wholesale supplies to farms and plantations as well, such that wholesaling was one of the largest industries in Memphis and one of its most lucrative.

In February 1913, he created United Stores, Inc., with 21 retail customers, giving Shanks, Phillips control of wholesale purchasing and advertising. A jointly owned United Store was opened in June 1914. Saunders' three children, Lee, Clarence Jr., and Amy Carolyn, were born in 1906, 1909 and 1912 respectively.

== Piggly Wiggly ==
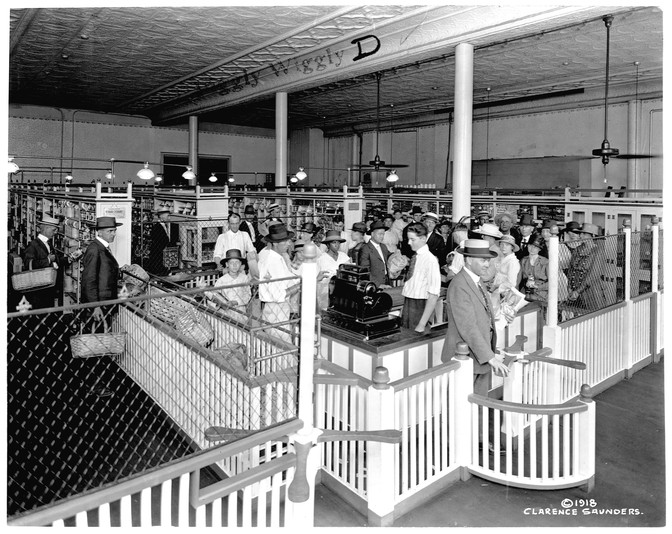
The original Piggly Wiggly Store, Memphis, Tennessee

On September 6, 1916, Saunders launched the self-service revolution in the United States by opening the first self-service Piggly Wiggly store, at 79 Jefferson Street in Memphis, Tennessee. Saunders had renovated his United Store, removing old countertops, and replacing them with characteristic turnstiles at the entrance and exit, and cabinets arranged along a continuous path, which ended at a cashier stand complete with adding machine and cash register. The 1,125 square feet (104.5 m^{2}) store included a front lobby, the continuous-path middle salesroom, and rear stockroom.

The store incorporated shopping baskets, self-service branded products, and checkouts at the front. Removing unnecessary clerks, creating elaborate aisle displays, and rearranging the store to force customers to view all of the merchandise in a continuous path, were just some of the characteristics of the early Piggly Wiggly stores. The store stocked four times the variety of items normally found in an ordinary grocery store, but did not offer fresh meat in the original store. A refrigerator separated two of the aisles, offering butter and cheese. Bins offered fruits and vegetables, while flour and other bulk goods were pre-packaged and placed near the end of the shopper's journey through the aisles. The concept of the "Self-Serving Store" patent was filed by Saunders on October 21, 1916, and granted on October 9, 1917 as Patent #1,242,872. Three new patent applications followed, including Patent #1,357,521 for the basic store design. Patent #1,297,405 was filed on February 5, 1918 and granted on March 18, 1919, which covered his means of tagging prices next to the grocery item. He was also granted a patent for his idea of giving shoppers a printed receipt from the adding machine tape.

Saunders then listed Piggly Wiggly shares on the New York Stock Exchange in February 1922. In April of 1922, the company sold 50,000 new shares on the market at $43 a share.

In 1921, there were 615 stores in 200 cities and 40 states. By 1923, Piggly Wiggly had grown into 1,267 stores, 667 owned by the company and the rest owned by franchisees. The company employed 250 people in Memphis. Stock in Piggly Wiggly Stores, Inc., paid a dividend of 11%.

The success of Piggly Wiggly encouraged a raft of imitators, including Handy Andy stores, Helpy Selfy stores, Mick-or-Mack stores and Jitney Jungle, all of which operated under patented systems.

== Wall Street raid ==
In the early 1920s Saunders began construction of a pink marble mansion in Memphis. Then, in early 1923, a group of franchised outlets in New York failed. Merrill Lynch and other speculators on Wall Street attempted a bear raid on the price of Piggly Wiggly stock, gambling the price would fall. With a loan of $10 million from a number of Southern bankers, plus a bit of his own money, Saunders counteracted by buying a large amount of Piggly Wiggly stock in hopes of driving up the price. He flamboyantly declared his intent in newspaper ads. Saunders bought Piggly Wiggly stock until he had orders for 196,000 of the 200,000 outstanding shares. The firm's share price went from a low of $39 in late 1922 to $124 by March 20, 1923. Pressured by the 'bears', the New York Stock Exchange declared a 'corner' existed (see cornering the market), and gave the 'bears' five days rather than the usual 24 hours to deliver the stock Saunders had bought. The additional time meant "a flood of stock poured [in] from distant points and gave the shorts opportunity to deliver."

In the words of John Brooks, "...in mid-August, with the September 1st deadline for repayment of two and a half million dollars on his loan staring him in the face and with nothing like that amount of cash either on hand or in prospect, he resigned as president of Piggly Wiggly Stores, Inc., and turned over his assets—his stock in the company, his Pink Palace, and all the rest of his property—to his creditors."

The Pink Palace mansion eventually became Memphis' first museum in 1930.

== Sole Owner stores ==
In 1928, Saunders went on to create the Clarence Saunders, Sole Owner of My Name Stores, Inc. grocery chain. The chain, which was known to the public as Sole Owner stores, initially flourished. However the chain went into bankruptcy in 1930 during the Great Depression.

== The Tigers football team ==
In the late 1920s, to promote his newest grocery venture, Saunders founded a professional football team. The full name of the team was the Clarence Saunders Sole Owner of My Name Tigers, but it was usually just called The Tigers. The Tigers played professional teams from around the country, including the Chicago Bears and the Green Bay Packers. In 1929, the Tigers beat the Green Bay Packers 20–6. In 1930 the National Football League invited The Tigers to join their organization, but Saunders refused their offer. It is said that Saunders disbanded his football team because he did not like to travel to other cities for away games.

== Keedoozle ==
On November 22, 1935, Saunders chartered the prototype of an automated store. He named it Keedoozle, which some assumed stood for "key does it all", but Saunders stated was just made up, as was Piggly Wiggly.

The Keedoozle was an automated store, similar to very large vending machine, or Automat. Merchandise was displayed as single units, each within a glass cabinet with a keyhole beneath. Customers entering the store were given a key that they placed in the keyhole below the goods they wished to buy. The quantity desired was determined by the number of times the key was inserted in the slot. This action, recorded the item on punched tape in the key, and automatically moved the item via conveyor belt to the front of the store. Upon reaching the exit gate at the front of the store, an attendant deciphered the customer's tape and produced the bill. After payment, the customer's groceries were delivered, bagged and wrapped. Pilot stores operated in Memphis and Chicago, but the complex and expensive system could not compete with shopping carts.

Saunders developed two versions of the Keedoozle. The first was in 1937, which was abandoned when the US entered World War II. Saunders returned to the idea in 1948, opening an improved version. Saunders sold twelve franchises of the revised concept. In 1949 he predicted "In five years there will be a thousand Keedoozles throughout the US, selling $5 billion worth of goods."

== Foodelectric ==
At the time of his death, Saunders was developing plans for another automatic store system called the "Foodelectric". The Foodelectric concept is a clear predecessor to self checkout. Saunders described it as follows:

The store operates so automatically that the customer can collect her groceries herself, wrap them and act as her own cashier. It eliminates the checkout crush, cuts overhead expenses and enables a small staff to handle a tremendous volume... I can handle a $2 million volume with only eight employees.

The central invention was a primitive computer, or "shopping brain" which was loaned to the shopper, who then roamed among the store's glass-enclosed items.

The store, which was to be located two blocks from the first Piggly Wiggly store in downtown Memphis, never opened.

== Personal life ==
Clarence and Carolyn divorced on September 27, 1928, and Clarence married Patricia Houston Bamberg on December 20, 1928.

During World War II, Saunders made toy wagons, baby strollers and broomsticks.

He died of heart failure in 1953.

== Miscellaneous ==
Saunders was one of the first to use newspaper advertising to campaign for a political candidate, at least in Tennessee. He campaigned for Austin Peay, an acquaintance from his hometown, Clarksville, Tennessee. Peay won in 1922 and gave credit to Saunders' advertising. When Governor Peay ran for a third term in 1926 (Tennessee governors held office for two-year terms at the time) Saunders inexplicably opposed him, using newspaper ads to denounce his former friend. In 1928 Saunders backed Henry Horton for Governor against Hill McAlister. Memphis political leader E. H. Crump backed McAlister. The candidates were completely overshadowed by the newspaper advertising war waged by Saunders and Crump. Their feud was personal and striking, since few in Memphis had dared challenge Crump, one of the legendary city bosses in American politics. After 1928 Saunders' fortunes declined, and he did not write political ads again.

== Patent ==
- U.S. patent 1,242,872 - Self-serving store—C. Saunders
