= Piggly Wiggly =

American supermarket chain

Piggly Wiggly, LLC

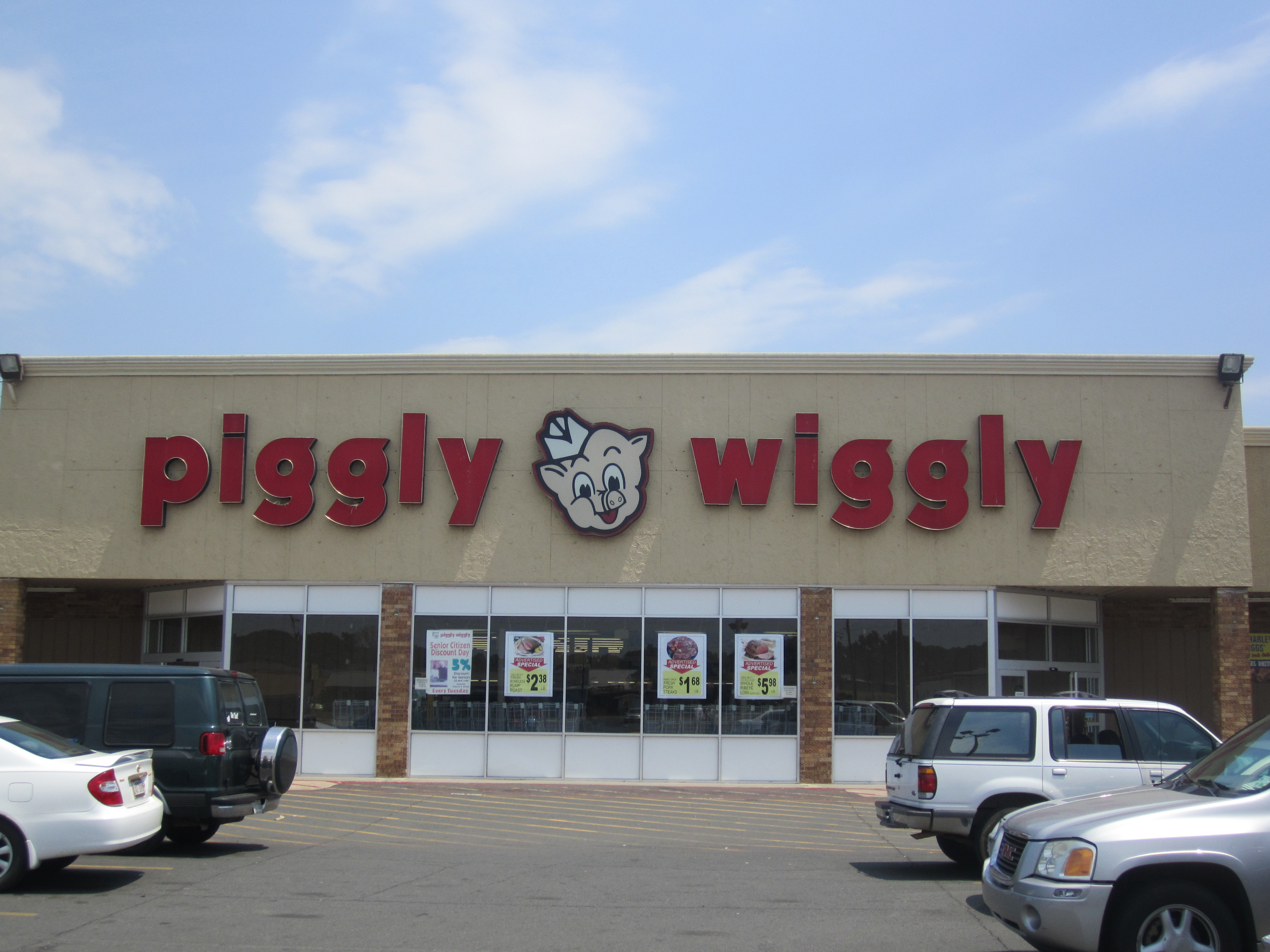
- Piggly Wiggly store in Springhill, Louisiana, August 2011
- Trade name: Piggly Wiggly
- Type: Subsidiary
- Industry: Retail
- Founded: September 6, 1916 (110 years ago) in Memphis, Tennessee, U.S.
- Founder: Clarence Saunders
- Headquarters: Keene, New Hampshire, U.S.
- Number of locations: 503 (2023)
- Areas served: Southeast; Midwest
- Products: Bakery, dairy, deli, frozen foods, grocery, meat, pharmacy, produce, seafood, snacks
- Services: Supermarket
- Parent: C&S Wholesale Grocers (Note: C&S owns the trademark. All locations are franchised and are owned and operated independently by several different owners.)
- Website: pigglywiggly.com

Piggly Wiggly, LLC is an American supermarket chain operating in the American Southern and Midwestern regions. Its first outlet opened in 1916 in Memphis, Tennessee, and was the first true self-service grocery store, and the originator of various familiar supermarket features, such as checkout stands and individual item price marking.

The company is currently headquartered in Keene, New Hampshire, although no Piggly Wiggly-branded stores operate in that state. As of 2024, 503 independently owned Piggly Wiggly stores operated in 18 states, primarily in smaller cities and towns.

Piggly Wiggly operations in the U.S. as of 2018 Piggly Wiggly 1–10 locations 10–50 locations 50–100 locations 100+ locations Piggly Wiggly Midwest 1–10 locations 50–100 locations

== History ==
=== Founding ===
Piggly Wiggly was the first self-service grocery store. It was founded by Clarence Saunders on September 6, 1916 (although it did not open until five days later due to delays in construction), at 79 Jefferson Avenue in Memphis, Tennessee. A replica of the original store has been constructed in the Memphis Pink Palace Museum and Planetarium, a mansion that Saunders built as his private residence, which was later sold to the city.

At the time of its founding, grocery stores did not allow customers to gather their goods. Instead, a customer would give a list of items to a clerk, who would then collect them throughout the store. Piggly Wiggly introduced the innovation of allowing customers to go through the store, gathering their goods. Losses due to easier shoplifting were more than offset by profits from increased impulse purchasing. Others were initially experimenting with this format, which came to be known as a "groceteria", reminding people of cafeterias, another relatively new, self-service idea.

Piggly Wiggly Corporation secured the self-service format and issued franchises to hundreds of grocery retailers to operate its stores. The concept of the "self-serving store" was patented by Saunders in 1917. Customers at Piggly Wiggly entered the store through a turnstile and walked through four aisles to view the 605 items sold in packages and organized into departments. The customers selected merchandise as they continued through the maze to the cashier. Instantly, packaging and brand recognition became important to companies and consumers alike.

Piggly Wiggly was the first company to use point of sale lanes for payment.

=== 1920s and 1930s ===
The success of Piggly Wiggly was phenomenal, and other independent and chain grocery stores changed to self-service in the 1920s and 1930s. At its peak in 1932, the company operated 2,660 stores and posted annual sales in excess of $180 million. In November 1922, Saunders attempted a short squeeze on the substantial short interest in the stock, running the share price up from 40 to 120 and profiting by millions on paper. The Stock Exchange Governors responded by deciding that a corner had been established in Piggly Wiggly and removed the stock from the Board, eventually forcing Saunders to turn over his assets to the banks that had financed his leveraged position. Saunders reputedly lost $9 million in the attempted corner.

Following these events, the company was divided into strategic units, which were sold to regional grocery chains, including Kroger, Safeway, National Tea, and Colonial. In 1935, all 179 Canadian Piggly Wiggly were also sold to the Canadian Safeway division, which merged with Sobeys in 2013.

After losing control of Piggly Wiggly, Saunders had no further association with the company. However, he remained interested in automated shopping, with which he experimented initially with the Keedoozle store until he died in 1953.

According to John Brooks, Piggly Wiggly's "greatly changed corporate structure ... flourished into the 1960s", and hundreds of stores operated under a franchise agreement with the Piggly Wiggly Corporation of Jacksonville, Florida.

=== Name and logo ===
According to the Piggly Wiggly website, Saunders was "reluctant" to explain the origin of the company's name. One story recounts that while riding a train, he looked out his window and saw several little pigs struggling to get under a fence, which prompted him to think of the rhyme. Someone once asked him why he had chosen such an unusual name for his organization, to which he replied, "So people will ask that very question".

American artist George Condo painted the "Piggly Wiggly" logo as part of his Memphis Series.

== Present company ==
Piggly Wiggly was acquired by the wholesale grocer Malone & Hyde in 1982. Malone & Hyde was acquired by Fleming Companies in 1988. Fleming filed for bankruptcy in 2003, and C&S Wholesale Grocers acquired most of the business, including Piggly Wiggly. C&S acquired regional warehouses Piggly Wiggly Carolina in 2013 and Piggly Wiggly Midwest in 2021.

There are more than 500 independently owned and operated stores in 18 states. The company headquarters is located in Keene, New Hampshire. Some of the stores in Alabama have formed Piggly Wiggly Alabama Distributing Company, a retailers' cooperative to manage distribution while using the Piggly Wiggly name.

== Gallery ==
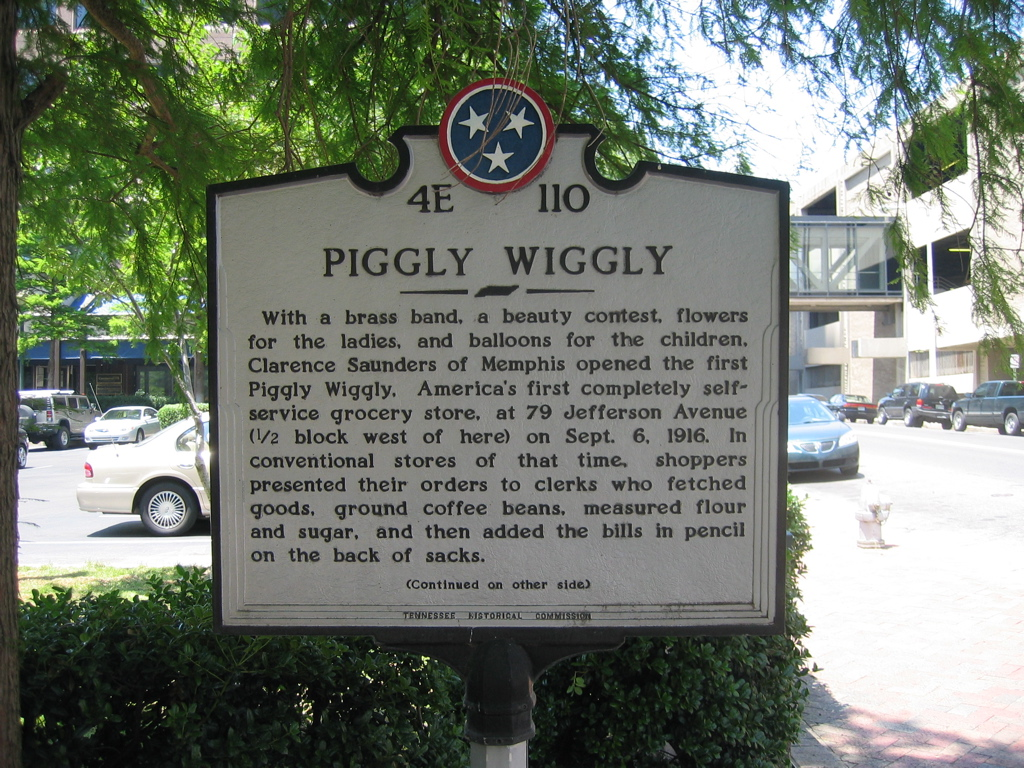
Historical marker near the site of the first Piggly Wiggly store in Memphis, Tennessee

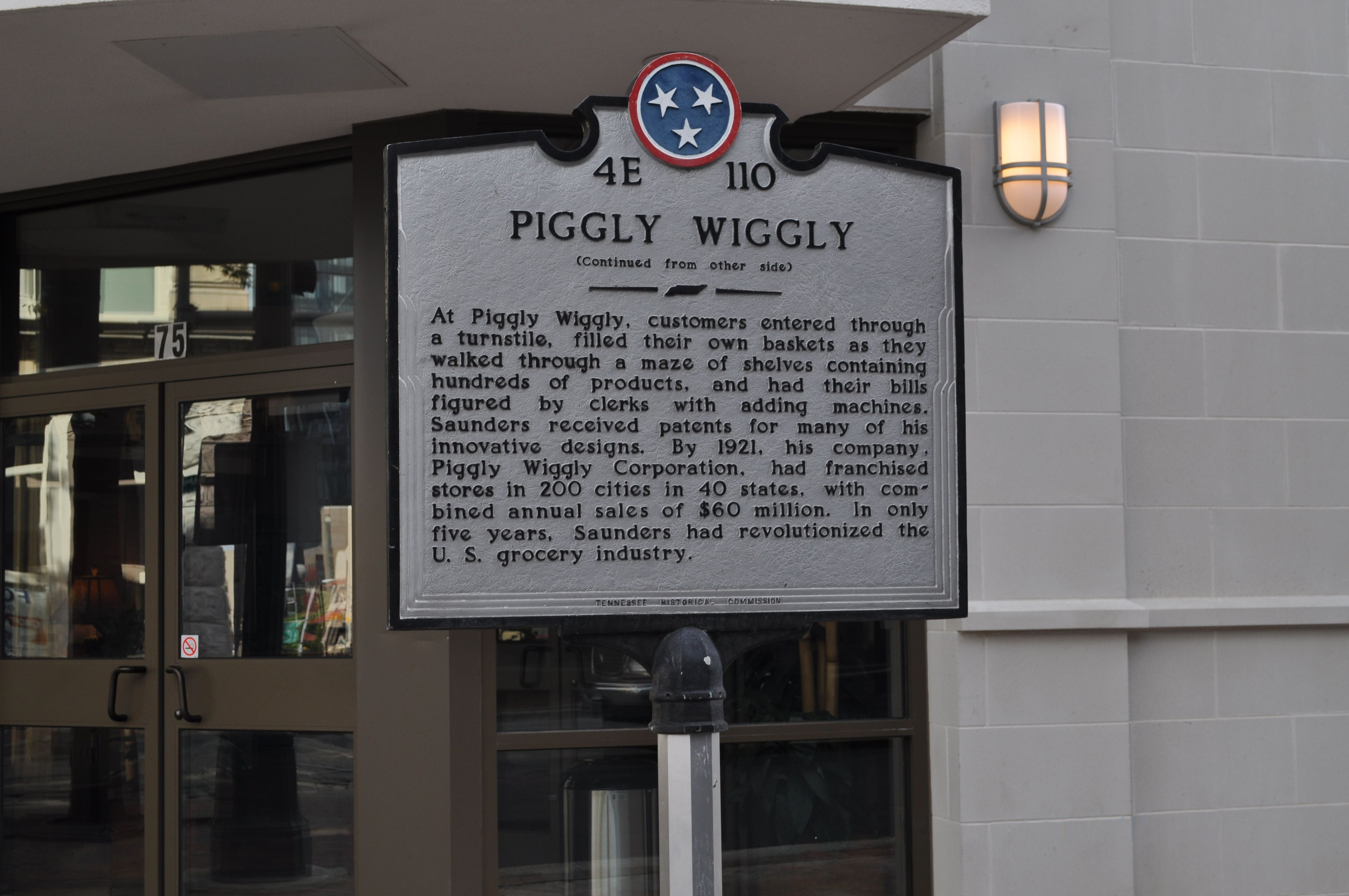
Historical marker near the site of the first Piggly Wiggly store in Memphis, Tennessee, reverse side

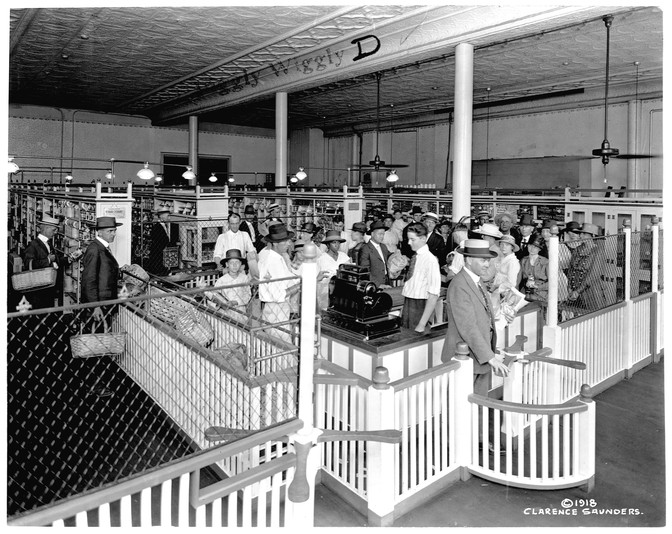
The original Piggly Wiggly Store, Memphis, Tennessee, 1918

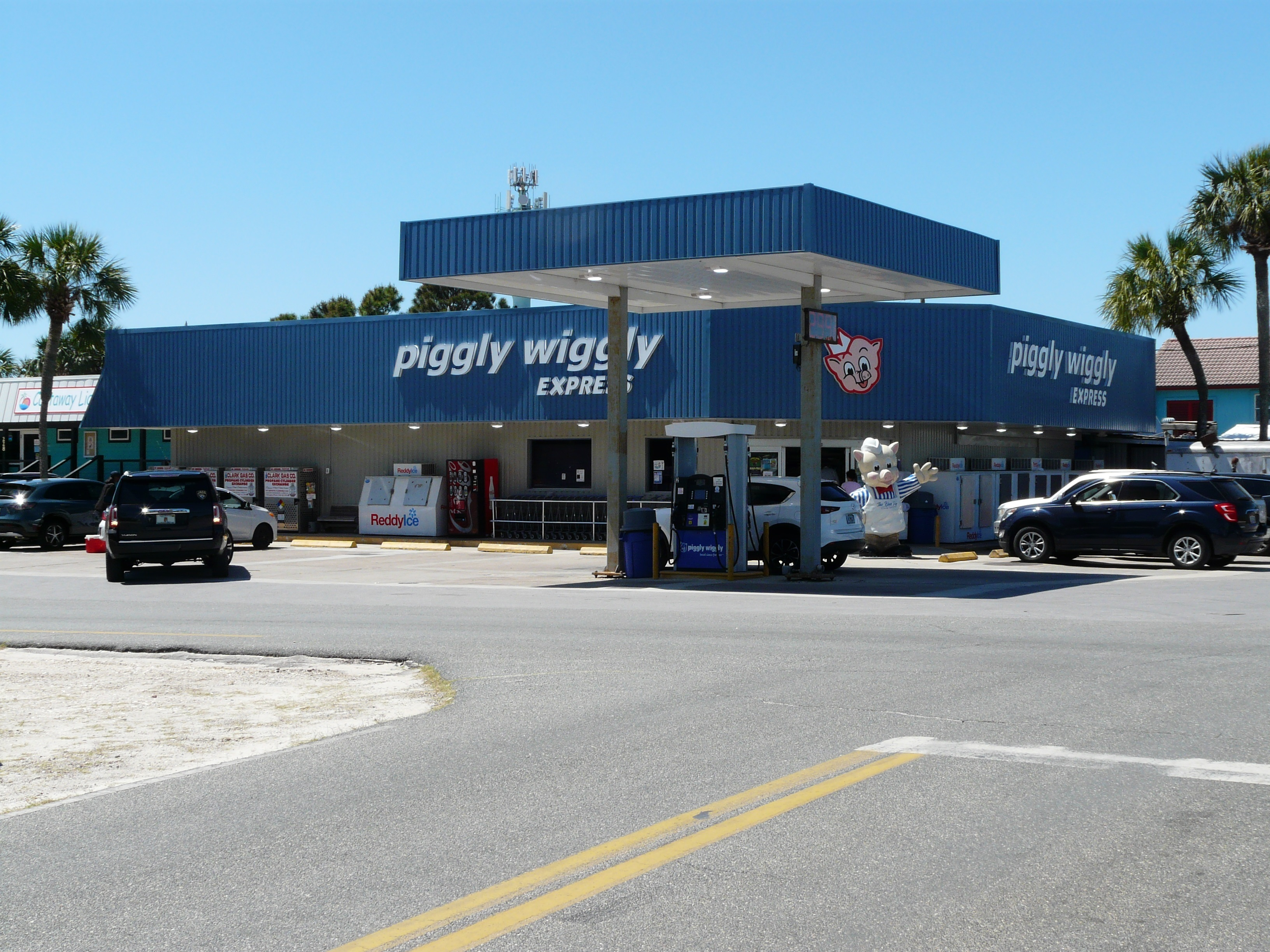
Piggly Wiggly Express on St. George Island, Florida in April 2025

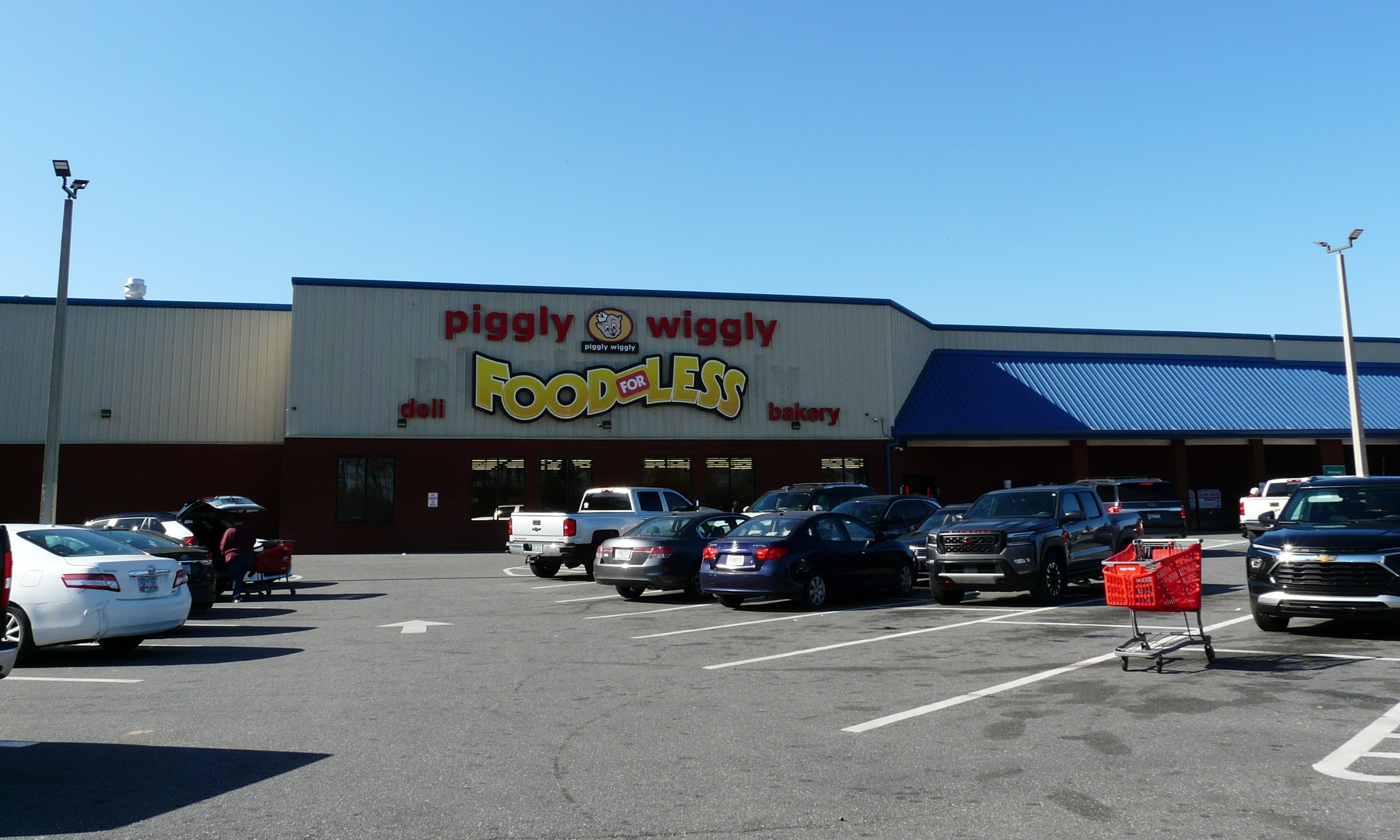
"Food for Less" subbranded store in Donalsonville, Georgia in December 2025

== See also ==
- Houchens Industries
- Supermarkets in the United States
