= Pink Palace Museum and Planetarium =

Museum in Memphis, Tennessee, US

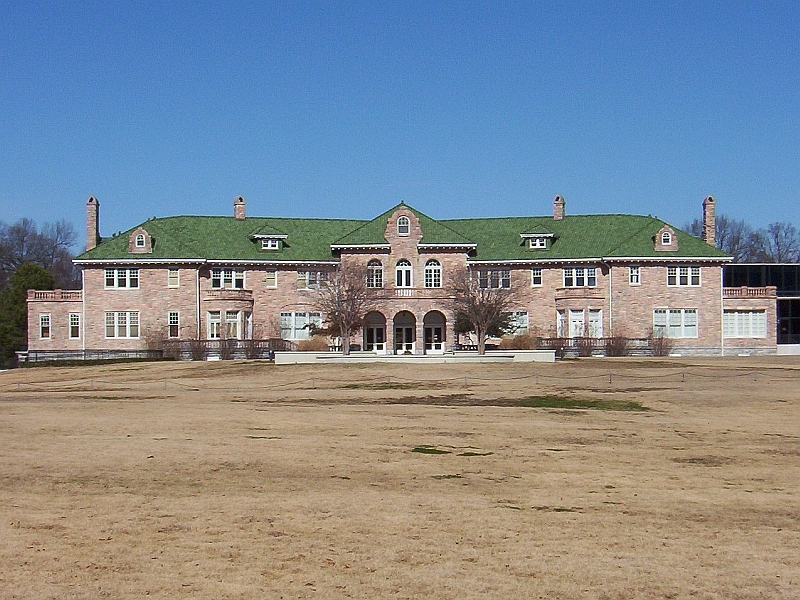
- Established: 1930
- Location: Memphis, Tennessee, U.S.
- Coordinates: 35.12543°N 89.95924°W
- Type: Local history museum Natural history museum
- Accreditation: American Alliance of Museums
- Website: moshmemphis.com/explore/pink-palace-mansion/

The Pink Palace Museum & Mansion is a local and natural history museum in Memphis, Tennessee. The museum features exhibits ranging from archeology to chemistry as well as a large theater and a planetarium. Over 240,000 people visit the Pink Palace each year. The museum is part of the Memphis Museums of Science and History, a collection of historic, educational, and technological attractions maintained by the City of Memphis and Memphis Museums, Inc.

== History ==
The Pink Palace was initially constructed in 1923 as the residence of Clarence Saunders, the founder of Piggly Wiggly. It was built out of pink Georgian marble. However, Saunders sold the incomplete home to the City of Memphis in 1928 after becoming bankrupt due to financial reversals on Wall Street.

In March 1930, after the Stock Market Crash, the Memphis Museum of Natural History and Industrial Arts opened in the mansion. The original exhibits featured stuffed animals and birds, dolls, anthropological items from local wealthy collectors, as well as items related to Memphis' history, particularly Confederate military uniforms and memorabilia.

On February 26, 1977, the new $5-million annex opened with a preview banquet.

In 2021, the museum was rebranded as Museum of Science and History - Pink Palace to emphasize the shared management with the other museums in the system. However, the name was reverted in 2024.

== Exhibits ==
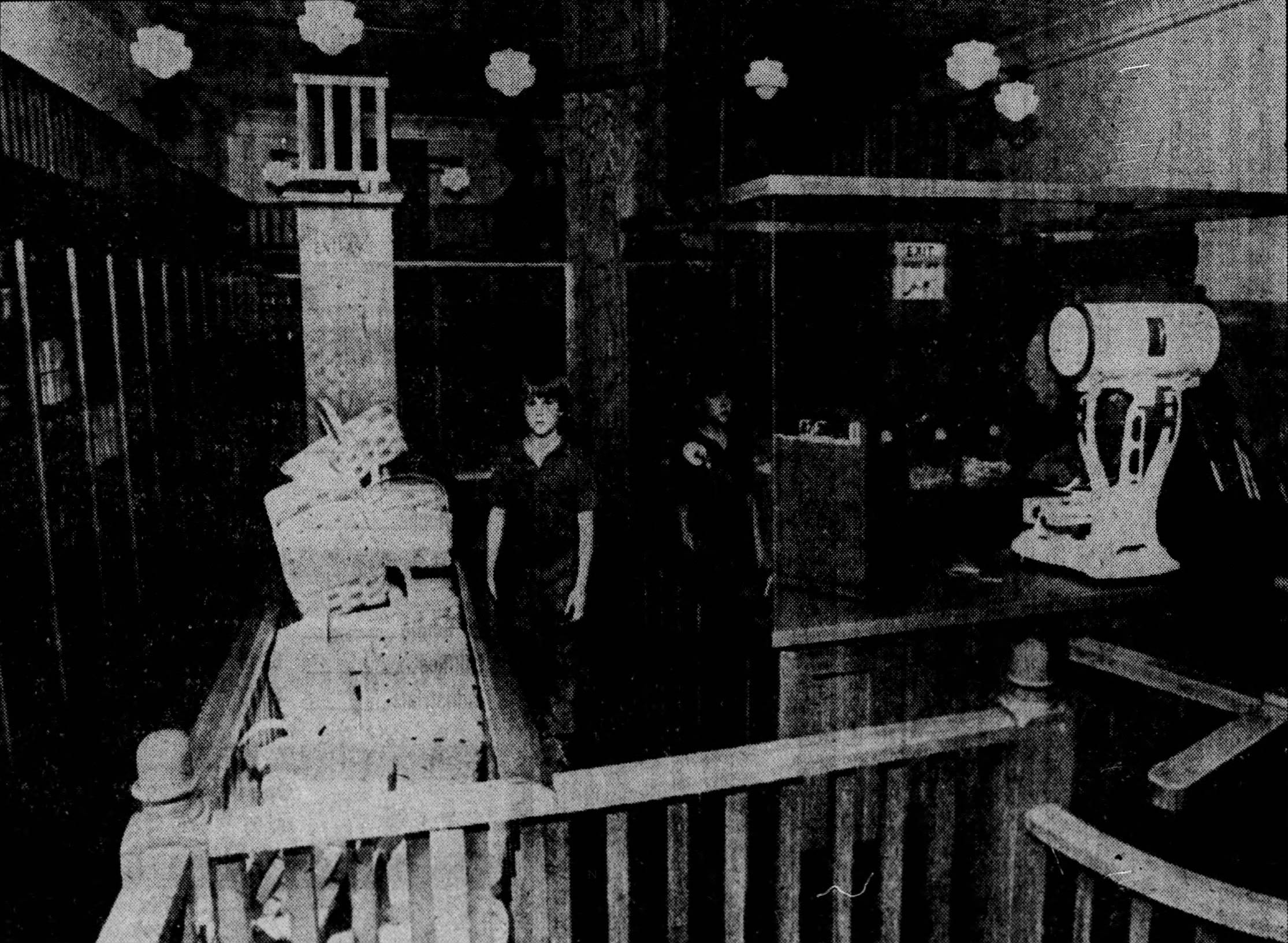
The Piggly Wiggly replica in 1980

The museum contains a variety of exhibits relating to Memphis history. One exhibit features a replica of the original Piggly Wiggly store, the first self-service grocery store, commemorating the invention of the supermarket by Memphian Clarence Saunders in 1916. Other permanent exhibits include 15th century Native American pottery, pre-Columbian artifacts, Clyde Parke's Miniature Circus, fossils and dinosaurs, and mounted animals. History exhibits focus on the roles of music and cotton on Memphis, the Civil War, the changing roles of women, and historic Black Memphians. The museum features several special exhibits each year.

== Planetarium and theater ==
The Sharpe Planetarium, housed at the museum, features an 145-seat theater-in-the-round auditorium and offers public shows that project star fields, visual images, and laser lights on a domed ceiling. The Spotlight Giant Theater opened on January 21, 1995, and features a four-story high movable screen.

== Murals ==
The original main entrance lobby of the Museum Mansion features a three-panel mural by Memphis artist Burton Callicott. The murals commemorate the discovery of the Mississippi River near the site of Memphis by the Spanish conquistador Hernando de Soto and his men, and their encounters with Native Americans. The three murals were commissioned in 1934 by the Public Works of Art Project of President Franklin D. Roosevelt's government, as part of a series of numerous art and public works projects to employ artists and others during the Great Depression. Callicott, who died in 2004, taught at the Memphis College of Art.

== See also ==
- List of museums in Tennessee
