= Keedoozle =

First automated American grocery store

Clarence Saunders' first self-service grocery store, concept developed in 1949 into the first fully automated grocery store, "Keedoozle" - Key Does All.

Clarence Saunders' first self-service Keedoozle grocery store supply room

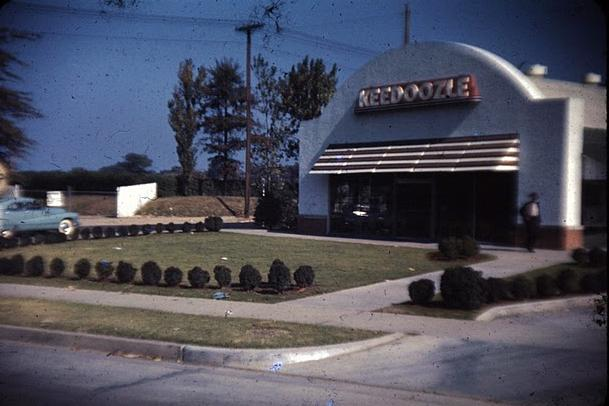
Keedoozle automated grocery store in Memphis, Tennessee. Photo taken by Paul Robert Alvey Family in 1948

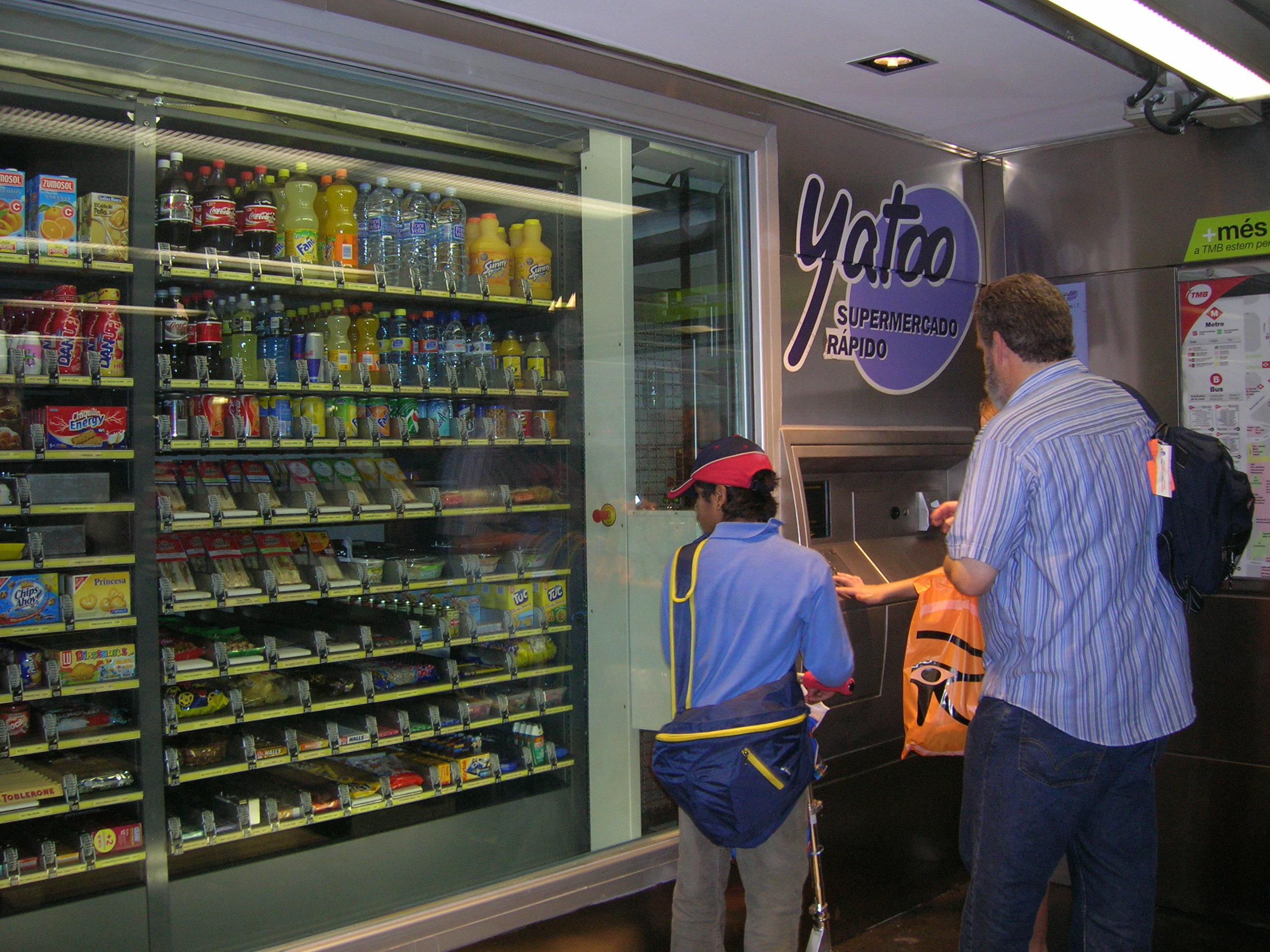
Barcelona Spain 2006 - automated grocery store

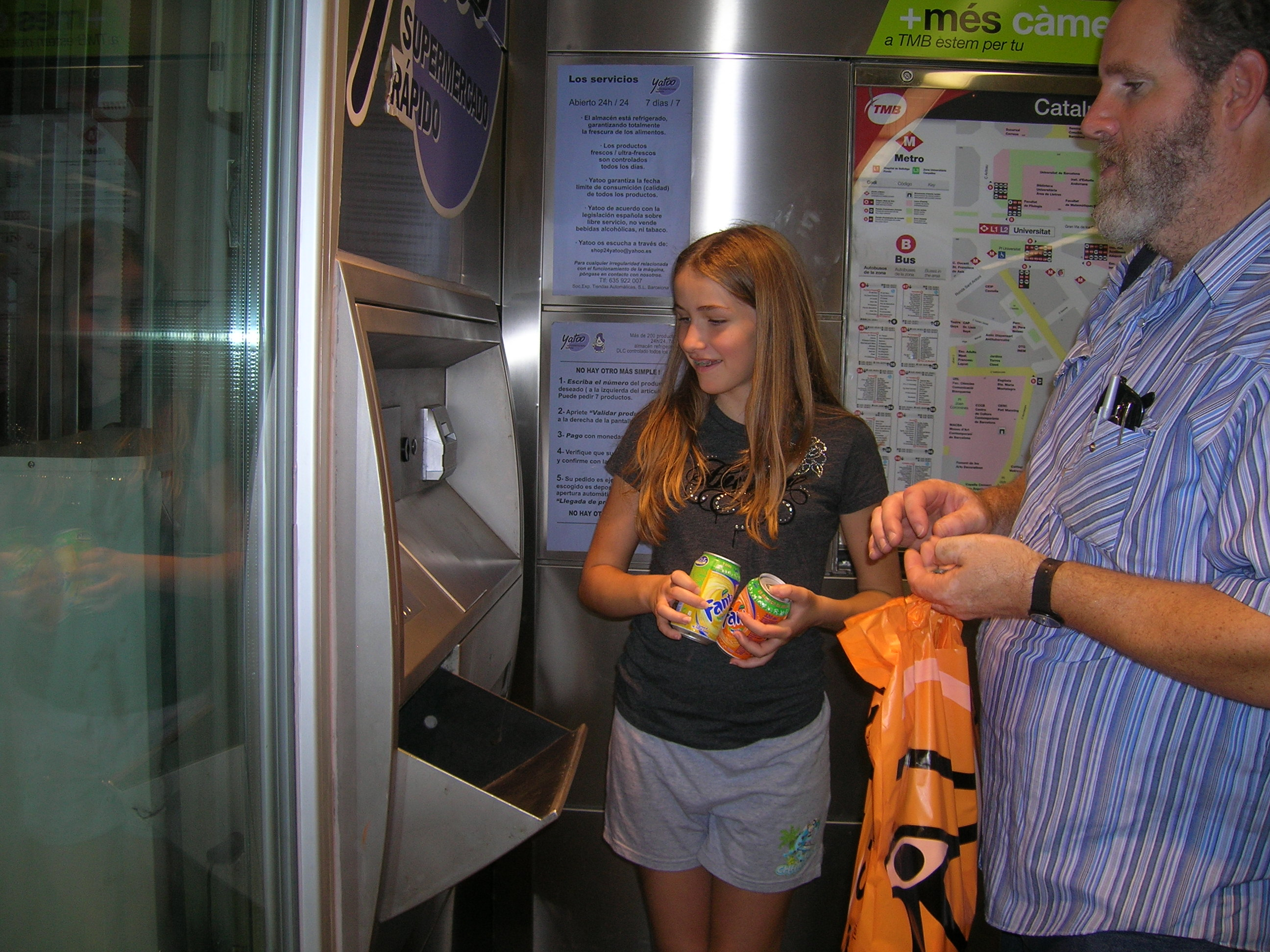
Automated grocery store in Barcelona metro 2006

Keedoozle was the first fully automated grocery store in the United States, a vending machine concept developed by grocer Clarence Saunders in 1937. It is often held that the name "Keedoozle" was coined by Saunders to refer to the technology used, in which a "Key Does All" for the grocery shopper, but another interview with Saunders appears to contradict this.

The Keedoozle concept was intended to be a grocery shopper labor-saving and cost-saving device. These groceries were offered at a cost of 10% - 15% below the going rate. The Keedoozle store sold mostly dry goods at a half a penny to three cents over cost. Saunders developed this concept from his self-service Piggly Wiggly grocery store concept.

Saunders' Keedoozle was a prototype for a store for automatic dispensing of groceries and registering the total cost at the pick up counter. Sample merchandise was displayed behind rows of little display cabinets of glass boxes. Shoppers selected their merchandise with a key given to them initially. Customers then put the key in labeled keyholes at the merchandise display and selected the quantity.

Electric circuits caused perforations to be cut in a ticker tape attached to the face of the customer's key. The customer then took the punched out tape to the cashier for processing. The cashier would insert the tape into a reading mechanism that would electronically read it. That set off electrical and electronic circuits which started the goods sliding down conveyor belts and did the cost tallying in the process.

The key-activated mechanism was not completely automated, however. Their groceries were hidden behind stockroom walls and refrigeration units. Stock personnel had put their selected items onto conveyor belts physically that in turn moved to the cashier for check out. A mechanism added up the tally for the customer's total bill. The shoppers picked up their groceries all wrapped up or boxed accordingly when they paid.

== Technology ==
The Keedoozle idea was too complicated, which led to its demise. Contemporary technology was unable to handle the concept. Circuits got mixed up easily and shoppers got the wrong merchandise. The conveyor belt system was not capable of handling such a high traffic load, especially at peak times.

Another reason given for these failures was that it was too far ahead of the buying habits of the public. One quote from journal Automation in Marketing said that it was just too much for the average mind to grasp; too far in advance of the public thinking. Saunders received posthumously the 1958 U.S. patent 2,820,591 for the Keedoozle technology concept.

The concept instead has evolved into the self checkout shopping environment. Historians say Saunders' concept was fifty years ahead of its time. Some say the concept could likely return. Automation in Marketing said that "the technology exists, and the mood in America is ripe for this concept."

== Stores ==
Three Keedoozle stores total were built. The first Keedoozle store was opened in Memphis, Tennessee, on May 15, 1937, by the Keedoozle Corporation of which Saunders was president. This first store closed after a few months because the mechanical technology was not capable of handling the high traffic loads. This store reopened in 1939 in the same location but failed again for the same reason.

The third store built in 1948 was at the corner of Poplar and Union Extended in Memphis. It was open for a little over a year and also failed for the same reason as the first two attempts. This third and final store has since been torn down.

== See also ==
- Automated retail

== Bibliography ==
- Segrave, Kerry, Vending Machines, McFarland (2002), ISBN 0-7864-1369-7
- Mayo, Anthony J. et al., In Their Time, Harvard Business Press (2005), ISBN 1-59139-345-0
