= Burton Callicott =

American painter

Burton Callicott (1907–2003) was an American artist in Memphis, Tennessee and teacher at the Memphis Academy of Art, later known as the Memphis College of Art. Callicott was one of the founders, in 1937, and served as Professor Emeritus into the 1980s. He completed the murals Pink Palace Museum and Planetarium, said to be the last of the WPA artwork extant in Memphis, Tennessee.
