= Memphis Brooks Museum of Art =

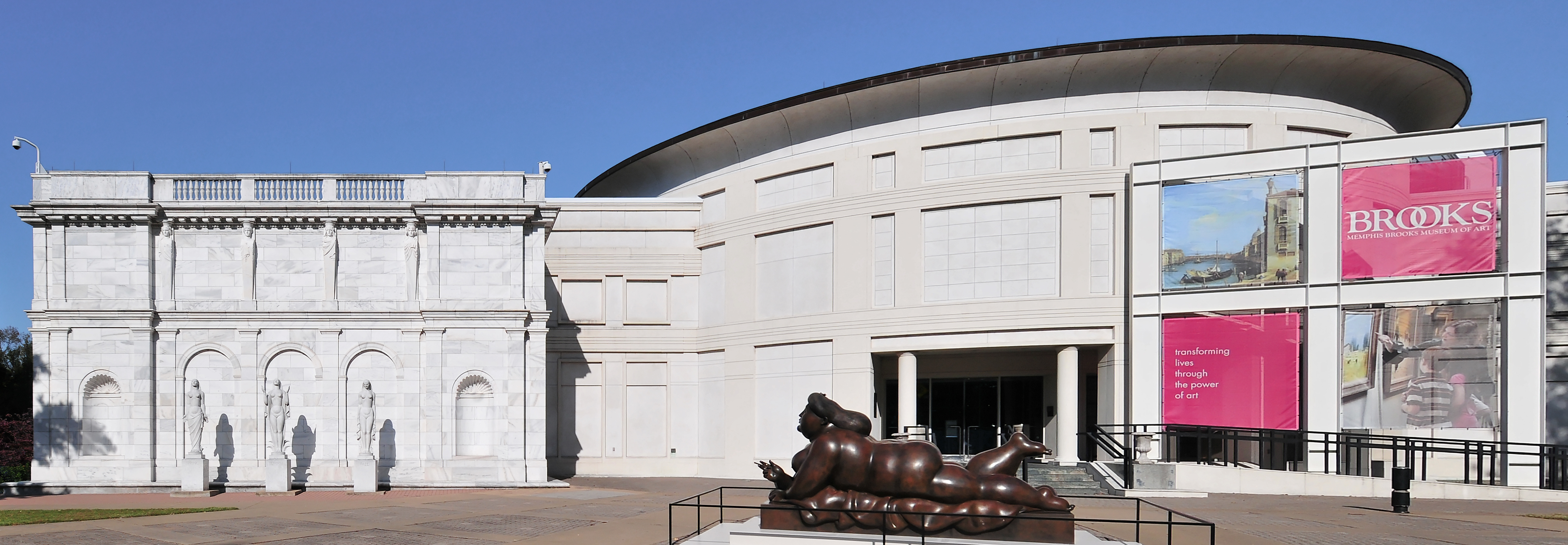
- Memphis Brooks Museum of Art. Fernando Botero's Smoking Woman is looking to the Three Graces of Memphis
- Established: 1916
- Location: 1934 Poplar Avenue, Memphis, Tennessee
- Coordinates: 35.144343°N 89.995155°W
- Type: Art museum
- Director: Mark Resnick
- Public transit access: MATA
- Website: http://www.brooksmuseum.org/

Memphis Brooks Museum of Art is an art museum in Memphis, Tennessee. The Brooks Museum, which was founded in 1916, is the oldest and largest art museum in the state of Tennessee. The museum is a privately funded nonprofit institution located in Overton Park in Midtown Memphis.

== History and structure ==
=== Overton Park complex ===
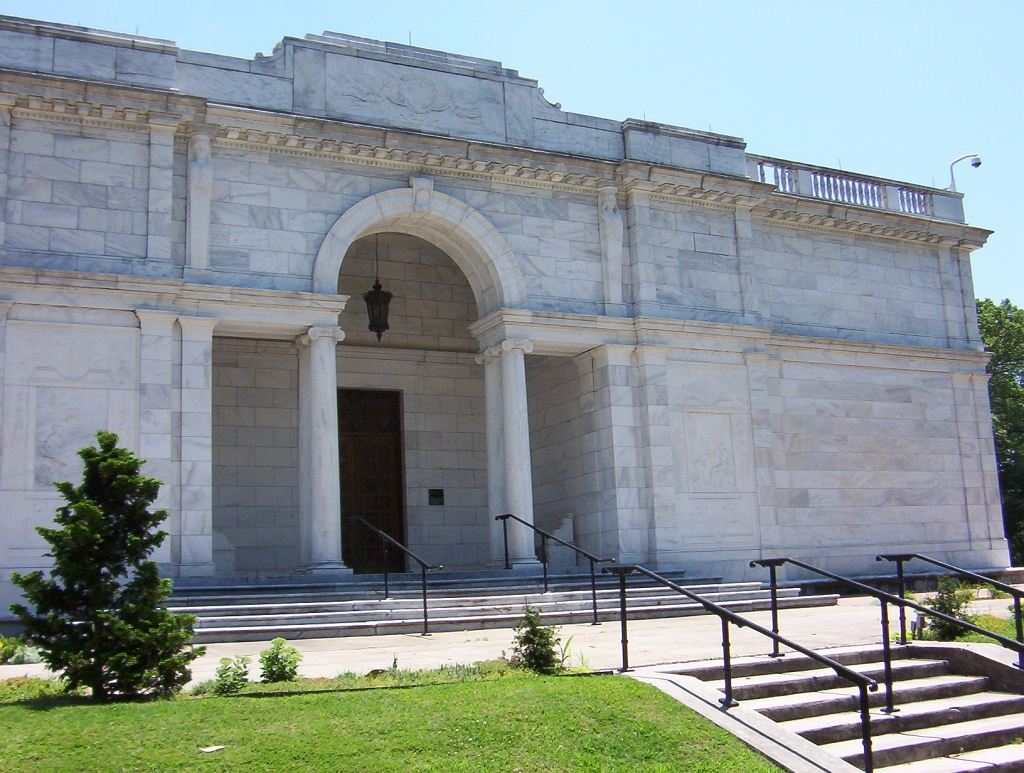
Recessed loggia entrance behind a Serlian screen of the original building by James Gamble Rogers, 1915

The original Beaux-Arts building, designed by James Gamble Rogers in 1913, was built with funds donated by Bessie Vance Brooks in memory of her husband, Samuel Hamilton Brooks. Opened to the public in 1916, it is a registered U.S. National Landmark. The cylindrical extension, opened in 1955, was designed by Memphis architect Everett Woods. In 1989, the building was expanded and reoriented by Askew Nixon Ferguson (ANF) Architects & Skidmore, Owings and Merrill. The expansion, which doubled the square footage of the existing building, included a new public entrance as well as a three-story gallery space where the old and new buildings join.

The facility consists of 29 galleries, art classrooms, a print study room with over 4,500 works of art on paper, a research library with over 5,000 volumes, and an auditorium. The collection has over ten thousand works of art, including paintings, sculptures, drawings, prints, photographs, and examples of the decorative arts. Of particular note are the Samuel H. Kress Collection of Renaissance and Baroque paintings, the Hugo N. Dixon Collection of Impressionist paintings, the Levy Collection of American prints, the Goodman Book Collection, and the Goodheart Collection of Carl Gutherz paintings, drawings, and archival material. The Brooks facilities also include the Brooks Museum Store, Cafe Brooks by City + State, the Holly Court garden, and a grand terrace that overlooks the greens and trees of Overton Park.

In December 1960, following continued pressure from local sit in activists, the Memphis Brooks Museum of Art, which was at the time known as the Brooks Memorial Art Gallery Museum, would be racially desegregated by the Memphis Parks Commission.

=== Downtown museum ===
Beginning in a new 11,475-square-meter adjunct building has been under construction in downtown Memphis. The design team included architectural firm Herzog & de Meuron. The "downtown" museum is scheduled to open in December 2026. The facility will include a public courtyard, a rooftop sculpture garden, a theater, galleries, and spaces from which to view the Mississippi River.

== Permanent collection ==
Paintings in the permanent collection include works by Italian Renaissance, Baroque, Impressionist, and 20th-century artists. The Kress Collection is one of numerous collections of paintings distributed by this philanthropist among American museums. The Brooks also has a fine collection of English portraits, including works by Gainsborough, Reynolds, Lawrence, and Romney. There are impressionist works by Camille Pissarro, Renoir, and many American impressionists: Winslow Homer, Thomas Hart Benton, Childe Hassam, and Robert Henri. The contemporary collection includes paintings by Kenneth Noland, Robert Motherwell, Mark Kostabi and Nancy Graves, plus the nationally known Memphis artist Carroll Cloar.

The Brooks Museum also conserves a selection of 19th and 20th century sculpture and decorative arts, including furniture and textiles.

== See also ==
- List of museums in Tennessee
