= National Register of Historic Places listings in Shelby County, Tennessee =

Location of Shelby County in Tennessee

This is a list of the National Register of Historic Places listings in Shelby County, Tennessee.

This is intended to be a complete list of the properties and districts on the National Register of Historic Places in Shelby County, Tennessee, United States. Latitude and longitude coordinates are provided for many National Register properties and districts; these locations may be seen together in a map.

There are 206 properties and districts listed on the National Register in the county, including 4 National Historic Landmarks. There are 24 properties that have been removed from the register.

Contents: Counties in Tennessee
Anderson – Bedford – Benton – Bledsoe – Blount – Bradley – Campbell – Cannon – Carroll – Carter – Cheatham – Chester – Claiborne – Clay – Cocke – Coffee – Crockett – Cumberland – Davidson – Decatur – DeKalb – Dickson – Dyer – Fayette – Fentress – Franklin – Gibson – Giles – Grainger – Greene – Grundy – Hamblen – Hamilton – Hancock – Hardeman – Hardin – Hawkins – Haywood – Henderson – Henry – Hickman – Houston – Humphreys – Jackson – Jefferson – Johnson – Knox – Lake – Lauderdale – Lawrence – Lewis – Lincoln – Loudon – Macon – Madison – Marion – Marshall – Maury – McMinn – McNairy – Meigs – Monroe – Montgomery – Moore – Morgan – Obion – Overton – Perry – Pickett – Polk – Putnam – Rhea – Roane – Robertson – Rutherford – Scott – Sequatchie – Sevier – Shelby – Smith – Stewart – Sullivan – Sumner – Tipton – Trousdale – Unicoi – Union – Van Buren – Warren – Washington – Wayne – Weakley – White – Williamson – Wilson

This National Park Service list is complete through NPS recent listings posted June 26, 2026.

== Current listings ==
	Name on the Register	Image	Date listed	Location	City or town	Description
1	Adams Avenue Historic District	Adams Avenue Historic District	November 25, 1980 (#80004481)	Adams and Washington Aves. 35°08′54″N 90°02′59″W	Memphis	
2	Walter Granville Allen House		February 23, 1990 (#90000320)	8504 Macon Rd. 35°09′22″N 89°46′44″W	Cordova	
3	American Snuff Company Historic District	American Snuff Company Historic District	July 25, 2018 (#100002755)	46 Keel Ave., 700 N Front & 701 N Main Sts. 35°09′50″N 90°02′48″W	Memphis	
4	Anderson-Coward House	Anderson-Coward House	March 13, 1986 (#86000404)	919 Coward Pl. 35°07′50″N 90°01′53″W	Memphis	
5	Annesdale	Annesdale	November 25, 1980 (#80003856)	1325 Lamar Ave. 35°07′30″N 90°01′03″W	Memphis	
6	Annesdale Park Historic District	Annesdale Park Historic District	December 22, 1978 (#78002630)	Roughly bounded by Peabody and Goodbar Aves., Cleveland St. and Rosenstein Pl. 35°07′49″N 90°01′09″W	Memphis	
7	Annesdale-Snowden Historic District	Annesdale-Snowden Historic District	October 25, 1979 (#79002460)	Roughly bounded by Interstate 240, Lamar Ave. and Heistan Pl; 35°07′33″N 90°01′40″W	Memphis	
8	Anshei Sphard-Beth El Emeth Synagogue	Anshei Sphard-Beth El Emeth Synagogue	July 24, 2020 (#100005388)	120 East Yates Road North; 35°08′04″N 89°52′15″W	Memphis	
9	Arlington Historic District	Arlington Historic District	May 17, 1982 (#82004038)	Brown, Campbell, Chester, Quintard, Greenlee, and Walker Sts. 35°17′37″N 89°39′44″W	Arlington	
10	Ashlar Hall	Ashlar Hall	January 13, 1983 (#83003061)	1397 Central Ave. 35°07′34″N 90°00′57″W	Memphis	
11	Audubon Park Historic District	Audubon Park Historic District	November 7, 2022 (#100008389)	750 Cherry Rd. 35°06′46″N 89°55′03″W	Memphis	
12	John Alexander Austin House	John Alexander Austin House	July 12, 1984 (#84003684)	290 S. Front St. 35°08′19″N 90°03′26″W	Memphis	
13	Bank of Commerce and Trust Company Building	Bank of Commerce and Trust Company Building	May 7, 1980 (#80003857)	45 S. 2nd St. 35°08′36″N 90°03′08″W	Memphis	
14	Barksdale Mounted Police Station	Barksdale Mounted Police Station	November 27, 2019 (#100004695)	189 S. Barksdale St. 35°08′02″N 89°59′56″W	Memphis	
15	Barretville Bank and Trust Company Building	Barretville Bank and Trust Company Building	May 7, 2019 (#100003904)	9043 Barret Rd. 35°22′24″N 89°45′50″W	Millington	
16	Pauline Cheek Barton House	Pauline Cheek Barton House	September 7, 1995 (#95001069)	6562 Green Shadows Ln. 35°05′24″N 89°50′42″W	Memphis	
17	Beale Street Historic District	Beale Street Historic District	October 15, 1966 (#66000731)	Beale St. from 2nd to 4th Sts.; also the junction of Beale and 4th Sts. 35°08′23″N 90°03′05″W	Memphis	Second location represents a boundary increase of July 29, 1993
18	Gladys "MaDear" Bennett House	Gladys "MaDear" Bennett House	March 27, 2020 (#100005136)	1039 Delmar Ave. 35°08′53″N 90°01′31″W	Memphis	
19	Boyce-Gregg House	Boyce-Gregg House	December 19, 1979 (#79002462)	317 S. Highland St. 35°07′22″N 89°56′45″W	Memphis	
20	Bradford-Maydwell House	Bradford-Maydwell House	December 26, 1979 (#79002463)	648 Poplar Ave. 35°08′48″N 90°02′17″W	Memphis	
21	John Willard Brister Library	John Willard Brister Library	July 11, 1980 (#80003858)	University of Memphis campus 35°07′05″N 89°56′24″W	Memphis	
22	Wilks Brooks House	Wilks Brooks House	May 16, 1980 (#80003859)	2000 Old Oak Dr. 35°06′12″N 89°50′52″W	Memphis	
23	Calvary Episcopal Church and Parish House	Calvary Episcopal Church and Parish House	April 27, 1982 (#82004039)	102 N. 2nd St. 35°08′50″N 90°03′00″W	Memphis	
24	Joseph A. Campbell House	Joseph A. Campbell House	March 29, 1991 (#91000314)	215 South St. 35°02′21″N 89°39′58″W	Collierville	part of the Collierville Multiple Property Submission (MPS)
25	Capleville Methodist Church		April 3, 1979 (#79002459)	5053 Shelby Dr. 35°01′12″N 89°53′43″W	Capleville	
26	Capt. Harris House	Capt. Harris House	December 19, 1979 (#79002464)	2106 Young St. 35°07′10″N 89°59′30″W	Memphis	
27	Robert M. Carrier House	Robert M. Carrier House	May 27, 1980 (#80003860)	642 S. Willett St. 35°07′43″N 90°00′35″W	Memphis	
28	Central Gardens Historic District	Central Gardens Historic District	September 9, 1982 (#82004040)	Roughly bounded by Rembert St., York, Cleveland, and Eastmoreland Aves. 35°07′47″N 90°00′24″W	Memphis	Boundary increase approved November 17, 2023.
29	Central High School	Central High School	September 17, 1982 (#82004041)	306 S. Bellevue Boulevard; 35°08′01″N 90°01′11″W	Memphis	part of the Public Schools of Memphis 1902-1915 Thematic Resource (TR)
30	Davis Charles House		May 8, 2017 (#100000980)	1291 Winchester Rd. 35°02′20″N 89°42′45″W	Collierville	
31	Cherokee Arms	Cherokee Arms	March 6, 2024 (#100010039)	1508 Madison Avenue; 35°08′18″N 90°00′39″W	Memphis	
32	Chickasaw Heritage Park	Chickasaw Heritage Park	November 25, 1997 (#97001441)	Junction of Riverside Boulevard and Ornamental Metal Museum Dr. 35°07′21″N 90°04′28″W	Memphis	
33	Chucalissa Indian Village	Chucalissa Indian Village	May 7, 1973 (#73001830)	Mitchell Rd. 35°03′45″N 90°07′44″W	Memphis	
34	Cornelius Lawrence Clancy House	Cornelius Lawrence Clancy House	November 25, 1983 (#83004294)	911 Kerr Ave. 35°06′23″N 90°01′57″W	Memphis	
35	Collierville Historic District	Collierville Historic District	March 12, 1990 (#90000305)	Roughly N. and S. Rowlett, Poplar, and Walnut Sts. 35°02′35″N 89°40′02″W	Collierville	part of the Collierville MPS
36	Collins Chapel CME Church and Site	Collins Chapel CME Church and Site	March 29, 1991 (#91000307)	678 Washington Ave. 35°08′44″N 90°02′17″W	Memphis	
37	Columbian Mutual Tower	Columbian Mutual Tower	July 24, 1978 (#78002631)	60 N. Main St. 35°08′48″N 90°03′06″W	Memphis	
38	Cooper-Young Historic District	Cooper-Young Historic District	June 22, 1989 (#89000508)	Roughly bounded by the former L&N railroad tracks, E. Parkway S., Southern Ave., and S. McLean Boulevard; 35°07′13″N 89°59′32″W	Memphis	
39	Cordova School	Cordova School	July 28, 1995 (#95000932)	1017 Sanga Rd. 35°09′11″N 89°46′18″W	Memphis	
40	Cotton Row Historic District	Cotton Row Historic District	August 1, 1979 (#79002467)	S. Front St. between Monroe and Gayoso Aves. 35°08′26″N 90°03′21″W	Memphis	
41	Court Square Historic District	Court Square Historic District	April 15, 1982 (#82004042)	Roughly bounded by Riverside Dr., N. 2nd St., and Madison and Jefferson Aves. 35°08′46″N 90°03′09″W	Memphis	
42	West J. Crawford House	West J. Crawford House	November 4, 2024 (#100010997)	290 S Lauderdale Street; 35°08′09″N 90°02′36″W	Memphis	
43	Crisscross Lodge	Crisscross Lodge	April 6, 1989 (#88002627)	10056 Poplar Ave. 35°03′02″N 89°43′41″W	Collierville	
44	E.H. Crump House	E.H. Crump House	December 26, 1979 (#79002465)	1962 Peabody Ave. 35°07′55″N 89°59′45″W	Memphis	
45	Rowland J. Darnell House	Rowland J. Darnell House	March 26, 1979 (#79002466)	1433 Union Ave. 35°08′10″N 90°00′49″W	Memphis	
46	Davies Manor	Davies Manor	March 19, 1975 (#75001787)	9336 Davies Plantation Rd. 35°13′13″N 89°45′04″W	Memphis	
47	Delmar-Lema Historic District	Delmar-Lema Historic District	March 12, 1998 (#98000242)	1044-1066 Delmar Ave; 1044–1060, 1041-1061 Lemar Pl. 35°08′54″N 90°01′31″W	Memphis	
48	Dermon Building	Dermon Building	March 15, 1984 (#84003688)	46 N. 3rd St. 35°08′44″N 90°02′58″W	Memphis	
49	Dixie Greyhound Bus Lines Complex	Dixie Greyhound Bus Lines Complex	November 21, 2003 (#03001193)	525 N. Main St. 35°09′31″N 90°02′53″W	Memphis	
50	Jack Dudney House	Jack Dudney House	March 29, 1991 (#91000315)	90 W. Poplar Ave. 35°02′45″N 89°39′55″W	Collierville	part of the Collierville MPS
51	East Buntyn Historic District	East Buntyn Historic District	November 22, 1995 (#95001332)	Roughly bounded by Central and Southern Aves. and Ellsworth and Greer Sts. 35°07′11″N 89°57′09″W	Memphis	
52	Elam Homestead	Elam Homestead	September 18, 1980 (#80003861)	1428 Fox St. 35°05′33″N 89°57′05″W	Memphis	
53	William C. Ellis and Sons Ironworks and Machine Shop	William C. Ellis and Sons Ironworks and Machine Shop	August 25, 1983 (#83003062)	231-245 S. Front St. 35°08′24″N 90°03′25″W	Memphis	
54	Elmwood Cemetery	Elmwood Cemetery	March 20, 2002 (#02000233)	824 Dudley St. 35°07′28″N 90°01′46″W	Memphis	
55	Elmwood Cemetery Office and Entrance Bridge	Elmwood Cemetery Office and Entrance Bridge	May 22, 1978 (#78002632)	824 S. Dudley St. 35°07′27″N 90°01′45″W	Memphis	
56	Evergreen Historic District	Evergreen Historic District	January 11, 1985 (#85000080)	Roughly bounded by N. Parkway, Kenilworth St., Watkins St., and Court Ave. 35°08′41″N 90°00′43″W	Memphis	
57	Fairview Junior High School	Fairview Junior High School	October 25, 1990 (#90001571)	750 E. Parkway South; 35°07′30″N 89°58′55″W	Memphis	
58	First Baptist Church	First Baptist Church	March 15, 2005 (#05000182)	538 Linden Ave. 35°08′19″N 90°02′38″W	Memphis	part of the Religious Resources of Memphis, Shelby County, TN MPS
59	First Baptist Church	First Baptist Church	February 11, 1971 (#71000833)	379 Beale Ave. 35°08′19″N 90°02′54″W	Memphis	Also known as Beale Street Baptist Church, historic church built for a congregation of newly freed slaves.
60	First Colored Baptist Church	First Colored Baptist Church	July 14, 2000 (#00000807)	682 S. Lauderdale St. 35°07′43″N 90°02′37″W	Memphis	
61	First Congregational Church and Parish House	First Congregational Church and Parish House	July 21, 1980 (#80003862)	234 S. Watkins St. 35°08′07″N 90°00′54″W	Memphis	
62	First National Bank Operations Center	First National Bank Operations Center	December 18, 2024 (#100011179)	55 N. Danny Thomas Blvd; 35°08′41″N 90°02′38″W	Memphis	
63	First Presbyterian Church	First Presbyterian Church	March 15, 2005 (#05000183)	166 Poplar Ave. 35°09′06″N 90°02′55″W	Memphis	part of the Religious Resources of Memphis, Shelby County, TN MPS
64	John M. Fleming Home Place	John M. Fleming Home Place	December 6, 1990 (#90001763)	1545 S. Byhalia Rd. 35°00′09″N 89°41′51″W	Collierville	
65	Forrest Park Historic District	Forrest Park Historic District	March 4, 2009 (#09000118)	S. Manassas St. and Union Ave. 35°08′22″N 90°02′05″W	Memphis	
66	Fountain Court Historic District	Fountain Court Historic District	December 17, 1998 (#98001531)	1155-1229 Fountain Court; 35°06′59″N 90°02′02″W	Memphis	part of the Memphis MPS
67	Fowlkes-Boyle House	Fowlkes-Boyle House	August 7, 1974 (#74001928)	208 Adams Ave. 35°08′49″N 90°02′50″W	Memphis	
68	Galloway-Speedway Historic District	Galloway-Speedway Historic District	July 28, 2004 (#04000766)	N. Parkway, Faxon, Greenlaw, Galloway, and Forrest Aves. 35°09′25″N 90°01′37″W	Memphis	part of the Memphis MPS
69	Gaston Park Historic District	Gaston Park Historic District	July 3, 1989 (#89000521)	1046 S. 3rd St. 35°07′09″N 90°03′15″W	Memphis	part of the Memphis Park and the Parkway System MPS
70	Gayoso-Peabody Historic District	Gayoso-Peabody Historic District	May 7, 1980 (#80003863)	Roughly along S. Main St. from McCall Pl. to Monroe Ave. 35°08′31″N 90°03′11″W	Memphis	Boundaries modified on January 27, 2006
71	Germantown Baptist Church	Germantown Baptist Church	April 1, 1975 (#75001786)	2216 Germantown Rd. 35°05′04″N 89°48′38″W	Germantown	Not used by Germantown Baptist Church
72	Germantown Redoubt	Germantown Redoubt	June 6, 1991 (#91000623)	Honey Tree Dr. south of its junction with Poplar Pike; 35°04′25″N 89°47′37″W	Germantown	
73	Glenview Historic District	Glenview Historic District	October 7, 1999 (#99001244)	Bounded by the former Southern railroad line, Lamar Ave., S. Parkway East, and the former St. Louis – San Francisco railroad line 35°06′24″N 89°59′58″W	Memphis	part of the Memphis MPS and the Residential Resources of Memphis MPS
74	Goodwinslow		December 6, 1979 (#79002482)	4066 James Rd. 35°12′35″N 89°55′35″W	Raleigh	
75	Goodwyn Street Historic District		March 9, 1990 (#90000302)	Goodwyn St. from Central to Southern Aves. 35°07′11″N 89°57′45″W	Memphis	
76	Nicholas Gotten House	Nicholas Gotten House	March 20, 2002 (#02000236)	2969 Court St. 35°12′23″N 89°52′26″W	Bartlett	
77	Grace Episcopal Church	Grace Episcopal Church	March 15, 2005 (#05000184)	555 Vance Ave. 35°08′10″N 90°02′38″W	Memphis	part of the Religious Resources of Memphis, Shelby County, TN MPS
78	Graceland	Graceland	November 7, 1991 (#91001585)	3764 Elvis Presley Boulevard; 35°02′45″N 90°01′22″W	Memphis	
79	Green Meadows-Poplar Glen Historic District	Green Meadows-Poplar Glen Historic District	April 22, 2003 (#03000304)	Roughly along Union Ave. Extension, Patricia Dr., Madison Ave., Ashlawn Rd., Ashlawn Cove, and Alicia Dr. 35°08′09″N 89°58′44″W	Memphis	
80	Greenlaw Addition Historic District	Greenlaw Addition Historic District	August 16, 1984 (#84003704)	Roughly bounded by Bethel, Thomas, 7th, Auction, and 2nd Sts. 35°09′34″N 90°02′30″W	Memphis	
81	Greenlevel	Greenlevel	March 6, 1987 (#87000397)	853 Collierville-Arlington Rd., S. 35°06′06″N 89°39′33″W	Collierville	
82	Greenstone Apartments	Greenstone Apartments	May 14, 1980 (#80003864)	1116-1118 Poplar Ave. and 200 Waldran Boulevard; 35°08′41″N 90°01′23″W	Memphis	
83	Greenwood	Greenwood	July 9, 1979 (#79002468)	1560 Central Ave. 35°07′36″N 90°00′36″W	Memphis	
84	Griggs Business and Practical Arts College	Griggs Business and Practical Arts College	March 21, 2023 (#100008765)	492 Vance Ave. 35°08′06″N 90°02′45″W	Memphis	
85	Daniel Hanley House		October 28, 2021 (#100007127)	3023 Spottswood Ave. 35°06′48″N 89°57′41″W	Memphis	
86	Hein Park Historic District	Hein Park Historic District	November 16, 1988 (#88002613)	Bounded by Charles Pl., Jackson Ave., Trezevant St., and N. Parkway Dr. 35°09′17″N 89°59′00″W	Memphis	
87	High Point Terrace Historic District	High Point Terrace Historic District	December 12, 2002 (#02001513)	Bounded by Highland, Eastland and Swan Ridge Circle, Walnut Grove and Sam Cooper; 35°08′23″N 89°56′18″W	Memphis	part of the Memphis MPS and the Residential Resources of Memphis MPS
88	Hotel Claridge	Hotel Claridge	April 29, 1982 (#82004045)	109 N. Main St. 35°08′52″N 90°03′06″W	Memphis	
89	J.W. Houston House	J.W. Houston House	March 29, 1991 (#91000313)	259 S. Center St. 35°02′15″N 89°39′58″W	Collierville	part of the Collierville MPS
90	L.C. Humes High School	L.C. Humes High School	July 12, 2004 (#98000368)	659 N. Manassas; 35°09′23″N 90°01′49″W	Memphis	part of the Public Schools of Memphis 1902-1915 MPS
91	Hunt-Phelan House	Hunt-Phelan House	February 11, 1971 (#71000834)	533 Beale Ave. 35°08′15″N 90°02′38″W	Memphis	
92	Idlewild Historic District	Idlewild Historic District	March 5, 1999 (#99000278)	Roughly bounded by S. Cooper St., Linden Ave., Rembert St., and Central Ave. 35°07′47″N 89°59′35″W	Memphis	part of the Memphis MPS and the Residential Resources of Memphis MPS
93	Idlewild Presbyterian Church	Idlewild Presbyterian Church	July 7, 2009 (#09000539)	1750 Union Ave. 35°08′09″N 90°00′12″W	Memphis	part of the Memphis MPS
94	The Knickerbocker Apartments	The Knickerbocker Apartments	November 8, 2007 (#07001165)	23-25 S. McLean Boulevard; 35°08′13″N 89°59′59″W	Memphis	
95	Lauderdale Courts Public Housing Project	Lauderdale Courts Public Housing Project	July 25, 1996 (#96000819)	Danny Thomas Boulevard, Alabama Ave., Exchange Ave., 3rd St., and Winchester; 35°09′03″N 90°02′41″W	Memphis	part of the Memphis MPS and the Public Housing Projects in Memphis MPS
96	Lee and Fontaine Houses of the James Lee Memorial	Lee and Fontaine Houses of the James Lee Memorial	February 11, 1971 (#71000835)	680-690 Adams Ave. 35°08′38″N 90°02′07″W	Memphis	Includes Woodruff-Fontaine House and James Lee House
97	James Lee House	James Lee House	October 2, 1978 (#78002633)	239 Adams Ave. 35°08′49″N 90°02′51″W	Memphis	
98	Lt. George W. Lee House	Lt. George W. Lee House	May 2, 1994 (#94000372)	563 Stephens Pl. 35°07′14″N 90°02′36″W	Memphis	
99	LeMoyne College Historic District	LeMoyne College Historic District	November 9, 2005 (#05001215)	Roughly bounded by Walker, Hollis Price, Crown, and the alley to the rear of Sweeney Hall; 35°07′15″N 90°02′05″W	Memphis	
100	Lenox School	Lenox School	July 30, 1981 (#81000579)	519 S. Edgewood Ave. 35°07′53″N 89°59′12″W	Memphis	
101	George Collins Love House	George Collins Love House	April 2, 1979 (#79002472)	619 N. 7th St. 35°09′33″N 90°02′22″W	Memphis	
102	Lowenstein House	Lowenstein House	March 23, 1979 (#79002473)	756 Jefferson Ave. 35°08′34″N 90°02′07″W	Memphis	
103	Abraham Lowenstein House	Abraham Lowenstein House	January 5, 1984 (#84003705)	217 N. Waldran Boulevard; 35°08′44″N 90°01′26″W	Memphis	
104	B. Lowenstein & Brothers Building	B. Lowenstein & Brothers Building	June 16, 1983 (#83003063)	27 S. Main St. 35°08′39″N 90°03′11″W	Memphis	
105	Madison-Monroe Historic District	Madison-Monroe Historic District	May 19, 1983 (#83003064)	Madison and Monroe Aves., Main and 2nd Sts. 35°08′38″N 90°03′09″W	Memphis	
106	Magevney House	Magevney House	November 6, 1973 (#73001831)	198 Adams Ave. 35°08′50″N 90°02′53″W	Memphis	
107	Martin Memorial Temple CME Church	Martin Memorial Temple CME Church	November 20, 2002 (#02001379)	65 S. Parkway West; 35°06′27″N 90°03′51″W	Memphis	
108	Mason Temple, Church of God in Christ	Mason Temple, Church of God in Christ	April 10, 1992 (#92000286)	958 Mason St. 35°07′18″N 90°02′56″W	Memphis	
109	Maxwelton	Maxwelton	March 10, 1980 (#80003866)	3105 Southern Ave. 35°06′53″N 89°57′27″W	Memphis	
110	John H. McFadden House	John H. McFadden House	June 10, 1994 (#94000577)	3712 Broadway; 35°13′34″N 89°49′05″W	Bartlett	
111	John B. McFerrin House	John B. McFerrin House	March 29, 1991 (#91000316)	156 W. Poplar Ave. 35°02′46″N 89°40′02″W	Collierville	part of the Collierville MPS
112	Medical Arts Building and Garage	Medical Arts Building and Garage	August 16, 1984 (#84003707)	248 Madison Ave. and 11 N. 4th St. 35°08′38″N 90°02′51″W	Memphis	
113	Melrose School	Melrose School	May 2, 2001 (#98000367)	843 Dallas St. 35°06′34″N 89°57′52″W	Memphis	part of the Public Schools of Memphis 1902-1915 MPS
114	Memphis and Arkansas Bridge	Memphis and Arkansas Bridge	February 16, 2001 (#01000139)	U.S. Route 55; 35°07′47″N 90°04′45″W	Memphis	Extends into Crittenden County, Arkansas
115	Memphis Bank and Trust Building	Memphis Bank and Trust Building	July 17, 2013 (#13000502)	44 N. 2nd St. 35°08′45″N 90°03′03″W	Memphis	
116	Memphis Federation Of Musicians Local 71 Building	Memphis Federation Of Musicians Local 71 Building	May 5, 2017 (#16000812)	944 Philadelphia St. 35°07′11″N 89°59′11″W	Memphis	
117	Memphis Landing	Memphis Landing	November 25, 2011 (#11000460)	East side of Wolf River Harbor between Court Ave. and Beale St. 35°08′41″N 90°03′26″W	Memphis	
118	Memphis Merchants Exchange	Memphis Merchants Exchange	May 8, 1979 (#79002474)	2nd St. and Madison Ave. 35°08′42″N 90°03′06″W	Memphis	
119	Memphis National Cemetery	Memphis National Cemetery	October 30, 1996 (#96001233)	3568 Townes Ave. 35°10′23″N 89°56′13″W	Memphis	part of the Civil War Era National Cemeteries MPS
120	Memphis Overland Company	Memphis Overland Company	April 9, 2021 (#100006385)	421 Monroe Ave. 35°08′29″N 90°02′34″W	Memphis	
121	Memphis Parkway System	Memphis Parkway System	July 3, 1989 (#89000520)	S. Parkway West, S. Parkway East, E Parkway South, E. Parkway North, N. Parkway; 35°08′09″N 89°59′00″W	Memphis	part of the Memphis Park and the Parkway System MPS
122	Memphis Pink Palace Museum	Memphis Pink Palace Museum	July 9, 1980 (#80003870)	3050 Central Ave. 35°07′29″N 89°57′37″W	Memphis	
123	Memphis Queen II Floating Vessel	Memphis Queen II Floating Vessel	July 5, 2006 (#06000550)	Foot of Monroe at Riverside Dr. 35°08′46″N 90°03′24″W	Memphis	
124	Memphis Trust Building	Memphis Trust Building	November 25, 1980 (#80003867)	12 S. Main St. 35°08′40″N 90°03′09″W	Memphis	
125	Mid-South Coliseum	Mid-South Coliseum	December 6, 2000 (#00001429)	996 Early Maxwell Boulevard; 35°07′04″N 89°58′51″W	Memphis	
126	Missouri Portland Cement Terminal	Missouri Portland Cement Terminal	April 9, 2021 (#100006384)	48 Henry Ave. 35°09′59″N 90°02′44″W	Memphis	
127	William R. Moore Dry Goods Building	William R. Moore Dry Goods Building	August 26, 1982 (#82004049)	183 Monroe Ave. 35°08′34″N 90°03′01″W	Memphis	Aka the Hein Building, now the Toyota Center
128	Mosby-Bennett House	Mosby-Bennett House	May 27, 1980 (#80003868)	6256 Poplar Avenue; 35°06′05″N 89°51′17″W	Memphis	
129	Mt. Airy	Mt. Airy	February 14, 2002 (#02000011)	10700 Latting Rd. 35°10′50″N 89°42′01″W	Cordova	
130	National Cotton Council Building	National Cotton Council Building	July 30, 2012 (#12000441)	1918 North Parkway; 35°09′10″N 89°59′41″W	Memphis	
131	National Trust Life Insurance Company Building		August 2, 2018 (#100002756)	2701 Union Ave. Extended; 35°08′06″N 89°58′25″W	Memphis	
132	Joseph Newburger House	Joseph Newburger House	April 29, 1982 (#82004050)	168 E. Parkway South; 35°07′58″N 89°58′58″W	Memphis	
133	Normal Station Historic District	Normal Station Historic District	August 10, 2005 (#05000866)	Roughly bounded by Highland, Goodlett, the former Southern railroad line, and the rear property lines of Marion and parcels on Park; 35°05′49″N 89°55′57″W	Memphis	part of the Memphis MPS
134	Oaklawn Garden	Oaklawn Garden	March 28, 2018 (#100002262)	7831 Poplar Pike; 35°04′49″N 89°48′08″W	Germantown	
135	Omicron Sigma Chapter House of Sigma Gamma Rho Sorority, Incorporated	Omicron Sigma Chapter House of Sigma Gamma Rho Sorority, Incorporated	December 4, 2023 (#100009581)	805 Saxon Avenue; 35°07′03″N 90°02′07″W	Memphis	
136	One Hundred North Main Building	One Hundred North Main Building	April 24, 2015 (#15000187)	100 N. Main St. 35°08′53″N 90°03′03″W	Memphis	
137	Orpheum Theatre	Orpheum Theatre	August 15, 1977 (#77001289)	197 S. Main St. 35°08′23″N 90°03′18″W	Memphis	
138	Overton Park Historic District	Overton Park Historic District	October 25, 1979 (#79002475)	Roughly bounded by Poplar Ave., E. Parkway North, N. Parkway East, and Kenilworth St. 35°08′48″N 89°59′21″W	Memphis	
139	Overton Park Court Apartments	Overton Park Court Apartments	June 28, 2021 (#100006712)	2095 Poplar Ave. 35°08′30″N 89°59′26″W	Memphis	
140	Overton Parkway Historic District	Overton Parkway Historic District	November 18, 1999 (#99001370)	Roughly bounded by Cooper St., E. Parkway, Poplar and Madison Sts. 35°08′19″N 89°59′13″W	Memphis	part of the Memphis MPS and the Residential Resources of Memphis MPS
141	Paisley Hall	Paisley Hall	February 12, 1980 (#80003869)	1822 Overton Park Ave. 35°08′55″N 89°59′54″W	Memphis	
142	Parkview Hotel Apartments	Parkview Hotel Apartments	July 7, 2022 (#100007910)	1914 Poplar Ave. 35°08′33″N 89°59′49″W	Memphis	
143	Patton-Bejach House	Patton-Bejach House	July 27, 1979 (#79002476)	1085 Poplar St. 35°08′38″N 90°01′25″W	Memphis	
144	Peabody Elementary School	Peabody Elementary School	September 17, 1982 (#82004051)	2086 Young Ave. 35°07′11″N 89°59′33″W	Memphis	part of the Public Schools of Memphis 1902-1915 TR
145	Peabody Hotel	Peabody Hotel	September 14, 1977 (#77001290)	149 Union Ave. 35°08′33″N 90°03′11″W	Memphis	
146	Ell Persons Lynching Site	Ell Persons Lynching Site	August 7, 2024 (#100009136)	Near 5400 Summer Ave. 35°09′36″N 89°52′52″W	Memphis	
147	Picardy Place Historic District		July 25, 2014 (#14000450)	157-205 S. Fenwick Rd., 160-201 Picardy Place; 35°07′38″N 89°58′04″W	Memphis	
148	Pinch-North Main Commercial District	Pinch-North Main Commercial District	October 18, 1979 (#79002477)	Roughly bounded by N. Front and N. 2nd Sts., Commerce and Auction Aves.; also 122 Jackson Ave. 35°09′20″N 90°02′56″W	Memphis	122 Jackson represents a boundary increase of October 25, 1990
149	Dr. D.T. Porter Building	Dr. D.T. Porter Building	April 18, 1977 (#77001291)	10 N. Main St. 35°08′43″N 90°03′08″W	Memphis	
150	Porter-Leath House	Porter-Leath House	May 8, 1979 (#79002471)	850 N. Manassas St. 35°09′54″N 90°01′53″W	Memphis	
151	Elvis Presley House	Elvis Presley House	March 9, 2006 (#05001217)	1034 Audubon Dr. 35°06′19″N 89°55′12″W	Memphis	part of the Memphis MPS
152	Eli Rayner House	Eli Rayner House	May 9, 1977 (#77001292)	1020 Rayner St. 35°07′06″N 90°00′40″W	Memphis	
153	Rock of Ages Christian Methodist Episcopal Church		April 10, 2017 (#100000859)	478 Scott St. 35°08′43″N 89°58′02″W	Memphis	
154	Rosemark Historic District		June 14, 2013 (#13000400)	8501-8760 Kerrville-Rosemark Rd.; 8519-8727, 8736 Rosemark Rd. 35°21′44″N 89°46′20″W	Rosemark	
155	Dr. Christopher M. Roulhac House	Dr. Christopher M. Roulhac House	April 15, 2004 (#04000301)	810 McLemore Ave. 35°07′04″N 90°02′07″W	Memphis	part of the Memphis MPS
156	Rozelle Elementary School	Rozelle Elementary School	September 17, 1982 (#82004052)	993 Roland St. 35°07′08″N 90°00′34″W	Memphis	part of the Public Schools of Memphis 1902-1915 TR
157	St. Mary's Cathedral, Chapel, and Diocesan House	St. Mary's Cathedral, Chapel, and Diocesan House	January 19, 1979 (#79002480)	700, 714, and 692 Poplar Avenue; 35°08′47″N 90°02′11″W	Memphis	
158	St. Mary's Catholic Church	St. Mary's Catholic Church	August 7, 1974 (#74001929)	155 Market St. 35°09′04″N 90°02′52″W	Memphis	
159	St. Paul Avenue Historic District	St. Paul Avenue Historic District	December 17, 1998 (#98001533)	751-53 to 775-77 St. Paul Ave., and 558 Boyd St. 35°07′59″N 90°02′11″W	Memphis	part of the Memphis MPS
160	St. Thomas Catholic Church and Convent	St. Thomas Catholic Church and Convent	March 15, 2005 (#05000185)	588 E. Trigg Ave. 35°06′52″N 90°02′36″W	Memphis	part of the Religious Resources of Memphis, Shelby County, TN MPS
161	Scimitar Building	Scimitar Building	June 30, 1983 (#83003065)	179 Madison Ave. 35°08′38″N 90°03′00″W	Memphis	aka Winchester Building, aka Madison Avenue Building, aka Memphis Gas, Light, and Water Building, now Hotel Napoleon.
162	Sculptures of Dionicio Rodriguez at Memorial Park Cemetery	Sculptures of Dionicio Rodriguez at Memorial Park Cemetery	January 31, 1991 (#90001867)	5668 Poplar Ave. 35°06′30″N 89°52′25″W	Memphis	
163	Sears, Roebuck and Company Catalog Distribution Center and Retail Store	Sears, Roebuck and Company Catalog Distribution Center and Retail Store	December 18, 2013 (#13000954)	495 N. Watkins St. 35°09′07″N 90°00′54″W	Memphis	
164	Second Congregational Church	Second Congregational Church	August 26, 1982 (#82004053)	764 Walker Ave. 35°07′10″N 90°02′11″W	Memphis	
165	Second Presbyterian Church	Second Presbyterian Church	September 4, 1979 (#79002478)	280 Hernando St. 35°08′07″N 90°03′04″W	Memphis	Listed again in 2017 as Clayborn Temple (reference number 100001370)
166	Shadowlawn Historic District	Shadowlawn Historic District	August 14, 1995 (#95000941)	Roughly bounded by Shadowlawn, Wellington, S. Parkway and Essex Sts. 35°06′15″N 90°02′50″W	Memphis	
167	Shrine Building	Shrine Building	March 29, 1979 (#79002479)	66 Monroe Ave. 35°08′40″N 90°03′16″W	Memphis	
168	South Bluffs Warehouse Historic District	South Bluffs Warehouse Historic District	June 4, 1987 (#87000453)	Roughly S. Front St., Wagner Pl., and Tennessee St. from Beale St. to Calhoun Ave. 35°08′09″N 90°03′36″W	Memphis	
169	South Main Street Historic District	South Main Street Historic District	September 2, 1982 (#82004054)	Roughly S. Main St. between Webster and Linden, and Mulberry between Calhoun and Vance Aves.; also 663 S. Main St.; also 384 Mulberry and 129 Talbot; also 124-125, 136-137, 148, 153, 154, 158, and 161 G.E. Patterson Ave., and 138 St. Paul Ave. 35°08′01″N 90°03′28″W	Memphis	Second, third, and fourth sets of addresses represent boundary increases of March 8, 1997, July 9, 1999, and August 13, 2013
170	South Parkway-Heiskell Farm Historic District	South Parkway-Heiskell Farm Historic District	February 11, 1983 (#83003066)	S. Parkway East and E. Parkway South; 35°06′47″N 89°59′27″W	Memphis	
171	Southern Railway Industrial Historic District	Southern Railway Industrial Historic District	April 24, 2007 (#07000361)	Roughly bounded by Beale, Myrtle, and the former Southern railroad tracks, Linden, Jessamine and Orleans; 35°08′14″N 90°02′24″W	Memphis	
172	Southwestern at Memphis Historic District	Southwestern at Memphis Historic District	July 20, 1978 (#78002635)	2000 N. Parkway; 35°09′13″N 89°59′24″W	Memphis	
173	Southwestern at Memphis Sorority Row Historic District	Southwestern at Memphis Sorority Row Historic District	July 12, 2006 (#06000583)	2000 North Parkway at Rhodes College; 35°09′24″N 89°59′15″W	Memphis	
174	Speedway Terrace Historic District	Speedway Terrace Historic District	March 19, 1999 (#99000280)	Roughly bounded by N. Watkins, Snowden, N. Bellevue, and Forrest Ave. 35°09′23″N 90°01′04″W	Memphis	part of the Memphis MPS and the Residential Resources of Memphis MPS
175	Squire's Rest	Squire's Rest	May 31, 2007 (#07000533)	8993 Barret Rd. 35°22′19″N 89°45′54″W	Barretville	
176	Steele Hall	Steele Hall	March 23, 1979 (#79002481)	LeMoyne-Owen College campus 35°07′09″N 90°02′09″W	Memphis	
177	Sterick Building	Sterick Building	October 2, 1978 (#78002636)	8 N. 3rd St. 35°08′40″N 90°02′59″W	Memphis	
178	Sterick North Garage and Hotel	Sterick North Garage and Hotel	March 26, 2018 (#100002263)	22 N B.B. King Blvd. 35°08′43″N 90°03′00″W	Memphis	
179	Stonewall Place Historic District	Stonewall Place Historic District	March 25, 1982 (#82004055)	Stonewall St. between Poplar Ave. and North Parkway; 35°08′52″N 90°00′36″W	Memphis	
180	Strathmore Place Historic District	Strathmore Place Historic District	December 17, 1998 (#98001532)	Strathmore Circle East, North, and South, and 280 and 292 East Parkway; 35°08′04″N 89°58′51″W	Memphis	part of the Memphis MPS
181	Leslie M. Stratton YMCA	Leslie M. Stratton YMCA	June 30, 1983 (#83003067)	245 Madison Ave. 35°08′36″N 90°02′52″W	Memphis	
182	Sun Record Company, Memphis Recording Service	Sun Record Company, Memphis Recording Service	July 31, 2003 (#03001031)	706 Union Ave. 35°08′21″N 90°02′15″W	Memphis	
183	Tennessee Brewery	Tennessee Brewery	November 25, 1980 (#80004482)	477 Tennessee St. 35°08′05″N 90°03′39″W	Memphis	
184	Tennessee Club-Overall Goodbar Building	Tennessee Club-Overall Goodbar Building	April 22, 1982 (#82004056)	128-130 Court Ave. 35°08′47″N 90°03′04″W	Memphis	
185	Tennessee Trust Building	Tennessee Trust Building	December 9, 1982 (#82001732)	81 Madison Ave. 35°08′42″N 90°03′12″W	Memphis	
186	Third Addition to Jackson Terrace Historic District		November 21, 2001 (#01001260)	Henry Ave., Hardin Ave., Atlantic Ave., and Crump Ave. 35°09′46″N 89°57′12″W	Memphis	part of the Memphis MPS and the Residential Resources of Memphis MPS
187	John W. Thomas House	John W. Thomas House	March 29, 1991 (#91000312)	245 W. Poplar Ave. 35°02′43″N 89°40′13″W	Collierville	part of the Collierville MPS
188	Toof Building	Toof Building	August 26, 1982 (#82004057)	195 Madison Ave. 35°08′37″N 90°02′58″W	Memphis	
189	John S. Toof House	John S. Toof House	March 25, 1982 (#82004058)	246 Adams Ave. 35°08′49″N 90°02′48″W	Memphis	
190	Tri State Iron Works	Tri State Iron Works	April 17, 1997 (#97000339)	61 Keel Ave. 35°09′48″N 90°02′47″W	Memphis	
191	Tri-State Bank	Tri-State Bank	February 11, 1971 (#71000836)	386 Beale St. 35°08′22″N 90°02′53″W	Memphis	
192	U.S. Marine Hospital	U.S. Marine Hospital	May 13, 2019 (#100003905)	360 Metal Museum Dr. 35°07′23″N 90°04′27″W	Memphis	
193	U.S. Marine Hospital Executive Building and Laundry-Kitchen	U.S. Marine Hospital Executive Building and Laundry-Kitchen	July 2, 1980 (#80003872)	360 and 374 W. California Ave. 35°07′25″N 90°04′27″W	Memphis	
194	U.S. Post Office-Front Street Station	U.S. Post Office-Front Street Station	June 30, 1980 (#80003873)	1 N. Front St. 35°08′43″N 90°03′16″W	Memphis	Now home to the Cecil C. Humphreys School of Law.
195	Universal Life Insurance Company	Universal Life Insurance Company	July 24, 2007 (#07000762)	480 Linden Ave. 35°08′13″N 90°02′44″W	Memphis	
196	Victorian Village District	Victorian Village District	December 11, 1972 (#72001253)	Adams and Jefferson Sts. 35°08′42″N 90°02′20″W	Memphis	
197	Vollintine Evergreen Avalon Historic District	Vollintine Evergreen Avalon Historic District	May 23, 1997 (#97000476)	Roughly bounded by Stonewall, Vollintine, and Evergreen Sts., and Cypress Creek; 35°09′57″N 90°00′14″W	Memphis	
198	Vollintine Evergreen Historic District	Vollintine Evergreen Historic District	April 12, 1996 (#96000410)	Roughly bounded by Watkins St., Vollintine Ave., Faxon Ave., Jackson Ave., and University St. 35°09′26″N 90°00′35″W	Memphis	
199	Vollintine Evergreen North Historic District	Vollintine Evergreen North Historic District	May 23, 1997 (#97000475)	Roughly bounded by Mclean Boulevard, Vollintine Ave., University St., and Rainbow Cir. 35°09′52″N 89°59′35″W	Memphis	
200	Vollintine Hills Historic District	Vollintine Hills Historic District	July 11, 2007 (#07000684)	Roughly bounded by Vollintine, Brown, McLean, and Evergreen; 35°09′53″N 89°59′56″W	Memphis	part of the Memphis MPS
201	J.R. Watkins Products Building		June 29, 2026 (#100013171)	62-70 W. Crump Boulevard; 35°07′29″N 90°03′51″W	Memphis	
202	Wells School		March 31, 1995 (#95000292)	4140 Collierville-Arlington Rd. 35°14′20″N 89°38′58″W	Eads	
203	Wildwood Farms	Wildwood Farms	July 24, 2017 (#100001371)	2737 S. Germantown Rd. 35°04′22″N 89°48′54″W	Germantown	
204	Ernest C. Withers House		July 7, 2022 (#100007909)	480 West Brooks Rd. 35°03′49″N 90°04′48″W	Memphis	
205	Wooten Fallout Shelter		November 27, 2019 (#100004683)	Lions Gate Dr. 35°00′50″N 90°01′30″W	Memphis	
206	Zion Cemetery	Zion Cemetery	February 23, 1990 (#90000301)	S. Parkway East at Pillow St. 35°06′39″N 90°00′51″W	Memphis	

== Former listings ==
Twenty-three other properties were once listed, but have now been removed:

	Name on the Register	Image	Date listed	Date removed	Location	City or town	Description
1	Robert S. Bowles House		December 26, 1979 (#79002461)	July 22, 1980	544-548 Vance Avenue	Memphis	Removed due to procedural error during nomination. Included in the Vance-Pontotoc Historic District.
2	Douglass High School		March 12, 1998 (#98000241)	November 9, 2007	3200 Mount Olive Rd. 35°10′32″N 89°57′06″W	Memphis	Demolished in 2006.
3	First Methodist Church	First Methodist Church	March 19, 1976 (#76001804)	November 9, 2007	204 North 2nd Street	Memphis	Destroyed by a multi-block fire in downtown Memphis on October 6, 2006.
4	Gartly-Ramsay Hospital		July 12, 1984 (#84003700)	November 9, 2007	696 Jackson Avenue	Memphis	
5	Guthrie Elementary School		September 17, 1982 (#82004043)	November 9, 2007	951 Chelsea Avenue	Memphis	
6	Patrick Hayley House		October 10, 1979 (#79002469)	July 21, 1980	604 Vance Ave.	Memphis	Removed due to procedural error during nomination. Included in the Vance-Pontotoc Historic District.
7	A. B. Hill Elementary School		September 17, 1982 (#82004044)	November 9, 2007	1372 Latham Street	Memphis	
8	Lauderdale Walker Elementary School		September 17, 1982 (#82004046)	November 9, 2007	995 South Lauderdale Street	Memphis	
9	LeMoyne Gardens Public Housing Project		July 25, 1996 (#96000820)	June 10, 2022	Walker, Porter, Provine, and Neptune Sts. 35°07′18″N 90°02′04″W	Memphis	part of the Memphis MPS and the Public Housing Projects in Memphis MPS
10	Libertyland Grand Carousel	Libertyland Grand Carousel	July 3, 1980 (#80003865)	November 18, 2009	Libertyland Theme Park; 35°07′31″N 89°58′38″W	Memphis	Carousel put in storage when the Park closed in 2009. Reinstalled next to the Children's Museum of Memphis in 2017.
11	Linden Station and Reichman-Crosby Warehouse		September 8, 1978 (#78002634)	November 9, 2007	245, 281, 291 Wagner Place	Memphis	
12	Maury Elementary School		September 17, 1982 (#82004047)	November 9, 2007	272 North Bellevue Boulevard	Memphis	
13	Memphis Street Railway Company Office and Streetcar Complex		September 17, 1982 (#82004048)	November 9, 2007	821 Beale St	Memphis	
14	Nelson-Kirby House		October 23, 1986 (#86002913)	May 5, 2023	6792 Poplar Pike; 35°05′48″N 89°50′10″W	Germantown	Demolished in 2013?
15	Pippin Roller Coaster	Pippin Roller Coaster	November 8, 2007 (#07001166)	March 21, 2011	Mid-South Fairgrounds bounded by E. Parkway, Central and Southern Aves. and Early Maxwell Boulevard; 35°07′08″N 89°58′53″W	Memphis	Wooden roller coaster moved to Bay Beach Amusement Park at Green Bay, Wisconsin by May 2011.
16	Leroy Pope Elementary School		September 17, 1982 (#82005387)	November 9, 2007	190 Chelsea Avenue	Memphis	
17	Randolph House		February 11, 1971 (#71001073)	December 13, 1976	546 Beale St.	Memphis	Destroyed by arsonist on April 10, 1976.
18	Newton Copeland Richards House	Newton Copeland Richards House	July 12, 1984 (#84003709)	April 12, 2022	975 Peabody Ave. 35°07′57″N 90°01′44″W	Memphis	Destroyed by fire in March 2017
19	Clarence Saunders Estate		November 13, 1989 (#89001969)	February 22, 2002	5922 Quince	Memphis	Built by Clarence Saunders in 1928. Housed the main complex for the Lichterman Nature Center. Destroyed by fire on February 25, 1994.
20	Stephens-Cochran House		July 9, 1980 (#80003871)	January 17, 1985	784 Poplar Ave.	Memphis	Demolished in September, 1984.
21	Union Avenue Methodist Episcopal Church, South	Union Avenue Methodist Episcopal Church, South	March 6, 1987 (#87000399)	March 27, 2013	2117 Union Ave.	Memphis	Demolished in March, 2011.
22	Vance-Pontotoc Historic District	Vance-Pontotoc Historic District	March 19, 1980 (#80003874)	March 18, 1987	An irregular pattern along Vance and Pontotoc Aves.	Memphis	Twelve of the buildings were destroyed by fire between 1979 and 1982. Only 12 of the 65 listed buildings remain.
23	Veterans Administration Hospital Complex, No. 88--Memphis		November 29, 1995 (#95001371)	November 9, 2007	1025 E. H. Crump Blvd. E.	Memphis	
24	Wells-Arrington Historic District		April 22, 1999 (#99000463)	July 22, 2014	563-610 Arrington Ave. and 556-601 Wells Ave. 35°10′23″N 90°02′18″W	Memphis	part of the Memphis MPS and the Residential Resources of Memphis MPS

== See also ==
- List of National Historic Landmarks in Tennessee
- National Register of Historic Places listings in Tennessee
