= Second Congregational Church =

Second Congregational Church may refer to:

- Second Congregational Church (Newcastle, Maine), listed on the U.S. National Register of Historic Places (NRHP)
- Second Congregational Church of Attleboro (Massachusetts), Attleboro, Massachusetts, U.S.
- Second Congregational Church of Newport or Clarke Street Meeting House, Rhode Island, U.S., NRHP-listed
- Second Congregational Church (Memphis, Tennessee), U.S., NRHP-listed
