= Lowenstein House =

Historic house in Tennessee, United States

- U.S. National Register of Historic Places
- Location within Tennessee Location within the United States
- Location: 756 Jefferson Avenue, Memphis, Tennessee
- Coordinates: 35°8′34″N 90°2′7″W
- Area: 0.3 acres (0.12 ha)
- Built: 1890
- Architectural style: Queen Anne, Italianate
- NRHP reference No.: 79002473
- Added to NRHP: March 23, 1979

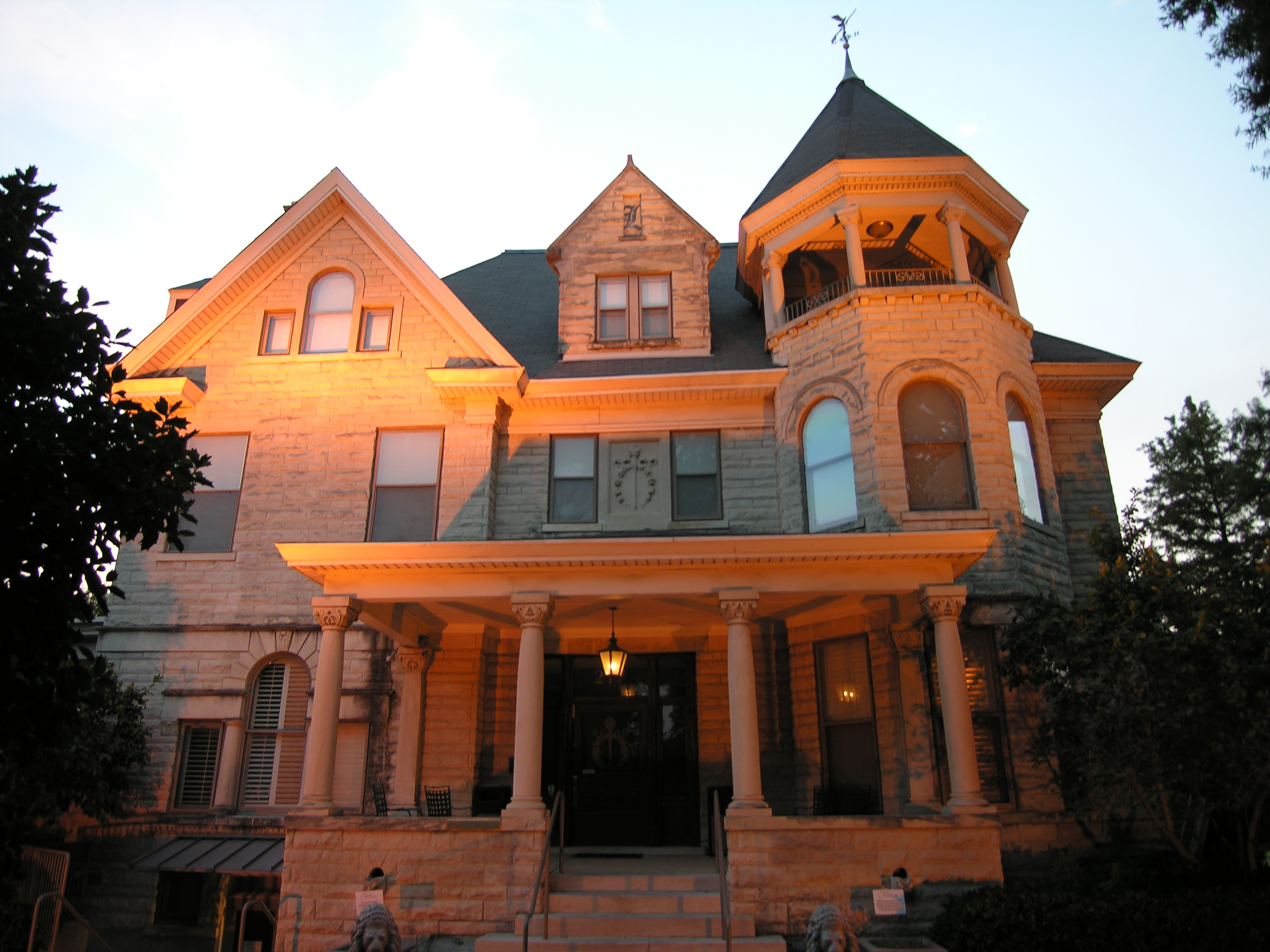
Lowenstein House.JPG

The Lowenstein House is a historic house in Memphis, Tennessee, U.S. It was built circa 1890 for Elias Lowenstein, a German-born merchant. During World War I, it was used as a boarding house for women who worked. In the first half of the 1920s, Lowenstein's daughter, Celia Lowenstein Samelson, donated the house to The Nineteenth Century Club. It has been listed on the National Register of Historic Places since March 23, 1979.
