= Mosby-Bennett House =

Historic house in Tennessee, United States

- U.S. National Register of Historic Places
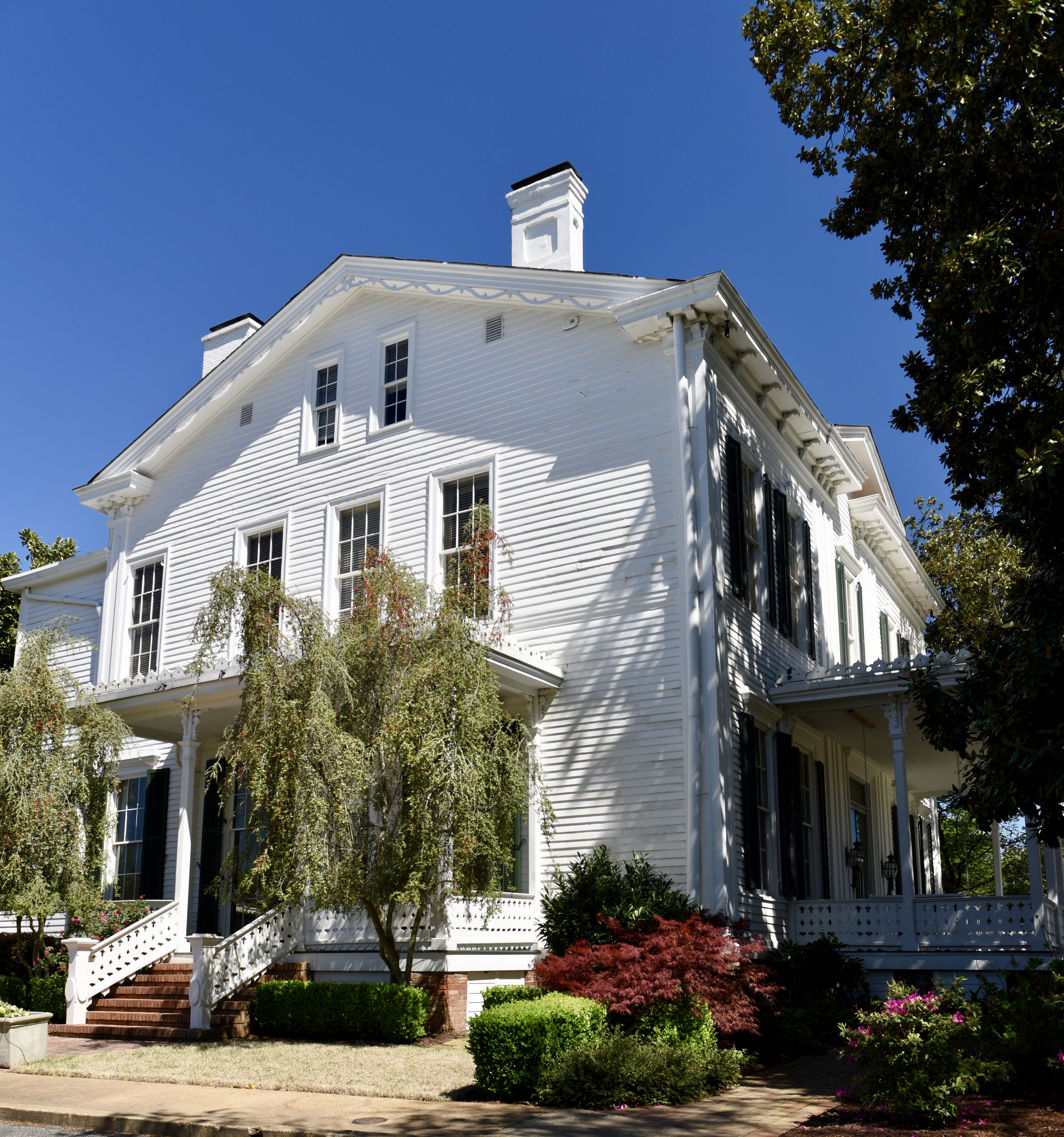
- The Mosby-Bennett House in 2017

- Location within Tennessee
- Location: 6256 Poplar Ave, Memphis, Tennessee
- Coordinates: 35°06′05″N 89°51′17″W
- Area: less than one acre
- Built: 1852
- Architectural style: Greek Revival
- NRHP reference No.: 80003868
- Added to NRHP: May 27, 1980

The Mosby-Bennett House is a historic house in Memphis, Tennessee. It was built in the Antebellum era. It is listed on the National Register of Historic Places.

== History ==
The house was built in 1852 for Joseph and Samuel Mosby. The Mosbys owned 5,000 acres in Shelby County, and they were absentee owners. The house was rented by William Lawrence Hall in the Antebellum years.

During the American Civil War of 1861–1865, Union Army General Ulysses S. Grant is rumored to have stayed in the house prior to the Battle of Shiloh.

The house was purchased by George Bennett, a horse breeder, in 1870. It was later owned by the Smith family, followed by several others. The house is currently owned by R. Sadler Bailey, Esq. and is the home of Bailey & Greer, PLLC.

== Architectural significance ==
The house was designed in the Greek Revival and Victorian architectural styles. It has been listed on the National Register of Historic Places since May 27, 1980.
