= Walter Granville Allen House =

- U.S. National Register of Historic Places
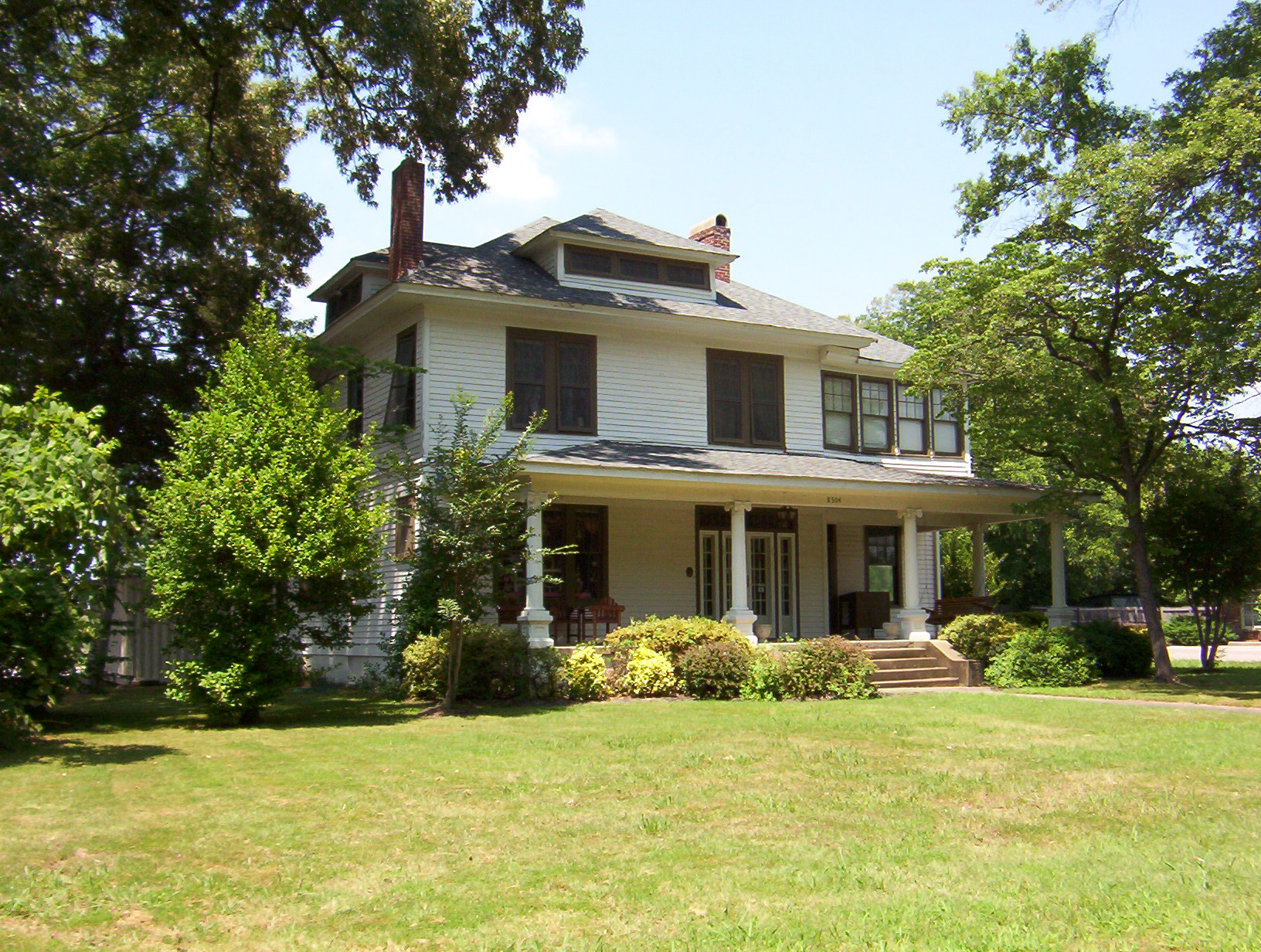
- Location: Cordova, Tennessee
- Coordinates: 35.1561°N 89.7789°W
- Architectural style: Colonial revival
- NRHP reference No.: 90000320
- Added to NRHP: February 23, 1990

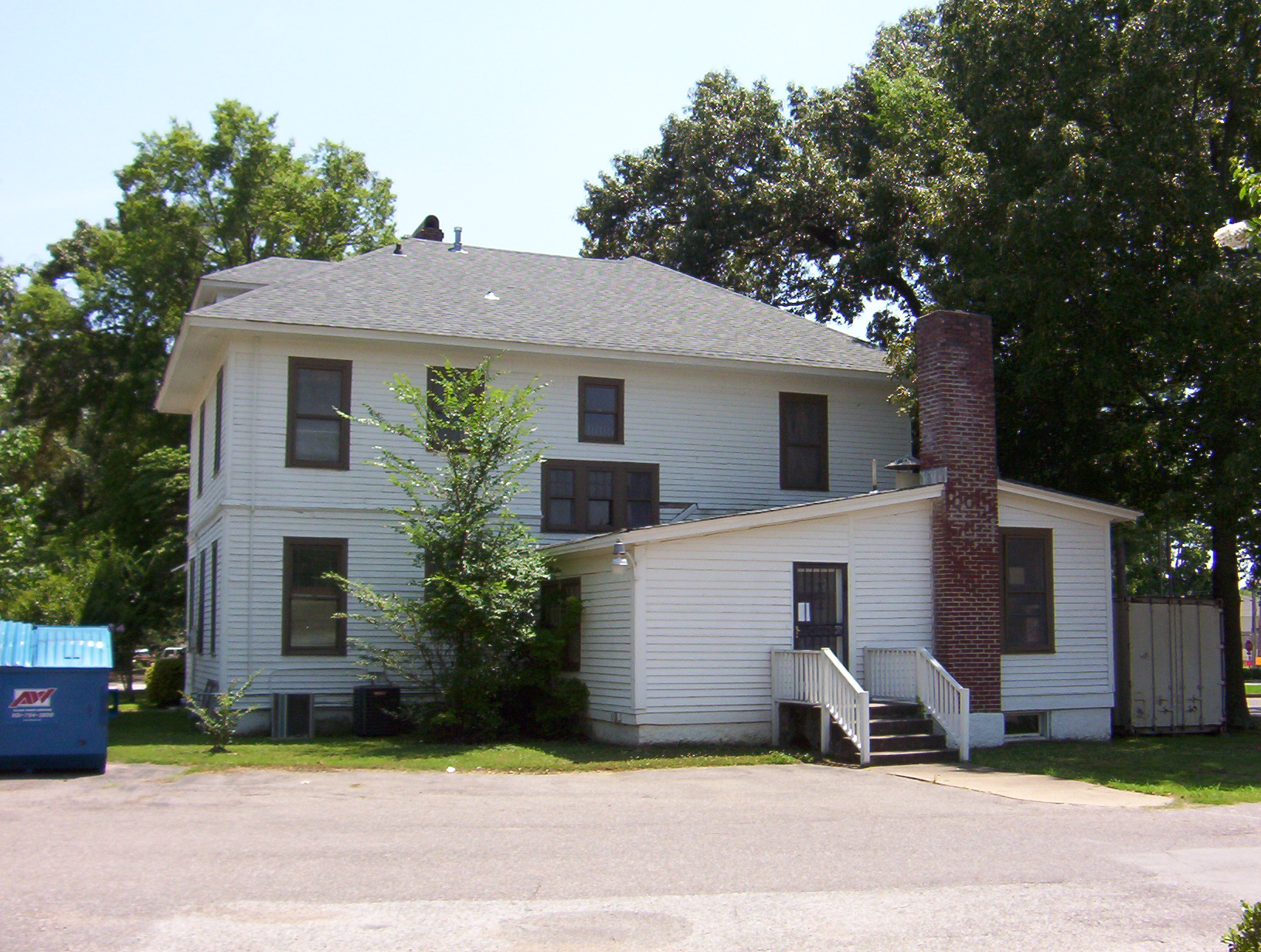

Walter Granville Allen House is an early 20th-century Colonial Revival architecture residence in Cordova, Tennessee (the area was formerly known as Allentown). It is listed on the National Register of Historic Places. It is at 8504 Macon Road. It was built in 1913 and 1914 yo replace a home on the site that burned. Walter Granville Allen (1851–1917) was a businessman, banker, and planter. Augusta Allen was his wife.

The two-story wood frame home was built in an unincorproated agricultural area.

== See also ==
- National Register of Historic Places listings in Shelby County, Tennessee
