= Fowlkes-Boyle House =

Historic house in Tennessee, United States

- U.S. National Register of Historic Places
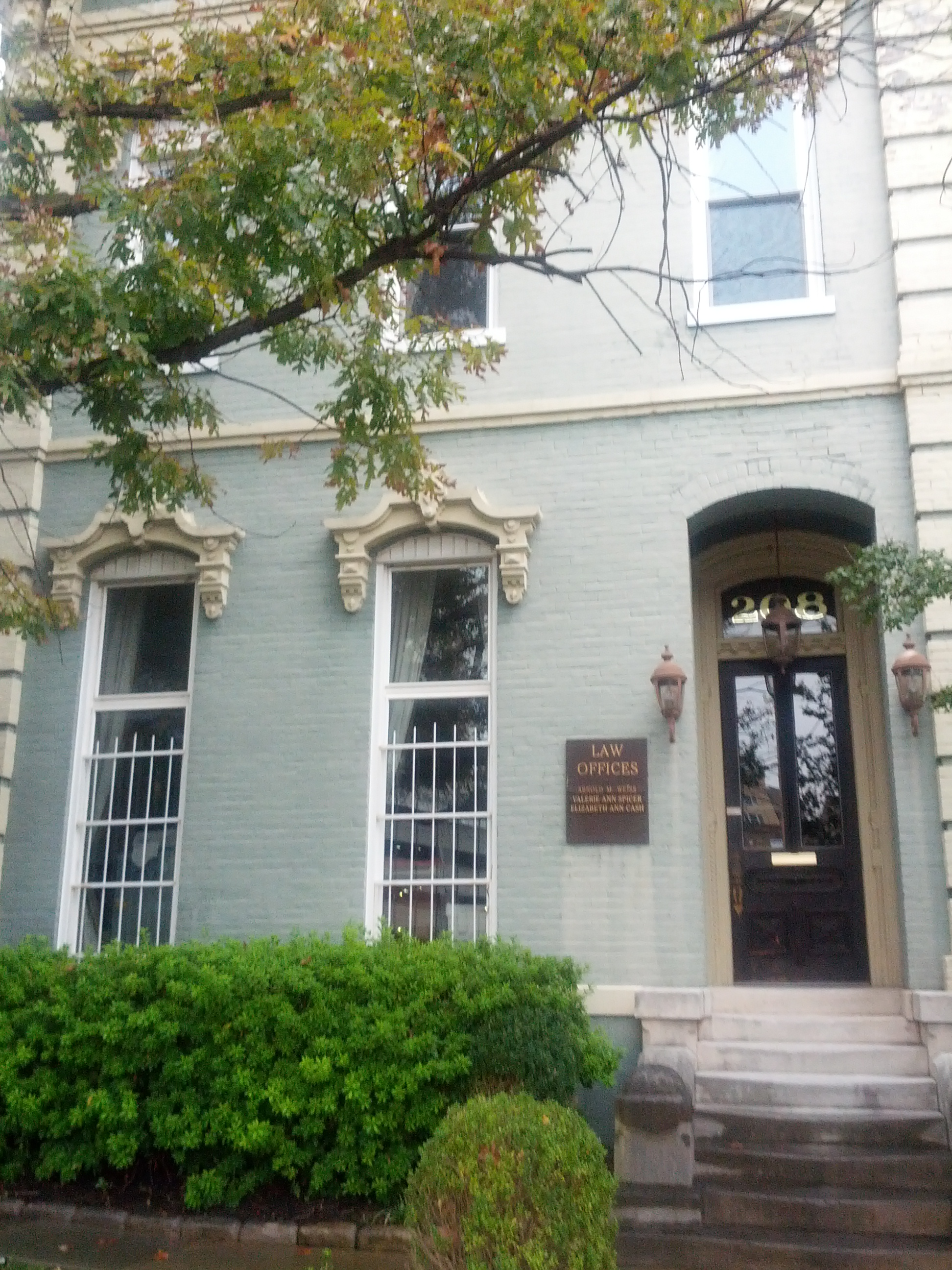
- The Fowlkes-Boyle House in 2012

- Location within Tennessee Location within the United States
- Location: 208 Adams Avenue, Memphis, Tennessee
- Coordinates: 35°8′49″N 90°2′50″W
- Area: 0.3 acres (0.12 ha)
- Built: 1850
- Architectural style: Late Victorian
- NRHP reference No.: 74001928
- Added to NRHP: August 7, 1974

The Fowlkes-Boyle House is a historic house in Memphis, Tennessee, U.S.. It was built circa 1850 for Sterling Fowlkes. It belonged to the Boyle family from 1873 to 1920. It has been listed on the National Register of Historic Places since August 7, 1974.
