= Bradford-Maydwell House =

Historic house in Tennessee, United States

- U.S. National Register of Historic Places
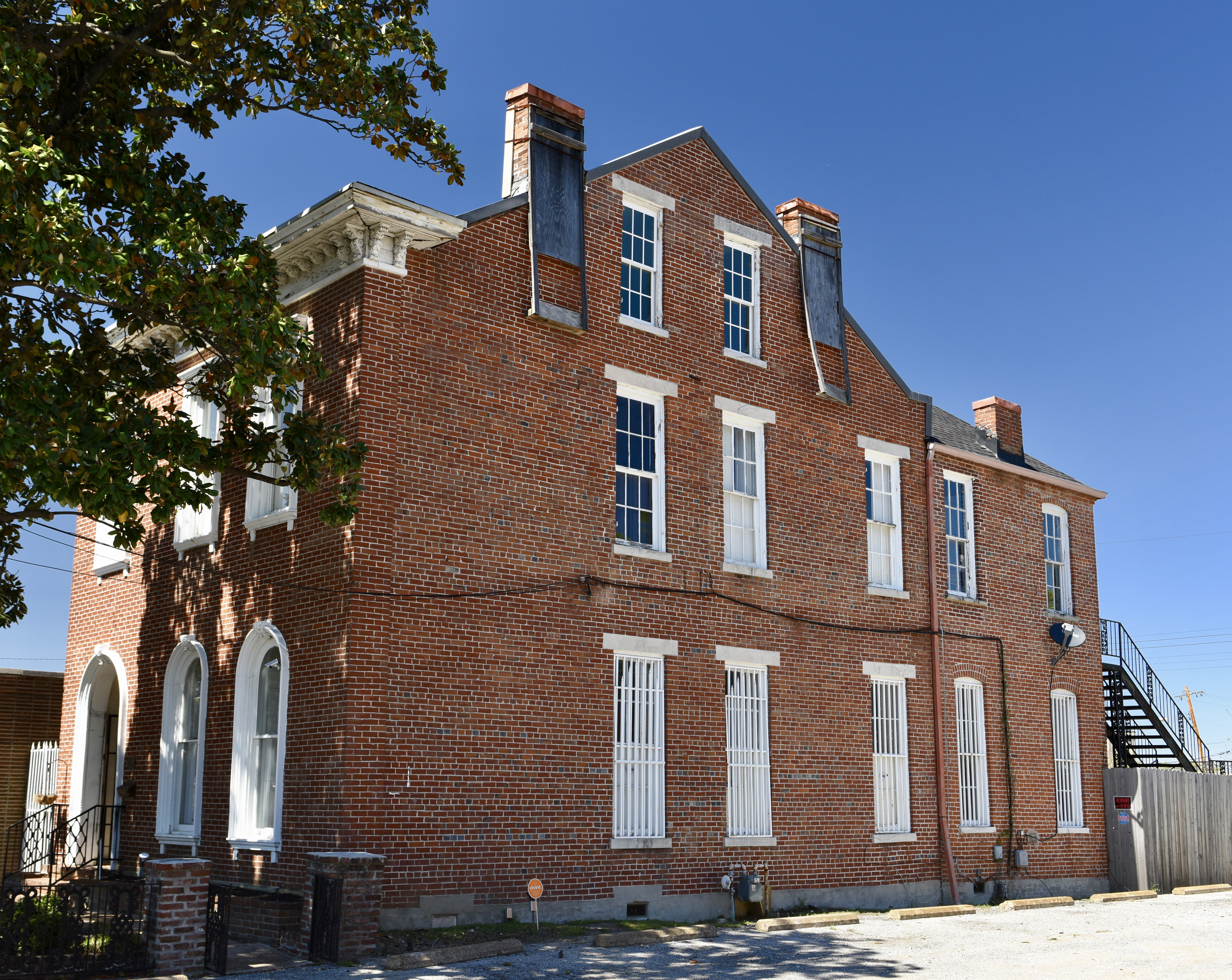
- The Bradford-Maydwell House in 2017

- Location within Tennessee Location within the United States
- Interactive map showing the location of Bradford-Maydwell House
- Location: 648 Poplar Avenue, Memphis, Tennessee
- Coordinates: 35°8′48″N 90°2′17″W
- Area: 0.2 acres (0.081 ha)
- Built: 1859
- Architectural style: Italianate, Federal
- NRHP reference No.: 79002463
- Added to NRHP: December 26, 1979

The Bradford-Maydwell House is a historic house in Memphis, Tennessee. The plot of land was acquired by W. C. Bradford in 1853; by 1860, it belonged to James Maydwell. The construction of the house began in 1859. It was designed both in the Federal and Italianate architectural style. It has been listed on the National Register of Historic Places since December 26, 1979.
