= Cornelius Lawrence Clancy House =

Historic house in Tennessee, United States

- U.S. National Register of Historic Places
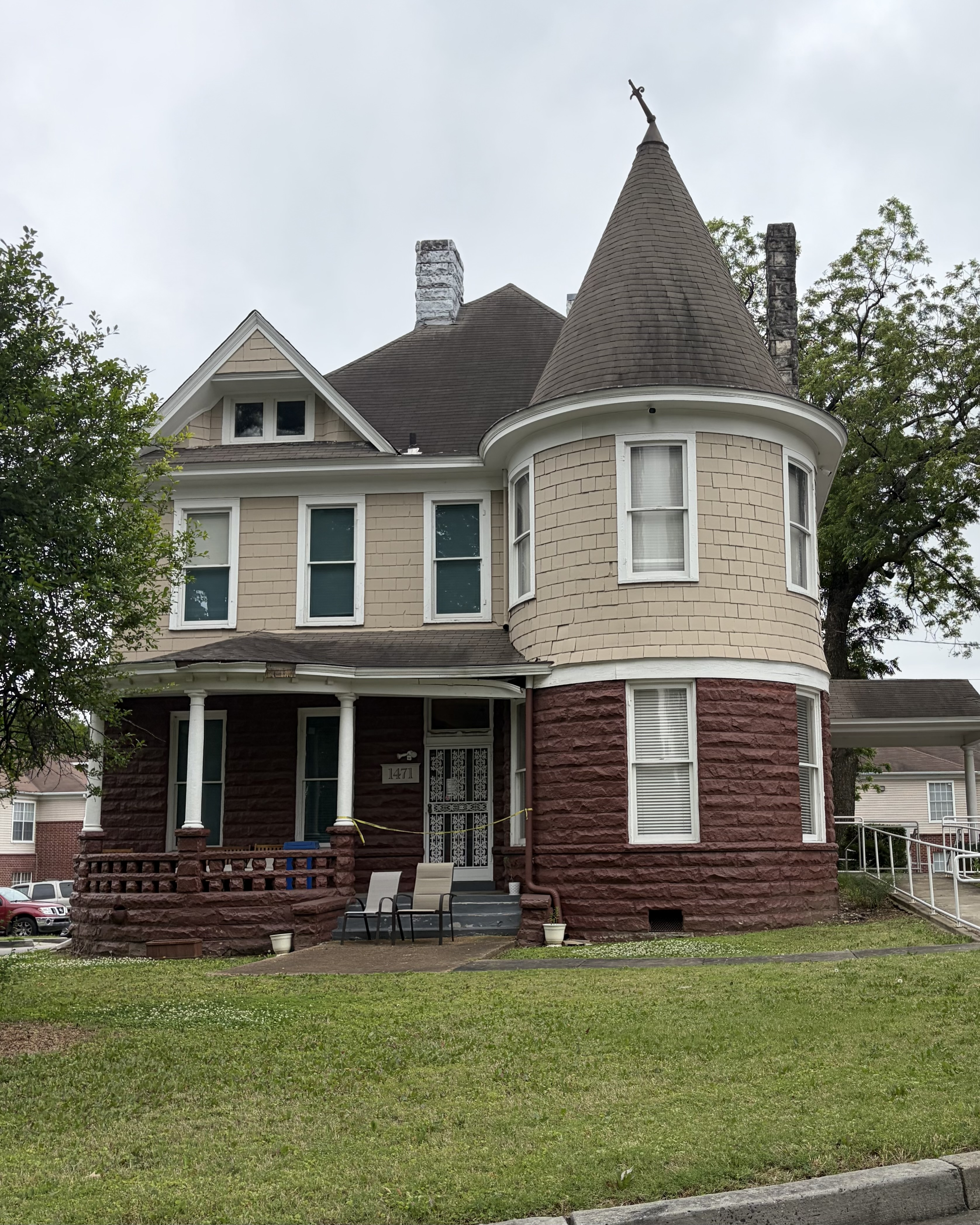
- The Clancy House in 2026

- Location within Tennessee
- Location: 911 Kerr Avenue, Memphis, Tennessee
- Coordinates: 35°06′23″N 90°01′57″W
- Area: 3 acres (1.2 ha)
- Built: 1900
- Architectural style: Queen Anne
- NRHP reference No.: 83004294
- Added to NRHP: November 25, 1983

The Cornelius Lawrence Clancy House is a historic house in Memphis, Tennessee. It was built in 1900 for Cornelius Lawrence Clancy, his wife née Julia Pelegrin, and their nine children. Clancy was a grocer and real estate investor who served as a magistrate on the Shelby County Court.

The house was designed in the Queen Anne architectural style. It has been listed on the National Register of Historic Places since November 25, 1983.
