= Mt. Airy (Cordova, Tennessee) =

Historic house in Tennessee, United States

- U.S. National Register of Historic Places
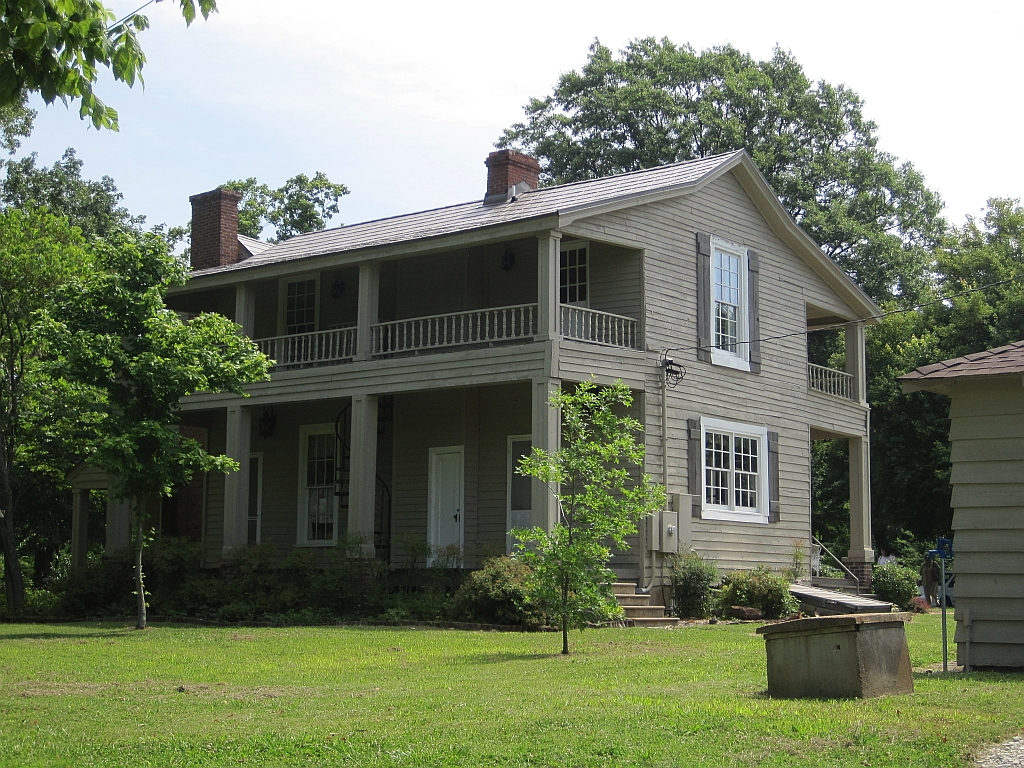

- Location within Tennessee
- Location: 10700 Latting Road, Cordova, Tennessee
- Coordinates: 35°10′50″N 89°42′01″W
- Area: 19 acres (7.7 ha)
- Built: 1835
- Architectural style: Classical Revival, I-House
- NRHP reference No.: 02000011
- Added to NRHP: February 14, 2002

Mt. Airy is a historic house in Cordova, Tennessee. It was built in 1835 for Asbury Crenshaw, his son Timothy, and their relatives. The Crenshaws were settlers who owned slaves. By 1850, it was acquired by Roscoe Feild, a Crenshaw relative who graduated from Princeton University and took part in the California Gold Rush. During the American Civil War, Feild served in the Confederate States Army. The house was subsequently inherited by his descendants, the Lattings.

The house was designed in the Classical Revival architectural style. It has been listed on the National Register of Historic Places since February 14, 2002.
