= Medical Arts Building and Garage =

- U.S. National Register of Historic Places
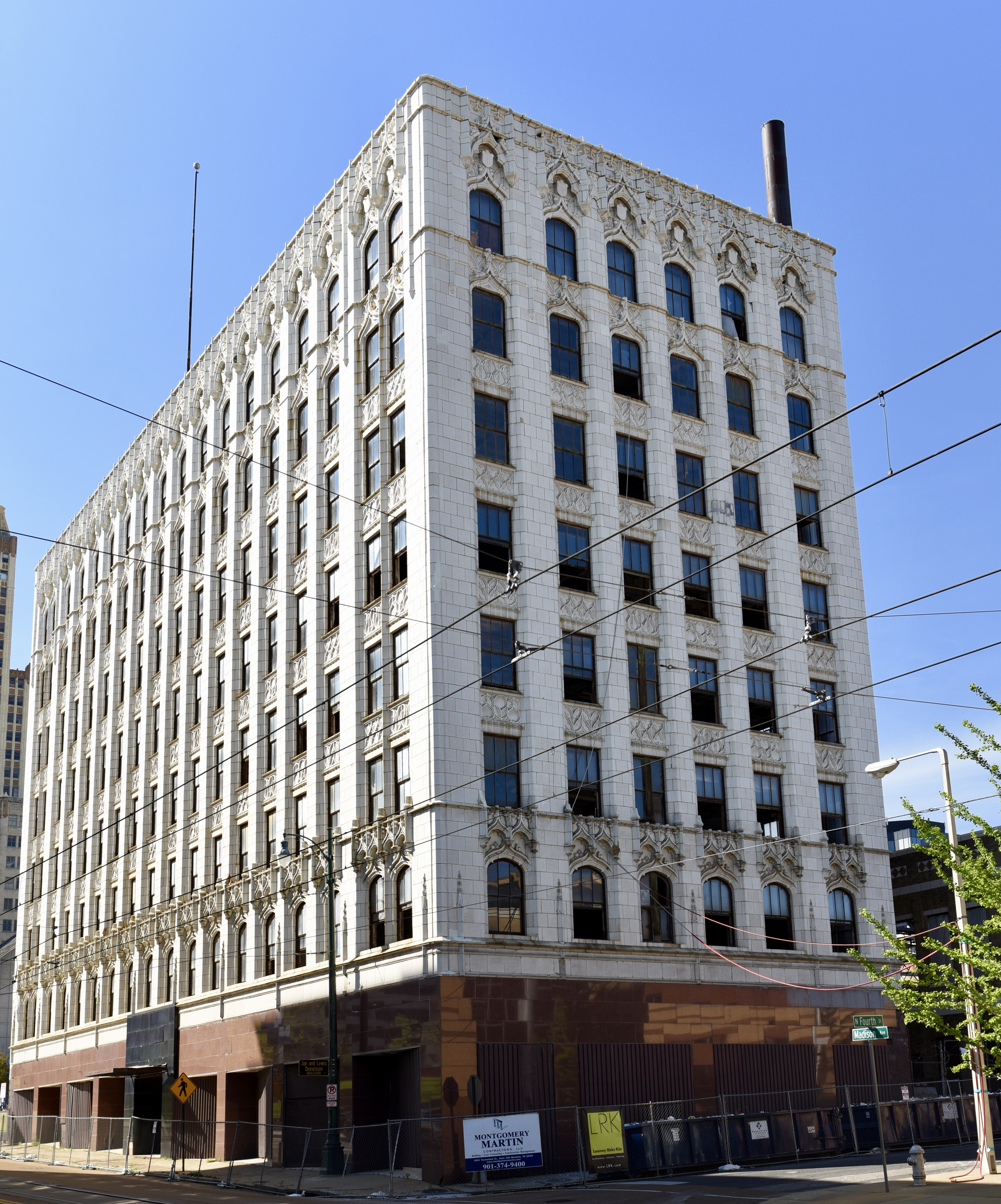
- The building in 2017

- Location within Tennessee Location within the United States
- Location: 248 Madison Avenue and 11 N. 4th Street, Memphis, Tennessee
- Coordinates: 35°08′38″N 90°02′51″W
- Area: less than one acre
- Built: 1925
- Architect: Tietig & Lee
- Architectural style: Late Gothic Revival, Commercial Gothic Revival
- NRHP reference No.: 84003707
- Added to NRHP: August 16, 1984

The Medical Arts Building and Garage, also known as the Hickman Building, is a historic building in Memphis, Tennessee, U.S.. It was built in 1925–1926. Upon its completion, most tenants were members of medical professions like physicians and dentists. There were also medical laboratories. The building was acquired by Francis Gould Hickman, the editor of the Cotton Trade Journal, in the 1950s.

The building was designed by Tietig & Lee in the Gothic Revival architectural style. It has been listed on the National Register of Historic Places since August 16, 1984.
