= Anderson-Coward House =

Historic house in Tennessee, United States

- Anderson--Coward House
- U.S. National Register of Historic Places
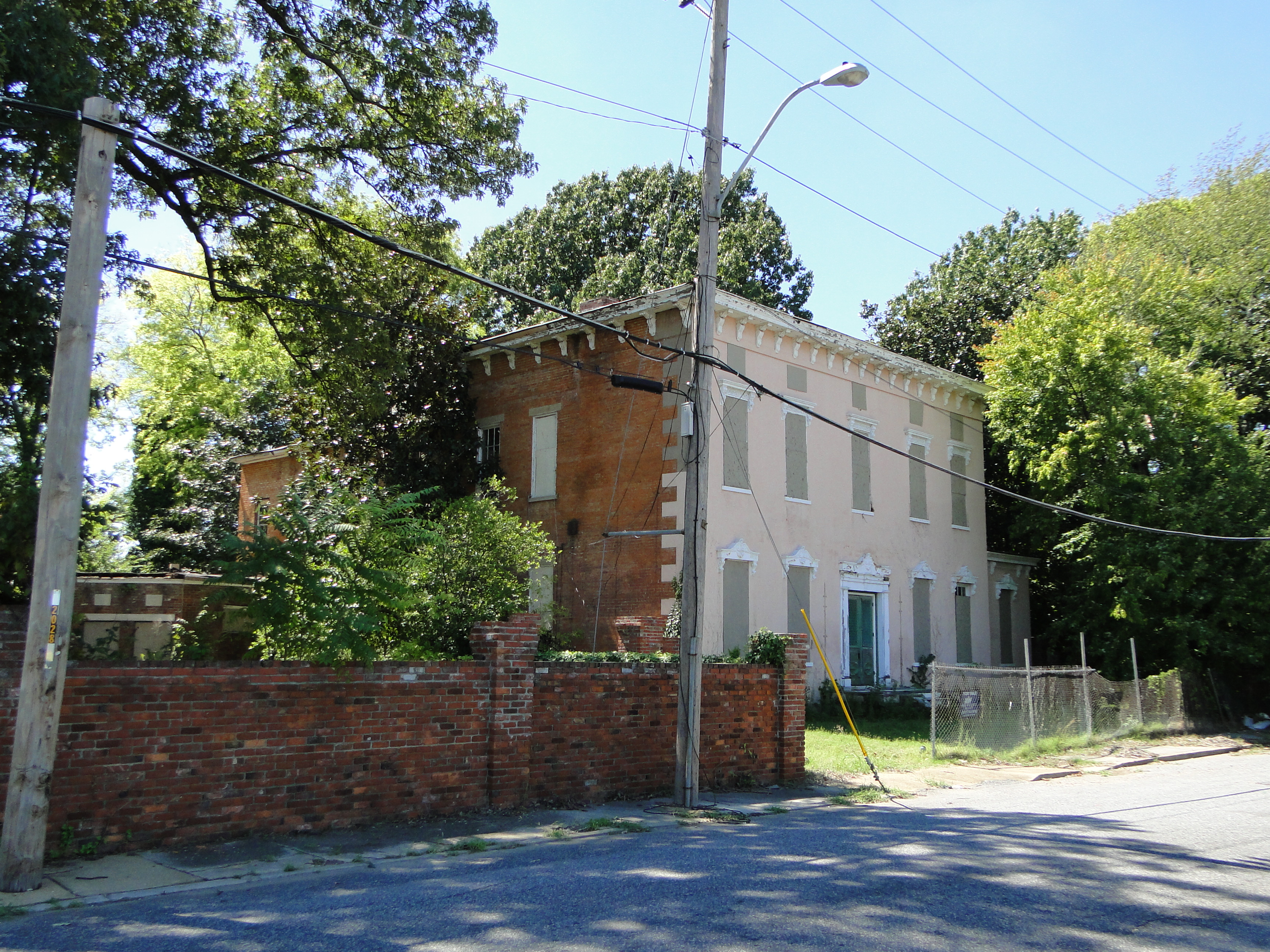
- The Anderson-Coward House in 2012

- Location within Tennessee Location within the United States
- Location: 919 Coward Pl., Memphis, Tennessee
- Coordinates: 35°7′50″N 90°1′53″W
- Area: 1.6 acres (0.65 ha)
- Built: 1852
- Architectural style: Italianate
- NRHP reference No.: 86000404
- Added to NRHP: March 13, 1986

The Anderson-Coward House, also known as Justine's Restaurant, is a historic mansion in Memphis, Tennessee.

== History ==
The mansion was built circa 1852 for Nathaniel Anderson, a planter. It was designed in the Italianate architectural style. It was purchased by H.M. Grosvenor, until it was acquired by William C. Coward as debt settlement. It was passed on to his son, William Holliday Coward. After his death in the early 1900s, it was inherited by his daughter Ida and her husband, Robert O. Johnston, a lawyer and banker.

The mansion was repurposed as a restaurant in 1958.

== Architectural significance ==
It has been listed on the National Register of Historic Places since March 13, 1986.
