= Paisley Hall =

Historic house in Tennessee, United States

- U.S. National Register of Historic Places
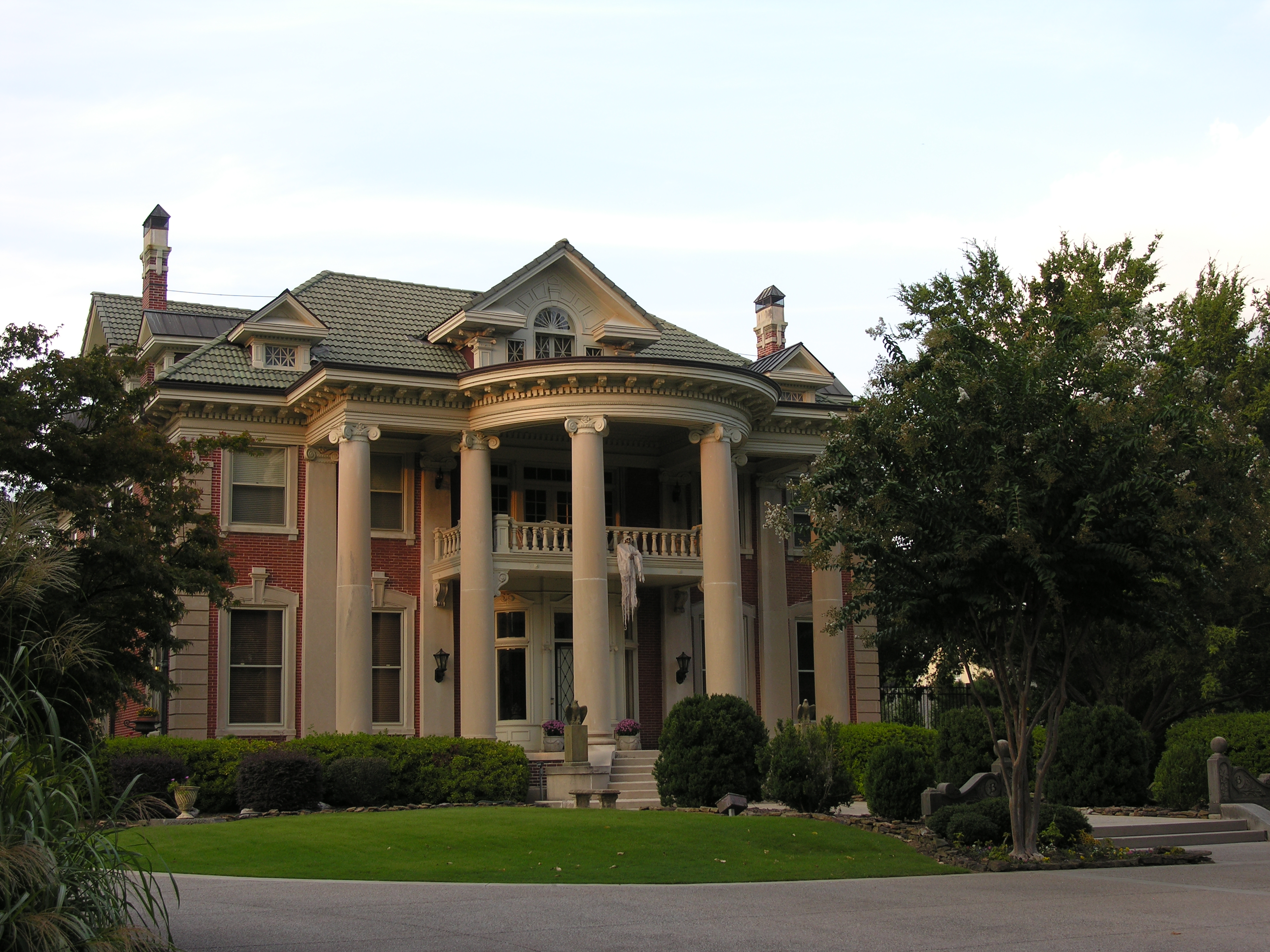
- Paisley Hall in 2014

- Location within Tennessee Location within the United States
- Location: 1822 Overton Park Ave., Memphis, Tennessee
- Area: 4.3 acres (1.7 ha)
- Built: 1908
- Architectural style: Colonial Revival
- NRHP reference No.: 80003869
- Added to NRHP: February 12, 1980

Paisley Hall is a historic mansion in Memphis, Tennessee, USA. It was built from 1908 to 1910 for Colonel Robert Galloway. It has been listed on the National Register of Historic Places since February 12, 1980.
