= Greenwood (Memphis, Tennessee) =

Historic house in Tennessee, United States

- U.S. National Register of Historic Places
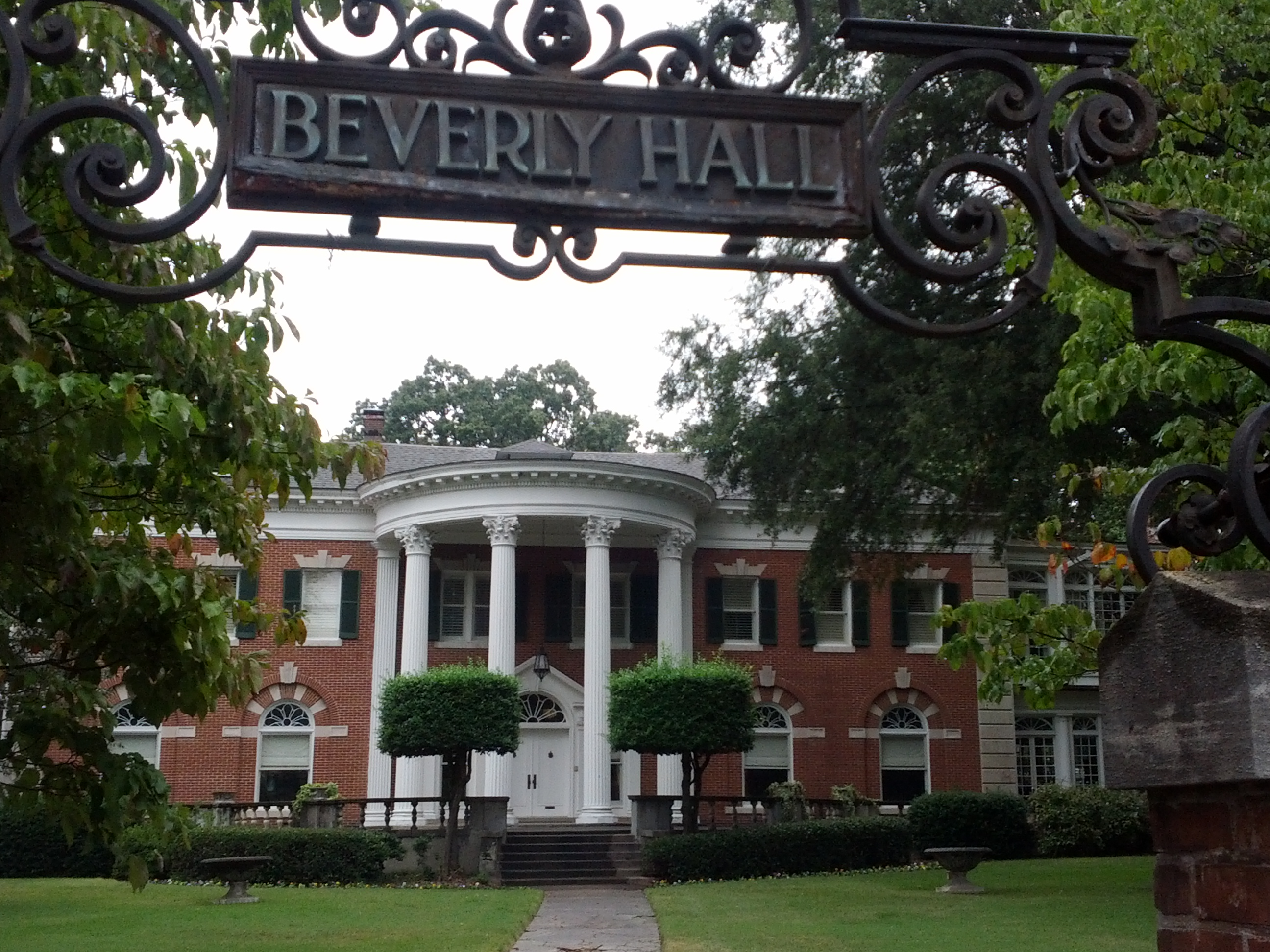
- Greenwood in 2012

- Location within Tennessee Location within the United States
- Location: 1560 Central Avenue, Memphis, Tennessee
- Coordinates: 35°7′36″N 90°0′36″W
- Area: 2 acres (0.81 ha)
- Built: 1904
- Architect: W.J. Dodd (principal); Jones & Furbringer (associate)
- Architectural style: Colonial Revival
- NRHP reference No.: 79002468
- Added to NRHP: July 9, 1979

Greenwood, also known as Beverly Hall, is a historic mansion in Memphis, Tennessee, USA.

== History ==
The two-story mansion was built from 1904 to 1906 for C. Hunter Raine. It was designed in the Colonial Revival architectural style. When it was purchased by Austin Boyd and his wife in 1914, they renamed it Beverly Hall.

It has been listed on the National Register of Historic Places since July 9, 1979.
