= Greenlaw Addition Historic District =

Historic district in Tennessee, United States

- U.S. National Register of Historic Places
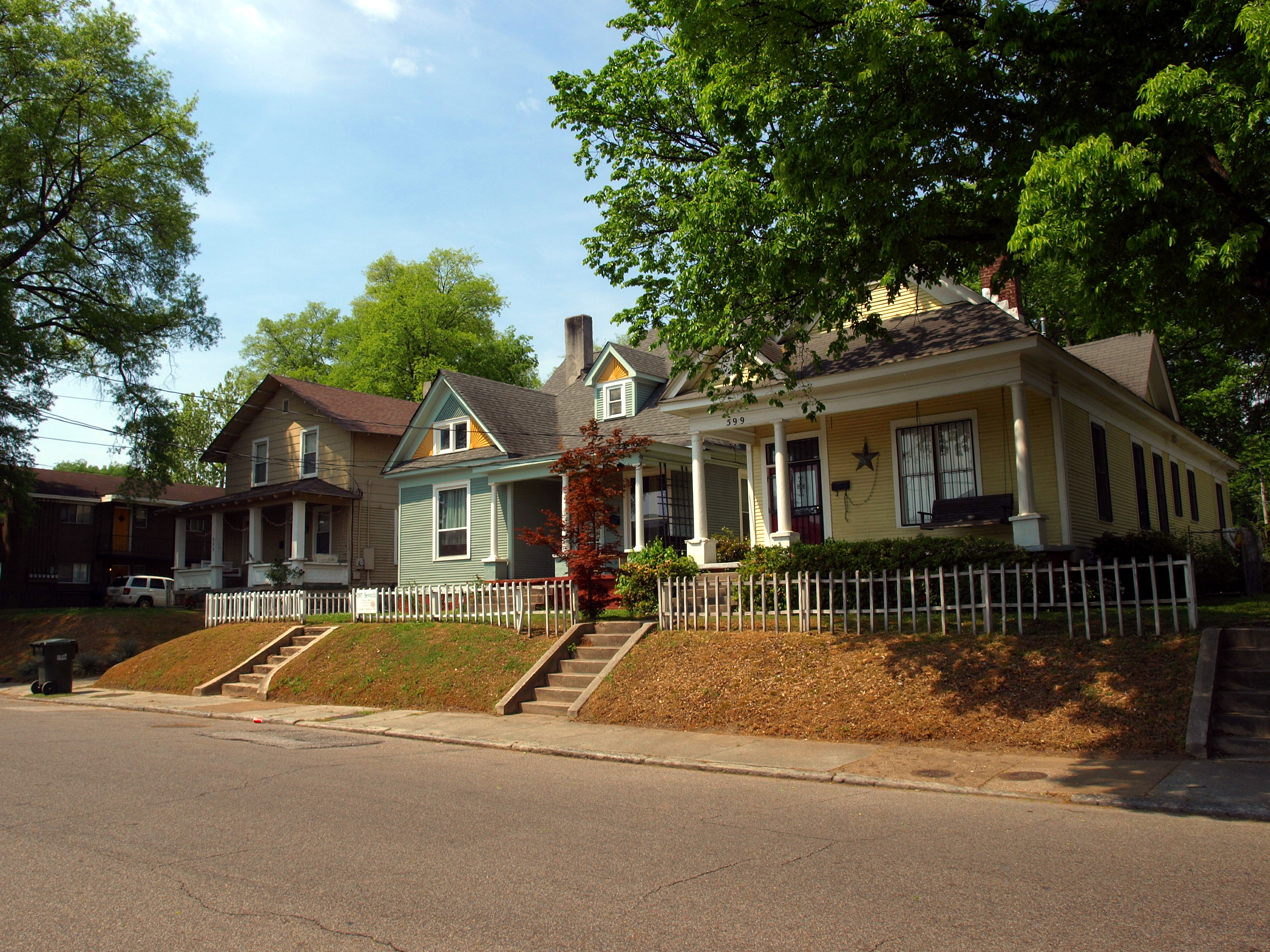
- 593-599 N. 7th Street, in 2017

- Location within Tennessee
- Location: Roughly bounded by Bethel, Thomas, 7th, Auction, and 2nd Sts., Memphis, Tennessee
- Coordinates: 35°09′34″N 90°02′30″W
- Area: 100 acres (40 ha)
- Architectural style: Late 19th and 20th Century Revivals, Bungalow/craftsman, Late Victorian, Shotgun
- NRHP reference No.: 84003704
- Added to NRHP: August 16, 1984

The Greenlaw Addition Historic District, in Memphis, Tennessee, is a historic district which was listed on the National Register of Historic Places in 1984. It included 260 contributing buildings and 76 buildings deemed not to be contributing to its historic character.

Most of the buildings were constructed between 1885 and 1915.

It has a few large residences but most are modest one-story houses, including a concentration of shotgun houses. Various architectural styles are represented, including elements of Greek Revival, Gothic Revival, Italianate, Eastlake, Queen Anne, Romanesque, Colonial Revival, Four Square, Bungalow, and Mission styles. Some commercial buildings, mostly neighborhood corner stores, are included.

The district is roughly bounded by Bethel, Thomas, 7th, A.W. Willis (formerly Auction), and 2nd Sts. in Memphis.

It includes the George C. Love House, which is separately listed on the National Register.
