= John Alexander Austin House =

Historic house in Tennessee, United States

- U.S. National Register of Historic Places
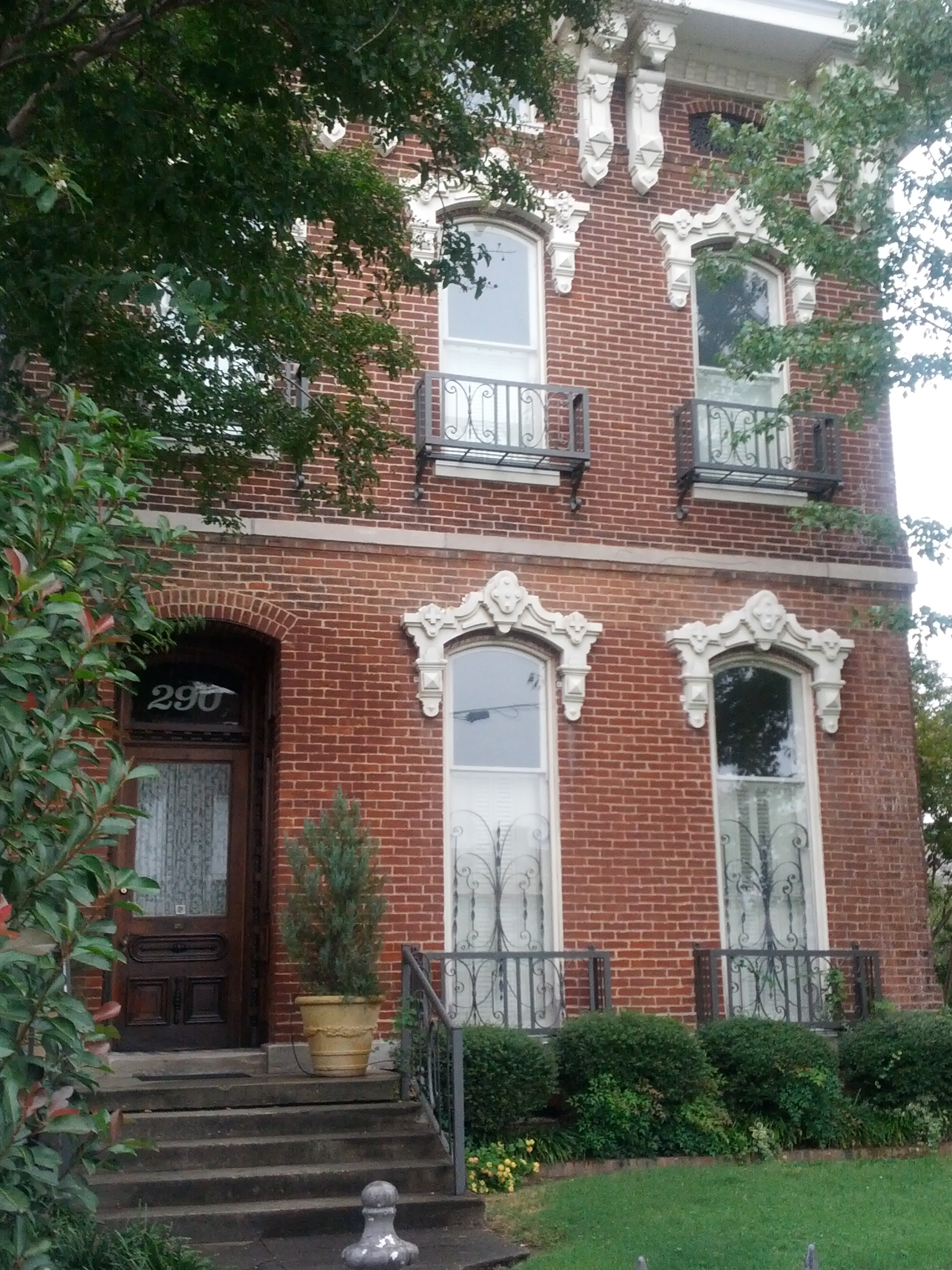
- The John Alexander Austin House in 2012

- Location within Tennessee Location within the United States
- Location: 290 South Front Street, Memphis, Tennessee
- Coordinates: 35°8′19″N 90°3′26″W
- Area: less than one acre
- Built: 1876
- Architectural style: Italianate
- NRHP reference No.: 84003684
- Added to NRHP: July 12, 1984

The John Alexander Austin House is a historic house in Memphis, Tennessee. It was built circa 1876 for John Alexander Austin, a veteran of the Confederate States Army during the American Civil War, and a clothing retailer. It was designed in the Italianate architectural style. It has been listed on the National Register of Historic Places since July 12, 1984.
