= John B. McFerrin House =

Historic house in Tennessee, United States

- U.S. National Register of Historic Places
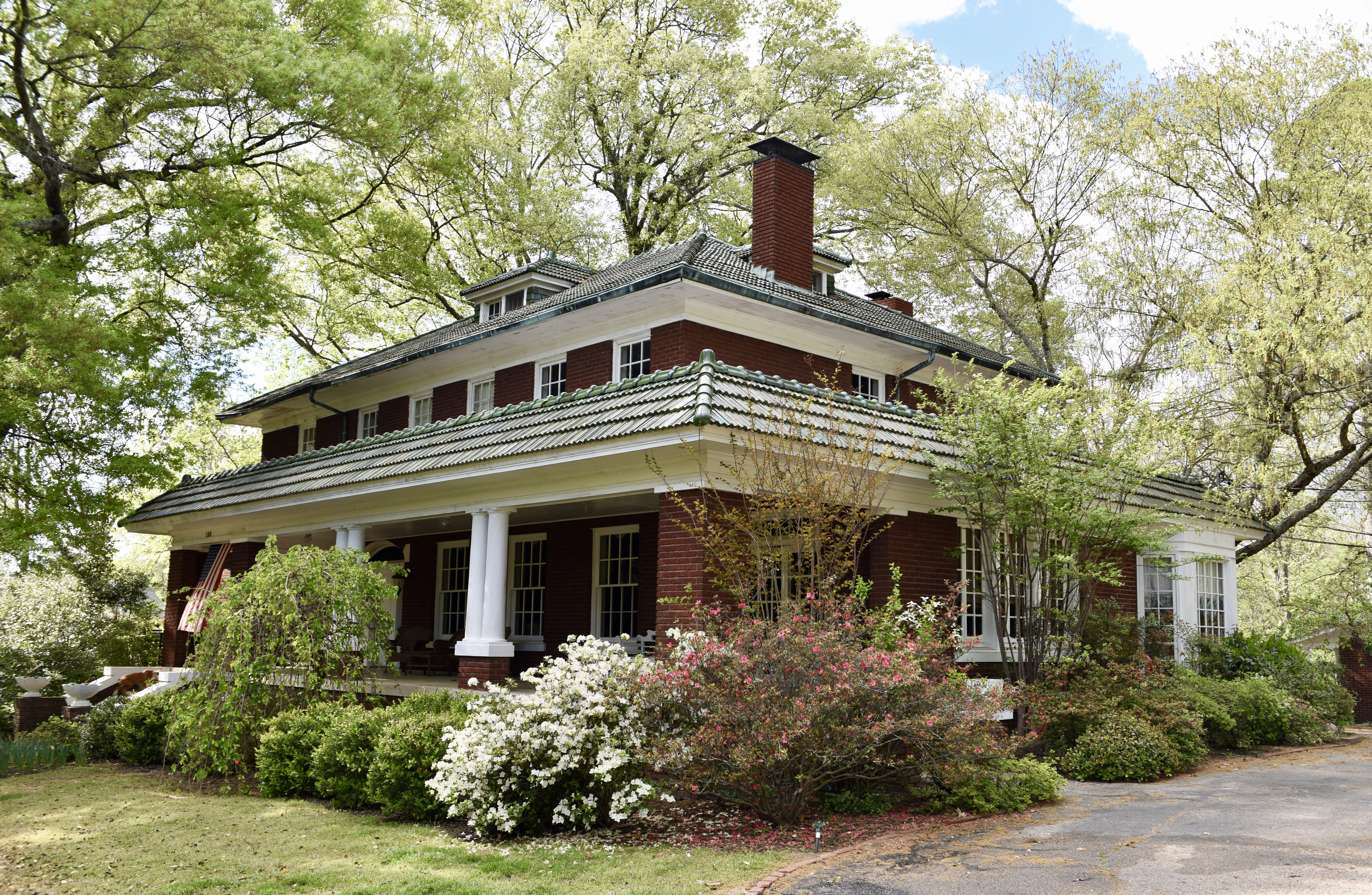
- The John B. McFerring House

- Location within Tennessee Location within the United States
- Location: 156 W. Poplar Ave., Collierville, Tennessee
- Coordinates: 35°2′46″N 89°40′2″W
- Area: 2.9 acres (1.2 ha)
- Built: 1923
- Built by: W.W. McGinnis
- MPS: Collierville MPS
- NRHP reference No.: 91000316
- Added to NRHP: March 29, 1991

The John B. McFerrin House is a historic house in Collierville, Tennessee, United States. It was built in 1923 for John B. McFerrin, a wholesaler. It remained in the McFerrin family until 1941, when it was sold to Ronald B. Smith, Sr. It has been listed on the National Register of Historic Places since March 29, 1991.
