= Robert M. Carrier House =

Historic house in Tennessee, United States

- U.S. National Register of Historic Places
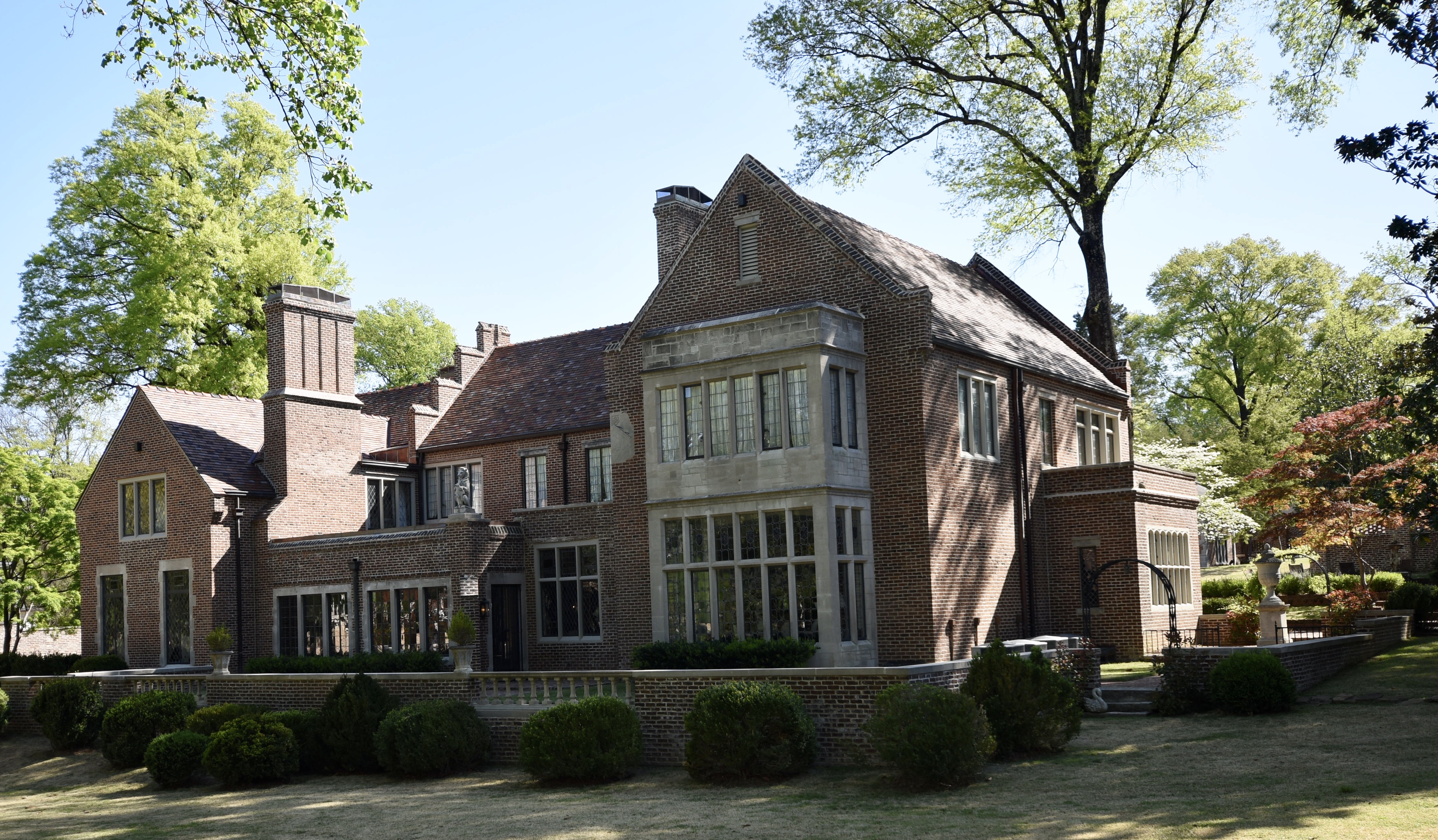
- The Robert M. Carrier House in 2017

- Location within Tennessee Location within the United States
- Location: 642 South Willett Street, Memphis, Tennessee
- Coordinates: 35°7′43″N 90°0′35″W
- Area: less than one acre
- Built: 1926
- Architect: Bryant Fleming
- Architectural style: Tudor Revival; Jacobethan Revival
- NRHP reference No.: 80003860
- Added to NRHP: May 27, 1980

The Robert M. Carrier House, also known as the Matthews House, is a historic house in Memphis, Tennessee, United States. It was built in 1926 for Robert M. Carrier and his wife. In 1974, it was purchased by William S. Matthews, Jr. It was designed in the Jacobean Revival architectural style by Bryant Fleming, a Professor of Architecture at Cornell University. It has been listed on the National Register of Historic Places since May 27, 1980.
