= Eli Rayner House =

Historic house in Tennessee, United States

- U.S. National Register of Historic Places
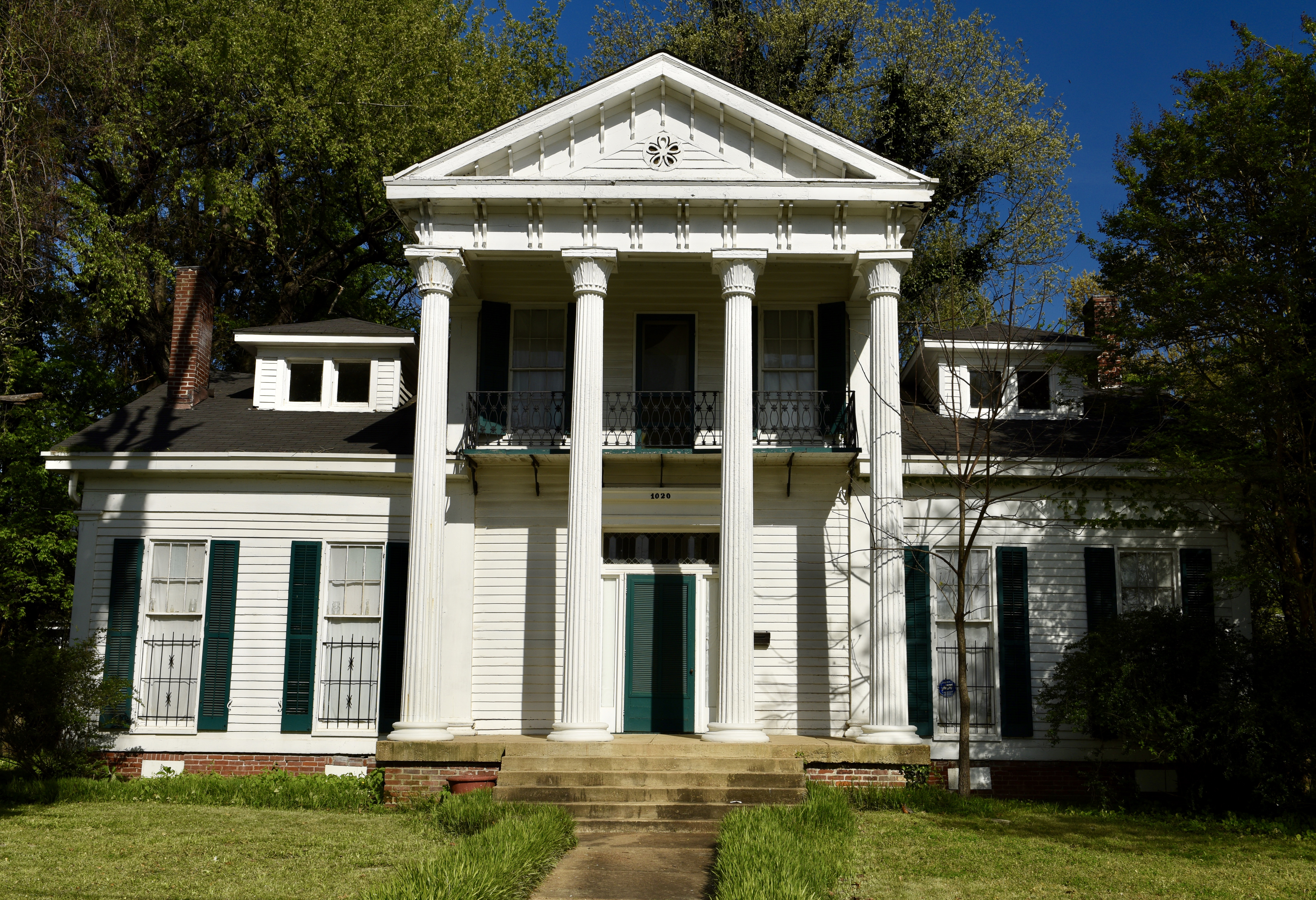
- The Eli Rayner House in 2017

- Location within Tennessee Location within the United States
- Location: 1020 Rayner Street, Memphis, Tennessee
- Coordinates: 35°7′6″N 90°0′40″W
- Area: 1 acre (0.40 ha)
- Built: 1856
- Architectural style: Greek Revival
- NRHP reference No.: 77001292
- Added to NRHP: May 9, 1977

The Eli Rayner House is a historic house in Memphis, Tennessee, U.S.. It was built in 1856 for Eli Rayner, a planter, and his wife May A. Jones. The Rayner were well-connected: Rayner's first cousin was Kenneth Rayner, and their daughter Irene married Thomas B. Turley.

The house is a relatively sophisticated Late Greek Revival-style building, with "elegantly proportioned fluted columns capped with lotus leaf Corinthian capitals, supporting the pediment with simple scrolled triglyphs...." A cast-iron balcony, original or from before 1900, is at the second floor level within the two-story portico.

The house has been listed on the National Register of Historic Places since May 9, 1977.
