= George Collins Love House =

Historic house in Tennessee, United States

- U.S. National Register of Historic Places
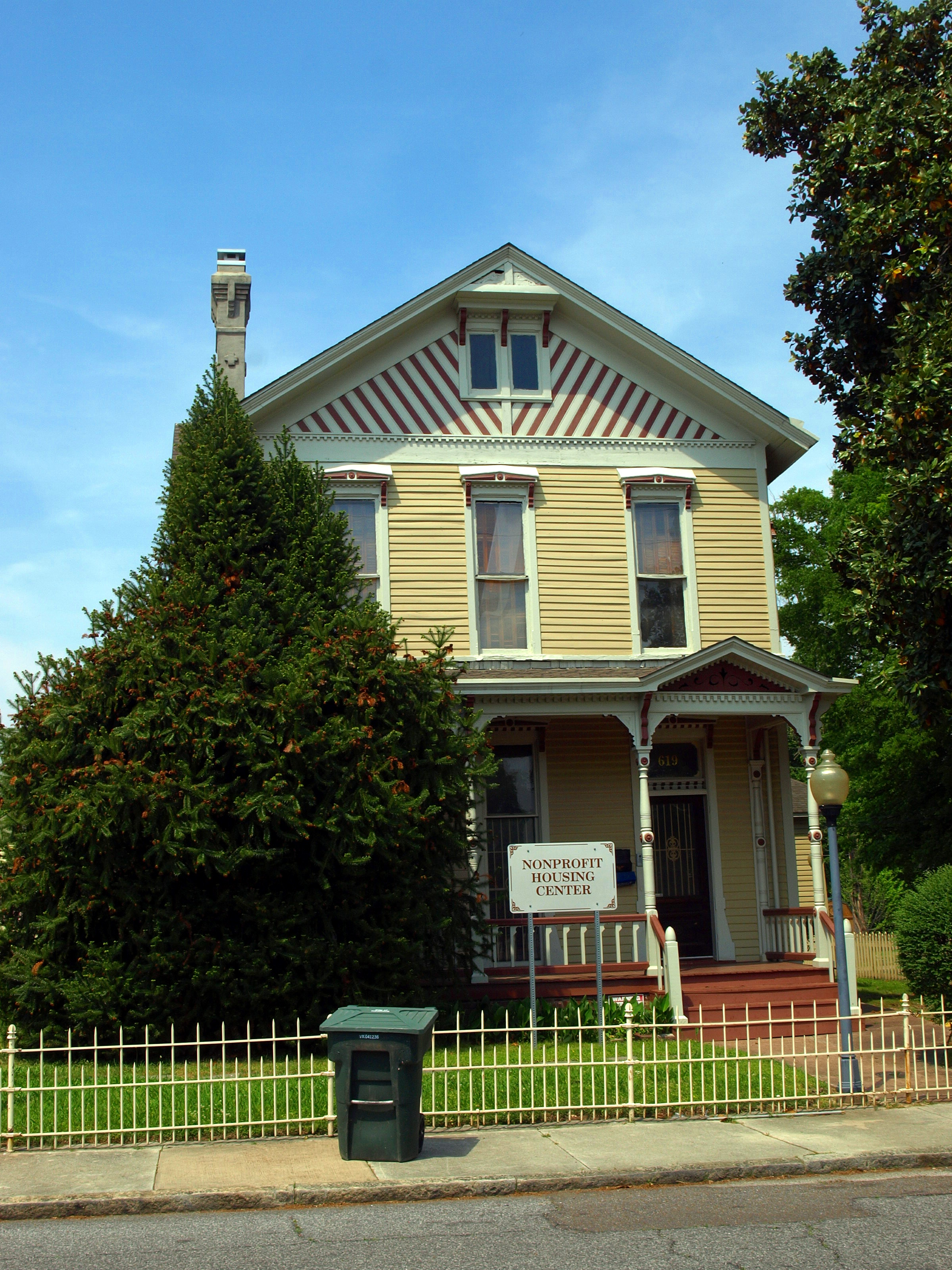
- The George Collins Love House in 2017

- Location within Tennessee
- Location: 619 North 7th Street, Memphis, Tennessee
- Coordinates: 35°09′33″N 90°02′22″W
- Area: 0.4 acres (0.16 ha)
- Built: 1889
- Architectural style: Late Victorian
- NRHP reference No.: 79002472
- Added to NRHP: April 2, 1979

The George Collins Love House is a historic house in Memphis, Tennessee. It was built for its namesake, the interim mayor of Memphis in 1915–1916. It is listed on the National Register of Historic Places.

== History ==
The house was built in 1889 for George Collins Love, a businessman who served on the Memphis City Council. He also served as the interim mayor of Memphis from November 4, 1915, to February 12, 1916, until his ally, E. H. Crump, regained his office.

== Architectural significance ==
The house was designed in the Victorian architectural style. It has been listed on the National Register of Historic Places since April 2, 1979.
