= Second Congregational Church (Memphis, Tennessee) =

Historic church in Tennessee, United States

- U.S. National Register of Historic Places
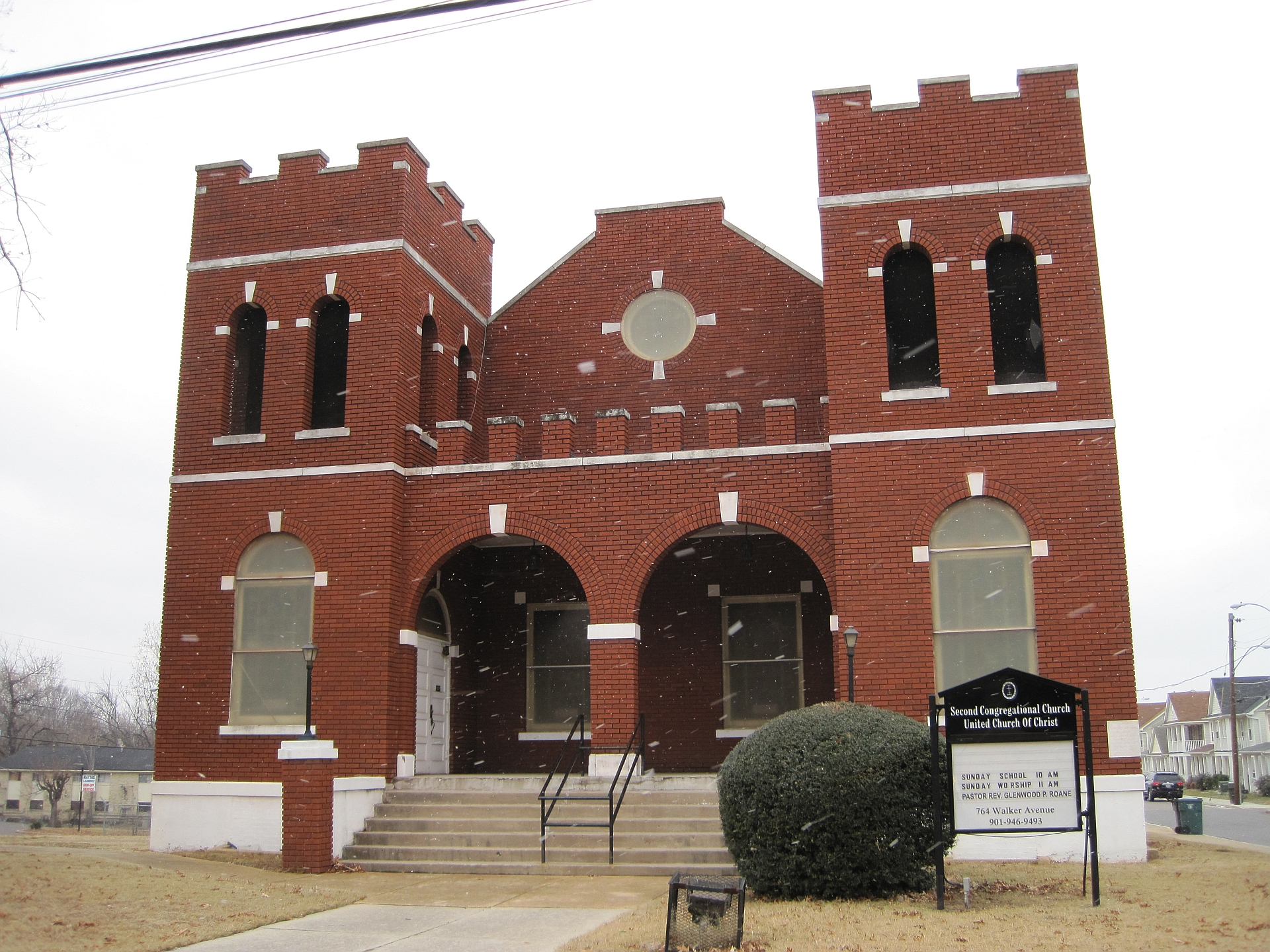

- Location within Tennessee Location within the United States
- Location: 764 Walker Ave., Memphis, Tennessee
- Coordinates: 35°7′10″N 90°2′11″W
- Area: less than one acre
- Built: 1928
- Built by: Frank Nesbit and Harold E. Smith
- NRHP reference No.: 82004053
- Added to NRHP: August 26, 1982

The Second Congregational Church in Memphis, Tennessee is a historic church structure at 764 Walker Avenue. The building was started in 1928 and was added to the National Register of Historic Places in 1982.

It was designed and/or built by Frank Nesbit and Harold E. Smith.

The church was founded in 1868. It is presently affiliated with the United Church of Christ, one of three such congregations in the Memphis area.

== See also ==
- National Register of Historic Places listings in Shelby County, Tennessee
