= Abraham Lowenstein House =

Historic house in Tennessee, United States

- U.S. National Register of Historic Places
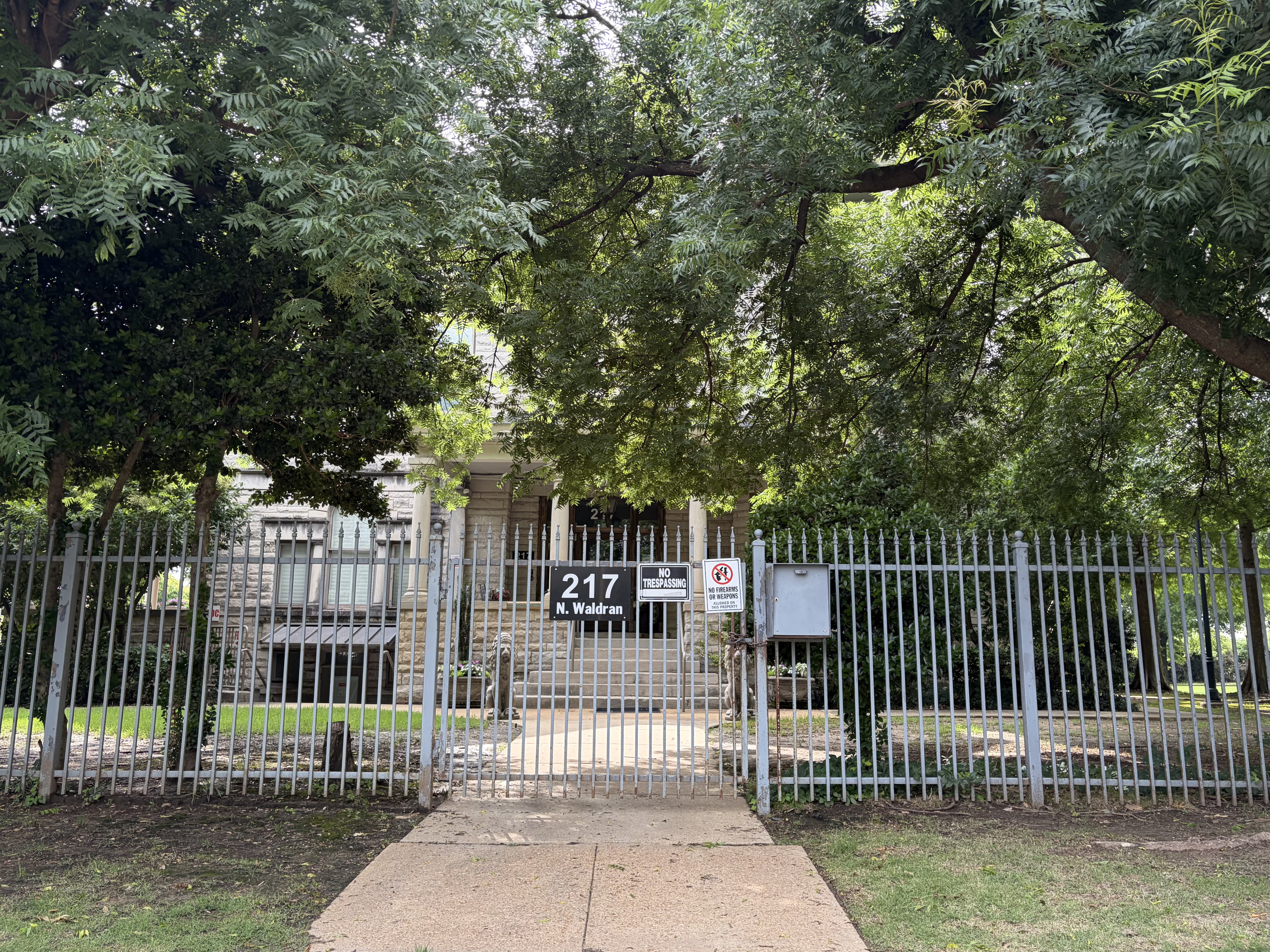
- The entrance of the Lowenstein House in 2026

- Location within Tennessee
- Location: 217 North Waldran Boulevard, Memphis, Tennessee
- Coordinates: 35°08′44″N 90°01′26″W
- Area: 1 acre (0.40 ha)
- Built: 1901
- Architectural style: Queen Anne
- NRHP reference No.: 84003705
- Added to NRHP: January 5, 1984

The Abraham Lowenstein House is a historic house in Memphis, Tennessee. It was built in 1901 for Abraham Lowenstein, a Jewish Swiss immigrant who co-founded a department store in Memphis with his brothers. It belonged to the Beethoven Club from 1922 to 1946.

The house was designed in the Queen Anne architectural style. It has been listed on the National Register of Historic Places since January 5, 1984.
