= Vance-Pontotoc Historic District =

Historic district in Tennessee, United States

- Formerly listed on the U.S. National Register of Historic Places
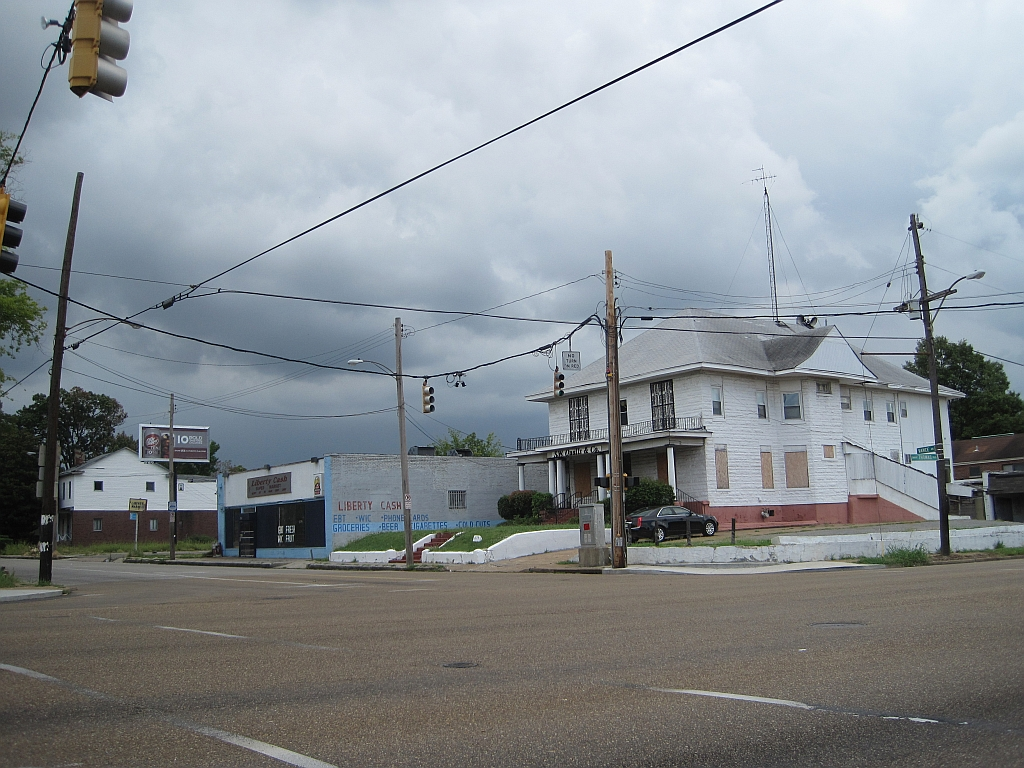
- Buildings on Vance Avenue within the bounds of the former historic district
- Location: An irregular pattern along Vance and Pontotoc Aves., Memphis, Tennessee
- Area: 31 acres (13 ha)
- Architectural style: Late Victorian, Italianate, Queen Anne, Shotgun
- NRHP reference No.: 80003874

Significant dates
- Added to NRHP: March 19, 1980
- Removed from NRHP: March 18, 1987

The Vance-Pontotoc Historic District, in Memphis, Tennessee, was a historic district which was listed on the National Register of Historic Places. It included 69 contributing buildings on 31 acres (13 ha). It was listed in 1980 for its architectural significance. It included a number of early shotgun houses, which the Tennessee Encyclopedia has noted were endangered and "disappearing rapidly". The shotgun houses and/or other residences included Late Victorian, Queen Anne, and Italianate styling.

The district borders made an irregular pattern along Vance and Pontotoc Avenues in Memphis. Twelve of the buildings were destroyed by fire between 1979 and 1982. Only 12 of the 65 listed buildings remain. The district was delisted from the National Register on March 18, 1987.
