= Germantown Redoubt =

- U.S. National Register of Historic Places
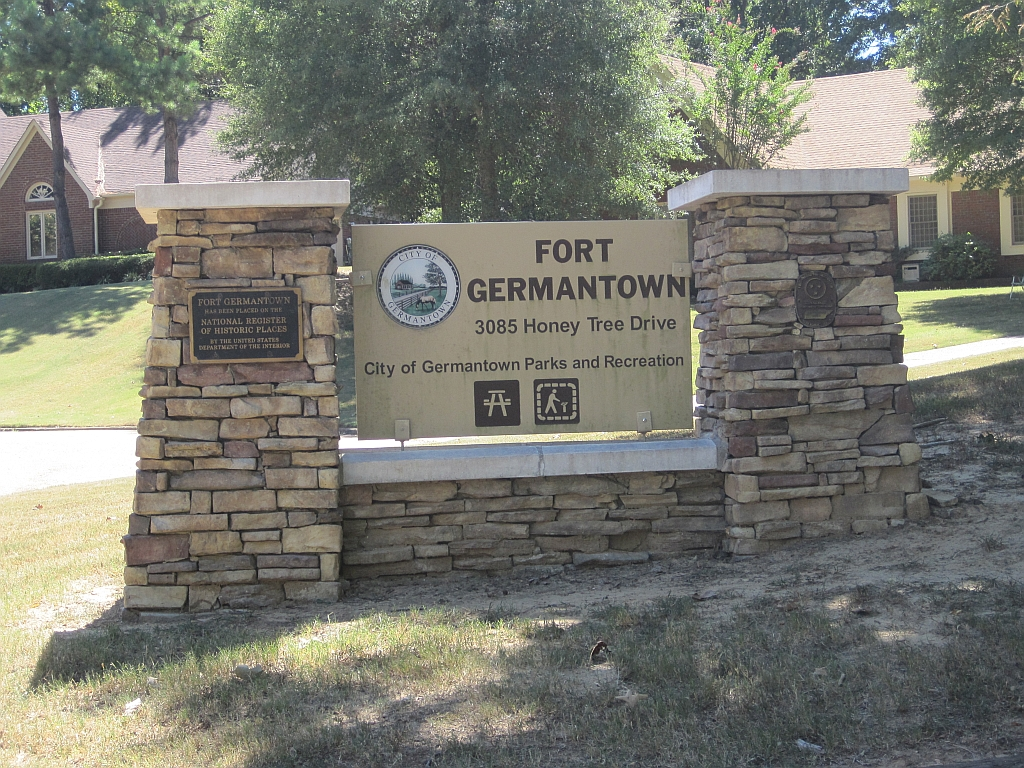

- Location within Tennessee Location within the United States
- Location: 3085 Honey Tree Drive; Germantown, Tennessee; United States
- Coordinates: 35°04′25″N 89°47′37″W
- Built: June 1863
- NRHP reference No.: 91000623
- Added to NRHP: June 6, 1991

The Germantown Redoubt (more commonly known as Fort Germantown) is a redoubt built during the Civil War by Union troops. This was built along a relatively sharp bend of the Memphis and Charleston Railroad (now the Memphis Subdivision of the Norfolk Southern Railway). It is located a couple miles east of the Old Germantown neighborhood in Germantown, Tennessee. Federal troops built the garrison after they took control of Corinth, Mississippi (about 90 miles east of Memphis) and the railroad. From an archaeological standpoint, it is significant in that it is one of the few intact defense structures found of its size. This has given historians a perspective on how these forts were constructed and artifacts found there have given a hint about the daily life at the fort.

Today, the area is protected in a 5-acre Germantown City Park, located within a suburban neighborhood. The earthen structure is still intact, but the original timber retaining walls were destroyed in late 1863 (a portion of an example wall still remains). Several replica cannons are on site, as well as educational markers. The park includes a small parking area and playground. The Norfolk Southern railroad is still visible from the fort through a clearing.
