= Delmar-Lema Historic District =

Historic district in Tennessee, United States

- U.S. National Register of Historic Places
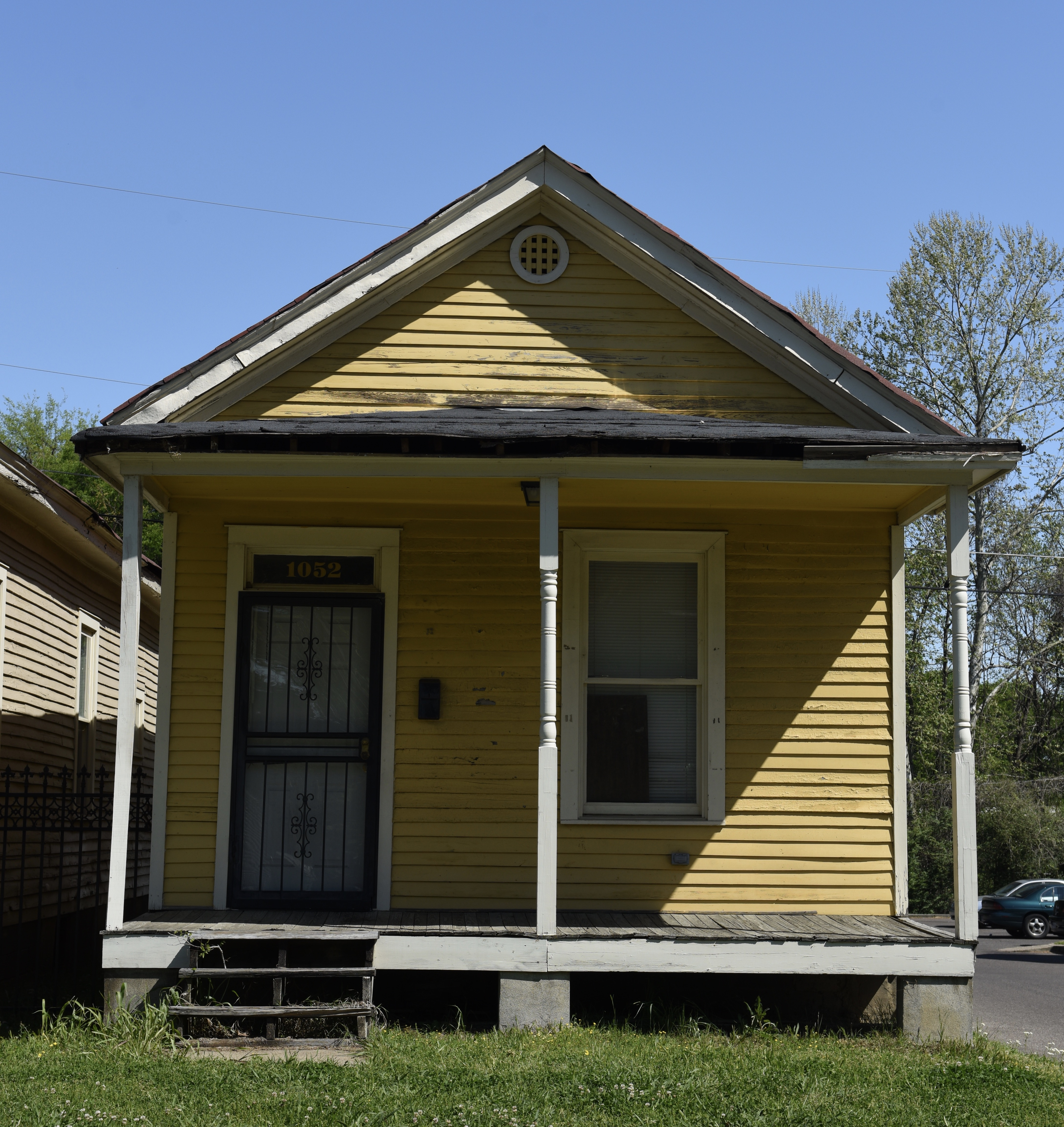
- 1052 Delmar Avenue, in 2017

- Location within Tennessee
- Location: 1044-1066 Delmar Ave.; 1044-1060, 1041-1061 Lemar Pl., Memphis, Tennessee
- Coordinates: 35°08′54″N 90°01′31″W
- Area: 1.9 acres (0.77 ha)
- Built: 1895
- Architectural style: Bungalow/craftsman, Queen Anne, shotgun
- NRHP reference No.: 98000242
- Added to NRHP: March 12, 1998

The Delmar-Lema Historic District, in Memphis, Tennessee, is a historic district which was listed on the National Register of Historic Places in 1998. It included 18 contributing buildings on 1.9 acres (0.77 ha).

It includes houses at 1044-1066 Delmar Avenue and at 1044-1060 and 1041-1061 Lemar Place, in Memphis.

The houses are shotgun houses with either Queen Anne or Craftsman influences.
