= Deaths in July 2018 =

The following is a list of notable deaths in July 2018.

Entries for each day are listed alphabetically by surname. A typical entry lists information in the following sequence:

- Name, age, country of citizenship at birth, subsequent country of citizenship (if applicable), reason for notability, cause of death (if known), and reference.

== July 2018 ==
=== 1 ===
- Armando, 88, Dutch artist.
- Bruce Baker, 72, American geneticist.
- Euline Brock, 86, American politician.
- Amos Cardarelli, 88, Italian footballer (Roma, Internazionale, national team).
- Roy Carr, 73, British music journalist (NME, Vox), heart attack.
- François Corbier, 73, French songwriter and television presenter, cancer.
- Bozhidar Dimitrov, 72, Bulgarian historian, heart attack.
- Brad Dye, 84, American politician, Lieutenant Governor of Mississippi (1980–1992).
- Ayanna Dyette, 32, Trinidadian volleyball player, cervical cancer.
- Dick Feagler, 79, American journalist (The Plain Dealer), playwright, and television personality (WKYC, WEWS).
- Peter Firmin, 89, British television producer (Bagpuss, Noggin the Nog, Clangers).
- Harvey Gentry, 92, American baseball player (New York Giants).
- Gordon Hillman, 74, British archaeobotanist.
- Shirley Huffman, 89, American politician, Mayor of Hillsboro, Oregon (1985–1993).
- Leonard Isaacson, 92, American chemist and composer.
- Dame Gillian Lynne, 92, British dancer and choreographer (The Phantom of the Opera, Cats, The Muppet Show), pneumonia.
- Anacleto Sima Ngua, 82, Equatorial Guinean Roman Catholic prelate, Bishop of Bata (1982–2002).
- Gianfranco Petris, 81, Italian footballer (Fiorentina, Lazio, national team).
- Merv Richards, 87, New Zealand pole vaulter.
- Joe Rosenthal, 97, Canadian sculptor.
- Awtar Singh, 52, Afghan politician, loya jirga representative for Paktia, bombing.
- Leo Thiffault, 73, Canadian ice hockey player (Minnesota North Stars).
- Terence Thomas, Baron Thomas of Macclesfield, 80, British banker and politician.
- Julian Tudor-Hart, 91, British physician and writer.

=== 2 ===
- Henry Butler, 68, American jazz pianist, cancer.
- Emma Černá, 81, Czech actress (Adelheid, Day for My Love, Viy).
- Russell Crossley, 91, English footballer (Liverpool, Shrewsbury Town).
- Edward Dailey, 85, American ophthalmologist and tennis player.
- Sutanto Djuhar, 90, Chinese-Indonesian entrepreneur, co-founder of the Salim Group, Indofood and Indocement.
- Richard S. Ellis, 71, American mathematician, bile duct cancer.
- Patrick Finnegan, 68, American Army General and lawyer, President of Longwood University (2010–2012), heart attack.
- Henri Froment-Meurice, 95, French diplomat, Ambassador to the Soviet Union (1979–1981) and West Germany (1981–1983).
- Richard Gagliardi, 84, American ice hockey player and coach.
- Antonio Halili, 72, Filipino politician, Mayor of Tanauan City (since 2013), shot.
- Shih-Ying Lee, 100, Chinese-born American engineer and inventor.
- Maurice Lemaître, 92, French artist.
- Liu Boli, 87, Chinese nuclear chemist, academician of the Chinese Academy of Engineering.
- Alan Longmuir, 70, Scottish bass guitarist (Bay City Rollers).
- Denis Mitchison, 98, British bacteriologist.
- Jayant Ganpat Nadkarni, 86, Indian Navy admiral, Chief of the Naval Staff (1987–1990).
- Paul Pruitt, 96, American politician.
- Ángel Roberto Seifart, 76, Paraguayan judge and politician, Vice President (1993–1998).
- Shuhaimi Shafiei, 50, Malaysian politician, cancer.
- Meic Stephens, 79, Welsh writer and editor.
- Gavin Trippe, 78, British motorcycle racing promoter and publisher.
- Kurt Ucko, 96, American Olympic field hockey player.
- Katsura Utamaru, 81, Japanese rakugo storyteller, pulmonary disease.
- Bill Watrous, 79, American jazz trombonist.

=== 3 ===
- Pierre-Ernest Abandzounou, 77–78, Congolese politician, stroke.
- Joe Adams, 94, American music manager (Ray Charles) and actor (Carmen Jones).
- Gary Bold, 79-80, New Zealand physicist.
- Alan Diaz, 71, American photographer, Pulitzer Prize winner (2001).
- Richard Erdall, 85, American politician.
- Ali Haydar Kaytan, 66, Turkish militant, co-founder of the PKK, shot.
- Halima Khatun, 84, Bangladeshi academic, writer and activist.
- Thérèse Kleindienst, 101, French librarian.
- Greg Krosnes, 50, American actor, complications from diabetes.
- Krishna Kumari, 92, Indian royal, politician and philanthropist, last Maharani of Jodhpur, member of the Lok Sabha (1971–1977).
- Henri Martre, 90, French telecommunications engineer.
- Barthélemy Mukenge, 92, Congolese politician, President of Kasaï (1960–1962, 1962).
- Robby Müller, 78, Dutch cinematographer (Paris, Texas, Dancer in the Dark, Dead Man), vascular dementia.
- Boris Orlov, 73, Russian gymnastics coach.
- John Prest, 89, British historian.
- Lorraine Rodgers, 97, American WASP pilot.
- Takahiro Satō, 41, Japanese manga writer, acute coronary syndrome.
- Bradford A. Smith, 86, American astronomer, complications of myasthenia gravis.
- Arthur Stinchcombe, 85, American sociologist.
- Richard Swift, 41, American singer-songwriter, producer and musician (The Shins, The Black Keys, Starflyer 59), complications from hepatitis.
- Guilherme Uchoa, 71, Brazilian politician, President of the Legislative Assembly of Pernambuco, pulmonary edema.
- Dave VanDam, 63, American voice actor and impressionist (David Letterman, Barack Obama), member of the Wack Pack.
- Wang Jian, 56, Chinese businessman, co-founder of Hainan Airlines and HNA Group, fall.

=== 4 ===
- Boukary Adji, 79, Nigerien politician, Prime Minister (1996).
- E. Riley Anderson, 85, American judge, Chief Justice of the Tennessee Supreme Court (1994–1996, 1997–1998, 1998–2001).
- Carmen Campagne, 58, Canadian singer and children's entertainer, Juno winner (1989), cancer.
- Georges-Emmanuel Clancier, 104, French poet and novelist.
- Cathy Conn, 73, member of folk band “Friend & Lover”Friend & Lover
- Ernst W. Hamburger, 85, Brazilian physicist, lymphoma.
- Rogelio Mangahas, 79, Filipino poet and writer.
- Darrell McNeil, 60, American animator (Teenage Mutant Ninja Turtles, Jem, James Bond Jr.).
- Harry M. Miller, 84, New Zealand-born Australian promoter, publicist and talent agent.
- Ali Qanso, 70, Lebanese politician, cancer.
- Alan S. Rabson, 92, American pathologist and cancer researcher.
- Donovan Webster, 59, American journalist, suicide.

=== 5 ===
- Jonathan Barker, 65-66, American-born Canadian film producer (Camilla, Journey to Mecca).
- François Budet, 78, French singer-songwriter, novelist, and poet.
- Adamu Ciroma, 83, Nigerian politician and banker, Minister of Finance (1999–2003).
- Alexandra Denisova, 95, Canadian ballerina.
- Donald J. Farish, 75, American educator, President of Roger Williams University (since 2011).
- Evgeny Golod, 83, Russian mathematician.
- Skënder Hyka, 73, Albanian footballer (17 Nëntori, national team).
- Claude Lanzmann, 92, French documentarian (Shoah, The Last of the Unjust, Pourquoi Israël).
- Jim Malloy, 87, American recording engineer (Elvis Presley, Johnny Cash, Henry Mancini), Grammy winner (1964).
- Gerald Messadié, 87, French author.
- Ed Schultz, 64, American broadcaster (The Ed Show, The Ed Schultz Show) and political commentator.
- Kenneth Shearwood, 96, English cricketer.
- Michel Suffran, 87, French novelist.
- Jean-Louis Tauran, 75, French Roman Catholic cardinal, President of the PCID (since 2007) and Camerlengo of the Holy Roman Church (since 2014), Parkinson's disease.
- Hubert Zafke, 97, German military officer.

=== 6 ===
- Omran al-Zoubi, 58, Syrian politician.
- Donald D. Belcher, 79, American executive, CEO of Banta Corporation.
- Eugène Bellemare, 86, Canadian politician, MP for Carleton-Gloucester (1988–2004).
- Barbara Blackmun, 90, American art historian and museum director.
- Richard Cobb-Stevens, 83, American philosopher.
- Gilbert Facchinetti, 82, Swiss football executive, President of Neuchâtel Xamax (1979–2005).
- Jeremy Gold, 75, American actuary and economist.
- J. Frederick Grassle, 78, American marine biologist.
- Bruce Hunter, 79, American Olympic swimmer (1960).
- Vlatko Ilievski, 33, Macedonian pop singer and actor.
- Kimishige Ishizaka, 92, Japanese immunologist, discovered the antibody class IgE, heart failure.
- Ron Lollar, 69, American politician, member of the Tennessee House of Representatives (since 2006), heart attack.
- Bruce Maher, 80, American football player, (Detroit Lions, New York Giants), cancer.
- Vince Martin, 81, American folk singer ("Cindy, Oh Cindy"), pulmonary fibrosis.
- Colin Maxwell, 74, Scottish-born Canadian politician.
- Clifford Rozier, 45, American basketball player (Golden State Warriors, Toronto Raptors, Minnesota Timberwolves), heart attack.
- Antonio Toledo Corro, 99, Mexican politician, Governor of Sinaloa (1981–1986), cerebral infarction.
- Amritlal Vegad, 89, Indian author.
- Japanese convicted murderers from the Aum Shinrikyo cult, executed by hanging.
  - Shoko Asahara, 63, leader.
  - Seiichi Endo, 58.
  - Kiyohide Hayakawa, 68.
  - Yoshihiro Inoue, 48.
  - Tomomitsu Niimi, 54.
  - Masami Tsuchiya, 53.

=== 7 ===
- Feliciano Amaral, 97, Brazilian pastor and evangelical singer.
- Alexander Bogomolny, 54, Israeli-American mathematician.
- Ralph T. Browning, 76, American Air Force pilot.
- John Dunlop, 78, British racehorse trainer.
- William Dunlop, 32, Northern Irish motorcycle racer, collision during practice.
- Paul Fetler, 98, American composer.
- Yvonne Francis-Gibson, 77, Saint Vincent and the Grenadines politician and trade unionist, MP (1989–1998).
- John R. Harris, 84, American economist.
- Bret Hoffmann, 51, American death metal singer (Malevolent Creation), colorectal cancer.
- Tyler Honeycutt, 27, American basketball player (UCLA, Sacramento Kings), suicide by gunshot.
- Alan Johnson, 81, American choreographer (The Producers, Young Frankenstein), Emmy winner (1972, 1980, 1988), Parkinson's disease.
- Hacène Lalmas, 75, Algerian footballer.
- Levko Lukyanenko, 89, Ukrainian political Soviet-era dissident and politician, Deputy (1990–1992, 1995–1998, 2002–2007) and author of the Declaration of Independence of Ukraine.
- Prince Michel of Bourbon-Parma, 92, French royal, soldier and race car driver.
- Firuz Mustafayev, 84, Azerbaijani politician, Prime Minister (1992).
- Masayuki Nagare, 95, Japanese sculptor.
- Luigi Ossola, 80, Italian footballer (Varese, Roma).
- Grant Reuber, 91, Canadian economist.
- Rani Sarker, 86, Bangladeshi film actress (Devdas).
- Peter Sawyer, 90, British historian.
- Sir Maurice Shock, 92, British educationalist and university administrator, Vice-Chancellor of the University of Leicester (1977–1987).
- Tessa Tennant, 59, British green investment campaigner, cancer.
- Terry Todd, 80, American weightlifter and sports historian.

=== 8 ===
- Jack Aylmer, 84, American politician.
- Pema Browne, 90, American abstract artist.
- Tom Gallagher, 77, American diplomat.
- Alan Gilzean, 79, Scottish footballer (Dundee, Tottenham Hotspur, national team), brain tumour.
- Tab Hunter, 86, American actor (Damn Yankees, Grease 2) and singer ("Young Love"), blood clot.
- M. M. Jacob, 90, Indian politician, Governor of Meghalaya (1995–2007).
- Priyani Jayasinghe, 51, Sri Lankan singer, stabbed.
- Sumit Kalia, 30, Indian cricketer.
- Tazir Kariyev, 29, Russian footballer (FC Angusht Nazran), shot.
- Anthony Kirk-Greene, 93, British historian.
- Billy Knight, 39, American basketball player (UCLA Bruins), suicide by jumping.
- Oliver Knussen, 66, British composer.
- Liu Tonghua, 88, Chinese pathologist, academician of the Chinese Academy of Engineering.
- Barry Mills, 70, American white supremacist and criminal, leader of the Aryan Brotherhood.
- Piratita Morgan, 49, Mexican professional wrestler.
- Frank Ramsey, 86, American Hall of Fame basketball player (Boston Celtics).
- Robert D. Ray, 89, American politician, Governor of Iowa (1969–1983), Mayor of Des Moines (1997), and President of Drake University (1998), Parkinson's disease.
- Saleem Shahzad, 62, Pakistani politician, MNA (1988–1992), lung cancer.
- Lonnie Shelton, 62, American basketball player (New York Knicks, Seattle SuperSonics, Cleveland Cavaliers), hypertension.
- Carlo Vanzina, 67, Italian film director (Nothing Underneath, Vacanze di Natale, Un'estate al mare), producer and screenwriter, melanoma.

=== 9 ===
- Kavi Kumar Azad, 45, Indian actor (Taarak Mehta Ka Ooltah Chashmah), heart attack.
- Barbara Carlson, 80, American politician and radio host (KSTP), Minneapolis City Council member (1981–1989), lung cancer.
- Peter Carington, 6th Baron Carrington, 99, British politician, Foreign Secretary (1979–1982), Secretary General of NATO (1984–1988).
- Sam Chisholm, 78, New Zealand-born Australian television executive (Nine Network, Sky UK).
- Stefan Demert, 78, Swedish musician.
- Sammy Esposito, 86, American baseball player (Chicago White Sox, Kansas City Athletics).
- Dominique Frelaut, 90, French politician, Deputy (1973–1986, 2001–2002), mayor of Colombes (1965–2001).
- William Hughes, 20, Welsh boxer and actor (Doctor Who), suicide.
- Melanie Kaye/Kantrowitz, 73, American poet and activist, Parkinson's disease.
- Johnny Moates, 73, American college basketball player (Richmond Spiders).
- Irmgard Oepen, 89, German physician.
- Larry Onesti, 79, American football player (Houston Oilers).
- Jenny Phillips, 76, American documentarian (The Dhamma Brothers) and therapist, drowned.
- Hans-Pavia Rosing, 70, Greenlandic politician.
- Finnbjörn Þorvaldsson, 94, Icelandic Olympic sprinter (1948), handball player and basketball player (Íþróttafélag Reykjavíkur).
- Michel Tromont, 81, Belgian politician, Deputy (1978–1983), Governor of Hainaut (1983–2004), Mayor of Quiévrain (1977–1983).
- Hans Günter Winkler, 91, German Hall of Fame show jumping rider, Olympic champion (1956).
- Marion Woodman, 89, Canadian author and psychologist.
- Queen Worlu, 58, Nigerian diplomat, Ambassador to São Tomé and Príncipe (since 2017).

=== 10 ===
- Joseph A. Ahearn, 81, American major general.
- Lolee Aries, 61, American television producer (The Simpsons, King of the Hill, Dora the Explorer).
- Kebede Balcha, 66, Ethiopian marathon runner, world championship silver medalist (1983).
- Robert Behringer, 69, American physicist.
- Alicia Bellán, 86, Argentine actress.
- Carlo Benetton, 74, Italian fashion executive, co-founder of Benetton Group, cancer.
- Haroon Bilour, 48, Pakistani politician, bombing.
- Nikolai Dementey, 88, Belarusian politician, Chairman of the Supreme Soviet of the Byelorussian Soviet Socialist Republic (1990–1991).
- William Hobbs, 79, British fencer and fight choreographer (Willow, Flash Gordon, Rob Roy), dementia.
- Edvin Hodžić, 23, Austrian footballer.
- Hu Sheng-cheng, 77, Taiwanese economist, pulmonary calcification.
- Ron Johnson, 62, American football player (Pittsburgh Steelers).
- Clive King, 94, English author (Stig of the Dump).
- John Laird, Baron Laird, 74, British politician, member of the House of Lords (since 1999).
- Jessica Mann, 80, British writer.
- Henry Morgenthau III, 101, American author and television producer.
- Jan Henry T. Olsen, 61, Norwegian politician, Minister of Fisheries (1992–1996), complications from Alzheimer's disease.
- Marlene Riding In Mameah, 85, American silversmith.
- Darryl Rogers, 83, American football coach (Michigan State Spartans, Arizona State Sun Devils, Detroit Lions).
- Karl Schmidt, 86, German footballer.
- Mien Schopman-Klaver, 107, Dutch Olympic athlete (1932).
- José María Setién, 90, Spanish Roman Catholic prelate, Bishop of San Sebastián (1979–2000), stroke.
- John A. Stormer, 90, American author.
- Andrei Suslin, 67, Russian mathematician, Cole Prize winner (2000).
- Tin Ka Ping, 98, Hong Kong entrepreneur and philanthropist.
- Ladislav Toman, 83, Czech volleyball player, Olympic silver medalist (1964).
- Ye Lwin, 70, Burmese guitarist and peace activist, liver cancer.

=== 11 ===
- Abdel Aziem Al-Afifi, 48, Egyptian-born Australian Islamic cleric and scholar, Grand Mufti of Australia (since 2018), cancer.
- Paco Costas, 86, Spanish automotive and road safety journalist (Televisión Española).
- Richard John Garcia, 71, American Roman Catholic prelate, Bishop of Monterey, California (since 2007), complications from Alzheimer's disease.
- Mario Gargano, 89, Italian politician, Deputy (1972–1983).
- Václav Glazar, 65, Czech actor, heart failure.
- Barbara Harrell-Bond, 86, American-born British refugee studies academic (University of Oxford).
- Abdelkhader Houamel, 81, Algerian painter.
- Augusto Ibáñez Guzmán, 60, Colombian lawyer, magistrate and academic, President of Supreme Court of Justice (2009–2012), cancer.
- Ji Chunhua, 56, Chinese actor and action choreographer.
- Mahendra Kaul, 95, Indian-born British television presenter.
- Laurie Kelly, 89, Australian politician, NSW MP for Corrimal (1968–1988), Speaker (1976–1988), pneumonia.
- Liu Zhenhua, 97, Chinese general and diplomat, ambassador to Albania (1971–1976).
- Rodolfo Lozano, 76, American judge (U.S. District Court for the Northern District of Indiana).
- Giovanni Marra, 87, Italian Roman Catholic prelate, Archbishop of Messina-Lipari-Santa Lucia del Mela (1997–2006).
- Vojtěch Mynář, 74, Czech politician, MEP (2012–2014).
- Tom Neil, 97, British fighter pilot (Battle of Britain), member of The Few.
- Nathaniel Reed, 84, American environmentalist and political aide (Claude R. Kirk Jr.), co-writer of the Endangered Species Act of 1973, head injury from fall.
- Lindy Remigino, 87, American sprinter, Olympic champion (1952), pancreatic cancer.
- Miriam Rossi, 81, American pediatrician.
- Mai Tai Sing, 94, American actress (Forbidden, Strange Portrait).
- Harold Sorgenti, 84, American businessman.
- Pat Swindall, 67, American politician, member of the U.S. House of Representatives from Georgia's 4th district (1985–1989).
- Wu Bing'an, 89, Chinese ethnologist, cancer.

=== 12 ===
- Jennie Alexander, 87, American author, complications from respiratory illness.
- Abbas Amir-Entezam, 86, Iranian politician and convicted spy, Deputy Prime Minister (1979).
- J. A. Bailey, 88, English cricket player and administrator, Secretary of Marylebone Cricket Club (1974–1987).
- Angela Bowen, 82, American academic and dance teacher.
- Len Chappell, 77, American basketball player (Philadelphia 76ers, New York Knicks, Milwaukee Bucks).
- Thomas F. Ellis, 97, American lawyer and political strategist (National Congressional Club).
- Alain Fauré, 55, French politician, Deputy (2012–2017), Mayor of Les Pujols (2001–2014).
- Gerardo Fernández Albor, 100, Spanish politician, President of Galicia (1982–1987).
- Ange-Marie Filippi-Codaccioni, French historian and politician.
- Alun Howkins, 70, English social historian.
- John Lankston, 84, American operatic tenor and actor.
- Bud Lathrop, 82, American basketball coach (Raytown South High School).
- Dora Luz, 100, Mexican singer.
- Dimitar Marashliev, 70, Bulgarian footballer (CSKA Sofia, national team).
- Joseph Henry Mensah, 89, Ghanaian politician and economist, MP (1969–1972, 1997–2009).
- Annabelle Neilson, 49, English socialite, fashion model, author, and television personality (Ladies of London), heart attack.
- Mauno Nurmi, 81, Finnish football and ice hockey player.
- Roger Perry, 85, American actor (Falcon Crest, Harrigan and Son, Arrest and Trial), prostate cancer.
- Del Shankel, 90, American microbiologist and academic administrator, Chancellor of University of Kansas (1980–1981, 1994–1995).
- Laura Soveral, 85, Angolan-born Portuguese actress.
- Joan Stafford-King-Harman, 100, British socialite and intelligence officer.
- Thomas Stephens, 82, American football player (Boston Patriots).
- Dada Vaswani, 99, Indian spiritual leader.
- José Omar Verdún, 73, Uruguayan footballer (Peñarol, Club Olimpia, Real Cartagena).
- Robert Wolders, 81, Dutch actor (Laredo).
- Fred van der Zwan, 82, Dutch Olympic water polo player (1960).

=== 13 ===
- Ponty Bone, 78, American accordionist, progressive supranuclear palsy.
- Peter Copeman, 86, English dermatologist.
- Grahame Dangerfield, 80, British broadcaster and naturalist.
- Stan Dragoti, 85, American film director (Mr. Mom, Necessary Roughness, Love at First Bite), complications from pneumonia.
- Ray Frenette, 83, Canadian politician, Premier of New Brunswick (1997–1998).
- Frank Giroud, 62, French comics writer.
- Jan Górny, 85, Polish Olympic field hockey player.
- Kenneth Grieb, 79, American political scientist.
- Naturalism, 29, New Zealand-born Australian racehorse.
- Atukwei Okai, 77, Ghanaian poet and academic (University of Ghana).
- Mary Olmsted, 98, American diplomat.
- Claudio Pieri, 77, Italian football referee.
- Siraj Raisani, 55, Pakistani politician, bombing.
- K. Rani, 75, Indian playback singer.
- Luc Rosenzweig, 74, French journalist and writer.
- Claude Seignolle, 101, French author.
- Thorvald Stoltenberg, 87, Norwegian politician, Minister of Defence (1979–1981), Minister of Foreign Affairs (1987–1989, 1990–1993).
- Jocelyn Vollmar, 92, American ballerina.

=== 14 ===
- Anthony Caesar, 94, English priest and composer.
- Mario Casalinuovo, 96, Italian politician, Deputy (1979–1987), Minister of Transports (1982–1983).
- Gordon Chong, 74, Canadian politician, Toronto City Councilor (1980–1982), Chairman of the Greater Toronto Services Board (2001).
- Harold Covington, 64, American political activist.
- Christa Dichgans, 78, German painter.
- Sir Alan Donald, 87, British diplomat, Ambassador to China (1988–1991), prostate cancer.
- Guido Elmi, 82, Italian Olympic swimmer.
- Claudia Griffith, 67, American politician, member of the Oklahoma House of Representatives (since 2015), heart attack.
- Theo-Ben Gurirab, 80, Namibian politician, Prime Minister (2002–2005), President of the UN General Assembly (1999–2000), Speaker of the National Assembly (2005–2015).
- Janet Holm, 94, New Zealand environmental activist and historian.
- Vidmantė Jasukaitytė, 70, Lithuanian writer.
- Hans Kronberger, 67, Austrian politician.
- Mick Langley, British snooker player, Paralympic champion (1988).
- Davie McParland, 83, Scottish football player and manager (Partick Thistle, Queen's Park, Hamilton).
- Chet Morgan, 81, American politician, member of the Connecticut House of Representatives (1977–1983).
- Pio Rapagnà, 73, Italian politician, Deputy (1992–1994), respiratory failure.
- Masa Saito, 76, Japanese professional wrestler (NWA, NJPW, WWF), Parkinson's disease.
- Thomas Stevens, 79, American trumpeter.
- Natalia Tanner, 96, American physician.
- Ron Thomas, 67, American basketball player (Louisville Cardinals, Kentucky Colonels).
- Juan María Uribezubia, 78, Spanish cyclist.
- Petr Weigl, 79, Czech director, playwright and dramaturge.

=== 15 ===
- Ronny Fredrik Ansnes, 29, Norwegian cross-country skier, drowned.
- Maj-Britt Bæhrendtz, 102, Swedish writer and radio host.
- Trevor Brewer, 87, Welsh rugby union player (Newport, London Welsh, national team).
- Olav Bucher-Johannessen, 91, Norwegian diplomat and politician.
- Dave Dave, 42, American conceptual artist, subject of David, complications from pneumonia.
- Theryl DeClouet, 66, American jazz-funk singer (Galactic).
- Ray Emery, 35, Canadian ice hockey player (Ottawa Senators, Philadelphia Flyers, Chicago Blackhawks), drowned.
- Roman Korynt, 88, Polish footballer.
- Stan Lewis, 91, American record label owner (Jewel Records).
- Dragutin Šurbek, 71, Croatian Olympic table tennis player (1992), world champion (1979, 1983).
- Leszek Tórz, 59, Polish Olympic field hockey player.

=== 16 ===
- Douglas Brewer, 93, Welsh experimental physicist.
- Václav Burda, 45, Czech ice hockey player (national team) and scout (Ottawa Senators, Edmonton Oilers), world championship bronze medalist (1998), traffic collision.
- Gabriel Caruana, 89, Maltese artist.
- Chow Kwai Lam, 75, Malaysian football player and manager (national team).
- Francis Farley, 97, British scientist.
- Bo Grahn, 70, Finnish Olympic shot putter (1972), melanoma.
- Jaime Guardia, 85, Peruvian charango player, composer and musicologist.
- Robin Jones, 64, American basketball player (Portland Trail Blazers, Houston Rockets, Olympique Antibes).
- Madeleine Kamman, 87, French chef and restaurateur.
- Marija Kohn, 83, Croatian actress.
- Christian Menn, 91, Swiss bridge architect.
- Jerzy Piskun, 80, Polish Olympic basketball player (1960, 1964).
- Gabriel Rivera, 57, American football player (Pittsburgh Steelers, Texas Tech Red Raiders).
- Evan Whitton, 90, Australian journalist (The Sydney Morning Herald), five-time Walkley Award winner.
- Manuel Ycaza, 80, Panamanian-born American jockey, Belmont Stakes winner (1964 with Quadrangle), pneumonia and sepsis.

=== 17 ===
- Arthur James Armstrong, 93, American Methodist bishop.
- Gary Beach, 70, American actor (The Producers, Beauty and the Beast, La Cage aux Folles), Tony winner (2001).
- Rita Bhaduri, 62, Indian actress.
- Yvonne Blake, 78, British-born Spanish costume designer (Superman, Nicholas and Alexandra, Jesus Christ Superstar), Oscar winner (1971), complications from a stroke.
- Lincoln Brower, 86, American entomologist (monarch butterfly) and academic.
- Murabit al-Hajj, 105, Mauritanian Islamic cleric and scholar.
- Mark Hayes, 69, American golfer, complications from Alzheimer's disease.
- Honour and Glory, 25, American racehorse, complications from a broken femur.
- Shirley J. Humphrey, 81, American politician.
- Bullumba Landestoy, 93, Dominican pianist and composer.
- Saait Magiet, 66, South African cricketer.
- Radoslav Nenadál, 88, Czech writer and English-language translator (Sophie's Choice).
- John Ovenden, 75, British politician, MP for Gravesend (1974–1979).
- Nancy M. Petry, 49, American psychologist, breast cancer.
- Kim Renders, 63, Canadian writer, director and actress.
- João Semedo, 67, Portuguese pulmonologist and politician, member of Assembly of Republic (2006–2015).
- David Stevens, 77, Palestinian-born Australian playwright (The Sum of Us) and screenwriter (Breaker Morant), cancer.
- Langton Tinago, 68, Zimbabwean boxer, dual Commonwealth lightweight champion (1980–1981, 1986–1987), Commonwealth super featherweight champion (1983–1984).
- Robert H. Traurig, 93, American lawyer, founder of Greenberg Traurig.
- Hugh Whitemore, 82, English playwright and screenwriter (The Gathering Storm, 84 Charing Cross Road, The Final Days).
- Yang Kuo-shu, 86, Taiwanese psychologist and activist, member of Academia Sinica, stroke.

=== 18 ===
- Carlos Aldunate Lyon, 102, Chilean Jesuit priest, master of novices (Pope Francis) and writer.
- Anne Olivier Bell, 102, English literary editor and art scholar, member of the Monuments Men Brigade.
- Adrian Cronauer, 79, American disc jockey (AFN), subject of Good Morning, Vietnam.
- John Banks Elliott, 101, Ghanaian diplomat, Ambassador to Soviet Union (1960–1966).
- Ronald H. Griffith, 82, American military officer, Vice Chief of Staff of the United States Army (1995–1997), heart attack.
- Aiko Herzig-Yoshinaga, 93, American political activist.
- A. I. Katsina-Alu, 76, Nigerian judge, Chief Justice (2009–2011).
- Ling Li, 76, Chinese historical novelist and missile engineering technologist.
- Czesław Malec, 77, Polish Olympic basketball player (1968).
- Mo Nunn, 79, English motor racing team owner (Ensign Racing).
- Pedro Pérez, 66, Cuban Olympic triple jumper (1972, 1976), Pan-American champion (1971).
- Burton Richter, 87, American physicist, Nobel Prize laureate (1976).
- Larry Robinson, 76, Canadian Hall of Fame football player (Calgary Stampeders).
- Mollie Tibbetts, 20, American student (University of Iowa), multiple sharp force injuries.
- Rob van Mesdag, 88, Dutch Olympic rower (1952), European championship bronze medalist (1955).
- Geoffrey Wellum, 96, British fighter pilot (Battle of Britain), member of The Few.

=== 19 ===
- Bruce Arnott, 79, South African sculptor.
- John H. Bunzel, 94, American academic.
- Jennifer Cassar, 66, Trinidadian indigenous leader (Santa Rosa First Peoples Community) and civil servant, Carib Queen (since 2011), complications following surgery.
- Ibrahim Coomassie, 76, Nigerian police officer, Inspector General of Police (1993–1999).
- Gustavo de Greiff, 89, Colombian lawyer, educator and activist, Attorney General (1992–1994).
- Shinobu Hashimoto, 100, Japanese screenwriter (Seven Samurai, Rashomon, I Live in Fear), pneumonia.
- Philip Holst-Cappelen, 53, Norwegian fraudster and kidnapper, starvation.
- Michael Howells, 61, British production designer (Victoria, Ever After, Nanny McPhee), heart condition stemming from Marfan syndrome.
- Rayo de Jalisco Sr., 85, Mexican professional wrestler (AAA).
- George D. LeMaitre, 84, American vascular surgeon.
- Gopaldas Neeraj, 93, Indian poet and writer, lung infection.
- Rebecca Posner, 88, British philologist.
- Ken Reed, 86, Australian rules footballer (Essendon).
- Jon Schnepp, 51, American animator, filmmaker and voice actor (Metalocalypse, Space Ghost Coast to Coast, The Death of "Superman Lives"), complications from a stroke.
- Denis Ten, 25, Kazakhstani figure skater, Olympic bronze medalist (2014), stabbed.
- Yale Udoff, 83, American screenwriter (Bad Timing, Third Degree Burn, Eve of Destruction), cardiac arrest as a result of COPD.
- John Vigilante, 33, American ice hockey player (Milwaukee Admirals, Syracuse Crunch, Plymouth Whalers).

=== 20 ===
- Derek Bond, 91, English Anglican bishop, Bishop of Bradwell (1976–1993).
- Wally Bullington, 87, American football player and coach.
- Michael Ellis, 77, American politician, member of the Wisconsin State Senate (1983–2015) and State Assembly (1970–1980).
- María Dolores Gispert Guart, 84, Spanish voice actress and director of dubbing.
- Macario Gómez Quibus, 92, Spanish film poster artist (Psycho, Some Like It Hot, The Ten Commandments).
- Jeff Hook, 89, Australian cartoonist and illustrator.
- Arvo Jantunen, 89, Finnish basketball player and coach.
- Charles Koen, 73, American civil rights activist.
- Irini Lambraki, 69, Greek politician, MP (1977–1989) and MEP (1994–1999).
- Michael Lapage, 94, British Olympic rower (1948).
- Princess Maria of Löwenstein-Wertheim-Rosenberg, 82, German-born Austrian royal.
- Mitsuo Matayoshi, 74, Japanese political activist.
- Yasuo Matsushita, 92, Japanese banker, Governor of the Bank of Japan (1994–1998).
- Shirley McLoughlin, 88, Canadian politician.
- Haydn Morgan, 81, Welsh rugby union player (national team).
- Martin O'Donoghue, 85, Irish politician, Minister of Economic Planning (1977–1979) and Education (1982), TD (1977–1982).
- Thaddeus Radzilowski, 80, American historian and author, co-founder of the Piast Institute.
- Meg Randall, 91, American actress (Undercover Maisie, Criss Cross, Ma and Pa Kettle Go to Town).
- Akhtar Raza Khan, 75, Indian Sunni Muslim scholar and mufti.
- Heinz Schilcher, 71, Austrian football player (Ajax, Paris, national team) and manager.
- Paula Mary Turnbull, 97, American sculptor.
- Peter van Geersdaele, 85, British conservator.
- Christoph Westerthaler, 53, Austrian football player (Linz, national team) and manager (SV Horn), heart attack.

=== 21 ===
- Allan Ball, 75, English footballer (Queen of the South).
- Peter Blake, 69, Scottish actor (Dear John).
- Garen Bloch, 39, South African Olympic track cyclist (2000), traffic collision.
- Alene Duerk, 98, American Navy admiral, director of the Navy Nurse Corps (1970–1975).
- Jonathan Gold, 57, American food critic (Los Angeles Times, LA Weekly, Gourmet), Pulitzer Prize winner (2007), pancreatic cancer.
- Pierre Jacob, 65, Canadian politician.
- Annie Ali Khan, 38, Pakistani model and journalist, suicide by carbon monoxide inhalation.
- Ryu Matsumoto, 67, Japanese politician, Minister of Environment (2010–2011), lung cancer.
- Don McCarthy, 63, British entrepreneur and philanthropist, chairman of House of Fraser (2006–2014), cancer.
- William McCrary, 88, American baseball player (Kansas City Monarchs).
- Joseph Oyanga, 82, Ugandan Roman Catholic prelate, Bishop of Lira (1989–2003).
- Don Sanders, 73, American singer-songwriter.
- Chris Svensson, 53, English-born American auto engineer, re-designer of Ford GT, brain cancer.
- Stavros Tsakyrakis, 67, Greek jurist and academic (Columbia University, Harvard University, National and Kapodistrian University of Athens), cancer.
- Elmarie Wendel, 89, American actress (3rd Rock from the Sun, The Lorax, George Lopez) and singer.
- Terry Windell, 61, American visual effects artist (Ghostbusters, E.T. the Extra-Terrestrial) and television director (Star Trek: Voyager).
- Jacques Wirtz, 93, Belgian landscape gardener.

=== 22 ===
- István Ács, 89, Hungarian politician, Chairman of the Council of Debrecen (1966–1989).
- Robert M. Blizzard, 94, American endocrinologist.
- Barney Coombs, 81, British religious leader.
- Manos Eleftheriou, 80, Greek poet, lyricist and writer, heart attack.
- Ikramullah Gandapur, Pakistani politician, Khyber Pakhtunkhwa Minister for Agriculture (2014–2018), bombing.
- Frank Havens, 93, American sprint canoeist, Olympic champion (1952).
- Raymond Hunthausen, 96, American Roman Catholic prelate, Bishop of Helena (1962–1975) and Archbishop of Seattle (1975–1991).
- June Jacobs, 88, British peace activist, stroke.
- Donald Kaul, 83, American journalist (The Des Moines Register), co-founder of RAGBRAI, prostate cancer.
- Brian Kellow, 59, American magazine editor (Opera News) and biographer, brain cancer.
- Fatima Abdel Mahmoud, 73, Sudanese politician.
- Hatidža Mehmedović, 64, Bosnian human rights activist, founder and leader of the Mothers of Srebrenica, breast cancer.
- Basabi Nandi, 82, Indian actress (Bon Palashir Padabali), heart attack.
- Rene Portland, 65, American college basketball coach (Penn State Lady Lions), cancer.
- Paul V. Priolo, 91, American politician.
- Bernardo Ribas Carli, 32, Brazilian politician, member of Legislative Assembly of Paraná (since 2011), plane accident.
- Egidius Schiffer, 62, German serial killer, electrocution. (body discovered on this date)
- Clemmie Spangler, 86, American banker, natural resource executive (National Gypsum) and academic administrator, President of the UNC (1986–1997).
- Tony Sparano, 56, American football coach (Dallas Cowboys, Oakland Raiders, Miami Dolphins), arteriosclerotic heart disease.
- Tor Erling Staff, 85, Norwegian lawyer.

=== 23 ===
- Maryon Pittman Allen, 92, American journalist and politician, U.S. Senator from Alabama (1978).
- Vitaliy Balytskyi, 39, Ukrainian football player and manager.
- Lucy Birley, 58, British model (Robert Mapplethorpe) and socialite, apparent suicide by gunshot.
- Julia Borisenko, 28, Belarusian footballer (Zvezda-BGU Minsk, Ryazan, national team), drowned.
- George Brown, 86, American Olympic long jumper (1952).
- Helen Burns, 101, English actress.
- Choe Inhun, 82, South Korean writer, colorectal cancer.
- Tony Cline, 69, American football player (Oakland Raiders, San Francisco 49ers, Miami Hurricanes).
- Jimmy Copeland, 76, Scottish footballer (Clyde, Kilmarnock).
- Howard Felsher, 90, American game show producer (Family Feud, Password, Tic-Tac-Dough).
- Doug Grindstaff, 87, American sound editor (Star Trek, Dallas, The Brady Bunch), five-time Emmy winner.
- Harry Gulkin, 90, Canadian film producer (Lies My Father Told Me, Two Solitudes, Bayo), pneumonia.
- Elbert Howard, 80, American civil rights activist, co-founder of the Black Panther Party.
- Stephen Juan, 69, American anthropologist and author.
- Barbara Kennedy, 58, American basketball player (Clemson Tigers).
- Vladimir Komarov, 69, Russian Olympic speed skater (1972) and sports official.
- Mary Jane McCaffree, 106, American secretary, White House Social Secretary (1955–1961).
- Helen MacLeod, 37, Scottish harpist, traffic collision.
- Paul Madeley, 73, English footballer (Leeds United, national team), Parkinson's disease.
- Carl Gregor Herzog zu Mecklenburg, 85, German royal and art historian.
- Pierre Pican, 83, French Roman Catholic prelate, Bishop of Bayeux (1988–2010).
- Roh Hoe-chan, 61, South Korean politician, member of the National Assembly (2004–2008, 2012–2013, since 2016), suicide by jumping.
- Khalid Salleh, 70, Malaysian actor, respiratory failure.
- Oksana Shachko, 31, Ukrainian artist and human rights activist, co-founder of Femen, suspected suicide by hanging.
- Chrysa Spiliotis, 62, Greek actress and playwright, wildfire.
- Jacob Tanzer, 83, American attorney, Associate Justice of the Oregon Supreme Court (1980–1982).
- Giuseppe Tonutti, 93, Italian politician, Senator (1976–1987).
- Steven Béla Várdy, 83, Hungarian historian.
- Elliot Vesell, 84, American pharmacologist.

=== 24 ===
- William P. Acker, 87, American major general.
- Masanao Aoki, 87, Japanese engineer and economist.
- Vincenzo Silvano Casulli, 73, Italian astronomer, discoverer of 194 minor planets and asteroids.
- Tony Cloninger, 77, American baseball player (Atlanta Braves, Cincinnati Reds) and coach (New York Yankees).
- Nuala Considine, 90, Irish crossword compiler.
- Fred Donaldson, 81, English footballer (Port Vale, Exeter City and Chester).
- Mary Ellis, 101, British WWII era transport pilot (RAF, ATA).
- Vaughn Eshelman, 49, American baseball player (Boston Red Sox), liver disease.
- Florindo Fabrizio, 73, American politician, member of the Pennsylvania House of Representatives (since 2003), cancer.
- Corinne Gallant, 96, Canadian feminist philosopher.
- Walter Hirrlinger, 92, German politician.
- Yosh Kuromiya, 95, American artist and landscape architect.
- Isidor Levin, 98, Latvian folklorist.
- Jack P. Lewis, 99, American Biblical scholar.
- J. D. Lynch, 70, American politician, President pro tempore of the Montana Senate (1991-1994)
- John Murray, 83, English cricketer (Middlesex, national team).
- Reginald Pickup, 88, English footballer (Stoke City F.C.).
- Delroy Scott, 71, Jamaican footballer (Atlanta Chiefs).
- Patrick Troy, 82, Australian town planner and academic.
- Murray Watson Jr., 86, American politician, member of the Texas Senate (1963–1973) and House of Representatives (1957–1963).
- Phail Wynn, 70, American educator and banker (SunTrust Banks), president of Durham Tech (1980–2007).

=== 25 ===
- Judith Appelbaum, 78, American editor, consultant and author, ovarian cancer.
- Vakhtang Balavadze, 90, Georgian freestyle wrestler, Olympic bronze medallist (1956), world champion (1954, 1957).
- Bob Brady, 86, Canadian football player (BC Lions, Toronto Argonauts).
- Nick Browne-Wilkinson, Baron Browne-Wilkinson, 88, British judge, Senior Lord of Appeal in Ordinary (1998–2000).
- Kalparanjan Chakma, 96, Bangladeshi politician.
- Frank Clarke, 84, American football player (Cleveland Browns, Dallas Cowboys) and sportscaster (CBS).
- Shelly Cohen, 84, American musician (The Tonight Show Starring Johnny Carson), pneumonia.
- Jimmy Collins, 80, Scottish footballer (Brighton & Hove Albion, Tottenham Hotspur).
- Guy Fallot, 91, French cellist.
- Luis Gneiting, 50, Paraguayan politician, Governor of Itapúa (2013–2017) and Minister of Agriculture and Livestock (since 2018), plane crash.
- Andrew Hopper, 69, British lawyer.
- Richard Jarecki, 86, German-born American physician and gambler, pneumonia.
- Carolyn Jones, 77, British actress (Crossroads).
- Delwin Jones, 94, American politician, member of the Texas House of Representatives (1964–1972, 1989–2011).
- Rick Littlewood, 77, New Zealand Olympic judoka (1972).
- Sergio Marchionne, 66, Italian-Canadian automotive executive (Fiat Chrysler Automobiles, Ferrari, Maserati), heart attack.
- Guy Molinari, 89, American politician, member of the U.S. House of Representatives for New York's 14th (1983–1989) and 17th districts (1981–1983) and State Assembly (1975–1980).
- Braham Murray, 75, English theatre director (Manchester Royal Exchange).
- Ricardo C. Puno, 95, Filipino lawyer and politician, Minister of Justice (1979–1984).
- Glen Roven, 60, American composer, conductor and producer.
- Anne-Marie Sandler, 92, Swiss-born British psychologist and psychoanalyst.
- Clara Sereni, 71, Italian author.
- Robert Ellis Smith, 77, American attorney, heart attack.
- Ellie Soutter, 18, British snowboarder (Team GB), suicide by hanging.
- György Szepesi, 96, Hungarian radio sportscaster and football executive, Executive Committee Chairman of FIFA (1982–1994).
- Rudi Thomaes, 65, Belgian businessman, CEO of the Federation of Belgian Enterprises.
- Líber Vespa, 46, Uruguayan football player (Rosario Central, national team) and coach (C.A. Cerro), aneurysm.
- Giancarlo Vitali, 88, Italian painter and engraver.
- Patrick Williams, 79, American composer (The Mary Tyler Moore Show, Breaking Away, Cry-Baby), cancer.

=== 26 ===
- Alfredo del Águila, 83, Mexican footballer (national team, Deportivo Toluca F.C., Club América).
- Simegnew Bekele, 53, Ethiopian engineer and public administrator, shot.
- Achille Boothman, 79, Irish hurler.
- Willie Brown, 76, American football player (Philadelphia Eagles, Los Angeles Rams, USC Trojans) and coach, cancer.
- Michel Butel, 77, French journalist.
- María Concepción César, 91, Argentine actress (Rosaura at 10 O'Clock, Savage Pampas), singer and dancer.
- Stanley Cole, 72, American water polo player, Olympic bronze medallist (1972).
- Adem Demaçi, 82, Kosovar political activist, President of Parliamentary Party of Kosovo (1996–1998).
- Pat de Groot, 88, English-born American painter, and illustrator
- Walter Fisher, 87, American communication theorist, complications from Alzheimer's disease.
- Bradley S. Greenberg, 83, American communication theorist, cancer.
- Giorgos Katsibardis, 79, Greek attorney, athlete and politician, founding member of PASOK and MP (1977–2000), drowned.
- John Kline, 87, American basketball player (Harlem Globetrotters).
- Aloyzas Kveinys, 56, Lithuanian chess grandmaster, heart attack.
- Robert Martin, 99, American fighter pilot (Tuskegee Airmen), pneumonia.
- Berit Nøkleby, 78, Norwegian historian.
- Bob Petrino Sr., 81, American football coach.
- Orlando Ramírez, 75, Chilean footballer (Universidad Católica, Palestino, national team).
- Gerald Russell, 90, British psychiatrist.
- Sha Yexin, 79, Chinese playwright.
- Mostafa Rashidi Suja, 68, Bangladeshi politician, MP for Khulna (1991–2006), kidney disease.
- Dick Tucker, 92, American football coach.
- Anne Vermeer, 101, Dutch politician, Member of the House of Representatives (1956–1963), Senator (1966–1987), Mayor of Amersfoort (1976–1982).
- Galen Wahlmeier, 84, American-born Canadian football player (Saskatchewan Roughriders) and politician, Mayor of Estevan.
- Alastair Yates, 66, British news anchor (BBC News, Sky News, About Anglia).
- Japanese convicted murderers from the Aum Shinrikyo cult, executed by hanging.
  - Kenichi Hirose, 54.
  - Kazuaki Okazaki, 57.

=== 27 ===
- Alan Bennion, 88, British actor (Doctor Who, Z Cars).
- T. H. P. Chentharasseri, 89, Indian historian.
- George Cunningham, 87, British politician, MP (1970–1983).
- Michael P. DeLong, 73, American Marine Corps lieutenant general, heart attack.
- Marco Aurelio Denegri, 80, Peruvian linguist, sexologist and television host, pulmonary fibrosis.
- Abubakar Habu Hashidu, 74, Nigerian politician, Governor of Gombe State (1999–2003).
- Bernard Hepton, 92, British actor (Colditz, I, Claudius, Secret Army).
- Nobe Kawano, 95, American baseball clubhouse manager (Los Angeles Dodgers).
- Leo E. Litwak, 94, American writer.
- Mateja Matejić, 94, Yugoslavian-born American writer.
- Bongani Mayosi, 51, South African cardiology professor (University of Cape Town), Order of Mapungubwe recipient (2009), suicide.
- Algimantas Nasvytis, 90, Lithuanian architect.
- Ousha the Poet, 98, Emirati poet.
- Vitaly Shentalinsky, 78, Russian writer.
- Yuri Shundrov, 62, Russian-Ukrainian ice hockey player (Sokil Kiev) and goaltending coach.
- Song Yuquan, 85, Chinese materials scientist, academician of the Chinese Academy of Sciences.
- Enrique Verástegui, 68, Peruvian poet, physicist and philosopher, heart attack.
- Vladimir Voinovich, 85, Russian writer.
- Geoff Whitty, 71, British educator (Institute of Education).

=== 28 ===
- Guillermo Bredeston, 84, Argentine actor (Pobres habrá siempre, The Dragonfly Is Not an Insect, Deliciously Amoral), stroke.
- John C. Buechner, 82, American university administrator and politician, member of the Colorado House of Representatives (1973–1975), President of University of Colorado (1995–2000).
- Bob Cleberg, 89, American racing driver.
- Christopher Gibbs, 79, British antiques dealer.
- Wanny van Gils, 59, Dutch footballer (Willem II, NAC Breda, K. Beringen F.C.).
- Olga Jackowska, 67, Polish rock singer (Maanam), ovarian cancer.
- Kalia Kulothungan, 40, Indian footballer (East Bengal, Bhawanipore), traffic collision.
- Bruce Lietzke, 67, American professional golfer, glioblastoma.
- Max Ritchie, 83, Australian footballer (North Melbourne).
- K. Shanmugaratnam, 97, Singaporean pathologist.
- Fernando Tirapu, 66, Spanish footballer (Athletic Bilbao, Osasuna, Valencia).
- Paul Walfish, 83, Canadian endocrinologist, blood cancer.

=== 29 ===
- Hans Kristian Amundsen, 58, Norwegian politician and newspaper editor (Nordlys), State Secretary in the Ministry of Fisheries and Coastal Affairs (since 2011).
- Alex Boyle, 88, Australian footballer (Carlton).
- Brickhouse Brown, 57, American professional wrestler (SCW, WCWA, USWA), prostate cancer.
- Umberto Calzolari, 80, Italian baseball player (Fortitudo Baseball Bologna, national team).
- Chow Yei-ching, 82, Hong Kong holding company executive, liver cancer.
- Ramapada Chowdhury, 95, Indian novelist and short story writer.
- Brian Christopher, 46, American professional wrestler (WWF, TNA, USWA), suicide by hanging.
- Michael Doman, 57, South African cricketer, complications from diabetes.
- Oliver Dragojević, 70, Croatian singer, lung cancer.
- Abbas Duzduzani, 76, Iranian politician, Chairman of City Council of Tehran (1999), MP (1984–1992), Minister of Culture (1980–1981).
- Yaakov Elman, 74, American Judaic scholar.
- Anba Epiphanius, 64, Egyptian Coptic prelate, Abbot of Monastery of Saint Macarius the Great (since 2013).
- Graham Finlay, 82, New Zealand Olympic boxer (1956).
- John Goodwin, 97, British theatre publicist, writer and editor.
- Arsene James, 73, Saint Lucian politician, Minister of Education and Culture (2006–2011).
- Per Johnsen, 91, Norwegian Olympic sprint canoer.
- Peter P. Klassen, 92, Soviet-born Paraguayan writer.
- Johnny Lewis, 78, American baseball player (New York Mets) and coach (St. Louis Cardinals).
- Lin Xiangdi, 84, Chinese optoelectronic engineer, President of Southwest University of Science and Technology (2000–2004).
- Ma Ju-feng, 63, Taiwanese actor (The Spirit of Love, Unique Flavor, Feng Shui Family), stroke.
- Sam Mehran, 31, American musician (Test Icicles), suicide.
- Fiachra Ó Ceallaigh, 84, Irish Roman Catholic prelate, Auxiliary Bishop of Dublin (1994–2009).
- António José Rafael, 92, Portuguese Roman Catholic prelate, Bishop of Bragança-Miranda (1979–2001).
- Vibeke Skofterud, 38, Norwegian cross-country skier, Olympic champion (2010), jetskiing accident.
- Tomasz Stańko, 76, Polish jazz trumpeter and composer, pneumonia as a complication of lung cancer.
- Ian Stanley, 69, Australian golfer, cancer.
- Nikolai Volkoff, 70, Yugoslav-born American Hall of Fame professional wrestler (WWF).
- Bryan Wagner, 75, American politician, member of the New Orleans City Council (1980–1986).
- Heinz Zünkler, 88, German Olympic rower.

=== 30 ===
- Ken Berkeley, 88, Australian Olympic sailor (1972).
- Ron Dellums, 82, American politician, member of the U.S. House of Representatives from California's 7th, 8th and 9th districts (1971–1998), Mayor of Oakland (2007–2011), prostate cancer.
- Fernando Henríquez, 62, Spanish Olympic sprint canoer.
- Andreas Kappes, 52, German Olympic cyclist (1984), anaphylactic shock.
- Khayyam Mirzazade, 82, Azerbaijani composer and academic.
- Carmen Guerrero Nakpil, 96, Filipino author and historian, Chair of the National Historical Commission (1968–1971), pneumonia.
- John Sankaramangalam, 84, Indian film director (Janmabhoomi).
- Michael A. Sheehan, 63, American author and government official, Coordinator for Counterterrorism (1999–2000), multiple myeloma.
- Gary Strickler, 77, American academic administrator.
- Robert Thunell, 67, American biogeochemist and oceanographer.
- Finn Tveter, 70, Norwegian jurist and rower, Olympic silver medalist (1976).
- Zhou Yaohe, 91, Chinese scientist.

=== 31 ===
- Walid al-Kubaisi, 60, Iraqi-born Norwegian writer.
- Rafael Amador, 58, Mexican football player (Pumas UNAM, national team) and coach (Pumas UNAM), cancer.
- Yoshio Anabuki, 85, Japanese baseball player and manager (Nankai Hawks), sepsis.
- Hélio Bicudo, 96, Brazilian politician, Deputy (1991–1999), Vice Mayor of São Paulo (2001–2005), stroke.
- Tony Bullimore, 79, British sailor and nightclub owner, stomach cancer.
- George Cowgill, 89, American anthropologist and archaeologist.
- Rolf Engen, 88, American businessman.
- Sir Alex Fergusson, 69, British politician, Presiding Officer of the Scottish Parliament (2007–2011).
- Michael Krop, 88, American school board member (Miami-Dade County Public Schools), heart disease.
- Jose Apolinario Lozada, 67, Filipino diplomat and politician, member of the House of Representatives (1998–2004), brain hemorrhage.
- Jovito Plameras Jr., 83, Filipino politician, Governor of Antique (1985–1998) and member of the House of Representatives (1998–2001).
- Daryl Robertson, 82, American baseball player (Chicago Cubs).
- Isamu Shibayama, 88, Peruvian-born American civil rights activist.
- Bassano Staffieri, 86, Italian Roman Catholic prelate, Bishop of Carpi (1989–1999) and La Spezia-Sarzana-Brugnato (1999–2008).
- Christopher Stensaker, 73, Norwegian politician, member of Storting (1997–2005).
- Su Hongxi, 103, Chinese surgeon.
- Teoh Seng Khoon, 99, Malaysian badminton player.
- Julia Weertman, 92, American materials scientist.
- Damian Worrad, 43, English cricketer, heart attack.
- Beatrice Wright, 100, American psychologist.
- Manfred Wuttich, 77, German footballer (Eintracht Braunschweig, VfL Wolfsburg), Parkinson's disease.
