= List of Yale Bulldogs men's ice hockey seasons =

This is a season-by-season list of records compiled by Yale in men's ice hockey. The Yale men's team is the oldest active ice hockey team in North America, predating all current professional and amateur clubs.

Yale University has won one NCAA championship in its history, coming in 2013.

== Season-by-season results ==
Note: GP = Games played, W = Wins, L = Losses, T = Ties

NCAA D-I Champions	NCAA Frozen Four	Conference regular season champions	Conference Division Champions	Conference Playoff Champions

Season	Conference	Regular Season (Note: Code explanation; GP—Games Played, W—Wins, L—Losses, T—Tied games, OTW—Overtime Wins, OTL—Overtime Loses, 3/SW—Win in 3 on 3 overtime or shootout, Pts—Points*)														Conference Tournament Results	National Tournament Results
Season	Conference	Conference									Overall					Conference Tournament Results	National Tournament Results
Season	Conference	GP	W	L	T	OTW	OTL	3/SW	Pts*	Finish	GP	W	L	T	%	Conference Tournament Results	National Tournament Results
No Coach (1895–1916)
1895–96	Independent	–	–	–	–	–	–	–	–	–	4	2	1	1	.625		
1896–97	Independent	–	–	–	–	–	–	–	–	–	9	2	6	1	.278		
1897–98	Independent	–	–	–	–	–	–	–	–	–	8	3	3	2	.500		
1898–99	Independent	–	–	–	–	–	–	–	–	–	6	6	0	0	1.000		Intercollegiate Champion
1899–1900	Independent	–	–	–	–	–	–	–	–	–	15	10	5	0	.667		Intercollegiate Champion
1900–01	Independent	–	–	–	–	–	–	–	–	–	13	5	7	1	.423		Intercollegiate Champion
1901–02	Independent	–	–	–	–	–	–	–	–	–	17	11	5	1	.676		Intercollegiate Champion
1902–03	Independent	–	–	–	–	–	–	–	–	–	17	4	12	1	.265		
1903–04	Independent	–	–	–	–	–	–	–	–	–	10	4	4	2	.500		
1904–05	Independent	–	–	–	–	–	–	–	–	–	9	5	4	0	.556		
1905–06	Independent	–	–	–	–	–	–	–	–	–	11	7	3	1	.682		
1906–07	Independent	–	–	–	–	–	–	–	–	–	9	3	6	0	.333		
1907–08	Independent	–	–	–	–	–	–	–	–	–	9	5	4	0	.556		Intercollegiate Champion
1908–09	Independent	–	–	–	–	–	–	–	–	–	13	4	8	1	.346		
1909–10	Independent	–	–	–	–	–	–	–	–	–	15	8	7	0	.533		
1910–11	Independent	–	–	–	–	–	–	–	–	–	16	6	10	0	.375		
1911–12	Independent	–	–	–	–	–	–	–	–	–	18	11	7	0	.611		
1912–13	Independent	–	–	–	–	–	–	–	–	–	10	3	7	0	.300		
1913–14	Independent	–	–	–	–	–	–	–	–	–	14	6	8	0	.429		
1914–15	Independent	–	–	–	–	–	–	–	–	–	15	9	6	0	.600		
1915–16	Independent	–	–	–	–	–	–	–	–	–	15	9	6	0	.600		
Fred Rocque (1916–1917)
1916–17	Independent	–	–	–	–	–	–	–	–	–	14	10	4	0	.714		
No Coach (1917–1919)
1917–18	Independent	–	–	–	–	–	–	–	–	–	1	1	0	0	1.000		
1918–19	Independent	–	–	–	–	–	–	–	–	–	2	1	1	0	.500		
Talbot Hunter (1919–1920)
1919–20	Independent	–	–	–	–	–	–	–	–	–	9	4	5	0	.444		
Francis Bangs (1920–1921)
1920–21	Independent	–	–	–	–	–	–	–	–	–	10	3	6	1	.350		
Clarence Wanamaker (1921–1928)
1921–22	Independent	–	–	–	–	–	–	–	–	–	19	9	10	0	.474		
1922–23	Independent	–	–	–	–	–	–	–	–	–	15	9	6	0	.600		
1923–24	Independent	–	–	–	–	–	–	–	–	–	23	18	4	1	.804		
1924–25	Independent	–	–	–	–	–	–	–	–	–	16	14	1	1	.906		
1925–26	Independent	–	–	–	–	–	–	–	–	–	14	4	9	1	.321		
1926–27	Independent	–	–	–	–	–	–	–	–	–	16	8	7	1	.531		
1927–28	Independent	–	–	–	–	–	–	–	–	–	18	14	4	0	.778		
Lawrence Noble (1928–1930)
1928–29	Independent	–	–	–	–	–	–	–	–	–	17	15	1	1	.912		
1929–30	Independent	–	–	–	–	–	–	–	–	–	19	17	1	1	.921		
Holcomb York (1930–1938)
1930–31	Independent	–	–	–	–	–	–	–	–	–	17	15	1	1	.912		
1931–32	Independent	–	–	–	–	–	–	–	–	–	20	11	7	2	.600		
1932–33	Independent	–	–	–	–	–	–	–	–	–	19	11	8	0	.579		
1933–34	Quadrangular League	6	4	2	0	–	–	–	.667	2nd	17	8	8	1	.500		
1934–35	Quadrangular League	6	5	1	0	–	–	–	.833	1st	21	14	7	0	.667		
1935–36	Quadrangular League	6	2	4	0	–	–	–	.333	4th	18	6	12	0	.333		
1936–37	Quadrangular League	6	2	4	0	–	–	–	.333	3rd	16	5	11	0	.313		
1937–38	Quadrangular League	6	2	4	0	–	–	–	.333	3rd	18	7	10	1	.417		
Murray Murdoch (1938–1965)
1938–39	Quadrangular League	6	0	5	1	–	–	–	.083	4th	20	9	10	1	.475		
1939–40	Quadrangular League	6	5	0	1	–	–	–	.917	1st	20	10	6	4	.600		
1940–41	Quadrangular League	6	4	1	1	–	–	–	.786	2nd	17	11	4	2	.706		
1941–42	Quadrangular League	6	3	3	0	–	–	–	.500	2nd	17	13	4	0	.765		
1942–43	Quadrangular League	6	3	3	0	–	–	–	.500	3rd	13	8	5	0	.615		
1943–44	Independent	–	–	–	–	–	–	–	–	–	5	3	2	0	.600		
1944–45	Independent	–	–	–	–	–	–	–	–	–	6	2	4	0	.333		
1945–46	Independent	–	–	–	–	–	–	–	–	–	8	6	2	0	.750		
1946–47	Pentagonal League	7	6	1	0	–	–	–	.857	2nd	22	15	6	1	.705	Lost Playoff, 2–5 (Dartmouth)	
1947–48	Pentagonal League	7	2	5	0	–	–	–	.286	T–4th	20	8	11	1	.425		
1948–49	Pentagonal League	8	2	6	0	–	–	–	.250	4th	22	9	13	0	.409		
1949–50	Pentagonal League	8	5	3	0	–	–	–	.625	2nd	18	12	6	0	.667		
1950–51	Pentagonal League	8	5	2	1	–	–	–	.688	2nd	17	14	2	1	.853		
1951–52	Pentagonal League	8	7	1	0	–	–	–	.875	1st	25	17	8	0	.680		Lost Semifinal, 3–4 (Colorado College); Won Consolation Game, 4–1 (St. Lawrence)
1952–53	Pentagonal League	8	5	3	0	–	–	–	.625	T–2nd	20	12	8	0	.600		
1953–54	Pentagonal League	8	3	2	3	–	–	–	.563	2nd	19	11	5	3	.658		
1954–55	Pentagonal League	8	1	6	1	–	–	–	.188	5th	22	8	12	2	.409		
1955–56	Ivy League	8	5	3	0	–	–	–	.625	–	18	9	9	0	.500		
1956–57	Ivy League	8	5	3	0	–	–	–	.625	–	25	10	15	0	.400		
1957–58	Ivy League	8	4	4	0	–	–	–	.500	–	22	8	12	2	.409		
1958–59	Ivy League	10	5	4	1	–	–	–	.550	–	21	11	9	1	.548		
1959–60	Ivy League	10	5	5	0	–	–	–	.500	–	25	10	15	0	.400		
1960–61	Ivy League	10	7	2	1	–	–	–	.750	–	25	12	12	1	.500		
1961–62	ECAC Hockey	21	7	14	0	–	–	–	.333	21st	24	8	16	0	.333		
1962–63	ECAC Hockey	20	11	9	0	–	–	–	.550	11th	22	12	9	1	.568		
1963–64	ECAC Hockey	20	4	16	0	–	–	–	.200	T–26th	22	4	18	0	.333		
University Division
1964–65	ECAC Hockey	20	8	12	0	–	–	–	.400	T–9th	23	11	12	0	.478		
Richard Gagliardi (1965–1972)
1965–66	ECAC Hockey	21	8	12	1	–	–	–	.405	10th	23	10	12	1	.457		
1966–67	ECAC Hockey	22	13	9	0	–	–	–	.591	5th	24	13	11	0	.542	Lost Quarterfinal, 2–4 (St. Lawrence)	
1967–68	ECAC Hockey	22	6	16	0	–	–	–	.273	13th	24	6	18	0	.250		
1968–69	ECAC Hockey	23	9	14	0	–	–	–	.391	11th	24	9	15	0	.375		
1969–70	ECAC Hockey	22	6	16	0	–	–	–	.273	12th	24	6	18	0	.250		
1970–71	ECAC Hockey	20	5	15	0	–	–	–	.250	14th	24	6	17	1	.271		
1971–72	ECAC Hockey	17	5	12	0	–	–	–	.294	13th	24	10	14	0	.417		
Paul Lufkin (1972–1976)
1972–73	ECAC Hockey	15	5	9	1	–	–	–	.367	13th	23	12	10	1	.543		
Division I
1973–74	ECAC Hockey	18	5	13	0	–	–	–	.278	15th	24	8	16	0	.333		
1974–75	ECAC Hockey	20	0	19	1	–	–	–	.025	17th	23	1	21	1	.065		
1975–76	ECAC Hockey	21	1	20	0	–	–	–	.048	17th	25	4	21	0	.160		
Tim Taylor (1976–1983)
1976–77	ECAC Hockey	23	5	17	1	–	–	–	.239	15th	25	6	18	1	.260		
1977–78	ECAC Hockey	26	12	13	1	–	–	–	.481	9th	26	12	13	1	.481		
1978–79	ECAC Hockey	22	12	9	1	–	–	–	.568	7th	27	13	12	2	.519	Lost Quarterfinal, 2–9 (New Hampshire)	
1979–80	ECAC Hockey	21	5	14	3	–	–	–	.295	15th	26	7	16	3	.327		
1980–81	ECAC Hockey	21	11	9	1	–	–	–	.548	9th	26	13	12	1	.519		
1981–82	ECAC Hockey	21	11	9	1	–	–	–	.548	9th	26	15	10	1	.596		
1982–83	ECAC Hockey	23	12	9	0	–	–	–	.571	8th	28	14	14	0	.500	Lost Quarterfinal series, 0–2 (Providence)	
Mike Gilligan (1983–1984)
1983–84	ECAC Hockey	21	10	10	1	–	–	–	.500	T–9th	26	12	13	1	.481		
Tim Taylor (1984–1993)
1984–85	ECAC Hockey	21	13	7	1	–	–	–	27	5th	31	19	11	1	.629	Lost Quarterfinal series, 0–2 (Cornell)	
1985–86	ECAC Hockey	21	15	6	0	–	–	–	30	2nd	30	20	10	0	.667	Won Quarterfinal series, 2–0 (St. Lawrence); Lost Semifinal, 2–3 (2OT) (Cornell); Lost Third-place game, 3–6 (Harvard)	
1986–87	ECAC Hockey	22	13	9	0	–	–	–	29	4th	30	15	12	3	.550	Won Quarterfinal series, 2–0 (Clarkson); Lost Semifinal, 0–7 (St. Lawrence); Tied Third-place game, 4–4 (OT) (Rensselaer)	
1987–88	ECAC Hockey	22	6	16	0	–	–	–	12	10th	26	6	20	0	.231		
1988–89	ECAC Hockey	22	10	12	0	–	–	–	20	7th	31	11	19	1	.371	Lost Quarterfinal series, 0–2 (St. Lawrence)	
1989–90	ECAC Hockey	22	6	15	1	–	–	–	13	10th	29	8	20	1	.293	Won First round, 5–1 (Princeton); Lost Quarterfinal series, 0–2 (Colgate)	
1990–91	ECAC Hockey	22	9	11	2	–	–	–	20	T–8th	29	11	16	2	.414	Won First round, 5–1 (Brown); Lost Quarterfinal series, 0–2 (Clarkson)	
1991–92	ECAC Hockey	22	11	4	7	–	–	–	29	4th	27	13	7	7	.611	Lost Quarterfinal, 1–3 (Cornell)	
1992–93	ECAC Hockey	22	12	7	3	–	–	–	27	5th	31	15	12	4	.548	Lost Quarterfinal series, 0–1–1 (Brown)	
Daniel Poliziani (1993–1994)
1993–94	ECAC Hockey	22	5	16	1	–	–	–	11	11th	27	5	21	1	.204		
Tim Taylor (1994–2006)
1994–95	ECAC Hockey	22	6	13	3	–	–	–	15	12th	28	8	17	3	.339		
1995–96	ECAC Hockey	22	4	17	1	–	–	–	9	12th	31	7	23	1	.242		
1996–97	ECAC Hockey	22	6	14	2	–	–	–	14	10th	32	10	19	3	.359	Won First round, 1–0 (Colgate); Lost Quarterfinal series, 0–2 (Clarkson)	
1997–98	ECAC Hockey	22	17	4	1	–	–	–	35	1st	35	23	9	3	.700	Won First round series, 1–0–2 (St. Lawrence); Lost Semifinal, 1–2 (Princeton); Lost Third Place 1–4 (Harvard)	Lost Regional Quarterfinal, 0–4 (Ohio State)
1998–99	ECAC Hockey	22	11	7	4	–	–	–	26	T–5th	31	13	14	4	.484	Lost First round series, 0–2 (Colgate)	
1999–2000	ECAC Hockey	21	6	11	4	–	–	–	16	9th	30	9	16	5	.383	Lost First round series, 0–2 (Colgate)	
2000–01	ECAC Hockey	22	10	11	1	–	–	–	21	8th	31	14	16	1	.468	Lost First round series, 0–2 (Harvard)	
2001–02	ECAC Hockey	22	9	11	2	–	–	–	20	T–9th	31	10	19	2	.355	Lost First round series, 0–2 (Cornell)	
2002–03	ECAC Hockey	22	13	9	0	–	–	–	26	T–3rd	32	18	14	0	.563	Lost Quarterfinal series, 1–2 (Brown)	
2003–04	ECAC Hockey	22	10	12	0	–	–	–	20	7th	31	12	19	0	.387	Lost First round series, 0–2 (St. Lawrence)	
2004–05	ECAC Hockey	22	3	18	1	–	–	–	7	12th	32	5	25	2	.188	Lost First round series, 0–2 (Dartmouth)	
2005–06	ECAC Hockey	22	6	14	2	–	–	–	14	11th	33	10	20	3	.348	Won First round series, 2–0 (Union); Lost Quarterfinal series 0–2 (Dartmouth)	
Keith Allain (2006–Present)
2006–07	ECAC Hockey	22	8	13	1	–	–	–	17	T–8th	31	11	17	3	.403	Lost First round series, 0–2 (Harvard)	
2007–08	ECAC Hockey	22	9	9	4	–	–	–	22	T–6th	34	16	14	4	.529	Won First round series, 2–0 (Rensselaer); Lost Quarterfinal series, 1–2 (Princeton)	
2008–09	ECAC Hockey	22	15	5	2	–	–	–	32	1st	34	24	8	2	.735	Won Quarterfinal series, 2–0 (Brown); Won Semifinal, 4–3 (St. Lawrence); Won Championship, 5–0 (Cornell)	Lost Regional semifinal, 1–4 (Vermont)
2009–10	ECAC Hockey	22	15	5	2	–	–	–	32	1st	34	21	10	3	.662	Lost Quarterfinal series, 1–2 (Brown)	Won Regional semifinal, 3–2 (North Dakota); Lost Regional Final, 7–9 (Boston College)
2010–11	ECAC Hockey	22	17	4	1	–	–	–	35	2nd	36	28	7	1	.792	Won Quarterfinal series, 2–1 (St. Lawrence); Won Semifinal, 4–0 (Colgate); Won Championship, 6–0 (Cornell)	Won Regional semifinal, 2–1 (OT) (Air Force); Lost Regional Final, 3–5 (Minnesota–Duluth)
2011–12	ECAC Hockey	22	10	10	2	–	–	–	22	T–6th	35	16	16	3	.500	Won First round series, 2–1 (Princeton); Lost Quarterfinal series, 1–2 (Harvard)	
2012–13	ECAC Hockey	22	12	9	1	–	–	–	25	3rd	37	22	12	3	.635	Won Quarterfinal series, 2–0 (St. Lawrence); Lost Semifinal, 0–5 (Union); Lost Third-place game, 0–3 (Quinnipiac)	Won Regional semifinal, 3–2 (OT) (Minnesota); Won Regional Final, 4–1 (North Dakota); Won National semifinal, 3–2 (OT) (Massachusetts–Lowell); Won National Championship, 4–0 (Quinnipiac)
2013–14	ECAC Hockey	22	10	8	4	–	–	–	24	T–5th	33	17	11	5	.591	Won First round series, 2–0 (Harvard); Lost Quarterfinal series, 0–2 (Quinnipiac)	
2014–15	ECAC Hockey	22	12	6	4	–	–	–	28	3rd	33	18	10	5	.621	Lost Quarterfinal series, 1–2 (Harvard)	Lost Regional semifinal, 2–3 (OT) (Boston University)
2015–16	ECAC Hockey	22	14	5	3	–	–	–	31	2nd	32	19	9	4	.656	Lost Quarterfinal series, 0–2 (Dartmouth)	Lost Regional semifinal, 2–3 (OT) (Massachusetts–Lowell)
2016–17	ECAC Hockey	22	7	11	4	–	–	–	18	8th	33	13	15	5	.470	Won First round series, 2–0 (Dartmouth); Lost Quarterfinal series, 0–2 (Harvard)	
2017–18	ECAC Hockey	22	10	11	1	–	–	–	21	8th	31	15	15	1	.500	Lost First round series, 0–2 (Quinnipiac)	
2018–19	ECAC Hockey	22	11	10	1	–	–	–	23	T–5th	33	15	15	3	.500	Won First round series, 2–0 (Rensselaer); Lost Quarterfinal series, 0–2 (Clarkson)	
2019–20	ECAC Hockey	22	10	10	2	–	–	–	22	6th	32	15	15	2	.500	Won First round series, 2–1 (Union); Withdrew from Tournament	
2020–21	ECAC Hockey	Season Cancelled															
2021–22	ECAC Hockey	22	7	14	1	3	1	1	21	T–11th	30	8	21	1	.283	Lost First round series, 0–2 (Colgate)	
2022–23	ECAC Hockey	22	6	14	2	0	1	1	22	10th	32	8	20	4	.313	Won First round, 4–1 (Rensselaer); Lost Quarterfinal series, 0–2 (Quinnipiac)	
2023–24	ECAC Hockey	22	7	13	2	1	2	1	25	T–9th	30	10	18	2	.367	Lost First round, 2–4 (St. Lawrence)	
2024–25	ECAC Hockey	22	5	14	3	1	1	1	19	11th	30	6	21	3	.250	Lost First round, 1–5 (Cornell)	
Totals											GP	W	L	T	%	Championships	
Regular Season											2715	1266	1296	153	.494	2 Quadrangular Championships, 1 Pentagonal Championship, 3 ECAC Championships	
Conference Post-season											111	38	68	5	.365	2 ECAC tournament championships	
NCAA Post-season											14	7	7	0	.500	8 NCAA Tournament appearances	
Regular Season and Post-season Record											2840	1311	1371	158	.489	1 National Championship	

* Winning percentage is used when conference schedules are unbalanced.
