= Sally Hadden =

American historian

- Education: University of North Carolina at Chapel Hill (BA); Harvard University (JD, PhD)
- Occupations: Legal historian; history professor
- Spouse: Robert F. Berkhofer III

Sally E. Hadden is an American legal historian and professor of history. She specializes in the histories of early America, slave law, and the American legal profession.

== Education and early career ==
The youngest of five children, Hadden became interested in legal history while studying as an undergraduate with historian William Leuchtenburg. She received her B.A. in History and Political Science from the University of North Carolina at Chapel Hill in 1984, and her J.D. in 1989 and History Ph.D. in 1993 from Harvard University, where her dissertation was advised by early American historian Bernard Bailyn.

== Academic career ==
Hadden is the author of Slave Patrols: Law and Violence in Virginia and the Carolinas, among other books. The Law and History Review described Slave Patrols as the "first full-length work" to thoroughly examine slave patrols' "origins, character, variations, demise, and legacy." Hadden's monograph was described in the Journal of Interdisciplinary History as "thoroughly researched," "remarkably complete," and "commendably cautious." Her work on the topic was later featured in The 1619 Project and the History Channel documentary Slave Catchers, Slave Resisters.

The author of over two dozen peer-reviewed articles and book chapters, Hadden has frequently collaborated with other prominent legal historians, including Maeva Marcus and Patti Minter. With Alfred Brophy she co-edited A Companion to American Legal History (Wiley Blackwell, 2013). She has also led a Colonial Society of Massachusetts initiative aimed at making formerly untranscribed and unpublished historic legal documents available to scholars. Hadden has served for decades on the Law and History Review editorial board, as well as on committees for the OAH, Southern Historical Association, Massachusetts Historical Society, and the ASLH, from whom she was the first woman to receive the Craig Joyce award.

Hadden has received grants and fellowships from the National Endowment for the Humanities, National Humanities Center, British Library, American Historical Association, McNeil Center for Early American Studies, Library Company of Philadelphia, the American Antiquarian Society, and other institutions. In 2010, Hadden became a professor of history at Western Michigan University. Prior to that time, she taught at Florida State University, University of Toledo, and Harvard University.

== Personal life ==
Hadden is married to medieval historian Robert F. Berkhofer III, son of American historian Robert F. Berkhofer. During the COVID-19 pandemic, she co-founded the Kalamazoo chapter of Feed the Fight Kalamazoo, an organization that provided meals to first responders.

== Selected Bibliography ==
- Signposts: New Directions in Southern Legal History (co-editor with Patricia Minter; University of Georgia Press, 2013)
- A Companion to American Legal History (Wiley Blackwell, 2013) (co-edited with Alfred Brophy)
- Traveling the Beaten Path: Charles Tait's Charges to Federal Grand Juries, 1822-1825 (University of Alabama School of Law/University of Alabama Press, 2013) (co-authored with David Durham and Paul Pruitt)
- “Biography and Bernard Bailyn: The Ordeal of Thomas Hutchinson and the ‘Logical Obligation’ of Historical Research.” New England Quarterly XCV no.3 (2022): 401-33
- "The Fragmented Laws of Slavery in the Colonial and Revolutionary Eras". The Cambridge History of Law in America, edited by Christopher Tomlins and Michael Grossberg, 3 volumes (Cambridge University Press, 2008), 1: 253-87, 646-57.
- "London's Middle Temple and Law Students from the New World". English Law, the Legal Profession, and Colonialism: Histories, Parallels, and Influences, edited by Cerian Griffiths and Łukasz Korporowicz (Routledge, 2023), 40-59.
- "Gun Laws in Early America: The Sometimes Contradictory Regulations of Gun Use in the Colonial South". Joseph Blocher, Jacob D. Charles, and Darrell Miller, eds., New Histories of Gun Rights and Regulation: Essays on the Place of Guns in American Law and Society (Oxford University Press, 2023), 77-96.
- "Biography and Bernard Bailyn: The Ordeal of Thomas Hutchinson and the 'Logical Obligation' of Historical Research". New England Quarterly XCV no.3 (2022): 401-433.
- “Police and Slave Patrols: A History of State-Sponsored White-On-Black Violence.” In The Ethics of Policing: New Perspectives on Law Enforcement, edited by Benjamin Jones and Eduardo Mendieta (New York University Press, 2021), 205-221.
- "Race, Power, and the Law: Southern Law and Constitutional History". Co-authored with Charles Zelden. Reinterpreting Southern Histories: Essays in Historiography, edited by Craig Friend and Lorri Glover (Louisiana State University Press, 2020), 470-91.
- "Sklavenpatrouillen und die Polizei: Eine verwobene Geschichte der Rassenkontrolle" ("Slave Patrols and Police: An Intertwined History of Racial Control"). In Kritik der Polizei, edited by Daniel Loïck (Campus Verlag, Frankfurt Germany, 2018), 77-94.
- "Magna Carta for the Masses: An Analysis of Eighteenth-century Americans' Growing Familiarity with the Great Charter in Newspapers". North Carolina Law Review 94 (June 2016): 1681-1724.
- "A Legal Tourist Visits Eighteenth-Century Britain: Henry Marchant's Observations on British Courts, 1771-1772". Co-authored with Patricia Minter. Law and History Review 29 (2011): 133-179.
- "Honor, Law, and Identity: The Troubled Nature of Antebellum Slave Trials in the Deep South". Reviews in American History 29 (2001): 538-545.
- "Judging Slavery: Thomas Ruffin and State v. Mann". Local Matters: Race, Crime, and Justice in the Nineteenth-Century South, edited by Donald Nieman and Chris Waldrep (University of Georgia Press, 2001), 1-28.
