= Cynthia Nicoletti =

American legal historian

- Awards: William Nelson Cromwell Prize or the best dissertation in legal history (2011); Cromwell Book Prize (2018)

Academic background
- Education: University of Virginia (B.A., 1999), (M.A., 2004), (Ph.D., 2010); Harvard Law School (J.D., 2003)
- Thesis: The great question of the War: the legal status of secession in the aftermath of the American Civil War, 1865-1869 (2010)

Cynthia Lisa Nicoletti is an American legal historian. She is a professor of law at Duke University School of Law.

== Early life and education ==
Nicoletti earned her Bachelor of Arts degree, Master's degree, and PhD from the University of Virginia. Her dissertation, which examined the issue of whether secession could have been legally valid, earned the 2011 American Society for Legal History's William Nelson Cromwell Prize.

== Career ==
After serving as an instructor at the University of Virginia School of Law, Nicoletti accepted an assistant professor of law position at the Mississippi College School of Law in 2010. She returned to the University of Virginia School of Law in 2014 upon accepting an associate professor of law position. In this role, she earned a William Nelson Cromwell Foundation Research Fellowship for her work on the legal history of secession. In 2017, Nicoletti published her first book, Secession on Trial: The Treason Prosecution of Jefferson Davis, which won the Cromwell Book Prize. The book explores why Jefferson Davis was never tried for treason after the American Civil War.

During the COVID-19 pandemic in North America, Nicoletti's work was further recognized with the Supreme Court Historical Society's Hughes-Gossett Award for Best Journal Article for "Chief Justice Salmon P. Chase and the Permanency of the Union." She also received the school's Student Council Distinguished Teaching Award for having "a positive and lasting impact on the University by developing relationships with students through the creation of an engaging and challenging classroom atmosphere."

In July 2026, Nicoletti joined the faculty at Duke University School of Law.

== Selected publications ==
- Secession on Trial: The Treason Prosecution of Jefferson Davis, New York: Cambridge University Press, 2017. Book review
- "Chief Justice Salmon P. Chase and the Permanency of the Union". Journal of Supreme Court History, vol. 44, no. 2, pp. 154-169 (2019).
- "The Rise and Fall of Transcendent Constitutionalism in the Civil War Era". Virginia Law Review, vol. 106, issue 8, pp. 1631-1702 (December 1, 2020)
- "Strategic Litigation and the Death of Reconstruction". Hadden, Sally E. and Minter, Patricia Hagler, eds. Signposts: New Directions in Southern Legal History. University of George Press, 2013.
