= Shentalinsky =

Shentalinsky may refer to:

== People ==
- Vitaly Shentalinsky, Russian writer and journalist

== Places ==
- Shentalinsky District, Samara Oblast, Russia
