= Nancy Petry =

Nancy Petry may refer to:

- Nancy Petry (artist) (1931–2024), Canadian artist
- Nancy M. Petry (1968–2018), American psychologist
