= Slave Patrols: Law and Violence in Virginia and the Carolinas =

Slave Patrols is a 2001 nonfiction book by historian Sally E. Hadden

- Author: Sally E. Hadden
- Language: English
- Genre: Non-fiction
- Publisher: Harvard University Press
- Publication date: 2001
- Publication place: Cambridge, MA
- Pages: 340
- ISBN: 0674004701
- OCLC: 44860794
- Followed by: Signposts: new directions in Southern legal history

Slave Patrols: Law and Violence in Virginia and the Carolinas is a 2001 non-fiction book published by Harvard University Press by historian Sally E. Hadden. Hadden investigates the origins of slave patrols, that often enforced laws involving slaves, in the late seventeenth century in the American states of Virginia, North Carolina and South Carolina and the role these patrols had on the Ku Klux Klan after the American Civil War (1861 – 1865), an internal war following the secession of the Confederate States of America, which intended to uphold the enslavement of black people.

== Themes ==
"The history of police work in the South grows out of this early fascination, by white patrollers, with what African American slaves were doing. Most law enforcement was, by definition, white patrolmen watching, catching, or beating black slaves."

— Hadden 2001. p.i

In Slave Patrols Associate Professor of History at Western Michigan University Sally E. Hadden traces the origins of slave patrols in the American states of Virginia, North Carolina and South Carolina in the late 17th century. Slave patrols, "often mounted and armed with whips and guns" were formed by country courts and state militias and composed of poor whites as well as "respectable" members of society, to enforce state-level government of slaves in the southern States. Entire regions across the south—not just plantations—became armed camps, with patrollers, under the authority of local councils "using "terror and brutality". Hadden traces links between the legal slave patrols before the Civil War and "extralegal terrorization tactics used by vigilante groups during Reconstruction, most notoriously, the Ku Klux Klan." The Ku Klux Klan adopted slave patroller tactics, such as, "nightriding, citizen surveillance, and racial violence."

== Reviews ==
A Review in the Journal of Interdisciplinary History, described the book as " excellent beginning", "thoroughly researched", "remarkably complete", and "commendably cautious".

A 2004 review in the Law and History Review journal said that prior to the publication of Slave patrols, historians had only given "cursory attention to the enforcement of slave law". The article described Slave Patrols as the "first full-length work" that thoroughly examines slave patrols' "origins, character, variations, demise, and legacy."

A 2002 H-Net review said that Slave patrols was "well-written" and "thoroughly researched" and that is an "important contribution" to a "little-studied aspect of southern history." It was a combination of "legal and social history" to examine issues related to slave patrols in the "three eastern seaboard states that had the longest tradition of employing slave patrols".

Jeffrey Rogers Hummel, who wrote Emancipating Slaves, Enslaving Free Men: A History of the American Civil War , said that Hadden has "finally lifted" the institution of slave patrols from "obscurity and misconception" and that her book is a "must reading for anyone studying the history of American slavery, the Old South, or U.S. law enforcement".

== See also ==
- Reverse Underground Railroad
- Slave catcher
- Underground Railroad
- Law enforcement in the United States
