= Pio Rapagnà =

Italian politician (1945–2018)

Pio Rapagnà (24 September 1945 – 14 July 2018) was an Italian politician.

A native of Roseto degli Abruzzi, Rapagnà was a member of the Radical Party, which he represented in the Chamber of Deputies from 1992 to 1994. He was known for wearing a red scarf during public appearances and throughout parliamentary meetings.

Rapagnà was diagnosed with stomach cancer, for which he sought treatment at a hospital in Giulianova on 20 May 2018. He died on 14 July 2018 of respiratory failure. Rapagnà was married to Giovanna, with whom he had a daughter, Annalisa.
