= Edvin Hodžić =

Austrian footballer (1994–2018)

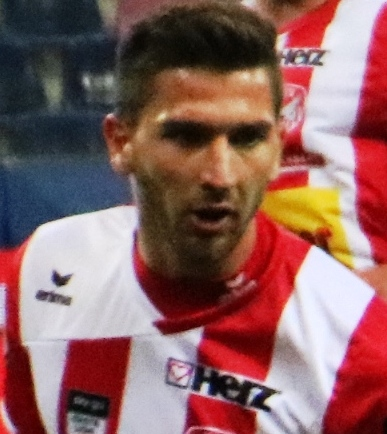
- Hodžić in April 2017.

Personal information
- Date of birth: 29 November 1994
- Date of death: 10 July 2018 (aged 23)
- Height: 1.88 m (6 ft 2 in)
- Position: Midfielder

Youth career
- 2002–2010: LASK Linz

Senior career*
Years	Team	Apps	(Gls)
2010–2012	FC Pasching	28	(0)
2012–2013	SV Wallern	20	(0)
2013–2014	SC Ritzing	21	(0)
2015–2017	ATSV Stadl-Paura	28	(3)
2016–2017	→ Austria Klagenfurt (loan)	14	(1)
2017	Kapfenberger SV	12	(0)
2017–2018	ATSV Stadl-Paura	9	(0)
2018	SV Schalding-Heining	0	(0)
Total		132	(4)
- * Club domestic league appearances and goals

Edvin Hodžić (29 November 1994 – 10 July 2018) was an Austrian professional footballer who played as a midfielder.

== Career ==
Hodžić played at youth level for LASK Linz from 2002 to 2010. He then played for various clubs in Austria - FC Pasching, SV Wallern, SC Ritzing, ATSV Stadl-Paura, Austria Klagenfurt and Kapfenberger SV. At the time of his death he had been contracted to German club SV Schalding-Heining for five weeks.

== Death ==
Hodžić died on 10 July 2018, at the age of 23. At the time of his death he was contracted to German club SV Schalding-Heining, and had played in a friendly game for the team two days before his death. The new season was due to start a few days after his death, but was cancelled.
