= María Dolores Gispert Guart =

Spanish actress

- Born: 22 March 1934; Barcelona, Spain
- Died: 20 July 2018 (aged 84); Barcelona, Spain
- Occupation: Actress

María Dolores Gispert Guart (22 March 1934 – 20 July 2018) was a Spanish actress, director and radio personality, known for being the Spanish voice of Whoopi Goldberg and Pippi Longstocking.

== Biography ==
She came from a family of artists on her mother's side: her grandparents, Carlos Guart and Carmen Martínez-Illescas, and her mother Enriqueta Guart Martínez-Illescas were theater actors. With her mother she worked on the work Don Juan Tenorio, in 1972.

She began her radio career as an announcer at "Radio Barcelona". In the mid-1940s she started working on film dubbing.

In the 1970s, she was the voice of Pippi Longstocking. In the 1980s, she voiced Sarah Douglas in the V series, and in the 1990s, she doubled the character of Estelle in the series Friends.

She was famous for lending her voice to a number of Hollywood actresses: Whoopi Goldberg, in fifty-one of her films; Kathy Bates, in five movies; Carole Lombard, Darlene Love, and Joanna Cassidy among others.

She was also dubbing director in The Color Purple and Schindler's List.

== Filmography and animated series ==
- Treasure Island (1950 film)
- The Night of the Hunter (film)
- I Confess (film)
- Irma la Douce
- Bonnie and Clyde (film)
- A Lizard in a Woman's Skin
- Shima Shima Tora no Shimajiro
- Play It Again, Sam (film)
- Grease (film)
- Blade Runner
- The Goonies
- The Color Purple (film)
- Titanic (1997 film)
- Ghost (1990 film)
- Charlotte's Web (2006 film)
- The Lion King
- Sister Act
