= Shelly Cohen =

Shelly Cohen (November 8, 1933 – July 25, 2018) was an American musician, musical director, choir director, conductor and two-time Grammy nominee. Alongside host Johnny Carson and announcer Ed McMahon, Cohen is believed to be the only person to have worked on the Tonight Show for Carson's entire run.

Cohen was born in Brooklyn, and played both the clarinet and violin as a child. After a tour of duty in the army during the Korean War, Cohen attended Juilliard School of Music while working a job in the NBC mailroom. Bandleader Skitch Henderson helped Cohen secure a position in the NBC music library, and upon its premiere, on the Tonight Show with Johnny Carson. Cohen served as assistant musical director throughout Carson's entire run on the Tonight Show, assisting Henderson, Milton DeLugg, Doc Severinsen and Tommy Newsom.

Cohen's additional musical endeavors include Christmas specials for NBC, the Emmy Awards, a year working for Dick Cavett, founding of the New Horizon Singers and the Pacific Pops Orchestra, and choir direction at St. Mel's Church in Woodland Hills.
