= Richard Cobb-Stevens =

American philosopher

Richard Cobb-Stevens (born 13 March 1935 in Cambridge, MA., USA; died on 6 July 2018, Carlisle, MA) was an American philosopher and Professor Emeritus at Boston College.

An expert in American pragmatism, continental philosophy, and phenomenology, especially Edmund Husserl and the philosophy of mathematics, Cobb-Stevens was author of three books including James and Husserl and Husserl and Analytic Philosophy.

He received his A.B. from Boston College in 1958, his Th.L from Université catholique de Louvain in 1966, and his Ph.D. from the University of Paris in 1971. Cobb-Stevens later served as Department Chair of the Philosophy Department at Boston College. At the time of his death he was Emeritus Professor of Philosophy at Boston College.

The festschrift Phenomenology in a New Key: Between Analysis and History: Essays in Honor of Richard Cobb-Stevens was published by Springer in 2015.
