= Augusto Ibáñez Guzmán =

Colombian lawyer (1958–2018)

President of the Supreme Court of Justice of Colombia
- In office 2009–2012

Personal details
- Born: 1958 Tunja, Colombia
- Died: 11 July 2018 (aged 59–60) Bogotá, Colombia
- Education: Universidad Externado de Colombia
- Occupation: Lawyer, academic
- Known for: President of the Supreme Court of Justice of Colombia (2009–2012)

Augusto Ibáñez Guzmán (1958 – 11 July 2018) was a Colombian lawyer and academic. He was the President of the Supreme Court of Justice of Colombia from 2009–2012.

== Early life ==
Ibáñez was born in Tunja, capital of the Colombian department of Boyacá, in 1958. His father, Joaquín T. Ibáñez Alarcón, was a surgeon and his mother, Elvira Guzmán de Ibáñez, was a senior nurse. He was the youngest of four brothers.

== Career ==
Ibáñez studied law at the Universidad Externado de Colombia, and was a founder of the University's Centre for Jurisprudence Studies. He worked as a specialist in criminal law at the University of Salamanca in Spain, and the Universidad Externado de Colombia in Bogotá. Ibáñez also worked as a minister in the International Criminal Court from 1999–2001, during which time he signed the Rome Statute of the International Criminal Court. As a judge, Ibáñez worked for the Superior Court of Bogotá from 2007–2012, where he was President from 2009–2012. Whilst President of the Supreme Court, he distanced himself from then Colombian president Álvaro Uribe. Days after bring appointed as President of the Supreme Court, Ibáñez complained to Uribe about the Administrative Department of Security's illegal interference with the Supreme Court. Ibáñez was also an advisor to the House of Representatives. He was the judge that convicted members of the Army after the 1996 La Gabarra massacre.

In 2008, Ibáñez claimed that a dozen armed men stormed his house to steal his personal computer, as it contained important information relating to his work. In 2010, he asked for government protection after being threatened. In 2017, Ibáñez received a PhD from Alfonso X El Sabio University. His thesis was on peace agreements.

== Death ==
In 2016, Ibáñez was diagnosed with liver cancer. He died on 11 July 2018 in a hospital in Bogotá, and his funeral was held in the Cristo Rey parish in Bogotá.
