= Richard Gagliardi =

American ice hockey player and coach (1933–2018)

Biographical details
- Born: September 20, 1933; Hamden, Connecticut, U.S.
- Died: July 2, 2018 (aged 84); Branford, Connecticut, U.S.

Playing career
- 1953–1956: Boston College
- Position: Defenseman

Coaching career (HC unless noted)
- 1960–1965: Yale (freshman)
- 1965–1972: Yale

Head coaching record
- Overall: 60–105–2

Richard A. Gagliardi, Sr. (September 20, 1933 – July 2, 2018) was an American ice hockey player and coach. He was the head coach of both Yale's freshman and varsity teams in the 1960s and early-1970s, finally retiring as a coach in 2005.

== Career ==
Gagliardi broke into the college game with Boston College in 1953–54, helping the Eagles to reach two NCAA Tournaments in three years. Gagliardi also played end for the football team that went 18–6–2 during his tenure but failed to reach a bowl game. After graduating Gagliardi spent two years serving in the marines as both a rifle platoon trainer and football player.

In 1960 Gagliardi was named as the head coach for the freshman ice hockey team at Yale remaining in that position until Murray Murdoch's retirement in 1965, allowing Gagliardi to become the varsity coach. The Bulldogs played well under their new boss for the first two years, reaching the conference tournament in the second season, but afterwards the team slipped in the standings and could only manage single-digit wins for four consecutive campaigns. The club began to show some improvement in 1971–72 with a 10-win season, but Gagliardi stepped down after the year, turning the team over to fellow BC alum Paul Lufkin.

Gagliardi continued to coach but he would do so at the high school level while he was not teaching math. Gagliardi would wrap up a 47-year career as a coach in the spring of 2005, last serving at Sacred Heart Academy-Hamden.

== Head coaching record ==
Record table
Season	Team	Overall	Conference	Standing	Postseason
Yale Bulldogs (ECAC Hockey) (1965–1972)
1965-66	Yale	10-12-1	8-12-0	10th	
1966-67	Yale	13-11-0	13-9-0	5th	ECAC Quarterfinals
1967-68	Yale	6-18-0	6-16-0	13th	
1968-69	Yale	9-15-0	9-14-0	11th	
1969-70	Yale	6-18-0	6-16-0	12th	
1970-71	Yale	6-17-1	5-15-0	14th	
1971-72	Yale	10-14-0	5-12-0	13th	
Yale:		60-105-2	52-94-0		
Total:		60-105-2			
National champion Postseason invitational champion Conference regular season champion Conference regular season and conference tournament champion Division regular season champion Division regular season and conference tournament champion Conference tournament champion
