= Michael Doman =

South African cricketer (1961–2018)

Personal information
- Born: 25 January 1961
- Died: 29 July 2018 (aged 57)
- Source: Cricinfo, 30 July 2018

Michael Doman (25 January 1961 – 29 July 2018) was a South African cricketer. He played fourteen first-class cricket matches for Transvaal and Western Province between 1977 and 1983.
