= Paul Walfish =

Canadian endocrinologist

Paul Gerald Walfish
- Education: University of Toronto
- Awards: CM, O.Ont
- Scientific career
- Fields: Endocrinology
- Workplaces: Mount Sinai Hospital

Paul Gerald Walfish, CM OOnt was a Canadian endocrinologist "whose research in the area of thyroid physiology and pathology has contributed to improved health care in Canada, especially for newborn infants".

Born in Toronto, Ontario, Walfish graduated from the University of Toronto in 1958 and specialized in internal medicine. After receiving a McLaughlin Foundation Fellowship, he spent a year studying endocrinology at Harvard Medical School. He joined the University of Toronto's Department of Medicine as a teacher, becoming a professor in 1982.

Walfish has worked at Mount Sinai Hospital since 1964 as a scientist and a clinician. He helped pioneer techniques of early thyroid cancer detection using fine-needle biopsies and ultrasounds.

Walfish died from leukemia on 28 July 2018, aged 83.

== Honours ==
In 1990, Walfish was made a Member of the Order of Canada. In 2007, he was made a Member of the Order of Ontario in recognition for being a "leader in the international thyroidology community".

In 1983, he received an Award of Merit from the City of Toronto. In 1987, he was made a Fellow of the Endocrine Section, the Royal Society of Medicine, England. He was awarded the 125th Anniversary of the Confederation of Canada Medal and the Queen Elizabeth II Golden Jubilee Medal. In 2004, he was the first Canadian to receive the American Thyroid Association's Paul Starr Award for outstanding contributions in clinical thyroidology. In 2007, he was awarded the Canadian Medical Association's Medal of Service "for advancing the art and science of treating thyroid diseases worldwide and raising the standards of medical practice in Canada".
