= Giuseppe Tonutti =

Italian politician (1925–2018)

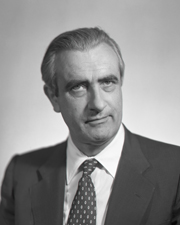

Senator of the Italian Republic
- In office 20 June 1979 – 1 July 1987
- Constituency: Friuli-Venezia Giulia

Personal details
- Born: 19 March 1925 Udine, Italy
- Died: 22 July 2018 (aged 93) Fagagna, Italy
- Party: Christian Democrat
- Profession: Company Manager

Giuseppe Tonutti (19 March 1925 – 23 July 2018) was an Italian politician who served as a Senator from 1976 to 1987. He was member of the Christian Democracy.

== Biography ==
Tonutti was born in Udine, Italy on 19 March 1925. Tonutti was elected to the Italian Senate as a member of the Christian Democrats in 1979 and stayed in office for 3 legislatures, until 1987.

Outside of politics, Tonutti worked in the business world, serving at one point as president of the Savings Bank of Friuli Venezia Giulia. Tonutti died in Fagagna, Italy on 22 July 2018.
