= Ange-Marie Filippi-Codaccioni =

French historian and Communist politician

- Born: 1925
- Died: July 12, 2018 (aged 92–93); Ajaccio, Corsica, France
- Education: University of Algiers; Sorbonne University
- Occupations: Historian, politician
- Political party: French Communist Party

Ange-Marie Filippi-Codaccioni (1925 - July 12, 2018) was a French historian and Communist politician. He was the author of several history books, and the deputy mayor of Aulnay-sous-Bois from 1971 to 1977.

== Early life ==
Filippi-Codaccioni was born in 1925. His parents were schoolteachers.

Filippi-Codaccioni graduated from the University of Algiers, where he earned a bachelor's degree in 1948. He studied at the Sorbonne and earned the CAPES, followed by the agrégation in History.

== Career ==
Filippi-Codaccioni began his career as a teaching assistant at the Lycée Carnot in Paris. He taught History in Saint-Omer from 1953 to 1957, in Ajaccio from 1957 to 1967, followed by Bondy, and finally at the Collège-lycée Jacques-Decour in Paris. He retired from teaching in 1986, and authored three textbooks.

Filippi-Codaccioni was a member of the French Communist Party in 1943. He served on the committee of the Communist Federation of Corsica from 1957 to 1967. He ran for mayor of Ajaccio in 1965, and for the National Assembly in 1967, but lost both times. He was the deputy mayor of Aulnay-sous-Bois from 1971 to 1977. He authored a book about Communism, and he was the editor-in-chief of L'École et la Nation, an education magazine published by the French Communist Party.

== Personal life and death ==
Filippi-Codaccioni had a wife. He died on July 12, 2018, in Ajaccio, Corsica, France.

== Selected works ==
=== Textbooks ===
- Dermenjian, Geneviève; Filippi-Codaccioni, Ange-Marie; Mazet, Christine; Vila, Fantine (1987). Histoire : Seconde. Paris: Bordas. ISBN 9782040167745. OCLC 36104929.
- Dermenjian, Geneviève; Filippi-Codaccioni, Ange-Marie; Mazet, Christine (1988). Histoire : Première. Paris: Bordas. ISBN 9782040180966. OCLC 489571223.
- Brisson, Elisabeth; Dermenjian, Genevieve; Filippi-Codaccioni, Ange-Marie (1989). Histoire: Terminales. Paris: Bordas. ISBN 9782040182625. OCLC 895638047.

=== Politics ===
- Filippi-Codaccioni, Ange-Marie (1964). Pour une Corse heureuse dans une France démocratique. Ajaccio: Fédération de la Corse du Parti communiste français. OCLC 492082279.
