= Vidmantė Jasukaitytė =

Lithuanian writer (1948–2018)

Vidmantė Jasukaitytė (10 July 1948 – 14 July 2018) was a Lithuanian writer and signatory of the 1990 Act of the Re-Establishment of the State of Lithuania.

== Biography ==
Vidmantė Jasukaitytė was born in 1948 in a village near Šiauliai called Pumpučiai. When she graduated from secondary school she was already working for a living. She studied Lithuanian language and literature at the University of Vilnius. She has worked in various institutions. Her creative work started with writing poetry. Her first poetry book A Fire to be Crossed earned her the Zigmas Gaidamavičius award for the best debut. Her second prose book Stebuklinga patvorių žolė (Miraculous Grass by the Fence) placed the author among serious Lithuanian writers, and was translated into Spanish (La milagrosa hierba de la raíz amarga) and published in Madrid in 2002. The novel After Us There Is no Us had an edition of 45,000 copies that were sold out within two months. Consequently, the novel was awarded the prominent Juozas Paukštelis literary prize. She faced difficulties publishing some of her works due to Soviet censorship.

From the very beginning of the independence movement in Lithuania, Jasukaityte, who already was well-known national writer, took part in its activity. She founded the Lithuanian Women's Union, started and developed a social protest against Lithuanian men's service in the Soviet Army where they often experienced various forms of humiliation. When the Soviet leader at the time M. Gorbachev was visiting Lithuania, she gave a speech that was broadcast all over Soviet Union and made a considerable impact on the army system – every military unit was obligated to write a letter in which it had to reject Vidmantė . accusations. Letters flooded her house and the Lithuanian Writer's Union. The military newspaper Zvezda (The Star) demanded that she should come and take away stacks of letters that occupied half of the space of their editorial office. The writer also received many telegrams from the ordinary people of Russia. In 1990 she was elected to the Lithuanian Parliament that proclaimed the independence of Lithuania. V. Jasukaityte also signed the Pact of Independence. The political commotion affected her private life. Even though she had never belonged to a party, the writer experienced spiritual isolation as well as open attacks of political extremists. After ten years and a long trip to Egypt, she returned home and started writing again.

== Political activities ==
Jasukaitytė joined the pro-independence Sąjūdis movement. She founded and was elected chairman of the Lithuanian Women's Union. The Union organized a social protest against Lithuanian men's service in the Soviet Army where they often experienced various forms of humiliation. When the Soviet leader Mikhail Gorbachev visited Lithuania, Jasukaitytė gave a speech, broadcast over TV, accusing the Soviet military of mistreatment of their soldiers. After the controversial speech letters flooded her house and the Lithuanian Writer's Union. Jasukaitytė was elected to the Supreme Soviet of the Lithuanian SSR and became signatory of the Act of the Re-Establishment of the State of Lithuania.

== Works ==
- Fire to be Crossed (poetry, 1976)
- I'm so Far Away (poetry, 1979)
- Miraculous Grass by the Fence (short stories, 1981)
- Man, my Brother (1982)
- Too Much Sun (poetry, 1986)
- Žemaitė (drama, 1986)
- Žilvinas (tragedy, 1988)
- After Us There Is No Us (novel, 1988)
- The Dove That Shall Wait (short stories, 1989)
- Grass Roots (screenplay, 1989)
- The Wolves' Hunt (drama, 1990)
- Say Farewell to Unmined Silver (poetry, 1999)
- Golgotha's Grapes (essays, meditations, prayers, 2001)
- Mary the Egyptian (novel, 2002)
- The True Face of Nonexistence (poetry, 2002)
- Subačius Street. Ghetto (poetry, 2003)
- God Dies Lonely (novel, 2003)
- Miraculous Grass by the Fence (2005)
- When We Were Wolves (novel, 2007)
- After Us There Is No Us (novel, 2005–2008)
- La loba (poetry, 2008)
- What After Nothing? (poetry, 2008)
- I Killed My Daughter (novel, 2008)
