= T. H. P. Chentharasseri =

Indian historian (1928–2018)

T.H.P. Chentharassery
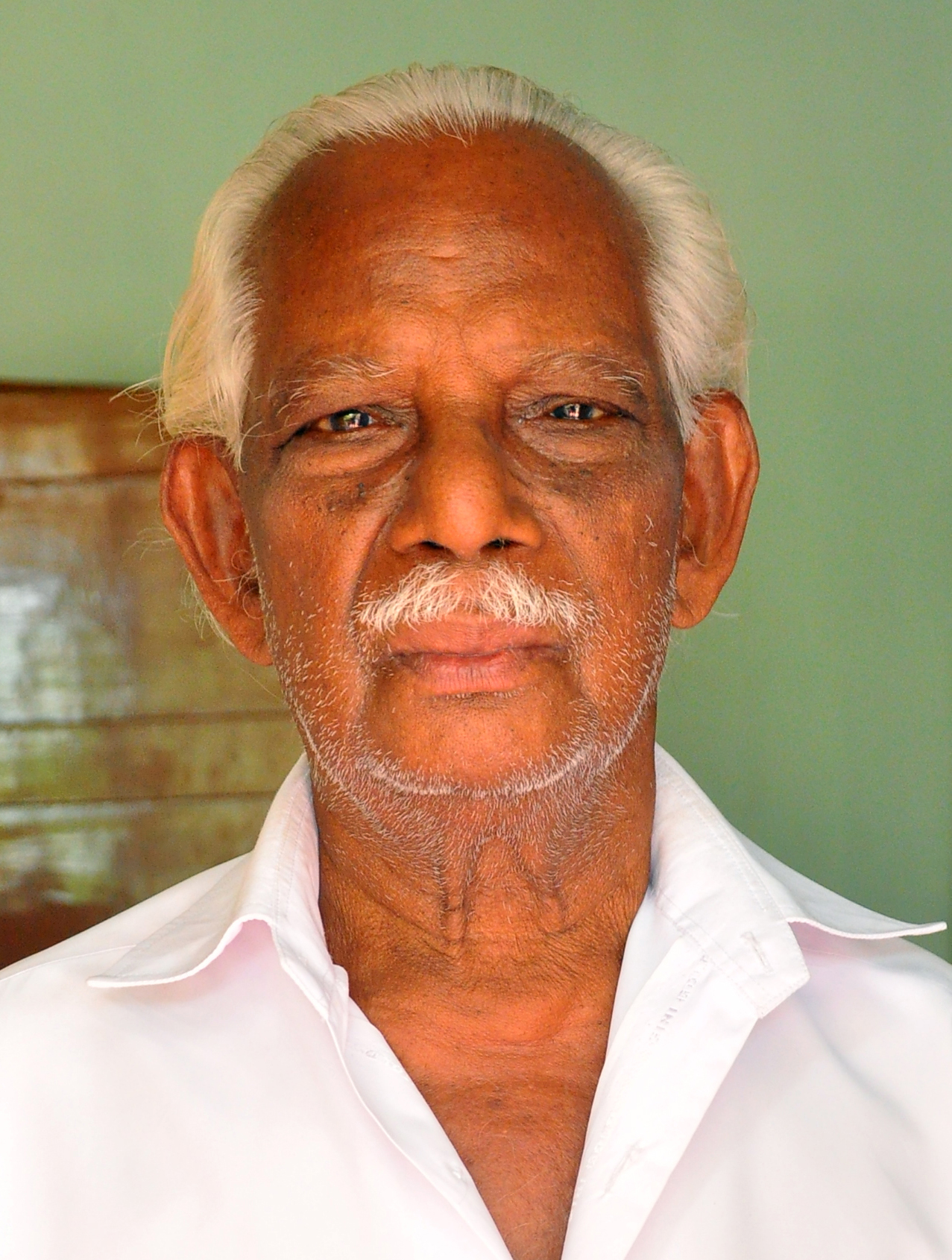
- Chentharassery in 2015
- Born: Thiruvan Heera Prassad Chentharassery; 29 July 1928; Thiruvalla, British India
- Died: 27 July 2018 (aged 89); Thiruvananthapuram, Kerala, India
- Occupation: Historian

Thiruvan Heera Prassad Chentharassery (29 July 1928 – 27 July 2018), better known as T. H. P. Chentharasseri, was an Indian historian from Kerala. He was one of the leading Keralan historians on the study of the caste system in India.

== Life and career ==
He was born in Ennikkattu tharavadu Othara Thiruvalla Pathanamthitta as the son of Kannan Thiruvan and Aninjan Anima, and resided at Pattom Thiruvananthapuram. His father Thuvan was the Thiuvalla Area Secretary for the organization Sadhujana Paripalana Sankham.

He attended Othara Primary School, Chengannur Government High School, Kottayam Karappuzha NSS High School, Changanassery St. Berchman's College, Thiruvananthapuram Mar Ivanios College and Thiruvananthapuram MG College. He was an employee in the Accountant General Office.
