= Max Ritchie =

Australian rules footballer (1934–2018)

Personal information
- Full name: Maxwell Pym Ritchie
- Born: 4 November 1934; Henty, New South Wales
- Died: 28 July 2018 (aged 83)
- Original team: Culcairn
- Height: 184 cm (6 ft 0 in)
- Weight: 91 kg (201 lb)
- Position: Follower

Playing career^{1}
Years	Club	Games (Goals)
1955–60	North Melbourne	55 (7)
- ^{1} Playing statistics correct to the end of 1960.

Maxwell Pym Ritchie (4 November 1934 – 28 July 2018) was an Australian rules footballer who played with North Melbourne in the Victorian Football League (VFL).
