= Irini Lambraki =

Greek politician (1949–2018)

Irini Lambraki (Greek: Ειρήνη Λαμπράκη; 5 January 1949 – 20 July 2018) was a Greek politician.

== Life ==
Lambraki was born in Ioannina in 1949. She studied at the Law School of Athens and completed her postgraduate studies of Commercial Law at LMU Munich and the University of Perugia (art history and Italian literature).

Lambraki became a PASOK MP in the Athens B electoral district from 1977 to 1989 and Deputy Minister of Culture from 1988 to 1989. She was also a PASOK MEP (1994-1999). She was member of the Council of Europe between 1982 and 1985.

Lambraki died on 20 July 2018 while she was on vacation in Skiathos; her death was attributed to pathological causes. Her body was moved to Athens under the care of the Greek Parliament.
