= Saleem Shahzad (politician) =

Pakistani politician

Saleem Shahzad (11 July 1958 – 8 July 2018) born Syed Saleem Ul Haque, was a Pakistani politician associated with the MQM.

He was born Syed Salimul Haq. As a student at Urdu Science College, Karachi, Shahzad joined the Mohajir Student Organisation in 1979. He was a founding member of its successor, the Muttahida Qaumi Movement, and elected to the Karachi municipal council in 1987. Shahzad was seated in the National Assembly of Pakistan in 1988, representing Orangi Town. His opponent, Afaq Khan Shahid, won roughly 18,000 votes, while Shahzad received over 82,000 votes. He won reelection in 1990 with over 93,000 votes. Many MQM members were targeted during Operation Clean-up, and as a result Shahzad moved to the United Kingdom. While in exile, Shahzad remained active in MQM's London faction. He was expelled from the party for the first time in 2009, and later resumed membership. Beginning in 2010, Shahzad scaled back his involvement with MQM due to a disagreement with Altaf Hussain. Shahzad was suspended from the party in 2013 and subsequently expelled for a second time in 2014. He was diagnosed with liver and kidney cancer in 2015. Shahzad returned to Pakistan in February 2017, and was arrested. After his release in June, Shahzad was diagnosed with cancer and tried to find treatment. Shahzad attempted a political comeback by founding his own party, but joined the Pakistan Tehreek-i-Insaf in January 2018. He died of lung cancer in London on 8 July 2018, aged 62.
