= Phail Wynn =

American academic administrator (c.1948–2018)

Phail Wynn Jr.
- Born: c. 1948; Oklahoma, U.S.
- Died: July 24, 2018 (aged 70); Durham, North Carolina, U.S.
- Education: University of Oklahoma; North Carolina State University; University of North Carolina at Chapel Hill
- Occupations: Academic administrator, businessman
- Spouse: Peggy
- Children: 1

Phail Wynn, Jr. (c. 1948 – July 24, 2018) was an American academic administrator, corporate director and Vietnam War veteran. He was the president of the Durham Technical Community College from 1980 to 2007.

== Early life ==
Wynn was born in an African-American family c. 1948 in Oklahoma. He graduated from the University of Oklahoma, where he earned a bachelor's degree. He earned a PhD from North Carolina State University and an MBA from the University of North Carolina at Chapel Hill. He joined the United States Army and served in Vietnam during the Vietnam War.

== Career ==
Wynn served as the president of Durham Technical Community College from 1980 to 2007, and as the vice president for Durham and Regional Affairs at Duke University from 2007 to 2018.

Wynn served on the board of directors of SunTrust Banks from 2004 to 2018.

Wynn served on the Board, Leadership Council, and as Interim president of Triangle Community Foundation on two separate occasions.

== Personal life and death ==
Wynn had a wife, Peggy, and a son, Rahsaan, a Marine Corps master gunnery sergeant. They resided in Durham, North Carolina, where he died on July 24, 2018, at age 70. His funeral was held on July 30, 2018, at the Duke Chapel.
