= Queen Worlu =

Nigerian career diplomat (1960–2018)

Queen Imaria Worlu (April 4, 1960 – July 9, 2018) was a Nigerian career diplomat. She served as Nigeria's Ambassador to neighboring São Tomé and Príncipe from 2017 until her death in 2018.

== Biography and career ==
Worlu was born in Benin City, Edo State, April 4, 1960, to Chief Christopher Osifo and Ijose Ogiamen. She was her parents' third child. Worlu enrolled at St Maria Goretti College in Benin City, from which she received her West African School Certificate (WASC) in 1975. She then attended Idi College in Benin City beginning in 1977, which led to her acceptance to the University of Lagos, also in 1977.

Worlu received her Bachelor's of Arts in philosophy from the University of Lagos in 1981. She joined the National Youth Service Corps (NYSC) from 1981 to 1982 following her graduation and was sent to Jos in Plateau State.

Queen Worlu later completed her postgraduate diploma in international relations at the Foreign Service Academy in Lagos. During her diplomatic career, Worlu also obtained another postgraduate degree in theology from Redeemer's University Nigeria, a certificate in Protocol Service Duties while stationed in Rome, and a Master's in Business Administration (MBA) from the Shobhit Institute of Engineering & Technology in Meerut, India.

In 1987, Worlu joined the Nigerian Foreign Service. She served in the Foreign Service and the Ministry of Foreign Affairs until her death in 2018. Worlu was posted as a consular officer at the Embassy of Nigeria in Lisbon, Portugal, from 1998 until 2003. She also participated in United Nations peacekeeping conferences and workshops in Ghana, Liberia and Sierra Leone.

In June 2014, Worlu was posted to the Nigeria High Commission in New Delhi, India, as a trade and development minister. She was promoted to Deputy High Commissioner during her tenure in New Delhi, which lasted from 2014 until 2015. As Deputy High Commissioner to India, she filled in as acting High Commissioner on several occasions from 2015 to 2016.

Later, Queen Worlu was a member of high-level negotiations between India and Nigeria. As a result of the negotiations, India extended a $100 million line of credit to Nigeria.

In 2017, President Muhammadu Buhari appointed Worlu as Ambassador of Nigeria to São Tomé and Príncipe. She held the ambassadorship until her death in July 2018.

Queen Worlu died during her posting in São Tomé on July 9, 2018, at the age of 58, following a brief illness. She was survived by her husband, Sampson O. Worlu, the former director general of the Voice of Nigeria, and their three sons - Jesse, Chizi and Chituga. She was buried in Abuja following her funeral on July 27, 2018.
