= Feliciano Amaral =

Brazilian pastor and Christian singer

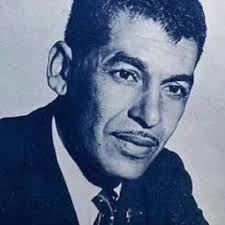

Background information
- Born: October 20, 1920; Miradouro, Minas Gerais, Brazil
- Died: July 7, 2018 (aged 97)
- Genres: Christian Church Music
- Occupation: Singer
- Instrument: Vocals
- Years active: 1948–2018

Feliciano Amaral (October 20, 1920 – July 7, 2018) was a Brazilian pastor and Christian singer.
