= Greg Krosnes =

American stage actor, educator, and director (1967–2018)

Gregory Kevin Krosnes
- Born: September 19, 1967; Whiteman Air Force Base, Missouri
- Died: July 3, 2018 (aged 50); Memphis Tennessee, U.S.
- Education: Rhodes College; University of California, Irvine
- Occupations: Actor, voice actor, director, educator

Gregory Kevin Krosnes (September 19, 1967 – July 3, 2018) was an American stage actor, educator, and director. A transplant to Memphis, Krosnes was a prominent member of the Memphis theatre community.

== Early life ==
Born to a military family, Krosnes lived in several locations in the United States and Germany. Krosnes settled in Memphis for a while, where he attended Germantown High School. Krosnes then earned his BA in theatre and media arts from Rhodes College and later his MFA in acting from the University of California, Irvine.

== Career ==
Krosnes made his collegiate theatre debut during his first year at Rhodes College when he acted in the college's production of The Rivals. At Rhodes, Krosnes was also a member of the Rhodes Singers. Krosnes returned to Memphis after earning his master's degree. There, he taught at his alma mater Rhodes College and later at Arlington High School. In 2011, Freed-Hardeman University (Tennessee) awarded Krosnes a post-graduate degree of Master of Education (MED).

Krosnes had a penchant for physical comedy and musical theatre and received an Ostrander award for Best Actor in All My Sons.

=== Credits ===
==== Stage acting ====
- The Rivals
- All My Sons as Chris Keller
- The Robber Bridegroom as Jamie Lockheart
- Big River as Tom Sawyer
- Little Shop of Horrors as Mushnik
- The Addams Family as Mal Beineke
- Mamma Mia! as Bill Austin
- On the Razzle
- A Perfect Ganesh as The Man
- Twilight of the Gods (2012) as Sir Arthur Conan Doyle

==== Voice acting ====
- The Fisherman and His Soul as Ensemble
- Spoon River Anthology as Albert Schirding
- The Dead Girl (2007) as Joe Sykes
- Roman à Clef (2007) as Gary
- Rip Van Winkle (2008) as Rip Van Winkle
- The Shepherd of the Clouds (2010) as Giles

==== Directing ====
- The Queen Bee (2008) with Chatterbox Audio Theater
