= Jan Górny (field hockey) =

Polish field hockey player (1933–2018)

Personal information
- Nationality: Polish
- Born: 17 January 1933 Gniezno, Poland
- Died: 13 July 2018 (aged 85)

Sport
- Sport: Field hockey

Jan Górny (17 January 1933 – 13 July 2018) was a Polish field hockey player. He competed in the men's tournament at the 1960 Summer Olympics.
