= William McCrary =

American baseball player (1929–2018)

- Shortstop
- Born: November 5, 1929; Beloit, Wisconsin
- Died: July 21, 2018 (aged 88); Hot Springs Village, Arkansas

Negro league baseball debut
- 1946, for the Kansas City Monarchs

Last appearance
- 1947, for the Kansas City Monarchs

Teams
- Kansas City Monarchs (1946–47)

William L. McCrary (November 5, 1929 – July 21, 2018), nicknamed "Youngblood", was an American baseball shortstop who played for the Negro American League's Kansas City Monarchs in 1947-48, in the minor league organizations of the New York Yankees and Chicago Cubs, and with the semi-pro Omaha Rockets.

== Personal life ==
McCrary was born in Beloit, Wisconsin, on November 5, 1929, and was adopted at seven weeks of age by Bud and Estella (Kidd) McCrary. He received his nickname from Negro leagues legend Satchel Paige.

Following his playing career he was a foreman for Alcoa and General Motors corporations, and owned a janitorial service. He was inducted into the Beloit (WI) Sports Hall of Fame in 2014. Late in life, McCrary became an ambassador for the Negro leagues, often making personal appearances and sharing his experiences of life in the era of segregated baseball. He was featured in the biography "A Legend Among Us: The Story of William "Youngblood" McCrary" by Linda Pennington Black, published in 2014.

Bill McCrary died on July 21, 2018, in Hot Spring Village, AR at the age of 88.
