= Michel Tromont =

Belgian politician (1937–2018)

Governor of Hainaut Province
- In office 1983–2004

Minister of National Education
- In office 1981–1983

Member of the Chamber of Representatives (Belgium)
- In office 1978–1983

Mayor of Quiévrain
- In office 1977–1983

Personal details
- Born: June 24, 1937 Belgium
- Died: July 9, 2018 (aged 81)
- Party: Liberal Reformist Party

Michel Jules Arthur Tromont (24 June 1937 – 9 July 2018) was a Belgian politician. A member of the Liberal Reformist Party, he was a deputy in the Chamber of Representatives from 1978 to 1983, serving as Minister of National Education from 1981 to 1983 and mayor of Quiévrain from 1977 to 1983. He was also Governor of the Hainaut province from 1983 to 2004.

Graduated in applied economic sciences from the Warocqué Faculty in 1971, Tromont first worked as a teacher but simultaneously began a political career that would lead him to the highest responsibilities of the State.
