= Stavros Tsakyrakis =

Greek jurist and academic (1951–2018)

Stauros Tsakyrakis (Greek: Σταύρος Τσακυράκης; 1951 – 21 July 2018) was a Greek jurist and academic, Professor of Constitutional Law at Law School of the University of Athens.

== Biography ==
He was born in Mithymna, in Lesbos island and attended a scholarship at Athens College. He then studied Law at the University of Athens, where he was politically active. During the period of the Regime of the Colonels he was secretary of Greek Communist Youth – Rigas Feraios and a member of the Coordinating Committee of Occupation of the Polytechnic and took part at the uprising. For his anti-dictatorial action he was arrested, imprisoned and tortured in the Greek Military Police detention facilities.

Followed postgraduate studies in Philosophy of Law at the University of Rome. In 1990, he was awarded a law degree in Constitutional Law at the University of Athens.

He was Professor of Constitutional Law at the Law School of the University of Athens, where in April 2018 he made the last lesson in a packed room as he would retire at the end of the academic year 2017-2018. At the same time, he was an academic visitor at the Harvard, Columbia and New York universities.

In the 2014 European elections he was nominated with The River without success. He wrote regularly in legal journals and in the daily press and was a member of the Scientific Committee of The Books' Journal.

On 1 February 2016 Vassiliki Thanou, then the president of the Supreme Court, filed an indictment against him for insulting and defamation because of ratings she had used in her article in her personal blog. In their announcement, 14 professors of constitutional law expressed their opposition to the motion of the President of the Supreme Court asking her to withdraw the crime.

He died on 21 July 2018 in Mytilene from cancer.
