= Manfred Wuttich =

German footballer

Personal information
- Full name: Manfred Wuttich
- Date of birth: 26 January 1941
- Place of birth: Germany
- Date of death: 31 July 2018 (aged 77)
- Position: Striker

Senior career*
Years	Team	Apps	(Gls)
1962–1965	Eintracht Braunschweig	51	(26)
1965–1968	VfL Wolfsburg		
- * Club domestic league appearances and goals

Manfred Wuttich (26 January 1941 – 31 July 2018) was a German footballer. He spent two seasons in the Bundesliga with Eintracht Braunschweig.
