= Robert Thunell =

American oceanographer (1951–2018)

Robert Carl Thunell (February 16, 1951 – July 30, 2018) was an American oceanographer.

Born in Queens, New York City, on February 16, 1951, to parents Carl and Betty Hornbacher Thunell, Robert Thunell attended Brown University, where he played lacrosse and earned a bachelor's degree in geology/biology. Thunell pursued graduate study in oceanography at the University of Rhode Island. Upon earning his doctorate, Thunell became a postdoctoral fellow at Woods Hole Oceanographic Institution, after which he joined the University of South Carolina faculty in 1979. Thunell was named a fellow of the Geological Society of America in 1987. That same year, he also became a full professor. Five years later, Thunell was appointed a Carolina Distinguished Professor. He was granted fellowship by the American Geophysical Union and American Association for the Advancement of Science, in 2006 and 2010, respectively.
