= Natalia Tanner =

American physician (1922–2018)

Natalia Tanner (June 28, 1922 – July 14, 2018) was an American physician. She was the first female African-American fellow of the American Academy of Pediatrics. She is known for her activism promoting women and people of color in medicine and fighting health inequality in the United States.

== Early life and education ==
Born in Jackson, Mississippi, Tanner moved to Chicago where her father, Joseph Rush Tanner, practiced medicine, and her mother, Doris Murphy Tanner, stayed home to care for the family. She attended Englewood High School, graduating in 1939. Tanner spent the first two years of her undergraduate education at Fisk University, in Nashville, Tennessee, then transferred to the University of Chicago's premedical program. After earning her bachelor's degree, she attended Meharry Medical College in Nashville. While at Meharry Medical College, she was a member of the first sorority, at Meharry, Delta Sigma Theta, and acted as treasurer. Tanner graduated in 1946, then moved to New York City, where she was an intern at Harlem Hospital in 1946 and 1947. She then returned to the University of Chicago for her residency in pediatrics, becoming the institution's first African-American resident. She also trained at Meharry's Hubbard Hospital for a time; she finished her postgraduate education in 1950.

== Career ==
After completing her postgraduate education, Tanner moved back to Chicago for a short time, then married and moved to Detroit, Michigan with her husband, Dr. Waldo Cain, in 1951, where she became the city's first African-American board-certified pediatrician. She had been accepted as a Fellow of the American Academy of Pediatrics while still in Illinois, its first African-American fellow, but was spurned by the Detroit Pediatric Society and the Michigan chapter of the AAP. Despite discrimination, Tanner became the first African-American physician at the Children's Hospital of Michigan, a still-segregated institution. While working there, she fostered collaboration between the Society for Adolescent Medicine, the National Committee on Adolescence for the AAP, and the pediatric section of the National Medical Association. Tanner remained on staff at Children's Hospital of Michigan for over 50 years.

In 1968, Tanner became a professor at Wayne State University School of Medicine, while continuing to practice medicine; she was appointed a full professor in 1992. In 1983 she became the first woman and first African-American to be president of the Michigan AAP chapter. Throughout her career, she worked to foster greater participation by people of color and women in medicine, with underserved populations and the NAACP.

== Death ==
Tanner died in Southfield, Michigan on 14, 2018.

== Honors and awards ==
- Fellow, American Academy of Pediatrics (1951)
- Executive board, Society for Adolescent Medicine (1969)
- Pediatrics chair, National Medical Association (1969)
- Outstanding Achievement Award in Adolescent Medicine, Society for Adolescent Medicine (2001)
- Distinguished Service Award, National Medical Association (2001)
- Distinguished Alumnus Award, Children Hospital of Michigan (2003)
- Distinguished Warrior Award, Detroit Urban League (2003)
- Pediatrician of the Year William Montgomery Award, Michigan chapter of the American Academy of Pediatrics (2008)
- Member, Wayne County Medical Society
- Member, Michigan State Medical Society
- Member, National Medical Association
- Member, Detroit Medical Society
- Member, Society for Pediatric and Adolescent Gynecology
- Member, Society for Adolescent Medicine
- Member, United Pediatric Society
