= Harold Sorgenti =

American engineer (1934–2018)

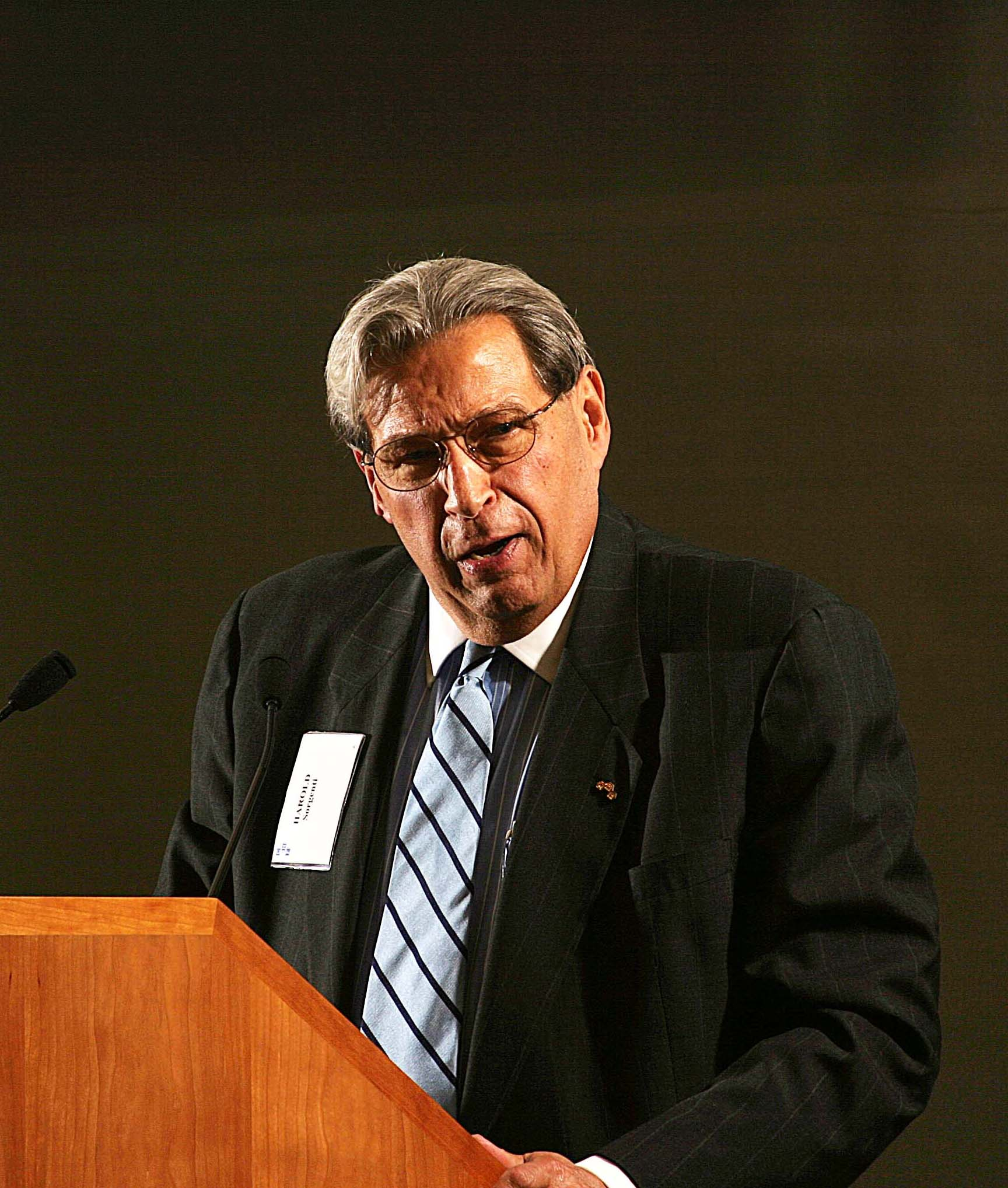
- Harold Sorgenti, 2004
- Born: May 28, 1934; New York City, New York
- Died: July 11, 2018 (aged 84); Philadelphia, Pennsylvania
- Scientific career
- Fields: Chemistry

Harold Sorgenti was an American engineer, businessman and investor, the former president and chief executive officer of ARCO Chemical and a key member of Ennovance Capital. He has served as chairman of the Pennsylvania Academy of the Fine Arts and the Philadelphia Orchestra.

== Education ==
Sorgenti received a B.S. in Chemical Engineering from City College of New York and an M.S. in Chemical Engineering from Ohio State University.

== Career ==
Sorgenti started his career as a scientist for ARCO Chemical company, a subsidiary of Atlantic Richfield, where he developed several U.S. patents that led to the formation of new chemical industrial processes. He served as president and chief executive officer of ARCO Chemical between 1979 and 1991, where he headed the transformation of ARCO Chemical that led to splitting the company into two entities: Lyondell Petrochemical (now LyondellBasell) and ARCO Chemical Company.

After serving for ARCO Chemical, he co-founded with Fred Rullo the Freedom Chemical Company, a company that made several lower middle-market acquisitions of specialty chemical companies, which sold to BFGoodrich for $375 million in 1998.

In 2003 Sorgenti received the Petrochemical Heritage Award from the Chemical Heritage Foundation.

In 2010, Sorgenti joined Ennovance Capital, a Philadelphia-based private equity firm, as an operating partner.

Sorgenti died on July 11, 2018.

== Cultural activities ==
In 1980 Sorgenti joined the board of the Pennsylvania Academy of the Fine Arts and was chairman from 1986 to 1993. From 2005 to 2009 he served as chairman of the Philadelphia Orchestra.
