= Leo E. Litwak =

American short story writer and novelist (1924–2018)

- Born: May 28, 1924
- Died: July 27, 2018 (aged 94)
- Education: Wayne State University; Columbia University
- Occupations: Short story writer; novelist
- Children: 1
- Parent: Isaac Litwak (father)
- Writing career
- Notable awards: O. Henry Award (1990)

Leo E. Litwak (May 28, 1924 – July 27, 2018) was an American short story writer and novelist.

== Life ==
He attended Wayne State University and Columbia University. He taught at San Francisco State University. He was a medic in World War II, which was the subject of his 2001 memoir, The Medic: Life and Death in the Last Days of WWII.

His work appeared in The New York Times and TriQuarterly. His papers are held at Washington University Libraries.

Litwak's daughter is playwright and actress Jessica Litwak. He has two grand children, Emil Weinstein and Sophia Litwak. He was the son of union leader Isaac Litwak, whose life was the basis of Leo Litwak's novel, Waiting for the News.

== Awards ==
- 1970 Guggenheim Fellow
- 1970 National Jewish Book Award for Waiting for the News
- 1990 O. Henry Award

== Works ==
- "The Eleventh Edition" TriQuarterly, No. 74, Winter 1989

=== Novels ===
- To the Hanging Gardens (1964) Andre Deutsch
- Waiting for the News (1969)

=== Non-fiction ===
- College Days in Earthquake Country (1971)
- Medic 2001

=== Anthologies ===
- Leonard Michaels; David Reid; Raquel Scherr, eds. (1995). "Spirits". West of the West: imagining California : an anthology. University of California Press. ISBN 978-0-520-20164-4.
- Jerome Charyn, ed. (1969). The single voice: an anthology of contemporary fiction. Collier Books.
- Saul Bellow, ed. (1963). Great Jewish Short Stories. Dell. ISBN 9780440331223.

=== Criticism ===
- Leo E. Litwak (January 29, 1967). "Hell's Angels". The New York Times Book Review.
- Leo E. Litwak (January 29, 1967). "On the Wild Side". The New York Times.
- Leo E. Litwak (December 31, 1967). "A Trip to Esalen Institute--". The New York Times.
