= Nancy M. Petry =

American psychologist (1968–2018)

- Born: November 1, 1968; Aberdeen, South Dakota, U.S.
- Died: July 17, 2018 (aged 49); Canton, Connecticut, U.S.
- Education: Randolph Macon Women's College; Harvard University
- Occupations: Professor of Medicine, University of Connecticut Health Center

Nancy M. Petry (November 1, 1968 – July 17, 2018) was a psychologist known for her research on behavioral treatments for addictive disorders, behavioral pharmacology, impulsivity and compulsive gambling. She was Professor of Medicine at the University of Connecticut Health Center. Petry served as a member of the American Psychiatric Association Workgroup on Substance Use Disorders for the DSM-5 and chaired the Subcommittee on Non-Substance Behavioral Addictions. The latter category includes Internet addiction disorder and problem gambling. She also served as a member of the Board of Advisors of Children and Screens: Institute of Digital Media and Child Development.

Petry received the American Psychological Association (APA) Award for Distinguished Scientific Early Career Contributions to Psychology in 2003 for "groundbreaking work on the problem of gambling and substantial contributions to the treatment of other addictive behaviors." Petry's other awards include the APA Young Psychopharmacologist Award (1999), the National Center for Responsible Gaming Award for Scientific Achievement in Gambling Studies (2002), the Joseph Cochin Award from the College on Problems of Drug Dependence (2007), and the Connecticut Technology Council's Women of Innovation Award for Research Innovation and Leadership (2017).

== Biography ==
Petry completed a bachelor's degree at the Randolph Macon Woman's College in 1990 and a PhD in Experimental Psychology at Harvard University in 1994. She conducted clinical research on drug abuse at the University of Vermont from 1994–96, where she evaluated optimal dosing strategies for opioid-dependent patients. Petry joined the Faculty of Medicine at the University of Connecticut Health Center in 1996 and she conducted clinical research on the effectiveness of contingency management as treatment for addiction. She served as the Editor-in-Chief of the journal Psychology of Addictive Behaviors.

Petry was the author of Contingency Management for Substance Abuse Treatment: A Guide to Implementing This Evidence-Based Practice, which provided an overview of clinical behavior analysis, utilizing positive reinforcement and stimulus control to treat problematic behavior. Petry also authored Pathological Gambling: Etiology, Comorbidity, and Treatment, and was the editor of the volume Behavioral Addictions: DSM-5® and Beyond. Her research was funded by the National Institute on Drug Abuse, the National Institute of Mental Health, and the National Institute on Alcohol Abuse and Alcoholism.

=== Death ===
Petry died of breast cancer, aged 49, on July 17, 2018, in Canton, Connecticut.

== Research ==
Petry conducted research that aimed to improve behavioral treatments for individuals with addictive disorders, ranging from substance use disorder to pathological gambling to Internet addiction. She aimed to increase patient adherence to treatment through contingency management, which is a form of behavior modification. She also worked in the domain of gambling disorder by researching on ideas related to discounting rewards.

Petry was involved analyzing data from the National Epidemiologic Survey on Alcohol and Related Conditions, a large-scale study involving a diverse sample of over 36,000 individuals. Petry's work on this study examined various forms of impulsive behavior including gambling and shoplifting, and comorbidity of addictive behavior with other conditions including obesity and other medical problems.

Other work examined delay discounting in relation to impulsiveness. Delay discounting refers to the decline in the value of a reward when there is a delay in its receipt. Petry's work demonstrated that heroin addicts showed a steeper decline in the value of a delayed reward relative to controls, indicative of a stronger preference for immediate rewards.

== Representative publications ==
- Kirby, K. N.; Petry, N. M.; Bickel, W. K. (1999). "Heroin addicts have higher discount rates for delayed rewards than non-drug-using controls". Journal of Experimental Psychology: General. 128 (1): 78–87. doi:10.1037/0096-3445.128.1.78. PMID 10100392.
- Petry, N. M. (2001). "Delay discounting of money and alcohol in actively using alcoholics, currently abstinent alcoholics, and controls". Psychopharmacology. 154 (3): 243–250. doi:10.1007/s002130000638. PMID 11351931. S2CID 21143275.
- Petry, N. M. (2001). "Pathological gamblers, with and without substance use disorders, discount delayed rewards at high rates". Journal of Abnormal Psychology. 110 (3): 482–487. doi:10.1037/0021-843x.110.3.482. PMID 11502091.
- Petry, N. M.; Barry, D.; Pietrzak, R. H.; Wagner, J. A. (2008). "Overweight and obesity are associated with psychiatric disorders: Results from the National Epidemiologic Survey on Alcohol and Related Conditions". Psychosomatic Medicine. 70 (3): 288–297. doi:10.1097/psy.0b013e3181651651. PMID 18378873. S2CID 37899251.
- Petry, N. M.; Stinson, F. S.; Grant, B. F. (2005). "Comorbidity of DSM-IV pathological gambling and other psychiatric disorders: results from the National Epidemiologic Survey on Alcohol and Related Conditions". The Journal of Clinical Psychiatry. 66 (5): 564–574. doi:10.4088/jcp.v66n0504. PMID 15889941.
