= American Society for Legal History =

- Abbreviation: ASLH
- Formation: 1956
- Type: Nonprofit organization
- Legal status: Learned society
- Members: 1,100 (2003)
- President: Mitra Sharafi
- President-elect: Michelle McKinley
- Secretary: Emily Prifogle

The American Society for Legal History is a learned society dedicated to promoting scholarship and teaching in the field of legal history.

It was founded in 1956 and has an international scope, despite being based in the United States. It sponsors the peer-reviewed journal Law and History Review and the book series Studies in Legal History, both of which are published by Cambridge University Press. In 1957, the Society established the American Journal of Legal History, which the Society originally published as its official journal. The journal was later acquired by the Temple University Beasley School of Law. It has been a member of the American Council of Learned Societies since 1973.
