= Law and History Review =

- Discipline: Legal history
- Language: English
- Edited by: Gautham Rao

Publication details
- History: 1983-present
- Publisher: Cambridge University Press
- Frequency: Quarterly
- Impact factor: 0.7 (2016)

Standard abbreviations
- Bluebook: Law & Hist. Rev.
- ISO 4: Law Hist. Rev.

Indexing
- ISSN: 0738-2480 (print); 1939-9022 (web)
- LCCN: 84645420

Links
- Journal homepage; Online access; Online archive

Law and History Review is a quarterly peer-reviewed academic journal covering legal history. It was established in 1983 and is published by Cambridge University Press on behalf of the American Society for Legal History, of which it is the official journal. The editor-in-chief is Gautham Rao (American University). According to the Journal Citation Reports, the journal has a 2016 impact factor of 0.7.
