= Paul Pruitt =

American politician

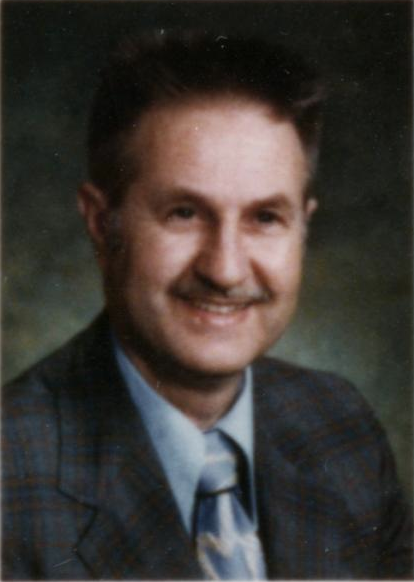
- Pruitt in 1977

Member of the Washington House of Representatives for the 34th district
- In office 1977–1985

Personal details
- Born: February 3, 1922 Shelton, Nebraska, U.S.
- Died: July 2, 2018 (aged 96) Tacoma, Washington, U.S.
- Party: Democratic
- Spouse: Mary Margaret

Paul F. Pruitt (February 3, 1922 – July 2, 2018) was an American politician in the state of Washington. He served the 34th district from 1977 to 1985. He died in July 2018 at the age of 96.
