= Vitaly Shentalinsky =

Russian writer and journalist (1939–2018)

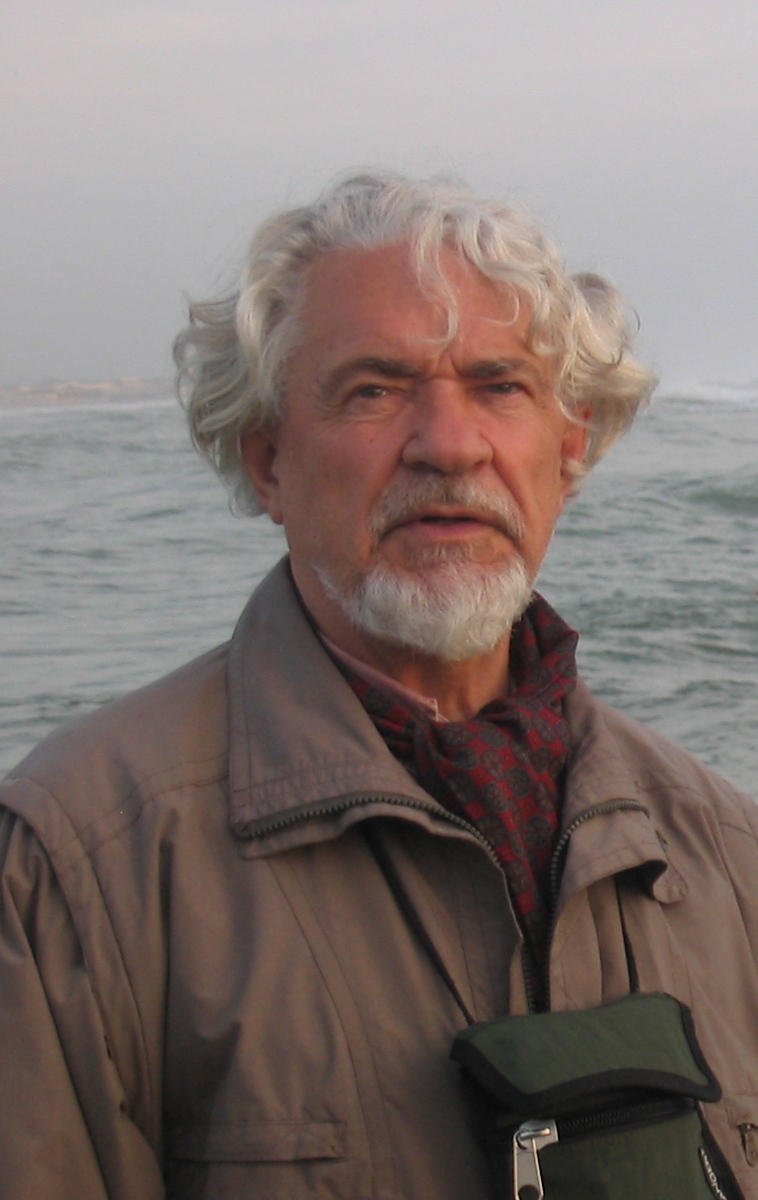

Vitaly Alexandrovich Shentalinsky (Russian: Виталий Александрович Шенталинский; 7 October 1939 – 27 July 2018) was a Russian writer and journalist. He became internationally known for his books on the fates of Russian writers during the Great Purge under the rule of Joseph Stalin.

== Life ==
Shentalinsky spent his school years in the Chistopol district of the Autonomous Soviet Republic Tatarstan. He graduated from the College of Arctic Maritime Studies (Арктическое морское училище) in Leningrad and subsequently studied at the Faculty of Journalism of Lomonosov State University in Moscow. He worked at a polar station on the Wrangel Island, and participated in five scientific expeditions in the Arctic. He worked for state television and several magazines, and was the author of travel reports from Siberia and the Arctic. He had a column dedicated to the conservation of nature and cultural monuments in the popular magazine Ogoniok. He also wrote several volumes of poetry.

During Perestroika under Mikhail Gorbachev he was elected to head a commission of the Union of Soviet Writers to investigate the fate of writers persecuted by Stalin's secret police NKVD. He then got permission to work in the KGB archives. On the basis of his research he published three volumes of documentation with extensive commentary. Chapters are devoted to Anna Akhmatova, Mikhail Bulgakov, Pavel Florensky, Maxim Gorky, Nikolai Klyuev, Ossip Mandelstam, Boris Pasternak, Boris Pilnyak and Marina Tsvetaeva. They contain longer extracts from snitch reports and interrogation protocols. He also published materials on the NKVD officer Yakov Agranov, who led many of the repressive measures against writers. Shentalinsky's books on the repression of writers were also published in English, French, German, Polish, Serbian and Spanish. Based on his work, several television documentaries were produced. His publications were praised by Alexander Solzhenitsyn and Yevgeny Yevtushenko.

In the Tatar community of Yuldus (district Chistopol), where he grew up, the "Shentalinsky Readings" have been taking place since 2013.

== Main works ==
- Рабы свободы в литературных архивах КГБ, Parus, Moscow 1995 ISBN 5-900920-01-1 (English edition: Arrested Voices. Resurrecting the Disappeared Writers of the Soviet Regime. With an introduction by Robert Conquest. Free Press, New York 1996 ISBN 978-0684827766).
- Преступление без наказания: документальные повести, Progress-Pleyada, Moscow 2007 ISBN 978-5-93006-033-1. (English edition: The KGB's Literary Archive, Introduction by Robert Conquest. The Harvill Press, London 1997 ISBN 978-1860460739).
- Донос на Сократа, Formika-S, Moscow 2001 ISBN 5-8463-0081-2
