= Paul Lufkin =

American ice hockey player and coach (1942–2019)

Biographical details
- Born: 1942; Gloucester, Massachusetts, U.S.
- Died: January 10, 2019; South Carolina, U.S.

Playing career
- 1961–1964: Boston College

Coaching career (HC unless noted)
- 1972–1976: Yale

Head coaching record
- Overall: 25-68-2

Paul Lufkin (1942 – January 10, 2019) is an American retired ice hockey player and coach. He was the head coach of Yale for a short time before Tim Taylor took over.

Lufkin played for Boston College in the early 1960s, playing under John Kelley and making the 1963 NCAA Tournament. His brief stint with Yale began with a rare winning season for the Bulldogs but declined sharply into a 1-win season in his third year there and he was gone soon thereafter.

== Head coaching record ==
Record table
Season	Team	Overall	Conference	Standing	Postseason
Yale Bulldogs (ECAC Hockey) (1972–1976)
1972–73	Yale	12-10-1	5-9-1	13th	
1973–74	Yale	8-16-0	5-13-0	15th	
1974–75	Yale	1-21-1	0-19-1	17th	
1975–76	Yale	4-21-0	1-20-0	17th	
Yale:		25-68-2	11-61-2		
Total:		25-68-2			
National champion Postseason invitational champion Conference regular season champion Conference regular season and conference tournament champion Division regular season champion Division regular season and conference tournament champion Conference tournament champion
