= David Ramsey (musician) =

Organist and pianist

- Born: December 12, 1939; Nashville Tennessee, U.S.
- Died: January 17, 2008 (aged 68); Memphis Tennessee, U.S.
- Education: Rhodes College; Union Theological Seminary
- Occupations: Pianist, organist

David Ramsey (December 12, 1939 – January 17, 2008) was a musician who specialized in playing the piano and organ. Ramsey was best known as the organist for the Memphis Redbirds.

== Early life ==
Born in Nashville, Tennessee, Ramsey earned his B.A. in music from Rhodes College (then called Southwestern at Memphis) in 1961 and his M.A. in sacred music from Union Theological Seminary in New York City in 1963.

== Career ==
Ramsey began his teaching career at his alma mater Rhodes College in 1965, at which time he also began serving as accompanist for the Rhodes Singers. Ramsey became a full-time staff member there in 1975. In 1990, Ramsey received the Charles E. Diehl Society Faculty Award for service from Rhodes. Ramsey was honored as a Distinguished Teacher of Music at Rhodes in 2002 and later named professor emeritus.

Ramsey served as the music director for St. John's United Methodist Church in Memphis from 1978 to 1999, where he provided music for church services each Sunday. Ramsey then served as the music director and provided music during Sunday church services for First Presbyterian Church in Memphis beginning in 1999 until his death in 2008.

Ramsey was best known, however, for his work with the Memphis Redbirds, the Triple-A affiliate of the St. Louis Cardinals. He began his tenure as organist for minor league baseball teams in 1971 with the Double-A Memphis Blues. Ramsey later played the organ during Memphis Chicks games at McCarver Stadium until the team switched to recorded music in 1995. Shortly after the Redbirds arrived in Memphis, Ramsey found himself behind the organ at Memphis baseball games once again at the request of Dean Jernigan, this time in the new AutoZone Park. Jernigan explained the decision by asking, "What's Memphis baseball without David Ramsey?" At the end of each game, Ramsey played "Shave and a Haircut." Though most professional baseball stadiums eventually switched to recorded music, Ramsey provided live organ music for the Redbirds until shortly before his death.

As the organist for Memphis baseball beginning in 1971, Ramsey played at 2 ballparks and saw more than 2,000 home games, 7 no-hitters, and 3 championship teams. He outlasted 15 general managers, 14 radio announcers, and 10 club presidents.
