= First Assembly Christian School =

- FACS

Location
- 8650 Walnut Grove Road; Memphis, Tennessee 38018; United States; 35.1275498°N 89.7765746°W

Information
- Type: Private, co-educational
- Motto: Training Minds, Shaping Lives for the Savior's Glory
- Religious affiliation: Christianity
- Denomination: Non-denominational
- Established: 1972
- Grades: pre-K–12
- Enrollment: 512
- Colors: Green and Gold
- Nickname: Crusaders
- Website: www.facsmemphis.org

First Assembly Christian school (FACS) is a private, college preparatory Christian school located in the Cordova section of Memphis, Tennessee. FACS was founded as First Assembly of God Christian School in 1972 to preserve white-only school in response to a federal court order requiring integrated schools. The school was initially located on Highland Street in Memphis before moving to Walnut Grove in Cordova.

== History ==
According to the historian Marcus Pohlmann, FACS was established in 1972 as part of a wave of private schools formed by white parents seeking to avoid sending their children to racially integrated public schools.

== Demographics ==
For the 2021-2022 school year, the school had 512 students in grade PK-12, of whom 6 were American Indian/Alaska Natives, 9 were Asian, 105 were Black, 38 were Hispanic, 297 were White, and 26 were of two or more races.
