= Joel Read =

President of Alverno College

Joel Read, SSSF (born Janice Anne Read; December 30, 1925 – May 25, 2017) was an American religious sister and the president of Alverno College from 1968 until 2003.

== Academic career ==
Read was born on December 30, 1925, in Chicago, Illinois. She graduated from Fordham University and Alverno College. She joined the School Sisters of St. Francis in 1942. She began teaching history at Alverno in 1955.

=== National Organization for Women ===
Read was one of the founding members of the National Organization for Women in 1966. In this role, she worked alongside notable feminist such as Pauli Murray and the Catholic feminist academic Elizabeth Farians. Read was an outspoken feminist who wrote in 1973, "The whole intent of women's studies is infused into every course offered on our campus...a women's college is a feminist institution."

=== Alverno presidency ===
In 1968, Read was appointed to be Alverno College's sixth president. In 1975, President Gerald Ford appointed Read to the National Commission on the Observance of International Women’s Year.

In 1985, Read was elected to the Wisconsin Academy of Arts and Sciences. Other education boards she has served on include the Foundation for Independent Higher Education, the American Council on Education, the Association of American Colleges and Universities and the National Catholic Educational Association.

Read retired in 2003. Her tenure as president is the longest of any college president in Alverno's history.

=== Death ===
She died on May 25, 2017, at the age of 91.

== Personal life ==
She took on the religious name Joel to honor her parents, who were named Joseph and Ellen Read.

== Honors ==
In 2000, she received the Lifetime Leadership Award from the Wisconsin Women in Higher Education Leadership. In 2003, Read received an honorary doctorate from Marquette University. She was honored by the U.S. Congress in 2017.
