= James H. Daughdrill Jr. =

American academic administrator (1934–2014)

18th President of Rhodes College
- In office 1973–1999
- Preceded by: William L. Bowden
- Succeeded by: William E. Troutt

Personal details
- Born: April 25, 1934 LaGrange, Georgia, US
- Died: May 3, 2014 (aged 80)
- Spouse: Elizabeth 'Libby' Gay Daughdrill
- Children: 3
- Education: Emory University

James Harold Daughdrill Jr. (April 25, 1934 – May 3, 2014) was the 18th president of Rhodes College. He was installed as president in 1973 and retired in 1999. He was the son of James Harold Daughdrill and Louisa Coffee Dozier. In 1964, he was the president of Kingston Mills, a $17 million carpet and textile business, but left that to study for the Presbyterian ministry. After finishing his studies for the ministry, he served as minister of St. Andrews Presbyterian Church in Little Rock, Arkansas from 1967 to 1970. He served as the Secretary of Stewardship of Presbyterian Church U.S. from 1970 to 1973.

== Career ==
Daughdrill became president of Rhodes College in 1973, a time when the college was struggling financially. During his tenure, he helped grow the student body from 980 students to 1,450 students. The college endowment grew from $6 million to over $200 million and during his tenure, Daughdrill maintained a balanced budget. In 1986, he initiated the change in the college's name from Southwestern at Memphis to Rhodes College after one of the college's previous presidents, Dr. Peyton Rhodes.

He was chairman of the Association of American Colleges and Universities, a member of the board of directors of the American Council on Education, and chairman of the Advisory Committee on Accreditation to the U.S. Department of Education.

== Personal ==
He attended the McCallie School in Chattanooga, Tennessee. He was an Eagle Scout and recipient of the Distinguished Eagle Scout Award. He attended Davidson College before graduating from Emory University in 1956. He went to the Columbia Theological Seminary where he graduated magna cum laude from in 1964. He was awarded an honorary Doctor of Divinity (D.D) degree from Davidson College.

On June 26, 1954, he married Elizabeth 'Libby' Anne Gay (born June 14, 1936). He was a member of Phi Delta Theta fraternity. He died on May 3, 2014, aged 80.

== Legacy ==
The J. Hal Daughdrill Award, is given to the "Most Valuable Player" of the Lynx football team. The award honors James Harold Daughdrill Sr. (1903–1986), outstanding football player, athlete, business leader, and the father of Rhodes' eighteenth President. The Rebecca Rish Gay Award and Walter E. Gay Award are given to the "Athletes of the Year" and are named after the parents of former President Daughdrill's wife, Libby Daughdrill.

== External sources ==
- Prayers at work
