= Louis Pounders =

American architect

Louis Pounders is an American architect in Memphis, Tennessee. He is a Fellow (FAIA) at the American Institute of Architects. He has worked with Askew Nixon Ferguson Architects. Pounders graduated from Rhodes College and received a Master of Architecture from Harvard Graduate School of Design. Pounders chaired the National AIA Committee on Design in 2009, the only Tennessee architect to have held the position. He co-authored A Survey of Modern Public Buildings in Memphis, Tennessee from 1940 to 1980. He designed his own home in 1996.

== Work ==
- Metropolitan Interfaith Association (MIFA)
- Tunica RiverPark in Mississippi
- Alex Haley Interpretive Center in Henning
- "On the Rocks" weekend house in Arkansas
