= Willie Hulon =

Willie T. Hulon was the executive assistant director of the National Security Branch of the Federal Bureau of Investigation (FBI) until January 11, 2008. He was succeeded by Arthur M. Cummings, II.

== Early life ==
Hulon was born in Memphis, Tennessee and earned a Bachelor of Arts degree from Rhodes College, Memphis, Tennessee, in 1979. He served as an officer in the Memphis Police Department from 1980 until 1983.

== FBI career ==
Hulon began his career as an FBI special agent in September 1983. After graduating from the FBI Academy, he was assigned to the FBI Office in Mobile, Alabama and subsequently served in Chicago, Illinois and San Antonio, Texas. During those assignments he conducted drug, gang, domestic terrorism, and violent crime investigations. Hulon was promoted to supervisory special agent of the Violent Crimes and Major Offenders Squad in San Antonio in May 1991. While in San Antonio, he formed and supervised a multi-agency task force which received recognition from the United States Attorney General for the successful prosecution of a Texas prison gang. In March 1995, he was transferred to FBI Headquarters and served as a supervisory special agent in Violent Crimes/Fugitive Unit until February 1996. Following that assignment, Hulon was promoted to assistant inspector in the Inspection Division at FBI Headquarters.

In June 1997, he was designated as chief of the Interstate Theft/Government Reservation crimes Unit at FBI Headquarters. In December 1997, Hulon was appointed as the assistant special agent in charge of the St. Louis Division. He was promoted to inspector, Office of Inspections, Inspection Division, FBI Headquarters, in December 2000. In July 2001, Hulon was designated chief inspector for the FBI. He was then appointed special agent in charge of the Detroit Office until returning to headquarters as deputy assistant director of the Counterterrorism Division.

Hulon was appointed by Director Mueller as the executive assistant director (EAD) of the National Security Branch (NSB) on June 19, 2006. He had previously served as acting EAD-NSB beginning on June 5, 2006. Prior to that, he was assistant director of the Counterterrorism Division (CTD), a position he had held since December 23, 2004. He also served as deputy assistant director of CTD beginning on April 16, 2004, before becoming the division's acting assistant director in November of that year.
