= William E. Troutt =

President of Rhodes College

19th President of Rhodes College
- In office March 30, 1999 – June 30, 2017
- Preceded by: James H. Daughdrill, Jr.
- Succeeded by: Marjorie Hass

10th President of Belmont University
- In office 1982–1999
- Preceded by: Herbert Gabhart
- Succeeded by: Robert Fisher

Personal details
- Born: June 13, 1949 (age 77) Bolivar, Tennessee, U.S.
- Education: Union University

William Earl "Bill" Troutt (born June 13, 1949) served as the 19th president of Rhodes College in Memphis, Tennessee from 1999 to 2017. From 1982 to 1999, he served as the President of Belmont University in Nashville, Tennessee.

== Biography ==
Dr. William E. Troutt brings 35 years of experience as a college president. In July 2017 he became President Emeritus of Rhodes College having led the college as president since 1999. A new college curriculum, innovative academic partnerships to enhance student learning, a re-centering and re-shaping of the campus, and a new trustee governance structure represent some of the outcomes of his leadership. During his tenure, Rhodes was twice named the “Most Service-Oriented College in America” by Newsweek. 2015 saw the completion of a $314 million Campaign for Rhodes to support student scholarships, faculty recruitment, community engagement, and campus enhancements.

Prior to Rhodes, Troutt served as president of Belmont University. During his 17-year tenure, Belmont evolved into one of the region's outstanding teaching universities. Under his leadership, Belmont increased enrollment by 75 percent, raised the ACT average from 16 to 25, and added geographic diversity with students from almost every state and 45 countries. Two successful campaigns for endowment and facilities dramatically increased program support and revitalized the campus with major renovations and new facility construction. He also led a successful land acquisition strategy in the heart of Nashville which enabled Belmont to double the size of its campus.

Prior to coming to Belmont as Executive Vice President, Troutt served from 1978 to 1980 as a Senior Associate with McManis Associates, a Washington, D.C. higher education consulting firm. As an Assistant Director of the Tennessee Higher Education Commission from 1975 to 1978, he served as an academic program officer and budget analyst for the commission that coordinates the program offerings and budget recommendations for Tennessee's public universities, colleges, and medical schools.

A nationally recognized leader in education, Troutt has chaired the American Council on Education, The National Commission on the Cost of Higher Education, the National Association of Independent Colleges and Universities, and the Jacob K. Javits Fellowship program. He currently serves as a trustee of the St. Jude Graduate School of Biomedical Sciences. He has been named one of America's most effective college presidents and in 2009 received the Distinguished Alumnus Award from Vanderbilt University's Peabody College.

== External sources ==
- Naples News, Matching students to the 'right' college is what's important
- New York Times College Biographies
