= Alex Haley House and Museum =

Historic house in Tennessee, United States

- W. E. Palmer House
- U.S. National Register of Historic Places
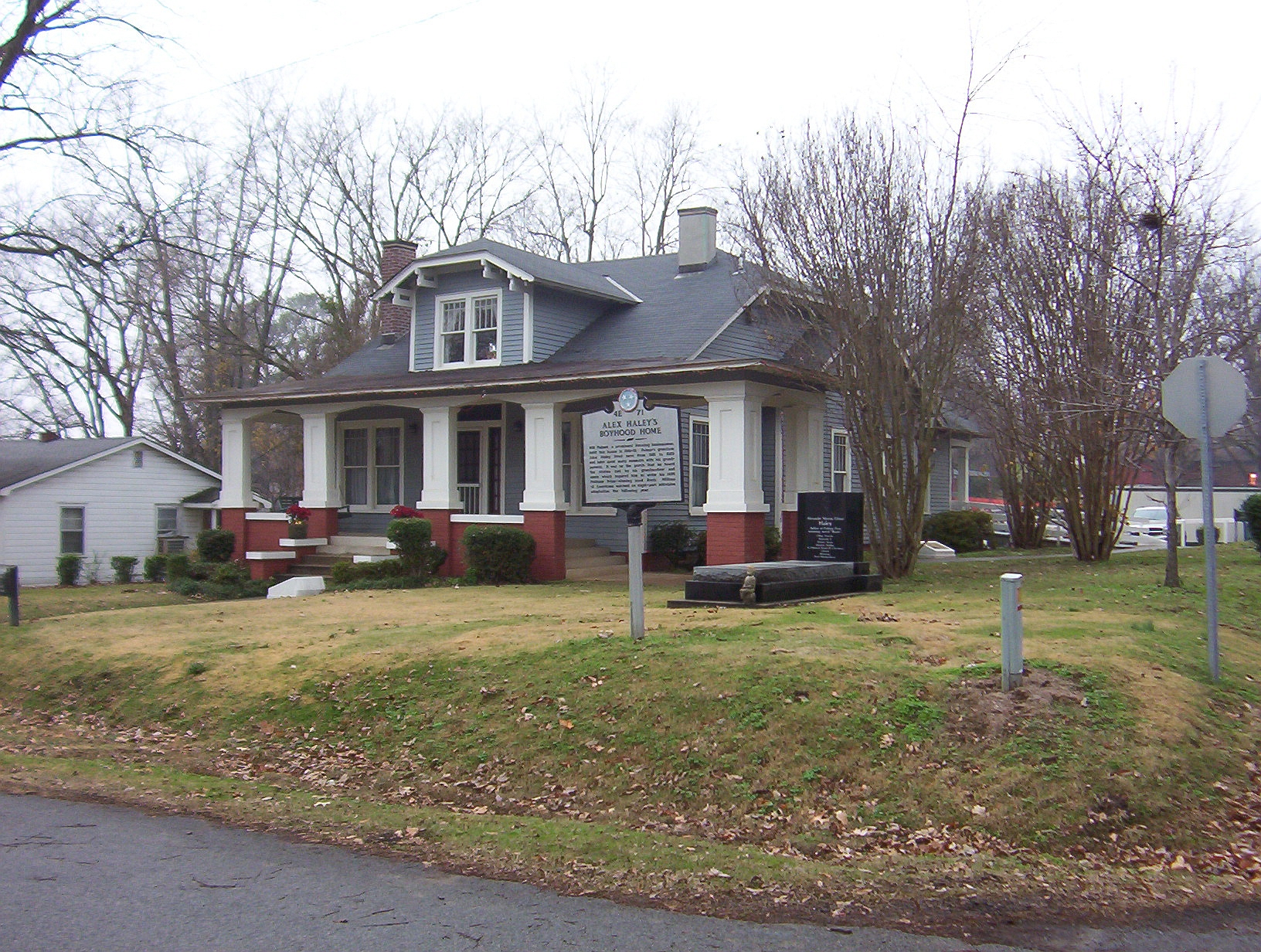
- Alex Haley's boyhood home in Henning, in 2007

- Location within Tennessee Location within the United States
- Location: 200 South Church Street, Henning, Tennessee
- Coordinates: 35°40′24″N 89°34′35″W
- Built: 1918
- Architectural style: Bungalow/Craftsman
- NRHP reference No.: 78002604
- Added to NRHP: December 14, 1978

Alex Haley House and Museum State Historic Site is one of the Tennessee Historical Commission's state-owned historic sites and is located in Henning, Tennessee, United States. It is open to the public and partially funded by an agreement with the Tennessee Historical Commission. It was originally known as W. E. Palmer House and was the boyhood home of author Alex Haley. He was buried on the grounds. The home was listed on the National Register of Historic Places in 1978. In 2010, the site debuted the state-funded Alex Haley Museum and Interpretive Center which features a museum and interpretive center (designed by architect Louis Pounders) with exhibitions covering Haley's life.

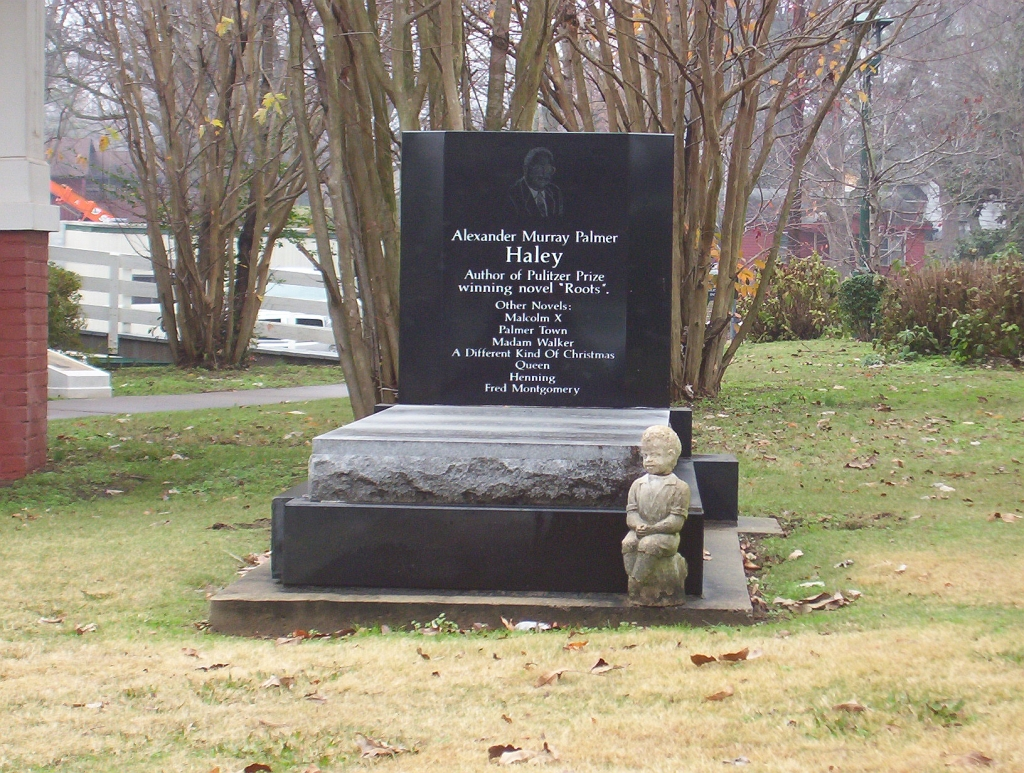
Alex Haley's grave beside his boyhood home in Henning, in 2007
