= Elvis Presley House =

Historic house in Tennessee, United States

- U.S. National Register of Historic Places
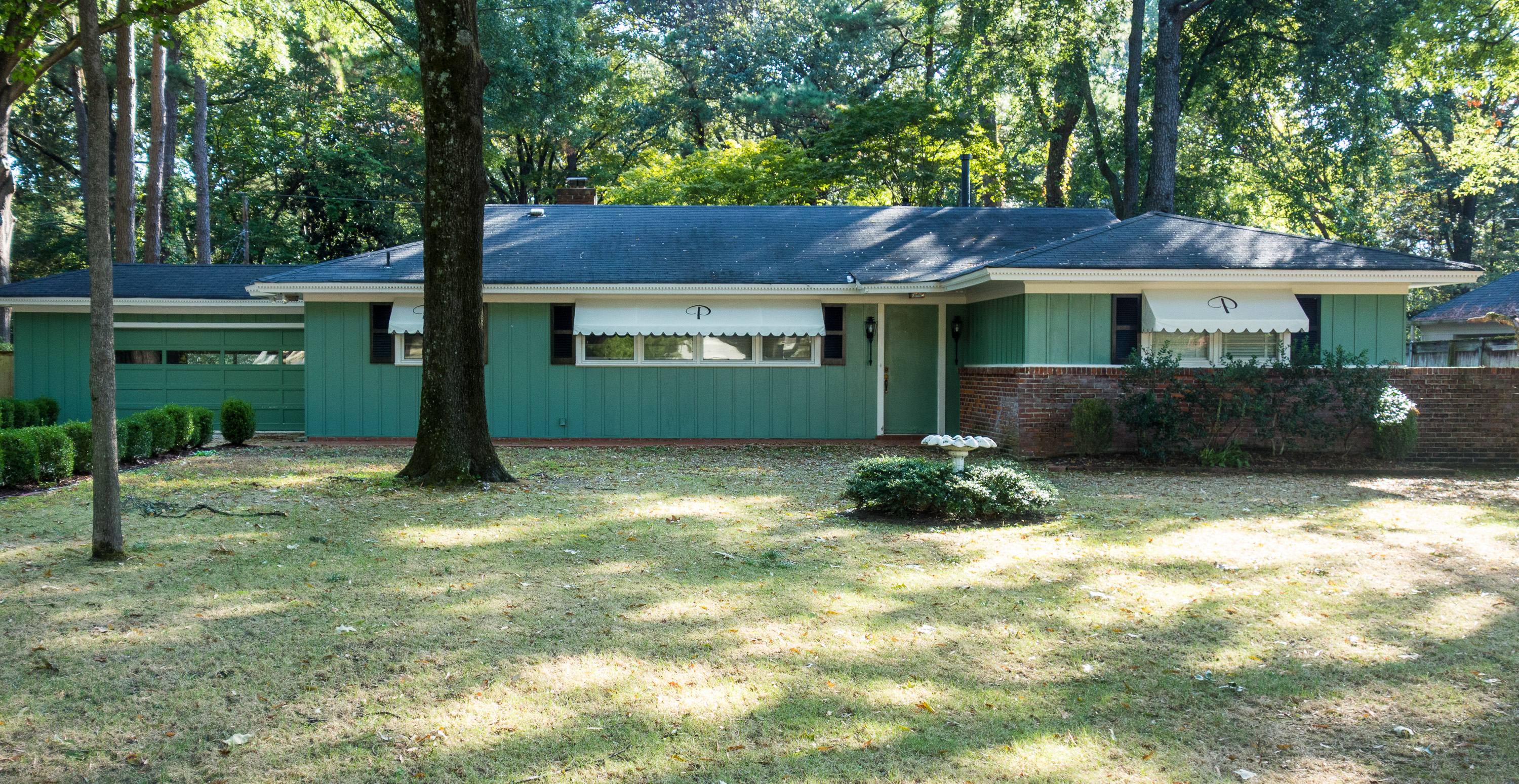
- Location: 1034 Audubon Dr. Memphis TN
- Coordinates: 35°6′12.0378″N 89°55′11.2116″W
- Built: ca. 1954
- Architect: Howard Handwerker
- Architectural style: Ranch
- NRHP reference No.: 05001217
- Added to NRHP: 2006

Elvis Presley House is a one-story ranch style house in a residential neighborhood in Memphis, Tennessee. Singer Elvis Presley lived here with his parents between March 1956 and March 1957, before moving to Graceland.

== About the house ==
The house is a one-story ranch-style house with concrete foundation and two-car attached garage. It is located in a quiet residential neighborhood. It has four bedrooms and two bathrooms. A brick and metal fence was installed by the Presley family. In the backyard is a motorcycle garage. Elvis installed a pool in the backyard in 1956, which was reported to be the largest residential pool in the city at the time. The pool was removed in 2006.

Originally the house was painted green, then white, then green again.

== History ==
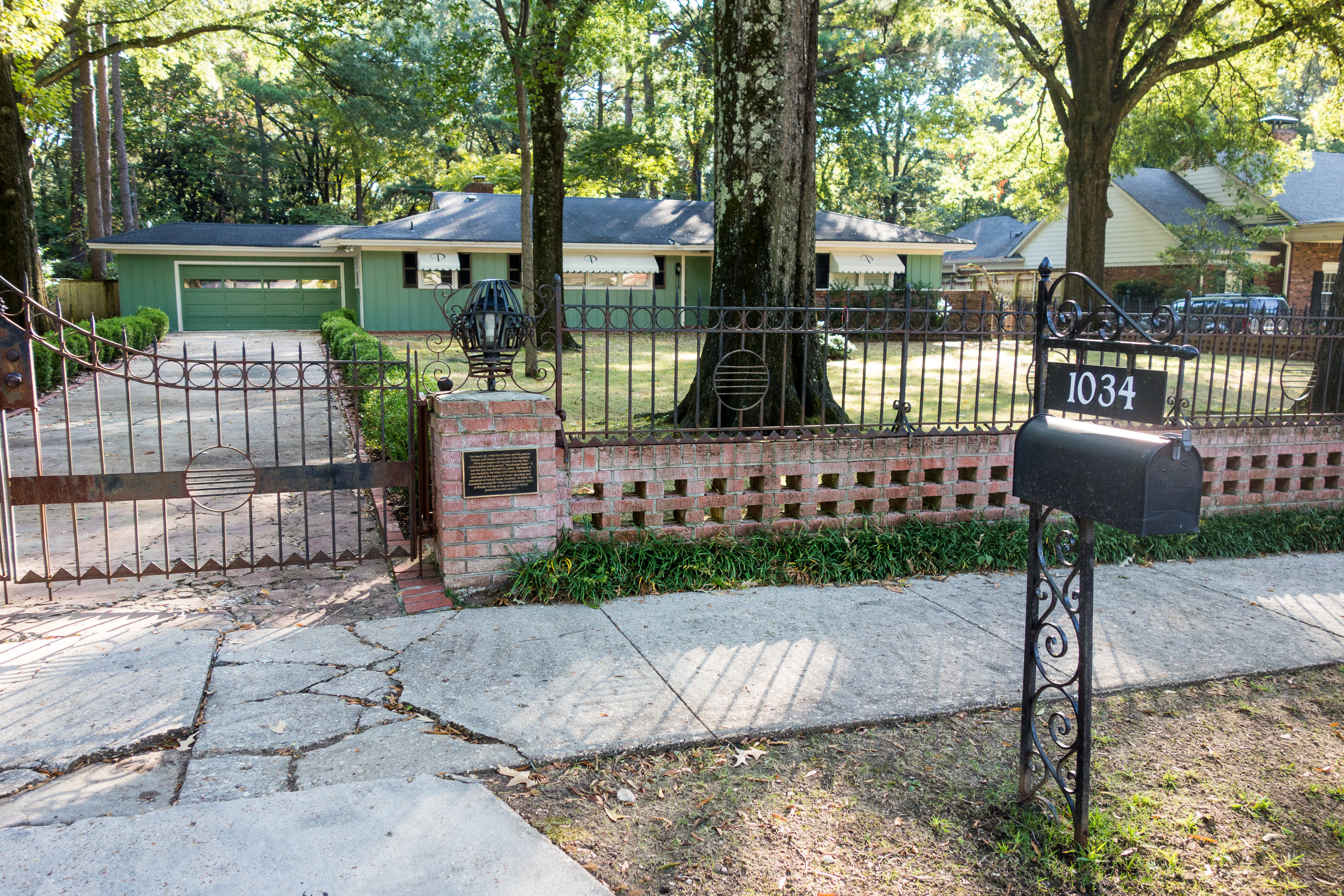
House with mailbox

Elvis purchased the house on March 12, 1956, for $29,500 from the Welsh Plywood Corporation and placed a down-payment of $500 on the house. He was only 21 years old. The new home was not far from his previous residence at 1414 Getwell Road, in what is now a coin operated laundromat.

Shortly after moving there, his song Heartbreak Hotel became the most popular song in the nation (before topping the Billboard charts at #1 in April), and fans mobbed the house, which quickly became a focal visiting point for fans, celebrities and the media. Photos of the house were published in national magazines such as Look, Seventeen, and Parade. Police frequently were called to deal with the mobs of fans who would line the street.

The crush of fans and photographers became too much, and after 13 months Elvis moved to Graceland and sold the Audubon Drive property as part of the mansion and estate's purchase. Elvis and Graceland owner Ruth Moore swapped residences; she moved into the Audubon home as he moved into the mansion-estate. The property has been sold about eight times since.

The house was added to the National Register of Historic Places in March 2006, shortly before its public auction on eBay two months later. Initially, it was reported that 'spoon-bender' Uri Geller won the auction with a bid of $905,100. Instead, the house was sold to record company executive Mike Curb at a reported sale price of $1 million. Curb turned oversight of the property over to the Mike Curb Institute at Rhodes College.

The new owners repainted the house from white to a green color similar to the one when Elvis owned it, renovated the fence, and removed the pool. The house is currently not open to the public, but occasionally hosts small VIP events and private music concerts. In April 2017, the house was damaged by fire while undergoing renovations. Amazingly, most of the contents were undamaged because they were safely secured elsewhere at the time.

== Plaque ==
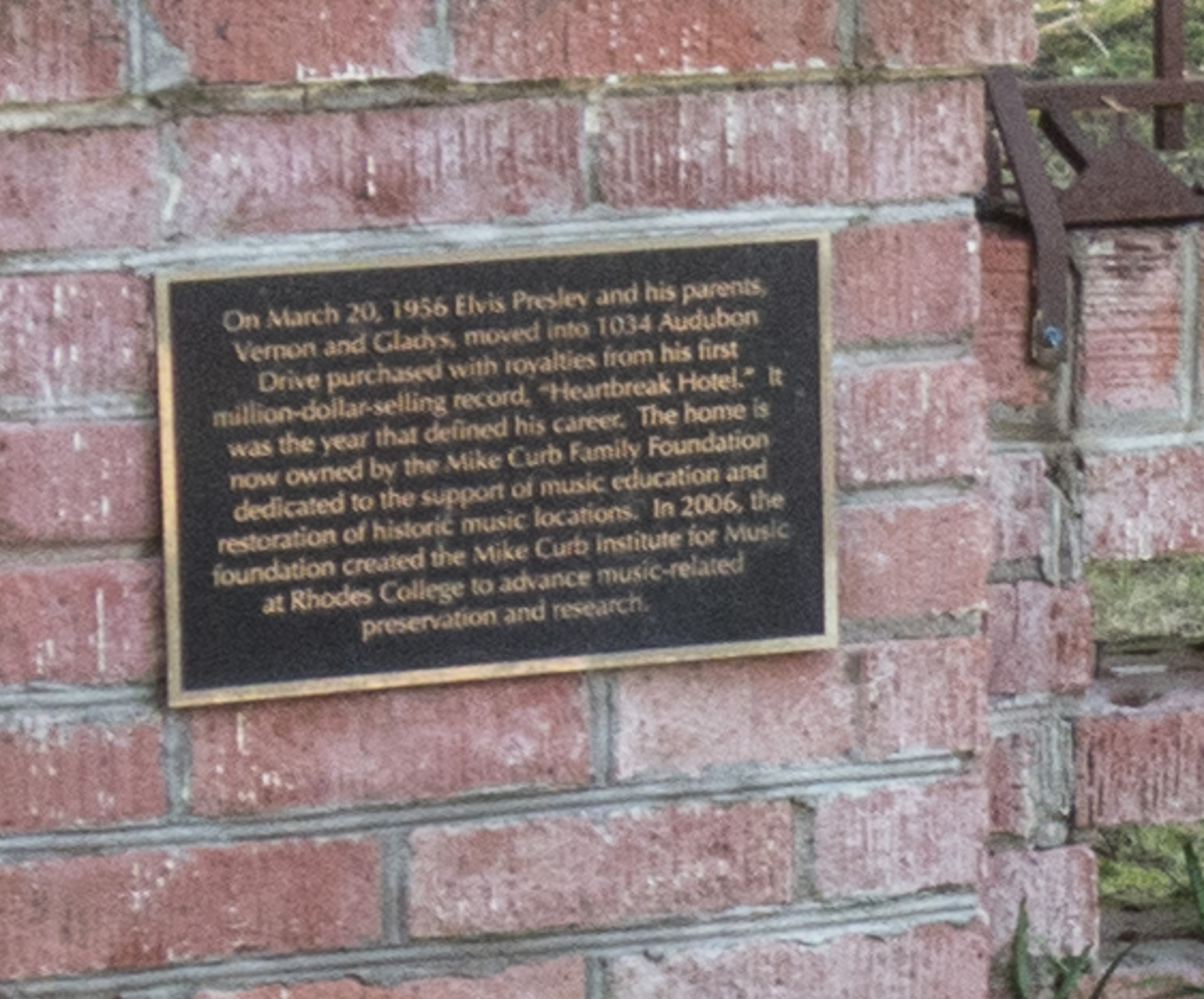

A plaque on the brickwork on the fence reads:

On March 20, 1956 Elvis Presley and his parents, Vernon and Gladys, moved into 1034 Audubon Drive purchased with royalties from his first million-dollar-selling record, "Heartbreak Hotel." It was the year that defined his career. The home is now owned by the Mike Curb Family Foundation dedicated to the support of music education and the restoration of historic music locations. In 2006, the foundation created the Mike Curb Institute for Music at Rhodes College to advance music-related preservation and research.

== See also ==
- National Register of Historic Places listings in Shelby County, Tennessee
