= Marjorie Hass =

Academic, college professor

President of the Council of Independent Colleges
- Incumbent
- Assumed office July 2021

20th President of Rhodes College
- In office July 2017 – June 2021
- Preceded by: William E. Troutt
- Succeeded by: Carroll Stevens (Interim); Jennifer Collins

12th President of Austin College
- In office June 2009 – July 2017
- Preceded by: Oscar C. Page
- Succeeded by: Steven O'Day

Personal details
- Education: University of Illinois at Urbana–Champaign

Marjorie Hass is an American academic who serves as the President of the Council of Independent Colleges. She served as the 20th president of Rhodes College in Memphis, TN from July 2017 to June 2021. She also served as president of Austin College in Sherman, TX from July 2009 to June 2017. Earlier at Muhlenberg College in Allentown, PA, she headed the Center for Ethics.
