= Jennifer Collins =

American legal scholar

21st President of Rhodes College
- Incumbent
- Assumed office July 1, 2022
- Preceded by: Marjorie Hass

Personal details
- Born: 1965 (age 60–61)
- Spouse: Adam Charnes
- Children: 3
- Education: Yale University (BA); Harvard University (JD)

Jennifer M. Collins (born 1965) is an American legal scholar currently serving as the 21st President of Rhodes College. Collins was previously the dean of the Dedman School of Law at Southern Methodist University—the first permanent female dean of that institution.

== Early life and education ==
Collins graduated cum laude with a B.A. in history from Yale University in 1987. She then enrolled at Harvard Law School, graduating magna cum laude with a J.D. in 1991. At Harvard, she was a notes editor for the Harvard Law Review, working under fellow student and law review president Barack Obama.

After graduating from Harvard, Collins clerked for Judge Dorothy Wright Nelson at the U.S. Court of Appeals for the Ninth Circuit.

== Legal career ==
After finishing her clerkship, Collins worked in private practice in Washington D.C. In 1993, she accepted a position as an attorney-adviser for the United States Department of Justice Office of Legal Counsel. A year later, she joined the United States Attorney's Office for the District of Columbia as an Assistant United States Attorney (AUSA). In this role, she tried more than 30 criminal cases, many of them homicides. Two of her cases garnered major media attention. One involved Aundrey Burno, a teenager and convicted murderer who, before sentencing, told an HBO documentary crew that "I would kill again if I have to." Collins used Burno's words to persuade the judge to grant a 70-year sentence. In the other high-profile case, Collins successfully prosecuted serial killer Joseph Mesa Jr.

She remained at the United States Attorney's Office until 2002, returning briefly to private practice at Sidley Austin before transitioning to academia.

== Academic career ==
=== Wake Forest University ===
Collins joined the faculty at Wake Forest School of Law in 2003 to teach criminal law, criminal procedure, family law, and gender and law. She received numerous awards for teaching excellence during her time at Wake Forest, including the 2009 Jurist Excellence in Teaching Award, selected by the graduating law school class, and the 2010 Joseph Branch Excellence in Teaching Award, selected by the dean of the law school. In 2010, Collins joined university administration as associate provost for academic and strategic initiatives. She was promoted to vice provost in 2013. In this capacity, she launched Wake Forest's LGBTQ+ Center and Women's Center.

=== Southern Methodist University ===
In 2014, Collins left Winston-Salem to become Dean of the Dedman School of Law at Southern Methodist University. Collins was the first permanent female dean of SMU's law school. During her eight-year tenure in Dallas, Collins managed a $49 million annual budget, supervised more than 100 faculty, and supported over 800 domestic and international students. She raised more than $50 million for scholarships, endowed chairs and professorships, and new academic and student programming, while launching three new academic centers and opening new legal clinics. Despite a national decline in interest in legal education, she increased the law school's applications every year of her tenure, exceeding national and regional averages, and improved the academic profile of the entering class. Upon her departure in 2022, she was praised for advancing the school's academic quality and diversity.

=== Rhodes College ===
Collins was named the 21st President of Rhodes College in December 2021 and formally began her tenure in July 2022. In office, she has emphasized Rhodes' relationship with the city of Memphis as a defining strength of the college's liberal arts identity, citing student access to internships at major institutions such as St. Jude Children's Research Hospital and the Memphis Zoo. She also oversaw the launch of the Institute for Race and Social Transformation, described as a hub for interdisciplinary research on racial injustice and social inequities in Memphis, and coordinated a community engagement task force in late 2022 to restructure and centralize the college's work with city partners.

== Scholarship ==
Collins's legal scholarship examines the intersection of criminal law and family law, and in particular on how the criminal justice system addresses a defendant's family status. Her research has included scholarship on the prosecution of parents responsible for their children's deaths. Collins was a collaborator of slain Florida State University law professor Dan Markel.

== Personal life ==
Collins is married to Adam Charnes, an appellate attorney. They have three children.
