= Foundation for Independent Higher Education =

- Abbreviation: FIHE
- Formation: 1958; merged in 2010 with The Council of Independent Colleges
- Type: 501(c)(3) Organization
- Purpose: Independent Higher Education
- Location: Washington, DC
- Region served: United States
- Members: State Fund Members
- Executive Director: Ned Moore

The Foundation for Independent Higher Education (FIHE) is the national office for a network of state-based private college fundraising associations in the United States. It was founded in 1958 as the Independent College Funds of America (ICFA). In 2010 it merged into the Council of Independent Colleges. FIHE was created to support the work of the regional fundraising consortia to secure additional financial resources in support of America's independent colleges and universities and their students. FIHE today supports 38 state consortia through member services programs, professional development workshops, collaborative initiatives, and grant programs made possible by gifts from corporations as well as from its own endowment. Based in Washington, DC, FIHE has provided nearly $100 million in grants to and through its member state consortia, and has had a tangible impact on the growth and development of the private college sector in America.

== National impact ==
For over 50 years, FIHE's efforts have been focused on:

- Securing philanthropic support for private colleges and universities, primarily from the corporate sector;
- Developing collaborative programs of mutual interest to donors and institutions in the private college sector;
- Celebrating the unique characteristics and contributions to our nation of our private colleges and universities;
- Strategically linking the corporate and philanthropic objectives of business and industry with the strengths and opportunities provided by a national network of 32 state funds and their nearly 600 member colleges and universities.

Including all state-generated support, direct FIHE grants and its challenge grant components, more than $1.6 billion has been secured for the private college sector for such purposes as budget support, scholarship programs, faculty development, the enhancement of science and mathematics education (see STEM fields), career services program, curriculum development, and minority student educational achievement.

== Programs ==
Among FIHE's current signature programs are:

- National Venture Fund grants, supporting states in innovative collaborative projects benefitting their private colleges;
- FIHE/UPS Scholarship Program, providing over $1.5 million a year in scholarship support for private college students with demonstrated need and academic promise.
- First Opportunity Partners program, enhancing private college access and opportunity for low-income, minority, first generation, and new American students. Its three-fold purpose is to broaden the accessibility to higher education, to strengthen student retention and academic experiences, and to prepare students for the future world of work.

== State Fund Members ==
To help strengthen the nation's private college sector, FIHE works through, and provides financial support for, state-based associations of private colleges and universities.

FIHE's State Partners are:

- Alabama Association of Independent Colleges and Universities (AAICU)
- Arkansas Independent Colleges and Universities (AICU)
- Independent Higher Education of Colorado Fund (IHEC)
- Florida Independent College Fund (FICF)
- Georgia Independent College Association (GICA)
- Associated Colleges of Illinois (ACI)
- Independent Colleges of Indiana (ICI)
- Iowa College Foundation (ICF)
- Kansas Independent College Fund (KICF)
- Association of Independent Kentucky Colleges and Universities (AIKCU)
- Louisiana Independent College Foundation (LAICU)
- Independent College Fund of Maryland (I-Fund)
- Michigan Colleges Foundation (MCF)
- Minnesota Private College Fund (MPCF)
- Missouri Colleges Fund (MCF)
- Nebraska Independent College Foundation (NICF)
- Independent College Fund of New Jersey (ICFNJ)
- New Mexico Independent College Fund (NMICF)
- North Carolina Independent Colleges and Universities (NCICU)
- North Dakota Independent College Fund (NDICF)
- Ohio Foundation of Independent Colleges (OFIC)
- Oklahoma Independent Colleges and Universities (OICU)
- Oregon Alliance of Independent Colleges and Universities (OAICU)
- Association of Independent Colleges and Universities of Pennsylvania (AICUP)
- South Carolina Independent Colleges and Universities (SCICU)
- South Dakota Foundation of Independent Colleges (SDFIC)
- Tennessee Independent Colleges and Universities Association (TICUA)
- Independent Colleges and Universities of Texas Foundation (ICUT)
- Virginia Foundation for Independent Colleges (VFIC)
- Independent Colleges of Washington (ICW)
- West Virginia Independent Colleges and Universities (WVICU)
- Wisconsin Association of Independent Colleges and Universities (WAICU)

== Presidents and executive directors ==
- 1958-67 - Gerald P. Burns
- 1968-73 - Byron K. Trippet
- 1973-75 - William F. Young
- 1975-86 - John A. Logan Jr.
- 1986-88 - John M. Duggan
- 1988-89 - Francis J. Mertz
- 1989-92 - John P. Blessington
- 1992-99 - Carole B. Whitcomb
- 1999-08 - William E. Hamm
- 2008-10 - Myrvin F. Christopherson
- 2010 - - Ned Moore

== Recent merger ==
FIHE recently began a new partnership with the Council of Independent Colleges, a national organization also known for its work in strengthening the private college sector. The two organizations merged in October, 2010. With their programs brought together under one roof, FIHE and CIC are working together to achieve even greater national reach and program synergies to benefit independent higher education.
