= Rhodes Singers =

The Rhodes Singers are a noted undergraduate choir from Rhodes College in Memphis, TN, specializing in smaller, unaccompanied chamber music works. They are directed by Dr. D. Jason Bishop '98.

The Rhodes Singers were established in 1937 as the concert choir for the college by music professor and composer Burnet C. Tuthill, who joined the college faculty in 1935. Tuthill, son of the architect of New York's Carnegie Hall, was a clarinetist who also founded the group that was to become the Memphis Symphony Orchestra. Professor Tuthill established the tradition of the annual choir tour throughout the United States; in 1976, his successor, Professor Tony Lee Garner ’65, led the inaugural international concert tour, bringing sacred music and southern spirituals to Romania in conjunction with Friendship Ambassadors. Professor Garner also created the MasterSingers Chorale in the early 1990s, bringing together alumni and community singers.

Dr. Tim Sharp followed Garner as conductor of Rhodes Singers and the MasterSingers Chorale in 2000. In 2001 Rhodes Singers toured in Italy and Switzerland and were the featured choir at the International Church Music Festival in Bern, Switzerland, directed by Sir David Willcocks. In 2002 the Rhodes Singers were featured with composer Morten Lauridsen in the performance of his "Les Chansons des Roses" with the composer in residence. In 2004 the Rhodes Singers, along with the Rhodes Mastersingers Chorale performed a program of Morten Lauridsen's works at Carnegie Hall in New York City. The concert featured Lauridsen's "Mid-Winter Songs," "Madrigali: Six "Firesongs" on Italian Renaissance Poems," "O Magnum Mysterium," "Les Chanson des Roses," and "Lux Aeterna," with Lauridsen accompanying the Singers on the "Dirait-on" movement of "Les Chanson des Roses." In the Spring of 2006 the Rhodes Singers took their music overseas once again, touring England and performing in such venues as Canterbury Cathedral, Arundel Cathedral, Winchester Cathedral, Christ Church Cathedral, Oxford, St Catharine's College, Cambridge, and St. Paul's Cathedral in London. In the Fall of 2006 the Rhodes Singers returned to Carnegie Hall to perform the Carnegie Hall premiere of Morten Lauridsen's "Nocturnes" and "Lux Aeterna," again with the composer accompanying them at the piano for the "Nocturnes." The Rhodes Singers have several recordings to their credit, most recently recording "Christmas at St. Mary's Vol. V." In 2008, Sharp became Executive Director of the American Choral Directors Association, and was followed a year later by Dr. William Skoog.

Today, the Rhodes Singers perform many concerts annually, tour throughout the United States, and every three years tour internationally.

Rhodes Singers have established a tradition of choral excellence throughout the region. This choir of sixty singers focus on smaller choral works often from the unaccompanied choral tradition. Membership in Rhodes Singers is based upon an audition. One hour college credit is available each semester for performing in Rhodes Singers.
