= Ming Dong Gu =

Chinese-born American literary scholar (born 1955)

Ming Dong Gu (顾明栋; born 1955) is Katherine R. Cecil Professor in the School of Arts, Humanities, and Technology at the University of Texas at Dallas. He is a Chinese-born scholar of comparative literature and thought. He received his doctorate from the University of Chicago and has taught at various US universities and colleges. He has a wide range of scholarly interests covering English literature, Chinese literature, comparative literature, literary theory, comparative thought East and West, fiction theory, hermeneutics, postcolonial studies, psychoanalytic criticism, and cross-cultural studies.

He is the author of 6 monographs, five of which are in English, and editor of 6 volumes in English and Chinese. In addition, he has published more than 160 articles in English and Chinese journals and books. His 71 English articles appear in journals including New Literary History, Poetics Today, Journal of Aesthetics and Art Criticism, Diacritics: A Review of Contemporary Criticism, Postcolonial Studies, Narrative, Journal of Narrative Theory, Psychoanalytic Quarterly, Modern Language Quarterly, Journal of Aesthetic Education (2 articles), D. H. Lawrence Review (two articles), Interdisciplinary Literary Studies: A Journal of Criticism and Theory; Literature and Psychology, Comparative Literature, Comparative Literature Studies (two articles), Canadian Review of Comparative Literature (two articles), Yearbook of Comparative Literature, Philosophy East & West (7 articles), Journal of Chinese Philosophy (4 articles), Asian Philosophy, Dao: A Journal of Comparative Philosophy (2 articles), Philosophy and Literature, Journal of Oriental Studies, Monumenta Serica, International Communications of Chinese Culture (2 articles), Journal of Asian Studies, Chinese Literature: Essays, Articles, Reviews, Translation Review, Tamkang Review (2 articles), Interdisciplinary Studies of Literature, Journal of Modern Literature, and Contemporary Chinese Thought. His 93 Chinese articles appear in China's major journals of humanities and some of them are reprinted in full or in excerpts in China's major digests for more than 40 times. He has also published 24 reviews and short articles in Chinese and English.

Among his publications, Sinologism: An Alternative to Orientalism and Postcolonialism was praised by J. Hillis Miller, the world-renowned critic and theorist: "It is a wonderfully exciting work of scholarship and analysis. The Cultural Unconscious is a major contribution to China-Western Studies and cross-cultural studies. It is a superbly learned and wide-ranging book. Its highly original theoretical paradigm is persuasively cogent. The book will be constructively useful as an alternative to Orientalism and postcolonialism." Fusion of Critical Horizons in Chinese and Western Language, Poetics, Aesthetics has won enthusiastic endorsement from eminent scholars from Harvard University, Connell University, and University of Michigan. Jonathan Culler, Class of 1916 Professor of English and Comparative Literature at Cornell writes: "In this ambitious study, which should prove central to further work on these topics, Ming Dong Gu challenges the notion of a fundamental opposition between Western and Chinese aesthetics and undertakes a comparative study of a series of important issues in literary aesthetics, illuminating similarities and differences." His most recent monograph The Nature and Rationale of Zen/Chan and Enlightenment: The Mind of a Prenatal Baby is regarded by the eminent comparative philosopher Roger T. Ames as a "revolutionary tour-de-force in which the prenatal mind takes us back to a distinctively Chinese understanding of the ground of all philosophy and religion."

== Major publications ==
- Books authored:
- (1) Fusion of Critical Horizons in Chinese and Western Language, Poetics, Aesthetics（New York and London: Palgrave Macmillan, 2021, pp. 369.
- (2) Sinologism: An Alternative to Orientalism and Post-colonialism (London and New York: Routledge, 2013), pp. 269. (Chinese translation published by the Commercial Press 商务印书馆, 2015.)
- (3) Chinese Theories of Fiction: A Non-Western Narrative System (Albany, NY: State University of New York Press, 2006). pp. 286. (Chinese translation by the Nanjing University Press 2022)
- (4) Chinese Theories of Reading and Writing: A Route to Hermeneutics and Open Poetics (Albany, NY: State University of New York Press, 2005). pp. 334. (Chinese translation by the Commercial Press 商务印书馆 2021)
- (5) 原创的焦虑：语言、文学、文化研究的多元途径 (Anxiety of Originality: Multiple Approaches to Language, Literature, and Cultural Studies) (Nanjing: Nanjing University Press, 2009). pp. 331.
- (6) The Nature and Rationale of Zen/Chan and Enlightenment: The Mind of a Prenatal Baby (London and New York: Routledge Press 2023)
- Edited Volumes:
- (1) Translating China for Western Readers: Reflective, Critical, Practical Essays (with Rainer Schulte) (Albany, NY: State University of New York Press, 2014), pp. 329.
- (2) Why Traditional Chinese Philosophy Still Matters: The Relevance of Ancient Wisdom for the Global Age (Routledge Press, 2018), pp. 238.
- (3) Sinologism and New Sinology: Discussions and Debates on China-West Studies (co-editor), Contemporary Chinese Thought, no. 1 (2018): 1-81.
- (4) Routledge Handbook of Modern Chinese Literature (London and New York: Routledge, 2019), pp. 768.
- (5) 诺贝尔获奖作家谈创作 (The Nobel Prize Winners of Literature on Literary Creation) (co-editor) (Beijing: Peking University Press, 1987). pp. 512.
- (6) 汉学主义论争集萃 (Collected Essays on the Critical Inquiry of Sinologism) (co-editor) (Beijing: China Social Science Press, 2017), pp. 332.
