= Council of Independent Colleges =

American association

Council of Independent Colleges (CIC)
- Formation: 1956
- Type: Membership organization
- Headquarters: Washington, D.C.
- Location: United States
- Members: Over 700
- President: Marjorie Hass
- Website: cic.edu

The Council of Independent Colleges (CIC) is a membership organization in the United States of more than 700 independent, liberal arts colleges and universities and higher education affiliates and organizations. Member institutions represent the spectrum of independent higher education, including selective liberal arts colleges, private universities, religious colleges, historically black colleges, and single-sex institutions. The council is headquartered at One Dupont Circle in Washington, DC.

Since 2021, the organization has been led by Marjorie Hass..

== Membership criteria ==
To join the council as an institutional member, a college or university must be a nonprofit with 501(c)(3) IRS status, grant baccalaureate degrees, must demonstrate a commitment to liberal arts and sciences through its curricular offerings and degree requirements, must have been in operation for at least three years, and must be accredited or have candidate status with a national or regional accrediting association. Similar institutions outside the U.S. may join as international members, and independent, nonprofit two-year institutions may qualify for associate membership. There is also an affiliate membership category for nonprofit educational associations and organizations that serve independent colleges and universities. In 2026, the CIC board of directors voted to add a sixth membership category for independent, graduate-only, degree-granting institutions demonstrating a commitment to the liberal arts.

== CIC's Tuition Exchange Program ==
One of CIC's free benefits to its member institutions is its Tuition Exchange Program, a network of hundreds of CIC colleges and universities that are willing to accept, tuition-free, students from families of full-time employees of other participating institutions. In 2026, CIC announced a partnership with the Tuition Exchange to simplify the application process. The Tuition Exchange provides an updated list of participating CIC institutions.

== Merger with Foundation for Independent Higher Education ==
In October 2010, the Foundation for Independent Higher Education (FIHE) merged with CIC. This merger has enabled CIC to expand its role in supporting independent colleges by also working with, and providing grant support to, state consortia of private colleges and universities.
