= Marcus Pohlmann =

- Born: September 18, 1950 (age 75); Davenport, Iowa
- Education: Cornell College; Columbia University

Marcus Dale Pohlmann (born 1950) is an American political scientist, author, and professor. His research focuses primarily on American government and politics, specifically, African-American politics, urban politics, and political economy. He is an emeritus professor of political science at Rhodes College in Memphis, Tennessee.

== Career ==
Pohlmann has taught at Bates College, Yerevan State University (as a Fulbright Senior Lecturer), The College of Wooster, Arkansas State University, and Rhodes College. He began his tenure at Rhodes in 1986 and served as chair of the school's Department of Political Science for 16 years. Pohlmann was awarded the Rhodes College Clarence Day Award for Research, the Clarence Day Award for Teaching, and the Jameson Jones Award for Service. He has been published in Political Science Quarterly, The Journal of Politics, New Political Science, Journal of Urban Affairs, Urban Affairs Review, The Journal of Sociology and Social Welfare, Presidential Studies Quarterly, and National Forum.

=== Mock trial ===
Pohlmann is an accomplished mock trial coach. He founded the mock trial program at Rhodes in 1986 and led the program until his retirement in 2018. Under his leadership, Rhodes won the American Mock Trial Association National Championship four times and finished as runners-up four times. Pohlmann was awarded the Neal Smith Award in 2005, was inducted into the AMTA Coaches Hall of Fame in 2006, and served as AMTA president from 2006 to 2008.

=== Publications ===
- Opportunity Lost: Race and Poverty in the Memphis City Schools (Knoxville: University of Tennessee Press, 2008)
- Black Politics in Conservative America (New York, N.Y.: Sloan Publishing, 1990, 1999, 2007)
- African American Political Thought, 6 volumes (New York: Routledge Press, 2003)
- Landmark Congressional Laws on Civil Rights (Westport, Conn.: Greenwood Press, 2002)
- Racial Politics at the Crossroads: Memphis Elects Dr. W. W. Herenton (Knoxville: University of Tennessee Press, 1996)
- Governing the Postindustrial City (White Plains, N.Y.: Longman Press, 1993)
- Political Power in the Postindustrial City (New York: Stonehill Press, 1986)
