= First Presbyterian Church (Memphis, Tennessee) =

Historic church in Tennessee, United States

- U.S. National Register of Historic Places
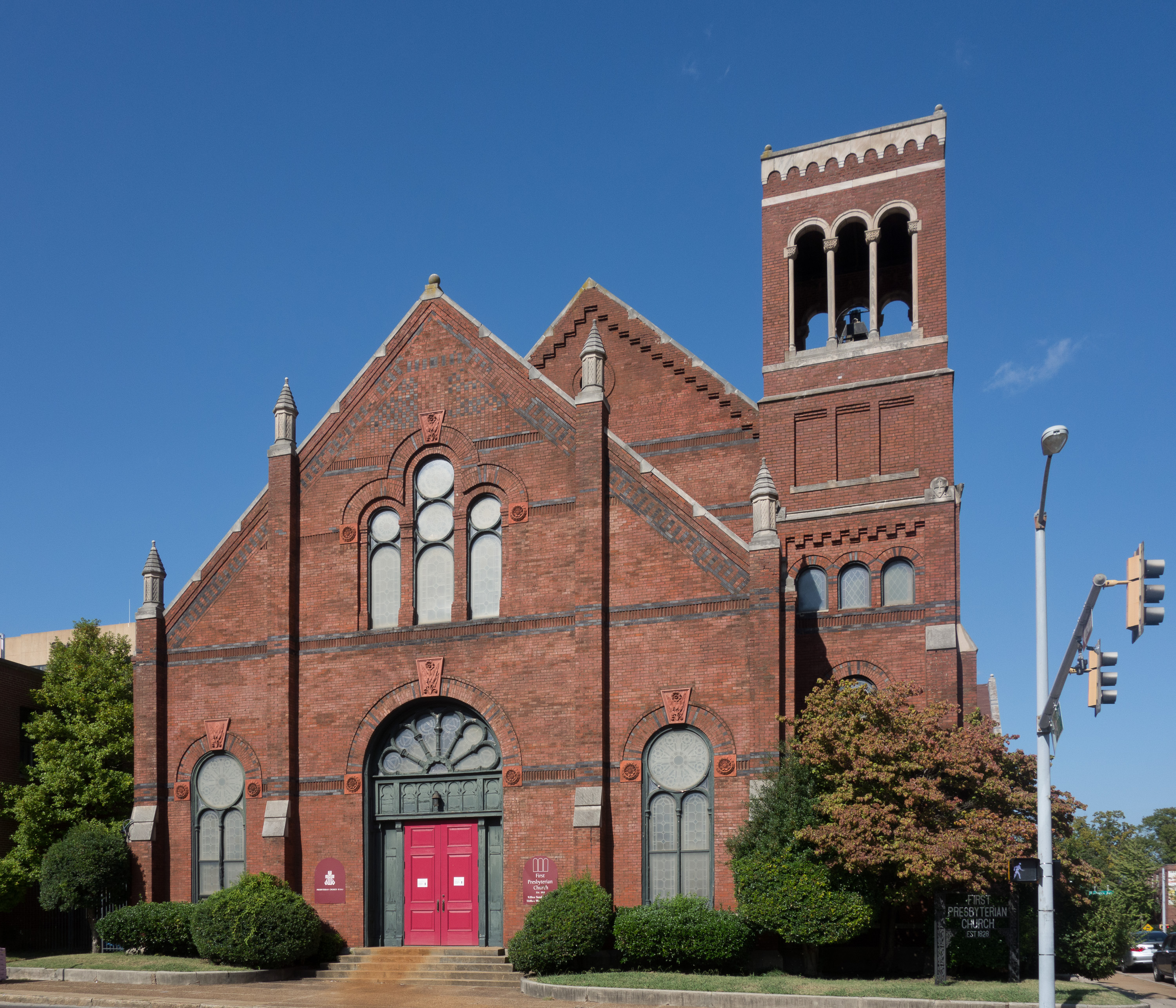

- Location within Tennessee Location within the United States
- Location: 166 Poplar Ave. Memphis, Tennessee
- Coordinates: 35.14988°N 90.04847°W
- Area: less than one acre
- Architect: Edward Culliatt Jones
- Architectural style: Romanesque
- MPS: Religious Resources of Memphis, Shelby County, TN MPS
- NRHP reference No.: 05000183
- Added to NRHP: March 15, 2005

In 1832, the city of Memphis, Tennessee deeded the church a site at the corner of Poplar Avenue and Third Street (now called B.B. King). The present building was built in 1884 and was designed by architect Edward Culliatt Jones and is listed on the National Register of Historic Places.

== See also ==
- National Register of Historic Places listings in Shelby County, Tennessee
