= Gregg House =

Gregg House may refer to:

- Gregg House (Fayetteville, Arkansas), listed on the National Register of Historic Places in Washington County
- Gregg House (Newport, Arkansas), listed on the National Register of Historic Places in Jackson County, Arkansas
- Edward M. Gregg Farm, Jerome, Idaho, listed on the National Register of Historic Places in Jerome County
- William L. Gregg House, Westmont, Illinois, listed on the NRHP in DuPage County, Illinois
- Sturgeon-Gregg House, Simpsonville, Kentucky, listed on the National Register of Historic Places in Shelby County, Kentucky
- Gregg-Moses House, Kalispell, Montana, listed on the National Register of Historic Places in Flathead County, Montana
- Gregg House (Wellington, Ohio), listed on the National Register of Historic Places in Lorain County, Ohio
- Andrew Gregg Homestead, Centre Hall, Pennsylvania, listed on the National Register of Historic Places in Centre County
- Joseph Gregg House, Kennett Square, Pennsylvania, listed on the National Register of Historic Places in Centre County
- Gregg House (Chatham University), Pennsylvania
- Gregg-Wallace Farm Tenant House, Mars Bluff, South Carolina, listed on the National Register of Historic Places in Florence County, South Carolina
- Slave Houses, Gregg Plantation, Mars Bluff, South Carolina, listed on the National Register of Historic Places in Florence County, South Carolina
- Boyce-Gregg House, Memphis, Tennessee, listed on the National Register of Historic Places in Shelby County, Tennessee
