= Memphis Press-Scimitar =

Newspaper based in Memphis, Tennessee

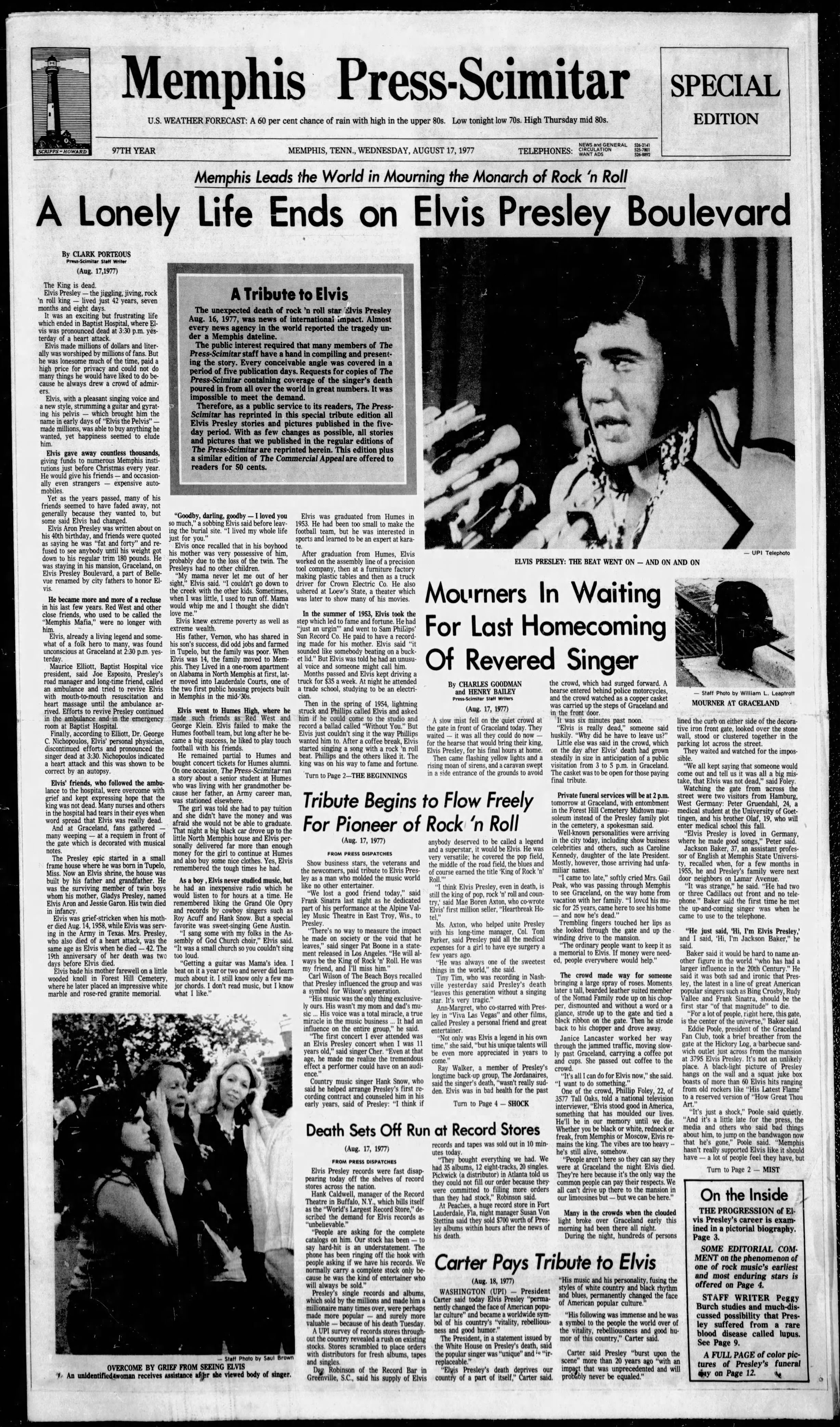
- The front page of a special edition of the Press-Scimitar on August 17, 1977, to mark the death of Elvis Presley
- Type: Daily newspaper
- Format: Broadsheet
- Owner: E. W. Scripps Company
- Editor: Ross B. Young
- Founded: 1926; 100 years ago
- Ceased publication: 1983
- Headquarters: Memphis, Tennessee, USA

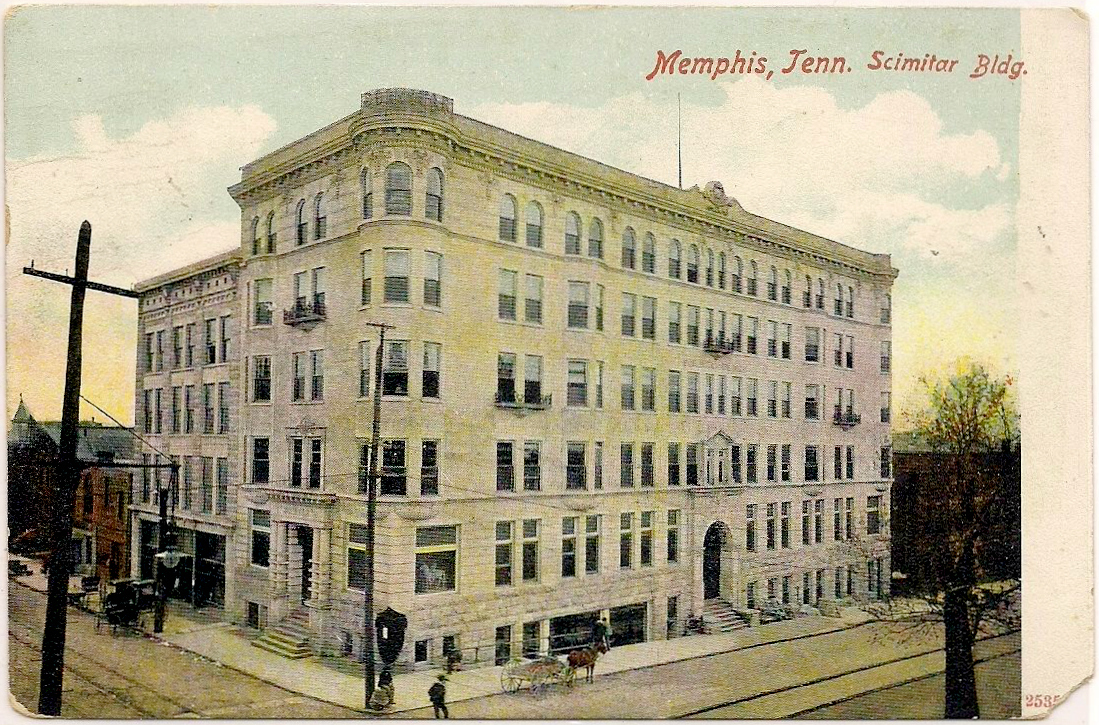
The Scimitar Building was the home of the Memphis Scimitar from 1902 to 1929.

The Memphis Press-Scimitar was an afternoon newspaper based in Memphis, Tennessee, United States, and owned by the E. W. Scripps Company. Created from a merger in 1926 between the Memphis Press and the Memphis News-Scimitar, the newspaper ceased publication in 1983. It was the main rival to The Commercial Appeal, also based in Memphis and owned by Scripps. At the time of its closure, the Press-Scimitar had lost a third of its circulation in 10 years and was down to daily sales of 80,000 copies.

From 1906 to 1931, The Memphis Press was edited by founder Ross B. Young, a journalist from Ohio brought down by local business interests looking for a voice to speak to the stranglehold that E. H. "Boss" Crump had on city government, employment, and contracts. From 1931 to 1962, The Press-Scimitar was edited by Edward J. Meeman.

== History ==
The Memphis Evening Scimitar was published from at least 1891 to 1904 when it merged with the Memphis Morning News. It was also published as the News Scimitar.

It was partly owned by Memphis merchant tycoon Napoleon Hill who commissioned the Scimitar Building in 1902. Memphis architects August A. Chigazola (1869-1911) and William J. Hanker (1876–1958) designed it. Hill, known as Memphis' original "merchant prince", lived on the other side of Madison Avenue in a mansion on the site where the Sterick Building is now. Hill's initials are etched into the façade of the building.

The paper condemned U.S. president Theodore Roosevelt's 1901 dinner with Booker T. Washington.

== In fiction ==
In John Grisham's novel The Client, the Memphis Press is fictionally presented as still existing and flourishing as a major Memphis paper into the 1990s.

In the 2004 movie The Ladykillers, during the basement scene where Tom Hanks's character Professor Goldthwaite Higginson Dorr describes forming the crew for the heist, he references having posted an ad in the Memphis Scimitar, which the would-be thieves responded to.

The 2013 Newberry Award-winning novel Paperboy by former Press Scimitar copy editor Vilas Vince Vawter has its main character working as a paper carrier delivering the Press Scimitar. A second novel, Copyboy, published in 2018, has the same character working as a copyboy in the paper's newsroom.

== See also ==
- List of newspapers in Tennessee
