= Walk Claridge Jones Sr. =

American architect

- Born: c. 1875
- Died: March 20, 1964
- Occupation: Architect

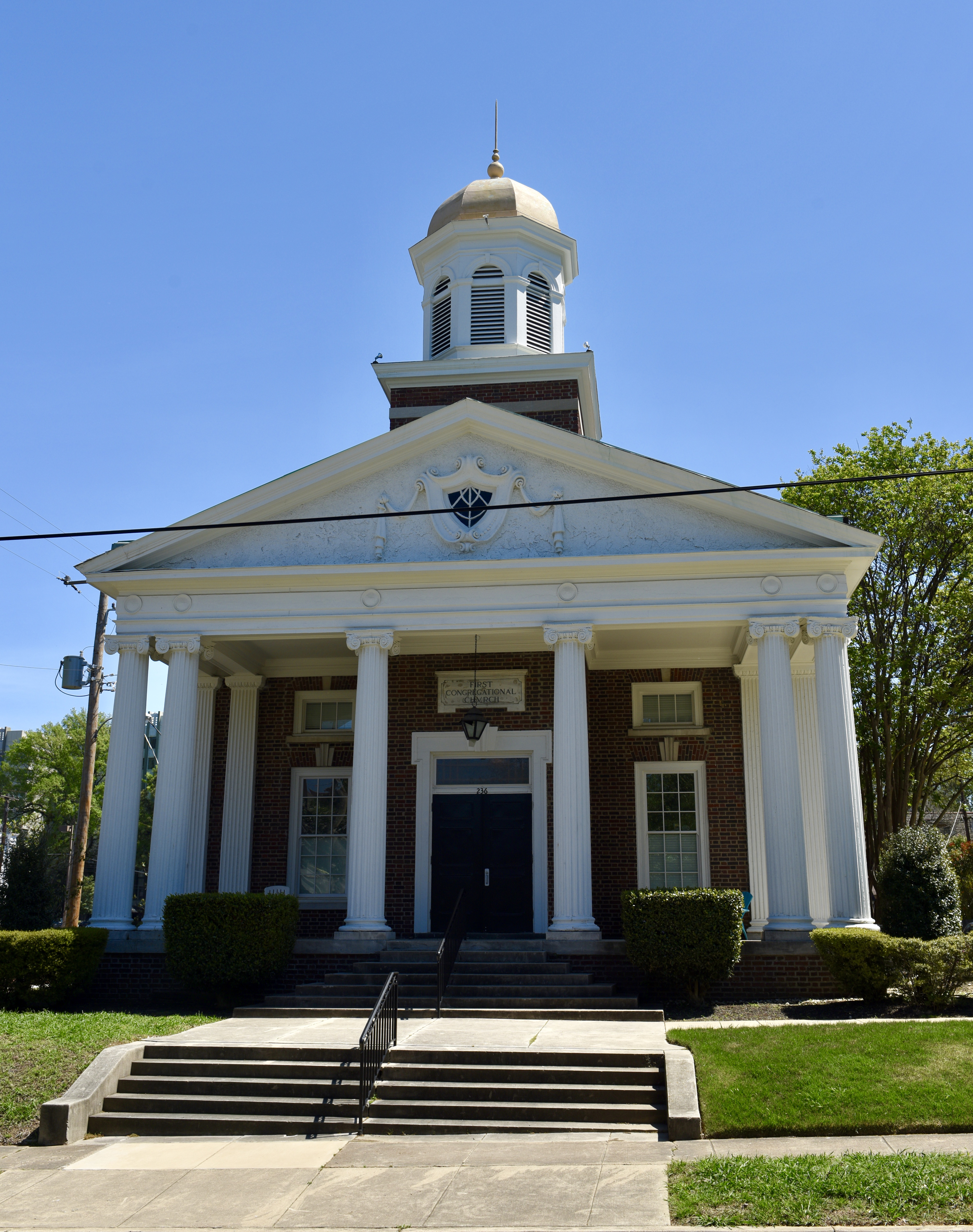
The First Congregational Church and Parish House, designed by Jones.

Walk Claridge Jones Sr. (c. 1875 – March 20, 1964) was an American architect based in Memphis, Tennessee. He designed buildings listed on the National Register of Historic Places like the First Congregational Church and Parish House and the Pauline Cheek Barton House. He co-founded Jones & Furbringer with Max H. Furbringer, and they designed many more buildings, including the NRHP-listed Hotel Claridge.
