= Shrine Building =

Shrine Building may refer to:

- Shrine Building (Miami, Florida), listed on the National Register of Historic Places in Miami-Dade County, Florida
- Shrine Building (Memphis, Tennessee), listed on the National Register of Historic Places in Shelby County, Tennessee
