= Peabody Hotel =

Hotel in Memphis, Tennessee, United States

The Peabody Memphis
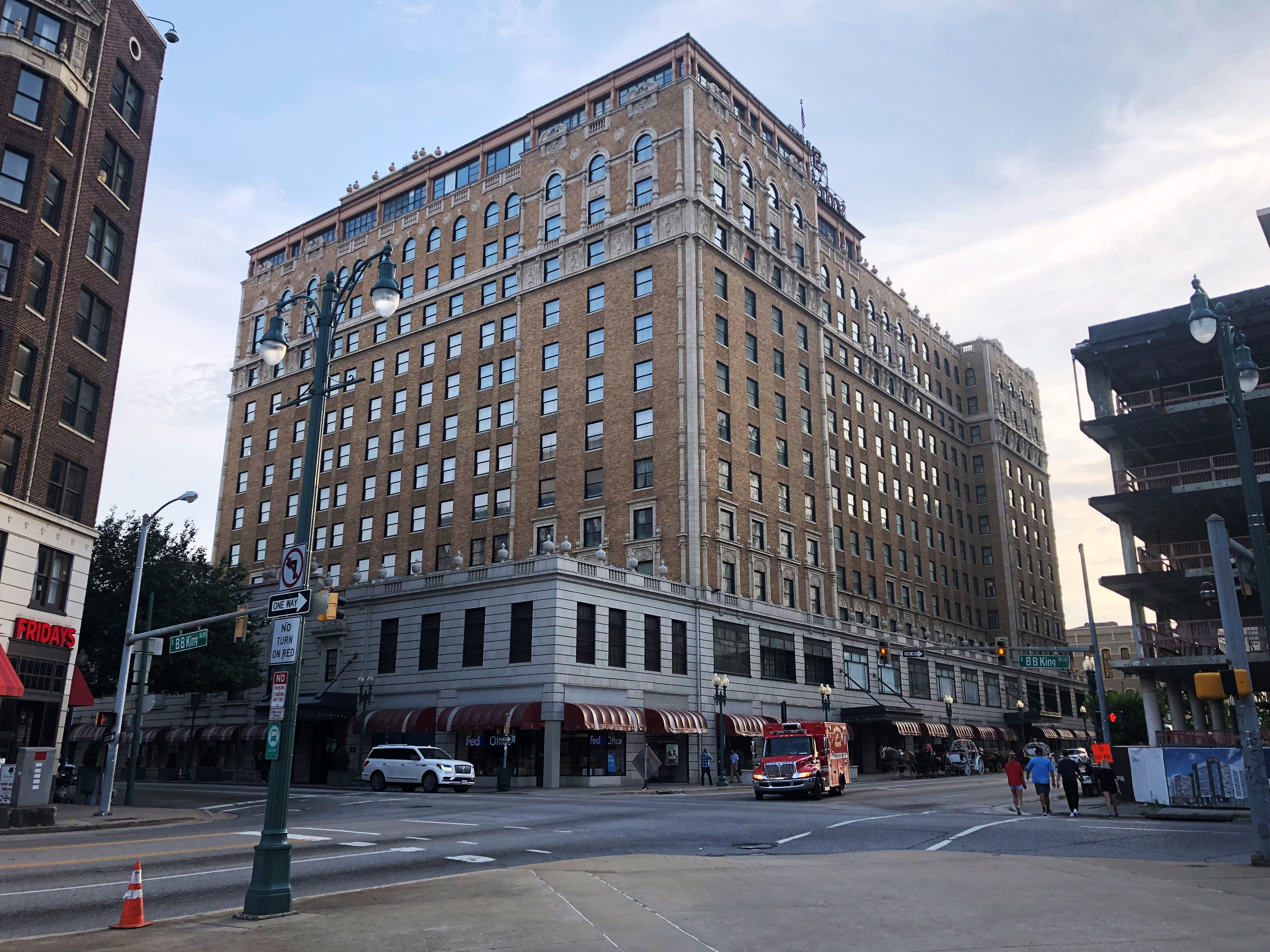
- The Peabody Memphis in 2018

General information
- Architectural style: Italian Renaissance
- Location: 149 Union Ave., Memphis, Tennessee, United States
- Opened: September 1, 1925
- Owner: Peabody Hotel Group

Technical details
- Floor count: 13
- Floor area: 80,000 square feet (7,432.2 m^{2})

Design and construction
- Architect: Walter W. Ahlschlager

Other information
- Number of rooms: 464
- Number of suites: 69
- Number of restaurants: 7
- Parking: 1000+
- Public transit: MATA; Main Street; Madison Avenue

Website
- Official website
- Peabody Hotel
- U.S. National Register of Historic Places
- NRHP reference No.: 77001290
- Added to NRHP: September 14, 1977

The Peabody Memphis is a historic luxury hotel in Downtown Memphis, Tennessee, opened in 1925. The hotel is known for the "Peabody Ducks" that live on the hotel rooftop and make daily treks to the lobby. The Peabody is a member of Historic Hotels of America, a program of the National Trust for Historic Preservation.

== History ==
=== 1869 building ===
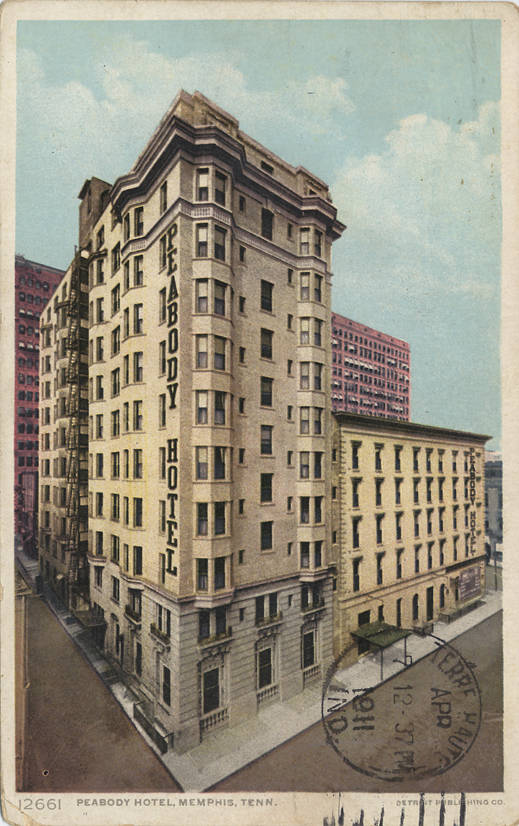
The first Peabody Hotel, circa 1898

The original Peabody Hotel was built in 1869 at the corner of Main and Monroe Streets by Robert Campbell Brinkley, who named it to honor his friend, the recently deceased George Peabody, for his contributions to the South. The hotel was a huge success, and Brinkley gave it to his daughter Anna Overton Brinkley and her husband Robert B. Snowden as a wedding gift not long after it opened. The hotel had 75 rooms, with private bathrooms, and numerous elegant public rooms.

Among its guests were Presidents Andrew Johnson and William McKinley and Confederate Generals Robert E. Lee and Nathan Bedford Forrest. Jefferson Davis, the former President of the Confederacy, lived there in 1870 when he worked as president of an insurance company. The hotel closed in 1923 in preparation for a move one block away. The building was demolished and Lowenstein's department store was constructed there.

=== 1925 building ===
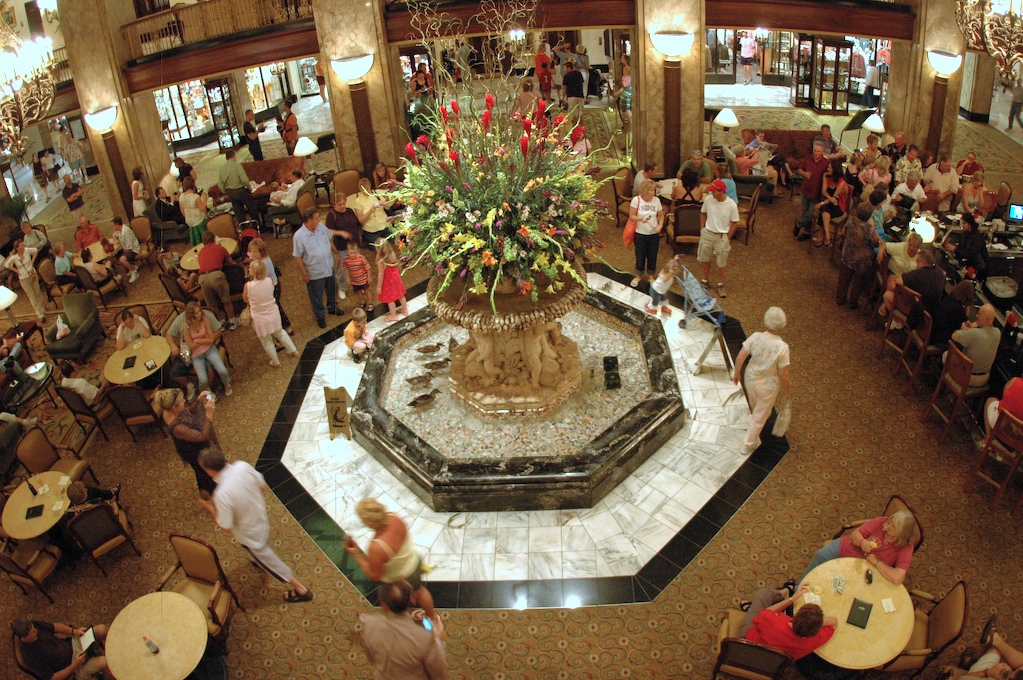
Peabody Hotel lobby, 2006

The current Peabody Hotel building, on Union Avenue, is an Italian Renaissance structure designed by noted Chicago architect Walter W. Ahlschlager. Construction began less than a month after the old hotel closed. The new hotel was built on the previous site of the Fransioli Hotel, a structure which looked nearly identical to the original Peabody Hotel. The new hotel opened on September 1, 1925.

Louis Armstrong and his Orchestra performed at the Peabody Hotel in October 1931. He notably dedicated the song "I'll Be Glad When You're Dead You Rascal You" to the Memphis Police Department as a result of his arrest the night before for sitting next to his manager's white wife on a charter bus.

The studios of radio station WREC and later its television spinoff WREC-TV (now WREG) were for many years located in the hotel basement. During the Big Band era, the Skyway was a popular night-spot, and the ballroom was one of only a handful of sites in America from which the CBS radio network would broadcast live weekly programs. Regular headliners included Tommy Dorsey and the Andrews Sisters

Before the mid-1960s, alcoholic beverages were sold in Tennessee only as sealed bottles in licensed liquor stores. A patron could bring a bottle acquired elsewhere into the hotel bar, The Creel, where the bartender would tag it and mix drinks from it at the patron's request.

The hotel was sold to the Alsonett Hotel Group in 1953. Deeply in debt by the early 1960s, it went bankrupt in 1965 and was sold in a foreclosure auction to Sheraton Hotels, becoming the Sheraton-Peabody Hotel.

As downtown Memphis decayed in the early 1970s, the hotel suffered financially, and the Sheraton-Peabody closed in December 1973. An Alabama investment group purchased the hotel in 1974 and reopened it briefly under its original name, but they declared bankruptcy on April 1, 1975, and it closed again. Isadore Edwin Hanover purchased the hotel from the county on July 31, 1975, for $400,000 and sold it to his son-in-law, Jack A. Belz, for the same amount. Belz spent the next several years and $25 million renovating the landmark structure. The grand reopening in 1981 is widely considered a major catalyst for the Memphis downtown area's ongoing revitalization.

The Peabody Hotel is listed on the National Register of Historic Places.

== Peabody Hotel Group ==
The Peabody Hotel Group (PHG) operated two additional properties under the Peabody name for many years.

The Peabody Orlando, near Orlando, Florida, opened in 1986 as the second Peabody Hotel. It was sold on August 28, 2013 and was renamed Hyatt Regency Orlando on October 1, 2013.

PHG operated a third hotel in Little Rock, Arkansas beginning in 2002, when they assumed management of the former Excelsior Hotel. The hotel was renamed The Peabody Little Rock, and operated under that name until 2013, when it became a Marriott.

PHG also operated properties for a number of years under the Hilton name in Greenville, South Carolina and Little Rock, Arkansas.

== Peabody Ducks ==
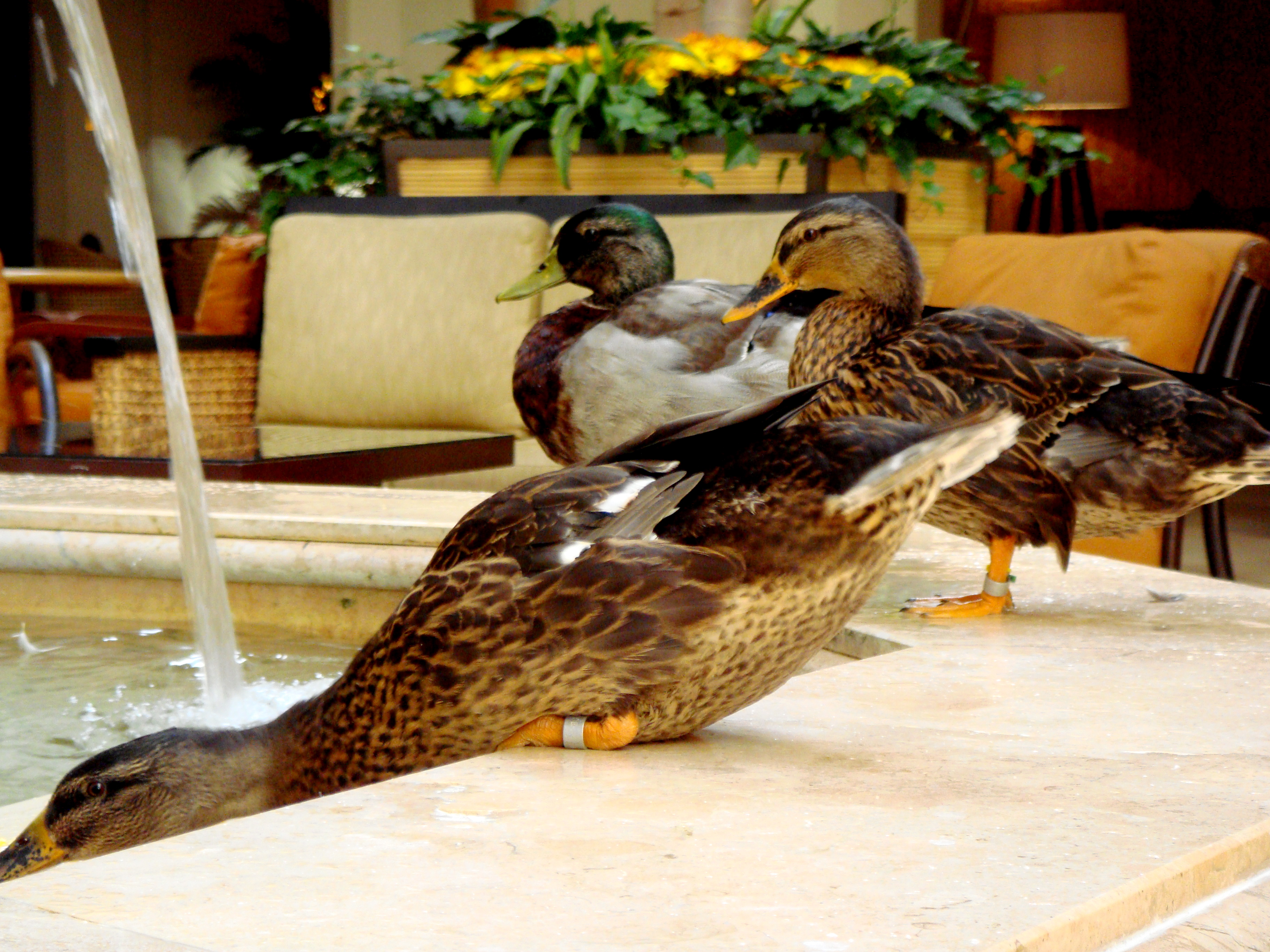
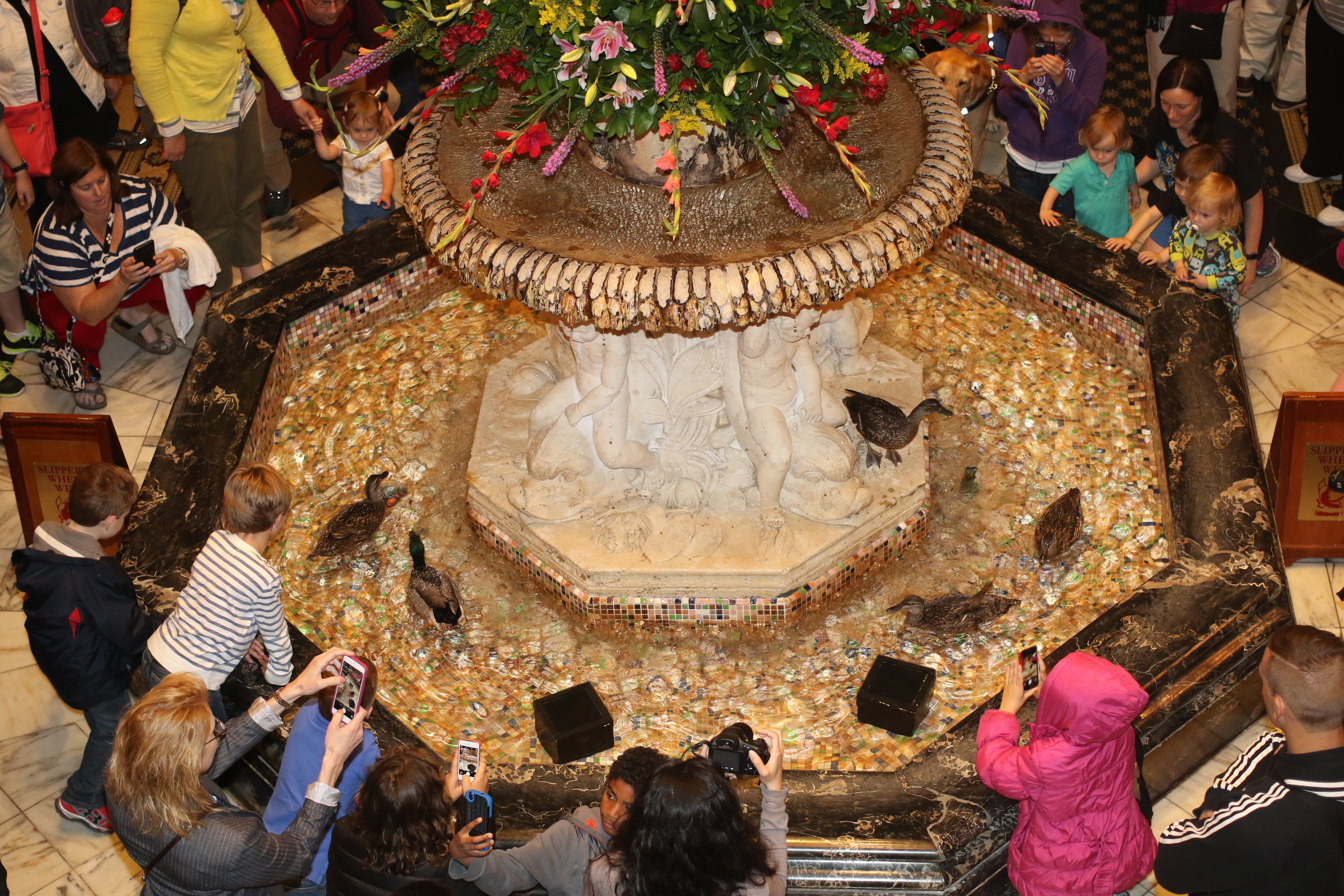
The Peabody Ducks in the Fountain

The Peabody is known for a custom dating back to the 1930s. The General Manager of the time, Frank Schutt, had just returned from a weekend hunting trip in Arkansas. He and his friends found it amusing to leave three of their live English call ducks in the hotel fountain. The guests loved the idea, and since then, five Mallard ducks (one drake and four hens) have played in the fountain every day.

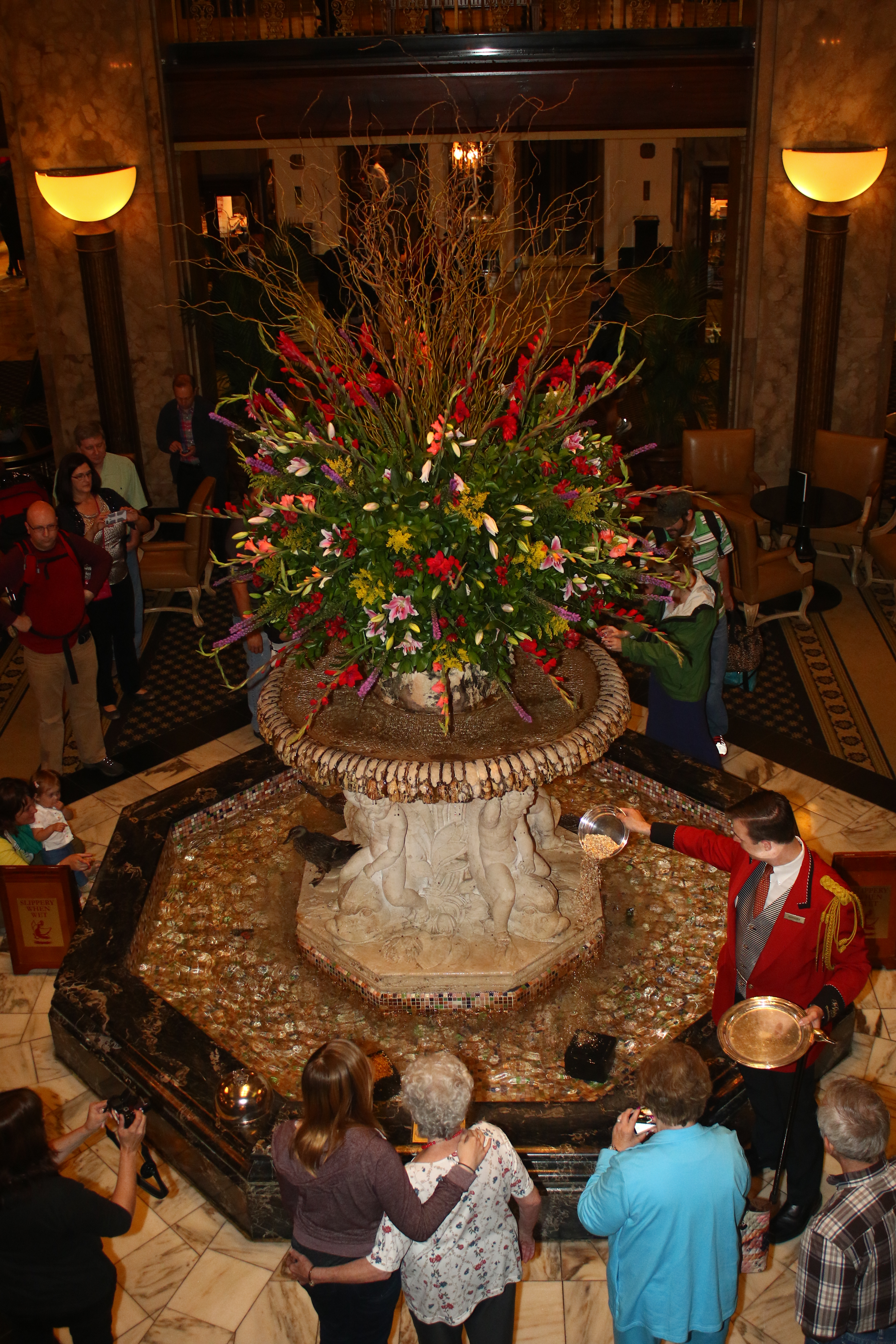
Duckmaster giving the ducks a feeding

In 1940, a bellman by the name of Edward Pembroke volunteered to care for the ducks. Pembroke was given the position of "Duckmaster" and served in that position until 1991. As a former circus animal trainer, he taught the ducks to march into the hotel lobby, which started the famous Peabody Duck March. Every day at 11:00 a.m., the Peabody Ducks are escorted from their penthouse home, on the Rooftop, to the lobby via elevator. The ducks, accompanied by the King Cotton march by John Philip Sousa, then proceed across a red carpet to the hotel fountain, made of a solid block of Italian travertine marble. The ducks are then ceremoniously led back to their penthouse at 5:00 p.m.

Over the years, The Peabody Ducks have gained celebrity status with television appearances (along with their Duckmaster) on The Tonight Show Starring Johnny Carson, Sesame Street, sitcom Coach and The Oprah Winfrey Show. They have also appeared in People magazine.

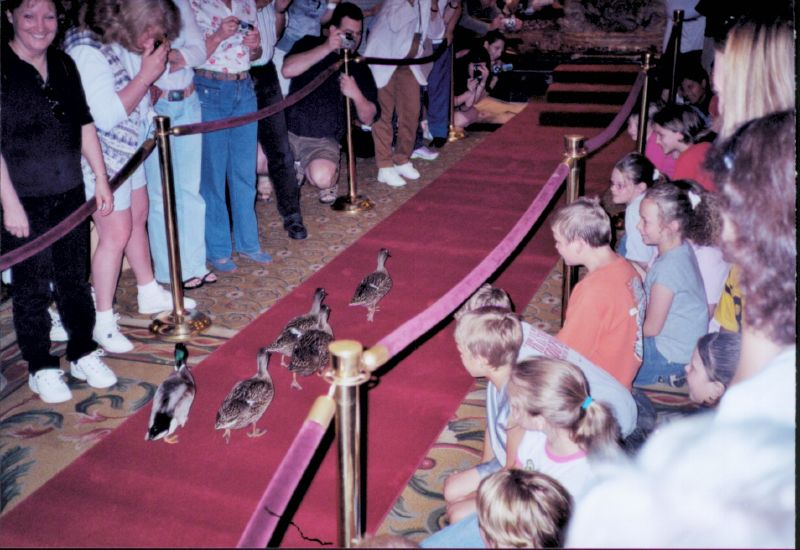
Ducks marching to the fountain

The position of "Duckmaster" at the Peabody Memphis is the only such position in the world. Celebrities have also assumed the role of Honorary Duckmaster from time to time, including Zane Lamprey, Paula Deen, Joan Collins, Molly Ringwald, Kevin Bacon, Gerry Tidd Peter Frampton, Emeril Lagasse, Patrick Swayze, Queen Noor of Jordan, Oprah Winfrey, Stephen Fry, Rudolph van Veen, Gayle King, Roy Williams, Bill Pierce, Shannon The Dude, Matt Jones, Drew Franklin and Ryan Lemond, and by Rhett and Link of Good Mythical Morning.

The custom of keeping ducks in the lobby fountain may date back even further than the 1930s. A pre-1915 postcard highlights the ducks playing in the fountain, and one source claims the custom goes back to the hotel's opening in 1869.

However, the Peabody itself claims the duck tradition to have started in 1933, as on December 3, 2008, they unveiled a new "Duck Palace" located on the rooftop, for the 75th anniversary of the duck tradition. The 24 by 12-foot enclosure features granite flooring, ceiling fans, a scale replica of the hotel, a fountain decorated with a pair of bronze ducks, and a large viewing window for guests to view the ducks. The Duck Palace cost approximately $200,000 to construct.

== Design features ==
The Peabody Hotel's most recognizable features are large red neon "The Peabody" signs atop the Skyway Ballroom and the central elevator shaft.

The top floor, the Skyway and Rooftop, offers views of the surrounding Memphis skyscrapers. The rooftop is often used as a space for bands and other musical acts, especially during the Thursday night "Rooftop Parties" in the summer months.

In the elevators, one must press "S" to access the top floor. If this floor were numbered, one would press "13" to reach it, but due to superstitions regarding the number thirteen, management decided to call the top floor "the Skyway."

== Floor layout ==
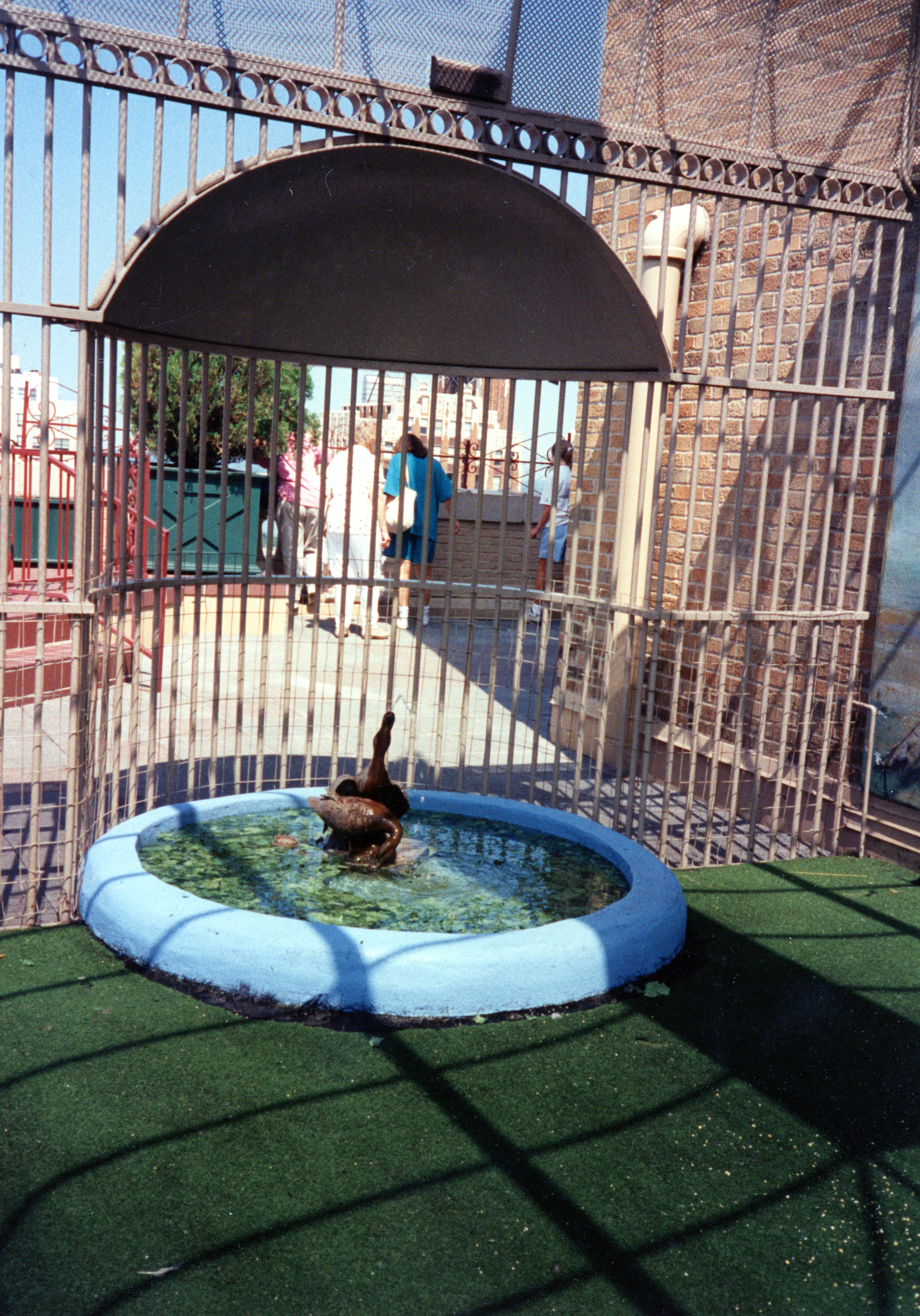
Peabody Duck Palace swimming pool

13 (S) – The Rooftop, Duck Palace, The Skyway Ballroom

12 – The Peabody Club, The Presidential Suite, Club Level guest rooms

11 – Standard guest rooms, Junior Suites, Romeo and Juliet Suites

10 – Standard guest rooms, Junior Suites, Edward Pembroke Suite

09 through 08 – Standard guest rooms

07 – Standard guest rooms, W.C. Handy Suite

06 through 04 – Standard guest rooms

03 – The Peabody Executive Conference Center

02 (M) – Mezzanine level, The Peabody Grand Ballroom, Venetian Room, Continental Ballroom, Louis XVI Room, Forest Room, Hernando DeSoto Room, The Tennessee Exhibit Hall, The Peabody Memorabilia Room, Francis Scott Key Piano, Hotel kitchens, Banquet Offices

01 (L) – The Grand Lobby, Chez Philippe, Capriccio Grill, The Lobby Bar, Lansky Brothers, The Corner Bar, Peabody Deli and Desserts, The Grand Galleria of Shops, Guest registration, Valet, Concierge, Bell stand

LL – Lower Level (Basement), Administrative offices, Feather's Day Spa and Salon, Peabody Athletic Club, Shoeshine Parlor, Hotel pool

At one time Northwest Airlines had a ticket office in the Peabody Hotel Arcade.

== See also ==
- List of individual birds
