= Scimitar Building =

- U.S. National Register of Historic Places
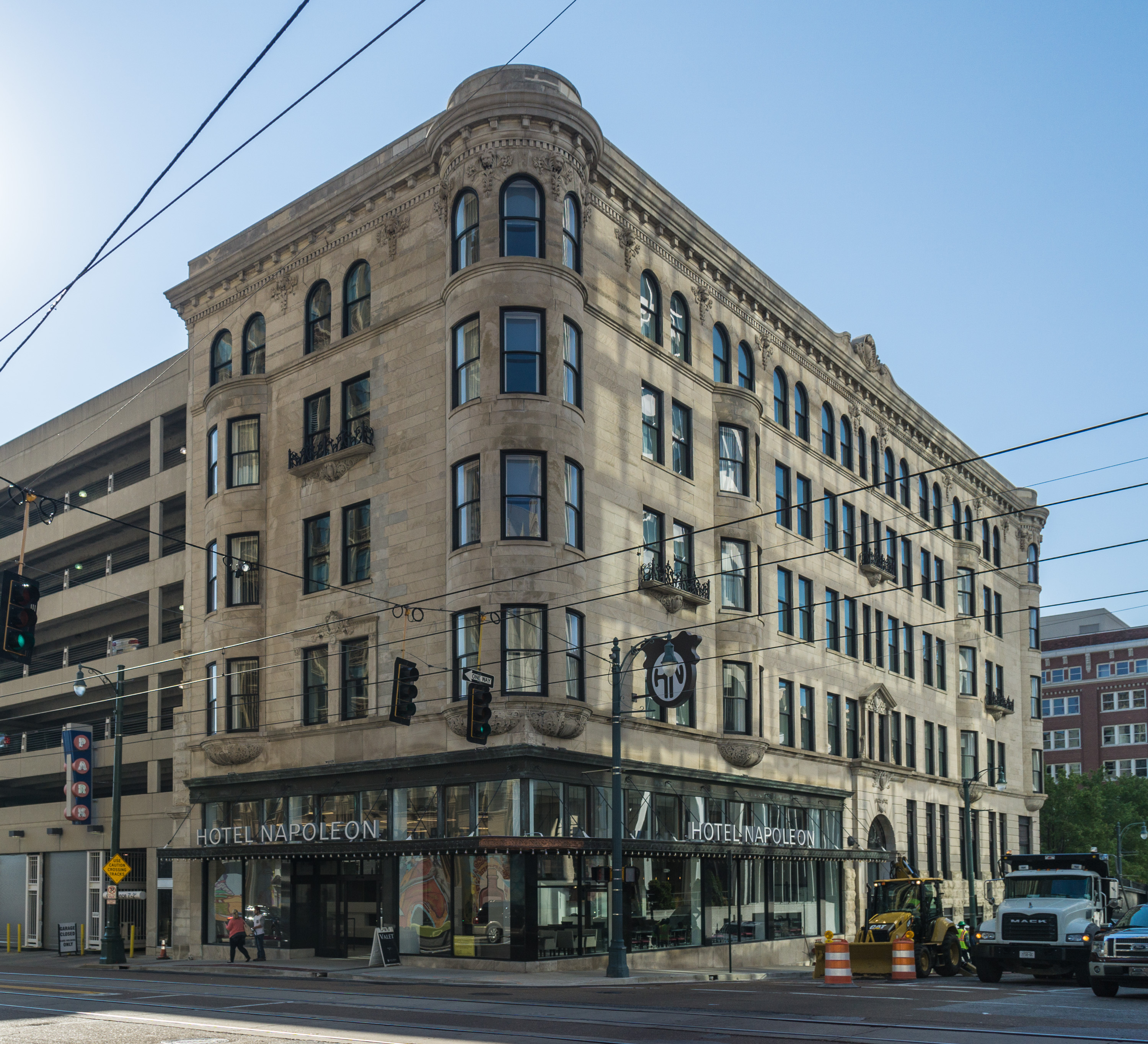
- Location: 179 Madison Avenue at Third Street; Memphis, Tennessee
- Coordinates: 35.14432°N 90.05023°W
- Built: 1902
- Architect: August A. Chigazola and William J. Hanker
- Website: hotelnapoleonmemphis.com
- NRHP reference No.: 83003065
- Added to NRHP: June 1983

Scimitar Building, also known as the Memphis Light, Gas, and Water Building, Winchester Building and most recently Hotel Napoleon, is a five-story stone-veneer structure in Memphis, Tennessee. Its architecture features a combination of Beaux-Arts and Romanesque Revival styles. It started life as the home of the Memphis newspaper Evening Scimitar and is currently a boutique hotel.

== Building ==
The Scimitar Building is a five-story stoned-veneer structure on a raised basement, designed in a combination of Beaux-Arts and Romanesque revival styles. The lobby is lined with original Tennessee marble, and is encircled by large circular, arched windows.

Originally the building had entrances on both Third and Madison streets. Lion heads decorate the top of the building along the fifth floor.

Although several alterations have been done in 1920s, 1950s, 1970s, and 2010s, the building overall retains a high degree of historical and architectural integrity.

== History ==
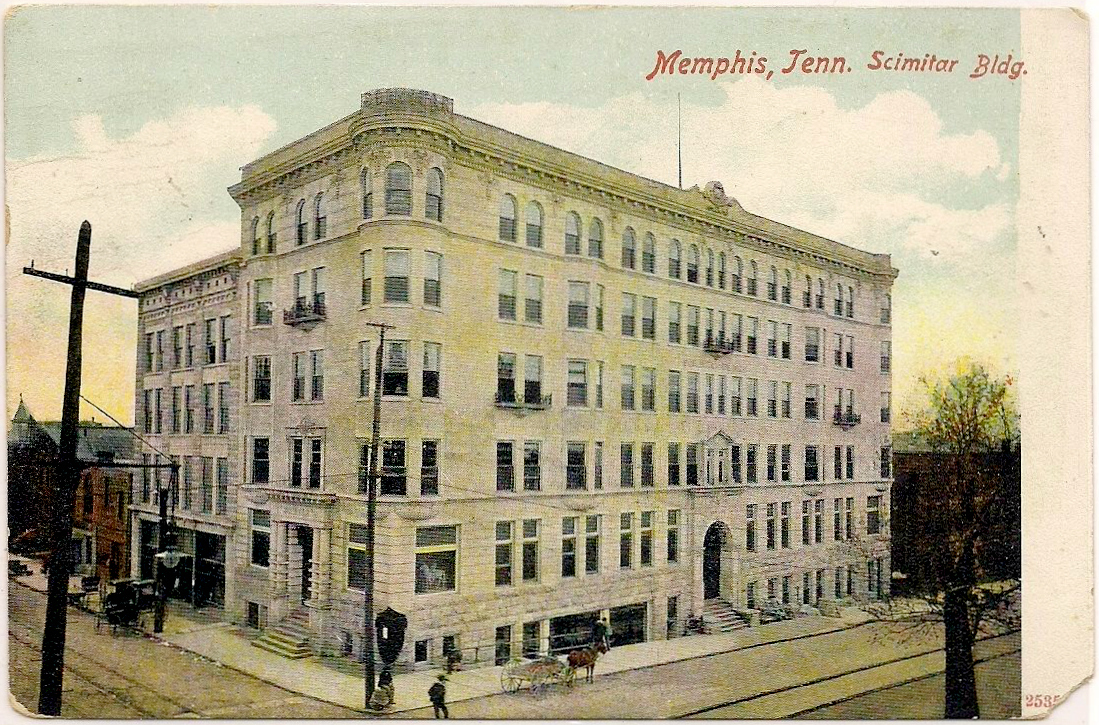
Scimitar Building in 1909

The Scimitar Building was commissioned by Napoleon Hill (1830–1909) in 1902 and designed by local architects August A. Chigazola (1869-1911) and William J. Hanker (1876–1958). Hill, known as Memphis' original "merchant prince", was one of the wealthiest people in Memphis, and a part owner of the Evening Scimitar. Hill lived across Madison Avenue in a mansion which stood on the site of the present Sterick Building. Hill's initials can still be seen etched into the façade of the building.

The Scimitar Building was home to the Memphis newspaper Evening Scimitar (later News-Scimitar and then Press-Scimitar) from 1902 to 1929. The newspaper took up three floors of the building. The raised basement was home to the stereotype and composing rooms of the newspaper, as well as the press machinery. People on the street could view the press machinery in operation through the building's giant windows. In 1926, the newspaper outgrew the building and moved to an address on Union Avenue.

The building was the headquarters for Memphis Light, Gas and Water from 1937 to 1970. Later, the building was an office building known as the Winchester Building. The Winchester Building was added to the National Register of Historic Places in 1983. The property went on the market in 2012 and was sold in 2014 for $1.26 million.

In 2016 the building re-opened as the Hotel Napoleon with 56 guest rooms, a business center, and fitness center. The local architecture firm, UrbanARCH, was responsible for the re-design and conversion. The project garnered both local and regional design awards recognition. Named after original owner Napoleon Hill, the hotel is a member of Ascend Hotels, the boutique brand of parent company Choice Hotels.

== See also ==
- National Register of Historic Places listings in Shelby County, Tennessee
