= Jones & Furbringer =

American architectural firm

Jones & Furbringer was an architectural firm founded in 1904 by the partnership of Walk Claridge Jones, Sr. and Max H. Furbringer. It designed a number of buildings that are listed on the U.S. National Register of Historic Places. The firm eventually was absorbed into brg3s.

Works by either architect individually or by the firm include:

- Boyce-Gregg House, 317 S. Highland St. Memphis, TN (Jones & Furbringer), NRHP-listed
- Cordova School, 1017 Sanga Rd. Memphis, TN (Furbringer, Max H.), NRHP-listed
- Greenwood, 1560 Central Ave. Memphis, TN (Jones & Furbringer), NRHP-listed
- Hotel Claridge, 109 N. Main St. Memphis, TN (Jones & Furbringer), NRHP-listed
- Peabody Elementary School, 2086 Young Ave. Memphis, TN (Jones & Furbringer), NRHP-listed
- Rozelle Elementary School, 993 Roland St. Memphis, TN (Jones & Furbringer), NRHP-listed
- Shrine Building, (1923), 66 Monroe Ave. Memphis, TN (Jones & Furbringer), NRHP-listed

Elvis Presley's Graceland, 3764 Elvis Presley Blvd. Memphis, TN has association of architects Furbringer & Ehrman, and is also NRHP-listed
