= Hanker & Cairns =

Architectural firm in Memphis, Tennessee

Hanker & Cairns was an architectural firm of Memphis, Tennessee. It was formed in 1903 as a partnership of William Julius Hanker (1876-1958) and Bayard Snowden Cairns (1875-1934).

The firm Chigazola and Hanker designed the Memphis Scimitar building. August A Chigazola was born in Memphis and attended Christian Brothers College. Hanker joined his firm as a draftsman. He and Hanker added Cairns to form Chigazola, Hanker & Cairns by 1905.

The firm has a number of works that are listed on the U.S. National Register of Historic Places.

== Work ==
Works include (with attribution to a partner or to the firm):

- Shrine Building (1923), 66 Monroe Ave., Memphis, Tennessee (Hanker & Cairns), NRHP-listed
- the "new" Peabody Hotel (1925), Memphis
- Sears and Roebuck tower (1927), Memphis
- Bank of Commerce and Trust Company Building (1929), 45 S. 2nd St., Memphis, Tennessee (Hanker & Cairns), NRHP-listed
- Cleveland Founders Historic District, roughly bounded by Victoria Ave., Sunflower Rd., Bolivar Ave., S Bayou Ave., & Avery St., Cleveland, Mississippi (Hanker & Cairns), NRHP-listed
- Crisscross Lodge, 10056 Poplar Ave., Collierville, Tennessee (Hanker & Cairns), NRHP-listed
- B. Lowenstein & Brothers Building, 27 S. Main St., Memphis, Tennessee (Hanker and Cairns), NRHP-listed
- Memphis Trust Building, 12 S. Main St., Memphis, Tennessee (Hanker & Cairns), NRHP-listed
- National Bank of Commerce Building, 200 S. Pruett St., Paragould, Arkansas (Hankers and Cairns), NRHP-listed
- Joseph Newburger House, built 1912, 168 E. Parkway, South, Memphis, Tennessee (Hanker & Cairns), NRHP-listed now the Memphis Theological Seminary
- Scimitar Building, 179 Madison Ave., Memphis, Tennessee (Hanker, William J.), NRHP-listed
- Scottish Rite Temple (Memphis, Tennessee) (Hanker and Cairns), Memphis
- Cutrer Mansion, 109 Clark Street, Clarksdale, Mississippi (Hanker & Cairns)
- Peabody Hotel
- Nineteenth Century Club
