= Joseph Newburger House =

- U.S. National Register of Historic Places
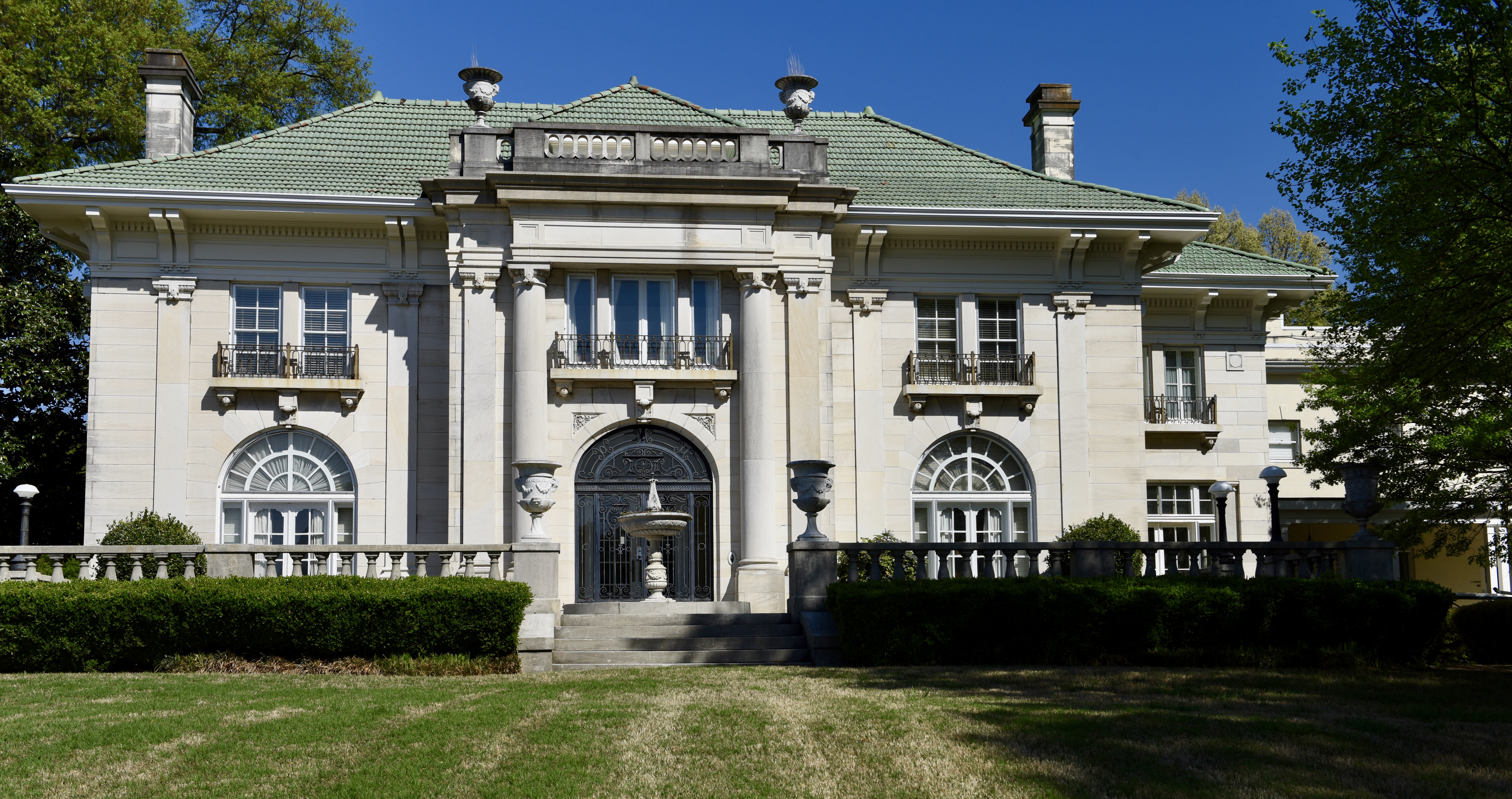

- Location within Tennessee Location within the United States
- Location: 168 East Parkway, South, Memphis, Tennessee
- Coordinates: 35°07′58″N 89°58′58″W
- Area: 1.5 acres (0.61 ha)
- Built: 1912
- Architect: Hanker & Cairns
- Architectural style: Beaux Arts
- NRHP reference No.: 82004050
- Added to NRHP: April 29, 1982

The Joseph Newburger House is a historic house in Memphis in the U.S. state of Tennessee. It was built in 1912 for Joseph Newburger, a businessman from Mississippi who was the founder of the Newburger Cotton Company as well as the president of the Memphis Packing Corporation, the Memphis Rice Mills, and the Joy Rice Milling Company. The house was home to the Memphis Theological Seminary from 1963 to 2026.

The house was designed by Hanker & Cairns in the Beaux Arts architectural style. It was listed on the National Register of Historic Places in 1982.
