= First Congregational Church and Parish House =

Historic church in Tennessee, United States

- U.S. National Register of Historic Places
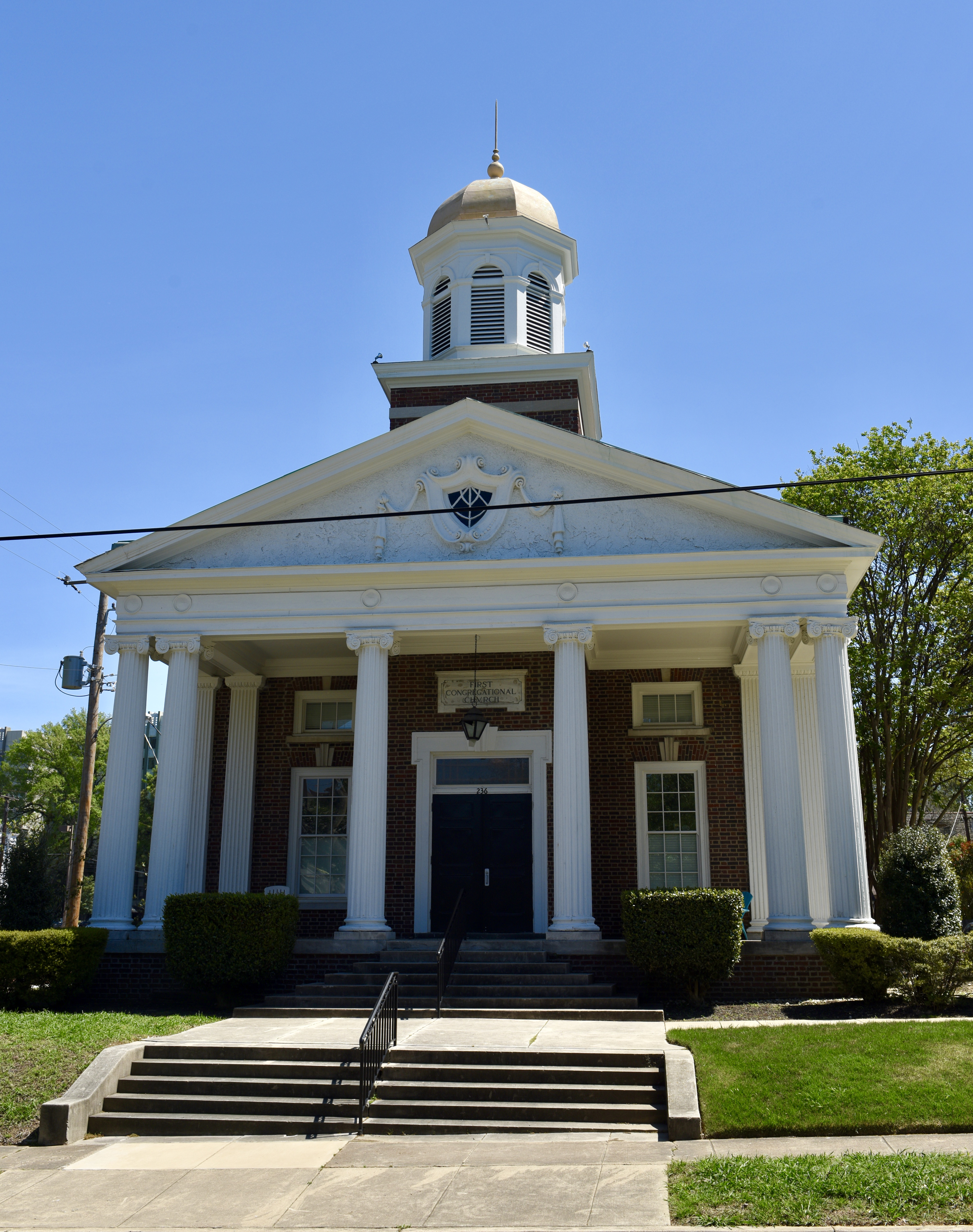

- Location within Tennessee Location within the United States
- Location: 234 S. Watkins St., Memphis, Tennessee
- Coordinates: 35°8′7″N 90°0′50″W
- Area: 0.5 acres (0.20 ha)
- Built: 1910
- Architect: Walk Claridge Jones, Sr.
- Architectural style: Colonial Revival, Georgian Revival
- NRHP reference No.: 80003862
- Added to NRHP: July 21, 1980

The First Congregational Church and Parish House, now the Holy Covenant Church, in Memphis, Tennessee are a historic church and parish house on a single lot at 234 S. Watkins Street. The Georgian Revival-style church is a high one-story church which was built in 1910. It was added to the National Register of Historic Places in 1980.

It was deemed "significant both as a fine example of the Georgian Revival style and as the work of prominent Memphis architect Walk Claridge Jones, Sr. A regional leader in the profession, Jones abhorred modem architecture, preferring instead a simplified classical style. The First Congregational Church, with its Ionic portico, rectangular plan and symmetrical fenestration, illustrates this philosophy."
