= Bank of Commerce and Trust Company Building =

- U.S. National Register of Historic Places
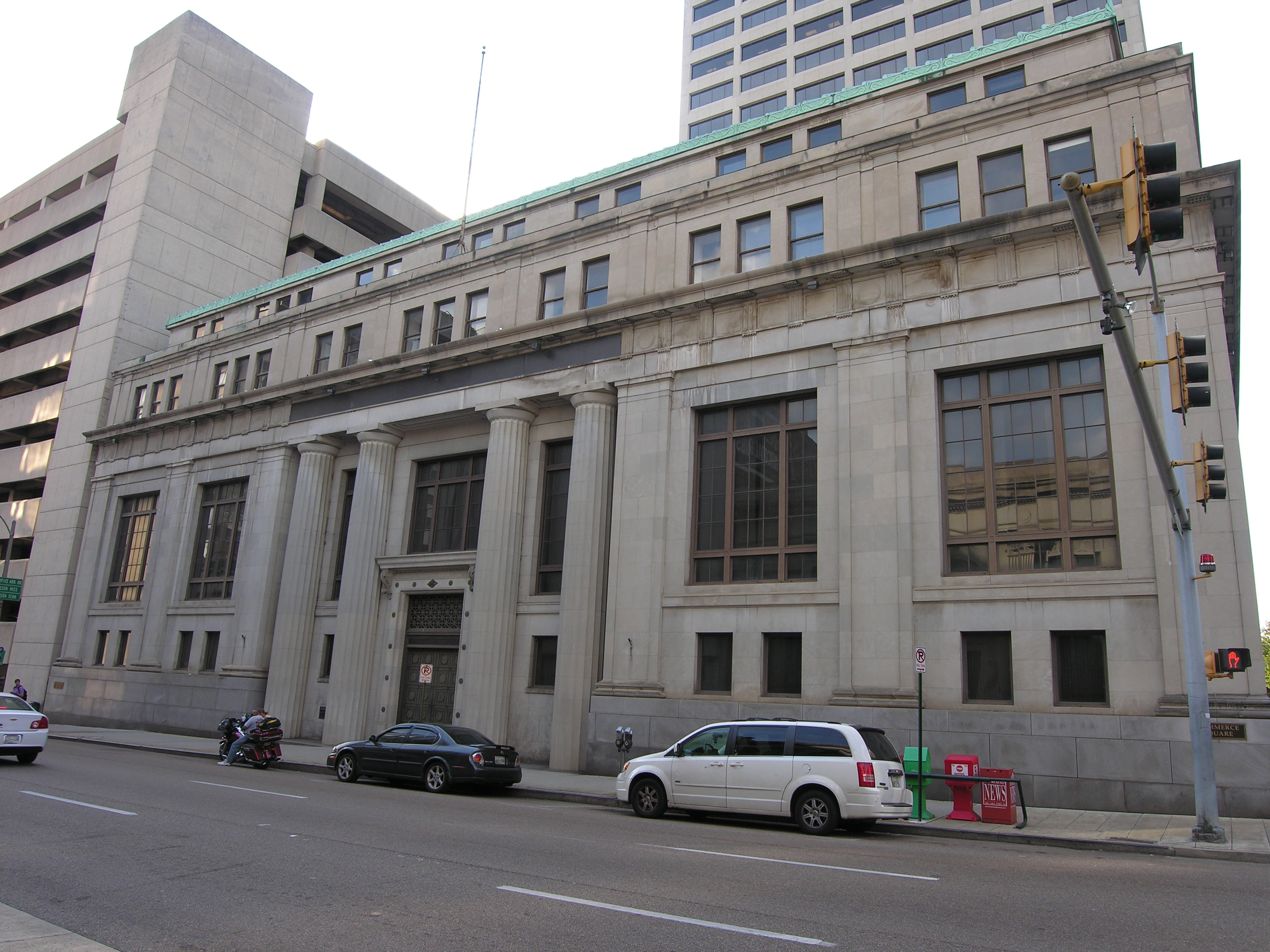
- The Bank of Commerce and Trust Company Building in 2014

- Location within Tennessee Location within the United States
- Location: 45 South 2nd Street, Memphis, Tennessee
- Coordinates: 35°8′36″N 90°3′8″W
- Area: 0.5 acres (0.20 ha)
- Built: 1929
- Architectural style: Classical Revival
- NRHP reference No.: 80003857
- Added to NRHP: May 7, 1980

The Bank of Commerce and Trust Company Building is a historic building in Downtown Memphis, Tennessee, U.S.. It was built in 1929 for the bank of Commerce and Trust, later known as the National Bank of Commerce (now part of SunTrust Banks).

Its construction cost $2 million. It was designed by Hanker & Cairns in the Classical Revival architectural style. It has been listed on the National Register of Historic Places since May 7, 1980.
