= Pauline Cheek Barton House =

- U.S. National Register of Historic Places
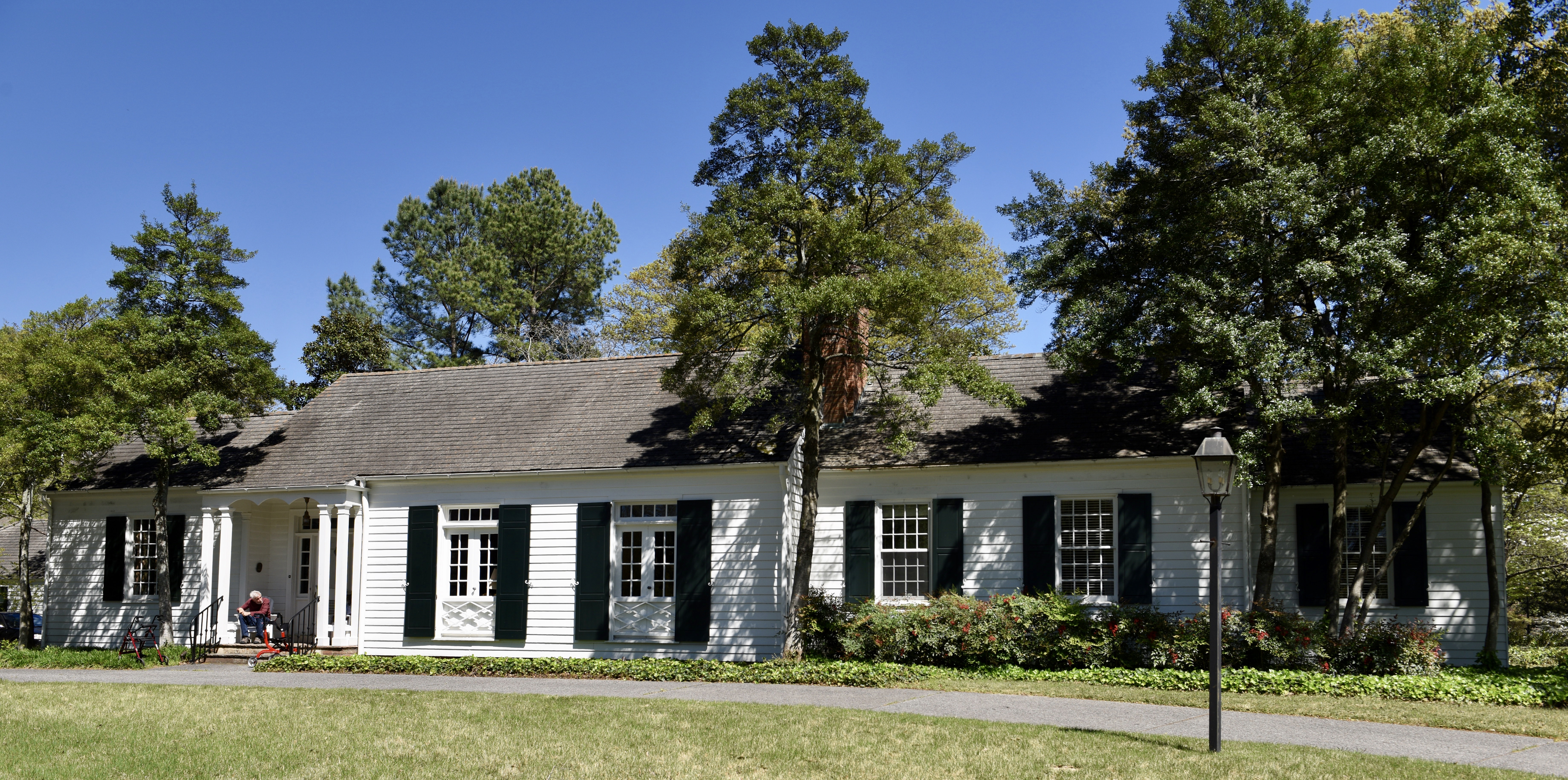
- The house in 2017

- Location within Tennessee
- Location: 6562 Green Shadows Lane, Memphis, Tennessee
- Coordinates: 35°05′24″N 89°50′42″W
- Area: less than one acre
- Built: 1937
- Architect: Walk Claridge Jones, Sr.
- Architectural style: Colonial Revival
- NRHP reference No.: 95001069
- Added to NRHP: September 7, 1995

The Pauline Cheek Barton House is a historic house in Memphis, Tennessee. It was designed in the Colonial Revival style by architect Walk Claridge Jones, Sr., and built in 1937. It has been listed on the National Register of Historic Places since September 7, 1995.
