= Shrine Building (Memphis, Tennessee) =

- U.S. National Register of Historic Places
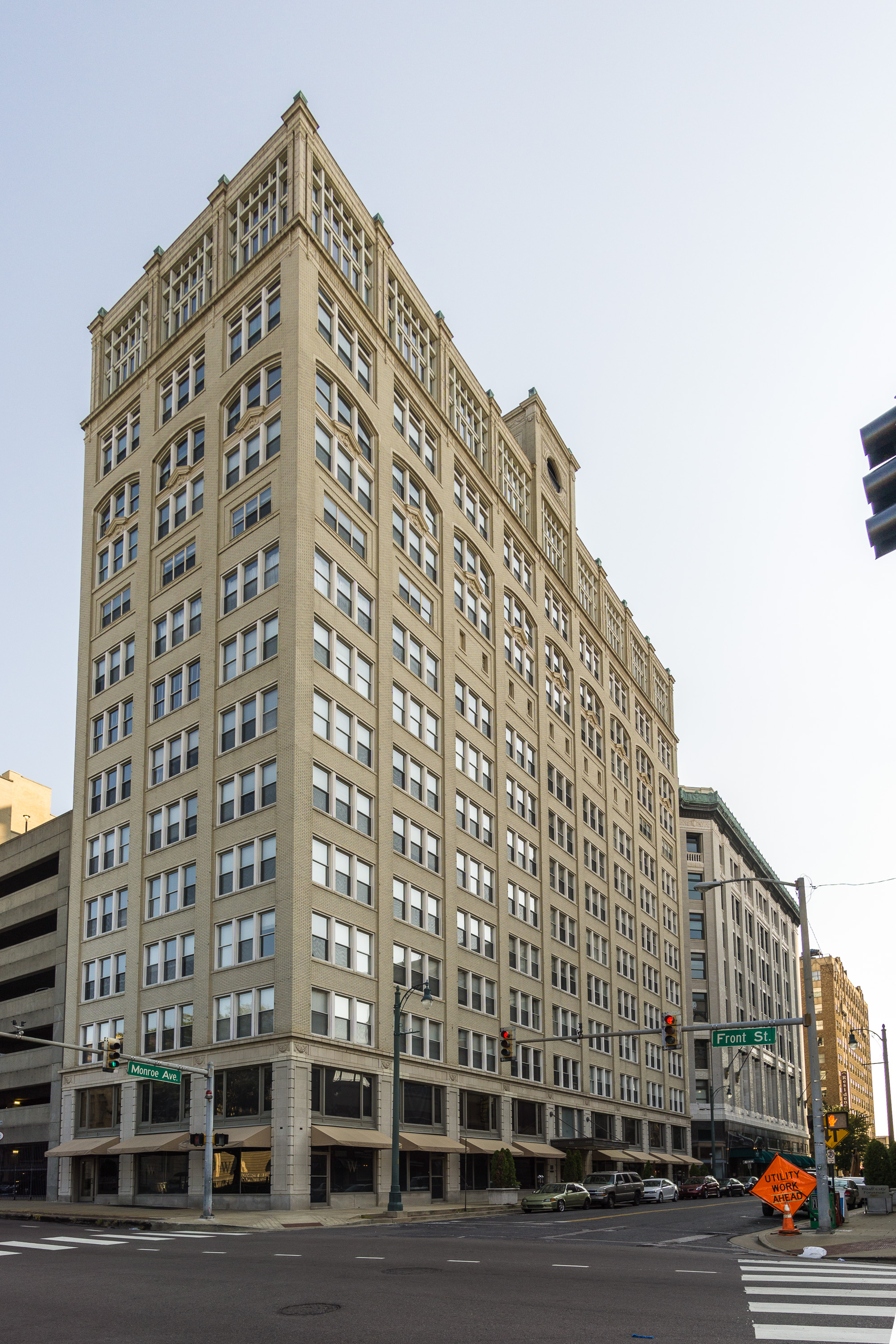

- Location within Tennessee Location within the United States
- Location: 66 Monroe Ave., Memphis, Tennessee
- Coordinates: 35°8′40″N 90°3′16″W
- Built: 1923
- Architect: Hanker & Cairns; Jones & Furbringer
- NRHP reference No.: 79002479

The Shrine Building in downtown Memphis, Tennessee was built in 1923 to serve as the headquarters of the Al Chymia Shrine, a group of Shriners. It was listed on the National Register of Historic Places in 1979. It was converted to apartments in 1981 and was converted again in 2005 to house 75 condominium apartments.

It was designed by architects Jones & Furbringer.

It was also a work of architects Hanker & Cairns. Sometimes a building is the work of more than one architect, or a later renovation or extension is done by another firm.

== See also ==
- National Register of Historic Places listings in Shelby County, Tennessee
