= B. Lowenstein & Brothers Building =

- U.S. National Register of Historic Places
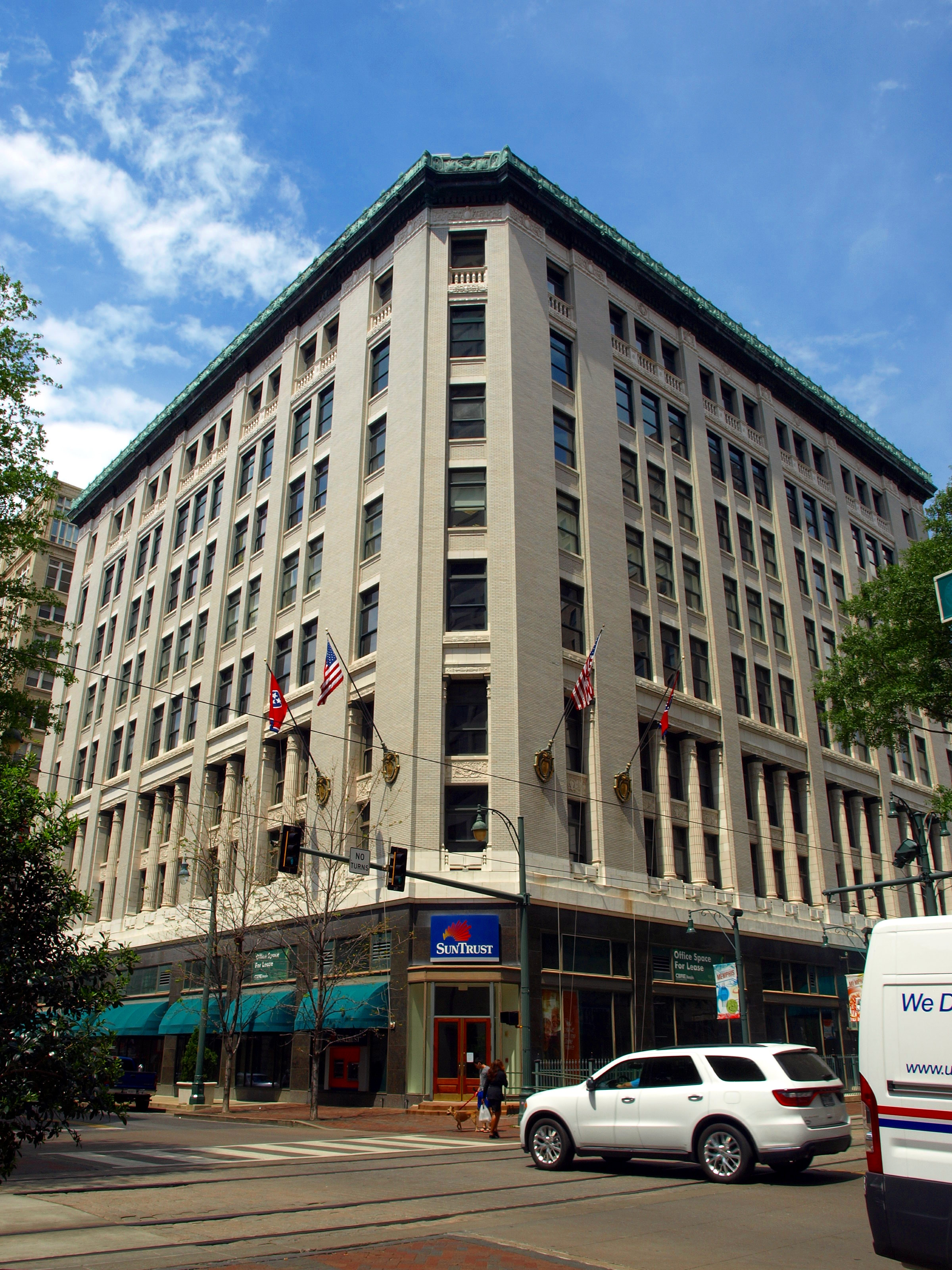
- The B. Lowenstein & Brothers Building in 2017

- Location within Tennessee Location within the United States
- Location: 27 South Main Street, Memphis, Tennessee
- Coordinates: 35°8′39″N 90°3′11″W
- Area: 0.5 acres (0.20 ha)
- Built: 1924
- Architect: Hanker & Cairns; Emile Weil
- Architectural style: Beaux Arts
- NRHP reference No.: 83003063
- Added to NRHP: June 16, 1983

The B. Lowenstein & Brothers Building is a historic building in Memphis, Tennessee, U.S. It was built in 1924 for the Lowenstein Company, a clothing company founded by Benedict Lowenstein, a German immigrant, in 1855. It was designed in the Beaux-Arts architectural style by Hanker & Cairns, in conjunction with Emile Weil. It has been listed on the National Register of Historic Places since June 16, 1983.
