= Gregg-Wallace Farm Tenant House =

Historic house in South Carolina, United States

- U.S. National Register of Historic Places
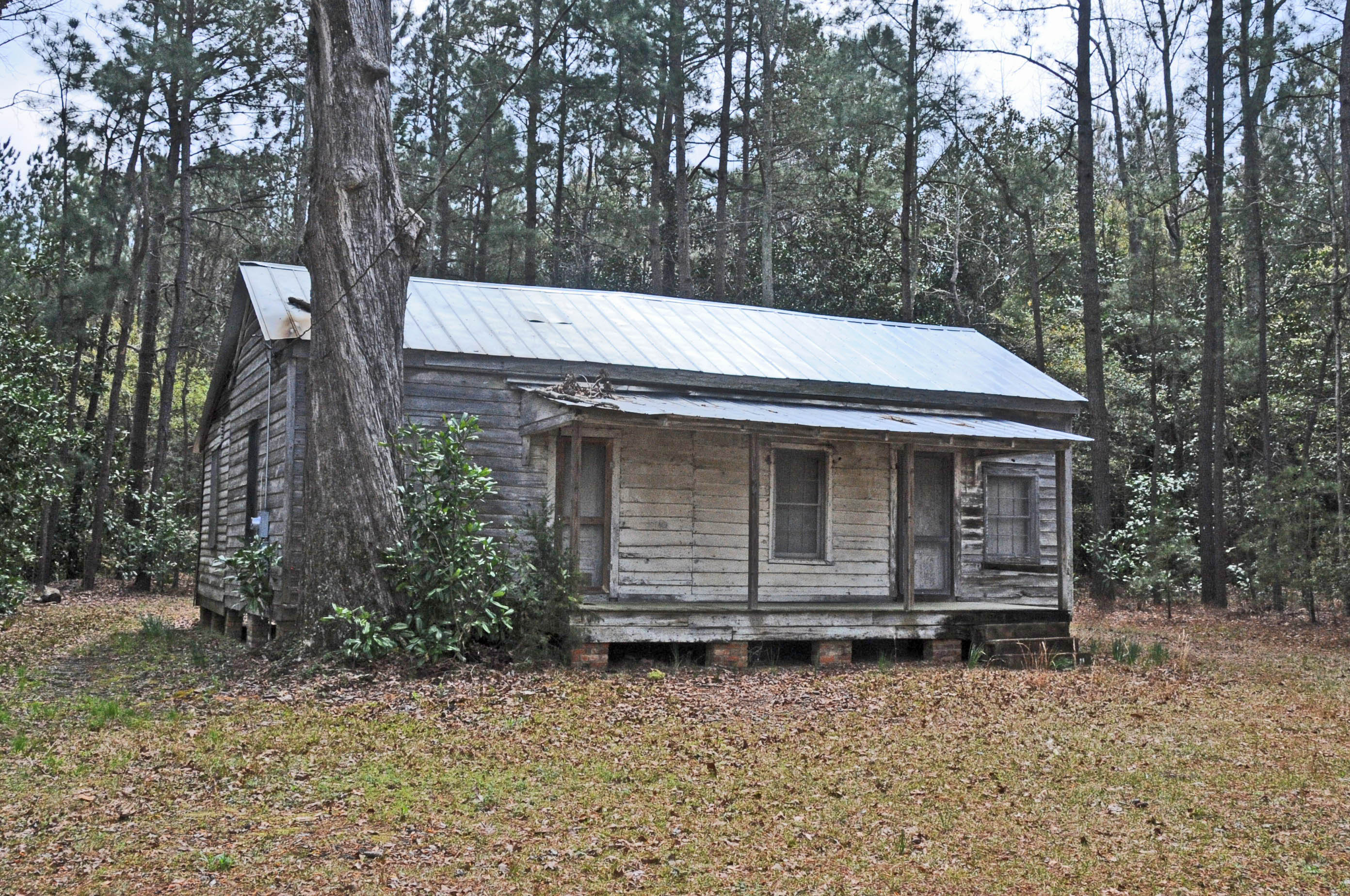

- Location within South Carolina Location within the United States
- Location: 310 Price Rd., near Mars Bluff, South Carolina
- Coordinates: 34°12′06″N 79°39′07″W
- Area: less than one acre
- Built: c. 1890
- NRHP reference No.: 01001550
- Added to NRHP: January 28, 2002

Gregg-Wallace Farm Tenant House is a historic home located near Mars Bluff, Florence County, South Carolina. It was built about 1890, and is representative of a typical Mars Bluff vernacular tenant house for African Americans. Tenant houses often evolved from one-room slave houses, first by the addition of a shed room at the rear and a front porch, then by the addition of a second room.

It was listed on the National Register of Historic Places in 2002.
