= Hotel Claridge (Memphis, Tennessee) =

- U.S. National Register of Historic Places
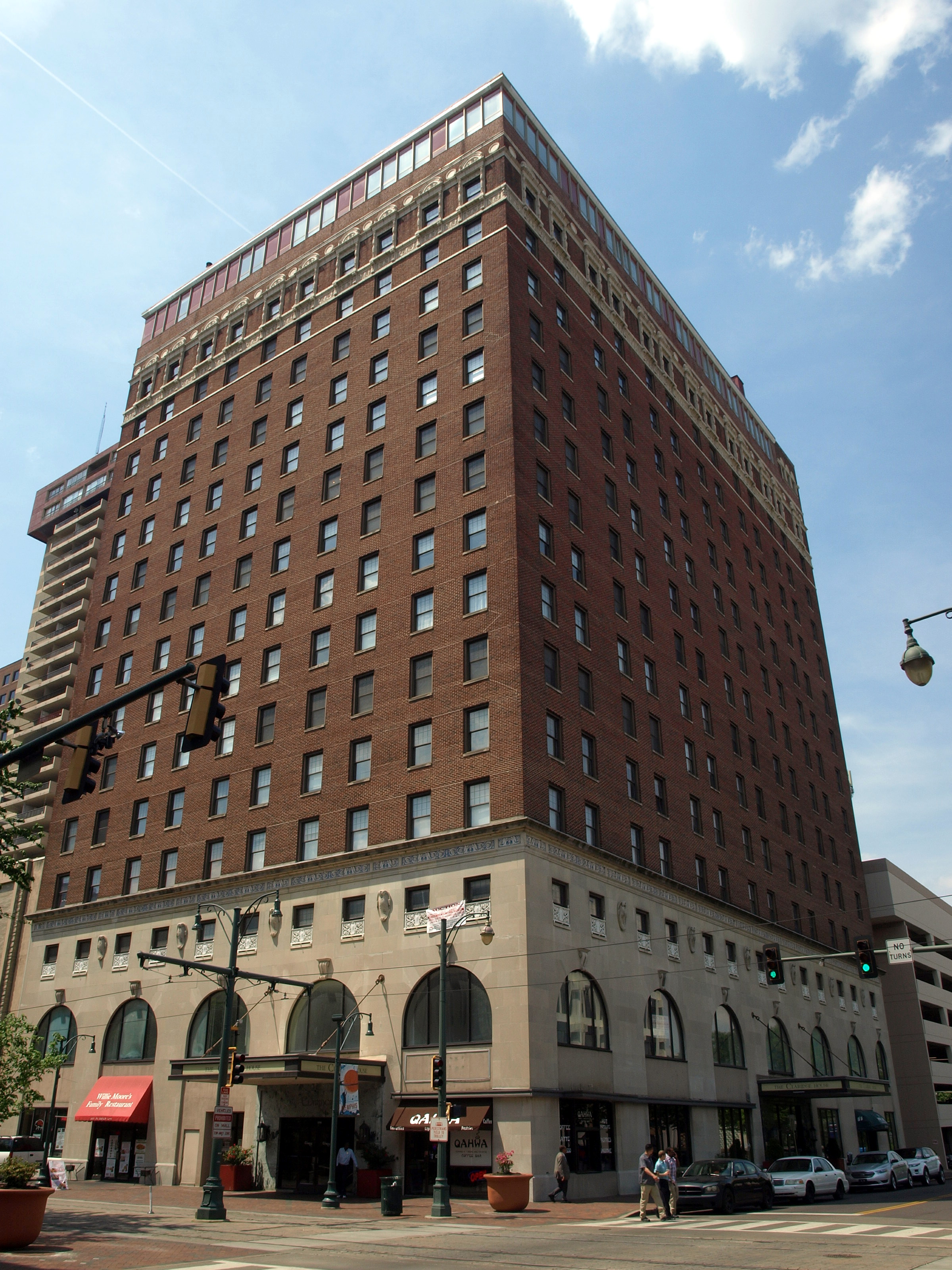
- Hotel Claridge in 2017

- Location within Tennessee Location within the United States
- Location: 109 North Main Street, Memphis, Tennessee
- Coordinates: 35°8′52″N 90°3′6″W
- Area: less than one acre
- Built: 1924
- NRHP reference No.: 82004045
- Added to NRHP: April 29, 1982

Hotel Claridge is a historic hotel building in Memphis, Tennessee. It was built in 1924 for Charles Levy and Morris Corn, two businessmen from St. Louis, Missouri. Its construction cost $1.5 million, and it was designed by the Memphis architectural firm of Jones & Furbringer and the St. Louis firm of Barnett, Haynes & Barnett.

Hotel Claridge is at 109 North Main Street in Memphis. In the 1930s and 40s, it housed the studios of radio station 560 AM WHBQ.

It has been listed on the National Register of Historic Places since April 29, 1982.
