= Gregg House (Fayetteville, Arkansas) =

Historic house in Arkansas, United States

- U.S. National Register of Historic Places
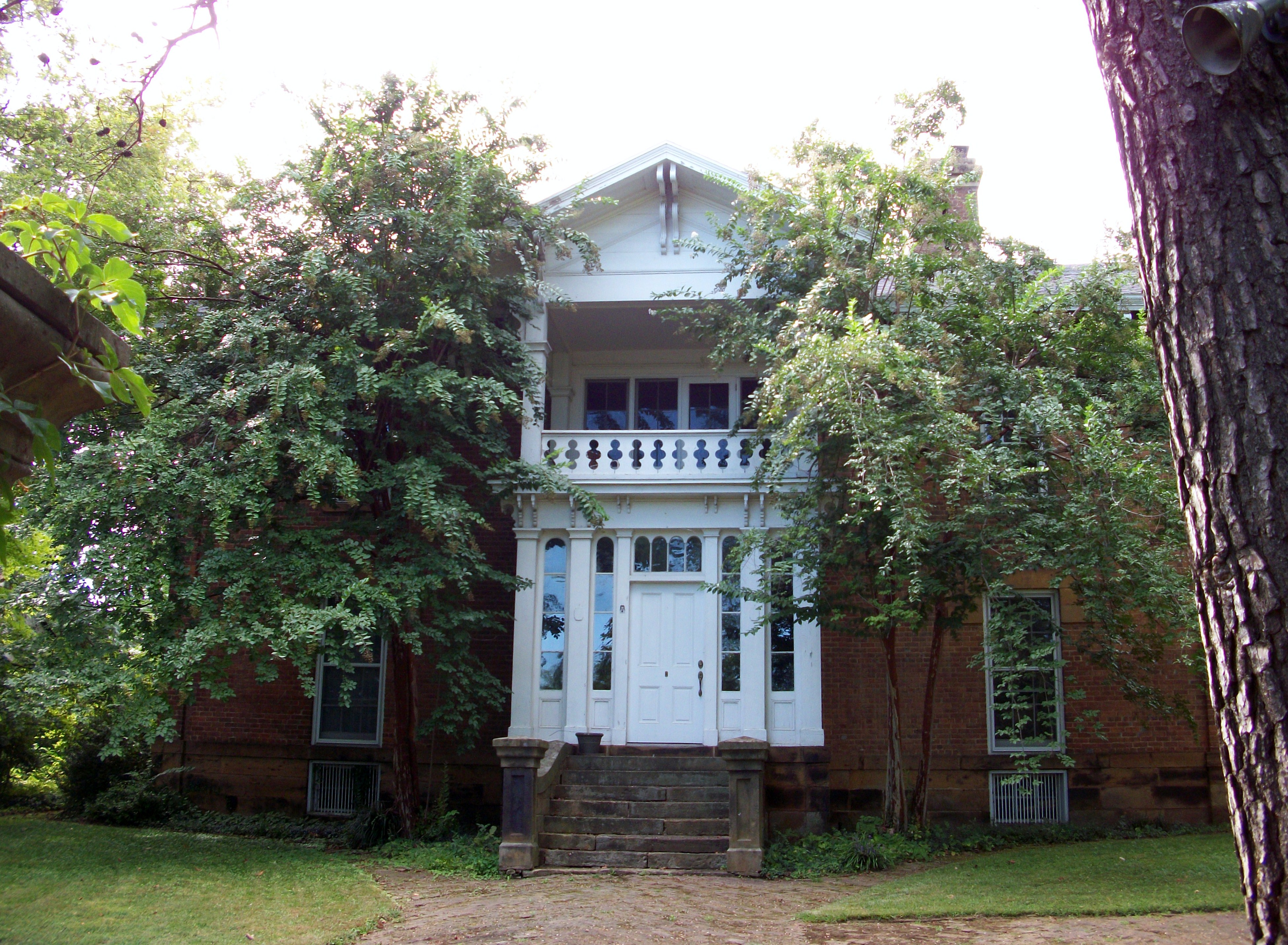

- Location within Arkansas Location within the United States
- Location: 339 N. Gregg St., Fayetteville, Arkansas
- Coordinates: 36°4′4″N 94°10′1″W
- Area: less than one acre
- Built: 1871
- NRHP reference No.: 74000502
- Added to NRHP: September 17, 1974

The Gregg House is a historic house at 339 Gregg Street in Fayetteville, Arkansas, near the University of Arkansas campus. It was built in 1871 and listed on the National Register of Historic Places in 1974.

== Architecture ==
A 2 1/2 story Georgian home built on large sandstone blocks, the Gregg House has brick exterior walls generally one foot (0.30 m) thick. The two story portico is open to the air on the second floor and enclosed by glass panels on the first floor. Two chimneys provide access for eight fireplaces. A small 1 1/2 story building is connected via a breezeway, called an "ice house" by the Gregg family. The property is bordered by an ornamental iron fence and large trees.

== Eponym ==
Lafayette Gregg relocated to northwest Arkansas from Moulton, Alabama as a child in 1835. After growing up on a Washington County farm, Gregg read law in Fayetteville and passed the bar exam, rising to become a prominent attorney in town. During the Civil War, Gregg was in charge of the Fourth Arkansas Cavalry (Federal) He was elected to the Arkansas House of Representatives after the war, later becoming the prosecutor for the Fourth Circuit, Chancellor of the Pulaski Chancery Court, and an associate justice of the Arkansas Supreme Court. Gregg also secured support for locating the Arkansas Industrial University in Fayetteville (now known as the University of Arkansas). Following its founding in 1871, Gregg was elected to the board of trustees. Gregg also became president of the Bank of Fayetteville and was defeated in a gubernatorial bid by Simon Pollard Hughes, Jr. Following his death in 1891, courts, businesses, banks, and the university all closed on the day of Gregg's funeral. He is buried in nearby Evergreen Cemetery with several other influential Fayetteville residents.

== See also ==
- National Register of Historic Places listings in Washington County, Arkansas
