= Napoleon Hill (Memphis businessman) =

American businessman (1830–1909)

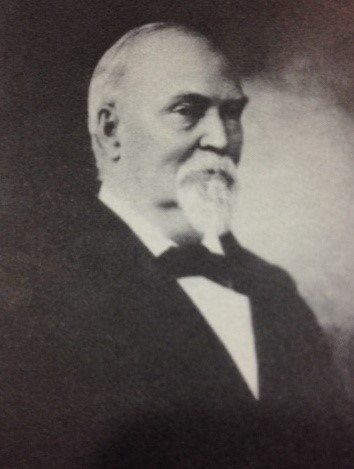
- Portrait of Napoleon Hill (1830–1909)
- Born: August 25, 1830; Tennessee, U.S.
- Died: November 2, 1909 (aged 79); Memphis, Tennessee, U.S.
- Citizenship: American
- Occupation: businessman
- Spouse: Mary Morton Wood Hill (1835–1922)
- Children: Matilda Hill; William Duncan Hill; Olivia Polk Hill Grosvenor; Napoleon Hill Jr.; May Hill Overton; Francis Fontaine Hill

Napoleon Hill (1830–1909) was an American businessman of Memphis, Tennessee, tagged as "the merchant prince of Memphis" by his contemporaries. He first inherited wealth from his father, made more in the California Gold Rush, and then moved to Memphis, where he became a leading businessman and investor. Hill was the second of eleven children of Duncan Hill, a physician and plantation owner, and Olivia L. Bill. Duncan Hill died in 1844, leaving his mother the Marshall County, Mississippi plantation, worth $40,000 at the time. She remarried to Josiah Deloach in 1848 and she and the children continued to live on the plantation. At age sixteen Hill left home and worked as a store clerk for a time, but left Tennessee for the 1849 California Gold Rush. Successful in California, he returned to Tennessee and by 1857 was living in Memphis, where he built a wholesale grocery business and traded in cotton on commission just before the American Civil War.

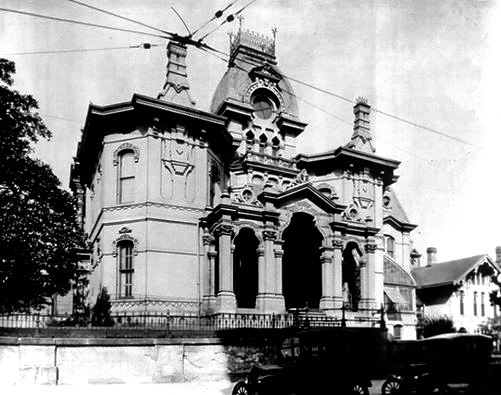
The former Napoleon Hill mansion in Memphis, Tennessee

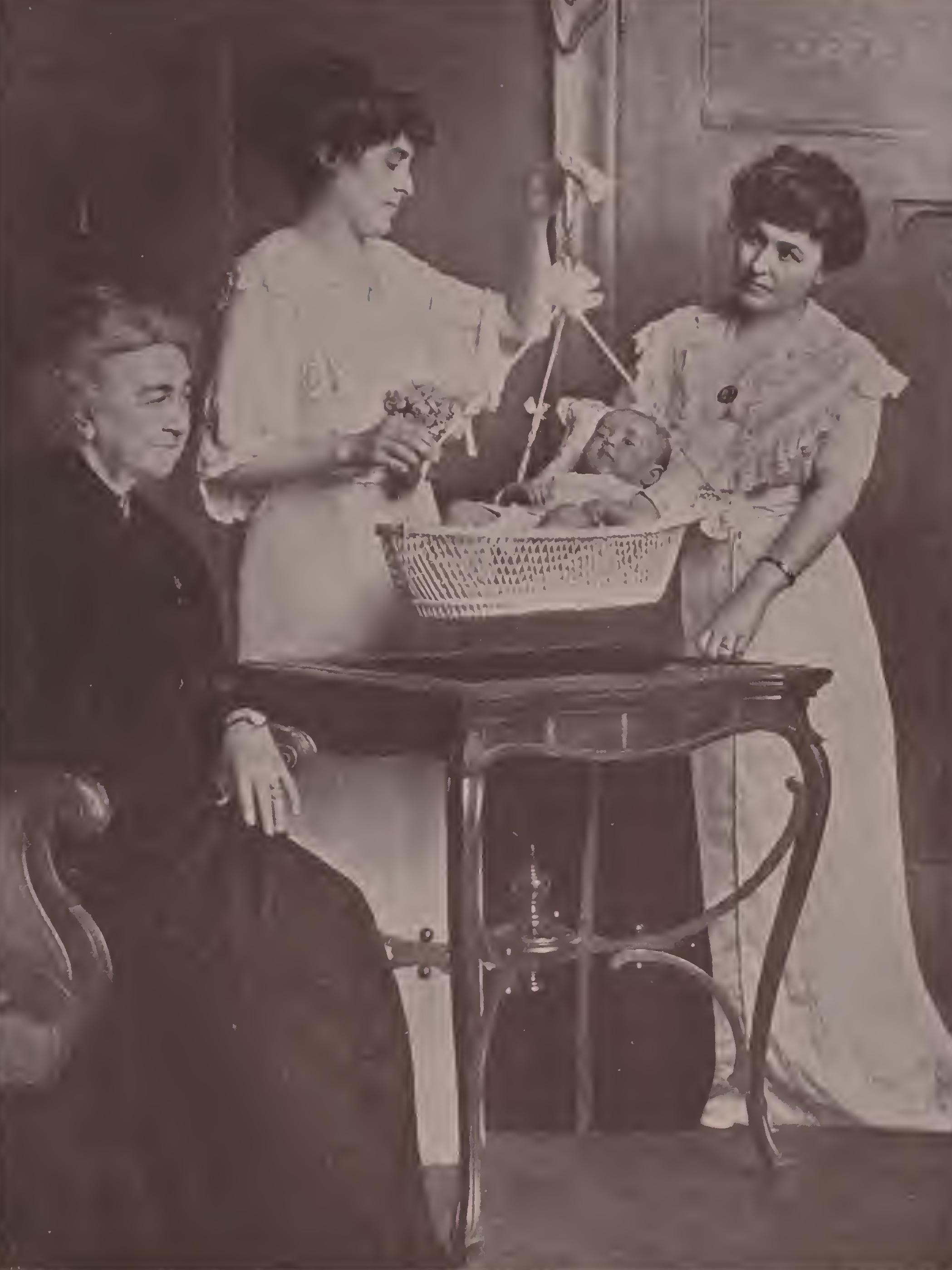
Mary Morton Wood Hill (left), wife of Napoleon Hill

Hill prospered in Memphis, and during the post-Civil War period he became a one of Memphis' most significant businessmen. His largest investment was Hill, Fontaine and Company, a cotton and wholesale grocery business. In addition, he invested in banks, real estate, and industrial development. Hill participated in organizing The Memphis Cotton Exchange in 1873 and served as its president from 1881 to 1883. In 1885 Hill and other prominent Memphis businessmen started a Memphis streetcar line, later acquired by the Memphis City Railroad Company. Hill was an early investor in the Birmingham, Alabama, steel industry, and was a major investor in Memphis' Union and Planters Bank, predecessor of Union Planters, and served as a bank director.

Hill's businesses and investments made him wealthy, powerful, and socially prominent. In 1881 Hill built a large mansion in the ornate French Renaissance style at the corner of 3rd and Madison Streets in downtown Memphis. The central business district location later led to its downfall, as the landmark mansion was torn down by 1930 to build the Sterick Building. In 1902 he commissioned the Scimitar Building at 179 Madison Avenue and Third Street, directly across from his home.

== Personal life and death ==
During their lives, Hill and his wife, Morton Wood Hill, received extensive coverage in Memphis newspapers, both for his business, civic and political activities, as well as for their social affairs. For example, a reception held by Mrs. Hill in 1891 received detailed coverage, "The event of the week in society circles was the afternoon reception given by Mrs. Napoleon Hill Wednesday afternoon...."

Hill died in 1909 and is buried in Elmwood Cemetery in Memphis. At the time of his death, his estate was considered the largest in Tennessee.
