= Boyce-Gregg House =

Historic house in Tennessee, United States

- U.S. National Register of Historic Places
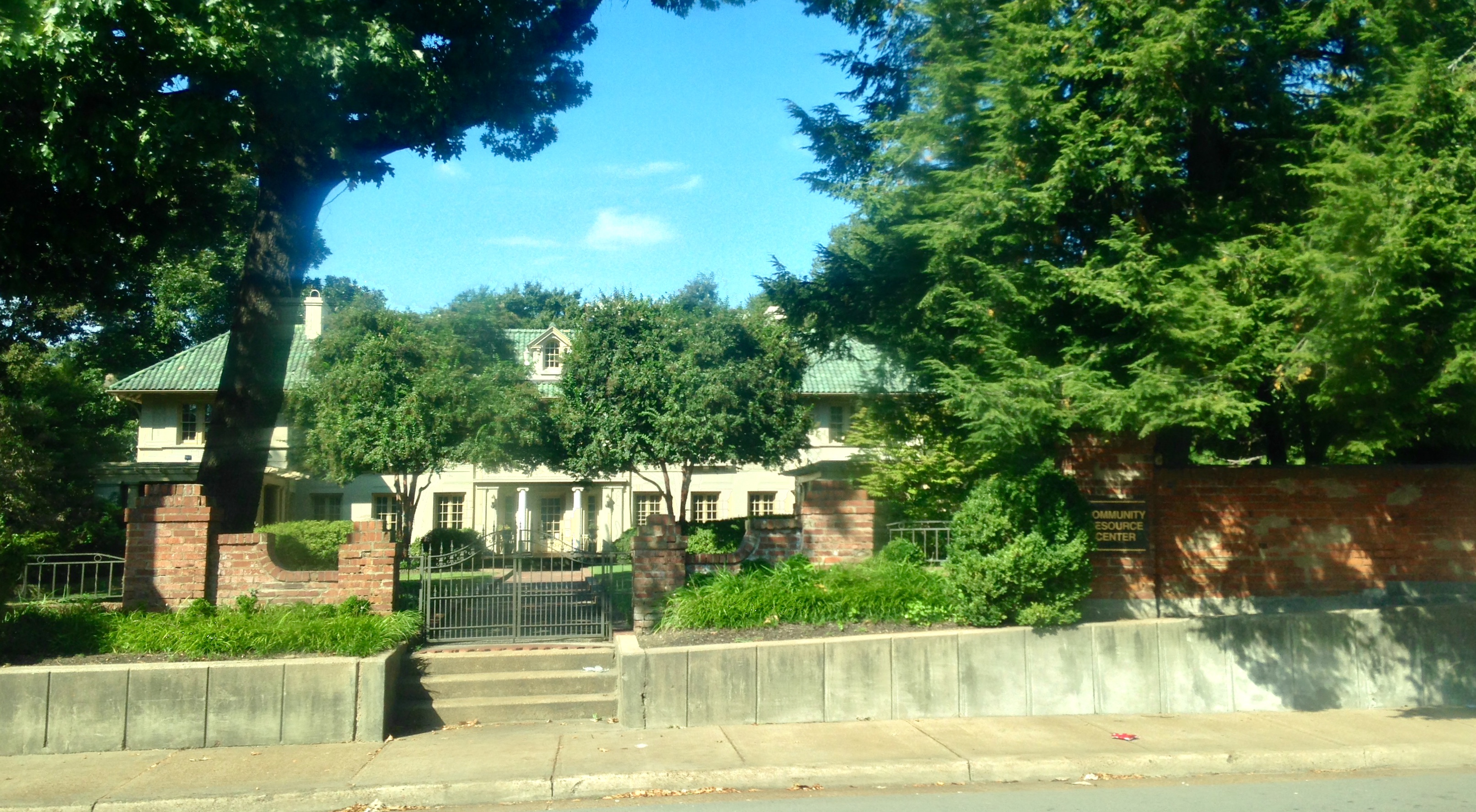
- The Boyce-Gregg House in 2014

- Location within Tennessee Location within the United States
- Location: 317 South Highland Street, Memphis, Tennessee
- Coordinates: 35°7′22″N 89°56′45″W
- Area: 2.6 acres (1.1 ha)
- Built: 1920
- Architectural style: Late 19th And 20th Century Revivals, Italian;Mediterranean
- NRHP reference No.: 79002462
- Added to NRHP: December 19, 1979

The Boyce-Gregg House is a historic house in Memphis, Tennessee.

== History ==
The house was built for C. R. Boyce, a cotton broker, in 1920. He died in 1930, and the house remained in the Boyce family until 1936.

The house was purchased by Russell C. Gregg, the Memphis manager of the Anderson, Clayton and Company, a cotton brokering firm. One of his daughters married Henry Loeb, the mayor of Memphis. In 1973, the house was purchased by his son-in-law, C. Wrede Petersmeyer.

The house served as a residence until 1979 when it was renovated by a local architectural firm for offices on the second floor for Day Companies, Inc. The house was bought by the Junior League of Memphis in 1991. The house, now called the Community Resource Center by the Junior League members, is used as a meeting space and wedding venue. The first floor remains almost completely the same as it did in 1920, besides renovation of the kitchen and the addition of a bathroom.

== Architectural significance ==
The house was designed by Jones & Furbringer. It has been listed on the National Register of Historic Places since December 19, 1979.
