= Charlotteville (disambiguation) =

Charlotteville is a village lying on the north-eastern tip of Tobago.

Charlotteville may also refer to:

== Places ==
=== United States ===
- Charlotteville, Georgia, an unincorporated community
- Charlotteville, New York, a hamlet in Summit, Schoharie County, New York

=== Other ===
- Charlotteville Centre, Ontario the former name of a medium-sized hamlet now named "Walsh"
- Charlotteville Township, Ontario
- Charlotteville, an area of Guildford in Surrey, England
  - Charlotteville Cycling Club, based in Guildford, England
- Campbleton-Charlotteville, Tobago

== See also ==
- Charlottesville (disambiguation)
