= Trinidadian and Tobagonian nationality law =

Trinidad and Tobago Citizenship Act

Parliament of Trinidad and Tobago
- Long title: An Act relating to Trinidad and Tobago citizenship
- Enacted by: Government of the Republic of Trinidad and Tobago
- Status: Current legislation

Trinidadian and Tobagonian nationality law is regulated by the Trinidad and Tobago Constitution Order of 1962, as amended; the 1976 Citizenship Act, and its revisions; and various British Nationality laws. These laws determine who is, or is eligible to be, a national of Trinidad and Tobago. Trinidadian and Tobagonian nationality is typically obtained either on the principle of jus soli, i.e. by birth in Trinidad and Tobago or under the rules of jus sanguinis, i.e. by birth abroad to parents with Trinidadian and Tobagonian nationality. It can be granted to persons with an affiliation to the country, or to a permanent resident who has lived in the country for a given period of time through naturalisation. There is not currently a program in Trinidad and Tobago for persons to acquire nationality through investment in the country. Nationality establishes one's international identity as a member of a sovereign nation. Though it is not synonymous with citizenship, for rights granted under domestic law for domestic purposes, the United Kingdom, and thus the commonwealth, have traditionally used the words interchangeably.

== Acquiring Trinidadian and Tobagonian nationality ==
Trinidadian and Tobagonian is acquired through birth, registration, or naturalisation.

=== By birth/descent ===
- Persons who are born within the territory, except if the foreign parents have diplomatic immunity; or
- Persons who are born abroad to at least one parent who was born in Trinidad and Tobago.

=== By registration ===
Nationality by registration includes those who have familial or historic relationship affiliations with Trinidad and Tobago. Persons who acquire nationality by registration include:

- Commonwealth nationals, nationals of the Republic of Ireland, or British Protected Persons, after five years of residence in the territory;
- Foreign spouses of Trinidadian and Tobagonian nationals who have renounced previous nationality;
- Minors under age of eighteen who are legally adopted by a national of Trinidad and Tobago; or
- Any minor at the discretion of the Minister responsible for immigration.

=== By naturalisation ===
Ordinary naturalisation may be granted to adult persons of full capacity who satisfy the Minister responsible for citizenship that they are of good character, have adequate knowledge of the English language, and intend to reside in Trinidad and Tobago. Applicants must have resided in the country for a continuous period of 12 months immediately prior to application and must also have resided in Trinidad and Tobago, or performed government service, or a combination of both, for at least five years within the seven years preceding that 12-month period. Upon approval, applicants must take the Oath of Allegiance. In certain cases, the Minister may require renunciation of previous citizenship.

== Loss of nationality ==
Nationals may voluntarily renounce their affiliation with Trinidad and Tobago, if the declarant is a legal adult and of full capacity. Renunciation may not be accepted if the country is in a war with the proposed new source of nationality. Denaturalisation may occur if a person obtained nationality through fraud, false representation or concealment. In the case of citizens by naturalisation or registration, citizenship can be affected if they subsequently and voluntarily acquire another citizenship.

== Dual nationality ==
Dual nationality in Trinidad and Tobago has been recognized since 29 July 1988, for nationals by birth or descent. It is also generally permitted for citizens through naturalisation or registration, without a requirement to renounce a previous nationality at the time of acquisition. However, naturalised or registered citizens may be restricted from certain high public offices, and constitutional provisions may affect citizenship status or eligibility in specific circumstances involving the subsequent acquisition of another nationality.

== History ==
=== Spanish, Dutch, and French colonial period (1498–1802) ===
On Christopher Columbus' fourth voyage in 1498, he landed on Trinidad and sighted Tobago, which was known by various Spanish names including Bella Forma, Isla de Asunción, Isla de Concepción and Isla de Magdalena. Until 1530, when a governor, Antonio Sedeño, was appointed, Trinidad was neglected by the crown. That year, Sedeño landed on Trinidad and built a small fort on the Paria Peninsula of Venezuela, but left it to secure reinforcements. In his absence, the fort was occupied in 1531 by Diego de Ordaz who explored the area, but then abandoned it and moved on to Cubagua. In 1580, Antonio de Berrío y Oruña inherited from his wife's uncle, Gonzalo Jiménez de Quesada, a royal decree allowing exploration of the Llanos, bounded on the north by the Pauto River and by the Caquetá River to the south. The couple left Spain and arrived in Bogotá that year. Between 1584 and 1590, de Berrío explored the land in the Orinoco Delta. In 1591, de Berrío was appointed governor of Trinidad and the Orinoco, and soon after his arrival established the town of San Thomé de la Guayana, currently known as Guayana Vieja. De Berrío sent out an expedition of 40 men, led by Domingo de Vera e Ibargoyen, to establish the first settlement on Trinidad. On 15 May 1592 the group founded San José de Oruña. Though Spain attempted to establish settlements on Tobago in 1591 and 1614, none were successful.

Nationality in the Spanish Empire was based in custom, rather than law. People born in Spain or Spanish America were considered to be members of the community and those born outside of those territories, whether of Spanish descent or not, were considered to be foreigners. Typically, naturalization was interpreted as personal, something granted to an individual, who met specified criteria. The first provisions for foreigners to be allowed to operate in Spanish territories were known as Carta de naturaleza, established by royal decree in 1567. Naturalization gave an alien the same rights as a native, but did not change their legal status as a foreigner, and was only operable within the specific territory in which one was naturalized. In colonial Spanish America, as had been established by the Siete Partidas (Seven-Part Code) enacted by Alfonso X of Castile in the 13th century, families were organized with a male head of household, who controlled the power, required obedience, and provided support and protection. Married women were legally required to submit to their husband's authority to maintain family unity.

The defeat of the Spanish Armada, in 1588, led to Spanish decline as an international powerhouse, which was replaced by Dutch, English, and French merchants and explorers. By 1611, despite the Spanish monopoly on trade with their colonies, Dutch, English, and French ships were exchanging goods in Trinidad, and widespread participation in illegal trading with foreign powers thwarted government attempts to stop it. In 1628, the Dutch successfully colonized Tobago, which they renamed New Walcheren. They were repelled by the Kalinago people, rebuilt their colony, but were driven off by the Spanish in 1636, leading them to settle on the northern coast of Trinidad. In 1628, Philip Herbert, 4th Earl of Pembroke was granted Trinidad and Tobago by Charles I of England, but failing in his colonization attempt at Tobago in 1638, he sold his patent to Robert Rich, 2nd Earl of Warwick. After three failed attempts to settle there in 1639, 1642, and 1647, Rich sold his patent.

Jacob Kettler, Duke of Courland, in present-day Latvia, claimed to have been the silent purchaser. Kettler had first attempted to establish a colony on Tobago in 1639, but it failed after repeated attacks by the indigenous Kalina people and Kalinago from neighboring islands. Courlanders attempted colonizations in Tobago again in 1642, 1645, 1649, and 1653. The last attempt finally resulted in success, when Jacobusstadt, near present-day Plymouth, was founded in 1654. Shortly thereafter, Adrian and Cornelius Lampsins from Middelburg and Vlissingen in the southwestern Netherlands, established a colony in Tobago, agreeing to recognize the Duke of Courland and pay him an annual tribute. The following year, the Dutch Parliament granted the Lampsins patents for Tobago and the rights of development and exploration. As both the Dutch and Courlander settlements were primarily founded as commercial enterprises, nationality did not play a large role in the governance. Roman-Dutch common law, per the Order of Government (Dutch: Ordre van Regieringe) of 1629, was the foundation of the legal code in the colonies, and there was no national civil law defining the rights or obligations of inhabitants. The Duke of Courland granted three years of duty-free trade, after which customary fees were required. Slaves were to be purchased from him and he granted foreigners the rights to reside in the colony if they pledged allegiance to him.

During the civil war in Courland, Kettler was imprisoned in Sweden, and the Dutch took over Tobago in 1660, transporting the remaining Corlanders back to Europe and promising to return the settlement to the duke if he regained his freedom. French settlement had been increasing on the island and they had settled primarily in the Courlander territory and in 1662 Louis XIV of France granted his patronage and the Barony of Tobago to Cornelius Lampsins. In 1664, Charles II of England entered into a secret agreement with Kettler to retake control of Tobago from the Dutch, but the Dutch learned of the plan. In 1665, the Second Anglo-Dutch War broke out and aided by the French, the Dutch were victorious. Under the terms of the 1667 Treaty of Breda all colonies returned to their previous owners, restoring Tobago to the Dutch, without mention of the Courlander or French claims to the island. In 1668, Kettler initiated a legal action in The Hague to reclaim his colony, but eventually abandoned the claim. In 1672, the British attacked the Dutch settlements on Tobago, as a first Caribbean assault in the Third Anglo-Dutch War. At the close of the war in 1674, terms of the Second Peace of Westminster returned Tobago to the Dutch. The Dutch would remain in control of Tobago until 1678, when it passed to France at the conclusion of the Franco-Dutch War.

The Ancien Régime of France developed a system of feudal allegiance in which subjects were bound together by a scheme of protection and service tied to land ownership. Possession of land was typically tied to military and court service and omitted women because they could not perform those obligations. Thus, French nationality derived from place of birth in French territory, until the nineteenth century, but under feudal law married women were subjugated to the authority of their husbands under coverture. As a part of the French Empire, the colonies in the French Antilles were subject to the provisions of the Code Noir decreed by Louis XIV in 1685. The Code was designed to control the social relations between blacks and whites in the Caribbean. It provided naturalization for freed persons and contained provisions for manumission and emancipation of slaves. Though it did not prohibit the marriage of blacks and whites, the Code carried substantial fines and penalties for owners who produced illegitimate children with slaves. Marriage to a slave woman in a church, automatically manumitted her and any children of the marriage. Children followed the status of the mother, regardless of the father's status, thus if she was a slave her children were slaves and if she was free her children were free.

Between 1678 and 1760, an agreement existed between the English and French that they would not exercise claims of sovereignty over Dominica, Saint Lucia, Saint Vincent, or Tobago, leaving them largely as neutral territories under the control of the indigenous populations. Neutrality did not mean that the islands were uncontested spaces, as conflict repeatedly broke out between the British, French, and Kalinago people inhabiting the islands. By the 1750s, British administrators began complaining about the French settlers who were encroaching the neutral lands. Though the French tried to dislodge them by offering incentives to return to other French-controlled islands, they were unsuccessful. Negotiations continued until the outbreak of the Seven Years' War in 1756. Under terms of the 1763 Treaty of Paris, Tobago was awarded to Britain and was reportedly uninhabited, though in 1757, 300 indigenous and 8 or 9 French families had been living there. The British designated Tobago as a dependency of Grenada and began to sell land there in 1765. Within five years, the population included 29 white women, 209 white men, and 3,146 slaves. During the American Revolutionary War Tobago was returned to the French, in 1783.

While Tobago changed hands many times, Trinidad remained in Spanish control, though it was neglected and remained largely undeveloped. Though no specific action by governments was taken against the Spanish, individuals from other European countries raided the territory. In 1718, cacao trees were discovered on the island and began to be cultivated, but population growth was slow. In 1772, the population of the capital, San José de Oruña, was only 743 persons, which was broken down as 417 Amerindians and 326 Spaniards. In 1777, Philippe-Rose Roume de Saint-Laurent, a planter from Grenada, proposed to the French king, Louis XVI, the idea of transplanting settlers from the other islands of the French Antilles to Trinidad because of the natural disasters plaguing them. The proposal was submitted to the Spanish crown and accepted. In 1783, Charles III of Spain issued a decree, known as the Population Order (Spanish: Cédula de población), which allowed Roman Catholics willing to take an oath of allegiance to Spain to settle in Trinidad, regardless of gender or race, and gave them incentives for developing trade and industry. After five years residency, settlers and their children were eligible for naturalisation. In 1789, a slave code was implemented under the Governor José María Chacón, providing requirements for housing and rations, labor, social organization, punishment, religious instruction, and general care of children and aged slaves unable to work. Under these measures, the population on the island grew to 17,643 by 1797. That year, the British captured Trinidad during the French Revolutionary Wars and was formally awarded the island in 1802 by the Treaty of Amiens.

=== British colonial period (1802–1962) ===
At its acquisition, Trinidad became a crown colony, but with the proviso that Spanish law be retained until a free election could be held to determine its governance. Tobago was restored to British control in 1814 under the terms of the Treaty of Paris, which ended the Napoleonic Wars, with similar provisions to retain French law. In Britain, allegiance, in which subjects pledged to support a monarch, was the precursor to the modern concept of nationality. The crown recognized from 1350 that all persons born within the territories of the British Empire were subjects. Those born outside the realm — except children of those serving in an official post abroad, children of the monarch, and children born on a British sailing vessel — were considered by common law to be foreigners. Marriage did not affect the status of a subject of the realm. Unlike other colonial powers with slave societies in the Caribbean, the British did not have a single overarching slave code. Each British colony was allowed to establish its own rules about the slave trade. Other than common law, there was no standard statutory law which applied for subjects throughout the realm, meaning different jurisdictions created their own legislation for local conditions, which often conflicted with the laws in other jurisdictions in the empire. Nationality laws passed by the British Parliament were extended only to the Kingdom of Great Britain, and later the United Kingdom of Great Britain and Ireland.

In 1807, the British Parliament passed the Slave Trade Act, barring the Atlantic slave trade, though not slavery itself, in the empire. During the War of 1812, British forces acquired liberated slaves and freedmen who had fought on the side of the British during the conflict with the United States. These refugees were taken to Trinidad and settled there between 1815 and 1819. The villages in which they were settled were largely in unpopulated spaces and facilitated the building of roads in the territory. The 1833 Emancipation Act abolished slavery and converted slaves into apprentices and remained bound to their former owners for four years if they had worked in the home and for six years if they had been field labourers. The apprenticeship programme was abandoned in 1838 because administrators were concerned about problems with granting freedom to only a portion of the population. Though free, there was never a British plan to give former slaves a voice in Parliament, leaving them as British subjects in a highly stratified system of rights. Denied political and economic rights, former slaves were not entitled to formal recognition as nationals by other nations. The abolition of slavery resulted in a plantation labor shortage, which planters solved in 1845 by beginning the practice of importing indentured laborers from the British Raj. To discourage marriages conducted under non-Christian rites, unions conducted under Hindu or Muslim rites were considered invalid and children born to such marriages were illegitimate. Finally in 1856, Ordinance 3, legalised marriages of indentured workers only if they were registered.

In 1833, Tobago, along with Barbados, Grenada, and Saint Vincent were joined in the British Windward Islands colony, though each territory had its own Legislative Assembly. Saint Lucia was added to the colony in 1838, though it was a crown colony and was administered through the British government. In 1876, both Grenada and Saint Vincent suspended their representative governments and became crown colonies and the following year, Tobago became a crown colony. In 1885, Barbados withdrew from the Windward Colony and the governorship was moved to St. George's, Grenada and in 1889 Tobago withdrew when it was merged with Trinidad. In 1911, at the Imperial Conference a decision was made to draft a common nationality code for use across the empire. The British Nationality and Status of Aliens Act 1914 allowed local jurisdictions in the self-governing Dominions to continue regulating nationality in their territories, but also established an imperial nationality scheme throughout the realm. The uniform law, which went into effect on 1 January 1915, required a married woman to derive her nationality from her spouse, meaning if he was British, she was also, and if he was foreign, so was she. It stipulated that upon loss of nationality of a husband, a wife could declare that she wished to remain British and provided that if a marriage had terminated, through death or divorce, a British-born national who had lost her status through marriage could reacquire British nationality through naturalisation without meeting a residency requirement. The statute reiterated common law provisions for natural-born persons born within the realm on or after the effective date. By using the word person, the statute nullified legitimacy requirements for jus soli nationals. For those born abroad on or after the effective date, legitimacy was still required, and could only be derived by a child from a British father (one generation), who was natural-born or naturalised. Naturalisations required five years residence or service to the crown.

Amendments to the British Nationality Act were enacted in 1918, 1922, 1933 and 1943 changing derivative nationality by descent and modifying slightly provisions for women to lose their nationality upon marriage. Because of a rise in statelessness, a woman who did not automatically acquire her husband's nationality upon marriage or upon his naturalisation in another country, did not lose their British status after 1933. The 1943 revision allowed a child born abroad at any time to be a British national by descent if the Secretary of State agreed to register the birth. Under the terms of the British Nationality Act 1948 British nationals in Trinidad and Tobago were reclassified at that time as "Citizens of the UK and Colonies" (CUKC). The basic British nationality scheme did not change overmuch, and typically those who were previously defined as British remained the same. Changes included that wives and children no longer automatically acquired the status of the husband or father, children who acquired nationality by descent no longer were required to make a retention declaration, and registrations for children born abroad were extended.

In 1958, Trinidad and Tobago joined the West Indies Federation. The federation, which included Barbados, the British Leeward Islands, the British Windward Islands, Jamaica, and Trinidad and Tobago, was typically seen by its supporters as a means to use a federal structure to gain national independence and eventual recognition as a Dominion. The federation was unable to develop a unified nationality scheme, as member states tended to identify with their specific island, rather than by region. The federation collapsed in 1962, with Jamaica withdrawing first and Trinidad and Tobago following its lead. As soon as it became evident that the federal structure had failed, Trinidad and Tobago began to pursue independence, which was attained that same year.

=== Post-independence (1962–present) ===
Trinidad and Tobago became independent on 31 August 1962. Generally, persons who had previously been nationals as defined under the classification of "Citizens of the UK and Colonies", would become nationals of Trinidad and Tobago on Independence Day and cease to be British nationals. Exceptions were made for persons to retain their British nationality and status if they (or their father or grandfather) were born, naturalised, or registered in a part of the realm which remained on 31 August part of the United Kingdom or colonies, or had been annexed by such a place. Other exceptions included that women did not cease to be CUKCs unless their husband did. At independence, children could only derive nationality from their father or paternal grandfather and husbands were unable to derive nationality from a wife. Those who had been registered or naturalised prior to independence in the former colony had to re-register as a citizen within five years and renounce any other citizenship. Dual nationality was not permitted at the time of independence. Subsequently, Trinidad and Tobago passed the 1976 Citizenship Act, which removed gender disparities, and provided for nationality by adoption. That same year, the Constitution was modified and Trinidad and Tobago became a republic, but remained within the Commonwealth.
