= History of Tobago =

History of the island of Tobago, Trinidad and Tobago

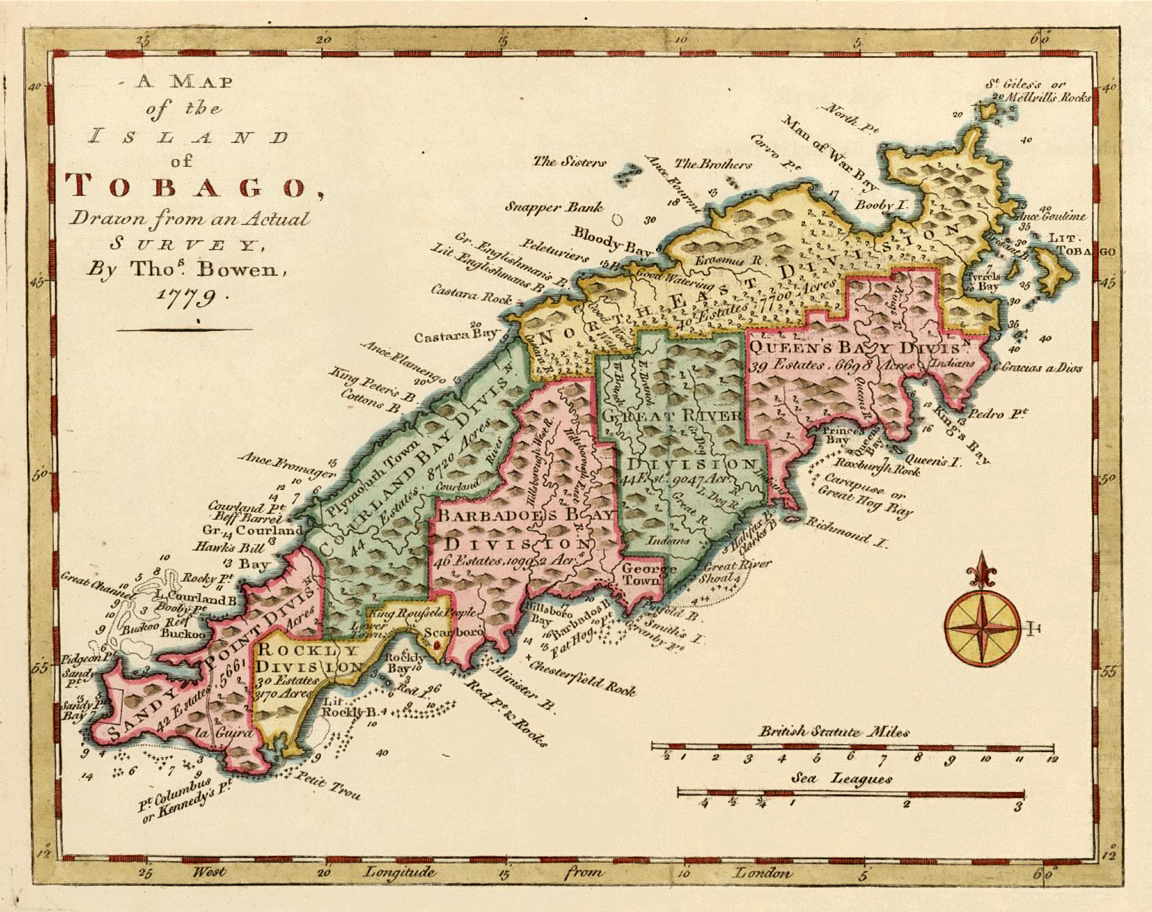
1779 map of Tobago by Thomas Bowen

The history of Tobago covers a period from the earliest human settlements on the island of Tobago in the Archaic period, through its current status as a part of the Republic of Trinidad and Tobago. Originally settled by indigenous people, the island was subject to Spanish slave raids in the sixteenth and early seventeenth century and colonisation attempts by the Dutch, British, French, and Courlanders beginning in 1628, though most colonies failed due to indigenous resistance. After 1763 Tobago was converted to a plantation economy by British settlers and enslaved Africans.

Tobago came under French control in 1781 during the Anglo-French War, returned to British control in 1793 during the War of the First Coalition, but was returned to France in 1802. The island was recaptured by the British in 1803, and remained under their control until independence in 1962.

The economy in the late eighteenth and early nineteenth centuries was entirely dependent on slavery, and most aspects of the lives of enslaved Tobagonians were governed by the Slave Act. The end of slavery came in 1838; coupled with a lack of money to pay labourers, Tobago planters resorted to metayage, a form of sharecropping, which remained the dominant mode of production until the end of the nineteenth century.

Declining sugar prices led to Tobago's consolidation with other British colonies in the Caribbean and the end of internal self-government. In 1889 Tobago was combined with Trinidad to form the colony of Trinidad and Tobago, which gained independence in 1962. Internal self-government was re-established in 1980 with the creation of the Tobago House of Assembly.

== First Tobagonians ==
Tobago was first settled in the Archaic period by people who probably originated in Trinidad. The oldest settlements are in the southwest of the island near the Bon Accord Lagoon, and belong to a culture known as the Milford complex, which was named for the shell midden near Milford, Tobago. These first Tobagonians were hunters and gatherers (possibly "incipient horticulturalists") who relied on, and probably managed, a range of edible roots, palm starch, and seeds. They fished and hunted sea turtles, shell fish, crabs and land mammals (primarily collared peccaries and agoutis). Culturally, they have been associated with the Ortoiroid people. No pottery remains have been found at Ortoiroid sites.

The age of archaeological sites associated with the Milford complex have not has not been established with much precision. Artefacts found at the Milford site and other stone artefacts found elsewhere in southwestern Tobago have been dated to between 3500 and 1000 BCE. The similarities between these artefacts and ones from more completely studied sites at St. John and Banwari Trace in Trinidad led Dutch archaeologist Arie Boomert to conclude that the actual age of the Milford complex sites in Tobago is likely to be on the older end of the date range.

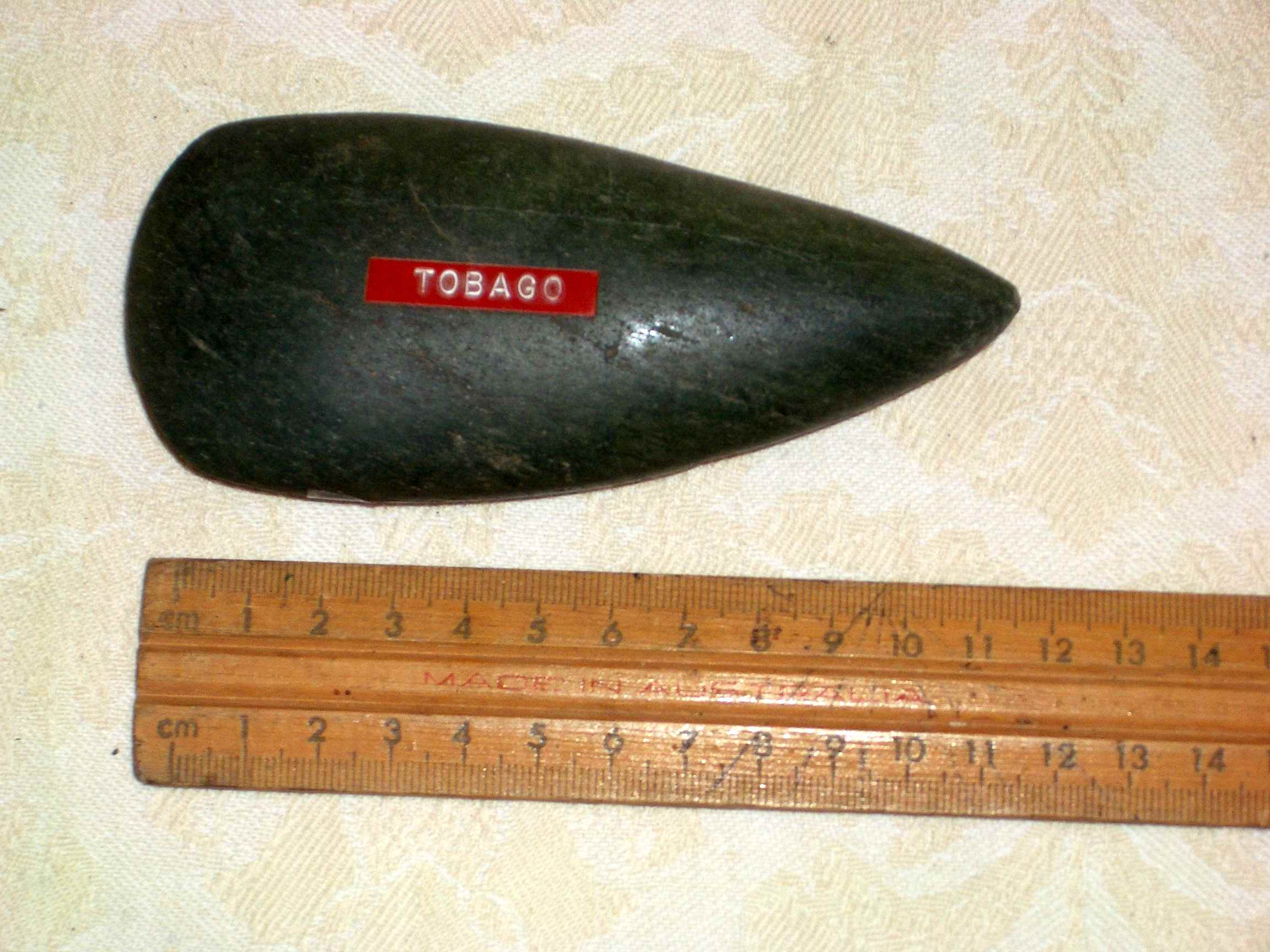
Greenstone ceremonial axe from shell midden at Mt. Irvine Bay

In the first century of the Common Era, Saladoid people settled in Tobago. Like the Ortoiroid people who preceded them, these Saladoid people are believed to have come from Trinidad. They brought with them pottery-making and agricultural traditions, and are likely to have introduced crops which included cassava, sweet potatoes, Indian yam, tannia and corn. Saladoid cultural traditions were later modified by the introduction of the Barrancoid culture. People of the Barrancoid culture settled in the Orinoco Delta by about 350 CE and settled in south Trinidad starting around 500 CE, resulting in a cultural exchange that modified the pottery styles in Trinidad. Elements of this culture made it to Tobago, either by trade or a combination of trade and settlement.

After 650 CE, the Saladoid culture was replaced by the Troumassoid tradition in Tobago. While Tobago and Trinidad were culturally connected during the Saladoid period, there was now a cultural split as the Arauquinoid tradition became established in Trinidad, while Tobago became culturally aligned with the Windward Islands and Barbados. Diets remained similar to the Saladoid times, but the remains of collared peccaries are rarer, which archaeologists have interpreted as evidence of over-hunting of the relatively large mammals. Troumassoid traditions were once thought to represent the settlement of the Island Caribs in the Lesser Antilles and Tobago, but this is now associated with the Cayo ceramic tradition. No archaeological sites exclusively associated with the Cayo tradition are known from Tobago.

== Early historic period ==
Tobago was seen by Christopher Columbus on 14 August 1498, during his third voyage. Columbus did not land, but named the island Belaforme, "because from a distance it seemed beautiful". Spanish friar Antonio Vázquez de Espinosa recorded that the Kalina (mainland Caribs) called the island Urupaina because of its resemblance to a big snail, while the Kalinago (Island Caribs) called it Aloubaéra, believed to be a reference to the fact that it resembled alloüebéra, the giant snake which was supposed to live in a cave on the island of Dominica. The name Tabaco was first recorded in a Spanish royal order, issued in 1511. This name references the shape of the island, which resembles the fat cigars smoked by the Taíno inhabitants of the Greater Antilles.

Tobago's position between the Lesser Antilles and the South American mainland made it an important point of connection between the Kalinago of the Lesser Antilles and their Kalina allies and trading partners in the Guianas and Venezuela. In the 1630s Tobago was inhabited by the Kalina, while neighbouring Grenada was shared by the Kalina and Kalinago.

The Spanish raided Tobago to provide slave labour to the pearl fisheries in Margarita. This was authorised under a 1511 Spanish royal order which allowed the Spanish of Hispaniola to wage war on and enslave the inhabitants of the Windward Islands, Barbados, Tobago and Trinidad. After the establishment of a permanent Spanish settlement in Trinidad in 1592, Tobago became the focus of their slave raids. Spanish slave raids from Margarita and Trinidad continued until at least the 1620s, decimating the island's population.

=== Early European settlements ===
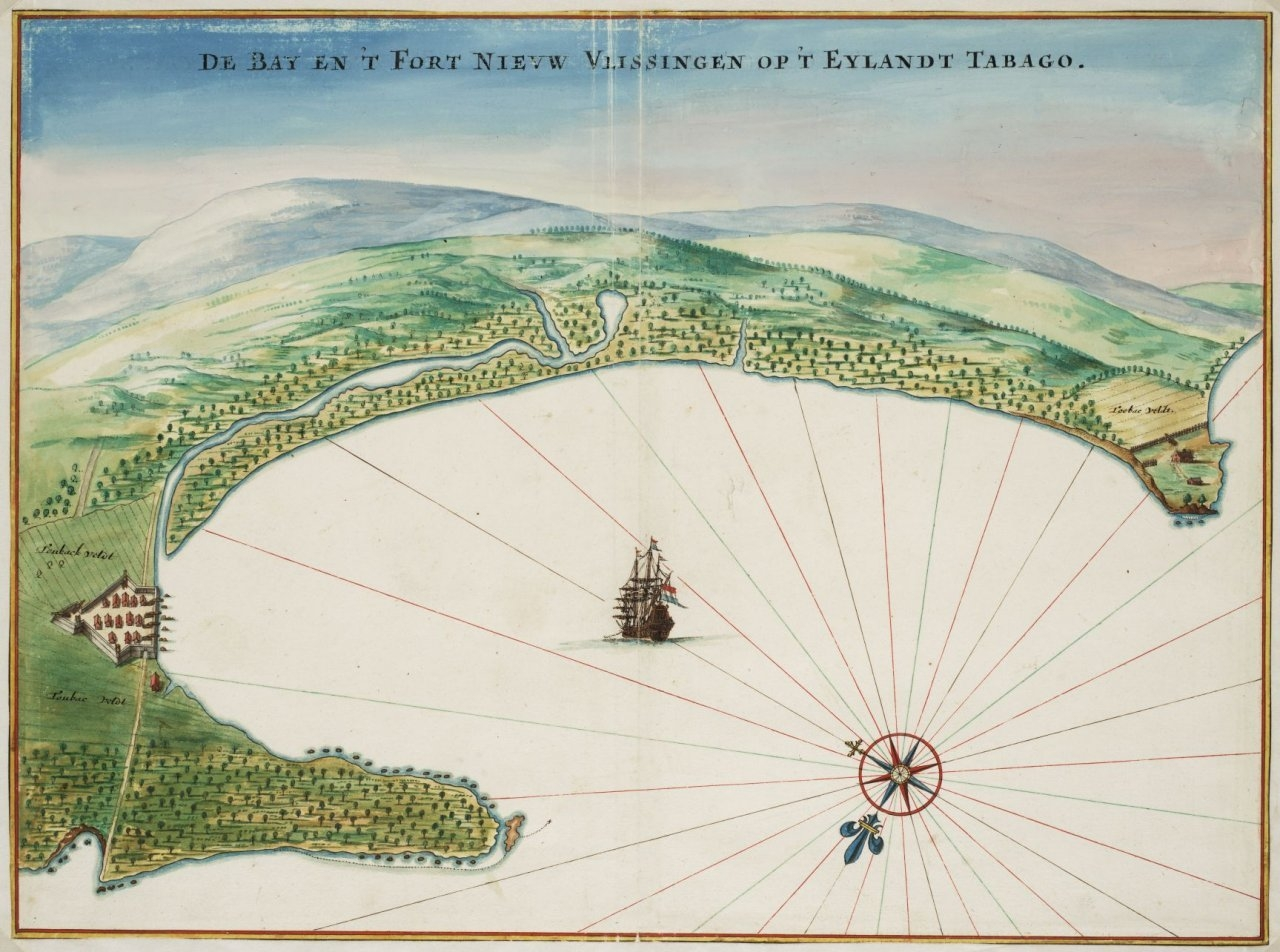
Seventeenth-century map showing the fort of Nieuw Vlissingen.

In 1628 Jan de Moor, the burgomaster of Vlissingen in the Netherlands, acquired the rights to colonise Tobago from the Dutch West India Company. He established a colony of a hundred settlers called Nieuw Walcheren at Great Courland Bay and built a fort, Nieuw Vlissingen, near the modern town of Plymouth. The goal of the colony was to grow tobacco for export, but the colonists were also permitted to trade with the indigenous inhabitants.

The indigenous inhabitants of Tobago were hostile to the colonisers; in 1628 a visiting warship from Zeeland lost 54 men in an encounter with a group of Amerindians whose identity was not recorded. The town was also subject to attack by Kalinago from Grenada and St. Vincent. The colony was abandoned in 1630, but was reestablished in 1633 by a fresh group of 200 settlers. The Dutch traded with the Nepoyo in Trinidad and established fortified trading posts on the east and south coasts of that island. They allied with Hierreyma, a Nepoyo chief, in his rebellion against the Spanish. In retaliation, the Spanish destroyed the Dutch outposts in Trinidad before gathering a force which captured the Dutch colony in Tobago in December 1636. In violation of the terms of their surrender agreement, all but two of the Dutch prisoners were shipped to Margarita, where almost all of them were executed.

English settlers from Barbados attempted to establish a colony in Tobago in 1637, but they were attacked by Caribs shortly after their arrival and the colony was abandoned. This was followed by a series of attempts to settle the island by colonists under the patronage of the Earl of Warwick. In 1639 a group of "a few hundred" settlers established a colony, but they abandoned it in 1640 after attacks by Kalinago from St. Vincent. A new group of colonists arrived in 1642 and established tobacco and indigo plantations. This settlement was abandoned as a consequence of Carib attacks and a shortage of supplies. A fourth English colony was established in 1646 but only lasted a few months.

=== Courlander and Dutch colonies ===
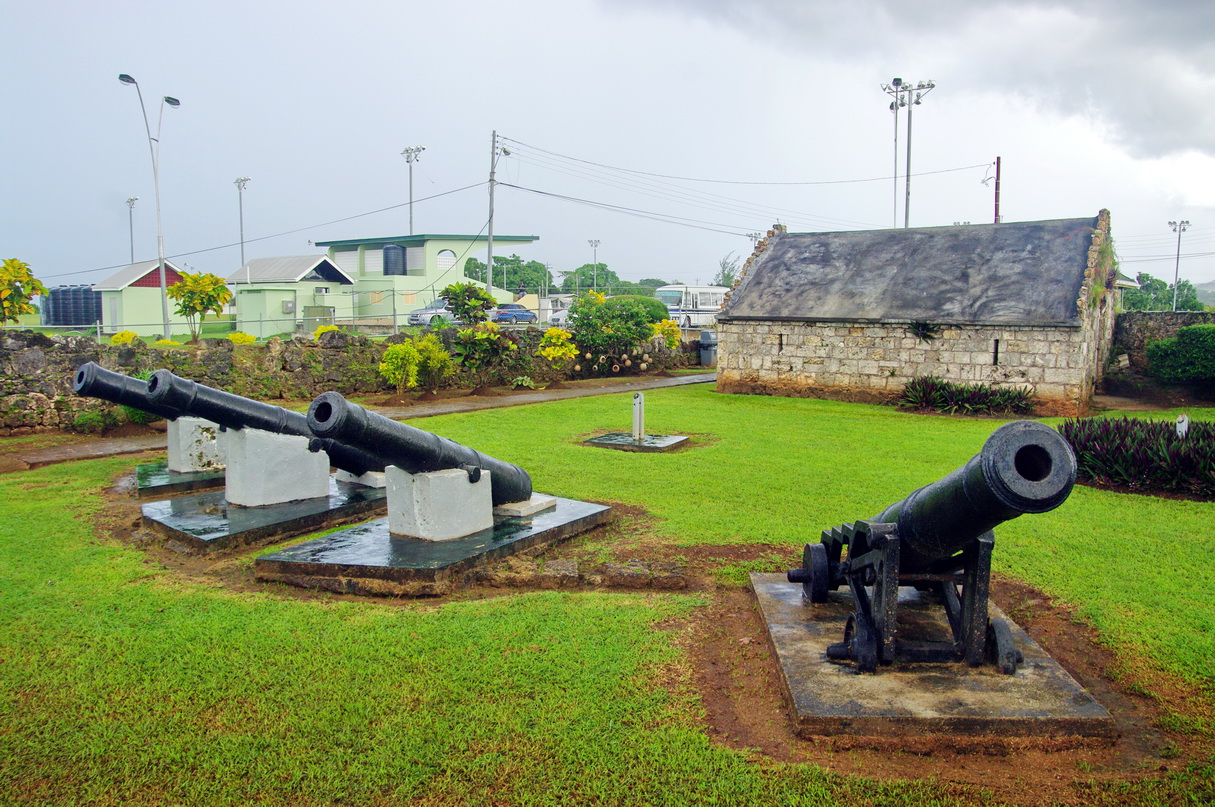
Fort James, formerly Fort Jacob, in Plymouth

Duke Friedrich Kettler of Courland tried to establish a colony on Tobago in 1639, but the colony failed. Duke Friedrich's successor, Jacob Kettler, made a second attempt in 1642 when he sent a few hundred colonists from Zeeland under the leadership of Cornelius Caroon. This settlement was attacked by Kalinago from St. Vincent and the survivors were evacuated to the Guiana coast by Arawaks from Trinidad.

A new colony was established on Great Courland Bay in 1654 near the ruins of the old Dutch fort at Plymouth. The fort was rebuilt and renamed Fort Jacobus. The settlement around the fort was named Jacobusstadt and included the first Lutheran congregation in the Caribbean. The settlers were a mixture of Dutch and Courlanders under the command of Willem Mollens, and they renamed the island Neu Kurland. A few months later, a Dutch colony was established on the other side of the island, under the patronage of brothers Adriaen and Cornelius Lampsins, who were wealthy merchants from Walcheren in Zeeland. The Dutch named their settlement Lampsinsstad, which was built on the site of the current capital, Scarborough. When the Courlanders discovered the presence of the Dutch colony, they attacked it and forced the Dutch settlers to accept Couronian sovereignty. Lampsinsstad grew through the arrival of Jews, French Huguenots, and Dutch planters from Brazil who brought African slaves and Amerindian allies with them after they were forced out of Brazil by the Portuguese. By 1662, the Dutch settlement had grown to 1250 white settlers and between 400 and 500 enslaved Africans.

The Courlander settlement attempted to maintain good relationships with the local Kalina population, but was attacked by Kalinago from St. Vincent and Arawaks from Trinidad. From a maximum of about 500 settlers, the colony shrank to 50 people by 1658. In 1659, while Courland was at war in Europe, the Dutch colony mutinied and took control of the island. Fort Jacobus was renamed Fort Beveren after Hubert van Beveren, governor of the Dutch colony.

In 1666, during the Second Anglo-Dutch War, Lampsinsstad was captured and looted by Jamaican buccaneers. The fort was occupied by English forces from Barbados and then captured by French forces from Grenada before being recaptured by the Dutch in 1667. New settlers from the Netherlands re-established the colony in 1668, but were attacked by Nepoyo from Trinidad. They were able to fend off the attacks with the help of Tobagonian Kalina, but were attacked again by Kalinago from St. Vincent. At the outbreak of the Third Anglo-Dutch War, the colony was captured and looted by Barbadians.

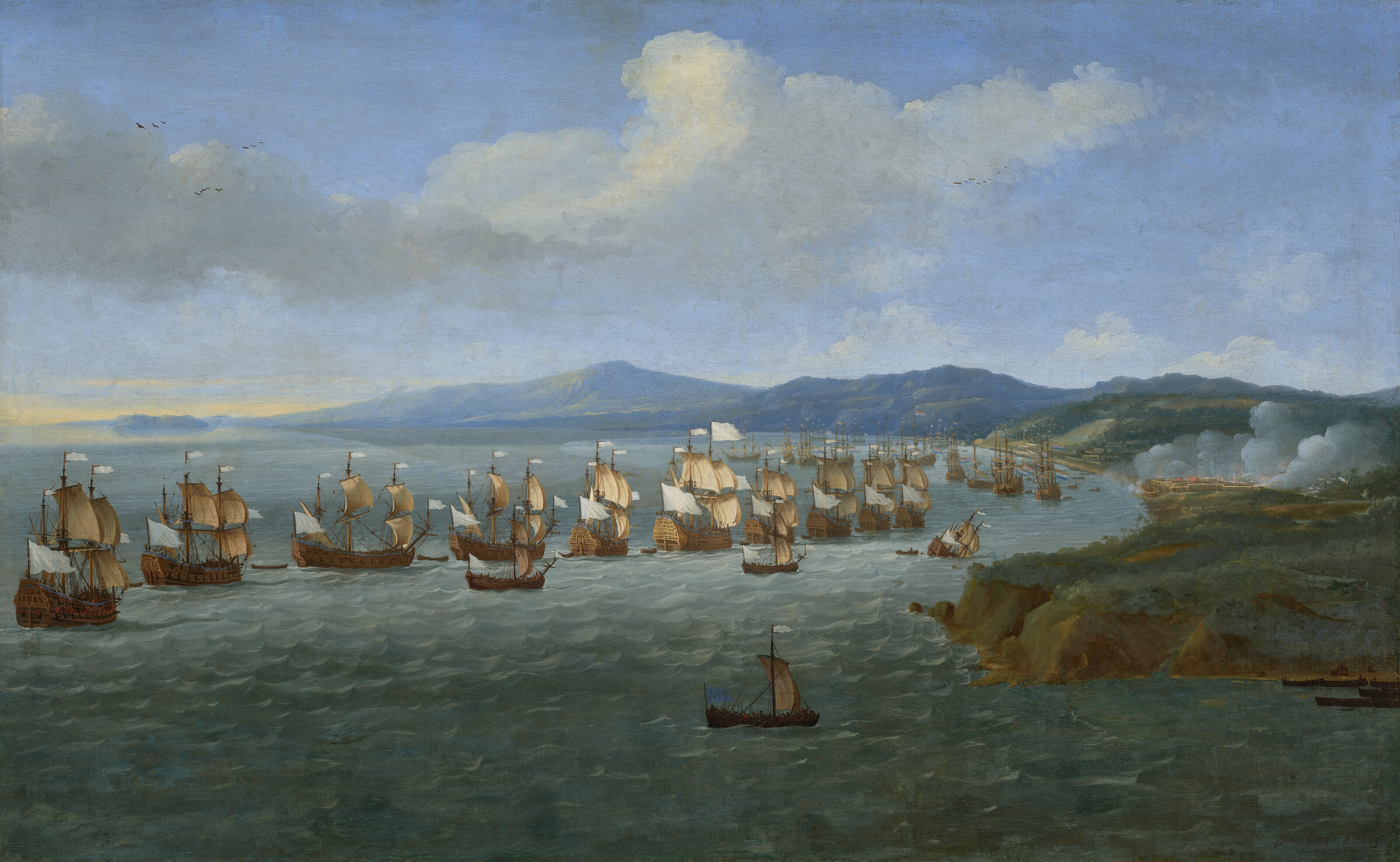
First Battle of Tobago, 3 March 1677

After the end of that war, a new Dutch colony was established in 1676, but was attacked by the French in March of the following year. The resulting naval battle resulted in serious losses on both sides, and the French forces withdrew, but returned the following year, captured the island, and destroyed the settlement. Fresh Courlander attempts to establish a colony in Tobago in 1680 and 1681 were abandoned in 1683. A final Courlander attempt to settle the island in 1686 was largely abandoned by 1687; the last mention of the colony was a small group of settlers encountered by a Danish ship in 1693.

=== Neutral Tobago ===
Claimed by both Britain and France, Tobago was left in the hands of its indigenous population after the 1690s. European settlement in Tobago had been "thwarted", to a large extent, by the combined resistance of the indigenous Kalina of Tobago and the mainland, and the Kalinago of the Lesser Antilles. The Treaty of Aix-la-Chappelle in 1748 designated Tobago neutral territory. Amerindians from Venezuela who sought to avoid being forced to settle in Capuchin mission villages, and Island Caribs from St. Vincent who sought to escape conflict with the Black Caribs, were among the groups who settled there in this period.

== Plantation economy ==
The Treaty of Paris in 1763 ended Tobago's status as a neutral territory and brought it under British control. A plantation economy was quickly established on the island. Under the direction of the Board of Trade, the island was surveyed, divided into 100–500 acres (40–202 ha) plots, and sold to planters. Between 1765 and 1771 over 50,000 acres (20,000 ha) of land were sold by the Crown for over £167,000. Through the efforts of Soame Jenyns, a commissioner of the Board of Trade and Member of Parliament, the upper portions of the Main Ridge were reserved as "Woods for the Protection of the Rains" and remained uncleared and uncultivated.

The former Dutch town of Lampsinsstad was renamed Scarborough in 1765, and was designated the capital of Tobago in 1779. To defend Scarborough, the British built Fort King George on a hill overlooking the town. The population of British settlers and enslaved Africans grew quickly, and production of sugar, cotton and cocoa grew significantly. A colonial constitution was granted and an elected House of Assembly was created, with each parish having one elected member. The government was under the control of the Governor-in-Chief of the Windward Islands, who was based in Grenada.

A credit crisis in the British economy in 1772 resulted in the bankruptcy of several of the merchant finance houses upon which the West Indian planters were dependent for credit. The sugar plantations depended on credit from these lenders to operate, and the loss of easy credit created hardships for the planters in Tobago. In 1776, they still owed the crown £69,000 for the land they had purchased, £30,000 in interest, with a further £740,000 owed to merchant houses. The outbreak of war between the American colonies exacerbated the problem by driving up shipping and insurance costs for the planters. The entry of France into the war in 1778 worsened the situation.

While the white and African populations grew quickly, the indigenous population declined. In 1777 there were "a few hundred" Amerindians, but in 1786 there were just 24. Many departed for the north coast of Trinidad, where they settled in the Toco area. The last records of Amerindians in Tobago are from Sir William Young, who served as Governor of Tobago until 1815.

=== French rule ===
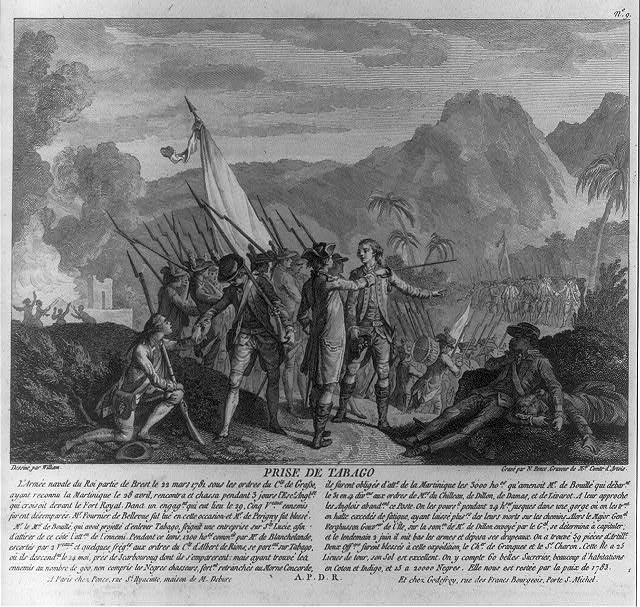
French invasion of Tobago, 1781

In 1781, as part of the Anglo-French War (an outgrowth of the American Revolutionary War), France captured Tobago. The island was ceded to France in 1783 under the terms of the Treaty of Paris, which left the existing constitution and laws in place and allowed the British inhabitants to retain their property and religion. The capital, Scarborough, was renamed Port Louis in 1787, and Fort King George was renamed Fort Castries.

Elections in 1784 left the Assembly in the control of British planters. In 1785 they refused funding for the island's government, arguing that their financial position was too precarious. In response to this, the French government demanded that the Assembly provide an annual payment of 200,000 livres tournois, which they agreed to in 1786.

A new Colonial Assembly was established with two elected members from each parish and two from Port Louis, and four unelected members—the governor and the three other senior government officials. Under this new structure, and with far less independence, the Assembly functioned primarily to approve edicts sent by the French government.

While some British settlers left the island after 1783, most remained, and there was little French emigration to the island, so the white population remained predominantly British. Between 1782 and 1790, the white population grew from 405 to 541, while the free coloured population (which included both black and those of mixed ancestry) rose from 118 to 303. The slave population grew from 10,530 to 14,171, mostly due to the importation of new slaves, as the death rate greatly exceeded the birth rate.

According to the census of 1790, the population of Tobago consisted of 15,019 people, 14,170 of whom were enslaved. The white population skewed male—434 of the 541 whites were male—while the free non-white population skewed female—198 of the 303 free people of colour were female, reflecting in part the fact that twice as many female slaves were manumitted as male slaves.

In 1785, cotton was the dominant crop in Tobago; 12,491 acres (5,050 ha) were dedicated to cotton cultivation and 1,584,000 pounds (718,000 kg) were exported. Sugar cane was cultivated on 4,241 acres (1,720 ha) and 1,102 long tons (1,120 t) of sugar and 133,600 imperial gallons (607,000 L) of rum were exported. By 1791, cotton exports had fallen to 516,000 pounds (234,050 kg) while sugar (1,991 long tons (2,023 t)) and rum exports (261,840 imperial gallons (1,190,300 L)) had almost doubled.

The French Revolution in 1789 caused a split between royalists and revolutionary sympathisers among the French inhabitants of the island. A new governor sent to restore royal authority in 1792 left for Grenada in 1793 and was replaced by a revolutionary governor.

=== Return to British control ===
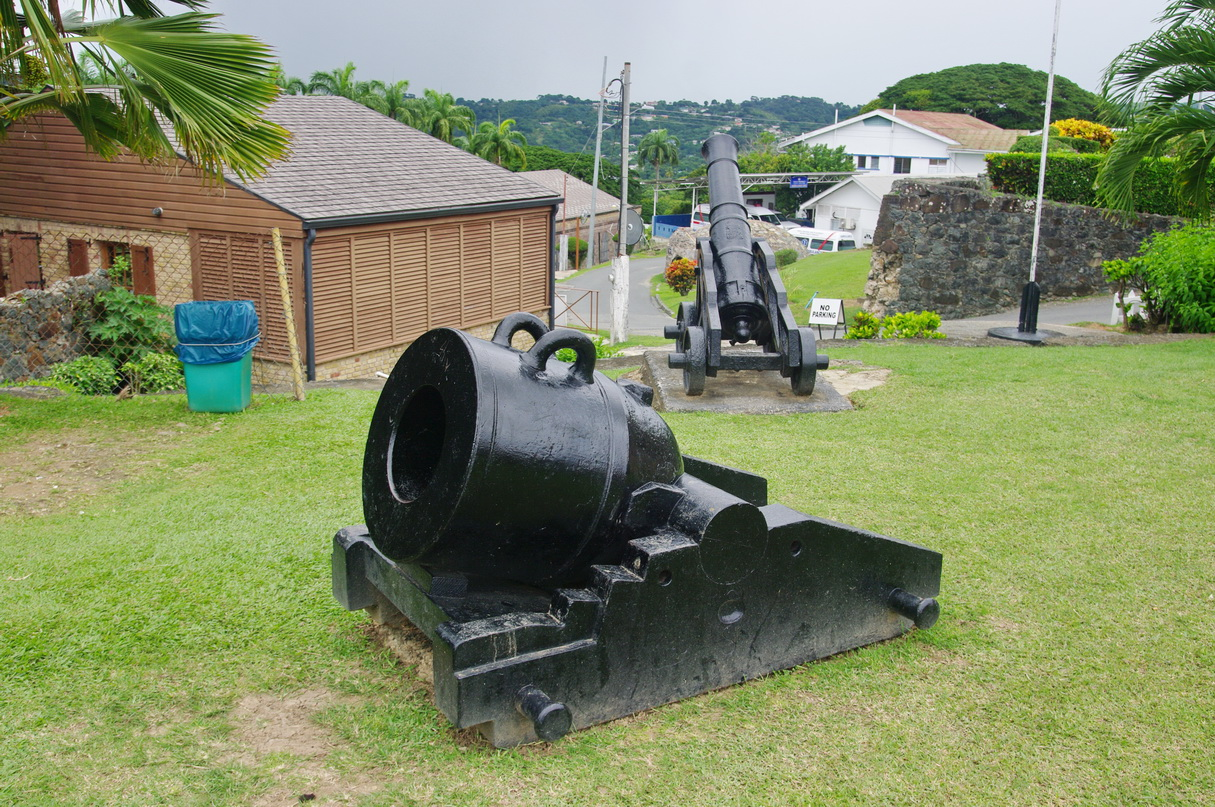
The French surrendered Tobago to the British after the fall of Fort Castries (now Fort King George) in April 1793.

The outbreak of war between Britain and Revolutionary France in 1793 allowed Britain to recapture the island. British forces from Barbados under the command of Cornelius Cuyler landed at Great Courland Bay on April 14 and attacked the French forces at Fort Castries. The French forces surrendered after a two-pronged attack by the British, and Cuyler reinstated the British colonial constitution that had been in place before the surrender to the French in 1781.

Tobago was returned to France in 1802 under the Treaty of Amiens, but recaptured by the British when war broke out again in 1803. France formally surrendered Tobago to Britain under the terms of the 1814 Treaty of Paris.

The Haitian Revolution resulted in the elimination of sugar exports from the former French colony of Saint-Domingue. Planters in Tobago were able to take advantage of this shortfall and greatly increased sugar production. In 1794, 5,300 long tons (5,390 t) of sugar were exported from Tobago, and this rose to a peak of 8,890 long tons (9,030 t) in 1799.

=== Slavery ===
The Tobagonian economy in the late eighteenth and early nineteenth century was completely dependent on slavery, both for plantation and domestic labour. Slaves also provided labour as artisans, on fishing boats and merchant ships, and helped man the island's defensive fortifications. Sugar production dominated the island's economy, and more than 90% of the enslaved population was employed on the sugar estates. The remainder were employed in Scarborough or Plymouth, largely as domestic servants.

The 1790 census recorded 14,170 enslaved people in Tobago. By 1797, the enslaved population rose to 16,190 and reached 18,153 in 1807, the year the slave trade was abolished. With the death rate among enslaved Tobagonians greatly exceeding the birth rate, the slave population declined to 16,080 by 1813.

Slavery was regulated by the Slave Act (formally An Act for the Good Order and Government of Slaves) of 1775. Slaves were considered property, with no intrinsic rights, but were in fact humans with "faculties of reasoning and will". The Slave Act, like other slave laws in the British West Indies, was designed to ensure that in the course of acting as humans, slaves did not cease to function as property. Striking or wounding a white person, wounding another slave, setting fire to sugar cane fields or buildings, or attempting to leave the island were all punishable by death, transportation, or any other punishment a magistrate might choose.

Slaves were required to carry passes authorising them to be away from their owner's plantation. If they were found without a pass, they could be arrested as runaways. Harbouring runaways was a crime, even for white people, and any plantation left abandoned for more than six months, and food crops growing on abandoned plantations, could be destroyed to prevent runaway slaves from gathering there.

Plantations were required to plant 1 acre (0.40 ha) of food crops for every five slaves to prevent food shortages. Over time, this was replaced by allowing slaves to cultivate their own provision grounds. Slaves were given Sundays and, on larger plantations, Thursdays, to work on their provision grounds and were allowed to eat or sell the production from these gardens as they chose. On plantations which allowed larger provision grounds, slaves were expected to use their own money to buy meat and fish. Where provision grounds were smaller, these were provided by the plantation owner. Urban slaves were unable to cultivate gardens, both because land was unavailable and, in the case of domestic workers, because they were not given the time to do so.

=== Emancipation and metayage ===
After peaking in 1799, sugar production experienced a long, slow decline. Income for planters fell more sharply as sugar prices fell from a high of 87 shillings per hundredweight in 1799 to less than half that (32 to 38 shillings) in 1807. The abolition of the slave trade in 1807 put further pressure on the planters; because the death rate among slaves exceeded the birth rate, the slave population was not self-sustaining. This drove up the cost of slaves, which impacted the cost of sugar production.

Declining sugar prices led to a downturn in the economy of the West Indian islands, including Tobago. After Emancipation in 1838, economic conditions did not improve; the price of sugar fell from about 34 shillings per hundredweight in 1846, to 23 shillings in 1846 and 21 shillings in 1854. The 1846 Sugar Duties Act removed protections for British West Indian sugar, forcing it to compete with foreign-grown sugar, which was cheaper to produce, and beet sugar, which was subsidised. The main revenue stream for the government of the island was customs duties, so the declining value of sugar exports meant declining revenue. In eleven of the 21 years between 1869 and 1889, the government operated at a deficit. The 1884 bankruptcy of A.M. Gillespie and Company, a London-based financier which had provided credit, marketing and shipping to many of the planters, was a severe blow to the economy of Tobago.

Given a lack of money to pay labourers, planters in Tobago resorted to metayage, a form of sharecropping which had been introduced to the Windward Islands by the French. In this system, planters provided the land, planting stocks, transport and machinery to manufacture sugar while the workers (metayers) provided the labour to cultivate and harvest the canes. In Tobago, metayers were frequently required to provide the labour to operate the sugar mill. The sugar produced was shared between the land-owner and the metayers. Normally, half the sugar went to the metayer, but if the land-owner provided a field of ratoons (resprouting canes that had been planted in a prior year) the metayer's share was only one-third to one-fifth of the sugar.

The system was first introduced in Tobago in 1843, and by 1845 it was generally adopted. While the system was largely abandoned in the other Windward Islands by the 1860s, it remained the dominant mode of production in Tobago until the end of the nineteenth century, when sugar production was finally abandoned.

== Union with Trinidad ==
As Tobago's economy declined, so did its importance to the British government. To reduce the cost of ruling the island, the British government sought to unite Tobago with neighbouring islands, into a single administrative unit. In 1833, Tobago, Grenada and St. Vincent were put under the authority of the Governor of Barbados, but this had little effect on the power of the Assembly. After Emancipation, the participation of the elected members in the business of the Assembly declined. Given limited participation and high rates of absence from the meetings, the Assembly voted to abolish itself in 1874 and replaced the bicameral legislature with a single chamber called the Elected Legislative Council. This chamber consisted of fourteen members, six of whom were nominated by the Governor and eight which elected by the planters. The planters initially objected to this reduction in their power, but this changed after the Belmanna riots in 1876. Faced with growing militancy by the black population, the planters voted to dissolve their representative government and convert the island to a Crown colony.

The collapse of London-based financier A.M. Gillespie and Company in 1884 further weakened the economy of Tobago. In 1885 the British government combined Tobago, Grenada, St. Vincent, and St. Lucia into a single entity, the Windward Islands. This was a loose union while combined the islands under a single governor, but left local institutions intact.

In 1887, the British Parliament passed the Trinidad and Tobago Act, which authorised the union of Trinidad and Tobago. The goal of the union was to pass the cost of administering Tobago from the British crown to the more prosperous colony of Trinidad. On 17 November 1888, the Act was proclaimed, and the union took effect on 1 January 1889. The islands were united under a single administrative structure, which was based in Port of Spain, and a single governor, who had formerly been the governor of Trinidad. The last vestige of self government, the Financial Board, consisted of three elected members, two members appointed by the governor, and a commissioner also appointed by the governor. The governor was able to dissolve the board without input from the people of Tobago. On the legal front, the Supreme Court in Trinidad gained authority over Tobago and had the power to appoint magistrates. Tobago's status was downgraded to that of a ward in 1899, with the warden of Tobago as the chief government official on the island.

The lack of Tobagonian representation on the Legislative Council led to calls for someone to be appointed to the council to represent the interests of Tobago. In 1920, Governor John Chancellor invited T. L. M. Orde, manager of the Louis D'Or Estate in Tobago, to serve on the council, but Orde declined the invitation because it would have required lengthy absences from the island. A.H. Cipriani, a Trinidad resident who owned large coconut estates in Tobago, was appointed to the position instead. Between 1920 and 1925, Tobago's interests were represented by residents of Trinidad. Black Tobagonians were willing to serve on the council, but the prospect was not acceptable to the political establishment.

=== Representation ===
In 1925, the Legislative Council was expanded from 21 to 25 members, including seven elected members. Its one elected member gave Tobago its first elected representatives since 1877, when Crown colony government had been instituted. Voting was limited to literate men who were 21 or older, and came with property and income requirements. Requirements for candidates were even higher. The elections took place on 7 February 1925. Only 5.9% of the population were eligible to vote, and in Tobago only 547 people out of 1,800 eligible voters actually participated. James Biggart, a black Tobagonian pharmacist, was elected to represent Tobago in the Legislative Council.

On the legislative council, Biggart campaigned for the development of infrastructure and education in Tobago, and the improvement of communications by sea between the islands. Biggart was able to improve infrastructure in Tobago and communications between the islands, and in 1925 Bishop's High School was established in Tobago by the Anglican Church, and received support in the form of a government grant. Biggart held the Tobago seat until his death in 1932. A white planter and businessman, Isaac A. Hope, won the by-election to succeed Biggart. In the 1938 elections Hope was replaced by George de Nobriga.

The County Council Ordinance of 1946 divided Tobago into seven wards, each represented by two councillors. The introduction of universal adult suffrage in 1946 saw the election of A.P.T. James to the Legislative Council. James was a strong advocate for Tobago and pushed for increased infrastructural development. He was successful in getting pipe-borne water, schools, health centres, a deep-water harbour, and, in 1952, electricity. He advocated for increased representation for Tobago in the legislature, for separate representation in the West Indies Federation, and, later, for full independence. James lost the 1961 general elections to A.N.R. Robinson, a founding member of the ruling People's National Movement (PNM).

=== Economy ===
After the union with Trinidad, the economy of Tobago remained underdeveloped. Most of the population consisted of peasant farmers who grew mostly food crops and supplemented their income working on the coconut and cacao estates that replaced sugar as the island's main export crops. Wages were extremely low, which allowed the plantation owners (primarily a group of fifty to sixty white families) to derive "substantial profits" even when commodity prices were very low.

In the 1930s, white planters began renting their estate houses and outbuildings to winter visitors, and later invested in hotels and guest houses. In the 1950s, tourism began to replace agriculture as Tobago's main employer and driver of economic activity.

== Independence and internal self-governance ==
In 1956, Crown colony government in Trinidad and Tobago was replaced by internal self-government. The 1956 general elections were a victory for the newly-formed People's National Movement, led by Eric Williams. Williams was appointed chief minister, but the governor remained head of the Executive Council. With the formation of the West Indies Federation in 1958, the Williams administration acquired more direct policy control over Trinidad and Tobago.

In 1958, a Department of Tobago Affairs was created, headed by a permanent secretary. In 1962, Trinidad and Tobago became an independent nation. In 1964, the Department of Tobago Affairs was raised to a cabinet-level position, and the Ministry of Tobago Affairs was created, in part to deal with the added responsibility of recovery from Hurricane Flora, which had devastated the island of Tobago in 1963.

=== Economic development ===
In 1957, Williams put forward the Tobago Development Program, an economic development plan designed to correct "many years of neglect and betrayal" of Tobago by the Trinidad-based administration. Successfully developing Tobago was seen as an important way to make the case for a leading role for Trinidad and Tobago in the West Indies Federation; by showing it was able to successfully advance Tobago's development, Williams intended to show how it could do the same for the other smaller members of the federation. While the Williams administration increased the development spending in Tobago relative to the previous administration, only about 3% of the 1957 budget was allocated to projects in Tobago. Between 1958 and 1962, Tobago's share of the development budget was also less than 7%, despite the goal that Tobago's development should be given high priority.

=== Hurricane Flora ===
On 30 September 1963, Tobago was hit by Hurricane Flora, resulting in 30 deaths. About half of the island's housing was damaged to the point of being uninhabitable. The main export crops–coconuts, cocoa and bananas–were badly damaged, as was a large part of the fishing fleet. Despite government investments in agricultural rehabilitation, the importance of the agricultural sector declined while tourism expanded. The number of hotel and guest house rooms increased from 185 in 1960 to 448 in 1972, to 651 by 1982.

=== Secession movement ===
Starting in 1969, Rhodil Norton, a medical doctor and president of the Buccoo Reef Association (an association of tour guides), began calling for Tobago to secede from Trinidad and Tobago. His calls drew strong opposition from Trinidadian society and the ruling PNM government, including Basil Pitt, the Member of Parliament (MP) representing the Tobago West seat. Other Tobagonians, while not advocating secession, supported the idea that Tobago was not treated equitably and that the central government had failed to keep its promises to Tobago.

Despite claims that Tobago was neglected, Tobagonians were well represented in government—both Pitt and Robinson (the MP for Tobago East) held ministerial positions in the PNM government, while the Prime Minister, Williams, held the portfolio of the Ministry of Tobago Affairs. In response to these calls for secession, the government expanded its investments in Tobago. Despite this, talk of secession continued. The Tobago Emancipation Action Committee, chaired by Norton, issued one such call for secession in 1970. This prompted the police to establish surveillance of the group.

=== Black Power movement ===
Independence left the economy dominated by the elites—in 1970, 75% of the best land in Tobago was reported to be in the hands of local elites or foreign owners. The continuation of colonial-era practices after independence led to disenchantment with the ruling PNM administration. Inspired by a combination of Marxism and Garveyism, the Black Power movement was a response to both racism and colonialism.

The arrest and trial of students from Trinidad and Tobago in the aftermath of the Sir George Williams affair in Montreal, Canada, triggered protests in Port of Spain which soon spread around the country. In Tobago, protestors demanded the end of strip-tease shows for tourists which employed local teenagers, and the restoration of public access to the beaches at Pigeon Point and Bacolet. Between 12,000 and 15,000 people took part in a march to Charlotteville, while school children in Roxborough organised an 18-mile (29 km) march to Scarborough.

On April 21, 1970, amid ongoing unrest, the Government of Trinidad and Tobago declared a state of emergency and arrested most of the leadership of the Black Power movement. When called upon to help restore order, the Trinidad and Tobago regiment mutinied, but the mutineers surrendered after ten days.

=== Rise of the DAC ===
On 20 September 1970, Robinson resigned from the PNM. His resignation came in the aftermath of the Black Power uprising earlier that year, and he cited abuse of power by the Prime Minister among his reasons for resignation. Robinson, who had been accused of putting his support for his party ahead of the interests of the people of Tobago, was freed from obligations to the former. He formed the Action Committee of Dedicated Citizens (ACDC) and joined forces with the opposition Democratic Labour Party (DLP) to contest the 1971 general elections. On 3 April 1971, ACDC reformed as a political party, the Democratic Action Congress (DAC), whose platform included a strong plan for economic development and self-government for Tobago. Over concerns about voting machines and irregularities in the election process, the DLP and DAC boycotted the 1971 elections and the PNM won all the seats in Tobago and Trinidad.

In the 1976 general elections, the DAC won both seats in Tobago; Robinson won the Tobago East seat while Winston Murray won Tobago West. Two months after the election, Williams disbanded the Ministry of Tobago Affairs, and transferred its responsibilities back to other government ministries. In Tobago, this was seen as an act of reprisal for the island's abandonment of the PNM.

=== Internal self-government ===
With the dissolution of the Ministry of Tobago Affairs, Robinson and Murray made the case in Parliament for internal self-government in Tobago. The main opposition party in Parliament, the United Labour Front, supported these efforts, and, after a long and contentious debate, the Tobago House of Assembly (THA) bill was passed on 12 September 1980. Elections on 24 November 1980 drew 63.5% of eligible voters, and gave the DAC eight of the 12 seats in the Assembly, with the PNM winning the other four. The Assembly met for the first time on 4 December 1980, and Robinson was elected chair of the THA.

The establishment of the THA provided internal self-government in Tobago, but the Assembly remained subject to the central government. The THA bill allowed the Assembly to be revoked by a two-thirds majority in Parliament, and left the THA financially dependent on allocations from the central government. A revised bill, Act 40 of 1996, gave permanent status to the THA, created the position of Presiding Officer, and gave the Chief Secretary the right to work directly with the Cabinet on issues related to Tobago.

== Robinson era ==
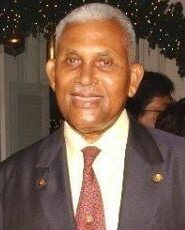
Between 1961 and 2003, A.N.R. Robinson served as a Member of Parliament, Cabinet Minister, Chairman of the Tobago House of Assembly, Prime Minister and finally President of Trinidad and Tobago.

Between 1980 and 2003, Castara–born A.N.R. Robinson played a dominant role in the politics and government of Trinidad and Tobago, first as Chairman of the THA, then Prime Minister, and finally as President of Trinidad and Tobago.

In the run-up to the 1981 general elections, the DAC, the ULF, and the Tapia House Movement resolved to work together to contest the election. The three parties fielded their own slates of candidates, but agreed not to contest the same seats. The DAC contested eight of the 36 seats in Parliament, but only won the two Tobago seats. After the election, the three parties formalised their relationship and operated under the banner of the Alliance. The Alliance formed an accommodation with a fourth party, the Organisation for National Reconstruction to contest the 1983 local government elections. On 8 September, 1985, the four constituent parties dissolved and formed a new party, the National Alliance for Reconstruction (NAR), with Robinson as its political leader. The NAR defeated the PNM in the 1986 general elections and Robinson became the third person to serve as Prime Minister of Trinidad and Tobago.

The Robinson administration invested heavily in Tobago, completing the Scarborough Deep Water Harbour and expanding the runway at the Crown Point Airport to accommodate larger jets and international air travel directly to Tobago. They also improved ferry service between Port of Spain and Scarborough.

Infighting in the NAR government and the 1990 Jamaat al Muslimeen coup attempt left the administration weakened, and it lost the 1991 general elections to the PNM, led by Patrick Manning. The NAR was left holding only the two Tobago seats. The 1995 general elections resulted in a 17–17 split between the Manning–led PNM and the United National Congress, led by Basdeo Panday; Robinson's NAR still held the two Tobago seats and with them, the ability to form a coalition government with either party. The NAR chose to work with the UNC and formed a coalition government, with Panday as Prime Minister and Robinson holding the position of Minister Extraordinaire with special responsibility for Tobago. In 1997, Robinson resigned from Parliament and was elected President of Trinidad and Tobago. He retired from the presidency in 2003.

== See also ==
- History of Trinidad and Tobago
- List of colonial governors and administrators of Tobago
