= Fort Jakob =

Fort Jakob, Jakob Fort, or Fort Jakobus may refer to:

- Fort Jakob (Tobago), a Courland colony
- Fort Jakob (Gambia), a Courland colony
