= Hubert de Beveren =

Governor of Tobago
- In office 1662–1666

Hubert de Beveren was the Dutch Governor of Tobago from 1662 to 1666. He was appointed by the brothers Lampsins once they became the Barons of Tobago, as granted by Louis XIV.

When de Beveren and the Dutch colonists arrived, the Couronian colonists were already living in Tobago. This led to some strife and minor conflict, but ultimately when Courland was occupied by Sweden in 1659, the colony fell into Dutch hands. The newly appointed Governor de Beveren integrated the Couronian colonists into the growing Dutch society on the island, and he was officially governor of New Courland.

His rule as governor was short, but was notable for being a period of peace and building, and many fortifications were erected on his authority.

In 1666 the English drove the Barons from Tobago and de Beveren lost his position as governor.

== See also ==
- Adrian Lampsins
- Cornelius Lampsins
- Couronian colonization of the Americas
