= Delaford-Louis d'Or-Lands Settlement =

- Locality
- Interactive map of Delaford-Louis d'Or-Lands Settlement
- Coordinates: 11°15′14″N 60°33′41″W
- Country: Trinidad and Tobago
- Island: Tobago

Population (2011)
  - Total: 907

Delaford-Louis d'Or-Lands Settlement is a town in Trinidad and Tobago, which is part of the parish of St. Paul, Tobago.

== Geography ==
The locality covers part of the island of Tobago and is bordered to the north by Betsy's Hope and Delaford, to the south and east by the Atlantic Ocean, and to the west by Betsy's Hope.

== Demography ==
Demographic data for the town of Delaford-Louis d'Or-Lands Settlement:

demographic vertical bar chart of Delaford-Louis d'Or-Lands Settlement between 2000 and 2011

== Politics ==
Delaford-Louis d'Or-Lands Settlement is part of the Tobago East constituency for elections to the Parliament of Trinidad and Tobago.

== See also ==
- List of cities and towns in Trinidad and Tobago
