= Charlottesville (disambiguation) =

Charlottesville is a city in the American state of Virginia.

Charlottesville may also refer to:

== Places ==
- Charlottesville, Indiana, a CDP in Hancock and Rush Counties
- Charlottesville, Iowa, a historic post office and town in Iowa
- Charlottesville, VA MSA, a U.S. Metropolitan Statistical Area in Virginia

== Facilities ==
- Charlottesville-Albemarle Airport, Virginia
- Charlottesville (Amtrak station), the Union Station; Charlottesville, VA
- Charlottesville High School; Charlottesville, VA

== Other uses ==
- USS Charlottesville (PF-25), U.S Navy frigate
- Charlottesville (horse)
- a metonym for the Unite the Right rally in Charlottesville, Virginia in August 2017.

== See also ==
- Charlotteville (disambiguation)
- Charlottsville, Pennsylvania
