= Guildford Town Centre Races =

Cycling race in Guildford, Surrey

The Guildford Town Centre Races is a cycling race in Guildford, Surrey, England organised as a criterium. The event is part of the National Circuit Series and organised by Charlotteville Cycling Club since 1984. The course is 1 kilometre, and takes place as an annual celebration of Charlotteville Cycling Club. The Guildford Town Centre Races have run almost annually every year since 1984, becoming part of the British Cycling National Circuit Series in 2023, part of the Rapha Super league in 2025 and now currently sponsored by Canyon.

The 2026 elite races were won by Madeline Cooper and Thomas Armstrong.

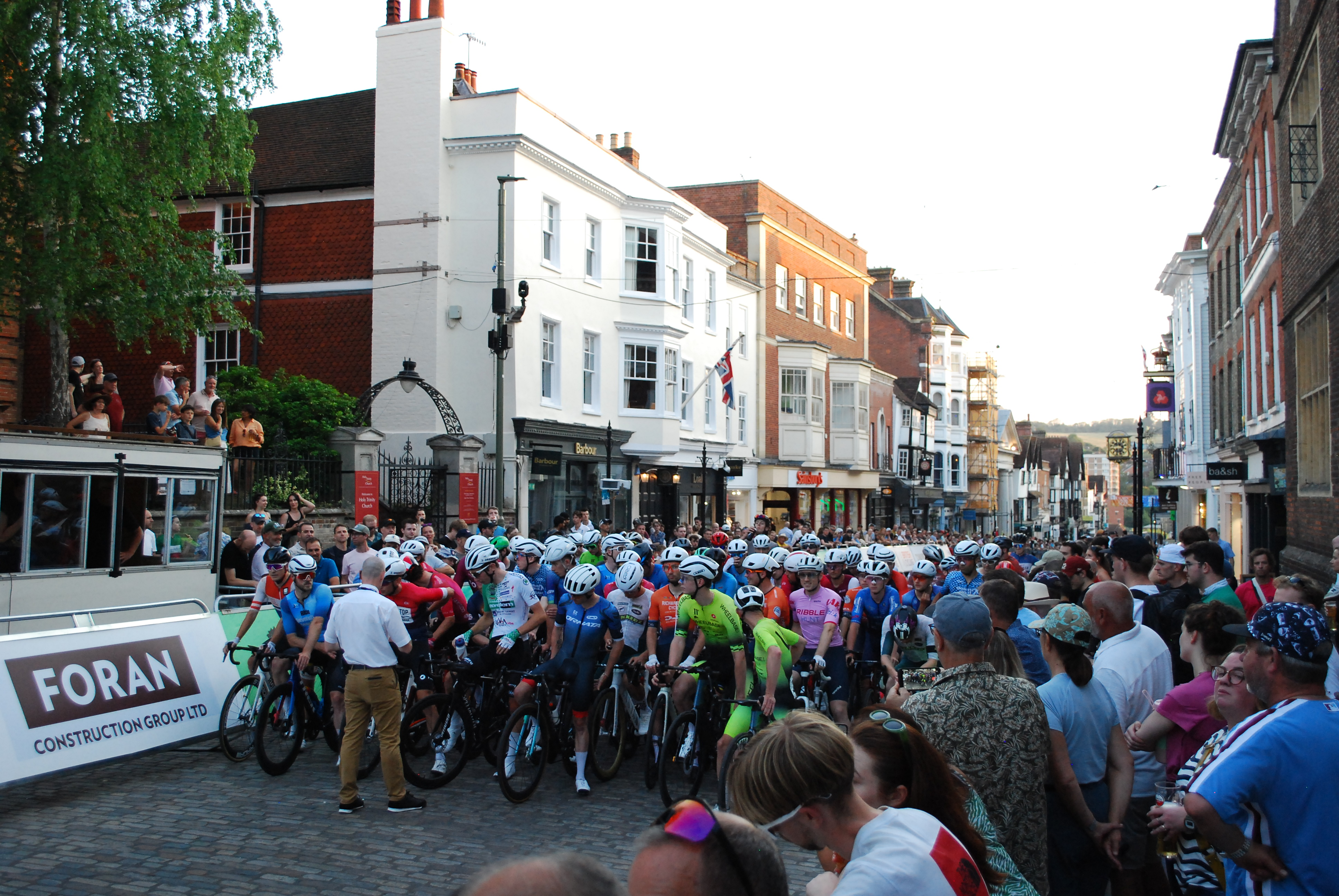
Start line of the Men’s Elite race at the 2026 Guildford Town Centre Races. Riders are lined up at the top of the high street.

== Past Winners ==
=== Elite Women ===
Year	Rider	Team
2019	Gina Ricardo	-
2020	Cancelled due to the global COVID-19	
2021	Lucy Lee	The Phoenix Collective
2022	Flora Perkins	Lifeplus Wahoo
2023	Alex Morrice	CANYON // SRAM zondacrypto
2024	Eilidh Shaw	Handsling Alba Development Road Team
2025	Robyn Clay	DAS-Hutchinson
2026	Madeline Cooper	Handsling Alba Development Road Team

=== Elite Men ===
Year	Rider	Team
2019	Rory Townsend	Canyon dhb p/b Bloor Homes
2020	Cancelled due to the global COVID-19	
2021	Maximilian Stedman	Canyon DHB Sungod
2022	Toby Barnes	AT85 Pro Cycling
2023	Ben Chilton	Ribble Collective
2024	Robert Scott	TEKKERZ CC
2025	Milo Wills	TEKKERZ CC
2026	Thomas Armstrong	Wheelbase CabTech Castelli
