= Delaford =

- Locality
- Interactive map of Delaford
- Coordinates: 11°15′59.4″N 60°33′18.36″W
- Country: Trinidad and Tobago
- Island: Tobago

Population (2011)
  - Total: 594

Delaford is a town in Trinidad and Tobago, which is part of the parish of St. Paul, Tobago.

== Geography ==
The locality covers part of the island of Tobago and is bordered to the north by Campbleton-Charlotteville and Top Hill (both localities belonging to the parish of St. Paul), to the south by Delaford-Louis d'Or-Lands Settlement and the Atlantic Ocean, to the east by King's Bay and to the west by Roxborough and Betsy's Hope.

== Demography ==
Demographic data for the town of Delaford:

demographic vertical bar chart of Delaford between 2000 and 2011

== Politics ==
Delaford is part of the Tobago East constituency for elections to the Parliament of Trinidad and Tobago.

== See also ==
- List of cities and towns in Trinidad and Tobago
