= Cornelius Caroon =

Governor of New Courland, Tobago (fl. 17th century)

Governor of New Courland
- In office 1643–1650
- Preceded by: Edward Marshall (governor)
- Succeeded by: Adrian Lampsins

Cornelius Caroon was the Governor of New Courland, on Tobago from 1643 to 1650.

In 1642, Captain Caroon arrived on the north coast of Tobago with 300 Couronian colonists. This was not Courland's first attempt to colonize Tobago, but all previous efforts had been cut short by the Spanish.

In 1650, Caroon and the colonists abandoned New Courland and evacuated to Tortuga, and later Jamaica due to an outbreak of disease on Tobago that drastically reduced the number of men able to defend from the Caribs.

== See also ==
- Couronian colonization of the Americas
- History of Tobago
