= Charlotteville Cycling Club =

English cycling club

Charlotteville Cycling Club is a cycling club in Guildford, southern England. The club incorporated in 1903, saw a national record broken in 1934 by Harry Ferris and organises the Guildford Town Centre Races, which have taken place since 1984.

== History ==
The first cycling club in Guildford was in the early days of cycling in 1877, when the high bicycle (the penny-farthing) was in vogue. It began as Guildford Bicycle Club and changed name to Guildford Cycling Club. The club lasted 35 years, by which time the members were middle-aged, middle-class and due to the start of motor manufacturing, automobile enthusiasts.

=== New location and club ===
In the meantime, working men in much of Guildford wanted a club that would cater for them. Charlotteville an area on the north-eastern side of Guildford, was funded by a wealthy doctor, Thomas Sells. The estate, including small parks, was laid out by the Guildford architect Henry Peak, beginning in 1862, and named after Sells' wife, Charlotte. Charlotteville Cycling Club was formed at Charlotteville Institute in Addison Road on 27 March 1903. The mayor was the first president.

=== Rise of domestic racing ===
Charlotteville has been racing since its first club event, a 25-mile time trial, in 1905. However, racing in Guildford goes back further, to when Harold Crooke of Guildford CC won the first Anchor Shield in 1886 at races in Woodbridge Road. This trophy was provided by the landlady of the Anchor in Ripley, a venue for cyclists. The races were organised in conjunction with a Southern Counties Cyclists' camp in Shalford Park. Two years later, Crooke took the national high bicycle 100 miles record.

=== Progress in international racing ===
In the Charlotteville, Vic Jenner rode for Britain in the world championship road race in Italy in 1932. Then in 1938 and 1939, George Nightingale gained the 25 and 30-mile records and became the second person to beat the hour for 25 miles in Britain. Derek Cottington took the 25 and 50-mile straight-out records in 1970 and won the 25 and 50-mile championships in 1971.

Time trials for members had been run since 1905, but in 1928 the Charlotteville promoted its first open event, an evening track meeting, the first of an annual series. After the war in 1946, track promotion was renewed with the Whit Monday meetings at Woodbridge Road.

One of the Charlotteville's promotions was the World's Championship Trials at Brooklands Motor Racing Track in 1933. The motivation was Jenner's experiences in Italy. This was the birth of modern road racing.

== Current activities ==
The Club's membership comprises people of all ages and abilities who enjoy all aspects of cycling from time trials and road racing to the members of the club's Go-Ride club (called the Charlotteville Rascals) for under-16s. The Club now promotes several Open racing events through the season, the most important being the Guildford Town Centre Races.The club also promotes a series of club time trials which are held in the Normandy/Pirbright area, along with joining VCGH and Woking CC in an jnter-club time trial league.

The club holds a “Club Run” every Sunday morning, with other rides and events throughout the week, depending on the time of year. Sunday Club Runs depart from the Old Guildfordians Clubhouse in Stoke Park at 08:30 in the Summer months, and 09:00 in the Winter.

== Guildford Town Centre Races ==
The Guildford Town Centre Races were first promoted by Charlotteville Cycling Club in 1984 as part of Guildford Festival which it remains. The route was much the same as it is today, a small circuit of North Street, Market Street and a climb of the cobbled High Street. The first race was attended by 2000 spectators. Southern Veteran-Cycle Club Ripley Section rode two laps on veteran machines. The oldest was a French Michaux velocipede of about 1868. There were also two high “Ordinaries” of about 1880 and a Singer solid-tyred safety of 1890.

The Town Centre Races were the idea of Les Smith, Mike Willimott and Stuart Campbell who promoted them for the first ten years. Since 1984 the races have been cancelled in 1995, 1999 and 2000 due to roadworks or builders’ scaffolding on the road, and during the Covid-19 pandemic.

In 2024 the event became part of the British Cycling National Circuit Series, which required a slightly longer course, and so the course was extended to include the Upper High St.

Details of the event can be found at https://tcr.charlotteville.cc

== Colours ==
Club colours are red, green and white.
The club jersey design has changed many times and the design shown here is for 2011 and was based on an initial design by Roger Morgan that was produced as part of the previous design iteration process.

== See also ==
- Sid Ferris - Harry Ferris was a successful competitor in pre-war events organised by Charlotteville C.C.
