= Lampsins =

- noble family
- Country: Netherlands
- Founded: 16th century
- Titles: France: Baron of Tobago († 1673), Netherlands: Baron Lampsins († 1834), Baron Lampsins van den Velden († 1953)
- Dissolution: 1953

The Lampsins were an aristocratic family in the Netherlands, who attained notability in the trading and colonial worlds in the 17th century. The most notable members of the family were brothers Adrian and Cornelius Lampsins, who were granted letters of patent by Louis XIV and became the Barons of colonial Tobago in 1662.

The Lampsins family owned a trading house in Vlissingen, and Cornelius owned a fleet of over three hundred trading ships, in both the East and West Indies.

The Lampsins merchant house was the first employer of the famed admiral Michiel de Ruyter.

== Famous scions ==
- Adrian Lampsins (1598–1673), Baron of Tobago
- Cornelius Lampsins (1600–1664), Baron of Tobago, Governor of the Dutch West India Company
- Apollonius Lampsins (1674–1728), Governor of the Dutch East India Company, mayor of Middelburg
- Jan Cornelis Lampsins (1754–1834), Governor of the Dutch West India Company
Lampsins
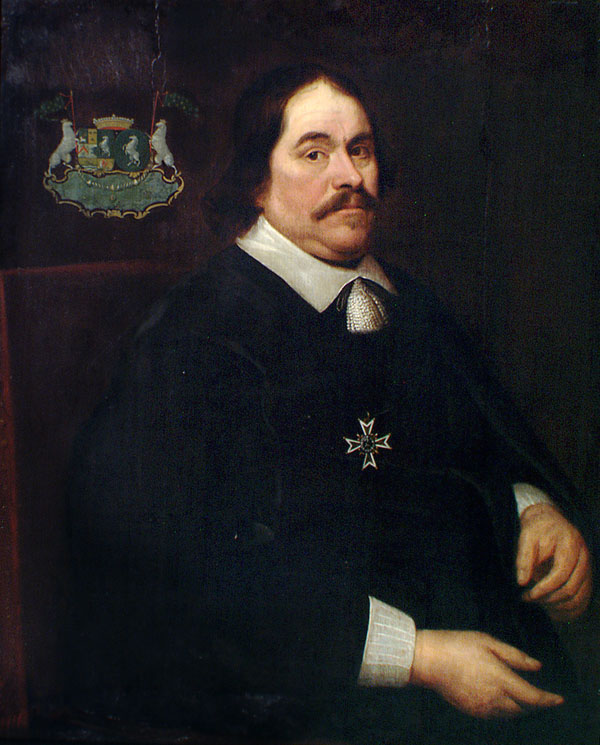
Cornelius Lampsins, Baron of Tobago

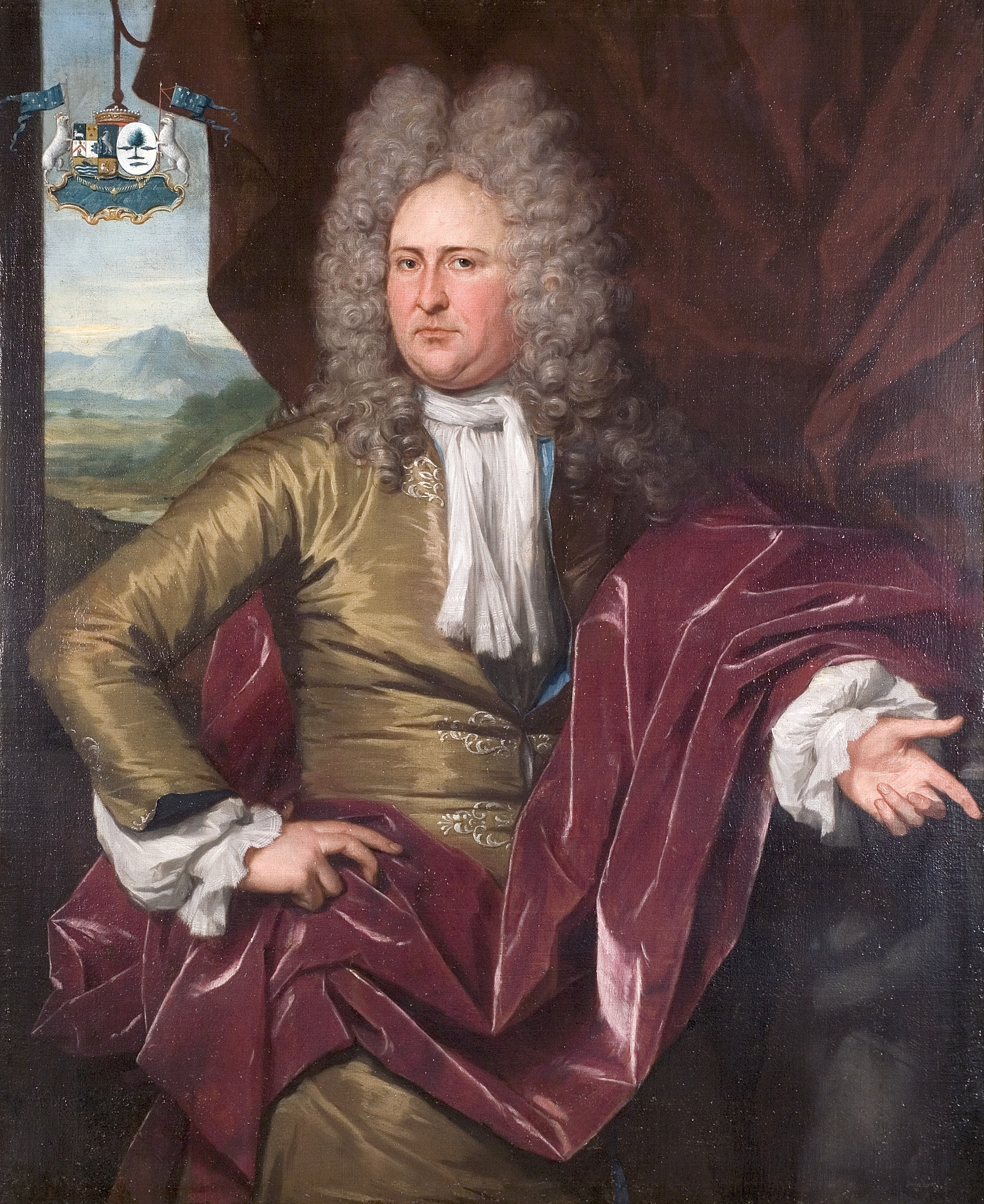
Apollonius Lampsins, Mayor of Middelburg

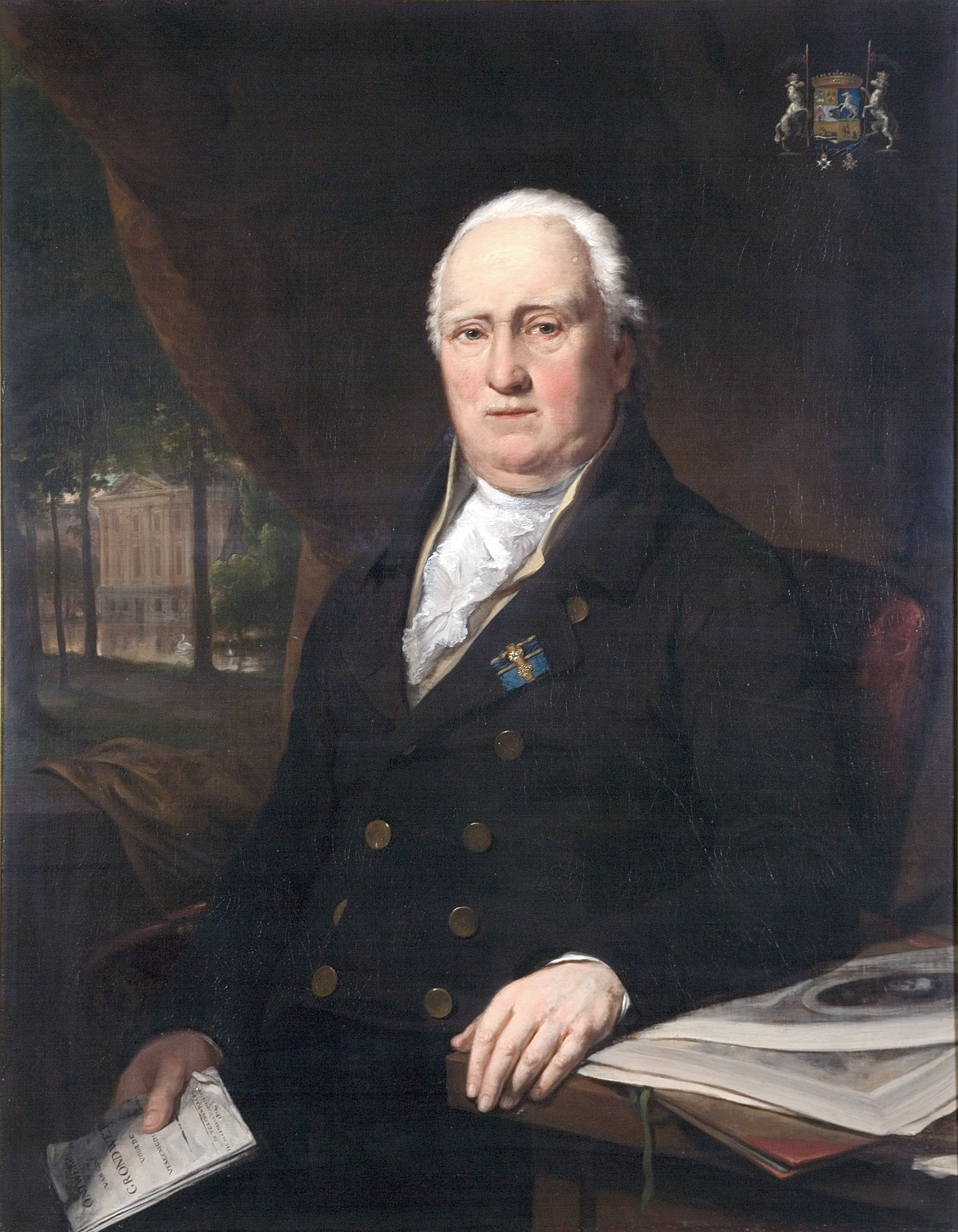
Jan Cornelis Lampsins, Governor of the Dutch West India Company

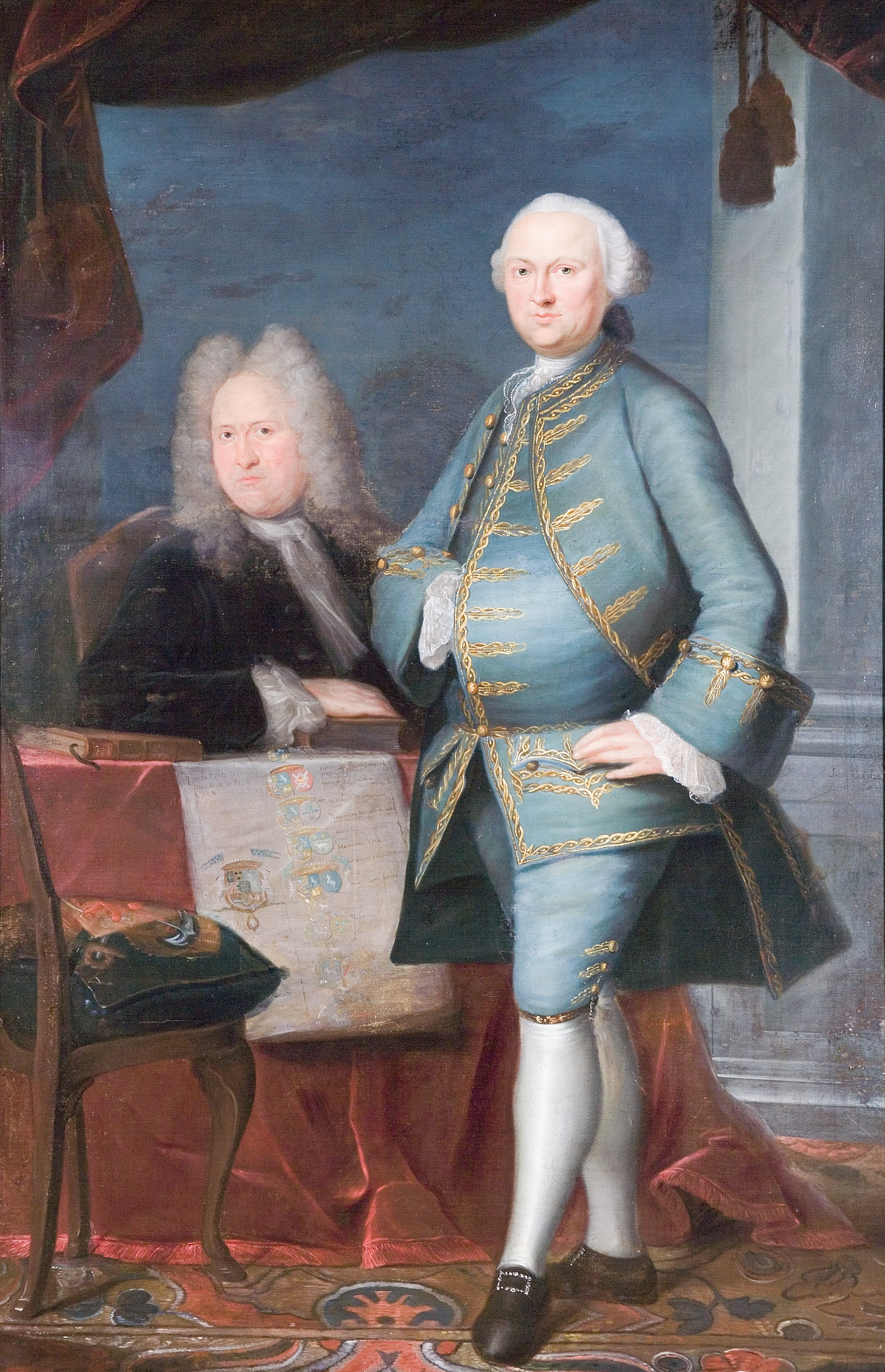
Jan Lampsins
