= Charlotteville =

Village on Tobago

Coordinates: 11°19′N 60°33′W

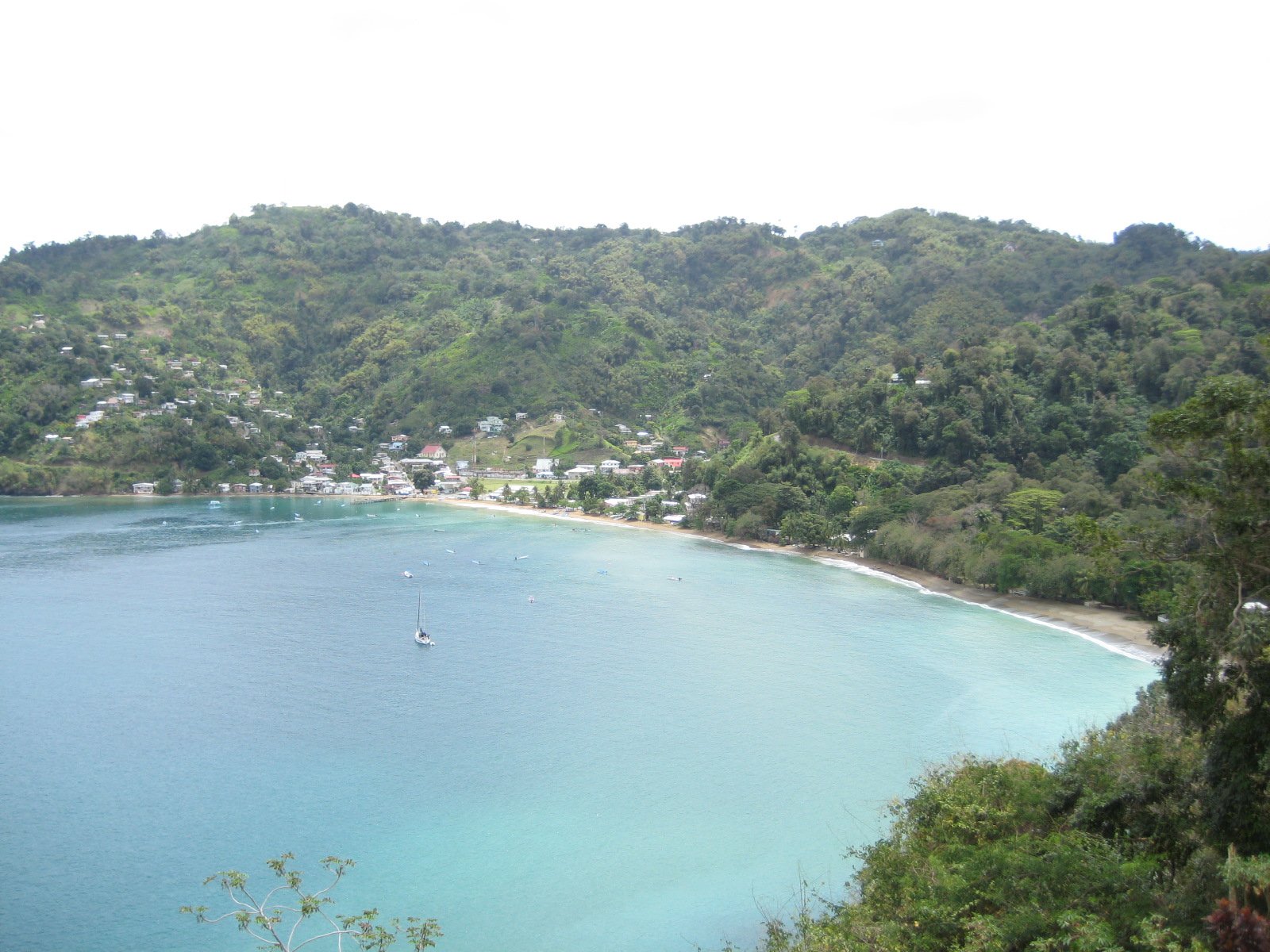
Charlotteville seen from Fort Cambelton

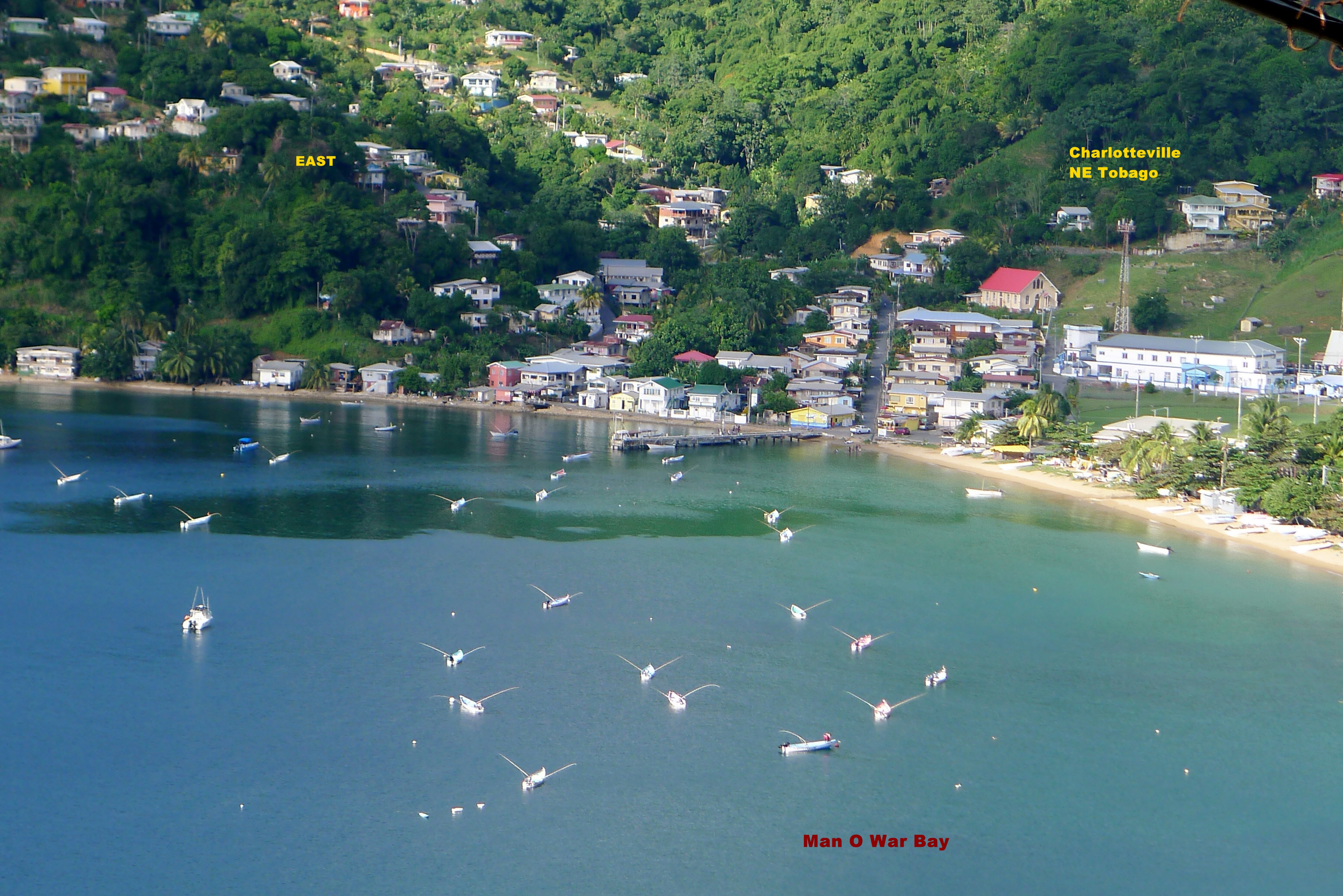
Charlotteville is located on the northern tip of the island of Tobago.

Charlotteville is a village lying on the northeastern tip of Tobago on Man-o-War Bay. It is bordered on all sides by the localities of Campbleton-Charlotteville and Top Hill.

== History ==
The first European settlement on Man-o-War Bay was part of the colony of Nieuw Walcheren established by Jan de Moor, the burgomaster of Vlissingen in the Netherlands. The first settlement, established in 1633, was abandoned, but the settlement was reestablished by fresh settlers from the Netherlands in 1639. New Walcheren was destroyed by the Spanish from Trinidad in 1636, and most of the colonists were executed.

After various failed attempts at European colonisation, Tobago was designated a neutral island in the 1748 Treaty of Aix-la-Chappelle. The Treaty of Paris in 1763 ended Tobago's status as a neutral territory and brought it under British control, and a plantation economy was established on the island. By the middle of the 19th century, the area now occupied by Charlotteville was dominated by two sugar estates, the Pirates' Bay Estate and the Charlotteville Estate which together consisted of approximately 11,000 acres (4,500 ha). These estates, which were purchased by the Turpin family in 1853, constitute Charlotteville.

== Geography ==
The history of the village is closely linked to sugar farming, and Charlotteville's harbour was also of importance for the town's development. In more recent times fishing has been important for Charlotteville's economy.

Charlotteville has one of the few remaining tamboo bamboo bands in which rhythms are produced by banging bamboo on the ground. This originated in slavery times when slaves were not allowed to play musical instruments. Today a saxophone player is in the band.

There are a few small restaurants. There are no large hotels; there are only a few small guesthouses and apartments to rent. There is a beach in the village and Pirate's Bay is twenty minutes' walk along a track.

Hidden at the other side of the village is Pirates Bay, also known as "Little Italy" for its popularity in playing football.

== Notable people ==
- Jearlean John, politician raised in Charlotteville.
