= Adrian Lampsins =

Colonial African Baron (1598–1673)

Adrian Lampsins Adriaan van Lampsin
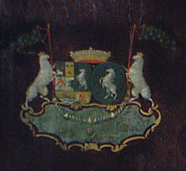

Baron of Tobago
- Reign: 1662 - 1666, 1673
- Predecessor: none
- Successor: none
- Co-Baron: Cornelius Lampsins (until 1664)

Governor of New Courland
- Reign: 1654 - 1656
- Predecessor: Cornelius Caroon
- Successor: Hubert de Beveren
- Born: 1598; Vlissingen, Dutch Republic
- Died: 1673 (aged 74–75); Tobago
- Spouse: Camilla Canossa

Adrian Lampsins, sometimes called Adrien Lampsius, (1598-1673) was the Baron of colonial Tobago, alongside his brother, Cornelius Lampsins.

Born to a wealthy merchant family in Vlissingen, in 1654 Adrian and Cornelius led a group of 50 colonists on the opposite side of Tobago of what was then New Courland, and named their settlement New Walcheren. A dispute arose between the Dutch and Couronian colonists, but the Dutch government arbitrated and declared Courland as the legitimate claimant to Tobago. In 1659, however, Courland was seized by Sweden, and the colony was now in the hands of the Dutch.

In 1662, the brothers Lampsins collaborated with King Louis XIV of France, and were given the title of the "Barons of Tobago," a title they held until the loss of Tobago to the English in 1666. Approximately 1,500 settlers lived under the rule of the Lampsins brothers.

In 1673, Adrian and the late Cornelius' son Jan briefly again retook Tobago, but the island was recaptured by an English force under Sir Tobias Bridge, and Adrian was killed alongside his nephew when the fort was blown up.

== See also ==
- Cornelius Lampsins
- Lampsins family
