= Campbleton-Charlotteville =

- Locality
- Interactive map of Campbleton-Charlotteville
- Coordinates: 11°19′5.88″N 60°34′30.36″W
- Country: Trinidad and Tobago
- Island: Tobago

Population (2011)
  - Total: 188

Campbleton-Charlotteville is a rural locality in Trinidad and Tobago, which is part of the parish of St. Paul, Tobago.

== Geography ==
The locality covers part of the island of Tobago and is bordered to the north by the Caribbean Sea, to the south by Roxborough and Delaford (both localities belonging to the parish of St. Paul), to the east by Speyside, Top Hill and Charlotteville and to the west by L'Anse Fourmi and Bloody Bay.

== Demography ==
Demographic data for Campbleton-Charlotteville:

demographic vertical bar chart of Campbleton-Charlotteville between 2000 and 2011

== Politics ==
Campbleton-Charlotteville is part of the Tobago East constituency for elections to the Parliament of Trinidad and Tobago.

== See also ==
- List of cities and towns in Trinidad and Tobago
