= Cornelius Lampsins =

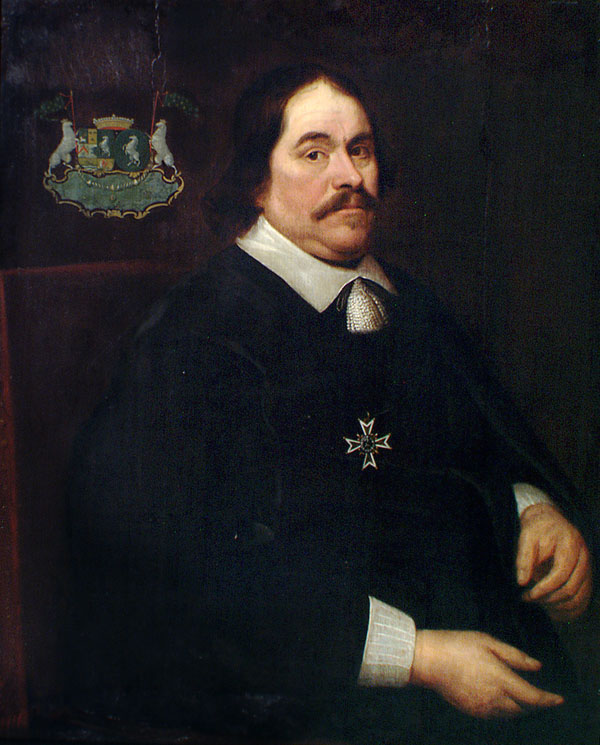
- Cornelis Lampsins, c. 1655

Baron of Tobago
- Reign: 1662–1664
- Predecessor: none
- Successor: Adrian Lampsins (as sole baron)
- Co-Baron: Adrian Lampsins
- Governor: Hubert de Beveren
- Born: 17 September 1600; Vlissingen, Dutch Republic
- Died: 2 September 1664 (aged 63); Vlissingen, Dutch Republic
- Spouse: Tanneken Geleyns Boers
- Issue: Jan Lampsins

Cornelius Lampsins (or van Lampsin, also Corneille Lampsius), was, along with his brother Adrian, the Baron of Tobago from 1662 to 1664.

Cornelius Lampsins was born in 1600 to a very wealthy Dutch merchant family, and he was involved in the early colonization of the Caribbean, in the 1630s. He owned a fleet of over three hundred trading vessels, and helped found the colonies of Martinique and Saint Thomas.

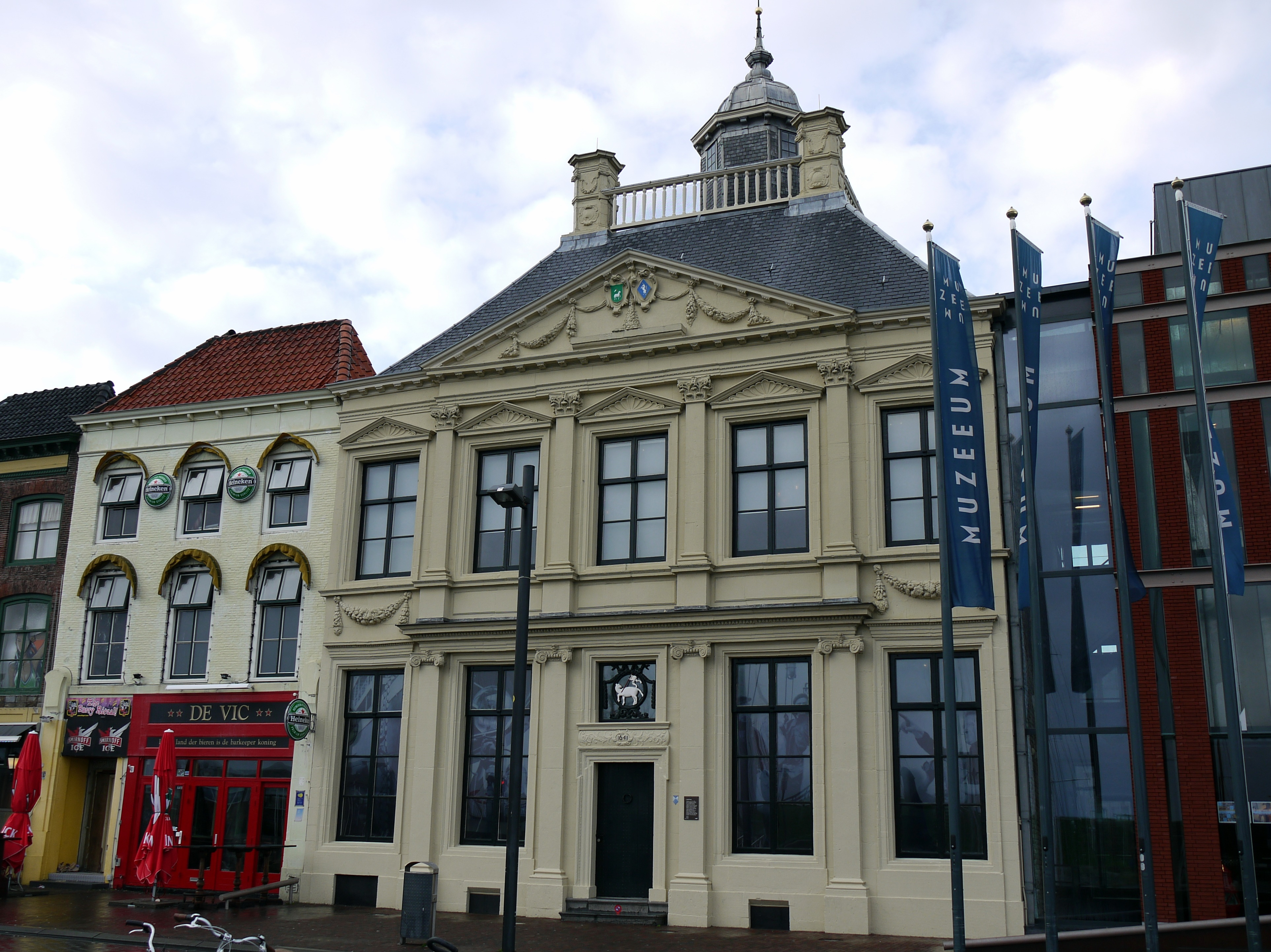
The Lampsins house in Vlissingen

In 1654, the Lampsins brothers led a Dutch colonial expedition to Tobago, which was then New Courland. There was much dispute between the Couronian and Dutch colonists, and when Courland surrendered to Sweden in 1659, the Lampsins brothers took control of the colony. In 1662, the brothers were elevated to Barons by the French King Louis XIV, and the Lampsins family reigned until the English invaded the island in 1666.

Cornelius Lampsins had two sons, Jan and Geleyn who participated in running the settlement on Tobago with their uncle. The descendants of the Lampsins brothers maintained many rights to the island until 1749.

== See also ==
- Adrian Lampsins
- Lampsins family
