= Curonian colonization of the Americas =

The Curonian colonization of the Americas was performed by the Duchy of Courland and Semigallia (present-day Latvia), which was the second-smallest state to colonize the Americas, after the Knights of Malta, as well as one of the two Eastern European states who did so, the other being Russia. It had a colony on the island of Tobago from 1654 to 1659 and intermittently from 1660 to 1689.

== History ==
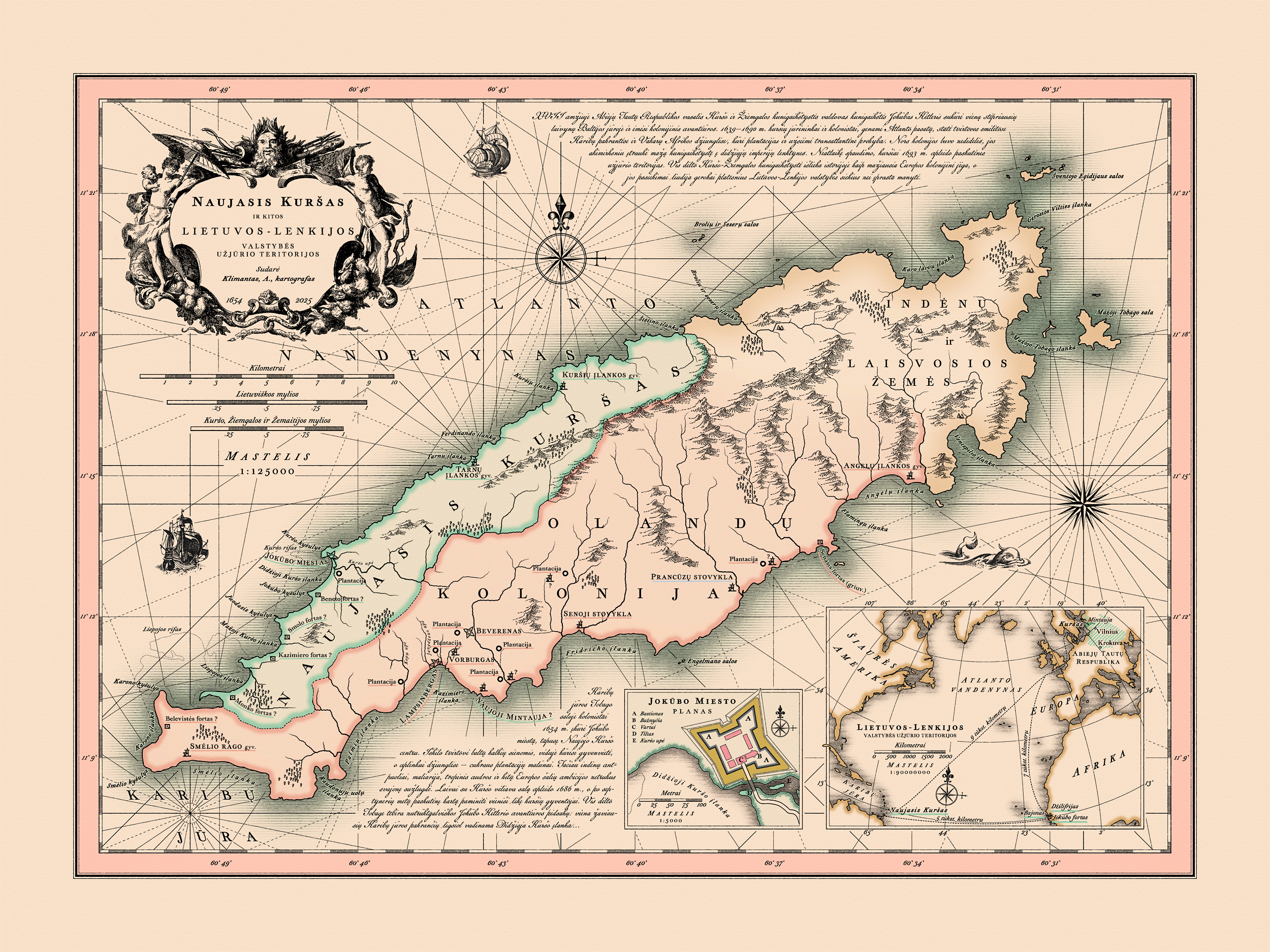
New Courland in Western Tobago

Courland and Semigallia was located in present-day Latvia, and had a population of only 200,000, mostly of Latvian and Baltic German ancestry, and was itself a vassal of the Polish–Lithuanian Commonwealth at that time. Under Duke Jacob Kettler (r. 1642–1682), a Baltic German, it established one of the largest merchant fleets in Europe, with its main harbours in Windau (modern Ventspils), and Libau (modern Liepāja). During his travels to Western Europe, Duke Jacob became an eager proponent of mercantilism. Metalworking and shipbuilding became much more developed. Trading relations were established not only with nearby countries, but also with England, France, the Netherlands, Portugal and others.

=== Courland and Tobago ===
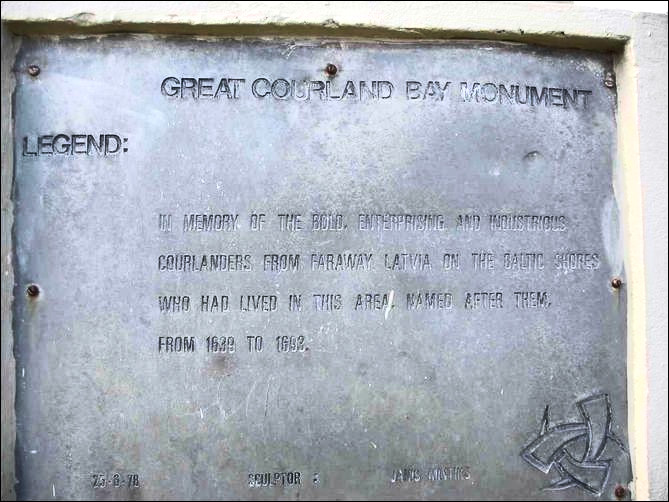
Great Courland Bay Monument.

The Duchy's ships started making trade voyages to the West Indies at least as early as 1637, when a Curonian ship attempted to found a colony on Tobago with 212 settlers. An earlier European settlement on the island, a Dutch colony named New Walcheren, formed in 1628, had been wiped out a few months earlier by Spain. The first Curonian colony met a similar end, whilst a second attempt was essentially blockaded by Spain and ended by 1639.

In 1642, two ships commanded by Captain Caroon with about 300 settlers attempted to settle on the north coast near Courland Bay. This colony was again blockaded, but proved more successful. Jesuit missionaries among the Carib quickly agitated and armed the tribes to attack the settlement. In 1650, the colonists abandoned the colony, which was evacuated to Tortuga and later Jamaica. By agreement with other Protestant powers who saw their various individual efforts insufficient to trade and/or colonize the Americas, Africa, and the Indies simultaneously, Courland's attention shifted to Africa. In 1651, the Duchy gained its first successful colony in Africa, on St. Andrews Island in the Gambia River and it established Fort Jacob there.

Soon afterwards the Protestant powers felt sufficiently organized and prepared to launch several colonial expeditions against Spanish interests in the Caribbean. The alliance between England and the Netherlands against Spain began to dissolve thanks to England's attempts to end Dutch monopolies. The Dutch were primary competitors to Courland, which decided to support the English in the brewing conflict. Therefore, Courland received permission from its Protestant English allies to make still another attempt at a colony on Tobago.

On 20 May 1654, the ship Das Wappen der Herzogin von Kurland ("The Arms of the Duchess of Courland") arrived carrying 45 cannon, 25 officers, 124 Curonian soldiers and 80 families of colonists to occupy Tobago. Captain Willem Mollens declared the island "New Courland" (Neu-Kurland). A fort was erected on the southwest of the island, also named Fort Jacobus (Fort James) with the surrounding town called Jacobsstadt (Jamestown). Other features were given Curonian names such as Great Courland Bay, Jacobs (James) Bay, Courland Estate, Neu-Mitau, Libau Bay and Little Courland Bay.

During their first year on the island the Curonians built an Evangelical Lutheran church. The colony was successful, but the Netherlands was not willing to accede to losing the West Indies and replied by establishing its own colony nearby a few months later. Thus, the small Curonian colony soon became overshadowed by a second Dutch colony. While 120 Curonian colonists had come in 1657, the Dutch colony reached a population of 1,200 by the next year, when 500 French Protestant refugees fleeing Catholic persecution joined them.

Goods exported to Europe included sugar, tobacco, coffee, cotton, ginger, indigo, rum, cocoa, tortoise shells, tropical birds and their feathers.

The Duchy of Courland and Semigallia became a focus of strategic interest for both Sweden and Poland–Lithuania. In 1655, the Swedish army entered the territory of the Duchy and the Northern Wars (1655–1660) began. The Swedish army held Duke Jacob captive from 1658 to 1660. During this period both colonies continued to thrive until they were taken by the more numerous Dutch settlers, who surrounded Fort James and forced Hubert de Beveren, Governor of the Curonians, to surrender. The merchant fleet and factories were destroyed. Courland and Semigallia officially yielded New Courland on 11 December 1659. However, this war ended with the Treaty of Oliwa (signed near Gdańsk) of 1660, on the basis of which Tobago was returned to Courland.

Although peace had been established between the Curonians and the Dutch, there still remained Spain. After several attacks by buccaneers seeking new harbours, and an expeditionary fleet of Spanish vessels, the Curonians left Tobago in 1666. In 1668, a Curonian ship attempted to reoccupy Fort Jacobus and was driven off by the Dutch.

Tobago was regained again just for a brief period at the end of Duke Jacob's rule with an attempt in July 1680 at a new colony which also later failed. He began to restore the fleet and factories, and the Duchy never again reached its previous level of prosperity. The island was abandoned except for visiting buccaneers from March 1683 to June 1686, before again being occupied by a collection of scattered Curonians from throughout the Dutch, French, and English West Indies, as well as by fresh settlers from the home country.

In May 1690, soon after the island was sold by Courland and Semigallia the previous year, the Curonian government permanently left Tobago, and those who remained essentially joined the buccaneers or other Anglo-Dutch colonies. Absentee governors would continue to be appointed until 1795, thereby facilitating the continued use of covert privateering Letters of Marque and Reprisal in the region.

The Courland Monument near Courland Bay commemorates the Duchy's settlements.

== Governors of New Courland ==
New Courland (Neu Kurland)
No.	Portrait	Incumbent Governor	Tenure		Duke of Courland and Semigallia	Monarch of the Polish–Lithuanian Commonwealth
No.	Portrait	Incumbent Governor	From	Until	Duke of Courland and Semigallia	Monarch of the Polish–Lithuanian Commonwealth
1		Edward Marshall	1642	1643	Friedrich Kettler; Frīdrihs Ketlers; House of Ketteler (17 May 1587 – 17 August 1642)	Ladislaus IV; Władysław IV Waza; Vladislovas Vaza; House of Vasa (8 November 1632 – 20 May 1648)
2		Cornelius Caroon	1643	1650	Jacob Kettler; Jakob von Kettler; House of Ketteler (17 August 1642 – 1 January 1682)	Ladislaus IV; Władysław IV Waza; Vladislovas Vaza; House of Vasa (8 November 1632 – 20 May 1648)
2		Cornelius Caroon	1643	1650	Jacob Kettler; Jakob von Kettler; House of Ketteler (17 August 1642 – 1 January 1682)	John II Casimir; Jan II Kazimierz; Jonas Kazimieras Vaza; House of Vasa (20 November 1648 – 16 September 1668)
3		Willem Mollens Curounian Governor	1654	1656	Jacob Kettler; Jakob von Kettler; House of Ketteler (17 August 1642 – 1 January 1682)	John II Casimir; Jan II Kazimierz; Jonas Kazimieras Vaza; House of Vasa (20 November 1648 – 16 September 1668)
3		Adrian Lampsins Dutch Governor	1654	1656	Jacob Kettler; Jakob von Kettler; House of Ketteler (17 August 1642 – 1 January 1682)	John II Casimir; Jan II Kazimierz; Jonas Kazimieras Vaza; House of Vasa (20 November 1648 – 16 September 1668)
3		Cornelius Lampsins Dutch Governor	1654	1656	Jacob Kettler; Jakob von Kettler; House of Ketteler (17 August 1642 – 1 January 1682)	John II Casimir; Jan II Kazimierz; Jonas Kazimieras Vaza; House of Vasa (20 November 1648 – 16 September 1668)
4		Hubert de Beveren	1656	1659	Jacob Kettler; Jakob von Kettler; House of Ketteler (17 August 1642 – 1 January 1682)	John II Casimir; Jan II Kazimierz; Jonas Kazimieras Vaza; House of Vasa (20 November 1648 – 16 September 1668)
Dutch Settlers Take Control (1659–1660) after Jacob Kettler is captured by the Swedish Empire in the Second Northern War by 1658–1660
5		Adrian Lampsins; Baron of Tobago; De Facto	1662	1666	Jacob Kettler; Jakob von Kettler; House of Ketteler (17 August 1642 – 1 January 1682)	John II Casimir; Jan II Kazimierz; Jonas Kazimieras Vaza; House of Vasa (20 November 1648 – 16 September 1668)
5		Cornelius Lampsins; Baron of Tobago; De Facto	1662	1666	Jacob Kettler; Jakob von Kettler; House of Ketteler (17 August 1642 – 1 January 1682)	John II Casimir; Jan II Kazimierz; Jonas Kazimieras Vaza; House of Vasa (20 November 1648 – 16 September 1668)
5		unknown	1660	1689	Frederick Casimir Kettler; Friedrich Casimir Kettler; House of Ketteler (1 January 1682 – 22 January 1698)	Michael I Michał Korybut Wiśniowiecki; Mykolas Kaributas Višnioveckis; House of Wiśniowiecki (19 June 1669 – 10 November 1673)
5		unknown	1660	1689	Frederick Casimir Kettler; Friedrich Casimir Kettler; House of Ketteler (1 January 1682 – 22 January 1698)	John III; Jan III Sobieski; Jonas III Sobieskis; House of Sobieski (21 May 1674 – 17 June 1696)

Jamaican buccaneers and English forces from Barbados invade by 1666 during the Second Anglo-Dutch War.

French forces from Grenada then capture the island.

The Dutch recapture the island by 1667 and Dutch settlers re-establish the colony by 1668.

The Nepoyo (Arawakans) from Trinidad attack the settlement, but they were able to fend off the attacks with the help of the native Kalina (Carib) of Tobago, but were attacked again by the Kalinago (Island Caribs) from St. Vincent.

At the outbreak of the Third Anglo-Dutch War (1672–1674), the colony was captured and looted again by Barbadians, where in 1673 Adrian Lampsins and the late Cornelius' son Jan briefly again retook Tobago, but the island was recaptured by an English Barbadian force under Sir Tobias Bridge from Barbados, and Adrian was killed alongside his nephew when the fort was blown up.

A new Dutch colony was re-established in 1676.

The French attack again by March 1677, with the resulting naval battle resulted in serious losses on both sides, and the French forces withdrew, but returned the following year, captured the island, and destroyed the settlement.

Fresh Courlander attempts to establish a colony in Tobago in 1680 and 1681 were abandoned in 1683.

New Courland was abandoned from 1683 to 1686.

A final Courlander attempt to settle the island in 1686 was largely abandoned by 1687.

New Courland is finally sold to England between 1690 and 1693, and the last mention of the colony was a small group of settlers encountered by a Danish ship in 1693.

== See also ==
- Curonian colonization
- Colonization attempts by Poland
