= John Waller (Virginia politician) =

American politician (1673–1754)

Member of the House of Burgesses

Captain
- In office 1720–1722 Serving with Thomas Johnson
- Preceded by: Orlando Jones
- Succeeded by: William Aylett
- Constituency: King William County
- In office 1710–1714 Serving with Henry Fox, Orlando Jones
- Preceded by: John West
- Succeeded by: Orlando Jones

Personal details
- Born: January 23, 1673 Colony of Virginia
- Died: August 2, 1754 (aged 81) Spotsylvania County, Colony of Virginia
- Spouse: Dorothy King Waller
- Children: Mary, Edmund, William, John, Thomas and Benjamin
- Profession: Planter, officer, politician

John Waller (January 23, 1673 – August 2, 1754) was a planter, military officer and politician in the Colony of Virginia who was the effective progenitor of one of the First Families of Virginia, and who represented King William County in the House of Burgesses, and helped secure creation of Spotsylvania County, then served as its first clerk for two decades. Complicating matters, the name was common in the family and not only did this man serve as Spotsylvania's clerk, so did his sons Edmund and William and two grandsons named John (sons of different sons), so that family members served as Spotsylvania's clerk for 64 years. Moreover, two descendants named John Waller also would serve in the Virginia House of Delegates: one from Bourbon County before creation of the state of Kentucky, and the other represented York County in the assembly of 1800 while his cousin Benjamin C. Waller represented Williamsburg, which had become the colony's capital city during this man's lifetime, and was split between York and James City Counties, but during the American Revolutionary War, Richmond had become the capital of the new Commonwealth of Virginia.

== Early and family life ==
Coat of Arms of John Waller

Waller was the fifth child (and third son) born to Dr. John Waller of Newport Pagnell. His father had married Mary Key and either visited or emigrated to the Virginia Colony in 1635. However, she died and Dr. Waller remarried, to Mary Pomfrett on January 13, 1669, who gave birth to this boy four years later. Baptized at Newport Pagnell on January 23, 1673. A cousin of the English Civil War parliamentarians William and Hardress Waller, Waller had a brother called William who became a Church of England clergyman and another brother, Edmund, who was a fellow of St John's College, Cambridge.

== Career ==
Whether this John Waller was born in the Virginia Colony or England, shortly after reaching legal age, he bought 1039 acres of land in the Pamunkey Neck of then vast New Kent County, on the south side of the Mattaponi River on May 1, 1696. He established a plantation which he named "Endfield", which he operated at least in part using enslaved labor and which still exists today as Enfield Sod, Inc. Virginia's legislature would establish King and Queen County from New Kent County in 1701, and King William County was split from King and Queen County in 1702. Around 1705, he operated a ferry across the Mattaponi River that had previously been operated by the Graves family of York County, and then a man named John Willis, and would later by operated by the Dudley family (hence references before 1700 to Graves' ferry and during the Revolutionary War to Dudley's Ferry. Waller had a house named Brookshire in King and Queen County at that Landing. Two decades passed before further development warranted creation of Spotsylvania County from the western part of King William County, where this man also invested in land. Between 1723 and 1726, Waller established another plantation in Spotsylvania County, which he named "Newport" for his birthplace in England.

Waller was considered a "gentleman" and in 1710 King William voters elected him and Henry Fox as their representatives in the House of Burgesses (a part time position). He was re-elected in 1712, but Henry Fox died before the legislature's second session and was succeeded by Orlando Jones, and Waller did not win re-election in 1715, but was instead succeeded by Thomas Johnson. He again won election in the 1720-1722 session, in which legislators authorized creation of Spotsylvania County, but represented neither county in the Assembly of 1723-1726. His son William Waller would first represent Spotsylvania County in 1742, and would be the first of four men of that name to serve in Virginia's legislature.

This John Waller's militia service under Captain John West (whom he may have succeeded as burgess) earned him the title "Captain". He served at various times as sheriff in both King and Queen (1699–1701) and King William (1701–1702) counties of Virginia (on both sides of the Mattaponi River).

This John Waller was a justice of the peace and the first sheriff of King William County in 1701. A small building that still exists today at Endfield is said to have acted as the county's first jail. He was the first Clerk of the Spotsylvania County in 1722. His son Edmund succeeded him in 1742. In 1747 he (or his son John) was made a Trustee of the newly established town of Fredericksburg.

== Family ==
John Waller married Dorothy King circa 1697. They had six children: Mary, Edmund, John, Thomas, William, and Benjamin (the father of Judge Benjamin Waller). The eldest son Edmund Waller succeeded his father as Spotsylvania clerk in 1742, and was succeeded by his brother William in 1751 (the third clerk, until 1759), then their nephew John became clerk, and finally their brother John's son John became the county's fifth clerk (1774-1780). Mary Waller (1699–1781) married Zachary Lewis (1702–1765), and their daughter Ann Lewis married George Wythe, who signed the Declaration of Independence and taught Thomas Jefferson. His grandson Benjamin Waller married Martha Hall, and their daughter Dorothy Elizabeth Waller married Henry Tazewell in 1774. Their son Littleton Waller Tazewell (1774–1860) was a senator and Governor of Virginia.

== Death and legacy ==
As Waller is recorded as having died on August 2, 1754, there is no way to know if he was the John Waller who bought an African named Kunta Kinte after Kinte was kidnapped and transported to America about 1767. The story of Kunta Kinte is included in the 1976 book Roots: The Saga of an American Family by Alex Haley. Haley's book served, in part, as the premise for the groundbreaking 1977 miniseries Roots, as well as the History Channel remake in 2016.

One of the grandsons named John Waller (1741-1802) was a lawyer who became known as "Swearing Jack Waller" and the "Devil's Adjutant". However, upon hearing Rev. Lewis Craig preach while sitting on a grand jury investigating unlicensed preachers, that John Waller converted to the Baptist faith and became a noted Baptist preacher and was repeatedly jailed in various Virginia counties for his contempt of the authorities during his preaching. He died in Abbeville, South Carolina on July 4, 1802. His cousin Rev. Absalom Waller (1772-1823), son of Benjamin Waller (1749-1835) also became a noted Baptist preacher.
