= Chaz Guest =

American painter and sculptor (born 1961)

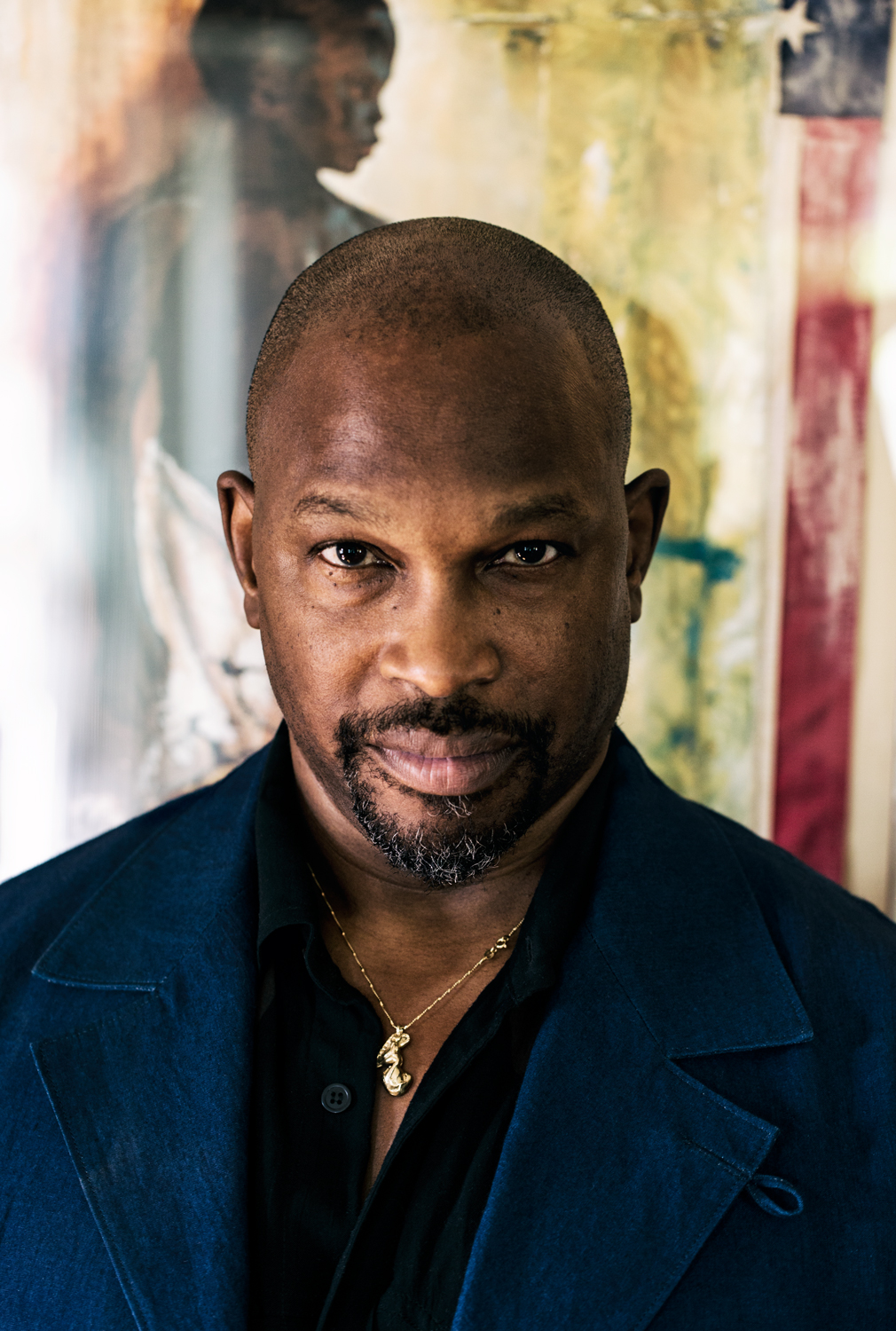
- Chaz Guest in his studio
- Born: May 2, 1961 (age 65); Niagara Falls, New York, United States
- Years active: 1985 – Present
- Children: Two sons
- Parent(s): Algirtha Guest; Rev. Theodore James Guest
- Website: www.chazguest.com

Chaz Guest (born May 2, 1961 in Niagara Falls, New York) is an American artist who works in the mediums of painting and sculpting. He is described by the Huffington Post as "an American artist of profound inventiveness."

== Life and career ==
Guest's parents are Algirtha Guest (born 1933) and Rev. Theodore James Guest (born 1922 - 2006). Guest's father - Rev. T. J. Guest, is a World War II Purple Heart recipient. Guest is the 7th of nine brothers and sisters. Guest graduated with a Bachelor of Science in Graphic Design from Southern Connecticut State University in 1985. Guest grew up in a quiet community in Niagara Falls, New York with his family. His parents divorced when he was ten years old. After the divorce, he moved with his mother and siblings to Philadelphia, Pennsylvania.

Guest has two sons, one born 1994 and one born 2003.

Guest received a Gymnastic scholarship to go to Southern Connecticut State University (S.C.S.U.) to study Kinesiology and pursue a degree in Graphic Arts. He subsequently competed successfully in the U.S. Olympic program. After graduating from S.C.S.U., Guest moved to New York City, where he enrolled in a fashion design curriculum at the Fashion Institute of Technology. It was during this period that he honed his formal skills in drawing. While at the Fashion Institute, Guest made the acquaintance of Antonio Lopez. Lopez inspired and influenced his decision to seek work as an illustrator. Guest studied at the Fashion Institute for nine months.

In 1986, Guest moved to Paris, France, to work as a freelance fashion illustrator. Guest joined Joyce Magazine as an illustrator for their magazine covers and was responsible for the illustrations of the JOYCE magazine covers for the 1987/1988 season. It was while working at Joyce Magazine that Guest met Christian Lacroix. Lacroix encouraged him to apply his illustrator skills to painting after Lacroix saw one of Guest's illustrations of couture designs done for Joyce Magazine. After the 1987/1988 season, Guest left Joyce magazine and moved to Dax, France, where he started painting.

After leaving the Fashion Institute of Technology, Guest began studying the paintings of Pablo Picasso and Salvador Dalí. Guest also studied the paintings of Balthus. In 1991, Guest sold his first painting to a passerby outside his Soho apartment.

Guest's first museum exhibit was a group show, "Decoding Identity: I Do it for My People" (January 23, 2009 – March 22, 2009) at the Museum of the African Diaspora in San Francisco (MOAD). His works are primarily made with Sumi ink.

== Notable works ==
In 2004, while at the home of Mattie and Michael Lawson in Hancock Park, Los Angeles, Guest was struck by the presence of Barack Obama, then running for Senate, while interacting with the guests. This image stuck with him, and he created a painting of The President based on that mental image. The President saw the painting of himself at a fundraiser at the home of Oprah Winfrey in 2008.

Guest's painting of Supreme Court Justice Thurgood Marshall hung in President Barack Obama's Oval Office at the White House. On October 11, 2005, then-Senator Obama sent a note to Guest thanking him for the painting. Guest has also authored a serigraph series of President Obama. Subsequently, Guest was invited by Kouji Matsuzaki San, Mayor of Obama, Fukui prefecture, to present the serigraphs.

On February 24, 2010, Chaz Guest presented the President of Gambia, Yahya Jammeh a portrait of the Gambian President. During his visit to the Gambia, Guest discussed with the Gambian leader the renaming of James Island and Juffereh in the North Bank Region. Guest proposed to the Gambian leader that the Island be renamed 'Kunta Kinte' Island. On February 6, 2011, James Island, the former British Slave Fort used for the slave trade of Africans in the River Gambia in the North Bank Region, was renamed by the Gambian President to Kunta Kinte Island. At the renaming ceremony of James Island in 2011, Guest revealed the miniature replica of his 30-foot statue of Kunta Kinte that will be displayed on Kunta Kinte Island.

Guest created two paintings to help the family of Trayvon Martin, an African-American teenager killed in an incident in Florida in 2012, to support Martin's younger brother. Guest donated the proceeds from selling the paintings to the Martin Family. Mr. Guest also did a painting of Troy Davis - a man sentenced to death for the murder of a Georgia police officer in 1991, for Amnesty International, USA.

Guest was named the Goodwill Ambassador to the Republic of Gambia, West Africa, in 2011 and the U.S. spokesperson for the 2014 International Roots Festival in Gambia.
