= Kunta Kinteh Island =

Island in the lower Gambia River

UNESCO World Heritage Site
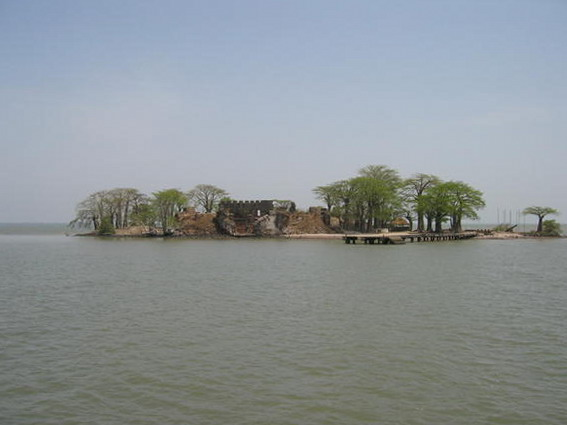
- Kunta Kinteh Island in 2004

- Location within The Gambia
- Official name: James Island
- Location: North Bank Division, The Gambia
- Part of: Kunta Kinteh Island and Related Sites
- Criteria: Cultural: (iii), (vi)
- Reference: 761rev-001
- Inscription: 2003 (27th Session)
- Area: 0.35 ha (38,000 sq ft)
- Coordinates: 13°19′03″N 16°21′41″W

Kunta Kinteh Island, formerly called James Island and St Andrew's Island, is an island in the Gambia River, 30 km (19 mi) from the river mouth and near Juffureh in the Republic of the Gambia. Fort James is located on the island. It is less than 3.2 km (2 miles) from Albreda on the river's northern bank. As an important historical site in the West African slave trade, it is listed as a UNESCO World Heritage Site, together with related sites including a ruined Portuguese chapel and a colonial warehouse in Albreda, the Maurel Frères Building in Juffureh, and Fort Bullen and Six-Gun Battery, which are located at the mouth of the Gambia River.

== History ==
The first record of European interaction with the island is in May 1456, when a Portuguese expedition led by Italian explorers Alvise Cadamosto and Antoniotto Usodimare moored off the island. They buried one of their sailors, named André, on the island, giving it its first European name—St Andrew's Island. Diogo Gomes also anchored off St Andrew's Island on his expedition in 1458. A Portuguese settlement, Santo Domingo, was built on the northern bank of Gambia River, opposite St Andrew's Island, in the 15th century.

The first European settlers on the island came from the Duchy of Courland and Semigallia, a vassal state of the Polish–Lithuanian Commonwealth, who also had other colonial possessions in the area, although the English Crown had granted the island to two separate companies in 1588 and 1618. In 1651, the settlers built a fort that they named Jacob Fort after Jacob Kettler, Duke of Courland, and used it as a trade base. Major Fock, a Courland soldier, was placed in charge of the first settlement and oversaw the construction of fortifications on St Andrew's Island, which were built following the recognised contemporary rules of military engineering. The main building was in the shape of a rectangle, and was flanked at each corner by a bastion, each of which was triangular. However, the fort had no water supply, and was forced to rely on the good will of the King of Barra in order to stay operational.

It was the intention of the Duke of Courland to establish a permanent settlement on St Andrew's Island, and so married couples were sent out to the island as well as a pastor. The first pastor was Gottschalk Eberling, who was replaced in 1655 by Joachim Dannefeld. The island had a small church built out of cane and with a thatched roof, from which Eberling and Dannefeld preached. There was a supposed deposit of gold at the river, so the Duke of Courland resolved to launch a full expedition to the Gambia. As few Courlanders had experience of Africa, he was forced to rely on foreigners. On 6 September 1652, he appointed the Dutchman Jacob du Moulin as his Director in the Gambia, while a Courlander, Frederick William Trotta von Treyden was appointed as his lieutenant.

Three ships, the Crocodile, the Patientia, and the Chur, were placed at Moulin's disposal. There were a number of issues with the expedition, and in December 1652, Treyden wrote to the Duke of Courland describing Moulin as a "light-hearted knave". After setting sail in March 1653, the expedition shortly after ran out of supplies and was forced to return. Moulin was subsequently arrested for his various misdeeds, including embezzling the Duke's money. A second expedition was attempted in 1654, under the command of a Danish explorer, Philip von Seitz. However, Seitz abandoned the expedition in Hamburg, managing to extract 15,000 rixdollars from the Duke.

After these two failed expeditions, the Duke turned to his own people. Captain Otto Stiel, a Courlander who had previously visited the Gambia, was appointed as its Governor and as Commandant of St Andrew's Island. In 1658, the Duke of Courland and his family were captured by a Swedish mercenary after becoming embroiled in the “Deluge”, the Swedish invasion of the Polish–Lithuanian Commonwealth, and communication between Courland and St Andrew's Island was cut off for around two years.

As a result of this, the Dutch West India Company made an agreement with the Duke's representative in Holland, Henry Momber, by which it would both resupply and take over St Andrew's Island. Momber agreed, in the absence of any instructions from the Duke. The Dutch sent a ship of soldiers to the island to seize it. Stiel objected, but on learning that the Dutch West India Company would guarantee them their pay, the garrison mutinied and returned to Holland on the ship that had brought out the new garrison.

In 1660, the Dutch lost control of the island after a French privateer in Swedish service had surprised the fort at night, expelled the garrison and plundered the island. The privateer subsequently met a merchant ship of the Groningen chamber of the Dutch West India Company, who, in a breakdown of communications, refused to buy back the island and said that it belonged to the Duke of Courland, rather than the Amsterdam chamber of the same company. Momber got in touch with Stiel, who had been living in Holland, and he traveled back to St Andrew's Island in a ship provided by the Groningen chamber.

Several weeks later, three ships of the Amsterdam chamber anchored off the island and demanded that Stiel surrender. He refused, and the Dutch effected a landing, bringing a large amount of firepower to bear on the fort. With only a handful of men, Stiel was forced to surrender. However, when the King of Barra saw Stiel evicted again, he decided to come to his aid by capturing a party of Dutchmen who had landed at Juffure for fresh water. The King demanded that Stiel be re-instated and was joined by a large number of other native kingdoms, including the King of Kombo. The Dutch relented after a four-week stand-off, and the commander of the fort left it without provisions and partially destroyed before turning it back over to Stiel and the Courlanders. Over the next eight months, the garrison was reduced to just seven Europeans.

The Dutch briefly held the fort from 1659 until the English captured it in 1661. The Dutch ceded the fort to the English in 1664.

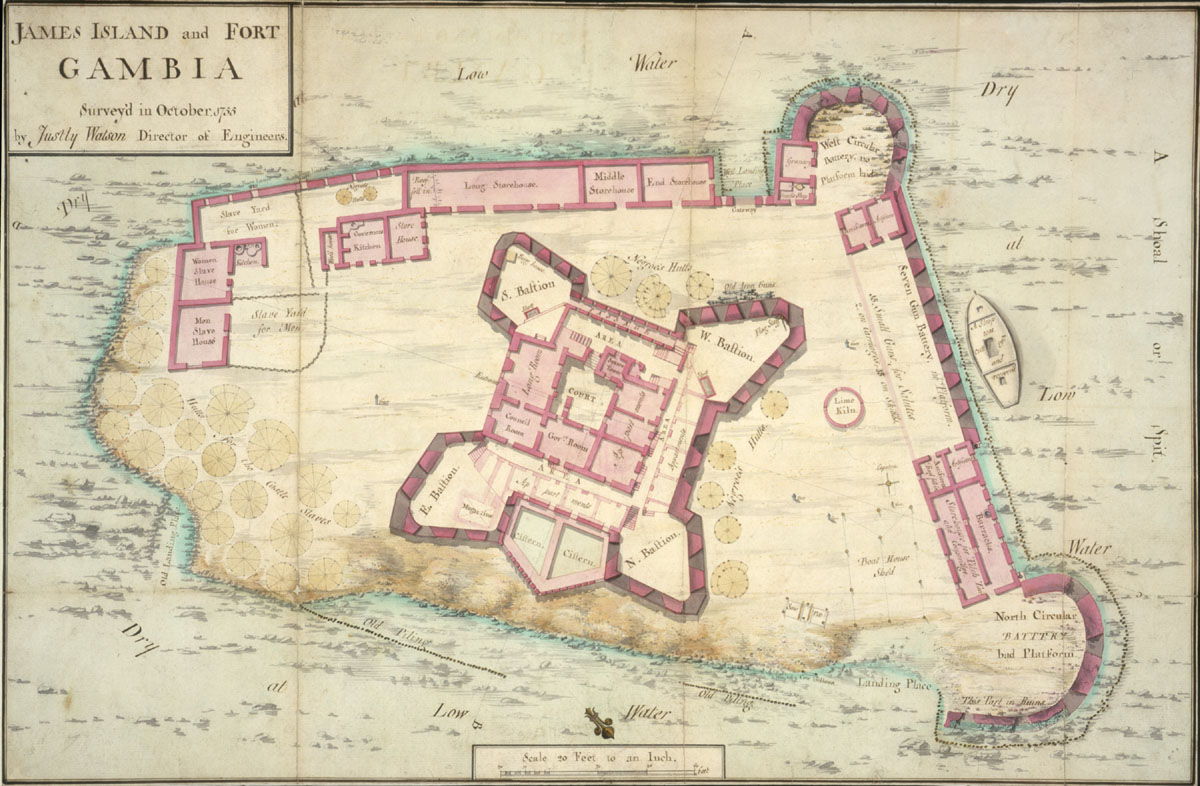
Map of Fort James and James Island from 1755

The English renamed the island James Island and the fort Fort James after James, the Duke of York, later King James II of England. The chartered Royal Adventurers in Africa Company administered the territory, which used it first for the gold and ivory trade, and later in the slave trade. On 1 August 1669, the company sublet the administration to the Gambia Adventurers. In 1684, the Royal African Company took over the Gambia's administration.

In 1695, the French captured Fort James after a battle with English sailors, but by 1702, Fort James was once again definitively under English control. It was destroyed and rebuilt several times in this period, both in conflicts between the English and French and by pirates. On 13 June 1750, the Company of Merchants Trading to Africa assumed the administration of the Gambia. Between 1758 and 1779, the Gambia was part of British Senegambia.

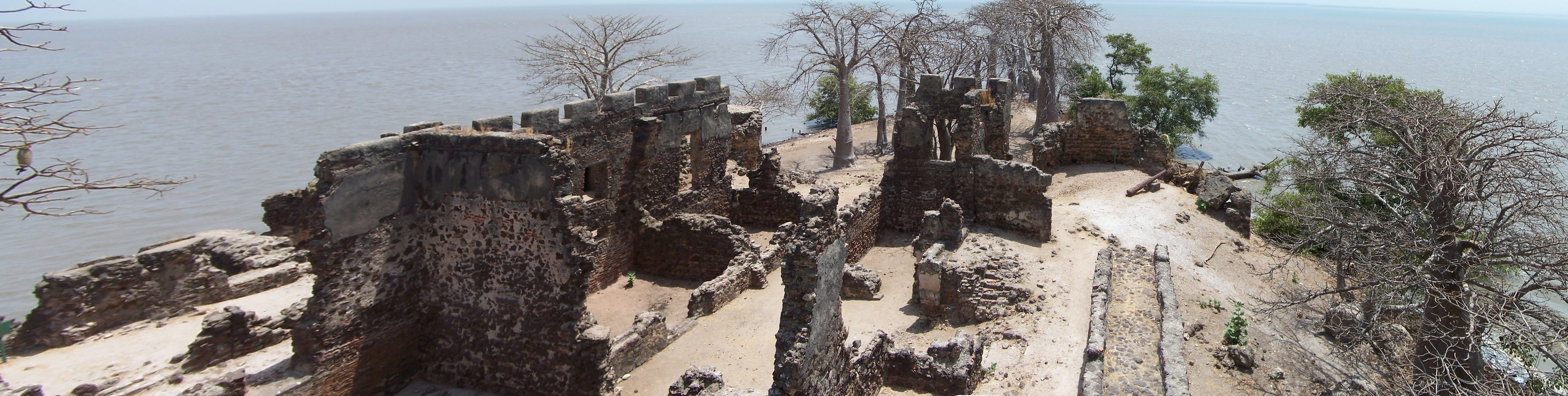
Ruins on the island

The Six-Gun Battery (1816) and Fort Bullen (1826), now included in the James Island UNESCO World Heritage Site and located on both sides of the mouth of the River Gambia, were built with the specific intent of thwarting the slave trade once it had become illegal in the British Empire after the passing of the Slave Trade Act in 1807. They are the only known defensive structures in the region built to stop slaving interests, as opposed to enforcing them. These sites along with the island itself were abandoned in 1870.

On 6 February 2011, at the request of New York artist Chaz Guest to Gambian President Yahya Jammeh, it was renamed to Kunta Kinteh Island to give the island a Gambian name. At the renaming ceremony, Guest revealed the miniature replica of his 9-m (30-foot) statue of Kunta Kinte that would be displayed on Kunta Kinte Island.

== Legacy ==
Kunta Kinteh Island is suffering heavy erosion and is now approximately 1/6 of the size it had been during the time when the fort was active. Ruins of several of the British administrative buildings (including a single cell, apparently used to house the most troublesome captives), a small jetty and a number of skeletal baobab trees remain. The ruins have been stabilised and protected by a capping. Because the island is low-lying, during high tide and storms sometimes waves will beat against some of the surviving structures.

Kunta Kinte, a character described in Alex Haley's book and TV series Roots, has become associated with James Island. The book states that Kunta Kinte was among 98 slaves that the slave ship Lord Ligonier brought to Annapolis, Maryland in 1767.
