= Benjamin Waller =

American judge (1716–1786)

The Honorable Benjamin Waller
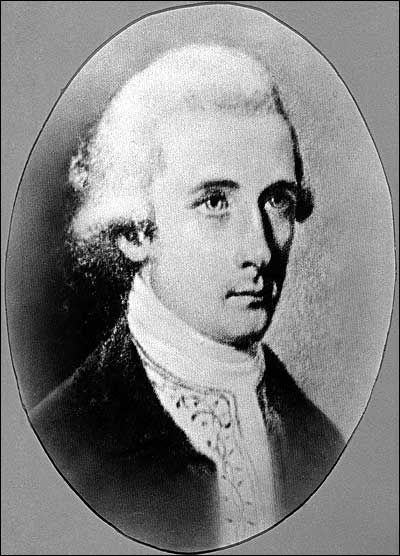

Judge of the General Court of Virginia
- In office 1779–1786

Member of the House of Burgesses
- In office 1744–1761
- Preceded by: Lewis Burwell
- Succeeded by: Philip Johnson
- Constituency: James City County

Personal details
- Born: October 1, 1716 Endfield plantation, King William County, Virginia, British America
- Died: May 1, 1786 (aged 69) Virginia, U.S.
- Spouse: Martha Hall
- Relations: Col. John Waller
- Children: 6
- Occupation: Planter, lawyer, politician, judge
- Profession: Law

Benjamin Waller (1 October 1716 – 1 May 1786) was an American planter, lawyer, politician, military officer and judge.

== Early life and education ==
Waller was born on October 1, 1716 at his father's Enfield plantation in King William County in what was then the Colony of Virginia. His mother was Dorothy King, and his father, Col. John Waller had emigrated from Britain, trained as a lawyer utilizing the legal library of Sir John Randolph and become a major landowner in the colony, as well as served in the House of Burgesses as would this youngest son. Thus he was descended from what would later be called the First Families of Virginia. His paternal ancestors had emigrated from Newport Pagnell, Buckinghamshire, England, the branch of a family long seated at Beaconsfield and previously at Groombridge Place, Kent, England. John Waller Esquire was one of the signatories to the Second Charter of Virginia in 1609. This man, Benjamin Waller, received a private education appropriate to his class.

== Career ==
By 1738, Benjamin Waller had been admitted to the Virginia bar, and began serving as King's Attorney (prosecutor) in Gloucester County. The following year (1739), Waller began serving as clerk of the James City County court, whose jurisdiction included part of Williamsburg, the colony's capital city. His father had become the first clerk of the King William County Court, and then the Spotsylvania County court in 1720 and his elder brothers and nephews would hold that Spotsylvania clerk position through the American Revolutionary War. Meanwhile Benjamin Waller served as clerk of the general court (which handled the most severe criminal cases, such as murder, as well as appeals of cases from the county courts) for a number of years. While Virginia was still a colony he also served as clerk of "The Court of Oyer and Terminer" (1739) and Clerk of the "Committees of Propositions and Grievances, and Privileges, and Elections" (1743).

James City County voters elected him to replace Lewis Burwell upon the latter's death in 1742, and continued to re-elect him so he served alongside Carter Burwell, then Joseph Morton, then Lewis Burwell Jr. His brother William Waller also served part time as a legislator, as had their father.

Despite his offices under King George III, Waller was a patriot as well as eminent lawyer, and his name is on the list of the Committee of Safety for the city of Williamsburg Dec. 1774 (Forces Archives.) As clerk of courts, it fell to Benjamin Waller to read the United States Declaration of Independence from the Williamsburg courthouse steps on July 25, 1776. In 1777, Waller was named presiding judge of the court of admiralty in Williamsburg, Virginia. He later served as a judge on the first Court of Appeals from 1779 until 1785 when the court moved to Richmond, Virginia. (WMQ July 1898).

He was an eminent lawyer of Colonial times and held many important offices under the crown.

Waller also served as mentor and teacher of law to George Wythe.

== Personal life ==
He married Martha Hall (1728-1780) in 1746 and they had 10 children. Martha "tended to the household overseeing the children and directing the work of their several slaves. One of his grandsons, William Waller, married the daughter of U.S. President John Tyler and lived in Benjamin Waller's house in Williamsburg".

== Death and legacy ==
Most descendants believe Waller died on May 1, 1786 in Williamsburg, although some sources list his death date as May 2, 1796 on an outlying plantation. Williamsburg's Waller Street is named for Benjamin Waller and his family. His grandson, Littleton Waller Tazewell, continued the family's planter and politician traditions, serving in the Virginia legislature and as Governor of Virginia, as well as in both houses of the U.S. Congress.

Author Alex Haley sketched out the family's English origins in his book Roots: The Saga of an American Family, since his kidnapped African ancestor had become property of a "John Waller", probably related to this man.

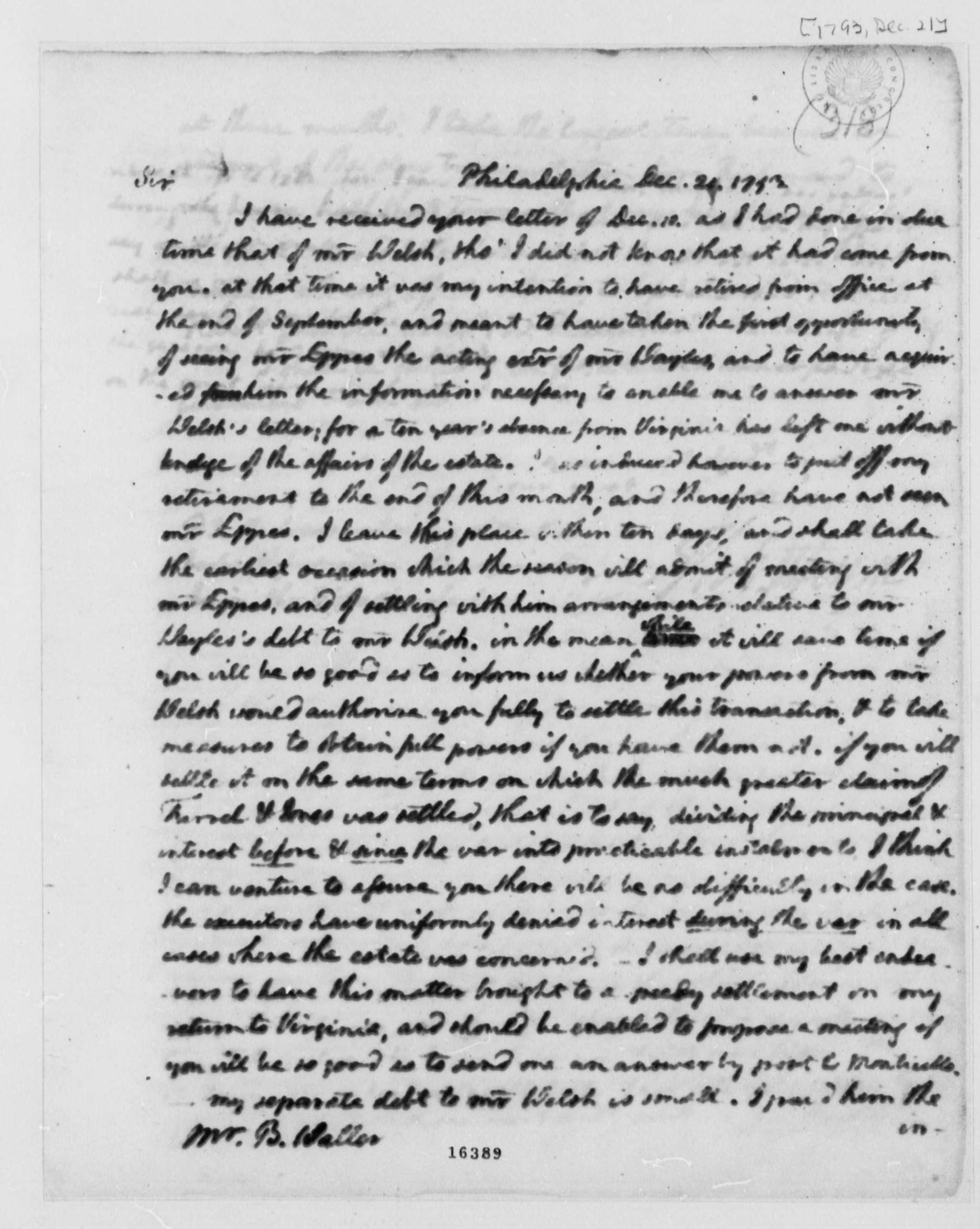
Letter from Thomas Jefferson to Benjamin Waller, 1793.

Coat of Arms of Benjamin Waller

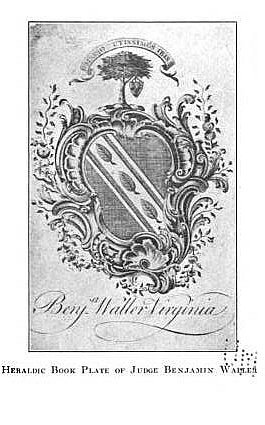
Armorial bookplate of Benjamin Waller
