= Roots: The Gift =

1988 television film

- VHS cover
- Genre: Historical drama
- Based on: Characters from Roots by Alex Haley
- Written by: D.M. Eyre Jr.
- Directed by: Kevin Hooks
- Starring: Louis Gossett Jr.; LeVar Burton; Avery Brooks; Kate Mulgrew; Shaun Cassidy; John McMartin; Jerry Hardin; Annabella Price; Fran Bennett; Tim Russ; Michael Learned
- Music by: Gerald Fried
- Country of origin: United States
- Original language: English

Production
- Executive producers: David L. Wolper; Bernard Sofronski
- Producer: Mark M. Wolper
- Cinematography: John A. Alonzo
- Editor: Stanford C. Allen
- Running time: 100 minutes
- Production companies: David L. Wolper Productions; Warner Bros. Television

Original release
- Network: ABC
- Release: December 11, 1988

Roots: The Gift is a 1988 American historical drama television film directed by Kevin Hooks and written by D.M. Eyre Jr. It is the third installment of the Roots miniseries. The film premiered on ABC on December 11, 1988, with AT&T as the sole national sponsor for the broadcast, and was crafted as a Christmas film. LeVar Burton and Louis Gossett Jr. reprise their respective roles of Kunta Kinte and Fiddler. The film takes place between the second and third episodes of the original Roots series. It was watched by 23.3 million viewers.

== Plot summary ==
In December 1775, Cletus Moyer is a free black Northerner in colonial America, working with a pre-Underground Railroad network to help slaves escape captivity. In the days just prior to Christmas, a group of bounty hunters led by Hattie Carraway captures Moyer near the Parker plantation in Spotsylvania County, Virginia. Because of his capture, dozens of slaves who have already left their plantations in escape attempts are in danger of being captured as well. Moyer implores two slaves from the nearby Reynolds plantation to take his place: Kunta Kinte, a Mandinka in his mid-twenties who was captured in what is now the Gambia, and Fiddler, an elderly man who was born into slavery. Kunta is eager to help (and to escape himself), but Fiddler is unwilling, fearful of the consequences if they are caught.

After an unsuccessful slave revolt elsewhere in the colony, Moyer and two slaves are hanged by Carraway's men on Christmas Eve, prompting Fiddler to set aside his fear and help Kunta lead the runaway slaves to freedom. Although the pair successfully leads the runaways that night to their next stop on the escape route (a boat waiting at the river) there is only room for one of them, and since neither one wants to go without the other, they both decide to stay. That choice forces them to return to the Parker plantation and manufacture an excuse for their temporary absence. Nevertheless, Kunta and Fiddler are left with the satisfaction of knowing that they helped to give a group of fellow slaves the best Christmas gift of all: freedom.

One stated meaning of the "gift" mentioned in the title is freedom. When Kunta visits Cletus in his cell to bring him food, the captured freedman offers him a word of wisdom in return: "I will give you a Christmas gift. 'Live free or die.'" Another interpretation is the chance for a new life, symbolized by the birth of a child on Christmas Eve. When Kunta and Fiddler arrive at the river crossing with the runaway slaves, a woman in their party goes into labor. After the baby girl is born, Kunta lifts the swaddled child up to the night sky and says "Behold the only thing greater than yourself." These words reference a scene in the 1977 miniseries, when an older Kunta, played by John Amos, tells his newborn daughter Kizzy the same thing against a starlit sky.

== Cast ==
- LeVar Burton as Kunta Kinte
- Louis Gossett Jr. as Fiddler
- Shaun Cassidy as Edmund Parker, Jr.
- Jerry Hardin as Dr. William Reynolds
- Kate Mulgrew as Hattie Carraway
- Avery Brooks as Cletus Moyer
- Michael Learned as Amelia
- John McMartin as Edmund Parker, Sr.
- Annabella Price as Sarah Parker
- Fran Bennett as May
- Tim Russ as Marcellus
- Introduction by Alex Haley

Roots: The Gift is notable as a Star Trek "preunion" for featuring four actors who portrayed major characters in Star Trek television shows: Burton (Geordi La Forge in Star Trek: The Next Generation), Brooks (Benjamin Sisko in Star Trek: Deep Space Nine), Mulgrew and Russ (Kathryn Janeway and Tuvok in Star Trek: Voyager). Jerry Hardin played three notable Star Trek guest roles: Radue in Star Trek: The Next Generation "When the Bough Breaks", Samuel Clemens in Star Trek: The Next Generation "Time's Arrow", and Neria in Star Trek: Voyager "Emanations".

== Production ==
Following a brief introduction by Alex Haley, the film opens with a replay of a memorable scene from the second episode of the original Roots miniseries: Following the first of many unsuccessful escape attempts, a prideful Kunta is publicly and mercilessly whipped until he agrees to assume the English name "Toby", which was selected for him by his new owner. Afterwards, Fiddler tends to the semi-conscious Kunta, telling him "You know who you be" and that it does not matter what anyone else calls him.

== Home media ==
In 2007, Warner Bros. released Roots: The Complete Collection, a 10-disc DVD collection containing Roots: The Gift, along with the earlier Roots and Roots: The Next Generations miniseries.

== See also ==
- List of films featuring slavery
- List of Christmas films
