= The African (Courlander novel) =

Book by Harold Courlander

- First edition
- Author: Harold Courlander
- Language: English
- Published: 1967
- Publisher: Crown Publishers
- Publication place: United States

The African is a 1967 novel by Harold Courlander. By 1978 14,000 hard-cover and 130,000 paperback copies of the book were sold.

== Plot ==
A twelve-year-old African boy, Hwesuhunu, is kidnapped from his homeland by French slave traders, and endures the terrors of the Middle Passage and being sold into slavery. Hwesuhunu is brought to the island of Saint Lucia, and is later sold to a Georgia plantation for US$100.

He is assigned the new name of Wes Hunu, and spends years as a slave before escaping and living for a time with Native Americans. Hwesuhunu goes to Freedom Island, a refuge located in a swamp, that sheltered escaped slaves. But the refuge is governed by a cruel bully, so Hwesuhunu leaves in search of a better home.

== Roots controversy ==
The novel became the subject of controversy when it was revealed that author Alex Haley had plagiarized sections of The African for his own 1976 novel Roots, which later was made into a 1977 television miniseries, a 1979 sequel miniseries, and a 2016 television miniseries remake.

In 1978, Haley paid Courlander and his publisher $650,000 (~$2.51 million in 2025) as out-of-court settlement of the lawsuit.
