= Roots (2016 miniseries) =

2016 American miniseries

- Promotional poster
- Genre: Historical drama
- Based on: Roots: The Saga of an American Family by Alex Haley
- Written by: Lawrence Konner; Mark Rosenthal; Alison McDonald; Charles Murray
- Directed by: Bruce Beresford; Thomas Carter; Phillip Noyce; Mario Van Peebles
- Starring: Malachi Kirby; Forest Whitaker; Anna Paquin; Laurence Fishburne; Jonathan Rhys Meyers; Anika Noni Rose; T.I.; Chad L. Coleman; Emayatzy Corinealdi; Matthew Goode; Derek Luke; Mekhi Phifer; James Purefoy; Erica Tazel; Regé-Jean Page; Lane Garrison
- Narrated by: Ike Amadi
- Country of origin: United States
- Original language: English
- No. of episodes: 4

Production
- Executive producers: Will Packer; Marc Toberoff; Mark Wolper; LeVar Burton; Korin Huggins; Dirk Hoogstra; Michael Stiller
- Producers: Ann Kindberg; George Parra; Alissa M. Kantrow
- Cinematography: Peter Menzies, Jr. Sharone Meir
- Editor: James Wilcox
- Running time: 386 minutes
- Production companies: The Wolper Organization; Will Packer Productions; Marctoberoff Productions; A+E Studios

Original release
- Network: History Channel
- Release: May 30 – June 2, 2016

Roots is a 2016 American miniseries and a remake of the 1977 miniseries with the same name, based on Alex Haley's 1976 novel, Roots: The Saga of an American Family, which follows an 18th-century Mandinka man who is enslaved and shipped from The Gambia to the Colony of Virginia, and his descendants. It first aired on May 30, 2016, and stars Malachi Kirby, Forest Whitaker, Anna Paquin, Laurence Fishburne, Jonathan Rhys Meyers, Anika Noni Rose, T.I. and South African actress Nokuthula Ledwaba. It was produced on a budget of $50 million.

== Plot ==
Part 1

In 1767, Kunta Kinte (Malachi Kirby) is a young Mandinka man from Jufureh in The Gambia, a country in West Africa. One day, Kunta is taken into the jungle with other Mandinka youth as part of their training to become warriors. During a test where Kunta is made to run through the jungle in a certain period of time, he sees a man's dead body lying in a canoe. Kunta then sees the rival Koro family in another group of canoes, hunting for slaves to sell to European slave traders. After returning home, Kunta reports his discovery to his teachers, who decided in light of this information that Kunta's training must come to an end. After undergoing an initiation ceremony and becoming a warrior, Kunta tells his father that he wishes to attend a university in Timbuktu; in response to his father disagreeing with him, Kunta runs off into the jungle where he meets up with his lover, Jinna. The two are suddenly surrounded by the Koro family, who intend to ransom Kunta back to his relatives. However, Kunta manages to escape, killing one of the Koro family in the process before being recaptured. The Koro family subsequently decide to sell Kunta and Jinna to the crew of the Lord Ligonier, a British slave ship.

After Kunta and Jinna are brought on board the Lord Ligonier, they discover that Kunta's uncle, Silla, has also been sold into slavery. Silla attempts to escape but is thwarted by a sailor who shoots him in the arm. The captives are then brought to the ship's hold and chained next to each other. During the voyage, Jinna attempts to jump off the ship, but is caught and taken to the captain's cabin. This infuriates the other captives, and Silla's arm is cut off by the crew in order to prevent a slave rebellion by intimidating the other prisoners. However, Kunta leads a group of captives to attack the crew anyway, but this attempt fails and the crew manage to regain control of the ship. Eventually, the Lord Ligonier arrives in Annapolis, Maryland, where Kunta is sold at an auction to John Waller (James Purefoy), a planter who owns a tobacco plantation in Virginia. Kunta is subsequently renamed Toby, and placed under the care of Fiddler (Forest Whitaker), an enslaved musician whose real name is Henry. Kunta gradually adjusts to his new life of slavery over following months, but constantly harbors dreams of escaping.

One night, while singing a traditional African song, Fiddler reveals to Kunta that he once heard his grandmother singing the same song, implying that she was a Mandinka woman who was sold into slavery. Kunta then finds a sharp object, which he uses to cut his chains. With the aid of Fiddler, Kunta makes an escape attempt on Christmas, but is caught and flogged by a cruel Irish overseer, Connelly (Tony Curran). Connelly forces Kunta to call himself "Toby", though Kunta infuriates him by repeatedly stating that his name is Kunta Kinte. After Kunta, bloodied by the repeated whippings, finally gives into Connelly and calls himself Toby, Connelly lets Fiddler attend to his injured back. As Kunta gives up his dreams of ever returning to Africa, Fiddler tells him to always remember his real name, no matter what slave name he is given.

Part 2

After the American Revolutionary War breaks out, Kunta escapes Waller's plantation, kills Connelly and makes contact with a detachment of British Army cavalrymen, as he has heard of a proclamation by Lord Dunmore offering slaves their freedom if they fight for the British. Kunta subsequently enlists in the Ethiopian Regiment and befriends another runaway named Carlton. The regiment is then sent to fight against Patriot forces in the Battle of Great Bridge. However, Kunta realizes that with no weapons the regiment was only intended to serve as cannon fodder and escapes with Carlton as the Patriots rout the British. Carlton is killed by an unknown gunman and Kunta is eventually recaptured; as punishment for escaping, his right foot is chopped off. Kunta and Fiddler are later sold by John to his brother, Dr. William Waller (Matthew Goode) as payment for outstanding debts. The war eventually ends and the United States celebrates its independence. Kunta marries Belle (Emayatzy Corinealdi), an enslaved woman who nursed him back to health, and they have a daughter together. Fiddler and Kunta take the baby into the woods for a Mandinka naming ceremony. They are suddenly surrounded by a slave patrol, which murders Fiddler after he distracts them so Kunta and his daughter could slip away. Kunta names the baby Kizzy (Saniyya Sidney), meaning "stay put" in the Mandinka language, in hopes of keeping their family together.

Kizzy grows up to be a beautiful, bright young woman who is secretly taught how to read by Missy (G Hannelius), Dr. Waller's niece. Kunta trains Kizzy in the ways of a Mandinka warrior, passing on the family's cultural heritage. She also falls in love with another slave named Noah (Mandela Van Peebles). When a tropical cyclone hits the farm, Kizzy and Noah attempt to escape. The next day, Kunta finds Kizzy hiding inside a masonry oven. A search party tracks Noah to a barn, and when he attempts to escape from them, the party kills him. They discover a forged travel pass written by Kizzy, which results in Dr. Waller learning of Kizzy's literacy. Dr. Waller then sells Kizzy to Tom Lea (Jonathan Rhys Meyers), a poor slaveholder in North Carolina. He rapes her the same night she arrives, and nine months later, she gives birth to Lea's son, whom Tom Lea names George. Kizzy contemplates killing her infant, but decides to raise him so she can pass on the family lineage.

Part 3

In 1816, Lea takes George along with him to be trained in how to raise fighting chickens along with another slave, Mingo. After seeing Mingo gain respect from white men for winning a cockfight, George begins to take interest in the sport. However, while George is eager to see the world, Kizzy (Anika Noni Rose) is worried about him spending so much time away from her. Over the years, George (Regé-Jean Page) becomes a skilled chicken breeder, earning Lea large amounts of money and becoming known as "Chicken George". In 1828, after being insulted at a party for his low-class Irish heritage, Lea fights a duel with another slaveholder. George serves as his second, and Tom agrees to allow him to marry Matilda (Erica Tazel), the daughter of an enslaved preacher whom he has been courting.

His position as a trusted house slave is challenged in 1831, when Lea learns of Nat Turner's slave rebellion during a cockfight. Lea, like many other white slaveholders, begins to suspect that all slaves might be planning to rebel. During the chaos, Mingo is beaten, and badly injured. On the way home, Lea points a gun at George after being provoked by white militiamen. When the three return home, they find all of the slave barracks burnt to the ground. When Lea runs off to find his wife, Patricia, George runs into the woods to find his family. Once there, Matilda reveals that it was a group of white men that burnt down the farm, due to thinking that Lea was dead. Mingo eventually dies from his wounds, causing George to become bitter and cold. George reveals to Kizzy that he's known for years that Lea truly is his father.

George and Matilda marry and have several children, the youngest of whom is named Tom after his master. In 1835, George attends another cockfight, where Tom Lea makes a large wager with a visiting British gentleman, Sir Eric Russell (Adam Fergus). Lea promises that if George wins the fight, he will give him his emancipation papers; George wins and celebrates his newfound freedom. However, they fight one more round against Russell and lose, and since Lea does not have the money to pay off his debt, he agrees to give George to Russell to be taken back to England to raise fighting cocks. Before George is taken away, Lea promises to have freed his family before he returns from England.

Part 4

On the eve of the American Civil War, George returns from England after Russell gave him his freedom after 20 years. He returns to Tom Lea's farm, now in ruin, and discovers that while he was gone, his mother Kizzy had died and Lea had never freed the rest of his family. He tracks down Matilda and his family, now owned by a new master, Benjamin Murray (Wayne Pére). Murray allows George to stay with his wife on the plantation, much to the consternation of his secessionist son Frederick Murray (Lane Garrison), who is engaged to marry Nancy Holt (Anna Paquin). George later leaves after discovering that his freedom will be revoked if he remains in the state for more than 90 days.

George's son Tom is now a skilled blacksmith and valued member of the Murray plantation. Tom (Sedale Threatt Jr.) blames his father for abandoning them and initially wants nothing to do with him. When war breaks out, Nancy reveals to Tom that she is a Union spy and tries to enlist him to help her. He initially refuses, but when Frederick and his friends rape his wife, Irene, Tom decides to help. Their plans go awry and Nancy and her slave Jerusalem (Mekhi Phifer) are exposed as spies and are hanged by Frederick.

Meanwhile, George and another black man named Cyrus (T.I.) enlist in the Union Army. They participate in the Battle of Fort Pillow, and watch horrified when surrendering Black Union soldiers are massacred by Confederate troops. George, Cyrus, and Tom flee pursuing Confederate bushwhackers and return to the Murray plantation to learn that all the slaves have been freed by the Thirteenth Amendment to the United States Constitution. The Kinte Family stays for a time as sharecroppers, continuing to work the Murray Plantation in exchange for livestock and food. Once George returns to the Murray Plantation, he, Cyrus, Tom, Matilda and the rest of their family pack up their belongings and head to Tennessee to start a new life. When Frederick threatens them, George shoots him. Once in Tennessee, Tom and his wife have a daughter, the first Kinte born free in America. Many years later, a man named Alex Haley traces his roots to Kunta Kinte and writes a book to honor both his family and all African Americans.

== Cast ==
Number in parentheses indicates how many episodes in which the actor/character appears.

- Malachi Kirby as Kunta Kinte (3)
- Nokuthula Ledwaba as Binta Kinte (2)
- Emayatzy Corinealdi as Belle (2)
- Forest Whitaker as Henry (Fiddler) (3)
- Babs Olusanmokun as Omoro Kinte (2)
- Anika Noni Rose as Kizzy (2)
- E'myri Crutchfield as Young Kizzy (1)
- Saniyya Sidney as Kizzy aged 6 (1)
- Regé-Jean Page as Chicken George (2)
- Erica Tazel as Matilda (2)
- James Purefoy as John Waller (2)
- Katie McGuinness as Elizabeth Waller (2)
- Matthew Goode as Dr. William Waller (2)
- Jonathan Rhys Meyers as Tom Lea (3)
- Shannon Lucio as Patricia Lea (2)
- Chad Coleman as Mingo (1)
- Tony Curran as Connelly (2)
- Adam Fergus as Sir Eric Russell (2)
- Anna Paquin as Nancy Holt (1)
- T.I. as Cyrus (1)
- Derek Luke as Silla Ba Dibba (2)
- G Hannelius as Missy Waller (1)
- Carlacia Grant as Irene (1)
- Mekhi Phifer as Jerusalem (1)
- Sam Malone as Ashford (1)
- Denise Milfort as Ms. Ellen (1)
- Mandela Van Peebles as Noah (1)
- Terence Rosemore as Orly (1)
- Lane Garrison as Frederick Murray (1)
- Sedale Threatt Jr. as Tom (1)
- Brett Rice as William Byrd (1)
- Simona Brown as Jinna (1)
- Chris Obi as Kintango (2)
- Laurence Fishburne as Alex Haley (voiceover narration)
- Zack Fisher reprises his role from the 1977 series as Abraham Lincoln

== Production ==
The History channel commissioned a remake of the miniseries after acquiring rights from David L. Wolper's son, Mark Wolper, and Alex Haley's estate. The new eight-hour miniseries, with Mark Wolper as executive producer, drew on Haley's novel and the original miniseries albeit from a contemporary perspective. In April 2015, it was announced that along with The History Channel, Lifetime and A&E would also broadcast the remake of the Roots miniseries. Will Packer, Marc Toberoff, and Mark Wolper were executive producers, with Lawrence Konner and Mark Rosenthal. LeVar Burton, star of the original series, and Korin Huggins were co-executive producers. Episode 1 was directed by Phillip Noyce, episode 2 by Mario Van Peebles, episode 3 by Thomas Carter, and episode 4 by Bruce Beresford.

In February 2016, a trailer was released and Paul Buccieri, president of A&E and The History Channels, announced that the four night, eight-hour event series would premiere on Memorial Day. The ensemble cast included Forest Whitaker as Fiddler, Anna Paquin as Nancy Holt, Lane Garrison as Frederick Murray, Jonathan Rhys Meyers as Tom Lea, Anika Noni Rose as Kizzy, Tip Harris as Cyrus, Emayatzy Corinealdi as Belle, Matthew Goode as Dr. William Waller, Mekhi Phifer as Jerusalem, James Purefoy as John Waller, and introduced Regé-Jean Page as Chicken George and Malachi Kirby as Kunta Kinte, South African actress Nokuthula Ledwaba as Binta Kinte – Kunta Kinte's mother and Laurence Fishburne as Alex Haley.

== Broadcast and distribution ==
In the United States, Roots aired in four installments of approximately two hours each, from May 30 to June 2, 2016, on History, A&E, and Lifetime.

In Canada, in addition to being available on A&E, whose U.S. feed is carried in Canada directly – but not on the licensed Canadian versions of History or Lifetime – the series was stream on CraveTV in fall 2016.

New Zealand state broadcaster TVNZ aired the first episode on TV One on Sunday, July 3 at 8:30 p.m. (New Zealand Standard Time), and screened the remaining 3 episodes on the following 3 Sundays (July 10, 17, and 24th). In Australia, SBS aired the episodes on July 27 and 28, August 3 and 4, 2016.

Roots premiered on BBC Four in the United Kingdom on February 8, 2017.

Expat Persian channel Manoto aired Roots for Iran, Afghanistan, and Tajikistan in July 2017.

== Reception ==
Roots was praised for the acting abilities of the cast, the faithfulness to the original, and the modern changes. On Rotten Tomatoes, the series has a rating of 98%, based on 41 reviews, with an average rating of 8.31/10. The site's critical consensus reads, "A powerfully impressive – and still relevant – update on a television classic, Roots boasts remarkable performances, deep emotion, and occasionally jarring beauty." On Metacritic the series has a score of 83 out of 100, based on 33 critics, indicating "universal acclaim". The series received a Primetime Emmy nomination for Outstanding Limited Series.

=== Accolades ===
| Year | Award | Category | Recipient(s) | Result | Ref. |
|---|---|---|---|---|---|
| 2016 | 7th Critics' Choice Television Awards | Best Movie or Miniseries | | Nominated | |
| 2016 | 7th Critics' Choice Television Awards | Supporting Actor – Movie or Miniseries | Lane Garrison | Nominated | |
| 2016 | 7th Critics' Choice Television Awards | Supporting Actor – Movie or Miniseries | Forest Whitaker | Nominated | |
| 2016 | 7th Critics' Choice Television Awards | Supporting Actress – Movie or Miniseries | Anna Paquin | Nominated | |
| 2016 | 68th Primetime Emmy Awards | Outstanding Limited Series | | Nominated | |
| 2016 | 68th Primetime Creative Arts Emmy Awards | Outstanding Short Form Nonfiction or Reality Series | Roots: A New Version | Nominated | |
| 2016 | 68th Primetime Creative Arts Emmy Awards | Outstanding Narrator | Laurence Fishburne | Nominated | |
| 2016 | 68th Primetime Creative Arts Emmy Awards | Outstanding Casting for a Limited Series, Movie, or Special | Victoria Thomas, Moonyeenn Lee, Leo Davids, Lissy Holm, and Meagan Lewis | Nominated | |
| 2016 | 68th Primetime Creative Arts Emmy Awards | Outstanding Costumes for a Period/Fantasy Series, Limited Series, or Movie | Ruth E. Carter, Diana Cilliers, Megan "Bijou" Coates, Hetta Burger, Meagan McLaughlin Luster, Gillian Gregg (for: "Night One") | Nominated | |
| 2016 | 68th Primetime Creative Arts Emmy Awards | Outstanding Hairstyling for a Limited Series or Movie | Tony Ward, Adam Gaeta, Talli Pachter, Sherri B. Hamilton (for: "Part One") | Nominated | |
| 2016 | 68th Primetime Creative Arts Emmy Awards | Outstanding Make-up for a Limited Series or Movie (Non-Prosthetic) | Aimee Stuit, Christa Schoeman, Niqui da Silva, Paige Reeves, Marike Liebetrau (for: "Night One") | Nominated | |
| 2016 | 68th Primetime Creative Arts Emmy Awards | Outstanding Sound Editing for a Limited Series, Movie, or Special | Gary Megregian, Stuart Martin, Andrew Dawson, Steve M. Stuhr, Jason Krane, Christian Buenaventura, Timothy A. Cleveland, Paul Diller, John Snider, Marcello Dubaz, Michael Sana, Daniel Salas, Matt Shelton, Noel Vought, Ginger Geary (for: "Part Two") | Nominated | |
| 2017 | Visual Effects Society Awards 2016 | Outstanding Supporting Visual Effects in a Photoreal Episode | Simon Hansen, Paul Kalil, Theo le Roux Priest, Wicus Labuschange, Max Poolman (for "Night One") | Nominated | |

== See also ==
- List of films featuring slavery
