= Harold Courlander =

American anthropologist

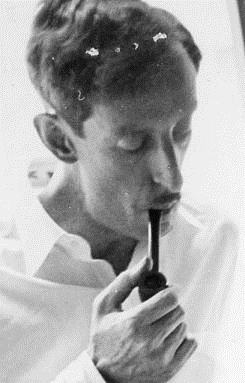
- Courlander in 1955
- Born: September 18, 1908; Indianapolis, Indiana, U.S.
- Died: March 15, 1996 (aged 87); United States
- Education: University of Michigan
- Occupations: Novelist, folklorist, anthropologist
- Writing career
- Language: English
- Genres: Folklore, non-fiction, fiction

Harold Courlander (September 18, 1908 – March 15, 1996) was an American novelist, folklorist, and anthropologist and an expert in the study of Haitian life. The author of 35 books and plays and numerous scholarly articles, Courlander specialized in the study of African, Caribbean, Afro-American, and Native American cultures. He took a special interest in oral literature, cults, and Afro-American cultural connections with Africa.

== Life and work ==
Courlander was born in Indianapolis, Indiana, the son of the painter David Courlander of Detroit, Michigan. Courlander received a B.A. in English from the University of Michigan in 1931. At the University of Michigan, he received three Avery Hopwood Awards (one in drama and two in literary criticism). He attended graduate school at the University of Michigan and Columbia University. He spent time in the 1930s on a farm in Romeo, Michigan. There, he built a one-room log cabin in the woods where he spent much of his time writing.

With the prize money from the Hopwood Awards, Courlander took his first field trip to Haiti, inspired by the writings of William Buehler Seabrook. In 1939, he published his first book about Haitian life entitled Haiti Singing. Over the next 30 years, he traveled to Haiti more than 20 times. His research focused on religious practices, African retentions, oral traditions, folklore, music, and dance. His book, The Drum and the Hoe: Life and Lore of the Haitian People, published in 1960, became a classic text for the study of Haitian culture.

Courlander also took numerous field trips to the southern United States, recording folk music in the 1940s and 1950s. From 1947 to 1960, he served as a general editor of Ethnic Folkways Library (he actually devised the label name) and recorded more than 30 albums of music from different cultures (e.g., the cultures of Indonesia, Ethiopia, West Africa, Haiti, and Cuba). In 1950, he also did field recordings in Alabama later transcribed by John Benson Brooks.

In the 1960s, Courlander began a series of field trips to the American Southwest to study the oral literature and culture of the Hopi Indians. His collection of folk tales, People of the Short Blue Corn: Tales and Legends of the Hopi Indians, was issued in 1970 and was quickly recognized as an indispensable work in the study of oral literature.

From 1942 to 1943, during World War II, Harold Courlander served as a historian for the Air Transport Command for the Douglas Aircraft Project 19 in Gura, Eritrea. Courlander then worked as a writer and editor for the Office of War Information in New York City and Bombay, India, from 1943 to 1946. From 1946 until 1956, he worked as a news writer and news analyst for the Voice of America in New York City. He was an information specialist and speech writer for the U.S. Mission to the United Nations from 1956 to 1957. He was a writer and editor for The United Nations Review from 1957 to 1960. From 1960 until 1974, Courlander was African specialist, Caribbean specialist, feature writer, and senior news analyst for the Voice of America in Washington, D.C.

== Roots and plagiarism ==
Courlander wrote seven novels, his most famous being The African, published in 1967. The novel was the story of a slave's capture in Africa, his experiences aboard a slave ship, and his struggle to retain his native culture in a hostile new world. In 1978, Courlander filed suit in the U.S. District Court for the Southern District of New York, charging that Alex Haley, the author of Roots, had copied 81 passages from his novel. Courlander's pre-trial memorandum in the copyright infringement lawsuit claimed:

Defendant Haley had access to and substantially copied from The African. Without The African, Roots would have been a very different and less successful novel, and indeed it is doubtful that Mr. Haley could have written Roots without The African. ... Mr. Haley copied language, thoughts, attitudes, incidents, situations, plot and character.

The lawsuit did not allege that The African's plot was copied in its entirety, as the two novels differ in many plot points. Courlander's novel depicts a successful revolt on the slave ship, a shipwreck in the French colony of Saint-Domingue, a fugitive life as escaped slaves, recapture by French troops, and then transport to New Orleans in 1802. Haley's novel begins before the American Revolution, depicts disease striking down the slaves before they could revolt, and shows the ship arriving successfully in the British colony of Maryland. The copying in Roots was in the form of specific ideas and passages. For example, strikingly similar language is used to describe an infestation of lice on the slave ship:

Courlander, The African	Haley, Roots
To the damp sick foulness in the belly of the ship there came to be added another torture—lice. ... They crawled on the face and drank at the corners of the eyes. ... If the fingers caught the predator, it was killed between the fingernails.	But the lice preferred to bite him on the face, and they would suck at the liquids in the corners of Kunta's eyes, or the snot draining from his nostrils. He would squirm his body, with his fingers darting and pinching to crush any lice that he might trap between his nails.

In his Expert Witness Report submitted to federal court, Professor of English Michael Wood of Columbia University stated:

The evidence of copying from The African in both the novel and the television dramatization of Roots is clear and irrefutable. The copying is significant and extensive. ... Roots ... plainly uses The African as a model: as something to be copied at some times, and at other times to be modified, but always it seems, to be consulted. ... Roots takes from The African phrases, situations, ideas, aspects of style and plot. Roots finds in The African essential elements for its depiction of such things as a slave's thoughts of escape, the psychology of an old slave, the habits of mind of the hero, and the whole sense of life on an infamous slave ship. Such things are the life of a novel; and when they appear in Roots, they are the life of someone else's novel.

During a five-week trial in federal district court, presiding U.S. District Court Judge Robert J. Ward stated, "Copying there is, period." Passages from The African were found stapled to a manuscript page from Roots. However, Alex Haley maintained throughout the trial that he had not even heard of The African until the year after Roots was published, and speculated that someone else had given him the photocopied passages. After the trial, Joseph Bruchac, an instructor in black and African history at Skidmore College, stated that he had recommended Courlander's novel to Haley when he visited Skidmore in 1970. Bruchac remembered driving home three miles to fetch his own copy of The African and give it to Haley, who promised to read it "on the plane."

Courlander and Haley settled the case out of court for $650,000 and a statement that "Alex Haley acknowledges and regrets that various materials from The African by Harold Courlander found their way into his book, Roots."

== Family life ==
Courlander married Ella Schneideman in 1939. They had one child, Erika Courlander. They later divorced.

Courlander married Emma Meltzer June 18, 1949. They had two children, Michael Courlander and Susan Jean Courlander.

== Selected bibliography and discography ==
=== Novels ===
- The Caballero, 1940.
- The Big Old World of Richard Creeks, 1962, 1990.
- The African, 1967, 1977, 1993.
- The Mesa of Flowers, 1977, 2006.
- The Master of the Forge, 1983, 1996.
- The Son of the Leopard, 1974, 2002.
- The Bordeaux Narrative, 1988, 1990.
- Journey of the Grey Fox People (reissue of The Mesa of Flowers), 1977, 2006.

=== Nonfiction ===
- A Treasury of African Folklore, 1975, 1995.
- A Treasury of Afro-American Folklore, 1976, 1995.
- Tales of Yoruba Gods and Heroes, 1973, 1974, 2001.
- The Heart of the Ngoni: Heroes of the African Kingdom of Segu (with Ousmane Sako), 1982.
- The Drum and the Hoe: Life and Lore of the Haitian People, 1960, 1985, 1988.
- Negro Folk Music, U.S.A., 1963, 1992.
- Haiti Singing, 1939, 1973.
- Big Falling Snow (with Albert Yava), 1978, 1982.
- Hopi Voices: Recollections, Traditions and Narratives of the Hopi Indians, 1982.
- Negro Songs from Alabama (music transcribed by John Benson Brooks), 1960, 1963, 1988.
- The Fourth World of the Hopis, 1971, 1987, 1999.
- Shaping Our Times: What the United Nations Is and Does, 1960.
- Vodoun in Haitian Culture (in Religion and Politics in Haiti), 1966.
- On Recognizing the Human Species, 1960.

=== Folklore and folktales ===
- The Cow-Tail Switch and Other West African Stories (with George Herzog), 1947, 1987.
- The Hat-Shaking Dance and Other Ashanti Tales from Ghana, 1957, 1985.
- Olode the Hunter and Other Tales from Nigeria, 1968, 1996.
- The King's Drum and Other African Stories, 1962, 1990.
- The Crest and the Hide and Other African Stories of Heroes, Chiefs, Bards, Hunters, Sorcerers and Common People, 1982.
- The Fire on the Mountain and Other Ethiopian Stories (with Wolf Leslau), 1950, 1995.
- People of the Short Blue Corn: Tales and Legends of the Hopi Indians, 1970, 1995, 1998.
- The Tiger's Whisker and Other Tales from Asia and the Pacific, 1959, 1995.
- Terrapin's Pot of Sense, 1957, 1985.
- The Piece of Fire and Other Haitian Tales, 1964, 1992.
- Kantchil's Lime Pit and Other Stories from Indonesia, 1950.
- Uncle Bouqui of Haiti, 1942.
- Ride with the Sun, 1955, 1983.

=== Plays ===
- Swamp Mud, 1936.
- Home to Langford County, 1938.

=== Articles ===
- "Musical Instruments of Haiti", The Musical Quarterly, July 1941.
- "Profane Songs of the Haitian People", Journal of Negro History, July 1942.
- "The Ethiopian Game of Gobeta", The Negro History Bulletin, October 1943.
- "Gods of the Haitian Mountains", Journal of Negro History, July 1944.
- "Abakwa Meeting, Guanabacoa", Journal of Negro History, 1944.
- "Notes from an Abyssinian Diary", The Musical Quarterly, July 1944
- "Dance and Dance-Drama, Haiti", The Function of Dance, Human Society, 1944.
- "Incident, the Valley of Gura", The Negro History Bulletin, 1947.
- "Gods of Haiti", Tomorrow, Autumn 1954.
- "The Loa of Haiti: New World African Deities," 1955.
- "Three Sonike Tales", African Arts, November 1978.
- "Roots, The African, and the Whiskey Jug Case", The Village Voice, April 9, 1979.
- "Recording in Cuba in 1941", Resound: A Quarterly of the Archives of Traditional Music, July 1984.
- "Recording in Alabama in 1950", Resound: A Quarterly of the Archives of Traditional Music, October 1985.
- "Reflections on the Meaning of a Haitian Cult Song", Bulletin Du Bureau National D'ethnolgie, 1986.
- "Kunta Kinte's Struggle to be African", Phylon, December 1986.
- "Recording in Eritrea in 1942-43", Resound: A Quarterly of the Archives of Traditional Music, April 1987.
- "Some N.Y. Recording Episodes", Resound: A Quarterly of the Archives of Traditional Music, October 1988.
- "The Emperor Wore Clothes: Visiting Haile Selassie, 1943", The American Scholar, March 1989.
- "Recollections of Haiti, the 1930s and '40s", African Arts, April 1990.
- "Recording on the Hopi Reservation, 1968-1981", Resound: A Quarterly of the Archives of Traditional Music, April 1990.
- "How I Got My Log Cabin", Chronicle: The Quarterly Magazine of the Historical Society of Michigan, 1991.

== Awards, grants, fellowships, and honors ==
Courlander received numerous awards, grants, and fellowships during his lifetime, including:

- The Newbery Honor Book Award in 1948 for his book The Cow-Tail Switch and Other West African Stories (with George Herzog)
- Guggenheim Fellowships and Grants in 1948, 1953, and 1958
- Wenner-Gren Foundation Grants for Anthropological Research in 1956, 1960, 1962, and 1970
- Franz Boas Fund Grant, 1939
- Laura Ingalls Wilder Medal Nomination for Contributions to Children's Literature in 1979
- American Library Association "Best Books for Young Adults" list in 1969 for his book The African
- Parents' Choice "Remarkable" Award in 1982 for his book The Crest and The Hide
- The Outstanding Achievement Award from the University of Michigan in 1984
- Avery Hopwood Award in Drama, 1931
- Avery Hopwood Award in Literary Criticism, 1931
- Avery Hopwood Award in Literary Criticism, 1932
- American Philosophical Society grants-in-aid for work regarding Haiti and Africa, 1946, 1953, 1957
- The Viking Fund grant-in-aid for study of African-American folk music in southern U.S., 1949
- American Council of Learned Societies research and publication grants, 1939, 1940, 1953
- Ford Foundation publication grant, 1958
- American Library Association's "Notable Children's Books" list for The Son of the Leopard, 1975
- American Library Association's "Notable Children's Books" list for The Crest and the Hide, 1982
- Notable Children's Trade Books in the Field of Social Studies for The Crest and the Hide, 1982
