= Kunta Kinte =

Character in Alex Haley's Roots

- LeVar Burton as Kunta Kinte in the TV miniseries Roots
- First appearance: Roots: The Saga of an American Family (1976)

In-universe information
- Family: Omoro (father); Binta (mother); Kizzy (daughter); George (grandson); Tom (great-grandson)

Kunta Kinte (/ˈkuːntɑː ˈkɪnteɪ/ KOON-tah KIN-tay) is the main character from the 1976 novel Roots: The Saga of an American Family by American author Alex Haley. Kunta Kinte was based on family oral tradition accounts of one of Haley's ancestors, a Muslim Gambian man who was born around 1767, enslaved, and taken to America where he died around 1822. Haley said that his account of Kunta's life in Roots is a mixture of fact and fiction.

Kunta Kinte's life story figured in two American television series based on the book: the original 1977 TV miniseries Roots, and a 2016 remake of the same title. In the original miniseries, the character was portrayed as a teenager by LeVar Burton and as an adult by John Amos. In the 2016 miniseries, he is portrayed by Malachi Kirby. Burton reprised his role in the 1988 TV movie Roots: The Gift.

== Biography in Roots novel ==
According to the book Roots, Kunta Kinte was born circa 1750 in the Mandinka village of Jufureh, in The Gambia. He was raised in a Muslim family. In 1767, while Kunta was searching for wood to make a drum for his brother, four men chased him, surrounded him, and took him captive. Kunta awoke to find himself blindfolded, gagged, bound, and a prisoner. He and others were put on the slave ship the Lord Ligonier for a four-month Middle Passage voyage to North America.

Kunta Kinte survived the trip to Maryland and was sold to a John Waller (1741–1775), son of William Waller (1714–1760) and grandson of John Waller (1673–1754) (Reynolds in the 1977 miniseries), a Virginia plantation owner in Spotsylvania County, who renamed him Toby (named by John's wife Elizabeth in the 2016 remake). He rejected the name imposed upon him by his owners and refused to speak to others. After being recaptured during the last of his four escape attempts, the slave catchers gave him an ultimatum: he would be castrated or have his right foot cut off. He chose to have his foot cut off, and the men cut off the front half of his right foot. As the years passed, Kunta, now owned by John's brother Dr. William Waller, resigned himself to his fate and became more open and sociable with his fellow slaves, while never forgetting his identity and origin.

Kunta Kinte married an enslaved woman named Bell and they had a daughter named Kizzy (Keisa, in Mandinka), which in Kunta's native language means "you sit down" or "you stay put", to protect her from being sold away as Bell had been sold away from her two infant children many decades earlier. When Kizzy was in her late teens, she was sold away to North Carolina when William Waller discovered that she had written a fake traveling pass for an enslaved young man, Noah, with whom she was in love. She had been taught to read and write secretly by Missy Anne, the niece of the plantation owner. Her new owner, Thomas Lea (Moore in the 1977 miniseries), immediately raped her. He fathered her only child, whom he named George after his first slave (or after his own father, according to the 2016 miniseries). George spent his life with the tag "Chicken George", because of his assigned duties of tending to his master's cockfighting birds.

In the novel, Kizzy never learns her parents' fate. She spends the remainder of her life as a field hand on the Lea plantation in North Carolina. According to the 1977 miniseries, Kizzy is taken back to visit the Reynolds plantation later in life. She discovers that her mother was sold off to another plantation and that her father died of a broken heart two years later, in 1822. She finds his grave, on which she crosses out his slave name Toby and writes his real name Kunta Kinte instead. Kizzy is Haley's only ancestor in the genealogy link to Kunta Kinte, who spent the majority of her life in slavery.

The latter part of the book tells of the generations between Kizzy and Alex Haley, describing their suffering, losses, and eventual triumphs in America. Alex Haley claimed to be a seventh-generation descendant of Kunta Kinte.

=== Historical accuracy ===
Haley claimed that his sources for the origins of Kinte were oral family tradition and a man he found in the Gambia named Kebba Kanga Fofana, who claimed to be a griot with knowledge about the Kinte clan. He described them as a family in which the men were blacksmiths, descended from a marabout named Kairaba Kunta Kinte, originally from Mauritania. Haley quoted Fofana as telling him: "About the time the king's soldiers came, the eldest of these four sons, Kunta, went away from this village to chop wood and was never seen again."

However, journalists and historians later discovered that Fofana was not a griot. In retelling the Kinte story, Fofana changed crucial details, including his father's name, his brothers' names, his age, and even omitted the year when he went missing. At one point, he even placed Kunta Kinte in a generation that was alive in the twentieth century. It was also discovered that elders and griots could not give reliable genealogical lineages before the mid-19th century, with the single apparent exception of Kunta Kinte. It appears that Haley had told so many people about Kunta Kinte that he had created a case of circular reporting. Instead of independent confirmation of the Kunta Kinte story, he was actually hearing his own words repeated back to him.

After Haley's book became nationally famous, American author Harold Courlander noted that the section describing Kinte's life was apparently taken from Courlander's own 1967 novel The African. Haley at first dismissed the charge, but later issued a public statement affirming that Courlander's book had been the source, and Haley attributed the error to a mistake of one of his assistant researchers. Courlander sued Haley for copyright infringement, which Haley settled out of court.

However, despite the inconsistencies with Haley's chronology, academics including historian John Thornton, director of the African American Studies program at Boston University, have noted that a person named Kunta Kinte could have lived in the Gambia in the 1700s and been enslaved.

== In popular culture ==
Kunta Kinte has inspired a reggae riddim of the same name. This started off life as a track called Beware Of Your Enemies released from Jamaica's Channel One. A dub version, put out in 1976 by Channel One house band The Revolutionaries became a sound system anthem for many years on dubplate, and inspired a UK version produced by Mad Professor in 1981. It has also inspired jungle covers.

There is an annual Kunta Kinte Heritage Festival held in Maryland.

In the 1987 song "How Ya Like Me Now", an early milestone in his feud with fellow rapper LL Cool J, Kool Moe Dee states that his adversary must bow down to him or suffer Kunta Kinte's punishment: "I'm gonna ask him, 'Who's the best?' And if he don't say, 'Moe Dee', I'll take my whip and make him call himself Toby."

The 1988 comedy film Coming to America jokingly references Kunta Kinte, in an homage to Roots (John Amos, who played a supporting role in Coming to America as the father of the protagonist's love interest, played the adult version of Kunta Kinte in the 1977 miniseries).

Ice Cube mentions Kunta Kinte in his 1991 song "No Vaseline" where he disses members of his former group N.W.A where he compares MC Ren to Kunta Kinte stating "So don't believe what Ren say. 'Cause he's goin' out like Kunte Kinte".

In The Fresh Prince of Bel-Air episode "Will Gets a Job" (Season 2, Episode 3), after uncle Phil (James Avery) tells him he can't hang out with his friends or watch TV, Will Smith (Will Smith) asks "Why don't you just do me like Kunta Kinte and cut off my foot?". The episode aired in April 1991. In the season 3 episode "Mama's Baby, Carlton's Maybe" which aired in October 1992 when Will asks for Carlton's keys to prevent Carlton from eloping, Will says "You're lucky I don't do you like Kunta Kinte and chop off your foot."

In season ten of Bad Girls Club, Shannon insults her housemate Valentina by calling her "Kunta Kinte"

Kendrick Lamar's 2015 song "King Kunta" was inspired by the character. Afrikan Boy released a song called Mr. Kunta Kinte in 2016.

Athlete Colin Kaepernick wore a T-shirt with "Kunta Kinte" emblazoned on it to a controversial NFL workout. In CNN's interpretation, "Kaepernick appeared to use the reference to make a statement: He will not change who he is to appease the powers that be."

== See also ==
- Kunta Kinteh Island in the Gambia
- List of slaves
