= David Courlander =

American painter

David Courlander (September 10, 1866 – June 12, 1961) was a self-taught ("primitive") artist who painted scenes of everyday American life. He began painting when he was 85 years old (he lived to age 94). Many of his paintings now reside in the Smithsonian American Art Museum's permanent collection and have been put on public display as part of various Smithsonian art exhibitions.

== Early life ==
David Courlander was born in Bay City, Michigan on September 10, 1866. The Courlander family soon moved to Detroit, where they lived on Gratiot Avenue (which Courlander described as a mud road with wooden sidewalks). As a young man, Courlander worked in a general merchandise store in Frankfort Station, Illinois, and subsequently worked in Kansas City and other Midwestern cities as a window dresser. He had a men's tailoring establishment of his own in Indianapolis and during World War I, moved (with his wife, the former Tillie Oppenheim, and their three children) to Detroit. During the Great Depression of the 1930s, after the death of his wife, he lived with his daughter, Adelaide, and her family on a farm near Romeo, Michigan.

=== Family ===
David Courlander was the son of Jewish family, Aaron Jacob Courlander (born in Mitau, Courland, modern-day Latvia) and Adelaide Hirsch (born in Barweiler, Germany). David Courlander had four sisters: Anna, Etta, Bertha, and Julia; one brother, Eli; and one known half-brother, Israel Harris Courlander. David married Tillie Oppenheim in 1895 and they had two daughters, Adelaide Courlander (became Frane) and Berthe Courlander (became Langer, then Nichols); and one son, Harold Courlander.

== Painting career ==
Courlander began painting in 1952 when he was 85 years old and continued until a few months prior to his death in 1961. Courlander began to exhibit his paintings (both oils and watercolors) at various community centers in the Detroit area, and in 1953 had a one-man show at the Associated American Artists gallery in New York. Reeves Lewenthal, director of the gallery, said that it was the first time in the gallery's history that the works of an untutored artist had qualified for such a show. Said Lewenthal, "[Courlander] is a fantastic primitive who paints completely from memory. He has an inventive spirit uniquely his own. He is on the same level as Grandma Moses. He is definitely a rare find in the art world." In fact, Courlander was affectionately dubbed "Grandpa Moses" by the Detroit press; other times he was referred to as "Grandpa Courlander of Michigan." Courlander's paintings included landscapes, still lifes, country scenes, and historical and religious occasions. Courlander's specific subject matter varied widely, ranging from village and farm scenes of the 1870s to St. Patrick Day parades, circus themes, the backwoods and hills of Michigan and Indiana, fishing scenes, horseracing, and scenes of pre-1900 Chicago. Following his successful first show, Courlander attracted considerable attention and his paintings were exhibited at other galleries in New York, New Jersey, and Michigan. In 1958, several of his paintings were selected for the Smithsonian Institution's national touring exhibition of American Primitive Artists. Eight paintings by David Courlander are currently in the Smithsonian Institution's permanent art collection, and his paintings have been displayed by the Smithsonian American Art Museum and by the National Museum of American History.

== Art exhibitions ==
- Smithsonian Institution's National Museum of American Art (museum renamed Smithsonian Museum of American Art), "In Their Own Way," 1981.
- Smithsonian Institution's National Museum of American History, Granite Gallery, 1983.
- Smithsonian Institution's American Primitive Paintings Traveling Exhibition, 1958.
- Kundig Center, Detroit, Michigan, circa 1953.
- Associated American Artists, New York, NY, 1953.
- The Detroit Institute of Arts, Annual Exhibition for Michigan Artists, 1954.
- Rabin and Krueger Gallery, Newark, NJ, 1954.
- New York Public Library Exhibition, 1956.
- Ten Mile Branch Jewish Community Center, Detroit, MI, 1956.
- 2nd Annual Artists' Exhibition, Temple Israel Sisterhood, Detroit, MI, 1958.
- "G" Gallery, New York, NY, 1958.

== Museums and special collections ==
- The Smithsonian American Art Museum, Washington, DC.
- The Smithsonian Institution's National Museum of American History, Washington, DC.
- Mugar Memorial Library, Department of Special Collections, Boston, MA.
- University of Michigan Museum of Art, Ann Arbor, MI.
- New Mexico Museum of Fine Arts, Santa Fe, NM.
- The Albuquerque Museum, Albuquerque, NM.
