= Roots: The Saga of an American Family =

1976 novel by Alex Haley

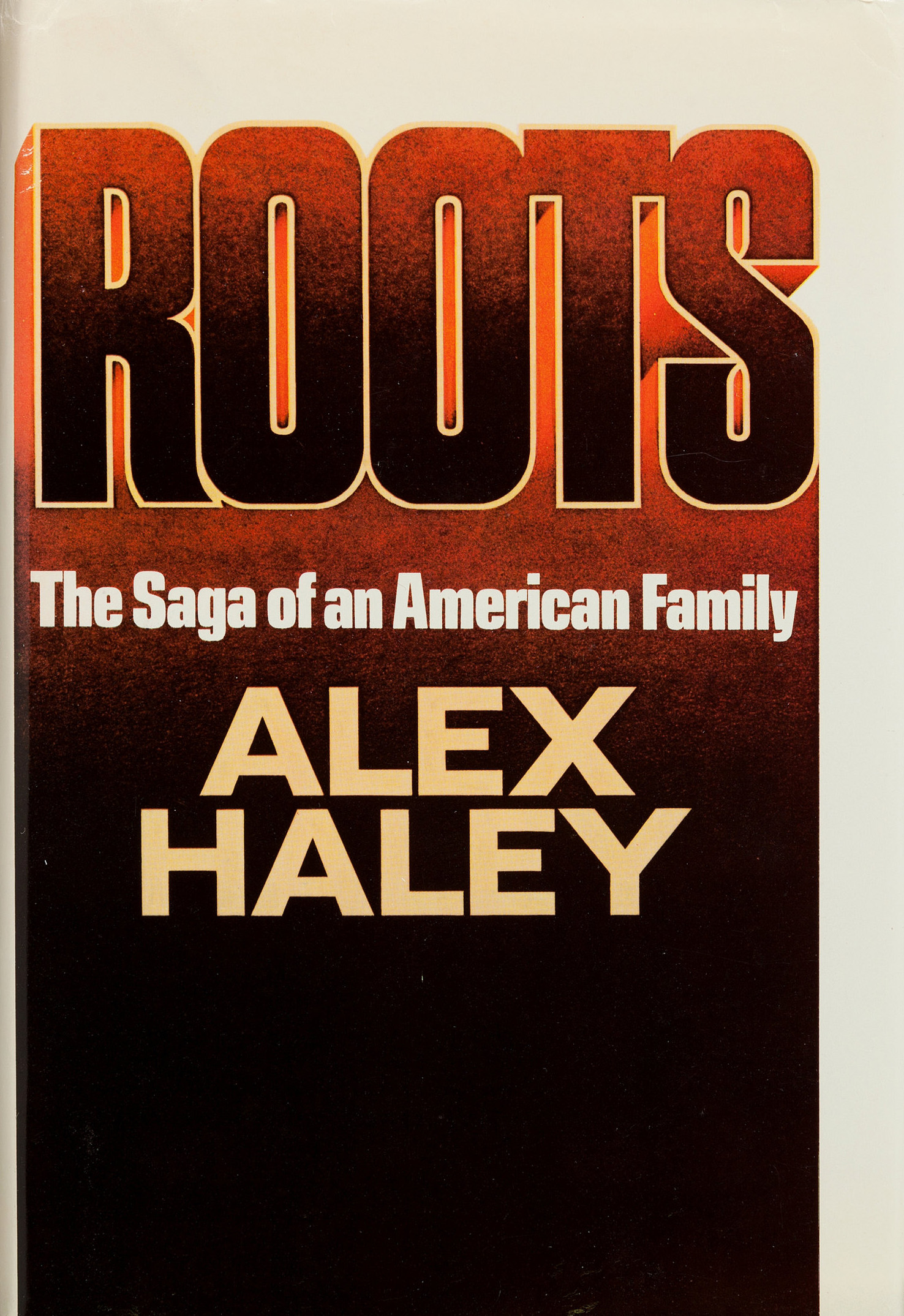
- First edition cover
- Author: Alex Haley
- Language: English
- Genre: Historical fiction
- Publisher: Doubleday
- Publication date: August 17, 1976
- Publication place: United States
- Media type: Print (Hardback, paperback)
- Pages: 704 pp (First edition, hardback)
- ISBN: 0-385-03787-2 (First edition, hardback)
- OCLC: 2188350
- Dewey Decimal: 929/.2/0973
- LC Class: E185.97.H24 A33

Roots: The Saga of an American Family is a 1976 novel written by Alex Haley. It tells the story of Kunta Kinte, an 18th-century Mandinka, captured as an adolescent, and transported to North America. It explores his life and those of his descendants in the United States, down to Haley. The novel was adapted as a television miniseries, Roots (1977). The novel spent forty-six weeks on The New York Times Best Seller list, including twenty-two weeks at number one.

The last seven chapters of the novel were later adapted in the form of a second miniseries, Roots: The Next Generations (1979). It stimulated interest in African American genealogy and an appreciation for African American history.

== Plot ==
Roots tells the story of Kunta Kinte—a young man taken from The Gambia when he was 17 and sold as a slave—and seven generations of his descendants in the United States. Kunta, a Mandinka living by the River Gambia, has a difficult but free childhood in his village, Jufureh. His village subsists on farming, and sometimes they lack enough food, as the climate is harsh. Kunta is surrounded by love and traditions. The village has heard of the recent arrival of toubob, men with white skins who smell like wet chickens.

Kunta is excited to see the world. At one point, he sees men in hoods taking away some of the children. This confuses Kunta, but he is excited when he learns that his father, Omoro, will take him on a trip away from Juffure. Omoro and Kunta set off, learning much more about their surroundings. When they return, Kunta brags to all his friends about the journey but does not pay attention to his family's goats, which fall prey to a panther.

Later on, Kunta is taken off for manhood training, with other children of his kafo (division or grade). Kunta learns even more about The Gambia, but he fears the slave trade, which he learns is closer to home than he thought. Kunta passes his training and learns more about Juffure's court system. One day, he witnesses the case of a young girl who was kidnapped by the toubob and came back pregnant. She gives birth to a mixed-race child, and the case is unresolved.

One morning when Kunta is cutting wood to make a drum, he is ambushed by slatees (Black slave traders), is knocked unconscious and taken prisoner. He awakens to find himself gagged and blindfolded. The toubob humiliate Kunta and the other captives by stripping them naked, examining them in every orifice and burning them with hot irons. Kunta is then placed in the brig of a ship, naked and chained. After a nightmarish journey across the Atlantic on board the slave ship Lord Ligonier, he is landed in Annapolis, Maryland. John Waller of Spotsylvania County, Virginia, purchases Kunta at an auction and gives him the name Toby. However, Kunta is headstrong and tries to run away four times. When he is captured for the last time, slave hunters cut off part of his right foot to cripple him.

Kunta is then bought by his master's brother, Dr. William Waller. He becomes a gardener and eventually his master's buggy driver. Kunta also befriends a musician slave named Fiddler. In the aftermath of the American Revolutionary War, Kunta marries Bell, Waller's cook, and together they have a daughter, Kizzy. Kizzy's childhood as a slave is as happy as her parents can make it. She is close friends with John Waller's daughter "Missy" Anne, and she rarely experiences cruelty. Her life changes when she forges a traveling pass for her beau Noah, a field hand. When he is caught and confesses, she is sold away from her family at the age of 16.

Kizzy is bought by Tom Lea, a farmer and chicken fighter who rose from poor beginnings. He rapes and impregnates her, and she gives birth to George, who later becomes known as "Chicken George" when he becomes his father's cockfighting trainer. Chicken George is a philanderer known for his expensive tastes and predilection for alcohol, as much as for his iconic bowler hat and green scarf. He marries Matilda and they have six sons and two daughters, including Tom, who becomes a very good blacksmith. Tom marries Irene, a woman originally owned by the Holt family.

When Tom Lea loses all his money in a cockfight, he sends George to England for several years to pay off the debt, and he sells most of the rest of the family to a slave trader. The trader moves the family to Alamance County, where they become the property of Andrew Murray. The Murrays have no previous experience with farming and are generally kind masters who treat the family well. When the American Civil War ends, however, the Murray slaves decide that, rather than sharecrop for their former masters, they will move from North Carolina to Henning, Tennessee, which is looking for new settlers.

They eventually become a prosperous family. Tom's daughter Cynthia marries Will Palmer, a successful lumber businessman, and their daughter Bertha is the first in the family to go to college. There she meets Simon Haley, who becomes a professor of agriculture. Their son is Alex Haley, the author of the book.

=== Search for his roots ===
Alex Haley also recounts his journey of family discovery and efforts to document his grandmother's stories. He had learned of an ancestor named Kunta Kinte, who was taken as a captive to "'Naplis" and given the slave name Toby. The old African called a guitar a ko, and a river the Kamby Bolongo. While on a reporting trip to London, Haley sees the Rosetta Stone in the British Museum and thinks of his own family's oral traditions. Could he trace his own family lineage back to its origins in Africa?

In the United States census for Alamance County, North Carolina, he finds evidence of his ancestor Tom Murray, the blacksmith. He attempts to locate the likeliest origin of the African words passed down by Kunta Kinte. Dr. Jan Vansina explains that in the Mandinka tongue, kora is a type of stringed instrument, and bolongo is the word for river. Kamby Bolongo could then refer to the Gambia River.

Alex Haley travels to The Gambia and learns of the existence of griots, oral historians who are trained from childhood to memorize and recite the history of a particular village. A good griot could speak for three days without repeating himself. He asks to hear the history of the Kinte clan, which lives in Juffure, and is taken to a griot named Kebba Kanji Fofana. The Kinte clan had originated in Old Mali, moved to Mauritania, and then settled in The Gambia. After about two hours of "so-and-so took as a wife so-and-so, and begat...", Fofana reached Kunta Kinte:

About the time the King's soldiers came, the eldest of these four sons, Kunta, when he had about 16 rains, went away from his village to chop wood to make a drum ... and he was never seen again.

After searching records of British troop movements in the 1760s, Haley finds "Colonel O'Hare's forces" were dispatched to Fort James on the Gambia River in 1767. In Lloyd's of London, he discovers a merchantman named the Lord Ligonier had sailed from The Gambia on July 5, 1767, bound for Annapolis. The Lord Ligonier had cleared customs in Annapolis on September 29, 1767, and the slaves were advertised for auction in the Maryland Gazette on October 1, 1767. He concludes his research by examining the deed books of Spotsylvania County after September 1767, locating a deed dated September 5, 1768, transferring 240 acres and a slave named Toby from John and Ann Waller to William Waller.

== Characters in Roots ==
- Kunta Kinte – original protagonist: a young man of the Mandinka people, grows up in The Gambia in a small village called Juffure; he was raised as a Muslim before being captured and enslaved. Renamed Toby.
- John Waller – planter, who buys Kunta
- Dr. William Waller – physician and John's brother: buys Kunta from him
- Bell Waller – cook to the doctor and wife of Kunta
- Kizzy Waller (later Kizzy Lea) – daughter of Kunta and Bell
- Missy Anne – Dr. Waller's niece, who lives away from the plantation, but visits her uncle regularly. She befriends Kizzy and teaches her reading and writing by playing "school".
- Tom Lea – slave owner in North Carolina to whom Kizzy is sold
- George Lea – son to Kizzy and Tom Lea, he is called "Chicken George"
- Matilda – George's wife as an adult
- Tom Murray – son of Chicken George and Matilda
- Cynthia – the youngest of Tom's and Irene's eight children (granddaughter of Chicken George)
- Bertha – one of Cynthia's children; the mother of Alex Haley
- Simon Alexander Haley – professor and husband of Bertha; father of Alex Haley
- Alex Haley – author of the book and central character for last 30 pages; the great-great-great-great-grandson of Kunta Kinte.

== Family tree ==
Family of Roots: The Saga of an American Family

Sireng Kinte	Kairaba Kunta Kinte	Yaisa Kinte
Janneh Kinte	Saloum Kinte	Omoro Kinte	Binta Kebba
Kunta Kinte 1767	Bell Waller	Lamin Kinte	Suwadu Kinte	Madi Kinte
Tom Lea	Kizzy Waller 1790
George Lea 1806	Matilda
Virgil	Lily Su	Ashford	George	Tom Murray 1833	Irene	James	Louis	Kizzy	Mary
Uriah	Maria	Ellen	Wini	Matilda	Elizabeth	Tom	Will Palmer	Cynthia 1871
Zeona Hatcher	Simon Alexander Haley (1892–1973)	Bertha George Palmer 1895
Lois Haley	Alex Haley (1921–1992) author	George Haley (1925–2015)	Julius

== Reception ==
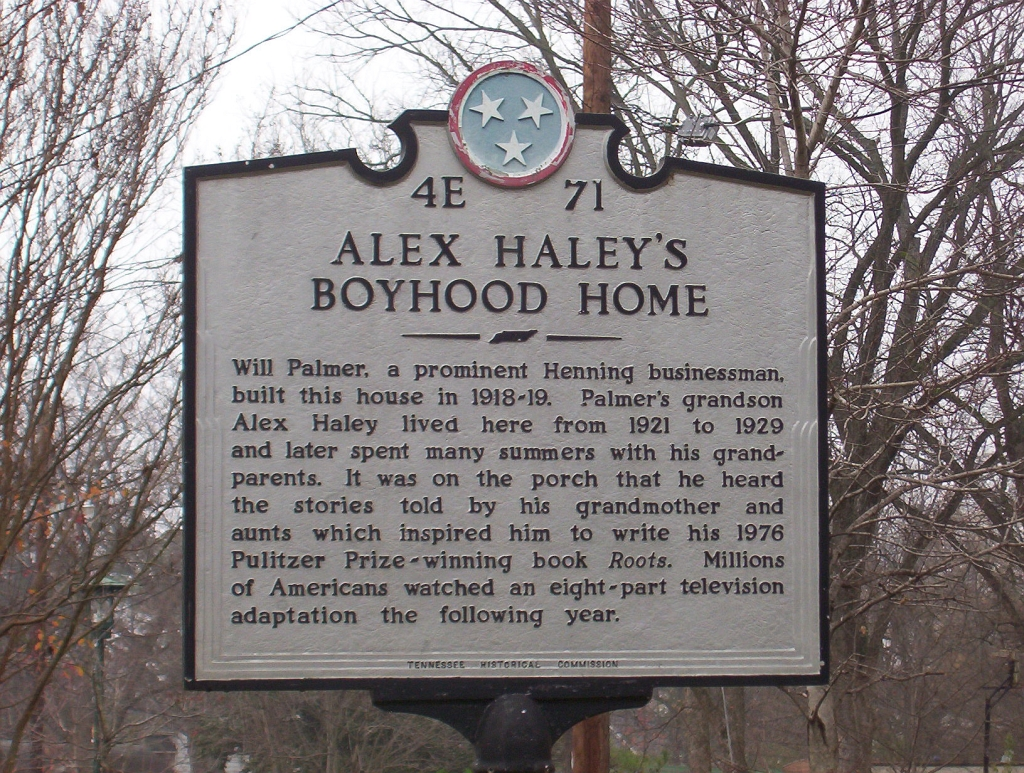
Historical marker in front of Alex Haley's boyhood home in Henning, Tennessee (2007)

Published in October 1976 amid significant advance expectations, Roots was immediately successful, debuting at number five of The New York Times Best Seller list. (The Times classified it as nonfiction.) By mid-November, it rose to number one.

The television adaptation of the book aired in January 1977, which stimulated book sales. Within seven months of its release, Roots had sold more than 15 million hard cover copies.

In total, Roots spent 22 weeks at the number one spot on The Times' list, remaining on the bestseller list for 46 weeks. Together, the success of the novel and its 1977 television adaptation sparked an explosion of interest in the fields of genealogy and researching family histories.

Haley earned a Pulitzer Prize special award in 1977 for Roots. The television miniseries garnered many awards, including nine Emmys and a Peabody.

The book was banned in Knox County, Tennessee public schools in 2026.

== Plagiarism ==
In spring 1977, Haley was sued for plagiarism in separate lawsuits by Harold Courlander and Margaret Walker Alexander. Courlander, an anthropologist, claimed that Roots was copied from his novel The African (1967). Walker claimed Haley had plagiarized her Civil War-era novel Jubilee (1966). Legal proceedings in each case were concluded late in 1978.

Courlander's suit was settled out of court for $650,000 (equivalent to $3.2 million in 2025) and an acknowledgment from Haley that certain passages within Roots were copied from The African.

The court dismissed Walker's case. In comparing the content of Roots with that of Jubilee, it found "no actionable similarities exist between the works".

== Historical accuracy ==
Haley called his novel "faction" and acknowledged that most of the dialogue and incidents were fictional. But, he claimed to have traced his family lineage back to Kunta Kinte, a West African taken from the village of Juffure in what is now The Gambia. Haley also suggested his portrayal of life and figures among the slaves and masters in Virginia and North Carolina were based on facts which he had confirmed through historical documents.

In the concluding chapter of Roots, Alex Haley wrote:

To the best of my knowledge and of my effort, every lineage statement within Roots is from either my African or American families' carefully preserved oral history, much of which I have been able conventionally to corroborate with documents. Those documents, along with the myriad textural details of what were contemporary indigenous lifestyles, cultural history, and such that give Roots flesh have come from years of intensive research in fifty-odd libraries, archives, and other repositories on three continents.

Some historians and genealogists suggested Haley did not rely on factual evidence as closely as he represented. They said that there are serious errors with Haley's family history and historical descriptions of the period preceding the Civil War.

The novel was among the first widely read works of fiction to offer a detailed portrayal of the Middle Passage—the transatlantic journey endured by enslaved Africans. It depicts the physical and psychological trauma of the voyage, including confinement, sensory deprivation, and violence aboard the slave ship. This representation introduced the horrors of the Middle Passage to a broad American audience and contributed to the public's understanding of slavery.

=== Africa ===
In April 1977, The Sunday Times of London published an article titled "Tangled Roots" by Mark Ottaway. It challenged the book's account of Kunta Kinte and Haley's African ancestry. Ottaway found that the only African confirmation of Haley's family history came from Kebba Kanga Fofana, a griot in Juffure. But Fofana was not considered a genuine griot. The head of The Gambian National Archives wrote a letter to Haley expressing doubts about Fofana's reliability. On repeated retellings of the story, Fofana changed key details that Haley had relied on for his identification.

In 1981, Donald R. Wright, a historian of the West African slave trade, reported that elders and griots in The Gambia could not provide detailed information on people living before the mid-19th century, but everyone had heard of Kunta Kinte. Haley had told his story to so many people while visiting The Gambia that his version of his family history had been assimilated into the oral traditions of the country. Haley had created a case of circular reporting, in which people repeated his words back to him.

Roots depicted Juffure as a village where people had heard rumors about white men by 1767, but had never met any. In reality, Juffure was two miles from James Island, a major trading outpost established by the British Royal Africa Company in 1661. The King of Barra allowed the company to establish a fort on the island, on the condition that none of his subjects could be purchased without his permission. Haley admitted that he had picked the year 1767 as "the time the King's soldiers came" in order to match his American research.

=== Virginia and North Carolina ===
Historian Gary B. Mills and genealogist Elizabeth Shown Mills, who specialize in Black American and southern history, followed Haley's trail in census records, deed books, and wills.

They concluded:

Those same plantation records, wills, and censuses cited by Mr. Haley not only fail to document his story, but they contradict each and every pre-Civil War statement of Afro-American lineage in Roots!" (emphasis in the original)

They documented that the Waller family already owned the slave Toby in 1762, five years before the Lord Ligonier ship supposedly landed at Annapolis bearing Kunta Kinte. Haley had searched for references to Toby only after 1767, succumbing to confirmation bias. Dr. Waller had neither a cook named Bell nor his own plantation, as he was disabled and lived with his brother John. Toby appears to have died before 1782, eight years before his daughter Kizzy was supposedly born. "Missy" Anne could not have been Kizzy's childhood playmate, as Ann Murray was a grown woman and already married in the relevant timeframe. The Millses said that there was no record of a Kizzy being owned by any of the Wallers.

After the deed reference to Toby Waller, Haley said that the next piece of documentary evidence he uncovered was the 1870 census listing for Tom Murray's household. The Millses noted that this constituted a gap of more than ninety years of relying only on the Haley family's oral history. They investigated the facts of the oral history but found no corroborating evidence in the historical record.

Tom Lea was not born into a poor family; he came from a well-to-do planter family. The record does not show a Kizzy or her son George among Lea's slaves. There are no records of a mulatto George Lea married to a Matilda. Haley described George Lea as a skilled chicken trainer who was sent to England when Tom Lea ran into financial difficulty in the 1850s. But Tom Lea died during the winter of 1844–45. Further, because the Slavery Abolition Act 1833 abolished slavery within Britain and most of its overseas territories, the Millses noted that it was unlikely that an American slave taken to England in the 1850s, and gaining freedom there, would have agreed to return to the US.

(The case of Somerset v Stewart, (K.B. 1772), held that there was no positive law authorizing slavery in England, and that a slave brought to England from elsewhere was free upon his arrival.)

=== Response ===
Haley initially conceded that he may have been led astray by his African research. He said that he had thought of calling Roots a "historical novel". But, he stated that Ottaway's article was "unwarranted, unfair and unjust", and added that he had no reason to think that Fofana was unreliable.

Haley criticized his detractors' reliance on written records in their evaluations of his work, contending that such records were "sporadic" and frequently inaccurate with regard to such data as slave births and ownership transactions. Haley asserted that for Black genealogy, "well-kept oral history is without question the best source".

The Millses discovered a better fit to the oral history in the written record than Haley himself had found. Dr. William Waller's father was Colonel William Waller, who owned a slave named Hopping George, a description consistent with a foot injury. Colonel Waller also owned a slave named Isbell, who may be the Bell in Haley family legend. Tom Lea's father lived in Spotsylvania County, Virginia, and he may have purchased some of Haley's ancestors from the Wallers. When the Lea family moved to North Carolina, they presumably took their slaves with them. The Leas lived in close proximity to the Murrays and Holts. The Millses documented three women named Kizzie associated with the Lea and Murray families in the post-Civil War records.

Historian Henry Louis Gates Jr. was a friend of Haley's. Years after Haley's death, Gates acknowledged his own doubts about the author's claims:

Most of us feel it's highly unlikely that Alex found the village whence his ancestors sprang. Roots is a work of the imagination rather than strict historical scholarship. It was an important event because it captured everyone's imagination.

Gates later hosted the TV series African American Lives and Finding Your Roots. His researchers have used DNA testing and a wide range of records in efforts to corroborate family histories and genealogies.

Haley wrote another novel, about his paternal grandmother Queen [Jackson] Haley, but died before he could finish it. It was published posthumously as Queen: The Story of an American Family.

Subsequent DNA testing of Alex Haley's nephew Chris Haley revealed that Alec Haley, Alex's paternal grandfather and Queen Haley's husband, was most likely descended from Scottish ancestors via William Harwell Baugh, an overseer of an Alabama slave plantation.

== Related scholarship ==
- Gerber, David A. "Haley's Roots and Our Own: An Inquiry Into the Nature of a Popular Phenomenon", Journal of Ethnic Studies 5.3 (Fall 1977): 87–111.
- Hudson, Michelle. "The Effect of 'Roots' and the Bicentennial on Genealogical Interest among Patrons of the Mississippi Department of Archives and History," Journal of Mississippi History 1991 53(4): 321–336
- Mills, Gary B. and Elizabeth Shown Mills. "Roots and the New 'Faction': A Legitimate Tool for CLIO?", Virginia Magazine of History and Biography, 89 (January 1981): 3–26. PDF at Historic Pathways .
- Ryan, Tim A. Calls and Responses: The American Novel of Slavery since Gone with the Wind. Baton Rouge: Louisiana State UP, 2008.
- Skaggs, Merrill Maguire. "Roots: A New Black Myth", Southern Quarterly 17. 1 (Fall 1978): 42–50.
- Taylor, Helen. "'The Griot from Tennessee': The Saga of Alex Haley's Roots", Critical Quarterly 37.2 (Summer 1995): 46–62.
- Wright, Donald R. "Uprooting Kunta Kinte: On the Perils of Relying on Encyclopedic Informants," History of Africa 8 (1981): 205–217.
- Binczycka-Gacek, E. "Multisensory Experience of the Middle Passage in Alex Haley’s Roots." Cultural Heritage and Mobility from a Multisensory Perspective, edited by Banaszkiewicz M. and Nikielska-Sekuła K, Routledge, 2025, pp. 61–73.
- Osagie, I. "Routed Passages: Narrative Memory and Identity in Alex Haley's Roots." CLA Journal 47, no. 4 (June 2004): 391–408.

== Television and audio adaptations ==
Roots was a television miniseries airing over eight consecutive nights in January 1977. ABC network television executives chose to "dump" the series into a string of airings rather than space out the broadcasts because they were uncertain how the public would respond to the controversial, racially charged themes of the show. Approximately 130 million Americans tuned in at some time during the eight broadcasts. The concluding episode on January 30, 1977, has been ranked as the third most watched telecast of all time by the Nielsen corporation.

The cast of the miniseries included LeVar Burton as Kunta Kinte, Leslie Uggams as Kizzy, and Ben Vereen as Chicken George. A fourteen-hour sequel, Roots: The Next Generations, aired in 1979, featuring the leading black actors of the day.

In December 1988, ABC aired a two-hour made-for-TV movie: Roots: The Gift. Based on characters from the book, it starred LeVar Burton as Kunta Kinte, Avery Brooks as Cletus Moyer, Kate Mulgrew as Hattie Carraway, and Tim Russ as house slave Marcellus (all four actors later became prominent as leading actors in the Star Trek franchise).

In May 2007, BBC America released Roots as an audiobook narrated by Avery Brooks. The release coincided with Vanguard Press's publication of a new paperback edition of the book, which had gone out of print in 2004, and with Warner Home Video's release of a 30th-anniversary DVD-boxed set of the miniseries.

A Blu-ray edition of the original miniseries debuted on May 30, 2016, to coordinate with the release of the remake of the television series.

In November 2013, the History channel announced it was developing an eight-hour Roots miniseries with Mark Wolper, son of the original show's original producer David L. Wolper. This version aired May 30, 2016, and combined elements from both Haley's book and its 1977 adaptation. Directors include Mario Van Peebles, Thomas Carter and Phillip Noyce, executive producers include Will Packer and LeVar Burton, while cast members include Malachi Kirby as Kunte, Forest Whitaker, Anna Paquin, Laurence Fishburne, Mekhi Phifer, Jonathan Rhys Meyers, Derek Luke, Anika Noni Rose, and Chad L. Coleman.

== Publication details ==
- 1976, US, Doubleday Books (ISBN 0-385-03787-2), Pub date 12 September 1976, hardback (First edition)
- 1977, UK, Hutchinson (ISBN 0-09-129680-3), Pub date ? April 1977, hardback
- 1978, UK, Picador (ISBN 0-330-25301-8), Pub date 14 April 1978, paperback
- 1980, US, Bantam Books (ISBN 0-685-01405-3), Pub date ? November 1980, paperback (Teacher's guide)
- 1982, UK, GK Hall (ISBN 0-8161-6639-0), Pub date ? December 1982, hardback
- 1985, US, Vintage (ISBN 0-09-952200-4), Pub date ? May 1985, paperback
- 1992, US, Bantam Doubleday Dell (ISBN 0-440-17464-3), Pub date 31 December 1992, paperback
- 1994, US, Vintage (ISBN 0-09-936281-3), Pub date 21 January 1994, paperback
- 1999, US, Rebound by Sagebrush (ISBN 0-8085-1103-3), Pub date ? October 1999, hardback (Library edition)
- 2000, US, Wings (ISBN 0-517-20860-1), Pub date ? September 2000, hardback
- 2006, US, Buccaneer Books (ISBN 1-56849-471-8), Pub date 30 August 2006, hardback
- 2007, US, Vanguard Press (ISBN 1593154496), Pub date 22 May 2007, paperback

== Legacy and honors ==
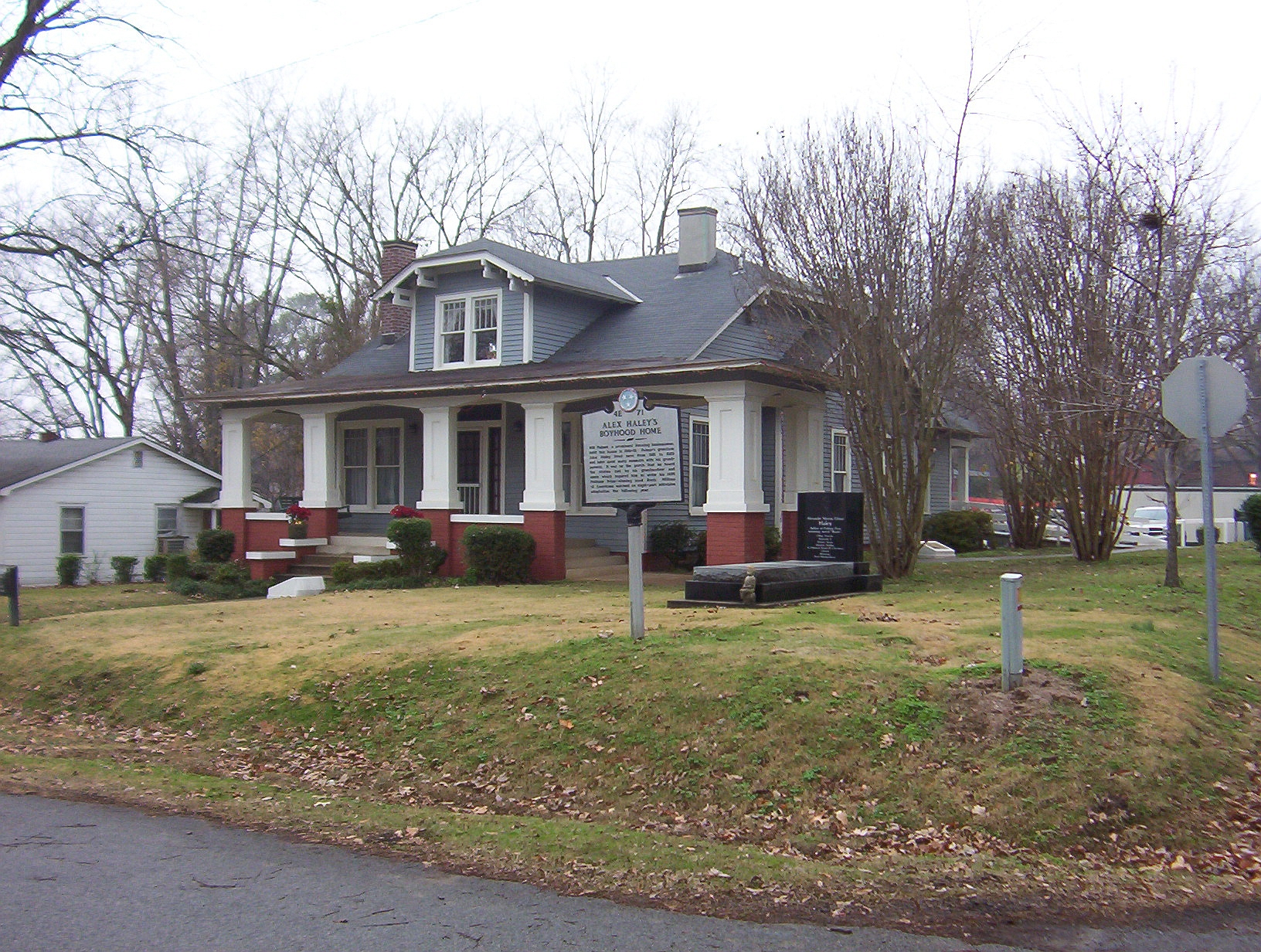
Alex Haley's boyhood home. His grave is beside the house.

- Haley received a Pulitzer Prize for his book, and the TV series won several major awards.
- Including weeks on The New York Times bestseller list, the book is considered a publishing and cultural sensation.
- An official Tennessee historical marker in Henning marks the site of Haley's house and grave, describing the impact of Roots.
- Sinéad O'Connor's 1988 hit "Mandinka" was inspired by Alex Haley's book.

== See also ==
- African American literature
- Queen: The Story of an American Family, 1993 novel
- Slavery in the United States
- Treatment of slaves in the United States
