= Lord Ligonier (slave ship) =

Late 18th century British ship

History

Great Britain
- Name: Lord Ligonier
- Namesake: John Ligonier, 1st Earl Ligonier
- Owner: 1765, James Debatt, Daniel Vialars
- Operator: Thomas Davies
- Port of registry: London, England
- Route: Annapolis, Maryland to London, England to The Gambia
- Builder: Built in New England
- Laid down: 1763
- Launched: 1765
- Completed: July 1765
- Acquired: c. 1765
- Fate: Unknown

General characteristics
- Class & type: Slave ship
- Tons burthen: 130 (bm)
- Decks: 6
- Sail plan: Ship rig
- Capacity: 210 people
- Crew: 40
- Armament: 6 guns

Lord Ligonier was an 18th-century British slave ship built in New England that unloaded enslaved Africans in Annapolis, Maryland in 1767. The ship was made famous by Alex Haley's novel, Roots: The Saga of an American Family, in which it brought his ancestor, Kunta Kinte, from The Gambia to the colonial United States.

== Construction ==
Lord Ligonier was originally laid down in 1763. The ship was built for hauling tobacco, spice, lumber, and slaves. In June 1765, the ship's owner, Horace Andrews, hired a crew of 40 men and a captain named Davies.

The ship had six decks in all, four for carrying "human cargo" and two for hauling spice, lumber, and tobacco. Lord Ligonier was a sailing ship built to weather Atlantic storms. It could carry 170 enslaved Africans, 40 crew members, and various amounts of other cargo. Although it could carry 170 enslaved people if they were packed in sideways, the ship's capacity was reduced to 140 when they lay on their backs.

== 1766 voyage and Roots ==
Lord Ligonier visited the Gambia at least once before the slave trading voyage for which she would much later become famous. In April 1766 she was reported to have returned from there with dispatches from Governor Debatt of Fort James reporting that the French were establishing armed factories on the coast in violation of their treaty undertakings.

Captain Thomas Davis sailed from London on 17 July 1766 and arrived in Africa on 13 September. The Lord Ligonier acquired her slaves at the Gambia and sailed from Africa on 5 July 1767. She arrived at Annapolis on 29 September. She had embarked with 140 slaves, and she arrived with 96. She had left London with 26 crew members, and she arrived with 18. She arrived back in London on 25 January 1768.

A surviving advertisement records the arrival of the ship with a cargo of slaves at Annapolis in 1767. The ship was the basis for Alex Haley's assertion in his novel, Roots: The Saga of an American Family, that his ancestor, Kunta Kinte, was brought on that voyage. The miniseries based on the book invented a failed slave uprising during the voyage.

This is the only voyage of the Lord Ligonier recorded in the Trans Atlantic Slave Trade Database.

== Fate ==
Lord Ligonier's subsequent fate is unknown. There is proof that it sailed on another slave voyage, but nothing is known of it. The ship did not appear in the 1776 volume of Lloyd's Register.

== See also ==
- Atlantic slave trade
