= The Sum of Us =

The Sum of Us can refer to:

- The Sum of Us: What Racism Costs Everyone and How We Can Prosper Together, a 2021 best-selling political book by Heather McGhee.
- The Sum of Us (play), a 1990 play by Australian writer and director David Stevens.
- The Sum of Us (film), a 1994 Australian comedy-drama film version of the 1990 play The Sum of Us written by David Stevens.
- The Sum of Us, the 2001 album of The Idea of North, an Australian a cappella vocal ensemble.

== See also ==
- SumOfUs, a global non-profit advocacy organization and online community.
