= Roots: The Next Generations =

1979 American TV miniseries

- Created by: Alex Haley
- Based on: Roots: The Saga of an American Family by Alex Haley
- Screenplay by: Ernest Kinoy
- Directed by: John Erman (eps. 1, 3, 4, 7); Charles S. Dubin (ep. 2); Georg Stanford Brown (ep. 5); Lloyd Richards (ep. 6)
- Starring: James Earl Jones; Dorian Harewood; Irene Cara; Stan Shaw; Georg Stanford Brown; Debbi Morgan
- Theme music composer: Gerald Fried
- Country of origin: United States
- Original language: English/Mandinka
- No. of episodes: 7

Production
- Executive producer: David L. Wolper
- Producer: Stan Margulies
- Running time: 840 minutes
- Production companies: David L. Wolper Productions; Warner Bros. Television
- Budget: US$16.6 million

Original release
- Network: ABC
- Release: February 18 – February 24, 1979

Roots: The Next Generations is an American television miniseries based on the last seven chapters of Alex Haley's 1976 novel Roots: The Saga of an American Family. First aired on ABC in February 1979, it is a sequel to the 1977 Roots miniseries, tracing the lives of Kunta Kinte's descendants in Henning, Tennessee, from 1882 to 1967.

Roots: The Next Generations was produced with a budget of $16.6 million, nearly three times larger than that of the original. The screenplay was written by Ernest Kinoy.

== Plot ==
For the first part of the story, see Roots.

=== Chapter 1 – 1880s ===
The story resumes in 1882, twelve years after the arrival of "Chicken George" Moore and his family in Henning in West Tennessee. George, elderly and showing his age, moves in with Tom Harvey, one of his sons, along with Tom’s wife, Irene, and their two daughters, Elizabeth and Cynthia. Tom, a great-grandson of Kunta Kinte, has become a leader of the Black community in Henning. Although he has established a working relationship with the town's white leader, Col. Frederick Warner, a former officer in the Confederate Army, race relations are strained, due in part to the new Jim Crow laws and similar influences.

Col. Warner's younger son, Jim, meets Carrie Barden, a young African American schoolteacher and a graduate of Fisk University, a Black school in Nashville (the capital of the state in Middle Tennessee). Tom has taken the lead in hiring Carrie for the local school for the Black children. Col. Warner disapproves of the relationship between Jim and Carrie, so he seeks to persuade Tom to fire Carrie or to close the school.

After an argument between Tom and his older daughter, Elizabeth, about his refusal to accept her suitor, John Dolan, because he is half white (although Irene reminds Tom that his father Chicken George is also half white, and Tom himself is a quarter white), Tom decides to allow Carrie to continue teaching. Jim and Carrie marry in Memphis. Col. Warner disinherits Jim, but he says that he will ensure that no harm comes to the couple from the hoodlum white element of the town. Jim, with his new bride, receives a warm welcome to the local Black church.

A year later in 1883, Chicken George dies at age 83 (note in Roots, George is said to have been born in 1806, which would make him 77), and the family bury his body beside that of his wife, Mathilda "Tildy", who died in 1875 at age 76.

=== Chapter 2 – Turn of the 20th Century ===
Thirteen years later, in August 1896, Elizabeth, Tom's older daughter, arrives from Kansas City, Missouri, for an extended visit, amid tension between Tom and Elizabeth, due to Tom's rejection of her suitor years before. Cynthia "Cinthy", Tom's younger daughter, meets Will Palmer, a hard-working young man. After a properly supervised courtship, the couple marry in their church.

Andrew Warner, an unemployed playboy and the older son of Col. Warner, becomes interested in politics, and he eventually opposes his father in the public arena.

While Will works for Bob Campbell at his lumberyard, he does so in such an enthusiastic, industrious and effective way that he attracts the attention of both Col. Warner and T.J. Calloway, the local banker. Because of Campbell's increasing problems with alcohol and his decreasing attention to his business, and after Campbell's default on his loan from the bank, Calloway forecloses, takes over the lumberyard, sells it to Will and finances his purchase. Thus, the R. Campbell Lumber Company becomes the W.E. Palmer Lumber Company.

By this time, Jim and Carrie already have a son, named Frank "Frankie", and they live peacefully and happily in the Black community of Henning. However, in the atmosphere of the growing anti-Black attitudes in the South during the 1890s, racial tension increases in Henning too, as several incidents demonstrate. Tom is turned away when he again applies to register to vote, and he forcefully insists that every time since the Civil War, he has voted without interference, in both Alamance County, North Carolina, and in Lauderdale County, Tennessee.

Will and Cinthy rejoice over the birth of their daughter, Bertha George, named in part in honor of Chicken George, one of her great-grandfathers.

=== Chapter 3 – World War I ===
By September 1914, after 17 more years, telephones, electricity and automobiles have arrived in Henning, both the town and Will Palmer's lumber company have grown, both Tom and Irene Harvey have died, as has Mrs. Warner, and Andrew Warner, the colonel's older son, now serves as a member of the US House of Representatives.

Dr. Frank Warner, the son of Jim and Carrie Warner, has completed undergraduate college, medical school, an internship and a residency, and he's about to start his medical practice. Cinthy calls him "the first colored doctor in the county".

Will and Cynthia send their daughter Bertha to Lane College, a Black school in Jackson, Tennessee.

Col. Warner, frail and confused, collapses on a street while Jim, Carrie and Frank are present nearby. They rush to him and Frank starts to treat him. However, Earl Crowther, the Warner chauffeur, and a gang of rednecks take charge, ignore both Jim and Frank and nudge them aside, and insult Frank, who predicts that the colonel will die before they get him to the white physician. He does indeed die.

At the college, Bertha meets and soon falls in love with Simon Alexander Haley, a waiter in the dining room and a son of a sharecropper, who lives and works near Savannah, in Hardin County, Tennessee, about 116 miles due east of Memphis. Simon, who greatly admires Booker T. Washington, quotes to Bertha from his writings, including these words: "The wisest among my race understand that the agitation of questions of social equality is the extremest folly, and that progress in the enjoyment of all the privileges to come to us must be the result of severe and constant struggle rather than artificial forcing." Referring to Washington, Simon says, "I have formed my life in his image."

The Ku Klux Klan resurges in Henning. They burn a cross, hold a parade and burn down the clothing store of a Jewish merchant, Mr. Goldstein, who has moved to Henning from Chicago, Illinois, and who returns there.

Simon leaves Lane College, and he has made plans to continue his education at the Agricultural and Technical (A&T) College of North Carolina (later renamed North Carolina Agricultural and Technical (A&T) State University), in Greensboro, North Carolina. He has applied to enroll in the school and has arranged to work on the campus to pay for his room and board.

His father, Alec Haley, has promised to give him $50 to pay for his tuition, but now he tells him that he cannot keep his promise because of the recent poor crops due to floods and boll weevils. To avoid becoming an indebted sharecropper himself, Simon works the summer as a railway porter for the Pullman Company. He works with an older porter, Dad Jones, who becomes his fatherly friend and—in one instance with another porter—his protector.

During one trip, Simon meets and talks with a kindly and wealthy passenger, R.S.M. Boyce, an executive of the Curtis Publishing Company, the publisher of The Saturday Evening Post and several other well-known magazines. They discuss Simon's plans and difficulties. When Boyce steps off the train, he hands to Simon a generous tip and one of his business cards, inviting him to inform him of his progress. When Simon leaves his position to return to school, he learns that Dad was fired for discussing unionization of the porters with a labor spy. When Simon arrives at the college, he learns that Boyce has already paid for the coming year in full for his textbooks, tuition, and room and board.

Simon and Bertha continue to keep in touch with each other, and Bertha and her parents, Will and Cynthia, travel to Simon's graduation, where he will receive his bachelor's degree in agriculture. When the family arrives at the campus, Bertha receives a message that Simon and six of his classmates have just left and enlisted in the US Army for service in the World War. The young couple see each other briefly when Simon and his all-Black platoon of recruits board a train to go to the next stage in his life.

During May 1918, Simon receives his basic training in an all-Black company at Camp Grant, Illinois, near Rockford, about 85 miles west-northwest of Chicago, then he, in an all-Black outfit, goes to France and takes part in the fighting against the German Army of Kaiser Wilhelm II.

Before Simon goes overseas, Bertha meets Simon in Chicago for a weekend (after Elizabeth pleads Bertha's case with Will, who first has vigorously opposed such a trip but eventually allows it). While Simon is in the Army in France, Cousin Georgia Anderson, from Kansas City, visits Will and Cinthy, and she reveals that Chicken George fought with the Union Army during the Battle of Fort Pillow, due west of Henning, on the Chickasaw Bluff, overlooking the Mississippi River. (That point implies that he survived the infamous Massacre of Fort Pillow.)

In July 1918, Simon receives word in France that his father has died in a hospital in Memphis; in due time, after the end of the war, Simon returns to the United States.

Andy Warner raises his political sights even higher, and he becomes elected to the US Senate.

After the Army discharges Simon, on his way back home to Henning, he and his army associates stop at the home of one of them in Knoxville, in East Tennessee. While they are there, the Knoxville Riot of 1919 (a part of the Red Summer of 1919) takes place. Earl Crowther, now an aide to Sen. Andrew Warner, goes to Knoxville to take part in the mischief, and he dies there (at the hands of one of Simon's Army associates).

Simon arrives in Henning and receives a robust welcome, especially from Bertha, and the young couple move ahead with the plans for their wedding. Will builds an attractive bungalow for Bertha and Simon, assuming that they will settle in Henning, but without asking about their own plans.

On the first Sunday after the completion of the house, the wedding takes place in their church, then everyone adjourns to the front lawn of the new home for the reception, and a number of white neighbors join them. Among them are Sen. Andy Warner and his fancy new wife, from Washington, DC, and New York City, who arrive in a Rolls-Royce open touring car with a chauffeur.

Afterward, Mr. and Mrs. Simon Haley motor away in a Ford Model T to Cornell University, in Ithaca, New York, where Simon will start working on his master's degree in agriculture.

Later, Will and Cinthy move into the bungalow. (The house still stands; it is now known as the Alex Haley House and Museum and, as a state-owned historic site, is open to the public.)

In November 1921, Simon and Bertha return to Henning to visit Will and Cinthy, and they surprise them with their three-month-old son, Alexander Murray Palmer Haley, who Will promptly carries outside, lifts up and ceremonially shows the Moon, in a tradition that was first portrayed in the first Roots series by Omoro Kinte and baby Kunta Kinte in The Gambia in West Africa in 1750 (although, in the first Roots, the tradition was a naming ritual, in which the father held the naked child to the stars, gave the child a name and said, "Behold the only thing greater than yourself.").

=== Chapter 4 – The Great Depression ===
After eleven more years, late in the summer of 1932, during the Great Depression, Simon, Bertha and their children stay temporarily in the bungalow with Will and Cynthia. At age 10, Alex has two younger brothers: George, named for Chicken George, and Julius. While working at Will's lumberyard, Simon unsuccessfully tries to show Will better methods for bookkeeping and inventory control, but Will disregards and uses him as a manual laborer.

Shortly, however, Simon receives a special-delivery letter offering him a job as a professor of agriculture at the State Agricultural and Mechanical (A&M) Institute for Negroes, in Normal, Alabama. (The school later becomes renamed as the Alabama Agricultural and Mechanical (A&M) University; the campus and the former town of Normal, named for the normal school established there, now lie within the city limits of Huntsville.) Simon promptly and joyfully accepts his appointment, and he and his family move to Normal in their Chevrolet four-door sedan.

Not only does Professor Haley teach his students in the classrooms and laboratories, but he also approaches the local farmers and, with little success, tells them about techniques that would enable them to replenish the soil and to produce better crops, using simple techniques, such as crop rotation. He meets Lyle Pettijohn, the county agricultural agent and a son of a sharecropper in Greene County, Tennessee, so the two of them easily find mutual interests and objectives. However, both Simon and Lyle meet resistance and incite violent reprisals by the white landowners.

Soon afterward, Will dies in Henning. While Bertha is out of town with the two younger sons for the funeral, Simon and Alex spend some special time together, during which Simon says to him, "There's one thing poor people have in common no matter who they are, they have no education. Education is the key; it's the way up, the way out. That's why you must do well in school Alex, not only for yourself but to help others as well." When Simon and his family return to Normal, they find that his antagonists have broken in, damaged their home and destroyed much of their property.

In May 1933, Bertha starts to show subtle signs of a threatening illness, and those symptoms continue during a summer vacation in Henning with the aging Cynthia. One afternoon, Simon returns to his home and learns that Bertha has experienced a relapse in her illness, and that her condition has become serious. Minutes later, because of internal bleeding due to an undisclosed problem, Bertha dies in Simon's arms while Alex watches.

Simon drives his three sons to Henning, where the boys move into the bungalow with Cynthia and Elizabeth. On the front porch of the bungalow, Alex listens to Cynthia, Elizabeth and sometimes Cousin Georgia while they retell the stories about Kunta Kinte, Kizzy, Chicken George, Tom and the others.

Shortly afterward, Grandma Cinthy shows Alex a large cross-section disc cut from the trunk of a redwood tree in California, and she explains it to him. Will has marked the annual rings of the trunk in such a way as to indicate the years when various relatives had been born, and when several major world events had occurred.

=== Chapter 5 – World War II ===
Seven years later, on May 1, 1939, at age 17, Alex arrives in Elizabeth City, North Carolina, where Simon now lives with Zeona, his second wife, and where he now teaches agriculture at the Elizabeth City State Teachers College (a Black school, later renamed as the Elizabeth City State University). Alex promptly sees that Zeona is pregnant. His academic work has become so lackluster and mediocre that he has dropped out of the Alcorn Agricultural and Mechanical (A&M) College (another Black school, later renamed as the Alcorn State University) near Lorman, Mississippi. Simon strongly encourages Alex to enlist in one of the branches of the armed forces, in the expectation that two or three years of military life will help raise Alex's maturity level.

In August 1939, Alex enlists in the US Coast Guard in Portsmouth, Virginia, and he reports directly aboard a cutter, USCGC Mendota (WHEC-69), without receiving the benefit of any boot camp or other basic training. However, Percival "Scotty" Scott, a gruff but kindly Steward's Mate First-Class, the leading Petty Officer in the wardroom area among the Mess Attendants and Steward's Mates, takes Alex in tow. Alex begins as a Mess Attendant, starting on the career path toward his becoming a Steward's Mate, one of the few ratings available to Black enlisted men in either the Navy or the Coast Guard during the era of World War II. (The real USCGC Mendota (WHEC-69) served 1945-1973.)

While attending a church-sponsored dance for servicemen and local ladies, Alex meets Nan Branch, a naïve, single young woman, and they continue to meet at the church dances. On the eighth such meeting, Alex proposes marriage to Nan, and she accepts. They soon marry, then they visit Simon, Zeona and their new baby, in Elizabeth City. Simon expresses disapproval because Alex has departed from his plan for him, and Zeona urges Simon to stop interfering.

Meanwhile, on December 7, 1941, the Empire of Japan attacks the USA at Pearl Harbor in the Territory of Hawaii, thus drawing the United States into the war. By this time, Scotty has advanced to the rate of Chief Petty Officer (Chief Steward's Mate).

By July 1942, Alex and Chief Scott are somewhere in the South Pacific Ocean aboard USS Murzim (AK-95), an ammunition ship, one of several Naval vessels crewed by the Coast Guard during World War II. Scotty asks Alex why he receives so many letters, and he answers that, in effect, if he wishes to receive letters, then he must write letters – to relatives back home. Then, at Scotty's request, Alex writes a love letter for Scotty to a girlfriend in Auckland, New Zealand, where the ship will make a port visit about two months later. The letter works so well that Scotty sets up Alex to write love letters for other shipmates for one dollar apiece. Thus, Alex enters the writing business. (The real USS Murzim (AK-95) served 1943-1946.)

While at sea, Alex receives the news that Nan has given birth to a girl, and that she has given her mother's name, Lydia, to their baby. Alex expresses his pleasure about his new fatherhood, yet he says that he had wanted to give the girl the name of Cynthia, his maternal grandmother.

World War II ends, and both Simon and Alex start thinking about their respective plans for Alex. Simon makes a train journey to California, where he meets Alex at the Coast Guard Station on Yerba Buena Island, in the San Francisco Bay. Alex has advanced to the rate of Petty Officer First-Class (Steward's Mate First-Class). Simon and Alex articulate a sharp disagreement about the differences between their plans for Alex; Simon wants him to return to academia, but Alex intends to stay in the Coast Guard at least until he decides or discovers what else he should do. Simon expresses a dream that Alex might even become a president of a university.

Alex returns to the East Coast and to Nan and Lydia, and Nan again becomes pregnant. Alex requests and gets an assignment in New York City so that he can live and work closer to the editors there because of his intense interest in writing and his goal to become a published author.

=== Chapter 6 – Postwar ===
In November 1946, Alex and his family head northward to his next duty station, and they encounter not only racial discrimination but also frustration and disappointment while seeking a room in a motel or "auto court". Alex starts working, writing press releases in the public-relations office of the Coast Guard in Manhattan. While off-duty, he starts writing proposed articles and submitting them to magazines, but he receives only rejection slips.

Cdr. Robert Munroe, the officer in charge of the public-relations office, a Southerner with 30 years of experience in journalism, dismisses Alex's early writings as amateurish but takes an interest in Alex, his work and his plans, and he offers him constructive advice and guidance. Alex works hard on his writing, both on-duty and off-duty. He spends so much time on his own writing that Nan begins to complain, saying that he neglects her and their two children, Lydia and Billy, by giving them so little time and attention.

While on annual leave from the Coast Guard, Alex and his family visit Cynthia, Elizabeth and Cousin Georgia in the bungalow in Henning, and, partly with the encouragement of Grandma Cinthy, he starts to feel a need or wish to learn more about the roots of his family. During that visit, Cinthy tells Alex that the old slice from the redwood tree has become hauled away to a dump because insects had begun reducing it to sawdust.

Alex continues to feel much frustration and disappointment about his lack of success in civilian commercial writing. He seeks and, in 1949, receives a change of his rating from Steward's Mate First-Class to Journalist First-Class, and he remains as a journalist (no longer in the wardroom area). Later, he advances to the rate of Chief Petty Officer (Chief Journalist; the first Chief Journalist in the Coast Guard), and he continues as a Chief Journalist for the remainder of his 20-year military career.

On Christmas Eve 1950, Mel Klein, an independent writer on an assignment from a magazine editor, consults Alex to get some statistics to go into a new article about the Coast Guard, and Alex asks Mel for advice. Mel tells him about Coronet, a small-format magazine, which, according to Mel, can't get enough short (600-word) human-interest stories.

In response to Mel's advice, Alex, that same night, dives into his work after hours in the office and submerges himself in his writing and rewriting – to the extent that he loses sight of his special duties to his family that special night – to take home the gifts and the tree, for which Nan and the kids have prepared a place in their apartment, and for which they have awaited and anticipated. On Christmas Day, Alex finally arrives at their apartment – barely in time to see Nan and their children as they walk out and step into a taxicab – because Nan has decided to leave Alex and to move in with her mother in her home. Nan and Alex later divorce.

=== Chapter 7 – The 1960s ===
In October 1960, Simon, Alex, George and others gather in Henning for the funeral of Aunt Lizzie. George is an attorney and a state senator (and the second Black graduate of the School of Law at the University of Arkansas), Julius is an architect, and Alex is, as he describes himself, a professional writer with a respectable living. Simon implies that he does not feel as pleased with the accomplishments of Alex as he does with those of his two younger brothers.

In 1960, Alex meets Malcolm X, and later interviews him and a number of other notable people, including George Lincoln Rockwell, while writing for Playboy and the Reader's Digest. Alex also co-authors The Autobiography of Malcolm X, and he finishes it several weeks before the assassination of the subject person.

While Alex makes another visit in Henning, Cousin Georgia encourages him and his curiosity about his family heritage. Alex continues his research – to the National Archives, a private source in North Carolina, a historical society in Annapolis, the headquarters of the United Nations, and eventually to the village of Jufureh in The Gambia in West Africa. Before Alex leaves for West Africa, Simon reconciles with his son, saying that he is proud of Alex's work on The Autobiography of Malcolm X.

In Jufureh, Alex listens to a native griot who tells about a young Mandinka man, Kunta Kinte, who went out to fetch wood to make a drum and was never again seen. Thus, Alex concludes that he has truly discovered his ancestor and his history in Africa.

=== Epilogue ===
As with the original, the new series again concludes with a postscript by Alex himself, who encourages viewers to explore their own genealogy, in part by interviewing their older relatives, consulting written records and holding family reunions.

For the first part of the story, see Roots.

== Cast ==
Number in parentheses indicates how many episodes in which the actor/character appears.

- Georg Stanford Brown – Tom Harvey (2)
- Lynne Moody – Irene Harvey (2)
- Debbi Morgan – Elizabeth Harvey (6)
- Beah Richards – Cynthia Harvey Palmer (older) (2)
- Henry Fonda – Colonel Frederick Warner (3)
- Olivia de Havilland – Mrs. Warner (2)
- Richard Thomas – Jim Warner (3)
- Marc Singer – Andy Warner (4)
- Stan Shaw – Will Palmer (4)
- Fay Hauser – Carrie Barden (4)
- Irene Cara – Bertha Palmer Haley (3)
- Avon Long – Chicken George Moore (1)
- Roger E. Mosley – Lee Garnet (1)
- Paul Koslo – Earl Crowther (4)
- Harry Morgan – Bob Campbell (1)
- Dorian Harewood – Simon Haley (5)
- Ruby Dee – Queen Haley (3)
- Hal Williams – Alec Haley (1)
- Greg Morris – Beeman Jones (1)
- Brian Stokes Mitchell – John Dolan (1)
- Ja'net Dubois – Sally Harvey (1)
- Slim Gaillard – Sam Wesley (1)
- George Voskovec – Mr. Goldstein (1)
- Jason Wingreen – Judge Quartermain (1)
- Charlie Robinson – Luke Bettiger (1)
- Ossie Davis – Dad Jones (1)
- Kene Holliday – Detroit (1)
- Albert Popwell – Fader (1)
- John Rubinstein – Lieutenant Hamilton Ten Eyck (1)
- Bernie Casey – Bubba Haywood (1)
- Pam Grier – Francey (1)
- Roosevelt Grier – Big Slew Johnson (1)
- James Daly – R.S.M. Boyce (1)
- Percy Rodriguez – Boyd Moffatt (1)
- Robert Culp – Lyle Pettijohn (1)
- Dina Merrill – Mrs. Hickinger (1)
- Brock Peters – Ab Dekker (1)
- Bever-Leigh Banfield – Cynthia Palmer (young adult) (3)
- Paul Winfield – Dr. Horace Huguley (1)
- Lynn Hamilton – Cousin Georgia Anderson (3)
- Kristoff St. John – Alex Haley (child) (1)
- Logan Ramsey – F.R. Lewis (1)
- Dennis Fimple – Sheriff Duffy (1)
- Damon Evans – Alex Haley (ages 16–28) (1)
- Debbie Allen – Nan Branch Haley (1)
- Andy Griffith – Commander Robert Munroe (1)
- Diahann Carroll – Zeona Haley (1)
- Rafer Johnson – Nelson (1)
- Carmen McRae – Lily (1)
- John Hancock – Scotty (1)
- Telma Hopkins – Daisy (1)
- Kim Fields – Lydia Haley (1)
- Milt Kogan – Mel Klein (1)
- James Earl Jones – Alex Haley (ages 39–46) (1)
- Howard Rollins – George Haley (1)
- Marlon Brando – George Lincoln Rockwell (1)
- Al Freeman Jr. – Malcolm X (1)
- Barbara Barrie – Dodie Brattle (1)
- Linda Hopkins – Singer (1)
- Bobby Short – Himself (1)
- Lee Chamberlin – Odile Richards (1)
- Norman Fell – Paul Reynolds (1)
- James Broderick – Dr. Lewis (1)
- Michael Constantine – Dr. Vansina (1)
- Johnny Sekka – Ebau (1)
- Zakes Mokae – African Minister (1)
- Claudia McNeil – Sister Will Ada (1)
- Bianca Ferguson – Sophia (1)
- Philip Michael Thomas – Eddie Franklin (1)

== Production ==
Producers Stan Margulies and David L. Wolper were initially reluctant to make a sequel to the 1977 miniseries but later agreed to do it. Writer Ernest Kinoy then wrote an outline for Roots: The Next Generations, based on the final seven chapters of Alex Haley's book Roots: The Saga of an American Family and about 1,000 pages worth of family recollections that Alex Haley dictated into a tape recorder.

While Haley contributed as a consultant during the production, many of the family and other events depicted were factually inaccurate or wholly fictionalized. Some glaring examples include:

1. Jim Warner and Carrie Barden were in reality James Turner and Carrie White. James was not the son of a prominent Colonel who lived in Henning and did not have a brother who eventually became a Tennessee senator. The miniseries opens in 1883. Jim and Carrie are introduced as strangers and later get married by running off to Memphis. In reality, Jim and Carrie were married in Lauderdale County, Tennessee, on April 21, 1876, seven years prior to the year the miniseries begins. It is also unlikely that Jim was white since, in 1876, interracial marriages were illegal. Lauderdale County officials would have refused to issue a marriage license to any interracial couple seeking to marry. Jim was likely a mulatto. In fact, according to the 1891 Tennessee voter registration rolls, Jim was identified as Black. The best evidence showing that Jim was not white is an affidavit found in his 1942 probate file in Lauderdale County signed by his widow, Carrie. In paragraph 2 of the affidavit, Carrie referred to Jim (J.B. Turner) as "colored".

2. W.E. Palmer was Alex Haley's grandfather as portrayed by Stan Shaw. He married Cynthia Murray (Harvey in the miniseries). Part V opens in late summer 1932 with interaction between Wil Palmer and his grandson, Alex. Wil shows Alex a slice of a tree, explaining that time is short for people compared to the life of a tree. Alex's parents are living in Henning, waiting for Simon to be hired by a college. Eventually, Simon is hired by an Alabama College and the Haleys relocate there. After the move, Bertha learns that her father died in Henning. In reality, both Wil Palmer and Bertha Haley were dead by "late summer" 1932. Wil died on February 5, 1926, and Bertha died in Normal, Alabama, on February 16, 1932. The scene regarding the tree slice could not have happened as portrayed, since Alex was less than five years old when his grandfather died.

3. Part VII opens in October 1960 with the funeral of Aunt Lizzie Harvey. In reality, Elizabeth Murray died in 1952, preceded by her sister Cynthia in 1949.

Also in Part VII, Haley's interview of George Lincoln Rockwell is presented as having taken place prior to the assassination of Malcolm X when, in fact, the interview occurred in April 1966, more than a year after Malcolm X's death.

The producers aimed for casting high-quality actors and basically had no trouble signing the people they wanted because of the success of the first miniseries. While Georg Stanford Brown reprises his role as Tom Harvey, James Earl Jones was selected partially due to his physical resemblance to Haley. Wanting to also participate in the miniseries, Marlon Brando called "out of the blue" and asked for a small yet memorable role; he was cast as George Lincoln Rockwell and won an Emmy Award for his performance.

== Broadcast history ==
=== Episode lists ===
Roots: The Next Generations originally aired on ABC as 7 two-hour episodes on consecutive nights from February 18 to February 24, 1979.

Episode	Approximate time period	Featured Kinte descendants				
Episode	Approximate time period	Chicken George	Tom Harvey	Cynthia Harvey Palmer	Bertha Palmer Haley	Alex Haley
Part I	1882 – 1883	Yes	Yes	Yes		
Part II	1896 – 1897		Yes	Yes	Yes	
Part III	1914 – 1918			Yes	Yes	
Part IV	1918 – 1921			Yes	Yes	Yes
Part V	1932 – 1933			Yes	Yes	Yes
Part VI	1939 – 1950			Yes		Yes
Part VII	1960 – 1967					Yes

No.	Title	Directed by	Written by	Original runtime	Original release date
1	"Part I"	John Erman	Teleplay by : Ernest Kinoy	2 h	February 18, 1979
2	"Part II"	Charles S. Dubin	Teleplay by : Ernest Kinoy	2 h	February 19, 1979
3	"Part III"	John Erman	Teleplay by : Ernest Kinoy	2 h	February 20, 1979
4	"Part IV"	Charles S. Dubin	Teleplay by : Sydney A. Glass and Ernest Kinoy	2 h	February 21, 1979
5	"Part V"	Georg Stanford Brown	Teleplay by : Thad Mumford and Daniel Wilcox	2 h	February 22, 1979
6	"Part VI"	Lloyd Richards	Teleplay by : John McGreevey	2 h	February 23, 1979
7	"Part VII"	John Erman	Teleplay by : Ernest Kinoy	2 h	February 24, 1979

=== Ratings and viewers ===
The miniseries was watched by an estimated 110 million viewers and averaged a 30.1 rating and 45% share of the audience.

Episode	Weekly Ratings Ranking^{[a]}	Number of Households	Number of Viewers	Rating	Share	Date	Network
Part I	#8	N/A	65 million	27.8%	41%	February 18, 1979	ABC
Part II	#9	22 million	65 million	29.5%	N/A	February 19, 1979	ABC
Part III	#4	24.4 million	70 million	32.7%	50%	February 20, 1979	ABC
Part IV	#6	23.7 million	N/A	31.8%	N/A	February 21, 1979	ABC
Part V	#7	23.6 million	N/A	31.7%	N/A	February 22, 1979	ABC
Part VI	#10	21.5 million	N/A	28.9%	N/A	February 23, 1979	ABC
Part VII	#11	N/A	N/A	28.6%	N/A	February 24, 1979	ABC

^{^[a]}Part I aired a week prior to the rest of the series in the ratings.

== Awards ==
Won

Primetime Emmy Awards:

- Best Limited Series
- Outstanding Supporting Actor in a Limited Series or a Special – Marlon Brando for "Episode VII"

Nominations

Golden Globe Awards:

- Best TV Series – Drama

Primetime Emmy Awards:

- Outstanding Achievement in Makeup
- Outstanding Supporting Actor in a Limited Series or a Special – Al Freeman Jr. for "Episode VII"
- Outstanding Supporting Actor in a Limited Series or a Special – Paul Winfield for "Episode V"
- Outstanding Supporting Actress in a Limited Series or a Special – Ruby Dee
- Outstanding Writing in a Limited Series or a Special – Ernest Kinoy for "Episode I"

=== TV One ===
In July and September 2007, the TV One network reran the series hosted by several of the original cast including Lynne Moody, Dorian Harewood, Stan Shaw, Kristoff St. John, and Irene Cara.

== Home media ==
The miniseries was released on DVD by Warner Bros. on October 9, 2007.

== See also ==
- Alex Haley's Queen
