= Queen: The Story of an American Family =

Novel by Alex Haley and David Stevens

- Author: Alex Haley; David Stevens
- Genre: Historical fiction
- Published: 1993
- Publisher: William Morrow
- Publication place: United States
- Media type: Print

Queen: The Story of an American Family is a 1993 partly factual historical novel by Alex Haley and David Stevens.

It brought back to the consciousness of many white Americans the plight of the children of the plantation: the offspring of black slave women and their white masters, who were legally the property of their fathers.

A miniseries adaptation called Alex Haley's Queen and starring Halle Berry in the title role aired on CBS on February 14, 1993.

== Historical background ==
The noted author Alex Haley (1921–1992) was the grandson of Queen, the illegitimate and unacknowledged daughter of James "Jass" Jackson III (the son of a James Jackson a friend, but not a relative, of Andrew Jackson) and Easter, a slave he owned. Easter was the daughter of Captain Jack and Annie, who were enslaved by James Jackson II at the plantation The Forks of Cypress. Easter’s position at the plantation was as a weaver, while her daughter Queen became a servant to her half-sisters.

The novel recounts Queen's anguished early years as an enslaved girl, longing to know who her father was, and how it gradually dawned on her that he was her owner. Haley’s great-grandmother, Easter, died sometime around 1860 and was buried in the Forks of Cypress Cemetery.

After the American Civil War of 1861 to 1865, and the subsequent abolition of slavery, Queen was cast out. Jass Jackson would not acknowledge her as his daughter, afraid of compromising the inheritance of his legitimate children and goaded by his wife, who despised Queen. After many adventures, often unpleasant, she married a reasonably successful formerly enslaved man by the name of Alec Haley, and had one son with him (Simon Haley). Alec and Queen each had a son from previous relationships.

Simon Haley later attended Lane College in Jackson, Tennessee and earned his master's degree at Cornell University. He went on become Dean of Agriculture of Alabama A&M University. He then met his wife, Bertha Palmer, and they gave Queen three grandchildren: George, who became a lawyer; Julius, who became an architect; and Alex, who became a writer.

Alex Haley died before finishing Queen, and it was completed by David Stevens. While Stevens benefited from the many boxes of research notes and a 700-page outline of the story left behind by Haley, he would later say that his writing was guided mainly by their many long conversations.

== Haley lineage ==
Subsequent DNA testing of Alex Haley's nephew Chris Haley revealed that Alec Haley, Alex's paternal grandfather (and Queen Haley's husband) was most likely descended from Scottish ancestors via William Harwell Baugh, an overseer of an Alabama slave plantation.

== See also ==
- Slavery in the United States
- Treatment of slaves in the United States
