= Alex Haley's Queen =

- VHS cover
- Genre: Period
- Based on: Queen: The Story of an American Family by Alex Haley
- Teleplay by: David Stevens
- Directed by: John Erman
- Starring: Halle Berry; Danny Glover; Tucker Stone; Jasmine Guy; Tim Daly; Victor Garber; Martin Sheen; Paul Winfield; Raven-Symoné; Ann-Margret
- Theme music composer: Christopher Dedrick
- Country of origin: United States
- Original language: English
- No. of episodes: 3

Production
- Producers: David L. Wolper; Bernard Sofronski
- Editors: James Galloway; Paul LaMastra
- Running time: 282 minutes
- Production company: The Wolper Organization

Original release
- Network: CBS
- Release: February 14 – February 18, 1993

Related
- Roots: The Gift

Alex Haley's Queen (also known as Queen) is a 1993 American television miniseries that aired in three installments on February 14, 16, and 18 on CBS. The miniseries is an adaptation of the 1993 novel Queen: The Story of an American Family, by Alex Haley and David Stevens. The novel is based on the life of Queen Jackson Haley, Haley's paternal grandmother. Alex Haley died in February 1992 before completing the novel. It was later finished by David Stevens and published in 1993. Stevens also wrote the screenplay for the miniseries.

Alex Haley's Queen was directed by John Erman, and stars Halle Berry in the title role. It tells the life story of a young woman and it shows the problems which biracial slaves and former slaves faced in the United States during the 19th and 20th centuries. Throughout her life, Queen struggles to fit into the two cultures of her heritage; and at times, each side shuns her.

== Plot ==
=== Part 1 ===
The series begins on Forks of Cypress, a plantation near Florence in northern Alabama. James Jackson Jr., the son of the plantation owner, and Easter, a slave who works in the weaving house, have both grown up on the estate, and gradually their feelings for each other have developed into romance. Easter is the daughter of an African-American house slave, Captain Jack, and Annie, a part-Cherokee slave who is no longer on the Jackson property.

James Jackson Sr., an Irish immigrant who has accumulated considerable wealth, becomes ill and soon dies, leaving his wife Sally a widow. Grieving, James Jr. retreats to the comfort of the weaving house and he and Easter make love. Several months later, while they are alone, Easter reveals to him that she is pregnant with his child. Meanwhile, Sally encourages James Jr. to marry the respectable and wealthy heiress Elizabeth "Lizzie" Perkins, the daughter of a neighboring planter.

On April 8, 1841, Easter gives birth to a healthy girl. As the Jackson family dine with acquaintances, Captain Jack announces that a slave child has been born, and assures James, "Easter's doing just fine". Lizzie, who is present for the dinner, concludes that the new baby is James' child, excuses herself from the table and throws a fit. She vows to her mother that she'll never marry him, but her mother persuades her otherwise. Captain Jack begins to refer to the baby as Princess, but, when James enters the birth in the record book, he writes the name Queen, and leaves blank the section for the name of the father.

James proposes marriage to Lizzie the next evening; she accepts, and the pair are later married. Still in love with Easter, James continues to visit her frequently at night during both his engagement and his marriage. Later Lizzie learns that she has become pregnant. She and James welcome a daughter, Jane, whom Queen attends and serves. Although Jane and Queen are half-sisters, the family does not acknowledge that relationship.

James later proposes that Queen be trained as Jane's lady's maid. Both Easter and Lizzie oppose that plan, but James' word is final, so at age five Queen moves into the mansion. Jane and Queen grow up as playmates; however, the other slave children tease and torment Queen because of her light skin and her ability to read and write. By 1860, several years later, the two young ladies, Queen and Jane, have grown up, and they begin to attract the attention of the young men in Florence.

In the next year, 1861, Alabama secedes from the United States, the North declares war against the South, and James enters the Confederate Army and heads northward. As James rides away in a cavalry unit, Easter confirms to Queen that he is her "pappy".

On July 21, 1861, during the First Battle of Bull Run, in Prince William County, Virginia, near Manassas, James sustains an injury, and he is discharged and sent back home. There he learns that both Jane and Easter have died during an epidemic of diphtheria.

Queen continues to serve the aging Sally and Lizzie in the big house. Many of the field hands have left and gone north, and Queen takes over the duties of overseer, supervising the remaining slaves.

Soon James forms a regiment, receives a promotion to the rank of colonel, and heads back into the war. Eventually the Union Army reaches Florence and the Jackson plantation. Union soldiers loot and plunder, wantonly destroy property, insult the ladies and brutalize the slaves, for whose freedom they have claimed to be fighting. Captain Jack is injured, and dies as a free man, with Sally Jackson and Queen beside him. Meanwhile, Col. Jackson sustains another injury, which causes the amputation of his right arm without anesthesia.

Sally Jackson advises Queen to find a place to live among the newly freed blacks, saying that there is no food and no place for her at the estate; Queen strongly objects, insisting that the plantation is her home, and the Jacksons are her family. Parson Dick, another slave there, warns Queen about the difficulties awaiting mulattoes, quadroons, and octoroons in the new free society.

=== Part 2 ===
Mr. Henderson, the former overseer, and his wife have left the Jackson plantation, and they now run a nearby grocery store, where young redneck white men hang out, and James trades. Mr. and Mrs. Henderson, however, freely insult James and Queen.

After an unpleasant confrontation at the store with Mrs. Henderson and several of the rednecks, Queen runs away and hides until the next morning; tired and hungry, she returns home, only to be berated for her absence. Queen decides to leave the estate; as she visits the grave of her mother, Sally bids her goodbye and hands her a sum of money. After a brief encounter on the laneway with James, who has been out searching for her, Queen sets off on her own.

In Florence, Queen realizes how easily she can "pass" as a white lady; she buys a one-way stagecoach ticket and travels to Charleston, South Carolina.

At a charitable soup kitchen, Queen meets Alice, a fair-skinned young "colored" lady who is passing as white. Alice befriends Queen, takes her into her apartment, cleans her up, teaches her about passing, and takes her to a white dance hall; there she meets Alice's white gentleman friend, George, who gets Queen a job in a flower shop.

At the shop, Queen meets Digby, an injured former Confederate soldier, who quickly falls for her and proposes marriage. Queen accepts, then tells Alice, who insists that such a marriage would be dangerous and strongly urges Queen to break the engagement.

Queen goes to Digby's apartment, intending to break off the engagement. Digby begins to seduce Queen with some help from a dose of laudanum. Queen objects and resists, and blurts out that she is a Negro. Digby then flies into a rage, beats her, rapes her, and throws her out.

Queen returns to Alice, who also throws her out, to protect her own position and reputation. The next day, after a miserable night in a camp of black homeless people, Queen staggers into a meeting of a black church, where she receives help from a kindly woman, who later takes her to the home of two self-righteous and sanctimonious spinsters, Misses Mandy, and Giffery, who hire Queen as a live-in maid.

A few days later Davis, a gardener and a former slave, arrives in the spinsters' backyard in search of work. Queen and Davis start a friendship, which turns into romance and Queen becomes pregnant. Queen first seeks an abortion, then decides to keep the child; She confronts Davis, who invites her to meet him at the railway station, presumably to head north.

Queen waits at the station well into the evening, but Davis fails to appear, so she dejectedly returns to the old maids. Miss Mandy labels her as a wicked, naughty girl and a fallen sinner, but she and Miss Giffery allow her to remain. In due time the two spinsters, acting as midwives, attend the birth of a healthy boy. Queen wants to give him the name David, but at the insistence of the two women, the baby is christened Abner. Misses Mandy and Giffery increasingly take over Abner, apparently intending to raise him as though he were their own. One night, Queen flees and heads north with six-month-old Abner in her arms.

=== Part 3 ===
At a crossroads store and lunchroom, Queen meets Mrs. Benson, an upper-middle-class white mother of a 15-month-old son, for whom she needs a wet nurse. They ride away toward the Benson home, in Beaufort, South Carolina, which is south of Charleston and not on a direct way to Savannah, Tennessee (Queen's destination).

When Queen and Mrs. Benson arrive in Beaufort, they meet Mr. Benson amid a crowd of angry black former slaves, striking for more pay and more respect, under the vocal persuasion and agitation of Davis, Abner's father. Later Queen finds Davis, confronts him, berates him for having abandoned her and Abner. They eventually reconcile.

Unknown to Queen, Mr. Benson is a leader among the local Ku Klux Klan. Mrs. Benson, feigning concern for the security of Davis, urges Queen to leave Abner with her in safety while she warns Davis that he is in imminent danger of a "terrible work" of the Klan. Queen goes, and a Klansman follows; when she returns to the Benson home, Abner is not there. Mrs. Benson says that Abner "is doing God's work tonight"; the child is used as bait to lure Davis from his cabin. The next morning, Queen finds Davis' hanged and charred body; Abner is inside a wooden chicken cage at his father's feet.

In the next scene, Queen and Abner, now a toddler of about two years, board a small wooden ferryboat near Savannah, Hardin County, Tennessee, where they meet its operator, Alec Haley, and his son, Henry. Although Queen tells him she is travelling north, Alec persuades her to ride back to the south side, saying that in the North she would find only "cold weather and cold-hearted Yankees".

Soon Alec introduces Queen to Dora, the cook in the home of Mr. Cherry, a widower, who gives her a job as a maid. Brooding over her regrettable experiences, Queen adopts a defensive and disagreeable attitude; Dora tells her, "It's high time you figure out who your friends are, Missy", and Mr. Cherry tells her, "You are the most ornery maid I've ever had". Alec berates her for "never talking peaceable to a living soul" and "hating the world for whatever the world done to you". Gradually, Queen allows a friendship to develop between Alec and herself and changes her attitude; Mr. Cherry comments, "She really lights up this old place when she smiles". Queen and Alec's relationship grows into romance and eventually they are married; Mr. Cherry gives the bride away.

Queen and Alec have a child, whom Queen names as Simon; she expresses high hopes for his future. When he completes the sixth grade, the point at which black boys in the South typically (in the subject setting) drop out of school to start full-time work in the fields, as did Henry and Abner, Simon's teacher comments to Queen that he is "the best student in the district". Alec vigorously argues against Queen's wish that Simon stay in school, but Queen presents persuasive logic, and he eventually agrees to "waste" one of the three boys.

One day, Queen takes Abner and Simon back to the Forks of Cypress, the Jackson plantation, to show them where she was raised and to share her memories of her childhood. When they arrive there, the funeral for James Jackson, her father, takes place, and she pays her respect from a distance. Queen then shows her sons the weaving house, where she lived as a girl, along with her mother Easter's grave and the Jackson mansion. Inside the house, Lizzie Jackson accosts her bitterly and tells her that she does not belong there, as the mansion was never truly her home. Queen quickly leaves, feeling again sad and rejected by the white side of her family.

In due time, Simon becomes the first black boy in Savannah to complete grade school, and, after another major disagreement at home, Simon begins making plans to go to the normal school in Memphis, Tennessee.

Abner announces that he too wishes to go out into the world to make his own way. Alec reluctantly consents, but Queen objects emotionally, and during the conflict she reveals to Abner that Alec is not his real father. Anxious and upset, Queen begins stoking the wood-fired cast-iron cookstove; an accidental fire ignites her long dress; she runs out of the house and into the surrounding woodland. The fire in the dress dies out, and Queen sustains only minimal physical injuries. However, this last event in the series of accumulated tragic experiences of her past life causes her to have a mental breakdown; Alec commits her to a mental-health institution, in Bolivar, Tennessee, about 50 miles from home.

After several weeks in the depressing "lunatic asylum", Queen asks that Mr. Cherry visit her at the hospital. She tells her former employer about Abner's wish to "find his own place in the world". Since Queen and Alec have already given all their cash to Simon for his schooling, Queen asks Mr. Cherry for a loan of $50, which he graciously agrees to make. Queen tearfully thanks him and compliantly returns to her room.

Queen convinces the doctor at the asylum to allow her to go home to see her sons when they leave; Alec takes her home in a wagon. They take Abner and Simon on the ferryboat across the Tennessee River stream, and place them aboard a carriage bound for Memphis.

Back at home the aging couple sits on the front porch, and Queen for the first time tells Alec about her life, starting with her time as a slave girl with Jane at the Jackson plantation.

== Cast ==
- Halle Berry as Queen Jackson Haley
  - Raven-Symoné as Queen (age 5)
- Christopher Allport as Union Officer
- Ann-Margret as Sally Jackson
- Dan Biggers as George
- Leo Burmester as Henderson
- Patricia Clarkson as Lizzie Perkins Jackson
- Frances Conroy as Mrs. Benson
- Tim Daly as Colonel James Jackson Jr.
- Ossie Davis as Parson Dick
- Victor Garber as Digby
- Danny Glover as Alec Haley
- Ed Grady as Doctor
- John Griesemer as Doctor
- George Grizzard as Mr. Cherry
- Tim Guinee as Wesley
- Jasmine Guy as Easter
- Linda Hart as Mrs. Henderson
- Sada Thompson as Miss Mandy
- Elizabeth Wilson as Miss Giffery
- Erik King as Davy
- Dennis Haysbert as Davis
- Tommy Hollis as Fred
- Richard Jenkins as Mr. Benson
- Christine Jones as Sarah Jackson
- Jane Krakowski as Jane Jackson
- Patrick Malone as Simon
  - Jussie Smollett as Simon (age 11)
- Peter Maloney as Perkins
- Lonette McKee as Alice
- Kelly Neal as Henry Haley
  - Kenny Blank as Henry (age 11)
- Daryl "Chill" Mitchell as Abner
  - Chaz Lamar Shepherd as Abner (age 11)
- Charlotte Moore as Mrs. Perkins
- Martin Sheen as James Jackson Sr.
- Madge Sinclair as Dora
- Lorraine Toussaint as Joyce
- Eric Ware as Micah
- Paul Winfield as Cap'n Jack
- Samuel E. Wright as Alfred
- Tom Nowicki as Kirkman
- Richard Poe as James Jackson Jr.
- Kathryn Firago as Sassy
- Michael Edward as Judge
- Lane Bradbury as Mother
- Sue Ann Gilfillan as Teacher
- Beth Dixon as Nurse
- Michael L. Nesbitt as Porter
- Alan North as Bishop
- Danny Nelson as The Warden
- Isiah Whitlock Jr. as Preacher
- Walton Goggins as Young Man #1

== Home media ==
The series was released on VHS in August 1993 and was later released on DVD in 2008.

== Ratings and viewers ==
The miniseries averaged a 23.9 rating and 37% share for the three parts.

Episode	Weekly Ratings Ranking^{[a]}	Rating	Number of Viewers	Rating	Share	Date	Network
Queen Part I	#3	24.6 million	36.7 million	24.7%	35%	February 14, 1993	CBS
Queen Part II	#1	22.4 million	35.0 million	24.1%	37%	February 16, 1993	CBS
Queen Part III	#3	21.3 million	33.0 million	22.8%	N/A	February 18, 1993	CBS

^{^[a]}Part I aired a week prior to parts II and III in the ratings.

== Awards ==
Won

Emmy Awards:

- Outstanding Individual Achievement in Hairstyling for a Miniseries or a Special - Linda De Andrea

Image Awards

- Outstanding Television Movie or Mini-Series
- Outstanding Lead Actor in a Television Movie or Miniseries - Danny Glover
- Outstanding Lead Actress in a Television Movie or Miniseries - Halle Berry

Nominations

Golden Globe Awards

- Best Performance by an Actress in a Supporting Role in a Series, Mini-Series or Motion Picture Made for TV - Ann-Margret

Emmy Awards:

- Outstanding Miniseries
- Outstanding Supporting Actress in a Miniseries or a Special - Ann-Margret
- Outstanding Individual Achievement in Costume Design for a Miniseries or a Special
- Outstanding Individual Achievement in Makeup for a Miniseries or a Special
- Outstanding Individual Achievement in Sound Editing for a Miniseries or a Special
- Outstanding Individual Achievement in Sound Mixing for a Miniseries or a Special
- Outstanding Individual Achievement in Editing for a Miniseries or a Special - Single Camera Production

== See also ==
- Roots (1977 miniseries)
- Roots: The Next Generations
- List of films featuring slavery
