= The Forks of Cypress =

Alabama plantation

- U.S. National Register of Historic Places
- Alabama Register of Landmarks and Heritage
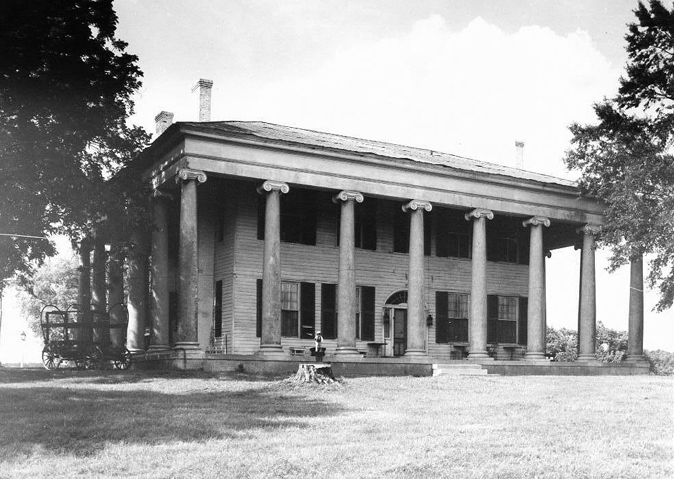
- The Forks of Cypress, the main house in 1935.

- Location within Alabama Location within the United States
- Nearest city: Florence, Alabama
- Coordinates: 34°50′42″N 87°43′32″W
- Built: 1830
- Architect: William Nichols
- NRHP reference No.: 97001166

Significant dates
- Added to NRHP: October 10, 1997
- Designated ARLH: April 14, 1992

The Forks of Cypress was a large slave-labour cotton farm and Greek Revival plantation house near Florence in Lauderdale County, Alabama, United States. It was designed by architect William Nichols for James Jackson and his wife, Sally Moore Jackson. Construction was completed in 1830. It was the only Greek Revival house in Alabama with a two-story colonnade around the entire house, composed of 24 Ionic columns. The name was derived from the fact that Big Cypress Creek and Little Cypress Creek, tributaries of Cypress Creek (Alabama), border the plantation and converge near the site of the main house. Although the main house was destroyed by fire in 1966 after being struck by lightning, the site was placed on the Alabama Register of Landmarks and Heritage on April 14, 1992 and the National Register of Historic Places on October 10, 1997. The site is the property of the State of Alabama; a local board has oversight.

== History ==
James Jackson was born October 25, 1782, in Ballybay, County Monaghan, Ireland. Jackson moved to Alabama from Nashville, Tennessee, in 1818. From 1822 on, he was active in state politics and served in both houses of the Alabama Legislature. In 1830, Jackson was named president of the Alabama Senate.

In the 1820s and 30s, James Jackson, an avid horseman, imported a dozen or more English thoroughbreds for breeding his own horses and in an effort to improve the overall bloodstock of the American thoroughbred. He was eminently successful in the effort, particularly with three of his imports: Leviathan in 1830, Gallopade in 1835 and Glencoe in 1836. American turf historian John Hervey rates James Jackson as "the most successful importer in the history of the American thoroughbred". James Jackson died on August 17, 1840, and was buried in the family cemetery, near the plantation house. His widow was the executor of his will and, on October 9, 1840, made bond in the amount of $400,000 (~$12.2 million in 2024). The will of James Jackson, recorded September 15, 1840, at the Lauderdale County Court House, directed his nephew Thomas Kirkman to manage a trust which would control and gradually sell off the racehorses, a duty Kirkman completed in 1848, with the sale of Glencoe.

Jackson and his family enslaved some of writer Alex Haley's ancestors on his plantation, which provides a setting for much of his book Queen: The Story of an American Family.

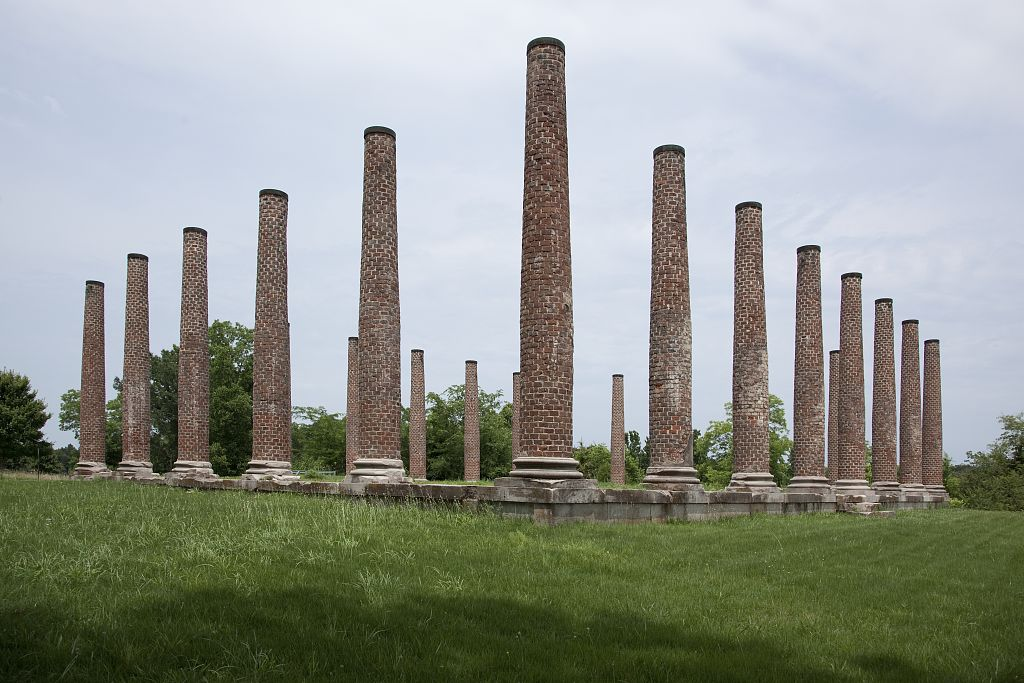
The ruins in 2010

During the American Civil War, the farm was owned by James' widow, Sarah Jackson, Invading Union forces used the lands of the Forks as a base camp.

Hugh Scott owned The Forks of Cypress in 1935 and by the 1940s sold the plantation to Rufus B. Dowdy (1897–1980), who restored the house and grounds. On June 6, 1966, the plantation house was struck by lightning and burned to the ground. It was never rebuilt, but the Dowdy family carefully preserved the brick pillars, still standing in picturesque ruin, as well as the original log house, several outbuildings, and the Jackson family cemetery. As of June 2017, all but one of the 24 brick pillars remain standing.

A near-replica of the main house was built in 1983 in downtown Florence, Alabama, at 321 N. Seminary Street, 5 miles (8.0 km) away from the original site. The replica serves as a Regions Bank branch.

Another replica of The Forks of Cypress was built in 2005 about 16 miles west of Florence, near the Historic Natchez Trace Parkway in western Lauderdale County. This building is a private residence and not open to the public.

== See also ==
- Andrew Jackson's plantations in northern Alabama
- Windsor Ruins
