= Forks of Cypress Cemetery =

Historic cemetery in Alabama

- U.S. National Register of Historic Places
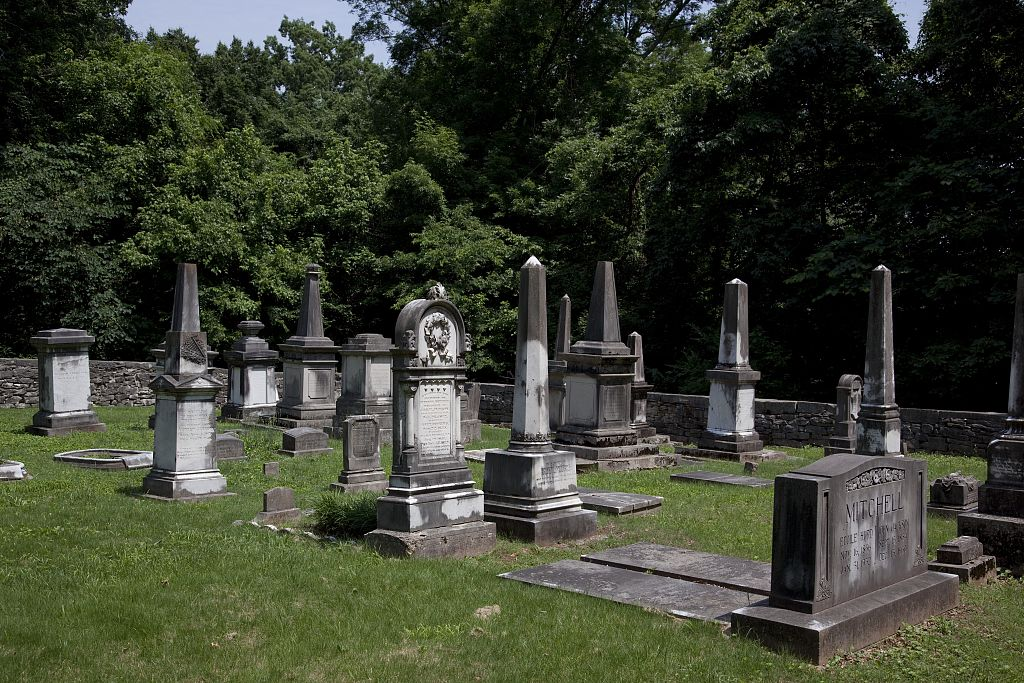
- The cemetery in 2010

- Location within Alabama Location within the United States
- Location: 0.25 mi. N of Jackson Rd., E side of Dowdy Rd, N of Little Cypress Creek, Florence, Alabama
- Coordinates: 34°50′53″N 87°43′19″W
- Area: 5 acres (2.0 ha)
- NRHP reference No.: 00000140
- Added to NRHP: February 24, 2000

Forks of Cypress Cemetery (also known as Jackson Cemetery) is a historic cemetery near Florence, Alabama. The cemetery contains the graves of Forks of Cypress owner James Jackson, several members of his family, and numerous slaves who worked on the plantation. Jackson, an immigrant from County Monaghan , Ireland, purchased the estate in 1821 and built the main house during the same year. The cemetery was established in 1819; the oldest interment, dating from 1820, is Jane Hanna. Occasionally, tours are hosted at the cemetery.

== Description ==
The cemetery is situated on 5 acres (2 ha) about 1000 feet (300 m) from the site of the main house. It is divided into the Jackson family plot, which is surrounded by a 4-foot (1.2-meter) tall stone wall, and the African-American section which contains graves of enslaved people who worked the plantation and later tenant farmers. Antebellum markers are the most elaborate, showing influences from popular residential architectural styles such as Greek Revival and Classical Revival. Most were made of gray limestone or marble and were variations of obelisks. Later monuments are primarily of granite, and are smaller, in deference either architecturally to the more elaborate markers that preceded them, or to the ancestral founders of the family. Two African-American slave jockeys are buried inside the family plot wall, showing the importance to Jackson of his stable of race horses. The African American section of the cemetery is the resting place of over 250 of the plantation's enslaved workers, as well as many of their free descendants. The graves, mostly unmarked, represent one of the largest African-American cemeteries in the region. Author Alex Haley's great-grandmother, Easter, is buried in the cemetery.

The cemetery was listed on the National Register of Historic Places in 2000.

== See also ==
- Forks of Cypress
- James Jackson (Alabama politician)
