= George W. Haley =

American diplomat (1925–2015)

United States Ambassador to the Gambia
- In office October 1998 – 2001
- President: Bill Clinton; George W. Bush
- Preceded by: Gerald W. Scott
- Succeeded by: Jackson McDonald

Member of the Kansas State Senate
- In office 1964–1968

Personal details
- Born: George Williford Boyce Haley; August 28, 1925 Henning, Tennessee, U.S.
- Died: May 13, 2015 (aged 89) Silver Spring, Maryland, U.S.
- Party: Republican
- Spouse: Doris M. Haley
- Relations: Simon Haley (father); Alex Haley (brother)
- Children: 2, including David Haley
- Education: Morehouse College; University of Arkansas

George Williford Boyce Haley (August 28, 1925 – May 13, 2015) was an American attorney, diplomat and policy expert who served under seven presidential administrations. He was one of two younger brothers to the Pulitzer Prize winner Alex Haley.

== Early life and education ==
Born in Henning, Tennessee to Simon Haley and his first wife Bertha, he was the second of their three sons, between Alex and Julius (who grew up to be an architect). His family moved to Pine Bluff, Arkansas and he spent a part of his childhood there. He spent his High school education in Memphis Tennessee at the Booker T. Washington High School. He attended the Bordentown School in Bordentown, New Jersey. He was a classmate and contemporary of Martin Luther King Jr. at Morehouse College in Atlanta, Georgia.

Haley was the second African-American to receive a law degree from the University of Arkansas. Despite being separated from the rest of the student body and living in the cramped basement of one the school buildings he graduated from Arkansas Law in 1952. Following that he joined Kansas law firm Steven Jackson where he worked with attorney and future Supreme Court Justice Thurgood Marshall on the landmark case Brown v. Topeka, Kansas Board of Education case challenging the "separate but equal" doctrine in the prior case of Plessy v. Ferguson.

== Political career ==
Haley was elected to the Kansas State Senate in 1964 as a Republican and served one term. Haley served in national administrations beginning in 1969 under Presidents Richard Nixon, Gerald Ford, Jimmy Carter, Ronald Reagan, George H. W. Bush, Clinton, and George W. Bush. His government posts included chief counsel of the Federal Transit Administration from 1969 to 1973 and general counsel and congressional liaison of the U.S. Information Agency, now part of the State Department, from 1976 to 1977. He ran unsuccessfully for the United States House of Representatives from Kansas in 1966 and for the United States Senate from Maryland in 1986. In 1990, President George H. W. Bush appointed Haley chairman of the Postal Rate Commission. Haley served as Chairman of the Commission from February 14, 1990 until October 14, 1993, and later as a Commissioner from December 1, 1993 until September 10, 1998.

Haley served as United States Ambassador to The Gambia under President Bill Clinton until 2001. Haley died on May 13, 2015, aged 89.

Diplomatic posts
Preceded by Gerald W. Scott	United States Ambassador to the Gambia; 1998–2001	Succeeded by Jackson McDonald
