= James Jackson (Alabama politician) =

Lauderdale County slave owner and horse breeder (1782–1840)

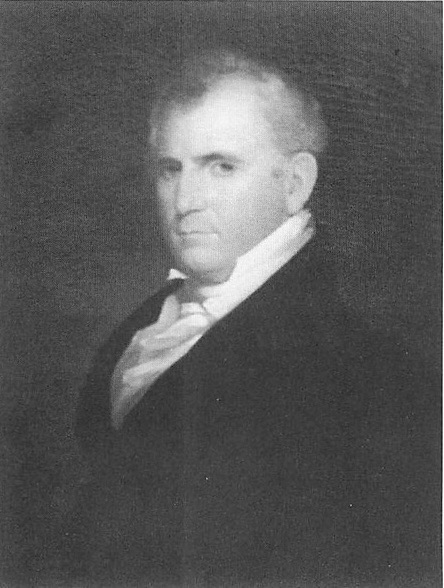
James Jackson - Tennessee and Alabama - 1782–1840 - Oil on canvas by unknown artist. (Courtesy of Charles P. Jackson, The Papers of Andrew Jackson, Vol. V)

James Jackson (1782–August 1840) was an Irish-American immigrant merchant, land speculator, plantation owner, racehorse owner, and Alabama politician.

== Early life ==
Jackson was born in Ballybay, Ireland, where he was raised and where he was educated as a civil engineer. He came to the United States in 1799. He lived first in Philadelphia and then relocated to Nashville.

== Career ==
He had a business relationship with Andrew Jackson, future U.S. president, in the first decades of the 19th century. To the best knowledge of historians, there is no family tie between James and Andrew Jackson. Andrew Jackson and James Jackson engaged in land speculations.

When he lived in Nashville, James together with his brother Washington Jackson had a "large dry-goods store on the square." In a list of expenses accrued by Aaron Burr in account with Andrew Jackson at the time of the Burr expedition, one of the line items was $44 paid to "W. & J. Jackson bill do."

According to The Papers of Andrew Jackson (1984), James Jackson was a "private banker for Andrew, extending large sums of money on promissory notes. They were later partners in numerous land ventures, including the Chickasaw Purchase speculation." For instance, in 1813 James Jackson lent Andrew Jackson $1,000 to cover logistics (wagons to haul the sick and provision the troops with cornmeal, flour, and beef) for the return trip to Tennessee on the government-rejected adventure that was the Natchez Expedition, and in 1818 he lent Jackson about $5,500 so that he could buy land in Lauderdale County, Alabama Territory for himself and his late business partner's orphaned son.

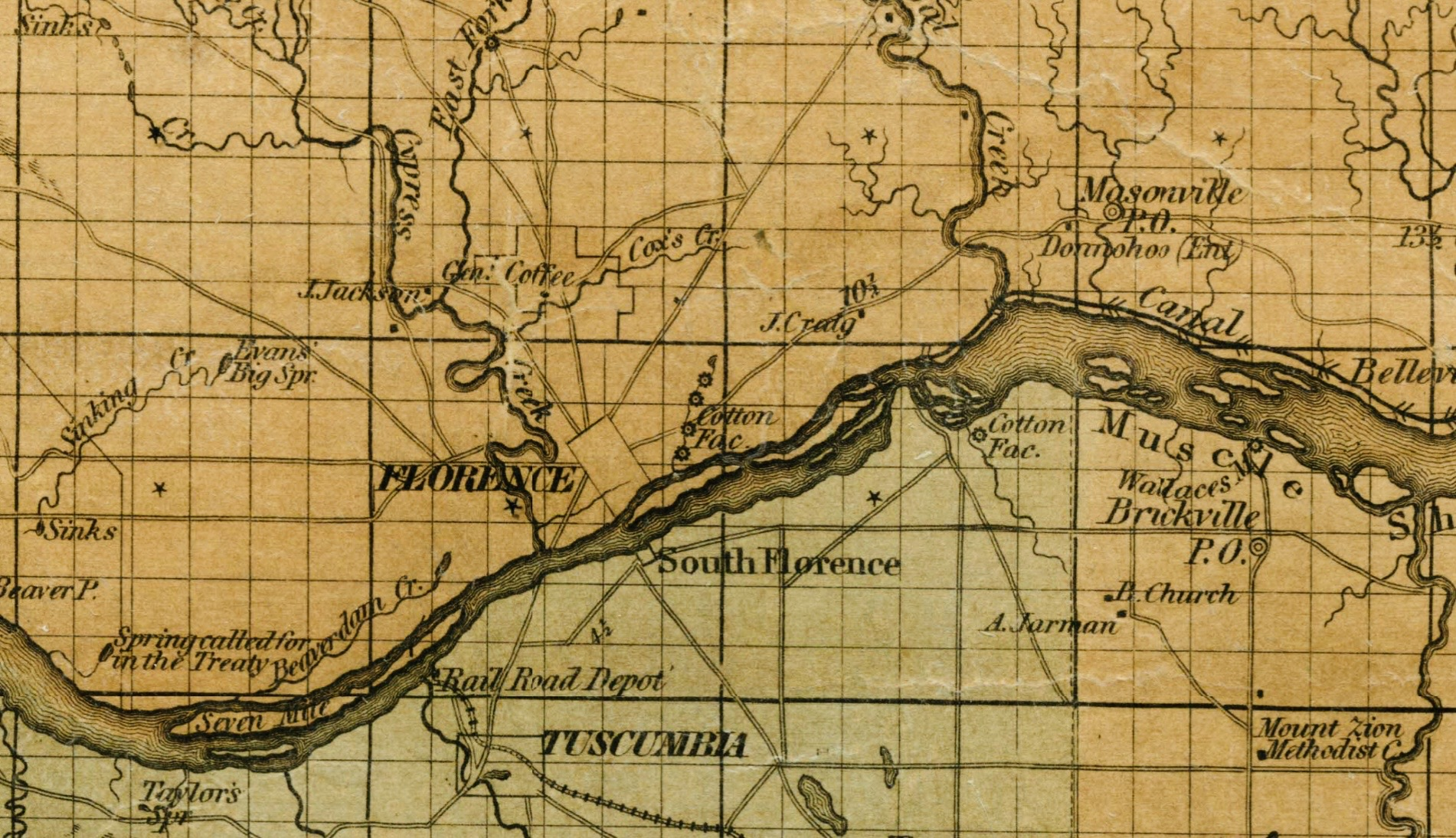
J. Jackson at the Forks of Cypress in 1837

James Jackson left Nashville for Florence, Alabama where he "bought a stock-farm. According to the American Guide for Alabama published by the New Deal Federal Writers' Project, the farm was located off of Alabama State Highway 34. Construction on Forks of Cypress began in 1820, and the main house was "encircled by a peristyle of 20 large Ionic columns of brick covered with plaster made from sand and molasses. This unorthodox treatment was apparently effective, for the columns are well-preserved. The house is a solidly built frame structure with a rear cross-hall intersecting the wide, full-length central hall...Thoroughbred horses were raised on the 3,000-acre estate. Of the several horses which were sent into competition for rich stakes in the East, Glencoe and Peyton, were the best known." Among the amenities were "a regulation racetrack in the flat meadow in front of the mansion". He also reportedly raced horses at Huntsville (possibly at the Green Bottom Inn), and at Col. Colwell's track near Fort Mitchell.

In 1822, Andrew Jackson's nephew Stockley D. Hays was living in James Jackson's old Tennessee house, Greenvale, which stood on the road between Nashville and Haysborough.

In 1822 Jackson was elected to the Alabama legislature for the first time. He represented Lauderdale County in the Alabama House of Representatives in 1822, 1823, 1833, and 1834, and he represented Lauderdale County in the Alabama Senate in 1825, 1826, 1830, and 1831.

In 1824, Jesse Benton alleged that Andrew Jackson, John Eaton, and James Jackson had been investors in a criminal land speculation in 1818, buying up lots in Pensacola just before General Jackson invaded, which is called the First Seminole War, and which pushed the Spanish to sell Florida to the United States under the terms of the Adams–Onís Treaty.

Despite his long association with Jackson, founder of the Democratic Party, by 1827 James Jackson turned toward opposing candidates. According to one school of thought this was because he had been "left hanging" in a speculation on land made newly available for purchase by treaty with the Chickasaw. James Jackson even placed wagers in favor of "Whig" candidates John Bell and John Quincy Adams, which demonstrated his "confidence in [Henry] Clay's whole political network, and showed them that they had gained an aggressive advocate worthy of patronage." In 1828, William Berkeley Lewis wrote John Coffee to ask if he thought "Jimmy" Jackson had been involved in reports to the newspapers about possibly corrupt actions on the part of Andrew Jackson in the Colbert Reservations of the 1818 Chickasaw treaty. An Irish historian investigating the immigrant family noted that it "is symptomatic of Jackson's personality that a close and profitable relationship that lasted for a quarter century became distant and uncommunicative."

Jackson served as president of the Alabama State Senate in 1831–1832. As told in an account of 1876, "James Jackson, who was the leader of the Whig party during his life-time was frequently elected to the Legislature and was made speaker of the House. His contemporaries have said that he was par excellence the best presiding officer that ever occupied the chair."

Jackson was famous as a racehorse breeder in later life. Along with Andrew Jackson, George Elliott, the Barrys, Eli Odom, the Kirkmans, the Polks, Dr. John Shelby, Dr. Sappington, Mr. Robert Smith, General Desha, Newton Cannon, the McGavocks, William G. Harding, and Balie Peyton, James Jackson was an associate of turfman "Uncle" Green Berry Williams.

In November 1847 the trustees of Jackson's estate listed for sale almost 1400 acres of land included "fresh cleared" plantation land, town lots, and a forested island. In January 1848 the trustees of Jackson's estate listed for sale 75 slaves, which were "the portion of the Negroes, which, on division are reserved in trust for the benefit of his daughters. Mrs. Martha Andrews, Mrs. Ellen Hunt and Mrs. Sarah Polk, on a credit of One and Two years, for drafts on New Orleans." In 1850 his widow Sarah Jackson owned 65 slaves. In 1860 his widow Sarah Jackson owned 80 slaves.

Ancestors of Alex Haley, author of Roots and Queen, were enslaved by the Jacksons at the Forks of Cypress.

== Siblings ==
Jackson was business partners with his brothers John Jackson (1773–1832), and Washington Jackson (1784–1865). They were said to have relatives remaining in Pennsylvania. John Jackson was the fourth-born of the 10 Jackson siblings. His wife was a McCrea (McRae). They had no children. John Jackson did business deals, including land speculations, with his brother-in-law. In 1823 he opened the Florence Hotel in Florence, Alabama, where he died in 1832.

== See also ==
- Forks of Cypress Cemetery
- William Smith (South Carolina politician), another Andrew Jackson ally who served as Alabama Senate President
- Horses of Andrew Jackson

== Sources ==
- Cohen, Kenneth (Winter 2011). "'The Entreaties and Perswasions of our Acquaintance' Gambling and Networks in Early America". Journal of the Early Republic. 31 (4): 599–638. doi:10.1353/jer.2011.0056. ISSN 0275-1275. JSTOR 41261653.
- Farrell, W. E. (2007). "Andrew Jackson 7th President of the United States and the Jacksons of Ballybay 1803–1824". Clogher Record. 19 (2/3): 202–238. doi:10.2307/27699566. JSTOR 27699566.
- Murphy, James Edward (Spring 1971). "Jackson and the Tennessee Opposition". Tennessee Historical Quarterly. 30 (1): 50–69. ISSN 0040-3261.
- Jackson, Andrew (1984). Moser, Harold; Macpherson, Sharon (eds.). The Papers of Andrew Jackson, Volume II, 1804–1813. University of Tennessee Press. doi:10.7290/utp3038. ISBN 978-0-87049-441-3.
- ——— (2002). Moser, Harold; Clift, J. Clint; Wells, Wyatt (eds.). The Papers of Andrew Jackson, Volume VI, 1825–1828. University of Tennessee Press. doi:10.7290/utp7151. ISBN 978-1-57233-174-7.
- Marks, Henry (April 1973). "Andrew Jackson's Activities in the Tennessee Valley". Huntsville Historical Review. 3 (2) 4: 27–36 – via M. Louis Salmon Library, University of Alabama at Huntsville.
- Rice, Turner (1975a). "Andrew Jackson and His Northwest Alabama Interests". Journal of Muscle Shoals History. 3. University of North Alabama. Florence, Alabama: Tennessee Valley Historical Society: 3–12. ISSN 0094-8039. LCCN 74646773. OCLC 1795446.
- Rothstein, Morton (1979). "The Changing Social Networks and Investment Behavior of a Slaveholding Elite in the Ante Bellum South: Some Natchez Nabobs, 1800–1860". In Greenfield, Sidney M.; Strickon, Arnold; Aubey, Robert T. (eds.). Entrepreneurs in Cultural Context. School of American Research, Advanced Seminar Series. Albuquerque: University of New Mexico Press. pp. 65–88. ISBN 978-0-8263-0504-6. LCCN 78021433. OCLC 4859059.
