= The Sum of Us (film) =

1994 film by Kevin Dowling

- Directed by: Geoff Burton; Kevin Dowling
- Written by: David Stevens (play and screenplay)
- Produced by: Hal McElroy
- Starring: Jack Thompson; Russell Crowe; John Polson; Deborah Kennedy
- Cinematography: Geoff Burton
- Edited by: Frans Vandenburg
- Music by: Dave Faulkner
- Distributed by: The Samuel Goldwyn Company; Australian Film Commission
- Release date: 12 July 1994
- Running time: 100 minutes
- Country: Australia
- Language: English
- Box office: $3.8 million

The Sum of Us is a 1994 Australian LGBTQ-related comedy drama film directed by Kevin Dowling and Geoff Burton. The film is based on the 1990 play of the same name by David Stevens, who also wrote the screenplay. The film stars Russell Crowe and Jack Thompson. The screen adaptation mimics the play's device of breaking the fourth wall with direct to camera conversational asides by both Harry and Jeff Mitchell.

== Plot ==
Widower Harry Mitchell (Thompson) lives with his gay son Jeff (Crowe), with both men struggling in their searches for true love. Harry is completely comfortable with his son's sexuality, and is almost over-eager in his support for his son's search for a boyfriend. Harry meets an attractive but judgmental divorcee through a dating service, and this leads to some conflict between the two main characters. However, when Harry suffers a stroke and loses the power of speech, the story takes a darker turn, becoming a meditation on the enduring strength of love, both familial and romantic, in the face of adversity.

== Cast ==
- Jack Thompson as Harry Mitchell
- Russell Crowe as Jeff Mitchell
- John Polson as Greg
- Deborah Kennedy as Joyce Johnson
- Joss Moroney as Young Jeff
- Mitch Mathews as Gran
- Julie Herbert as Mary
- Des James as Football Coach
- Mick Campbell as Footballer
- Donny Muntz as Ferry Captain
- Jan Adele as Barmaid
- Rebekah Elmaloglou as Jenny Johnson
- Lola Nixon as Desiree
- Sally Cahill as Greg's Mother
- Bob Baines as Greg's Father

== Box office ==
The Sum of Us grossed $3,827,456 at the box office in Australia.

== Awards ==
The film was nominated for Best Film and Stevens' screenplay won Best Adapted Screenplay at the 1994 Australian Film Institute Awards, while Polson and Kennedy were nominated for best supporting actors, and Frans Vanderburg for editing and the sound team. Other accolades came at the Montreal World Film Festival, and the film was named Best Film at the Cleveland International Film Festival.

== See also ==
- Cinema of Australia
