= Mama Flora's Family =

1997 historical fiction novel by Alex Haley and David Stevens

- Author: Alex Haley
- Publisher: Ithaca ILR Press
- Publication date: 1997

Mama Flora's Family
- Based on: Mama Flora's Family by Alex Haley; David Stevens
- Teleplay by: David Stevens; Carol Schreder
- Directed by: Peter Werner
- Starring: Cicely Tyson; Blair Underwood; Queen Latifah; Mario Van Peebles; Erika Alexander; Tanya Wright; David Ramsey; Shemar Moore; Novella Nelson; Lou Myers
- Music by: J. A. C. Redford
- Country of origin: United States
- Original language: English

Production
- Producers: Lisa Lindstrom; Carol Schreder
- Cinematography: Neil Roach
- Editor: Tod Feuerman
- Running time: 60 mins (2 episodes)

Original release
- Network: CBS
- Release: November 8, 1998 – 1998

Mama Flora's Family is a 1997 historical fiction novel by Alex Haley and David Stevens. The story spans from the 1920s to the 1970s as it follows Flora, a daughter of poor black Mississippi sharecroppers, and her descendants. Haley died before completing the novel, with Stevens finishing the story line.

In 1998 the book was adapted into a made for TV miniseries of the same name.

== Synopsis ==
The young Flora meets the wealthy Lincoln Flemming at a dance one night. Lincoln wants her to come care for his elderly grandmother Nana at his home, to which she agrees. Eventually Flora becomes sexually involved with Lincoln and believes the two of them to be romantically involved. After experiencing him shun and shame her in front of his rich contemporaries, Flora begins to feel used and refuses to sleep with him anymore. This prompts her to become evicted from the house. Flora later discovers that she is pregnant with Lincoln's child, which prompts his wealthy family to bribe her into leaving Mississippi to avoid scandal. Flora takes the offer, planning to go to Memphis, Tennessee. She gives birth to a boy and names him Luke, but is forced to give the baby to the Flemmings to raise.

Flora then travels by train to the city, but is instead directed by a fellow passenger to go to the small town of Stockton under the advice that a young woman such as her should not go into the city alone. Once there, she gains employment and shelter through the Reverend Jackson.

While living in Stockton Flora meets and falls in love with Booker Palmer. The two marry, have a son named Willie, and Booker becomes a sharecropper soon after they marry. Booker experiences financial difficulties, which force him to steal cotton from other farmers. During one of his nightly runs, he is shot and killed. Flora later buries Booker, but only after remaining with his body all night. Shortly thereafter Flora receives news that her sister Jossie is ill and dying. Flora travels to her sister and ends up taking her niece Ruthana back with her to raise as her own daughter. Throughout the 1930s Flora raises both Willy and Ruthana in Stockton, but when Willie gets into a fight with some White boys he's forced to escape to Chicago where Ruthana's father lives. Once there, Willy stays with Georgy, who shows him the area and finds Willy a job. One night Willy ends up gambling and smoking marijuana, which causes him to lose his home. Willy moves into a basement with his friend Josh, who is later arrested for dealing drugs. During all of this time Willy continues to write his mother, cousin, and his girlfriend Ernestine, but lies and tells them that everything is fine. Later at the outbreak of World War II, Willy joins the army and upon his return he proposes to his girlfriend. The two marry, move to Chicago, and have three children.

Around the same time, Ruthana attends Fisk University. While Ruthana is away in college, Flora returns to Mississippi to find her son Luke. She returns to the Flemming Mansion and obtains her son's address from the mansion's cook. Flora writes to Luke, who comes to find her. She discovers that Luke has graduated from law school and is joining the army. Luke and Flora remain in touch. Upon his return from the war he opens a practice in Harlem.

After Ruthana graduates she takes a job as a social worker in Harlem, only to discover that Ernestine is very sick. The doctors are unable to discover what is wrong with her, and she later has a heart attack in her sleep. Ruthana helps her cousin Willy raise the children.

== Reception ==
Critical reception for the book was mixed, with Kirkus Reviews calling the book "an affecting if superficial take on recent racial history". Publishers Weekly mostly panned Mama Flora's Family, stating that the book lost "the human touch that animates the novel's first half".

== Miniseries ==
In November 1998 a two-part miniseries adaptation of Mama Flora's Family aired on CBS. The miniseries starred Cicely Tyson as Flora Palmer, making it her second time performing in an adaptation of Haley's work. Georgia Allen played Nana.

Critical reception for the miniseries was mixed, with some reviewers comparing it unfavorably to Haley's Roots miniseries. Tyson won an NAACP Image Award in 1999 for her role as Mama Flora.
