= David Stevens (screenwriter) =

Australian writer and director (1940-2018)

- Born: 22 December 1940; Tiberias, British Palestine
- Died: 17 July 2018 (aged 77); Whangārei, New Zealand
- Occupations: Screenwriter, director

David Stevens (22 December 1940 – 17 July 2018) was an Australian writer and director, best known for his work on Breaker Morant, A Town Like Alice, and The Sum of Us.

== Biography ==
Stevens was born in 1940 in Tiberias, British Palestine, where his British father was an aircraft engineer working on flying boats. In 1960, he left to emigrate to Australia, however his ship was diverted to New Zealand where he remained, until moving to Australia in the early 1970s.

Stevens co-wrote Breaker Morant with Bruce Beresford and Jonathan Hardy, earning an Oscar nomination. He wrote the play The Sum of Us, which ran in New York for a year and won the Outer Critics Circle Award. He adapted it into a feature film, featuring Russell Crowe and Jack Thompson, which won an Australian Film Institute Award for Best Screenplay.

The Sum of Us is the third play in Stevens' "A Currency Trilogy". The first play is The Inn at the Beginning of the World. The second is The Beast and the Beauty, which had its world premiere at the Old Mill Theatre, South Perth, on 22 June 2012.

Stevens directed the Emmy Award-winning mini-series A Town Like Alice and wrote three novels – The Waters of Babylon, and two in collaboration with Alex Haley: Queen and Mama Flora's Family, which he then adapted into TV miniseries. These are Alex Haley's Queen (1993) for which he wrote the teleplay and Mama Flora's Family (1998).

For his work with Haley, Stevens received an Image Award from the NAACP.

He lived in Tutukaka Coast, Northland, New Zealand, and was an active member of the aviation website Airliners.net.

Stevens died in Whangārei, New Zealand on 18 July 2018 at the age of 77. He was openly gay and survived by his partner Loren Boothby.

== Selected credits ==
- An Awful Silence (1972)
- A Town Like Alice (1981) (mini-series)
- The Clinic (1983)
- A Thousand Skies (1985)
