= The Sum of Us (play) =

Play by David Stevens

The Sum of Us is a 1990 play by David Stevens. It is the third play in his now completed A Currency Trilogy of which the first play is The Inn at the Beginning of the World. The second play is The Beast and the Beauty produced by the Old Mill Theatre, Perth, on 22 June 2012.

== Plot ==
The plot revolves around the comfortable relationship between widower Harry and his gay son Jeff and their individual searches for the right mate. Harry unconditionally loves his rugby-playing son and even takes an active part in Jeff's search for Mr. Right. Harry reveals that his mother (Jeff's grandmother) was a lesbian, perhaps accounting for his accepting attitude toward Jeff. Jeff's new boyfriend, Greg, who is closeted from his own homophobic father, finds it difficult to relate to Harry's well-meaning matchmaking ways. Greg is ejected from his own home by his father when he discovers his son's sexuality. Harry, via a video dating service, finds a woman that he likes, a divorcee named Joyce, who may not be so understanding after spying a gay magazine in Harry and Jeff's house. Unfortunately, Harry suffers a massive stroke and is left unable to speak or walk. Jeff cares for him as best as he can, taking him to the park for an outing one day. Jeff and Greg meet up in the park and agree to try and rekindle their romance, while Jeff's father, although unable to speak, gives his overwhelming approval.

== Production ==
The play, directed by Kevin Dowling, opened on October 16, 1990 at the Off-Broadway Cherry Lane Theatre, where it ran for 335 performances. Tony Goldwyn and Richard Venture headed the cast. The play won the Outer Critics Circle Award for the Outstanding Off-Broadway Play 1990–1991 and Goldwyn won an Obie Award for his performance.

The first production in Australia was in 1992 by the Sydney Theatre Company at the Wharf Studio Theatre with Ron Graham and Peter Phelps. A new production is touring capital cities, regional and remote venues across Australia in 2011. Produced by Christine Harris and HIT Productions, the cast includes one of Australia's most well-known television, theatre and film actors John Jarratt, alongside Patrick Harvey, Glenn van Oosterom, and Nell Feeney. Directed by Green Room Awards winner Denis Moore.

== Adaptation ==
A 1994 Australian film adaptation also titled The Sum of Us was directed by Dowling and Geoff Burton and starred Russell Crowe and Jack Thompson. The screen adaptation mimics the play's device of breaking the fourth wall with direct to camera conversational asides by both Harry and Jeff. Stevens' screenplay won awards from the Australian Film Institute and the Montreal World Film Festival, and the movie was named Best Film at the Cleveland International Film Festival.

== See also ==
- Cinema of Australia
