= Simon Haley =

American agriculture professor (1892–1973)

Simon Alexander Haley (March 8, 1892 – August 19, 1973) was a professor of agriculture and father of writer Alex Haley. He was born in Savannah, Tennessee, to farmer Alexander "Alec" Haley and his wife Queen (Davy) Haley (née Jackson). Both his parents were enslaved from birth, and white owners apparently fathered both. Simon attended Lane College in Jackson, Tennessee, at age 15.

After Haley was discharged honorably from the army after World War I, on September 28, 1920, he married Bertha George Palmer, the daughter of William E. and Cynthia Murray Palmer of Henning, Tennessee. Bertha was also a Lane College alum. The couple had three sons - Alexander Murray Palmer (1921–1992), George Williford Boyce (1925–2015) (who became a lawyer, the first Black Kansas state senator and, later, U.S. Ambassador to The Gambia), and Julius Cornell Embree (1930–2010) (who became an architect).

Simon received a fellowship from the Rosenwald Fund in 1930 which enabled him to obtain a master's degree in agriculture at Cornell University. Bertha died on February 16, 1932, in Normal, Madison County, Alabama, after suffering for a year from "general glandular tuberculosis", according to her death certificate. In September 1932, Simon married professor Zeona Eubank Hatcher, with whom he had a daughter, Lois Ann (1933–2004). Simon Haley had positions at various southern universities, including Alabama A&M just north of Huntsville, Alabama. He died in Martinsburg, Berkeley County, West Virginia and was buried at Little Rock National Cemetery in Little Rock, Arkansas.

== Haley lineage ==
DNA testing of Simon's grandson Chris (via his youngest son Julius) revealed that Simon's father Alec was most likely descended from Scottish ancestors via William Harwell Baugh, an overseer of an Alabama slave plantation.
