= Alex Haley =

American writer (1921–1992)

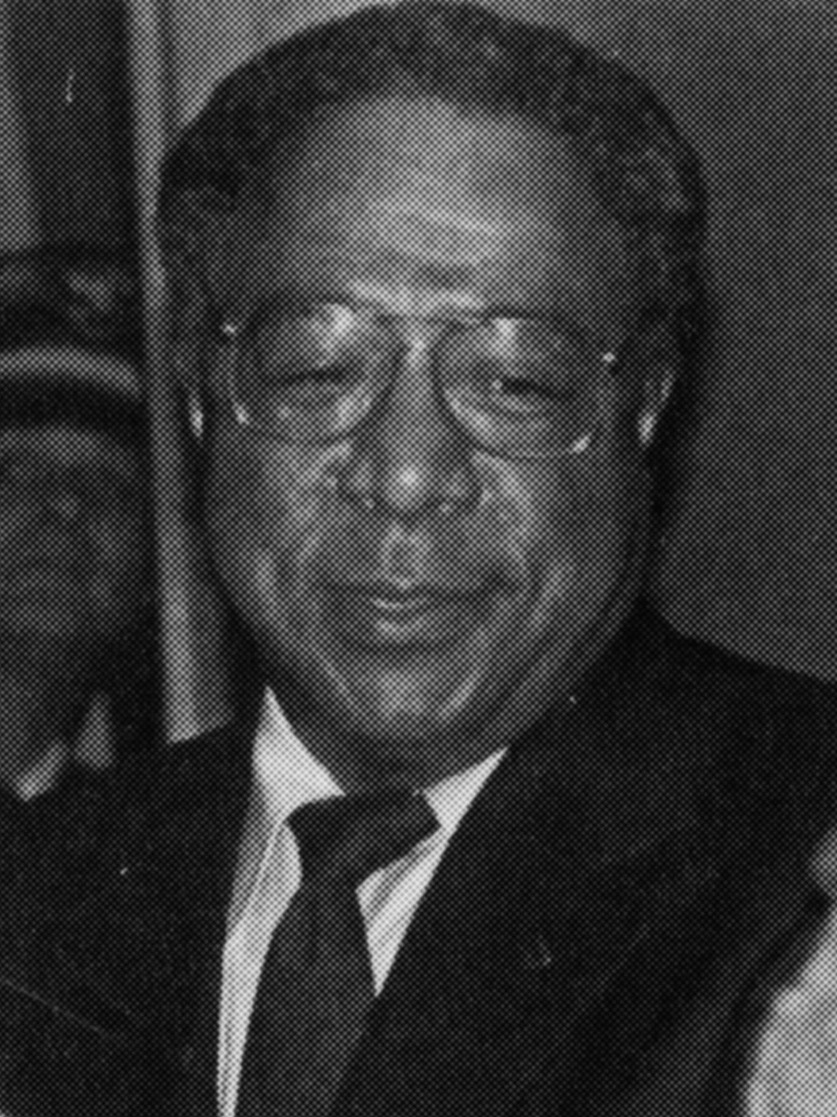
- Haley in 1980
- Born: Alexander Murray Palmer Haley; August 11, 1921; Ithaca, New York, U.S.
- Died: February 10, 1992 (aged 70); Seattle, Washington, U.S.
- Occupations: Coast Guardsman, writer
- Spouse(s): Nannie Branch (m. 1941; div. 1964) Juliette Collins (m. 1964; div. 1972) Myran Lewis (m. 1977)
- Children: Lydia, William Alex, Dolores, and Alexander Murray Palmer Jr.
- Relatives: Simon Haley (father); George W. Haley (brother)
- Writing career
- Years active: 1939–1992
- Military service
- Allegiance: United States
- Branch: United States Coast Guard
- Service years: 1939–1959
- Rank: Chief Petty Officer

Alexander Murray Palmer Haley (August 11, 1921 – February 10, 1992) was an American writer and the author of the 1976 book Roots: The Saga of an American Family. ABC adapted the book as a television miniseries of the same name and aired it in 1977 to a record-breaking audience of 130 million viewers. In the United States, the book and miniseries raised the public awareness of black American history and inspired a broad interest in genealogy and family history. Haley's first book was The Autobiography of Malcolm X, published in 1965, a collaboration through numerous lengthy interviews with Malcolm X.

He was working on a second family history novel at his death. Haley had requested that David Stevens, a screenwriter, complete it; the book was published as Queen: The Story of an American Family. It was adapted as a miniseries, Alex Haley's Queen, broadcast in 1993.

== Early life and education ==
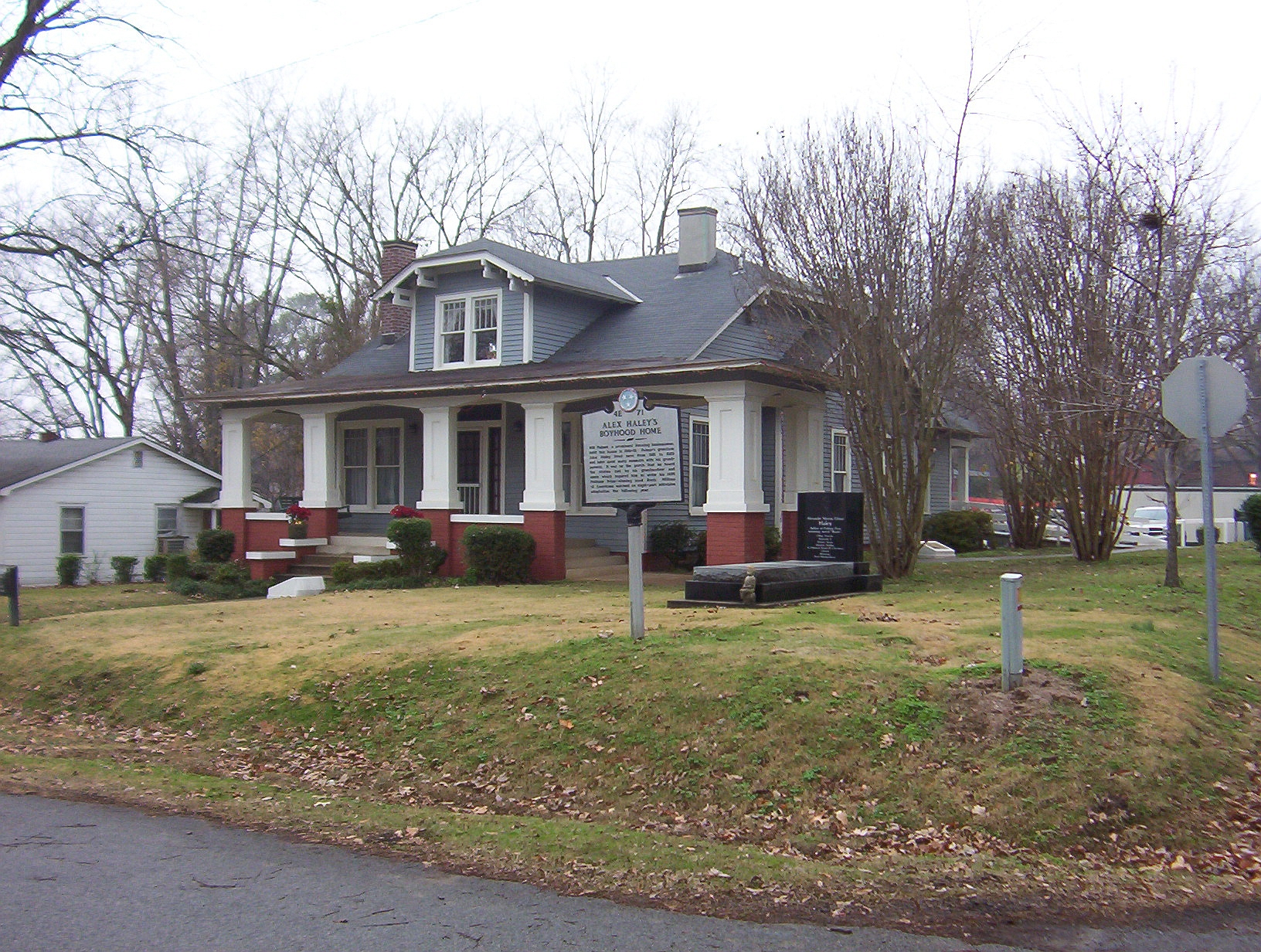
Haley's boyhood home at Henning, Tennessee, in 2007

Alex Haley was born in Ithaca, New York, on August 11, 1921, and was the eldest of three brothers (the other two being George and Julius) and a half-sister (from his father's second marriage). Haley lived with his family in Henning, Tennessee, before returning to Ithaca with his family when he was five years old. Haley's father was Simon Haley, a professor of agriculture at Alabama A&M University, and his mother was Bertha George Haley (née Palmer), who had grown up in Henning. The family had Mandinka, other African, Cherokee, Scottish, and Scotch-Irish roots. The younger Haley always spoke proudly of his father and the obstacles of racism he had overcome.

Like his father, Alex Haley was enrolled at Alcorn State University, a historically black college in Mississippi and, a year later, enrolled at Elizabeth City State College, also historically black, in Elizabeth City, North Carolina. The following year, he withdrew from college. His father felt that Alex needed discipline and growth, and convinced him to enlist in the military. On May 24, 1939, Alex Haley began what was to become a 20-year career in the United States Coast Guard.

Haley traced back his maternal ancestry, through genealogical research, to Jufureh, in The Gambia.

== Coast Guard career ==
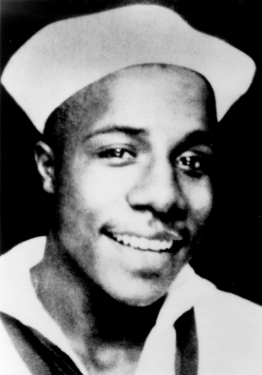
Haley during his service in the U.S. Coast Guard

Haley enlisted as a mess attendant. Later he was promoted to the rate of petty officer third-class in the rating of steward, one of the few ratings open to black personnel at that time. It was during his service in the Pacific theater of operations that Haley taught himself the craft of writing stories. During his enlistment other sailors often paid him to write love letters to their girlfriends. He said that the greatest enemy he and his crew faced during their long voyages was not the Japanese forces but rather boredom.

After World War II, Haley petitioned the U.S. Coast Guard to allow him to transfer into the field of journalism. By 1949 he had become a petty officer first-class in the rating of a journalist. He later advanced to chief petty officer and held this rank until his retirement from the Coast Guard in 1959. He was the first chief journalist in the Coast Guard, the rating having been expressly created for him in recognition of his literary ability.

Haley's awards and decorations from the Coast Guard include the Coast Guard Good Conduct Medal (6 awards represented by 1 silver and 1 bronze service star), American Defense Service Medal (with "Sea" clasp), American Campaign Medal, Asiatic-Pacific Campaign Medal, European-African-Middle Eastern Campaign Medal, World War II Victory Medal, Korean Service Medal, National Defense Service Medal, United Nations Service Medal, and the Coast Guard Expert Marksmanship Medal. The Republic of Korea awarded him the War Service Medal, ten years after he died. The United States Coast Guard dedicated the cutter formerly known as USS Edenton to Haley by recommissioning it as USCGC Alex Haley in July 1999. The cutter currently serves from Kodiak, Alaska.

== Literary career ==
After retiring from the U.S. Coast Guard, Haley began another phase of his career in journalism. He eventually became a senior editor for Reader's Digest magazine. Haley wrote an article for the magazine about his brother George's struggles to succeed as one of the first black students at a Southern law school.

=== Playboy magazine ===
Haley conducted the first interview for Playboy magazine. Haley elicited candid comments from jazz musician Miles Davis about his thoughts and feelings on racism in an interview he had started, but not finished, for Show Business Illustrated, another magazine created by Playboy founder Hugh Hefner that folded in early 1962. Haley completed the interview and it appeared in Playboy's September 1962 issue. That interview set the tone for what became a significant feature of the magazine. Rev. Martin Luther King Jr.'s Playboy Interview with Haley was the longest he ever granted to any publication.

Throughout the 1960s, Haley was responsible for some of the magazine's most notable interviews, including one with George Lincoln Rockwell, leader of the American Nazi Party. He agreed to meet with Haley only after gaining assurance from the writer that he was not Jewish. Haley remained professional during the interview, although Rockwell kept a handgun on the table throughout it. (The interview was recreated in Roots: The Next Generations, with James Earl Jones as Haley and Marlon Brando as Rockwell.) Haley also interviewed Muhammad Ali, who spoke about changing his name from Cassius Clay. Other interviews include Jack Ruby's defense attorney Melvin Belli, entertainer Sammy Davis Jr., football player Jim Brown, TV host Johnny Carson, and music producer Quincy Jones.

=== The Autobiography of Malcolm X ===
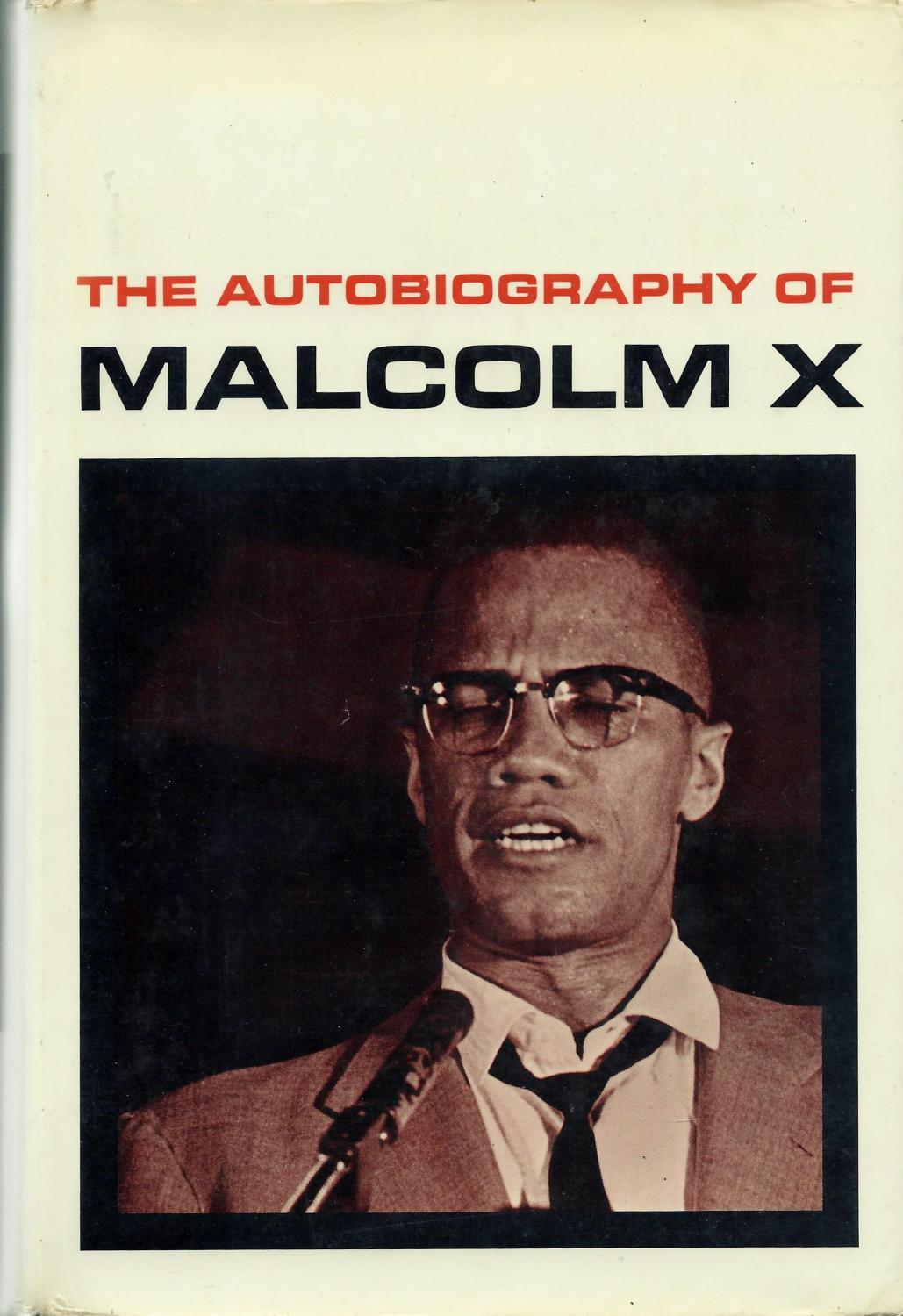
The Autobiography of Malcolm X, first edition (1965)

The Autobiography of Malcolm X, published in 1965, was Haley's first book. It describes the trajectory of Malcolm X's life from street criminal to national spokesman for the Nation of Islam to his conversion to Sunni Islam. It also outlines Malcolm X's philosophy of black pride, black nationalism, and pan-Africanism. Haley wrote an epilogue to the book summarizing the end of Malcolm X's life, including his assassination in New York's Audubon Ballroom.

Haley ghostwrote The Autobiography of Malcolm X based on more than 50 in-depth interviews he conducted with Malcolm X between 1963 and Malcolm X's February 1965 assassination. The two men had first met in 1960 when Haley wrote an article about the Nation of Islam for Reader's Digest. They met again when Haley interviewed Malcolm X for Playboy.

The initial interviews for the autobiography frustrated Haley. Rather than discussing his own life, Malcolm X spoke about Elijah Muhammad, the leader of the Nation of Islam; he became angry about Haley's reminders that the book was supposed to be about Malcolm X. After several meetings, Haley asked Malcolm X to tell him something about his mother. That question drew Malcolm X into recounting his life story.

The Autobiography of Malcolm X has been a consistent best-seller since its 1965 publication. The New York Times reported that six million copies of the book had sold by 1977. In 1998, Time magazine ranked The Autobiography of Malcolm X as one of the 10 most influential nonfiction books of the 20th century.

In 1966, Haley received the Anisfield-Wolf Book Award for The Autobiography of Malcolm X.

=== Super Fly T.N.T. ===
In 1973, Haley wrote his only screenplay, Super Fly T.N.T. The film starred and was directed by Ron O'Neal.

=== Roots ===
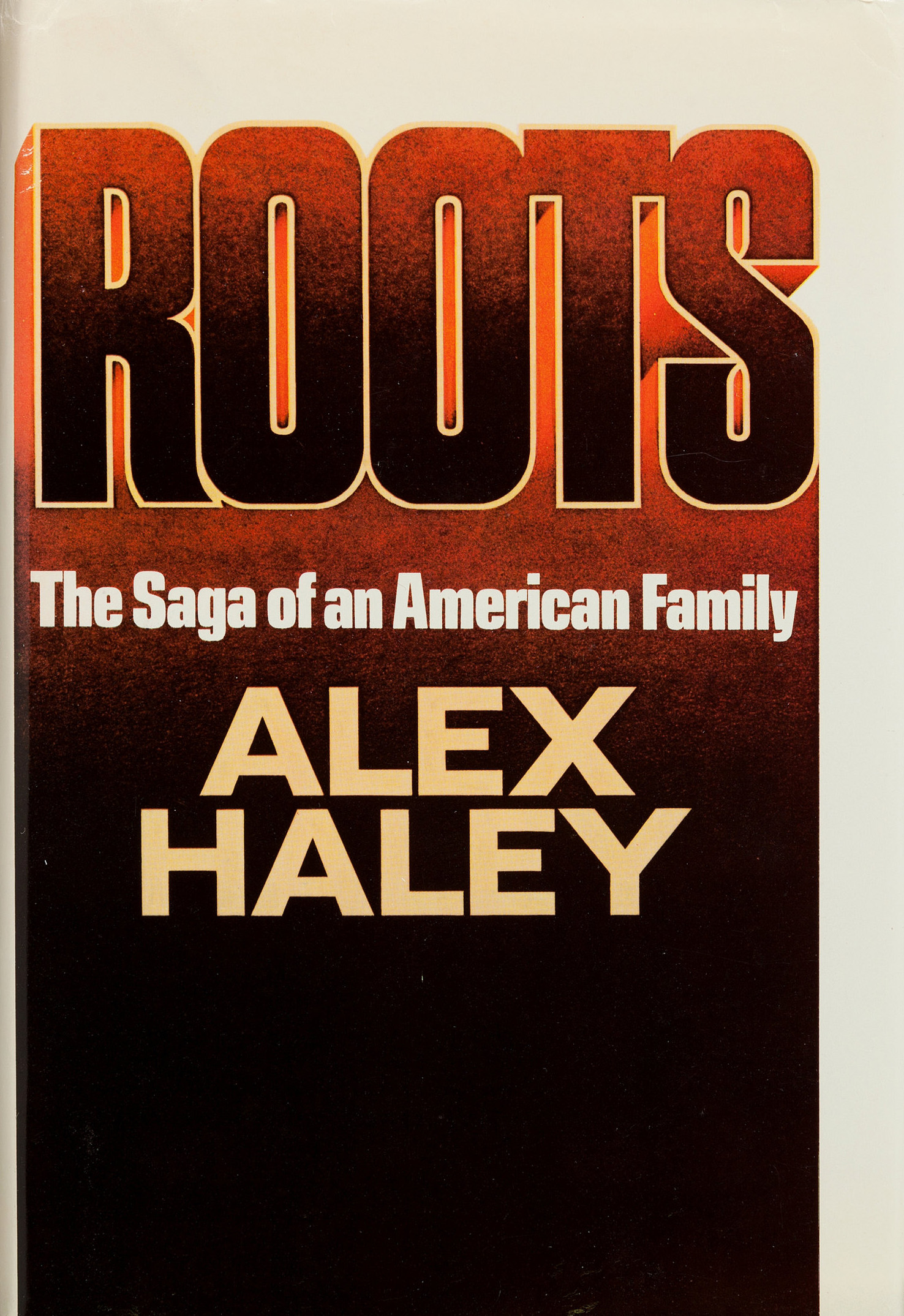
Roots: The Saga of an American Family, first edition (1976)

In 1976, Haley published Roots: The Saga of an American Family, a novel based on his family's history, going back to the time of slavery. It started with the story of Kunta Kinte, who was kidnapped in The Gambia in 1767 and transported to the Province of Maryland to be sold as a slave. Haley claimed to be a seventh-generation descendant of Kunta Kinte, and his work on the novel involved twelve years of research, intercontinental travel, and writing. He went to the village of Juffure, where Kunta Kinte grew up and listened to a tribal historian (griot) tell the story of Kinte's capture. Haley also traced the records of the ship, The Lord Ligonier, which he said carried his ancestor to the Americas.

Haley stated that the most emotional moment of his life occurred on September 29, 1967, when he stood at the site in Annapolis, Maryland, where his ancestor had arrived from Africa in chains exactly 200 years before. A memorial depicting Haley reading a story to young children gathered at his feet has since been erected in the center of Annapolis.

Roots was eventually published in 37 languages. Haley won a special Pulitzer Prize for the work in 1977. The same year, Roots was adapted as a popular television miniseries of the same name by ABC. The serial reached a record-breaking 130 million viewers. Roots emphasized that black Americans have a long history and that not all of that history is necessarily lost, as many believed. Its popularity also sparked a greatly increased public interest in genealogy.

In 1979, ABC aired the sequel miniseries, Roots: The Next Generations, which continued the story of Kunta Kinte's descendants. It concluded with Haley's travel to Juffure. Haley was portrayed at different ages by Kristoff St. John, The Jeffersons actor Damon Evans, and Tony Award winner James Earl Jones. In 2016, History aired a remake of the original miniseries. Haley appeared briefly, portrayed by Tony Award-winner Laurence Fishburne.

Haley was briefly a "writer in residence" at Hamilton College in Clinton, New York, where he began writing Roots. He enjoyed spending time at a local bistro called the Savoy in nearby Rome, where he would sometimes pass the time listening to the piano player. Today, there is a special table in honor of Haley at the Savoy, and a painting of Haley writing Roots on a yellow legal tablet.

=== Plagiarism lawsuits and other criticism ===
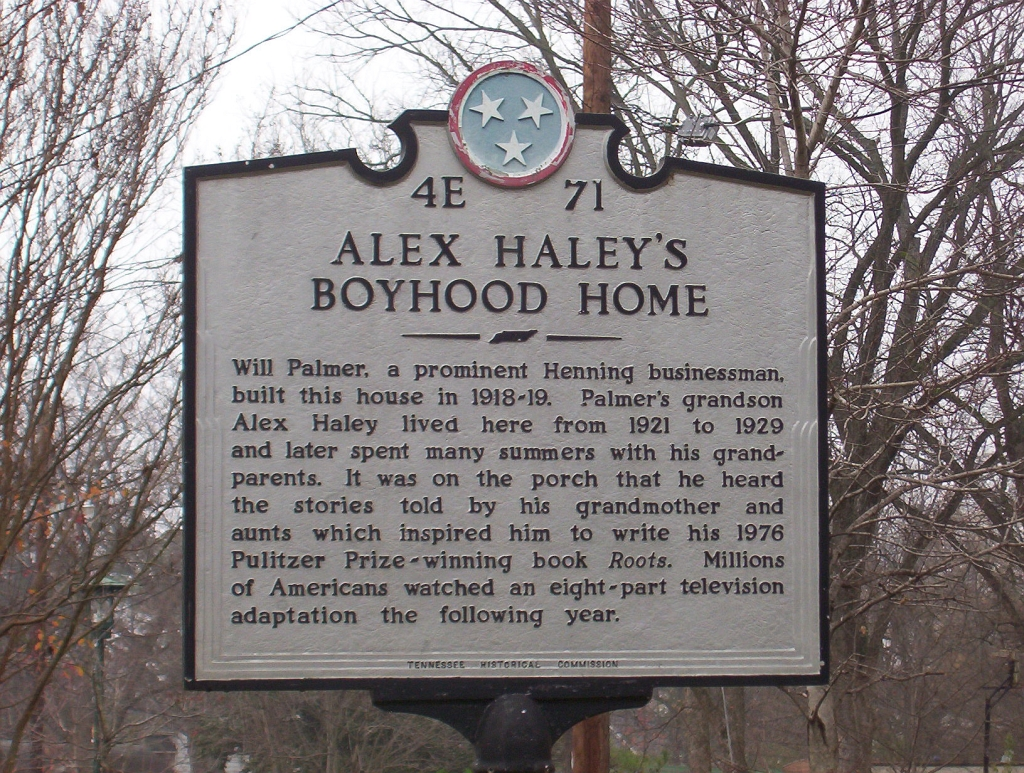
Historical marker in front of Haley's boyhood home at Henning, Tennessee, in 2007

Roots faced two lawsuits that charged plagiarism and copyright infringement. The lawsuit brought by Margaret Walker was dismissed, but Harold Courlander's suit was successful. Courlander's novel The African describes an African boy who is captured by slave traders, follows him across the Atlantic on a slave ship, and describes his attempts to hold on to his African traditions on a plantation in America. Haley admitted that some passages from The African had made it into Roots, settling the case out of court in 1978 and paying Courlander $650,000 (equivalent to $3,208,546 in 2025). In his biography of Haley, the academic Robert J. Norrell uses court transcripts and eyewitness testimony to show the judge in this trial, Nixon-appointee Robert Ward, not only lacked experience but was hostile to the defendant. According to an anonymous source, Judge Ward made it clear he thought Haley incapable of writing Roots at all.

Genealogists have also disputed Haley's research and conclusions in Roots. The Gambian griot turned out not to be a real griot, and the story of Kunta Kinte appears to have been a case of circular reporting, in which Haley's own words were repeated back to him. None of the written records in Virginia and North Carolina line up with the Roots story until after the Civil War. Some elements of Haley's family story can be found in the written records, but with a different genealogy than what he described in Roots.

Haley and his work have been excluded from the Norton Anthology of African-American Literature, despite his status as the United States' best-selling black author. Harvard University professor Henry Louis Gates Jr., one of the anthology's general editors, has denied that the controversies surrounding Haley's works are the reason for this exclusion. In 1998, Gates acknowledged the doubts surrounding Haley's claims about Roots, saying, "Most of us feel it's highly unlikely that Alex actually found the village whence his ancestors sprang. Roots is a work of the imagination rather than strict historical scholarship."

In 2023, Jonathan Eig suggested that Haley had made a number of fabrications in his 1965 Playboy interview with Martin Luther King Jr., including embellishing his criticisms of Malcolm X.

== Later life and death ==
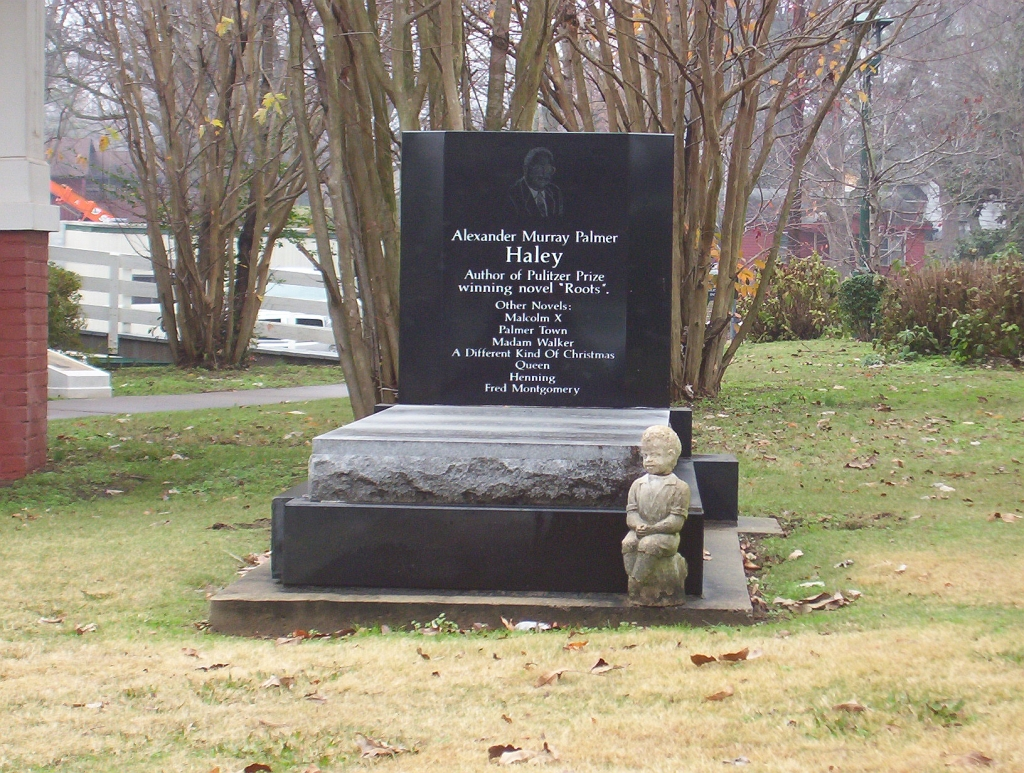
Haley's grave beside his boyhood home at Henning, Tennessee, in 2010

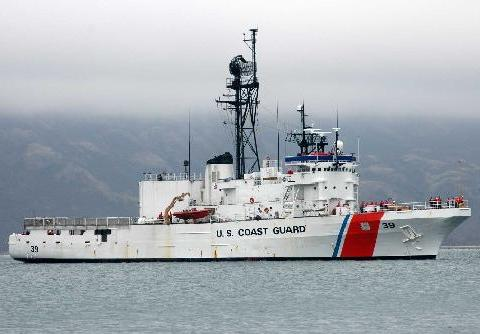
USCGC Alex Haley (WMEC-39)

Early in the 1980s, Haley worked with the Walt Disney Company to develop an Equatorial Africa pavilion for its Epcot Center theme park. Haley appeared on a CBS broadcast of Epcot Center's opening day celebration, discussing the plans and exhibiting concept art with host Danny Kaye. Ultimately, the pavilion was not built due to political and financial issues.

Late in the 1970s, Haley had begun working on a second historical novel based on another branch of his family, traced through his grandmother Queen; she was the daughter of a black slave woman and her white master.

He did not finish the novel before dying in Seattle, Washington, of a heart attack on February 10, 1992. He was buried beside his childhood home in Henning, Tennessee.

At his request, the novel was finished by David Stevens and was published as Alex Haley's Queen in 1993. Earlier the same year, it was adapted as a miniseries of the same name.

Late in Haley's life he had acquired a small farm in Clinton, Tennessee, although at the time it had a Norris, Tennessee address. The farm is a few miles from the Museum of Appalachia, and Haley lived there until his death. After he died, the property was sold to the Children's Defense Fund (CDF), which calls it the Alex Haley Farm. The nonprofit organization uses the farm as a national training center and retreat site. An abandoned barn on the farm property was rebuilt as a traditional cantilevered barn, using a design by architect Maya Lin. The building now serves as a library for the CDF.

== Awards and recognition ==
- In 1977, Haley earned a Pulitzer Prize Special Award for Roots ("Alex Haley, For Roots, the story of a black family from its origins in Africa through seven generations to the present day in America.")
- In 1977 Haley received the Spingarn Medal from the NAACP, for his exhaustive research and literary skill combined in Roots.
- In 1977, Haley received the Golden Plate Award of the American Academy of Achievement.
- The food-service building at the U.S. Coast Guard Training Center, Petaluma, California, was named Haley Hall in honor of the author.
- In 1999 the Coast Guard honored Haley by naming the cutter USCGC Alex Haley after him.
- The U.S. Coast Guard annually awards the Chief Journalist Alex Haley Award, which is named in honor of the writer as the Coast Guard's first chief journalist (the first Coast Guardsman in the rating of journalist to be advanced to the rate of chief petty officer). It rewards individual authors and photographers who have had articles or photographs communicating the Coast Guard story published in internal newsletters or external publications.
- In 2002 the Republic of Korea (South Korea) posthumously awarded Haley its Korean War Service Medal (created in 1951), which the U.S. government did not allow its service members to accept until 1999.

== Works ==
- The Autobiography of Malcolm X (1965), biography
- Super Fly T.N.T. (1973), screenplay
- Roots: The Saga of an American Family (1976), novel
- Alex Haley Tells the Story of His Search for Roots (1977) – 2-LP recording of a two-hour lecture
- Palmerstown, U.S.A. (1980–1981), TV series
- A Different Kind of Christmas (1988), stories
- Queen: The Story of an American Family (1992), novel
- Alex Haley: The Playboy Interviews (1993), collection
- Never Turn Back: Father Serra's Mission (Stories of America) (1993), editor, stories
- Mama Flora's Family (1998), novel

== Legacy ==
=== Collection of Alex Haley's personal works ===
The University of Tennessee Libraries Special Collections maintains a collection of Alex Haley's personal papers. The works contain notes, outlines, bibliographies, research, and legal papers documenting Haley's Roots through 1977. Of particular interest are the items showing Harold Courlander's lawsuit against Haley, Doubleday & Company, and various affiliated groups. Portions of Alex Haley's personal collection is also located at the African-American Research Library and Cultural Center at the Special Collections and Archives in Fort Lauderdale, Florida. The Keeper of the Word Foundation in Detroit, Michigan maintains Alex Haley's Coast Guard notes, writings, and love letter notes that developed Haley's writings. Along with the digital unpublished Autobiography of Malcolm X and Epilogue, omitted introduction and chapters, outline, letters, handwritten notes, Haley's complete interviews of Malcolm X's, poetry and edited notes, and digital rights.

=== Kunta Kinte-Alex Haley Memorial ===
In the city dock section of Annapolis, Maryland, there is a memorial to mark the arrival location of Kunta Kinte in 1767. The monument, dedicated on June 12, 2002, also celebrates the preservation of African-American heritage and family history.

=== Alex Haley Birthplace Memorial & Historical Marker ===
In May 1993, the Alex Haley Memorial Project in Ithaca, New York created a memorial pocket park at Alex Haley's birthplace in town, 212 Cascadilla Street; the park contains a carved granite marker and a hand-wrought iron bench with individual iron leaves made by community members. Funded by the Legacy Foundation of Tompkins County, the Alex Haley Memorial Project members also acquired a New York Historical Marker for the site, placed outside the 212 Cascadilla Street home in August 2020. Located nearby at 408 North Albany Street is the Alex Haley Municipal Pool, which also opened in 1993, immediately across the street from the Greater Ithaca Activities Center (GIAC), one of the area's prominent community centers.

== See also ==
- Alex Haley House and Museum
- Bibliography of Malcolm X
- Bibliography of Martin Luther King Jr.
