= Expansionist nationalism =

Nationalism that incorporates expansionism

Expansionist nationalism, is an aggressive radical form of nationalism or ethnic nationalism (ethnonationalism) that incorporates autonomous, heightened ethnic consciousness and patriotic sentiments with atavistic fears and hatreds focused on "other" or foreign peoples, framing a belief in expansion or recovery of formerly owned territories through militaristic means.

== History ==
The term was coined during the late nineteenth century as European powers indulged in the "Scramble for Africa" (1880s onwards), but has been most associated with authoritarian governments during the 20th century, including Fascist Italy, Nazi Germany, the Empire of Japan, and the Central and Eastern European countries of Albania (Greater Albania), Bulgaria (Greater Bulgaria), Croatia (Greater Croatia), Hungary (Greater Hungary), Poland (Greater Poland), Romania (Greater Romania) and Serbia (Greater Serbia), as well as Indonesia under Suharto (Greater Indonesia) and Cambodia's Khmer Rouge (Greater Cambodia) in Southeast Asia.

== Ideology ==
Expansionist nationalism is distinguished from liberal nationalism by its advocacy of chauvinism and racialism, its belief in the superiority of one's own nation and dominance combined with the exclusive right of self-determination. Nations are not considered equal with regard to their right of self-determination, rather some nations are believed to possess characteristics or qualities that make them superior to others. Expansionist nationalism therefore asserts the state's right to increase its borders at the expense of its neighbors.

== See also ==
- Akhand Bharat
- Generalplan Ost
- Greater Ukraine
- Irredentism
- Integral nationalism
- Jingoism
- Lebensraum
- Manifest Destiny
- Nazism
- Pan-Africanism
- Pan-Arabism
- Pan-Asianism
- Pan-Germanism
- Pan-Slavism
- Pan-Turkism
- Revisionist Zionism
