= Embassy of Poland, Lima =

Polish diplomatic mission to Peru, Bolivia and Ecuador

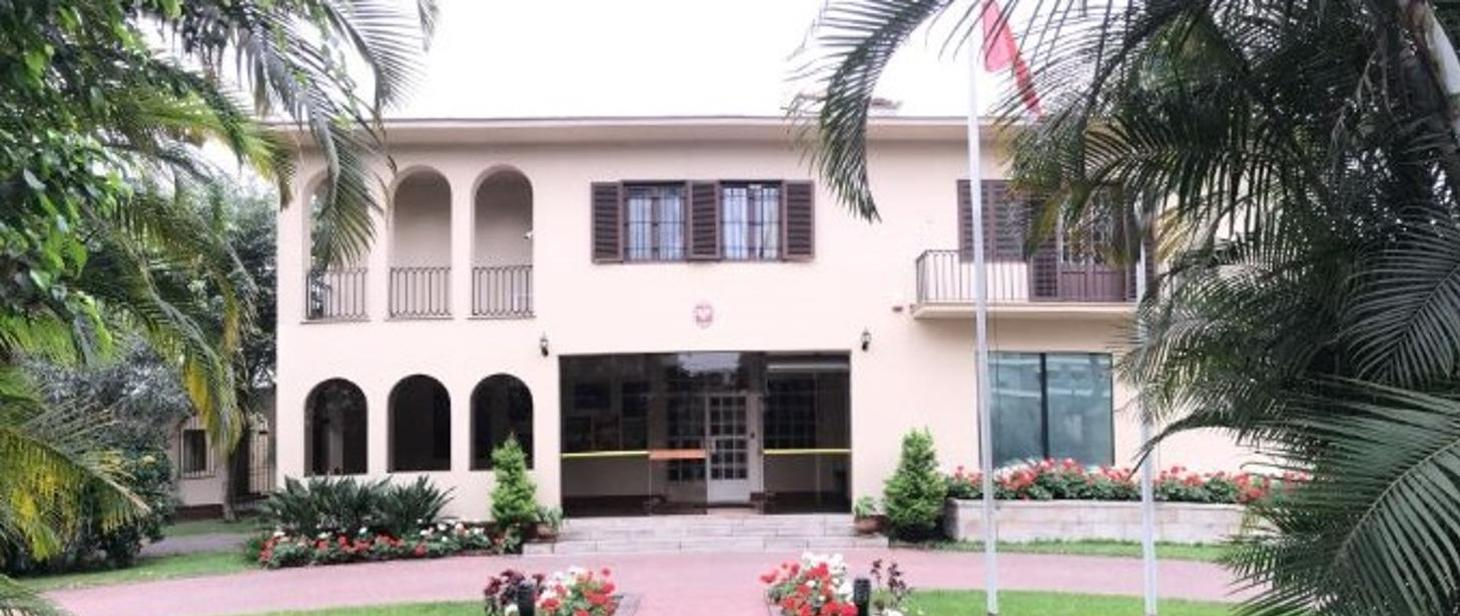
- Location: Jesús María District, Lima, Peru
- Address: Av. Salaverry 1978
- Opening: 1969
- Jurisdiction: Peru; Bolivia; Ecuador
- Website: Official website

The Embassy of Poland in Lima is the official diplomatic mission of Poland to the Republic of Peru. It is also accredited to neighbouring Bolivia and Ecuador.

Besides the embassy, Poland has six honorary consulates: in Peru (Arequipa and Callao), in Bolivia (La Paz and Santa Cruz) and in Ecuador (Quito and Guayaquil).

== History ==
Poland maintained diplomatic relations with Peru before World War II. From 1923, an honorary consulate operated in Trujillo and then in Lima. The first honorary consul was Stanislaw Madejewski. After establishing diplomatic relations in Peru, the Polish envoys in Buenos Aires were accredited. Peru withdrew its recognition of the Polish government in July 1945.

Consular relations were restored on August 22, 1967. The Consulate General of the Republic of Poland was opened in Lima on April 14, 1969, becoming an embassy on August 1 of the same year. Initially, the ambassador in Caracas was accredited to Peru. Polish ambassadors have been residing in Peru since 1973.

In December 1996, Polish chargé d'affaires Wojciech Tomaszewski found himself among the hostages of the radical left-wing terrorist guerrilla Túpac Amaru Revolutionary Movement (MRTA) at the Japanese ambassador's residence in Lima.

== List of representatives ==
Name	Portrait	Term begin	Term end	Head of state	Notes
Władysław Mazurkiewicz		1929	?	Ignacy Mościcki	Member of parliament.
Kazimierz Kurnikowski		March 1, 1937	?	Ignacy Mościcki	Member of parliament.
Oswald Kermenić		January 1, 1941	?	Władysław Raczkiewicz	Member of parliament.
Władysław Mazurkiewicz		April 1, 1942	?	Władysław Raczkiewicz	Member of parliament.
Oswald Kermenić		October 1, 1944	1945	Władysław Raczkiewicz	Member of parliament.
Peru severs relations with the Polish government-in-exile in July 1945; relations renewed with the Polish People's Republic in 1969
Witold Jurasz		July 2, 1969	?	Marian Spychalski	Resident in Caracas.
Marian Leśniewski		August 1, 1969	?	Marian Spychalski	As chargé d’affaires a. i.
Jerzy Linka		December 1, 1970	?	Marian Spychalski	As chargé d’affaires a. i.
Eugeniusz Szleper		January 24, 1973	?	Henryk Jabłoński	First resident ambassador in Lima.
Stanisław Jarząbek		January 29, 1976	1980	Henryk Jabłoński	Also accredited to Bolivia.
Edwin Wiśniewski		October 7, 1980	?	Henryk Jabłoński	
Bolesław Polak		December 7, 1982	1987	Henryk Jabłoński	
Bernard Bogdański		May 27, 1987	?	Wojciech Jaruzelski	
Tadeusz Mulicki		July 22, 1991	?	Lech Wałęsa	
Jarosław Spyra		September 29, 1993	?	Lech Wałęsa	As chargé d’affaires a. i.
Wojciech Tomaszewski		March 6, 1995	?	Lech Wałęsa	As chargé d’affaires a. i. until April 10, 1997.
Zdzisław Sośnicki		February 27, 2004	?	Aleksander Kwaśniewski	
Przemysław Marzec		April 11, 2006	?	Lech Kaczyński	Also accredited to Bolivia and Ecuador.
Jarosław Spyra		August 2010	November 27, 2010	Bronisław Komorowski	
Robert Krzyżanowski		November 2010	?	Bronisław Komorowski	As chargé d’affaires a.i.
Dariusz Latoszek		August 2012	?	Bronisław Komorowski	As chargé d’affaires a.i.
Izabela Matusz		January 24, 2013	December 2017	Bronisław Komorowski	
Magdalena Śniadecka-Kotarska		2018	May 2024	Andrzej Duda	
Anna Pieńkosz		2025		Andrzej Duda	

== See also ==
- Peru–Poland relations
- List of ambassadors of Peru to Poland
- Embassy of Peru, Warsaw
