= Peru–Poland relations =

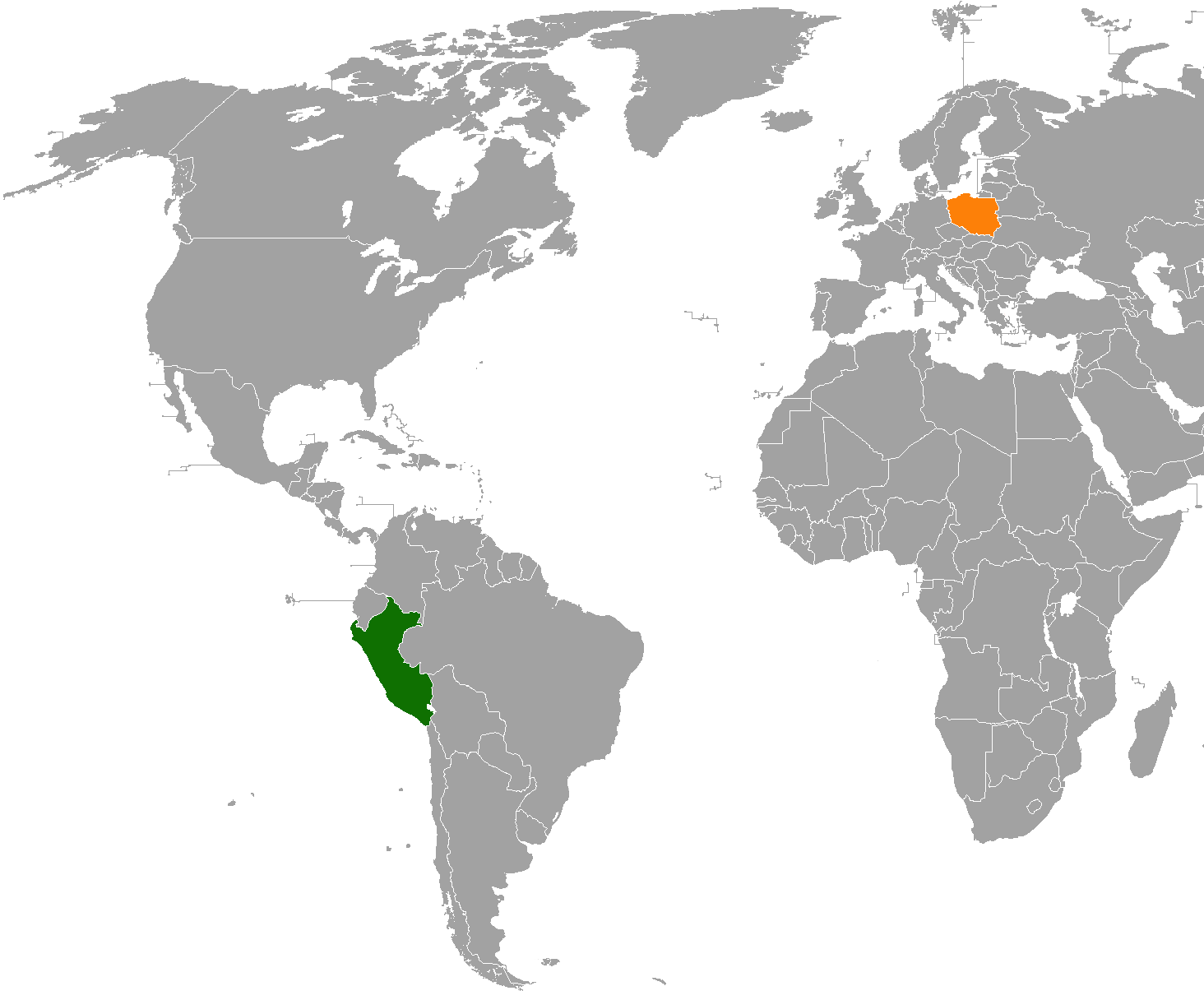
- Peru: Poland

Peru–Poland relations refers to the historical and bilateral relationship between the Republic of Peru and the Republic of Poland. Both nations are members of the World Trade Organization and the United Nations.

== History ==
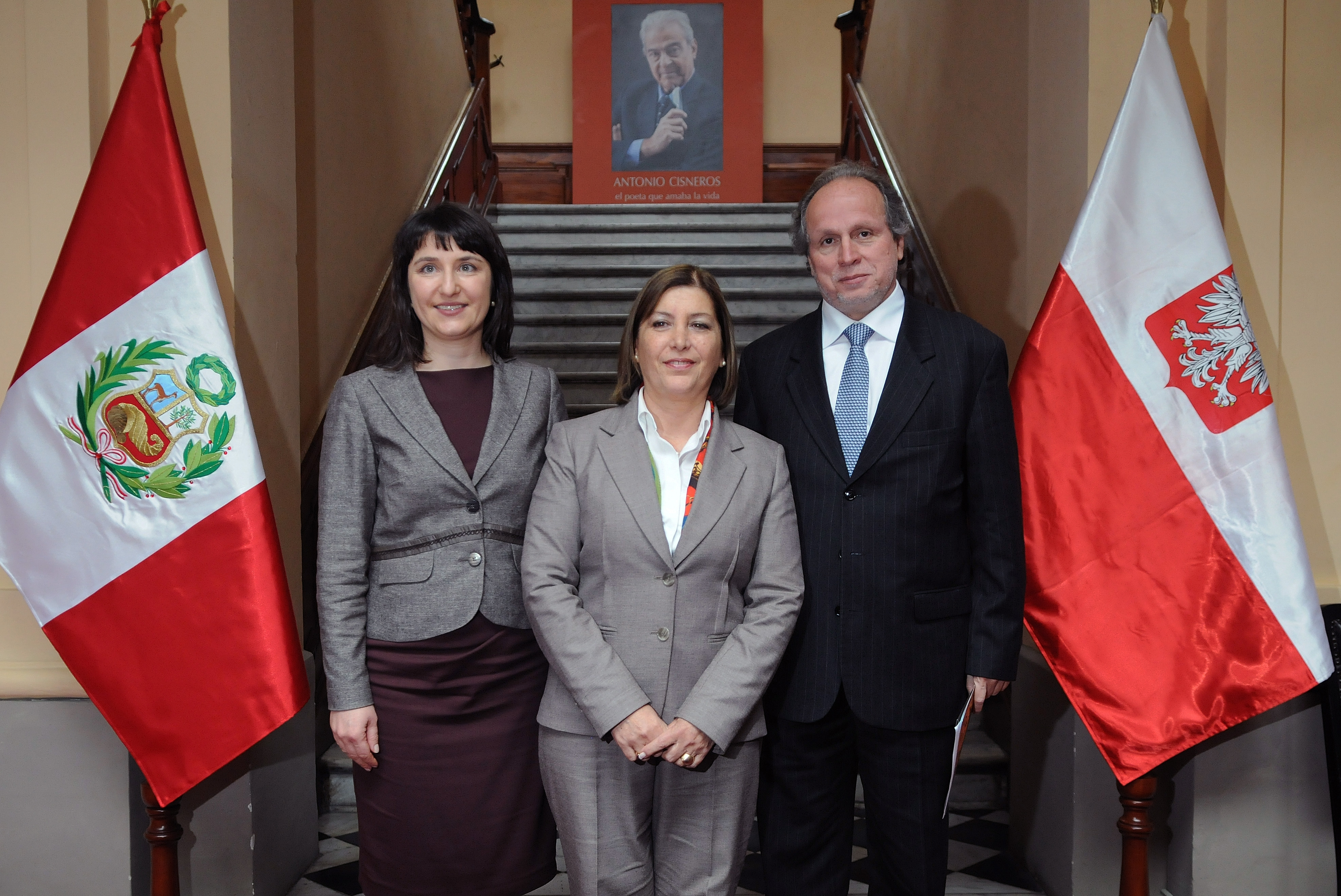
Commemorating 90 years of diplomatic relations between Peru and Poland, 2013.

Small amounts of Polish migrants emigrated to Peru who were promised land near the Ucayali River in the late 1800s. The most prominent Polish-Peruvian was Ernest Malinowski who is accredited for building the world's highest railway (Ferrocarril Central Andino) in the Peruvian Andes. He also fought for Peru in the Chincha Islands War against Spanish forces in 1866.

In 1921, Poland established an honorary consulate in Lima and in 1923 Peru opened an honorary consulate in Warsaw. In 1923, Peru and Poland officially established diplomatic relations. In 1967, Poland opened a Consulate-General in Lima. In 1969, the consulate-general was upgraded to an embassy. That same year, Peru opened its embassy in Warsaw.

In 1989, President Alan Garcia became the first Peruvian head of state to visit Poland. In 1998, Peruvian President Alberto Fujimori paid a visit to Poland. In 2002, President Aleksander Kwaśniewski paid a visit to Peru, becoming the first Polish head of state to do so. In 2007, former Polish President Lech Wałęsa also paid a visit to Peru. In May 2008, Prime Minister Donald Tusk paid an official visit to Peru. Former Peruvian President Pedro Pablo Kuczynski is of distant Polish descent.

Peru and Poland celebrated 100 years of diplomatic relations in 2023. For the occasion, the Polish Post released a commemorative postcard and stamp.

== High-level visits ==
High-level visits from Peru to Poland

- President Alan Garcia (1989)
- President of Congress Carlos Torres y Torres Lara (1996)
- President Alberto Fujimori (1998)
- Deputy Minister of Foreign Affairs Ignacio Higueras (2023)

High-level visits from Poland to Peru

- Marshal of the Senate of Poland Alicja Grześkowiak (1998)
- President Aleksander Kwaśniewski (2002)
- Prime Minister Donald Tusk (2008)

== Bilateral agreements ==
Both nations have signed several bilateral agreements such as an Agreement on Trade (1968); Agreement on Tourism (2008), Agreement on Scientific and Cultural Cooperation (2008) and an Agreement on the Transfer of Prisoners (2014). There are also cooperation agreements between some Peruvian and Polish universities.

== Trade ==
In 2018, trade between Peru and Poland totaled US$201 million. Peruvian exports to Poland mainly consist of fruits and fish products. Polish exports to Peru include: electrical devices, motor vehicles, light bulbs, dairy products, petroleum oils, tractors, electrical wires and machines for the food industry.

In the post-pandemic era, trade between the two nations have continued to grow and it totaled US$266 million in 2022.

== Resident diplomatic missions ==
- Peru has an embassy in Warsaw.
- Poland has an embassy in Lima.
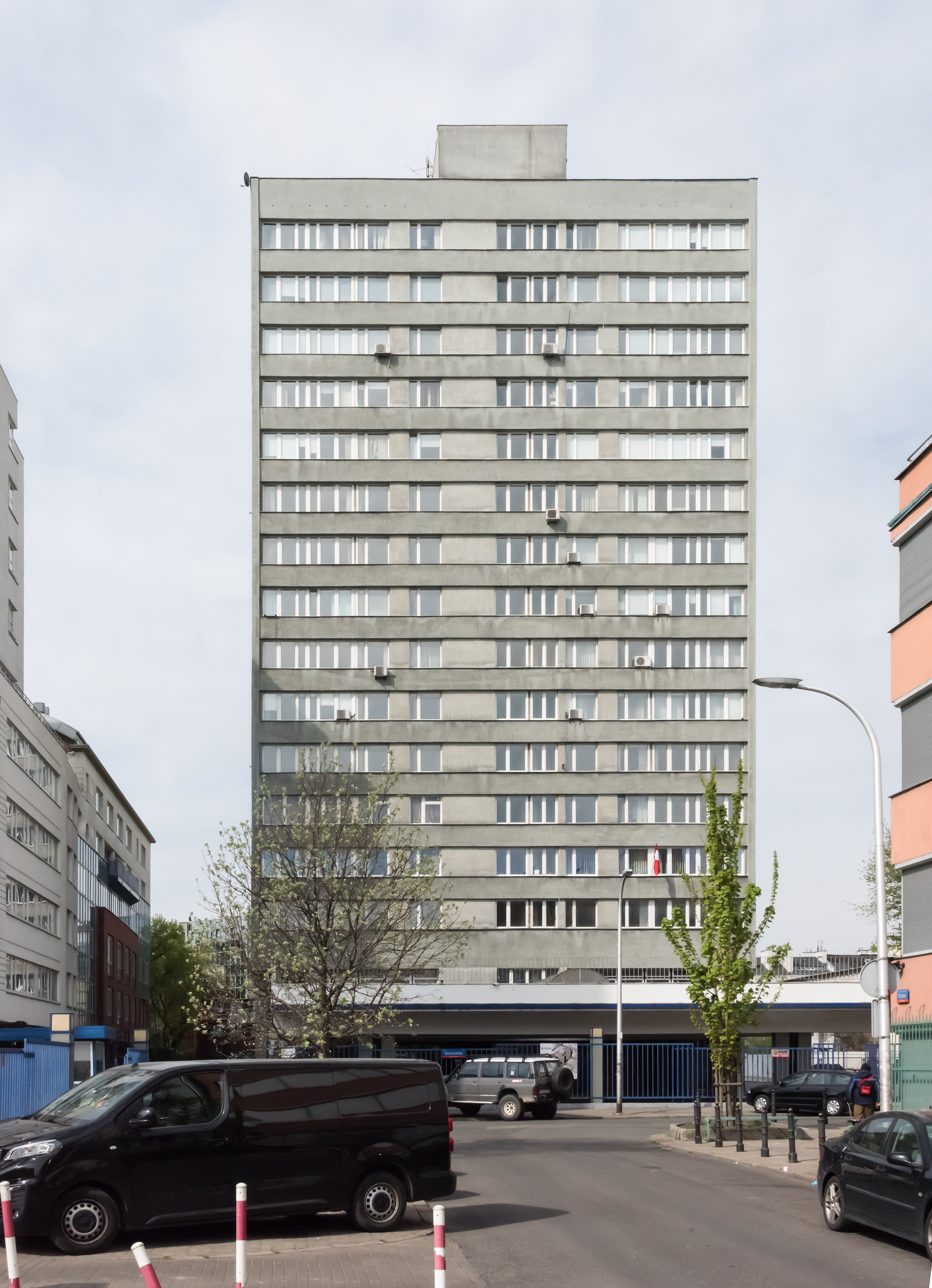
Building hosting the embassy of Peru in Warsaw

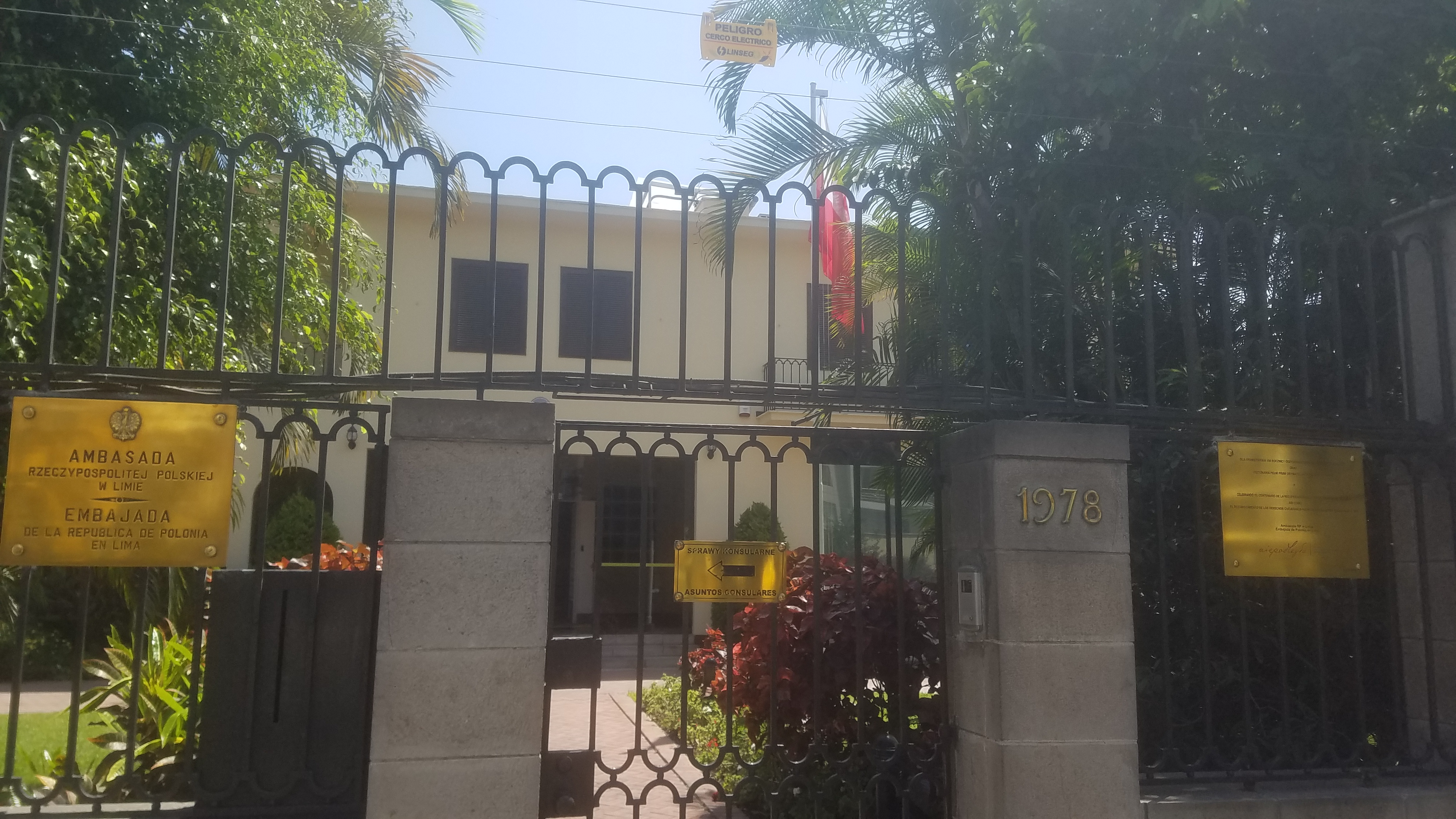
Embassy of Poland in Lima

== See also ==
- Foreign relations of Peru
- Foreign relations of Poland
- Polish Peruvians
- Colonization attempts by Poland
- List of ambassadors of Peru to Poland
- List of ambassadors of Poland to Peru
