= Embassy of Peru, Warsaw =

Embassy of Peru in Warsaw
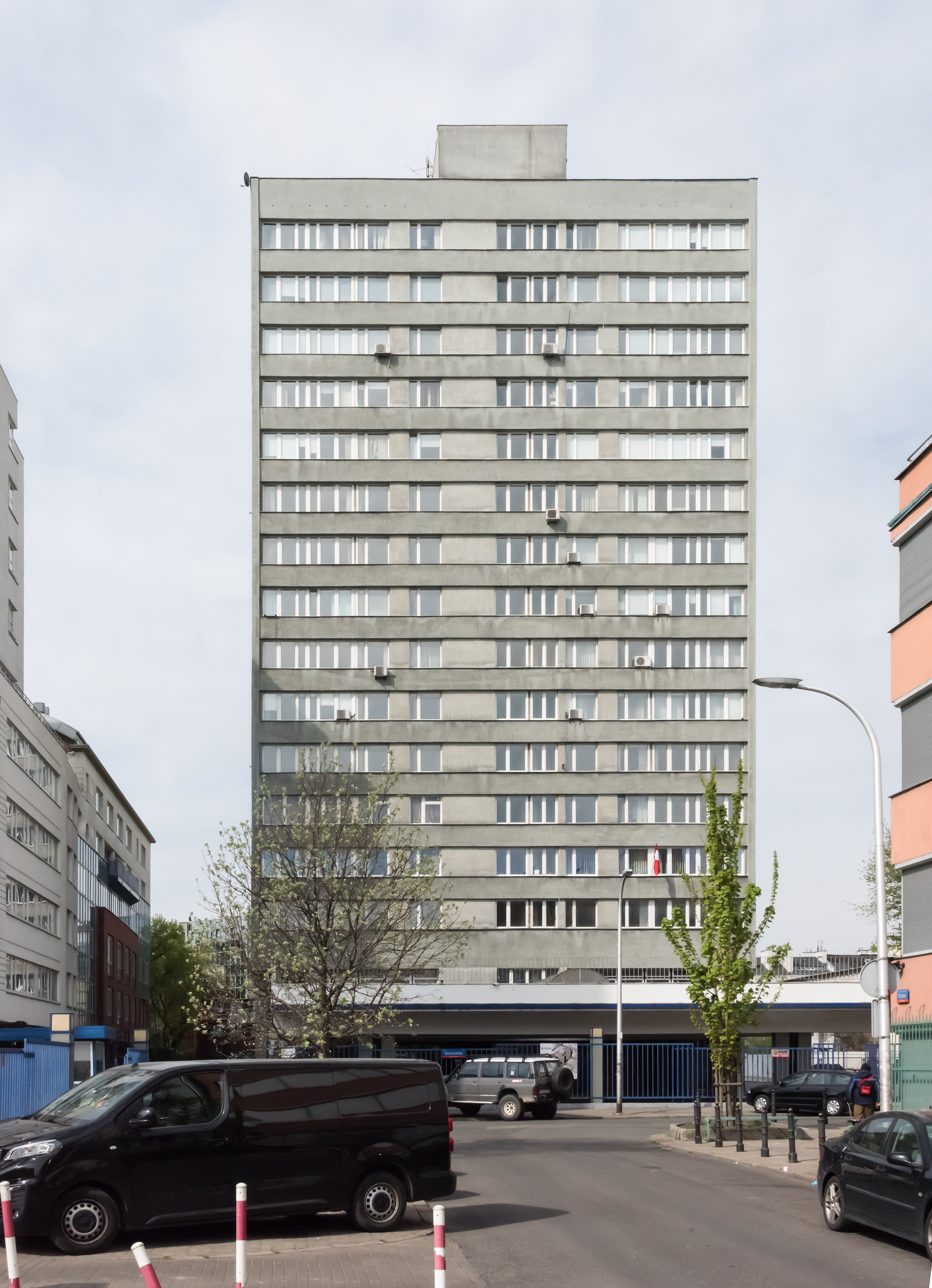
- Address: Starościńskiej 1
- Ambassador: Hubert Wieland Conroy
- Jurisdiction: Poland; Ukraine
- Website: Embassy of Peru in Poland

The Embassy of Peru in Warsaw (Polish: Ambasada Peru w Warszawie; Spanish: Embajada del Peru en Polonia) is the foremost diplomatic mission of Peru in Poland. The current ambassador is Hubert Wieland Conroy. The Peruvian Ambassador in Warsaw is also accredited in Ukraine.

== Organizational division ==
The embassy is divided into:

- Secretariat (Spanish: Secretariado)
- Consular and Cultural Section (Spanish: Sección Consular y Cultural)
- Commercial and Political Section (Spanish: Sección Comercial y Política)
- Administration and Finance (Spanish: Administración y Finanzas)

== History ==
Before World War I, Peru maintained a consulate in Warsaw, which was located at 13 Miodowa St. (1876–1878), 31 Miodowa St. (1879–1880), in the building of the Russian Capital and Income Insurance Company / Life Insurance Company at 11 Miodowa St. (1881–1887) and in the Pac Palace at 15 Miodowa St. (1888–1897).

Peru and Poland established official consular relations in 1921 and diplomatic relations in 1923. From 1928, Peru's legation abroad was accredited in Warsaw.

In 1969, Peru reestablished its diplomatic relations with Poland, opening an embassy in Warsaw, which was located at the Hotel Bristol at Krakowskie Przedmieście 42-44 (1971), 9 Wrońskiego St. (1971–1977), 25 Felińskiego St. (1978-1993) and 1 Starościńska street (1996–).

== See also ==
- Embassy of Poland, Lima
- Peru–Poland relations

== Bibliography ==
- Stosunki dyplomatyczne Polski. Informator. Tom II. Ameryka Północna i Południowa 1918-2007, Ministerstwo Spraw Zagranicznych, Archiwum/Wydawnictwo Askon, Warszawa 2008, s. 224, ISBN 978-83-7452-026-3
