= Joanna Kozińska-Frybes =

Polish diplomat (born 1959)

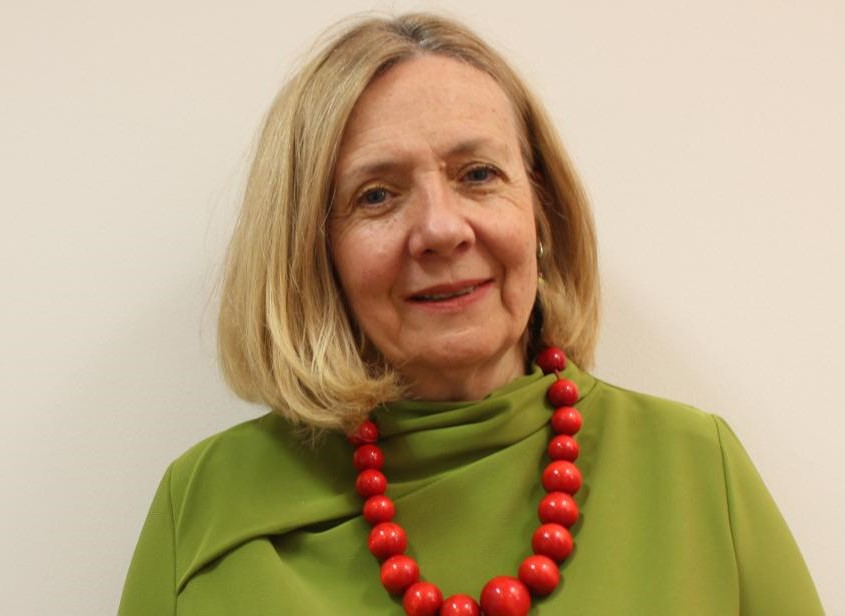

Poland Ambassador to Mexico
- In office 1993–1999
- Preceded by: Irena Gabor-Jatczak
- Succeeded by: Gabriel Beszłej

Poland Ambassador to Cuba
- In office 2023–2026
- Preceded by: Anna Pieńkosz

Personal details
- Born: 1959 (age 66–67) Warsaw
- Spouse: Marcin Frybes
- Children: 1
- Education: University of Warsaw
- Profession: Diplomat

Joanna Krystyna Kozińska-Frybes (born 1959 in Warsaw) is a Polish civil servant and diplomat. She served as an ambassador to Cuba (2023–2026). Prior to that, she was an Ambassador to Mexico (1993–1999) and the Consul-General in Barcelona (2002–2006), Los Angeles (2009–2013), and Lyon (2016–2020).

== Life ==
In 1985, Kozińska-Frybes graduated in Hispanic Studies at the University of Warsaw. In 1980s, she was an active participant of an independent anti-communist student movement. Because of the dissident activity of her husband, Marcin Frybes, in 1985, both of them were forced to leave Poland and move to France. She continued there her studies on history of Latin America at the Sorbonne Nouvelle University Paris 3 where she received a DEA degree. She carried out her research in France, Spain, Mexico, Guatemala, and Peru.

In 1992, following her return to Poland, she joined the Ministry of Foreign Affairs. Since 2008, she held the rank of titular ambassador (highest in the Polish diplomatic service). At first, she served as the Polish Secretary General of the Polish National Commission for UNESCO. In 1993, she was nominated Ambassador to Mexico. She ended her term in 1999. Next, she was holding the post of the director of the MFA Department for Cultural and Scientific Co-operation (1999–2002), Consul-General in Barcelona (2002–2006), deputy director of the Consular Department (2006–2009), Consul-General in Los Angeles (2009–2013), deputy director of the MFA Department for Cooperation with Polish Diaspora and Poles Abroad (2013–2016), and Consul-General in Lyon (2016–2020). Following her return to Poland on 1 October 2020, she was deputy director of the MFA Political Director's Office and, again, of the MFA Department for Cooperation with Polish Diaspora and Poles Abroad. On 9 March 2023, Kozińska-Frybes was nominated Poland ambassador to Cuba. She began her term on 10 August 2023, and ended in 2026.

== Languages spoken ==
Besides Polish and Spanish, Kozińska-Frybes speaks English and has basic proficiency in both Portuguese and Russian.

== Honours ==
- Silver Cross of Merit, Poland (2005)
- Decoration of Honor Meritorious for Polish Culture, Poland
