= Magdalena Śniadecka-Kotarska =

Polish, professor, ethno-political researcher and diplomat

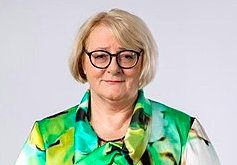
- Born: Antonina Magdalena Śniadecka; June 13, 1952 (age 74)
- Education: University of Łódź
- Occupations: Researcher; Diplomat
- Title: Polish Ambassador to Peru, Bolivia and Ecuador
- Term: March 2018-May 2024
- Predecessor: Izabela Matusz
- Successor: Anna Pieńkosz
- Awards: Gold Cross of Merit; Medal for Long Service

Magdalena Śniadecka-Kotarska is the Polish Ambassador to Peru, Bolivia and Ecuador. She is an ethnologist/anthropologist of culture and politics, conducting field research in Andean America devoted to ethnopolitics, native populations and gender identity.

== Research interests ==
Śniadecka-Kotarska specializes in ethno-political research of the Andean region (Peru, Ecuador, Bolivia) and the Mesoamerican region (borderland between Mexico and Guatemala). Śniadecka-Kotarska explores conflicts among native populations, and the mechanisms of ethno-development from top-down and bottom-up perspectives (emic/etic) on the micro and macro scales. She was the first academic in Poland in the 1990s to research narco-culture, narco-violence, narco-terror, and different diversifications of sex identity among Indian and Mestizo women.

== Academic career ==
Śniadecka-Kotarska graduated from the Faculty of Philosophy and History of the University of Łódź (1983), and for 12 years worked in the Ethnography Department of the faculty. Since 1995 she has been an employee and co-founder of the Institute of International Relations (currently the Faculty of International and Political Studies of the University of Łódź). Simultaneously, she was bound by a fixed contract with the Centre for Latin-American Studies of the University of Warsaw [Pol. CESLA]. She was granted her PhD at the University of Łódź in 1990, her postdoctoral degree at Adam Mickiewicz University in 2004, her Associate Professor degree at the University of Warsaw in 2005, and a year later at the University of Łódź. In 2015 she received her Titular Professor degree from the President of Poland. In the years 1997-2016 she was a member of the Team for the Culture of Both Americas at the Institute of Ethnology and Cultural Anthropology of Adam Mickiewicz University in Poznań.

Since 2002 she has been the head and founder of the Lab, Institute, and subsequently the Department of Latin American and Comparative Studies of the University of Łódź.

== Scientific achievements ==
In the years 1993-2016 she undertook 60 field research projects in Latin America on the aforementioned issues. The projects were conducted within 11 grants financed by: the State Committee for Scientific Research, the Ministry of Science and Higher Education, the National Science Centre, and the EC (in eight of them she was the leader). Between 2010 and 2014 she was also the Polish coordinator of the prestigious MISEAL project (Medidadas para la Inclusión Social y Equidad en Instituciones de Educación Superior en América Latina) of the EU programme ALFA III, which joins together scientific units from 12 Lain American and 4 European countries (Germany, Spain, Great Britain and Poland).

Corollaries to the field research projects were: participation in over 100 international congresses and conferences (including the recurring: the International Congress of Americanists [ICA], the International Union of Anthropological and Ethnological Sciences [IUAES], Consejo Europeo de Investigaciones sobre América Latina [CEISAL; European Council on Studies of Latin America], the Latin America Studies Association [LASA]), authorship of 8 monographs and 90 articles published in specialist scientific journals in Polish, Spanish and English.

== Memberships of scientific associations ==
Śniadecka-Kotarska is a member of 14 Polish and foreign scientific associations (for years she was the president or the deputy president of PTSL – the Polish Association of Latin American Studies), such as: LASA, CIESAL, Consejo Latinoamericano de Ciencias Sociales [CLACSO], Women in Spanish, Portuguese and Latin American Studies [WISPS], the Society for Latin American Studies[SLAS], ALACID, IUAES. She is also a member of 8 editorial councils of Latin American, foreign and domestic periodicals.

== Teaching ==
As a teacher, for 30 years she has taught classes in Polish and Spanish in the ethnology/anthropology of politics and international relations, as well as cultural studies of Ibero-America. She was the first in Poland in 1995 (first at the University of Warsaw, then at the University of Łódź) to hold lectures, innovative at the time, on: anthropology of Latin American women, narco-violence, socio-cultural and political conflicts, contexts for breaking human rights resulting from different concepts and means of conducting ethno-politics, ethno-development, politics against the narco-trade and cultural sex identity in multi-ethnic countries.

Śniadecka-Kotarska created an interdisciplinary team of Latin Americanists from her own students at the University of Łódź, which had had no prior traditions within the studies on Latin America. In 2015 the team was incorporated into the Latin American Council of Social Studies network as the 481st research and didactics unit in the world, and the very first in Poland. She was also an initiator of the Centre of Latin American Conflicts founded at the Faculty of International and Political Studies in 2013.

She is the author of five specializations at the faculty (Ibero-American Specialization, Estudios Latinoamericanos, Cultura, Sociedad y Politica, Interamerican, International Journalism) and a co-author of the programme in International Cultural Studies. She has supervised 223 Latin Americanists, 8 doctoral candidates (currently she supervises 4 more), 110 MA candidates (including 55 at the University of Warsaw), 90 BA candidates and 15 post-graduate papers.

== Awards and prizes ==
The Golden Cross of Merit was bestowed on her by the president of Poland in 2005 for research in the Andean region, and in 2015 for the Medal for Long Service. In 2013 she received the Margherita von Bretano Prize at the Free University of Berlin for research on Indian feminism. Multiple times she received Rector's Prizes at the University of Łódź and the University of Warsaw. In 2018 she was awarded the title VIP graduate of the University of Łódź.

In 2017 she was nominated by the President of Poland, Andrzej Duda, for the position of Ambassador Plenipotentiary and Extraordinary of Poland in Peru, Bolivia and Ecuador. She began her term in March 2018, and ended in May 2024.
