= Polish Peruvians =

Polacy w Peru (Polish) Polaco-peruanos (Spanish)
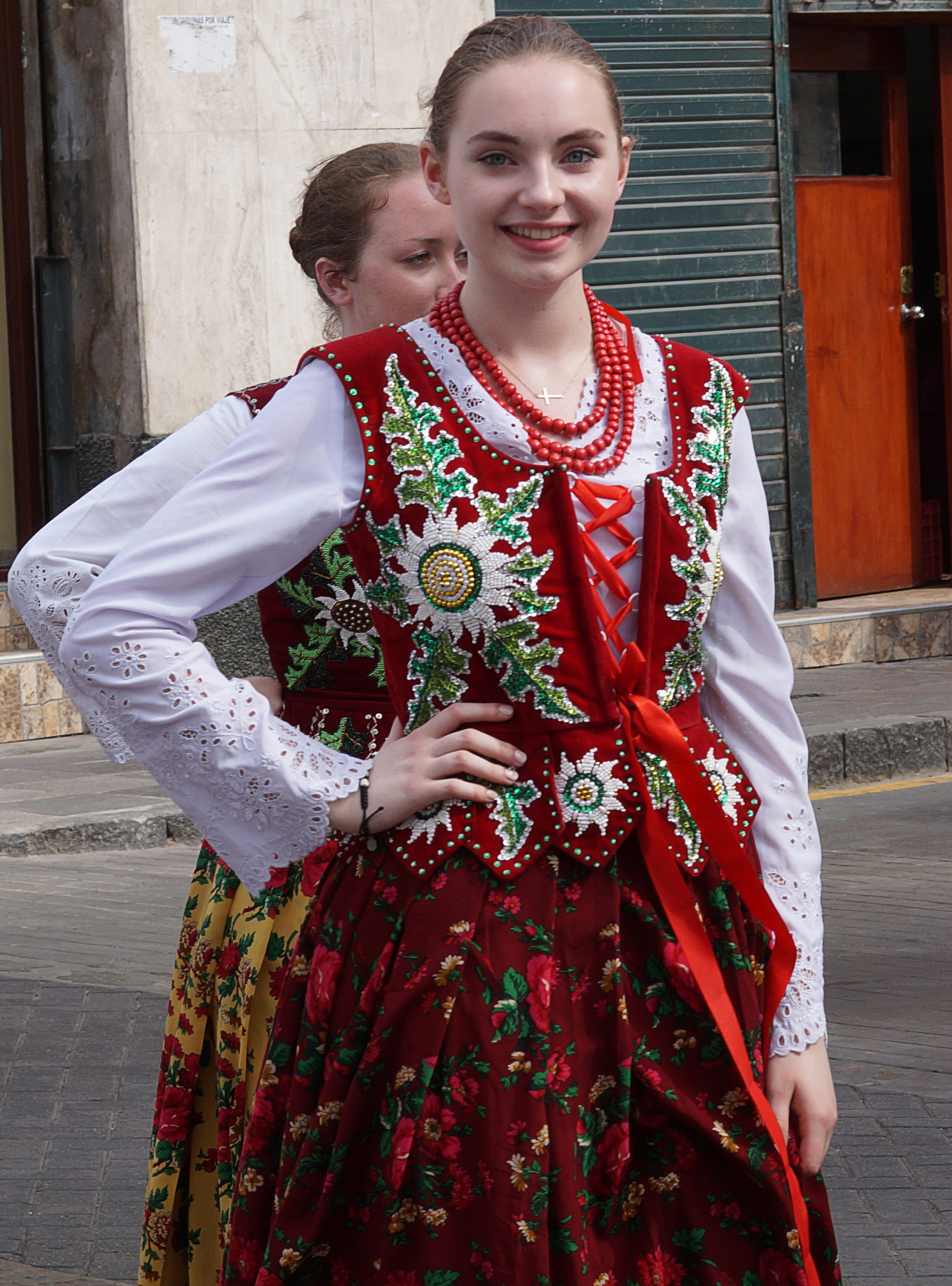
- Polish girls during festivities in Lima

Total population
- 5,000 (2007)

Languages
- Peruvian Spanish · Polish

Religion
- Christianity (Predominantly Roman Catholicism) · Judaism

Polish Peruvians (Polish: Polacy w Peru, Spanish: Polaco-peruanos) are Peruvian-born citizens who are of fully or partially of Polish descent, whose ancestors were Poles who emigrated to Peru as part of the Polish diaspora or Polish-born people in Peru.

== History ==
Most Poles arrived to Peru during the 19th century, as part of the Great Emigration. Another large wave took place in the Interwar period, as well as during and after World War II.

In January 1928, a Polish expedition headed for the area of the Ucayali River, to check possibilities of creation of settlements for farmers on several thousand hectares of rainforest. Soon afterward, the first settlers arrived in Peru, but because of the Great Crisis, the government in Warsaw ceased to fund the action. Private donations were insufficient, furthermore, the first settlers discovered the local condition to be much worse than advertised. In 1933, the contract with the Peruvians was terminated, and to avoid international scandal, all settlers returned to Poland.

== Notable people ==
- Edward Jan Habich, engineer and mathematician
- Fernando de Szyszlo, formar diplomat and painter
- Maxime Hans Kuczyński, German-born Jewish scientist
- Pedro Pablo Kuczynski, son of the above and one-time President of Peru
- Ricardo de Jaxa Malachowski, architect and member of the Malachowski noble family
- María Rostworowski, historian and member of the Rostworowski aristocratic family
- Zbigniew Strzałkowski and Michał Tomaszek, Conventual Franciscan priests who were murdered by the Shining Path in 1991

== See also ==
- Peru–Poland relations
- Immigration to Peru
- History of the Jews in Peru
