= Czechoslovak Togo =

Proposed Czechoslovak colony in Africa

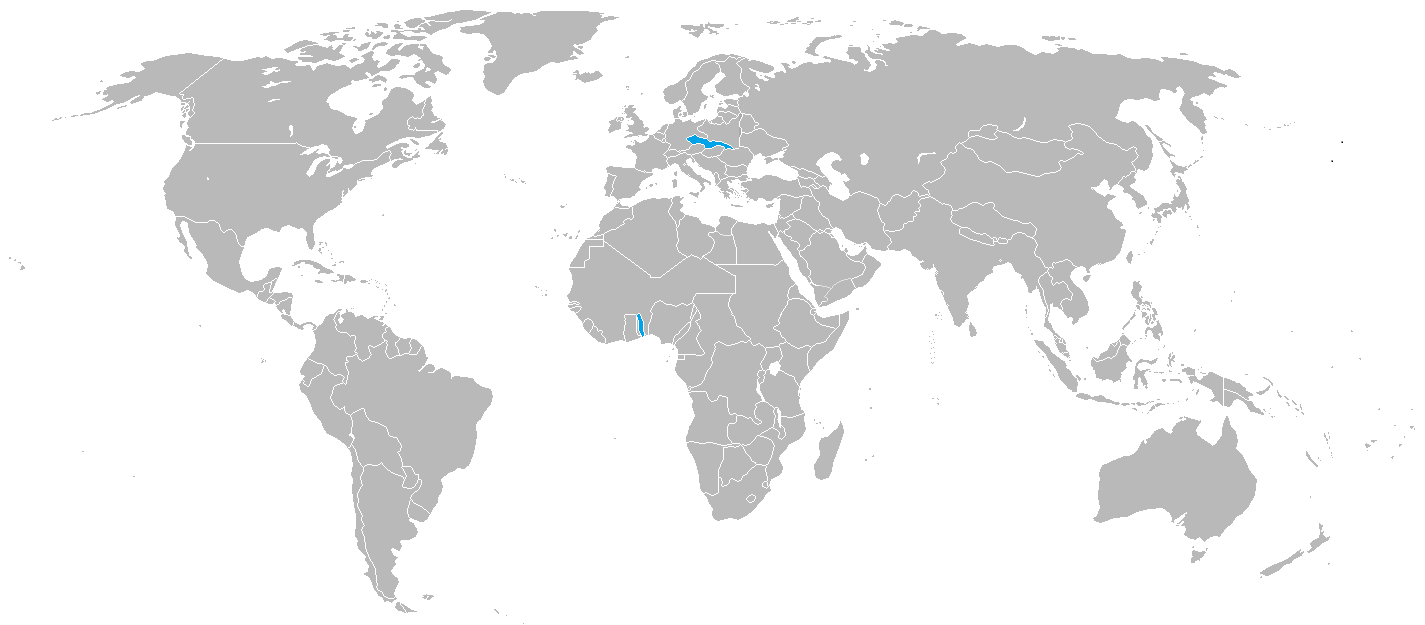
Czechoslovakia and Togo on the post-war world map

Czechoslovak Togo (Czech: Československé Togo; Slovak: Československé Togo) was a proposed Czechoslovak colony in West Africa. The author of this idea is considered to be the Czech adventurer Jan Havlasa, but sometimes also the Czech orientalist Alois Musil or Emil Holub. However, official documents did not mention in any way the possibility that the Togo region would fall under the administration of the newly established Czechoslovakia, so the idea of a Czechoslovak overseas territory is seen only as a kind of "wish" of some inhabitants rather than a historical fact. Post-World War I German Togoland was instead divided between France and the United Kingdom.

== History ==
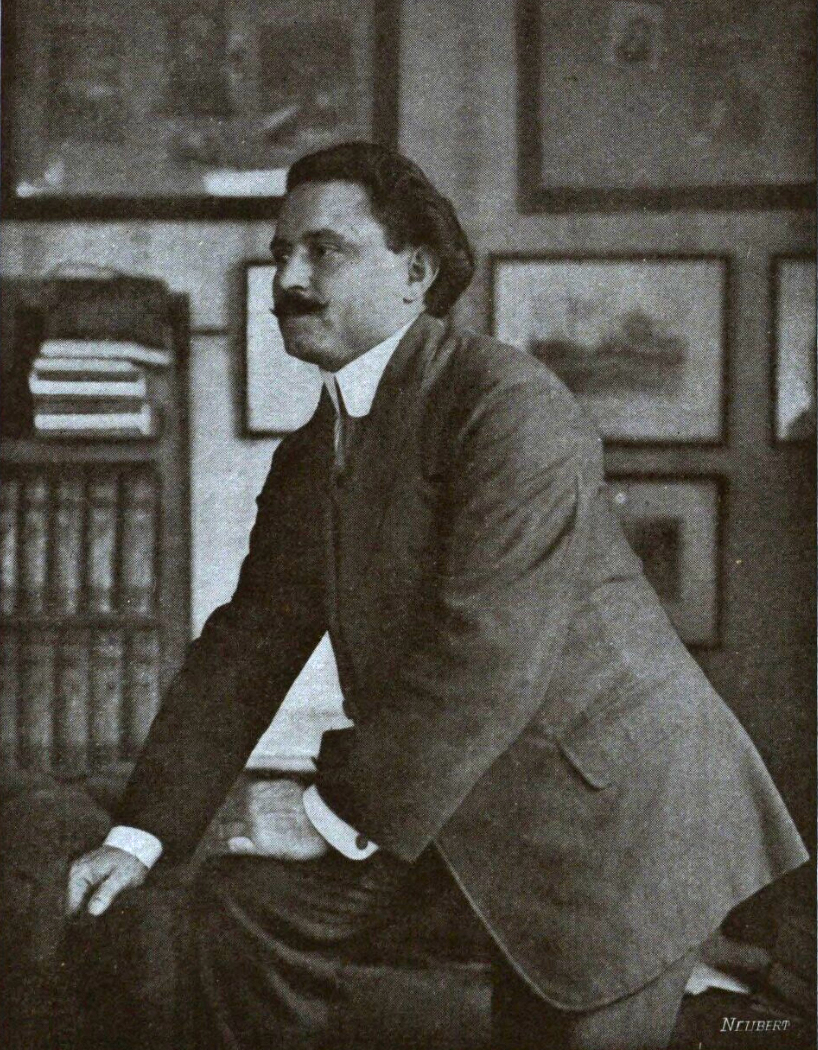
Jan Havlasa also had the idea that Czechoslovakia could participate in the colonization of New Guinea

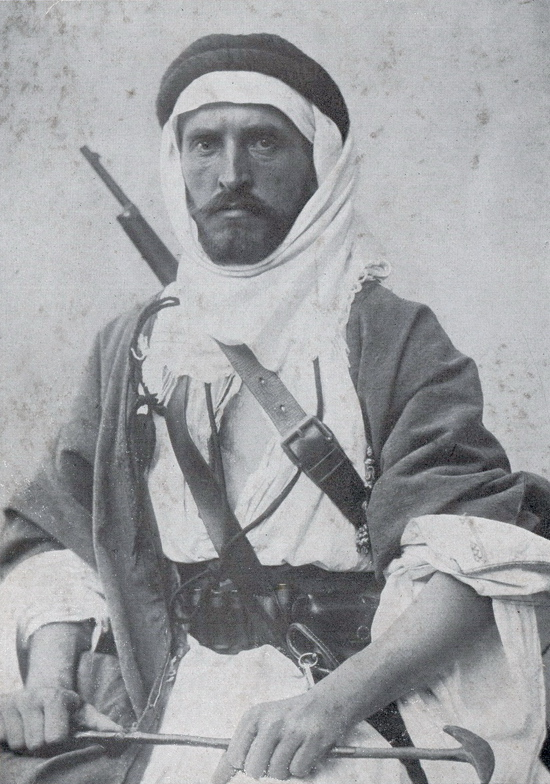
Alois Musil, together with Jan Havlasa, was one of the main promoters of the Czechoslovak government becoming active in overseas politics

The idea of establishing a Czechoslovak colony came closest after the end of the First World War, when the Paris Peace Conference with the defeated Germany was taking place. Here it was decided, among other things, that the German Empire would be stripped of its overseas territories, which included today's Togo, then known as Togoland. In 1919 Havlasa published a booklet called Czech Overseas Colonies (Czech: České kolonie zámořské) in which he identified Togo as the most suitable territory for colonisation. One of the reasons why this particular area was to become a Czechoslovak colony was that the Togolese population in the former German colony in 1912 numbered slightly over a million and the area occupied roughly two thirds of Czechoslovakia (to give an idea, the area of Czechoslovakia was 140,446 km^{2} at the time of its creation, while Togoland had an area of 90,400 km^{2}). It was therefore thought that the Czechoslovak authorities would have no problem with administering the territory. This was to be achieved with the help of the experienced Czechoslovak legions returning from Siberia across the Pacific Ocean and on across the Atlantic, while Togo still had a partial colonial administration and order left over from the Germans, which was familiar to the Czechs, who had lived in the German area for several centuries. There were over 60,000 Czechoslovak legionnaires in transit at the time.

== Possible administration ==
If Togo had indeed become a colony of Czechoslovakia at that time, it was believed that iron ore and other goods such as cocoa, coffee, millet and leather could be imported from there to the Czechoslovak port in Germany, which seemed to be a great benefit for Czechoslovak factories. Some travellers, such as Vilém Němec, had the idea that large companies such as Škoda or ČKD could become involved in the colony and build their factories there, thus making use of the local labour force. Other proponents of the idea envisaged that the local population would be educated with the help of Czech teachers, similar to what had been done in Zakarpattia. In Togo, Czechoslovaks would also encounter diseases typical of the African continent, such as sleeping sickness, yellow fever and malaria, to a greater extent for the first time.

== German postage stamps ==
There are cases when overprints of Č.S.P. appeared on German colonial stamps from Togo. The origin of this modification is unknown, it could have been a private modification (Č.S.P. as an abbreviation for Czechoslovak Post) by an unknown author on some of the surplus German stamps.

== See also ==
- Colonization attempts by Poland
