= Polish irredentism =

Polish nationalist ideology

Map depicting Poland with control of the modern western border and the interwar Kresy.

Polish irredentism or Greater Poland is a term applied to certain currents within Polish nationalism. In one sense, it refers to the territorial scope of the Poles, emphasising the ethnicity of those Poles living outside Poland. In the political sense, though, the term refers to an irredentist belief in the equivalence between the territorial scope of the Polish people and that of the Polish state.

== Historical background ==
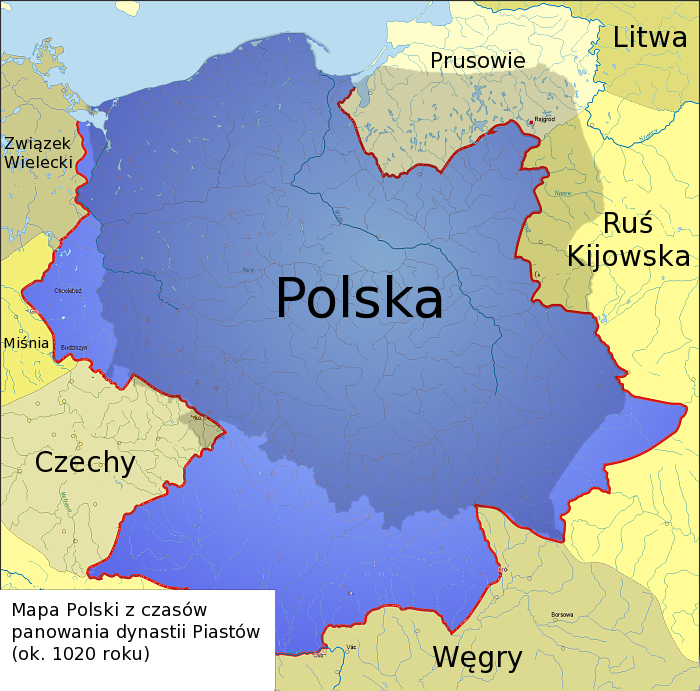
Map of Poland from the early 11th century shows Polish lands separated by Old Prussian and Kiev Russian territories

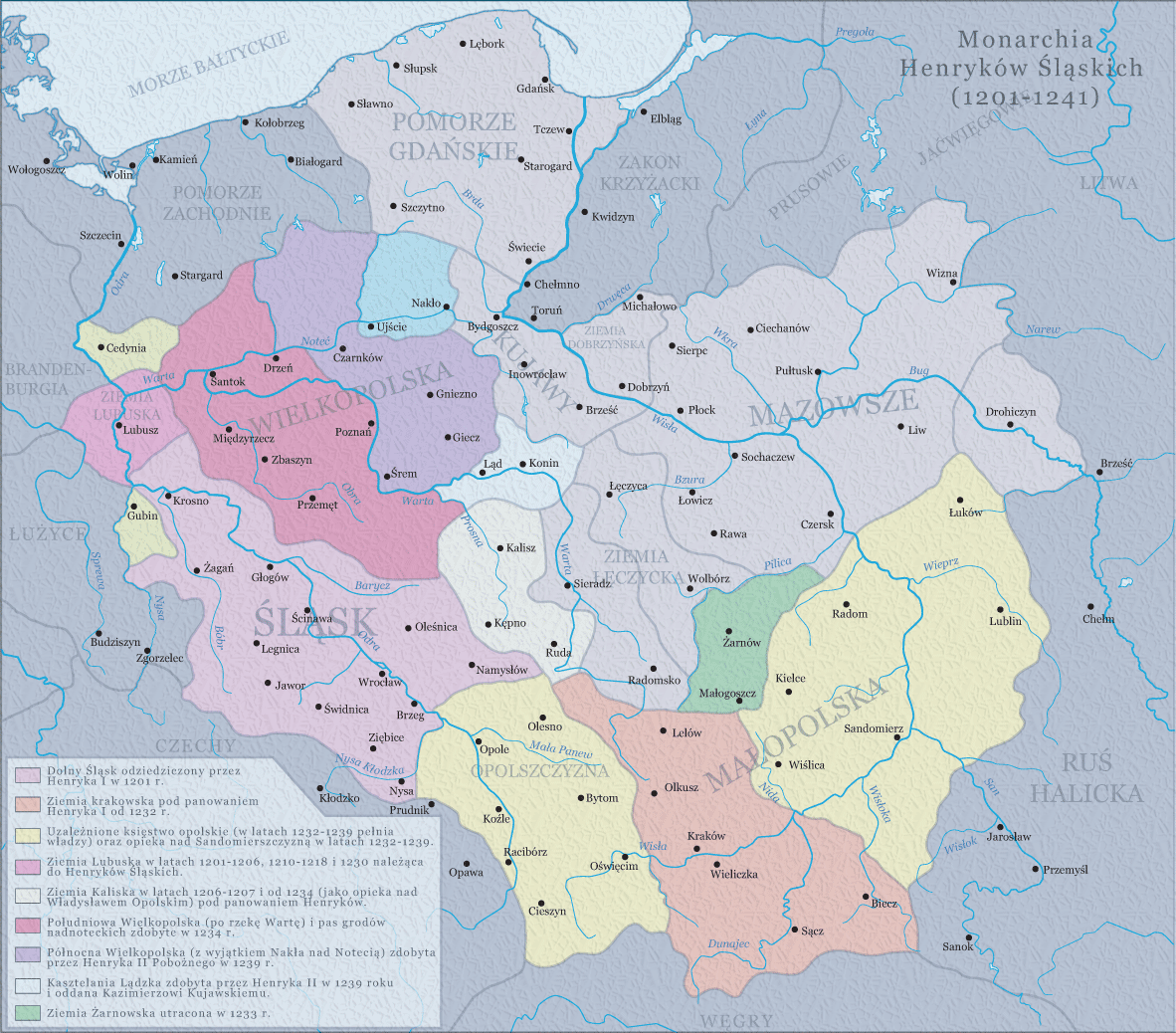
Map of Poland in the first half of the 13th century

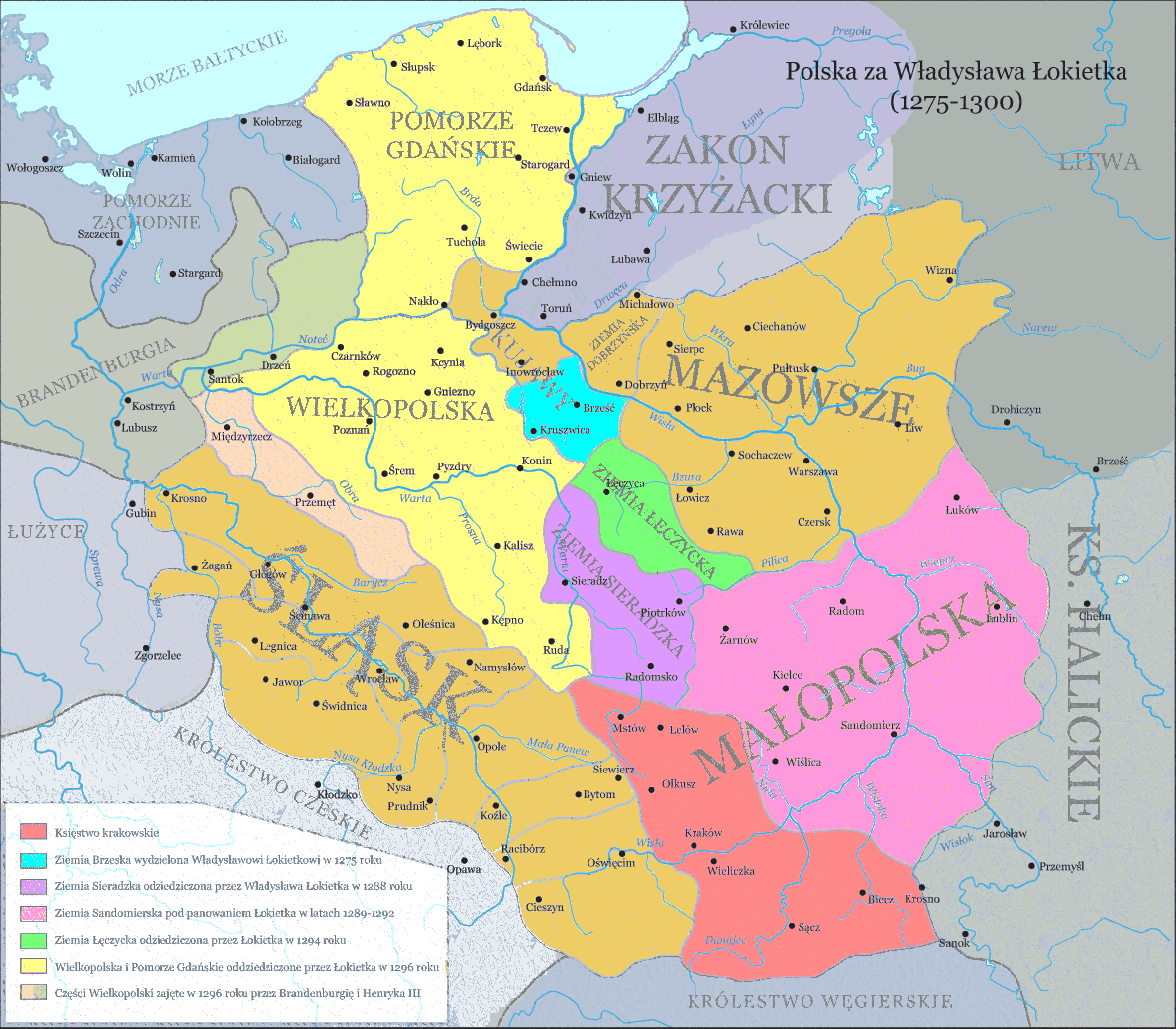
Map of Poland with visible Polish-Lithuanian border

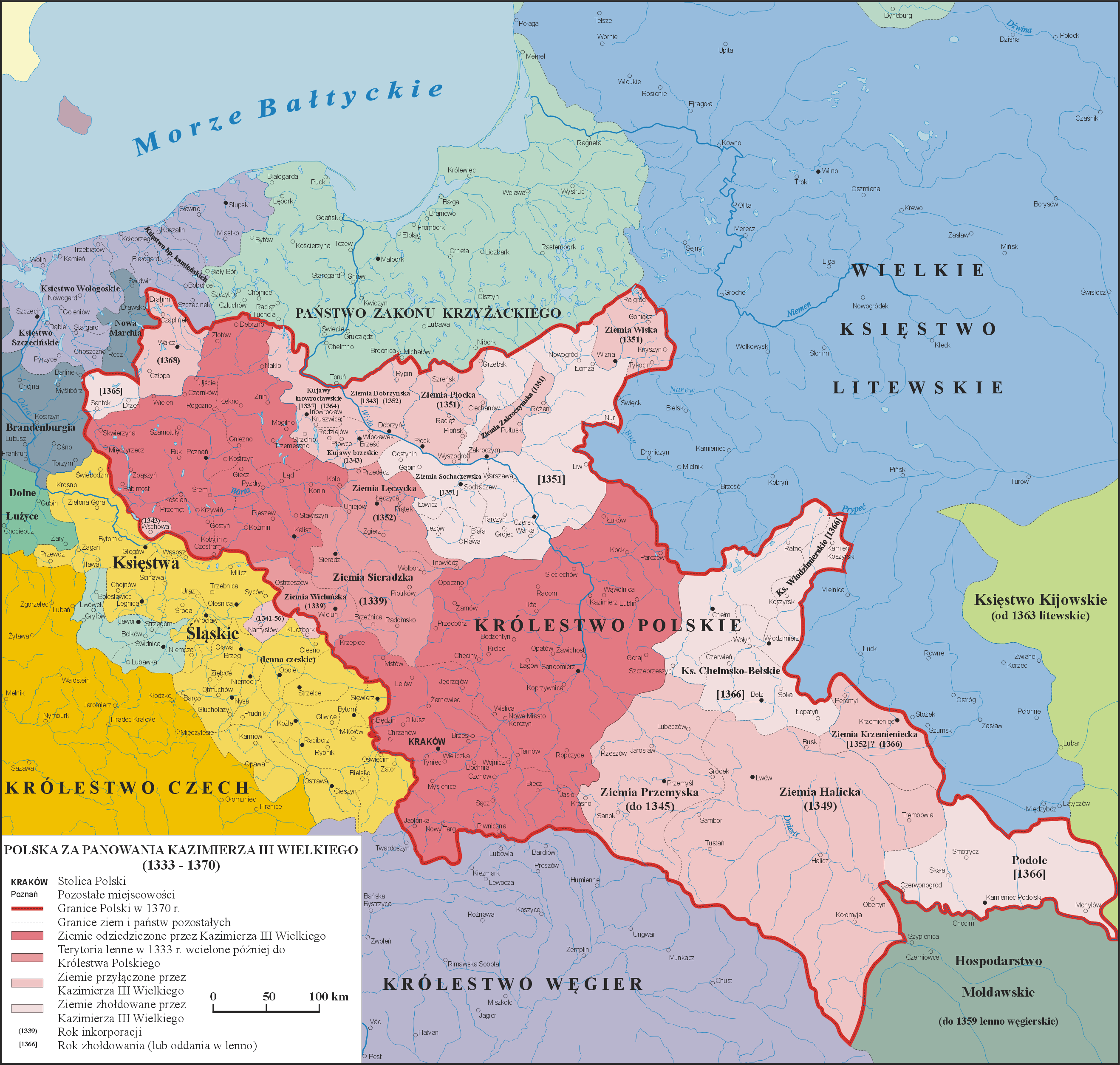
Map of Poland around 1333–1370, in pink

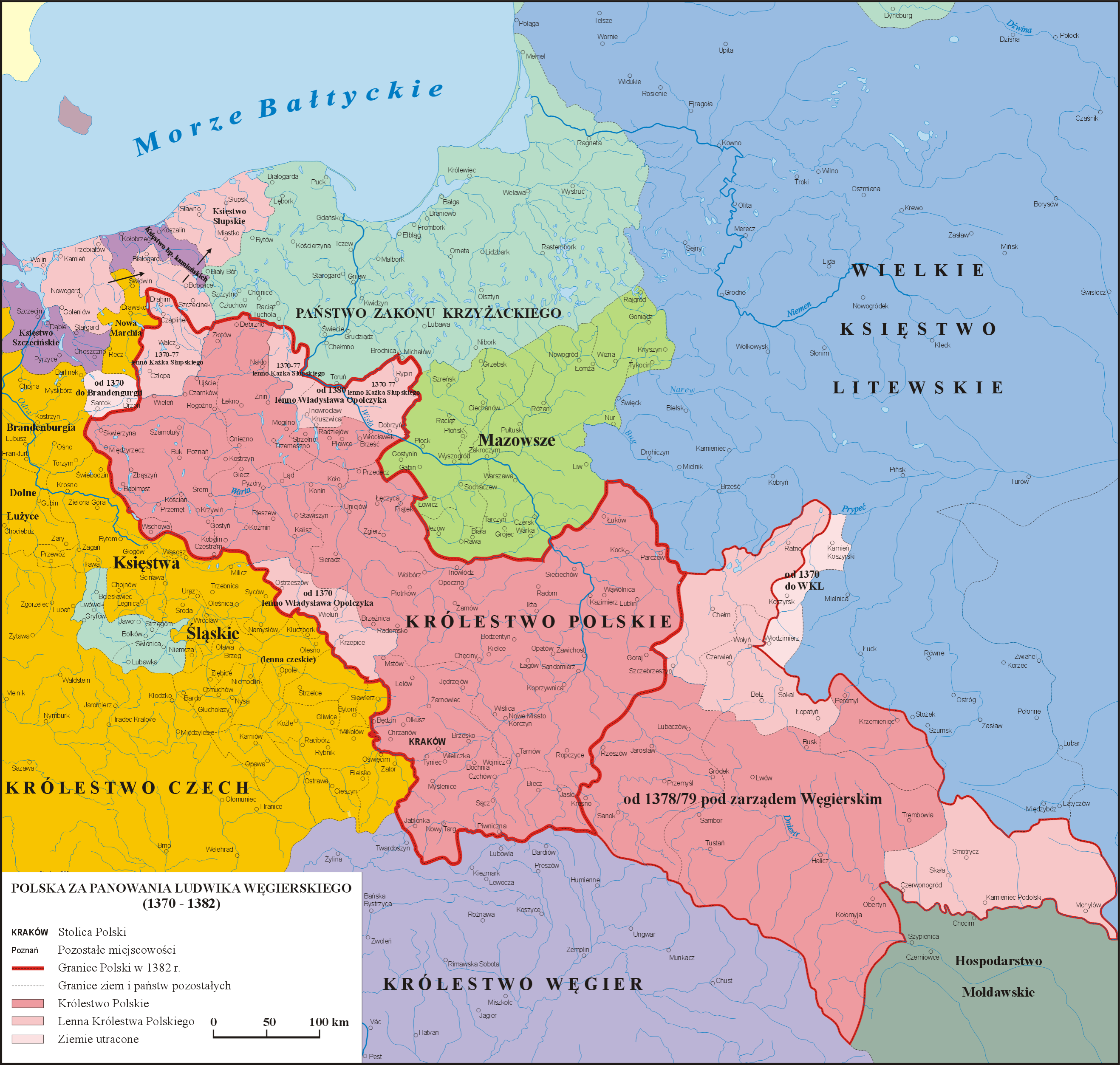
Map of Poland around 1370–1382, in pink

Map of Poland around 1386–1434, in pink

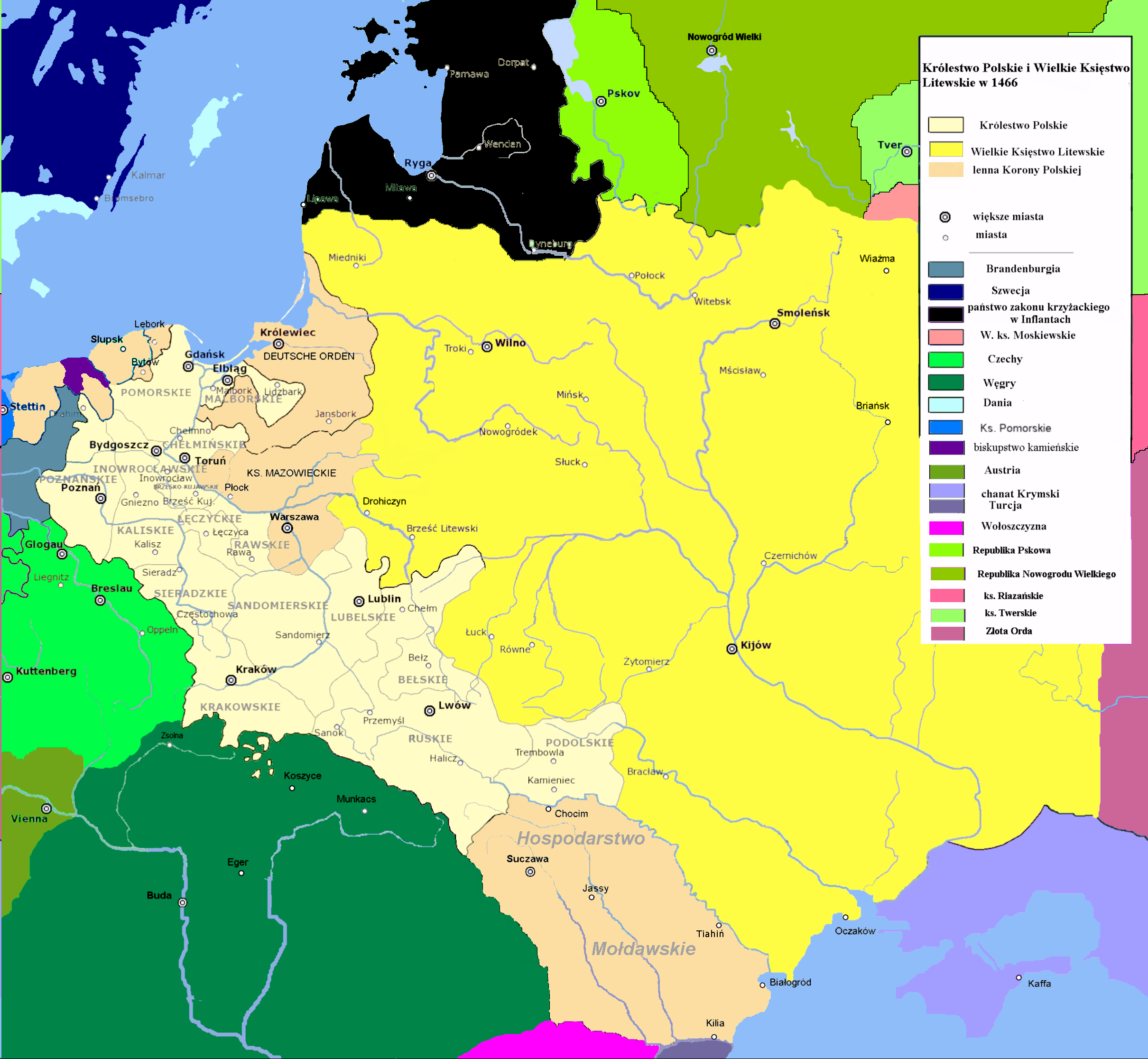
Map of Poland around 1466

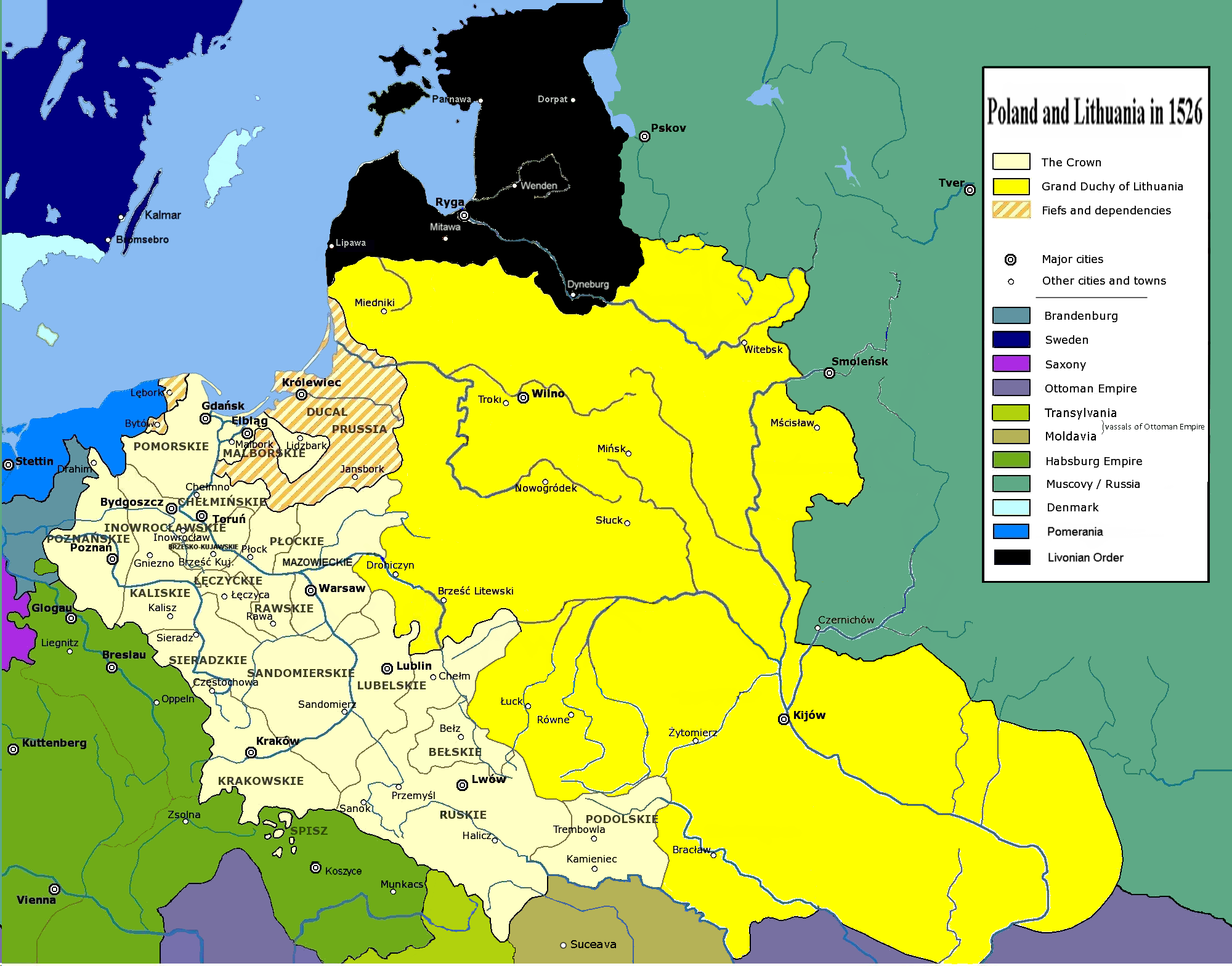
Map of Poland around 1526

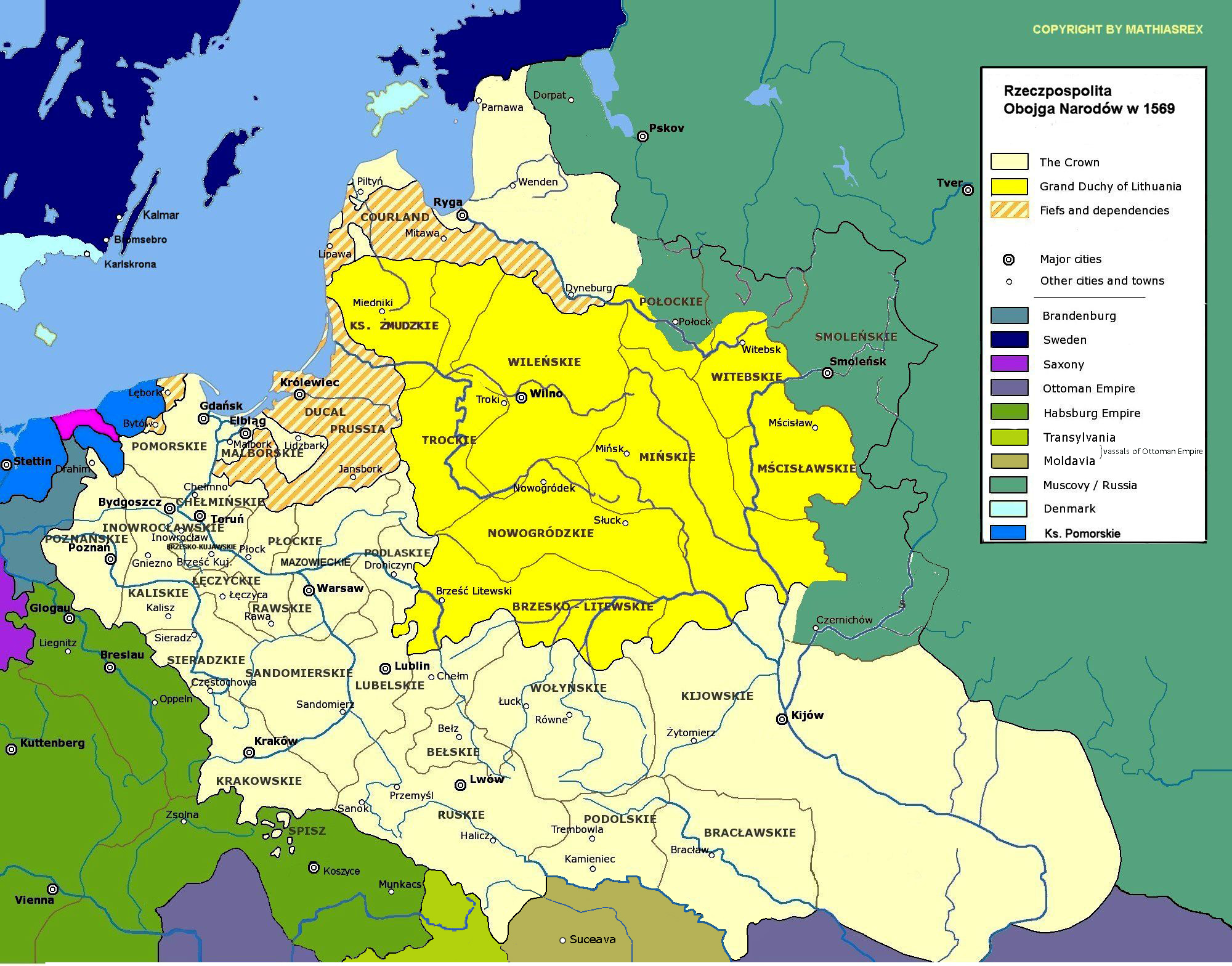
Map of the Polish-Lithuanian Commonwealth after its formation in 1569, with visible Polish-Lithuanian border. Ukrainian territories were transferred under the administrative control of the Crown of Poland.

Polish border map has changed throughout its history. Beginning with the movement of Polish tribes, the Poles established its nation, Civitas Schinesghe under the Piast dynasty, where it eventually evolved into the First Kingdom of Poland. At the early stage, the Polish nation was more concentrated in protecting its border sovereignty amidst foreign incursions and conflicts.

In 1385, the Poles started entering a union with Grand Duchy of Lithuania, which led to the rise of Second Kingdom of Poland under the Jagiellonian dynasty and also the rise of its golden era of economic, political and cultural advances. During that era, the Polish-Lithuanian union encompassed a much larger territory thanked for acquisition of Lithuanian territory under one common union, as well as its successful wars against the Teutonic Order and expansion to the south and east. The success of Polish-Lithuanian union paved way for the eventual establishment of Polish–Lithuanian Commonwealth, which became the largest country in Europe once of a time.

The establishment of Polish–Lithuanian Commonwealth helped further enriching Poland and expanded its territory, far to the east of Smolensk and west to modern Germany, making the country a European power. Poland also managed to reach out then-capital of Rurik Russia, Moscow after the Battle of Moscow, though it was short-lived.

Yet, following a successful era of expansion was the beginning of its decline and reduction of Polish territory. In 1648, Bohdan Khmelnytsky staged an uprising that led to the crippling of Polish economy and borderland. The uprising and subsequent Ukrainian alliance with Tsardom of Russia meant that the uprising also led to the beginning of invasions on Poland from Russia, as seen by the Russian Deluge on Polish land from the east. Meanwhile, the Swedish Empire, which had fought Poland several wars before, took the opportunity to launch an invasion from the north, known as the Swedish Deluge. Both Sweden and Russia had cost Poland into total destruction and devastation, with many goods being stolen by the Russians and Swedes. This war also marked the end of Poland as a European power and the future rise of Russian Empire. Though the Poles managed a famous expulsion of the Ottoman Turks out of Vienna at 1683, Poland was never able to recover from these crippling invasions by Russia and Sweden. Prussia also marked the decline of Poland for its eventual rise as a major player in Europe.

From late 17th century to 18th century, Poland attempted to reform the country, but it was marred by the frequent use of liberum veto inside the Sejm, which severely weakened by the interference of Russia and later, Austria and Prussia. During that time, the map of Poland became increasingly reduced and Poland fell to prey of imperial thirsts of the Russians, Austrians and Prussians. In order to reform the country and reclaim the lost lands, Józef Poniatowski and Tadeusz Kościuszko proposed and initiated the Constitution of Commonwealth, replacing liberum veto to limit Russian, Prussian and Austrian involvements. Eventually, following the French Revolution, the Constitution was officially passed, became the first European country to do so. However, this also led to the partitions of Poland, thus Poland disappeared from map for the next 123 years.

In 19th century witnessed significant rise of Polish nationalism. Proponents such as Adam Mickiewicz and Adam Jerzy Czartoryski sought to free Poland throughout both political and cultural movement from Russian and German oppression. As the Russians and Germans became increasingly repressive and brutal toward Poles, the nationalist sentiment also led to the increase of irredentism, which expressed by Mickiewicz's Pan Tadeusz for the desire of restoring the lost Commonwealth. Nonetheless, irredentism did not develop completely among Polish nationalists until 20th century.

== 20th century development ==
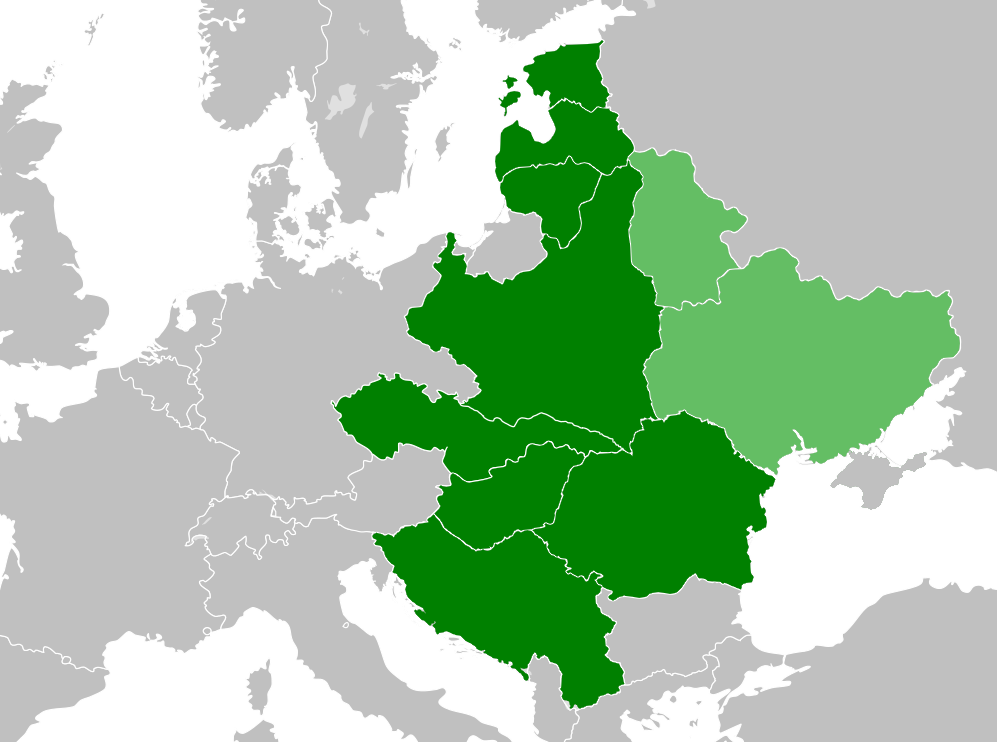
Intermarium concept proposed by Józef Piłsudski.

Some of the first Polish irredentists in this era included Józef Piłsudski, who initiated the Intermarium concept, which sought to create a united independence state in Central Europe that could deter German and Russian imperialism and to revive the fallen Commonwealth. He had worked with various Polish and even to Ukrainian, Belarusian, Lithuanian, Czechoslovak and Romanian groups in order to capitalize and to make it happen. Thus, he unofficially became one of the first modern Polish irredentists.

Unfortunately, his proposed plan faced unprecedented hostilities. The Ukrainians, Czechs and Lithuanians, in particular, did not support the project and saw it as part of Polish imperialism. The Entente was very critical and distrustful of Piłsudski, as well as underestimating Bolsheviks' threats. Meanwhile, the Soviet Russians viewed it as a threat for its agenda and vowed to thwart it. Even among major Polish irredentists like Roman Dmowski who also sought to expand Polish territory, such idea gained very little support since it required Polonization to do so. Eruptions of Polish–Ukrainian War, Polish–Czechoslovak War, Polish–Lithuanian War and Polish–Soviet War, which Poland annexed many territories, including Lithuania's capital Vilnius, dented any hope for a possible Intermarium federation, even after Piłsudski overthrew the civilian government in 1926.

Despite this, efforts to reinforce Polish irredentism continued, in accordance for the fallen Polish–Lithuanian Commonwealth. During the Interwar period, Piłsudski attempted to support Polish control among minorities of its newly-acquired territories by replacing ethnic assimilation to "state assimilation", where citizens were judged by loyalty to the state. However, tensions with minorities mounted, when Poland had to face restless resistance from the Ukrainians in Polish Galicia and increasing attacks by Organization of Ukrainian Nationalists on Polish officials and settlers further deepened tensions and hostilities. Poland also had troubles with its German minority in Silesia, as well as with the Lithuanians and Belarusians in the east.

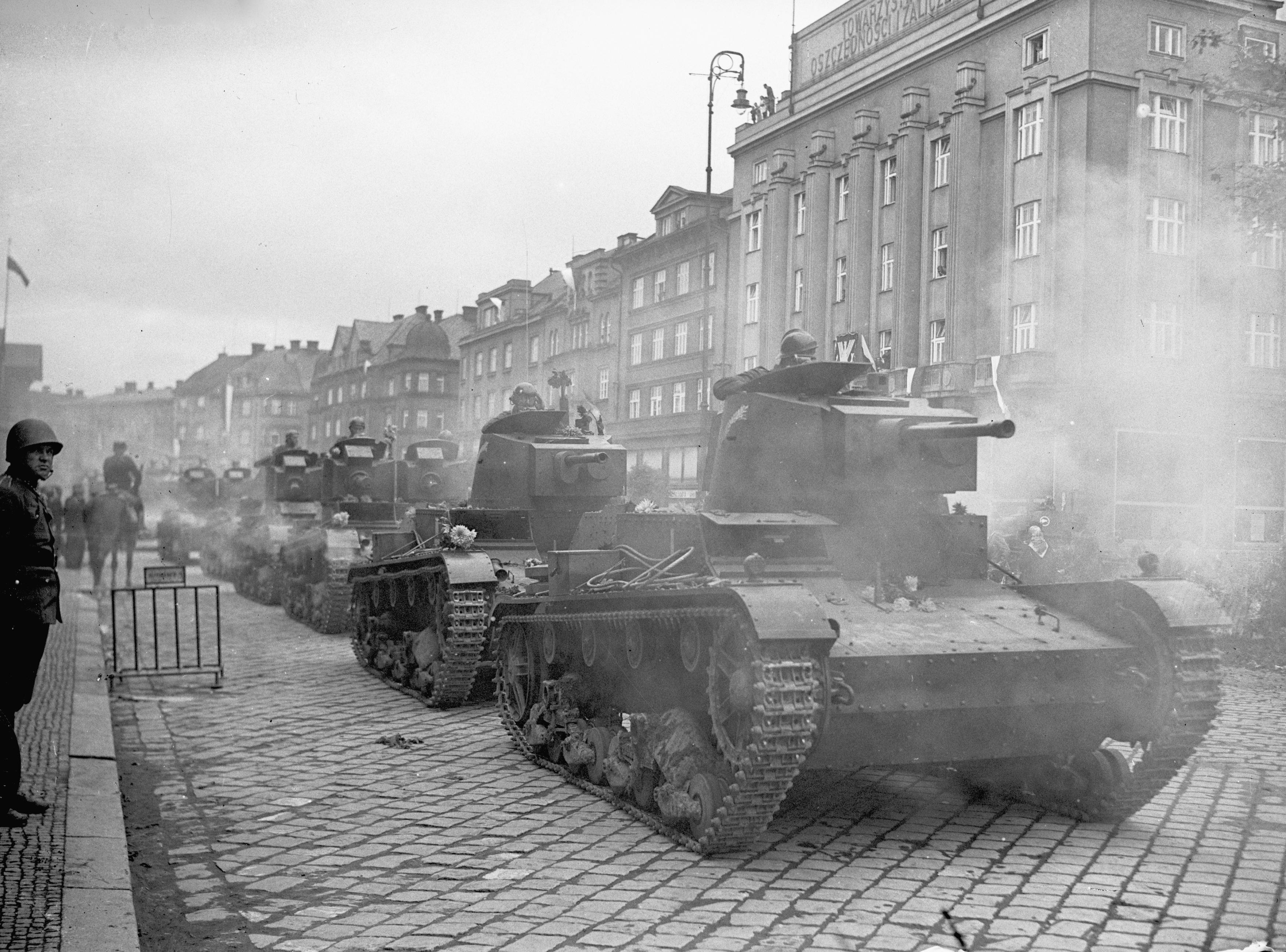
Polish Army entering Český Těšín (Czeski Cieszyn) in 1938

In 1938, Poland took advantage of increasing Nazi German irredentism on Czechoslovakia, and had annexed Trans-Olza into Polish territory. The annexation of Trans-Olza was justified by Poland to protect its Polish minority, but was strongly criticized in Czechoslovakia as a sign of ongoing Polish irredentism. With tensions on the rise, Polish irredentist movement grew stronger. Yet, it was halted in 1939 following a joint invasion of Poland by Nazi Germany and Soviet Union. Minorities like Ukrainians, Lithuanians, Germans had utilised the opportunity to demand secession from Poland, which let to frequent ethnic conflicts between Poles and minorities. These conflicts further intensified the growth of Polish irredentism and resulted in numerous massacres throughout the World War II in order to restore Polish border territory. Both the Germans and Soviets used the ethnic cards to play fool with hope of weakening irredentism among Poles and to ensure Poland could not resurge. Eventually, with Poland completely destroyed following the end of World War II, Soviet Union acquired entire of Kresy region and drew Polish border to Kresy Zachodnie as part of Recovered Territories.

During the People's Republic of Poland's era, due to communist censorship and repression, irredentism lost its official place, a legacy of Joseph Stalin's policy toward Poland. To Polish population, such repressive methods used by the Soviets made Polish irredentism back to Polish life, with many Polish livelihood in the Kresy region being stolen by the Russians and its allies (Ukrainians, Lithuanians and Belarusians). Many Poles in these recovered territories often mentioned to their dream of returning to the east, and one quote was widely mentioned that "Just one atom bomb, and we will be back in Lwów" (Jedna bomba atomowa i wrócimy znów do Lwowa). Polish irredentism was further enhanced by the painful losses Poland suffered during the World War II and how the Soviets stole it from Poland. The communist authorities did little to improve it, as the accusation of collaboration was strong among Polish public toward the communist regime, and was fearful of Polish irredentism could bring a dangerous prospect on its relations with the more powerful Soviet Union. Irredentism continued to be repressed in Communist Poland until its collapse at 1989.

== Modern Polish irredentism ==
Since the fall of communist regime, Polish irredentism did not make an immediate resurgence, as Poles were concerned of trying to rebuild the country following decades under suffering communist rule. Poland's successful economic transition from a centralized economy to a market-oriented economy granted the country accession to the European Union in 2004. However, a number of unwanted political explosion in 2010s led to the rebirth of Polish irredentism, in the wake of increasing nationalist sentiment.

=== Ukraine ===
Following Ukraine's elevation status of heroes for OUN members Stepan Bandera and Roman Shukhevych, in Poland, there have been calls about reclaiming Lviv and Galicia from Ukraine, blaming Russia of robbing Ukraine from Poland. It has drawn criticism from Ukraine.

=== Lithuania ===
Polish irredentism also sparked controversy regarding Polish historical claims of Vilnius, the current capital of Lithuania, with the thought that since the city was part of Poland dated from the Commonwealth to even the Second Polish Republic.

=== Belarus ===
Polish nationalists' irredentist sentiment also draws its desire to Belarus, given Belarus' close cultural bond with Poland from history. In Poland there are also belief that the current Cyrillic alphabet of Belarus was actually a Polish Cyrillic alphabet invented by the Russians to distance Belarusians from Poles. Polish irredentists also staged a march in Hajnowka, a Polish town with dominant Belarusian population. However, the claim receives less intention than that of Ukraine and Lithuania.

=== Russia ===
More than in the form of Polish irredentism over the Kaliningrad Oblast, a Polish annexation of the region has been more mentioned by Russian media, which has accused the Polish authorities of preparing to incorporate the region. These accusations stemmed from online comments made by readers of an article published on the Polish newspaper Gazeta Wyborcza: while the article itself did not mention any Polish alleged annexation desire, the comments suggested that the Kaliningrad Oblast should belong to Poland. Pro-Kremlin media such as Pravda.ru misleadingly reported this as an attempt by the Polish government to annex the region. Stanisław Żaryn, spokesperson for the Polish Minister Coordinator for Special Services, dismissed the allegation as "fake news".

== See also ==
- Irredentism
- Colonization attempts by Poland
