= Anna Pieńkosz =

Polish diplomat (born 1976)

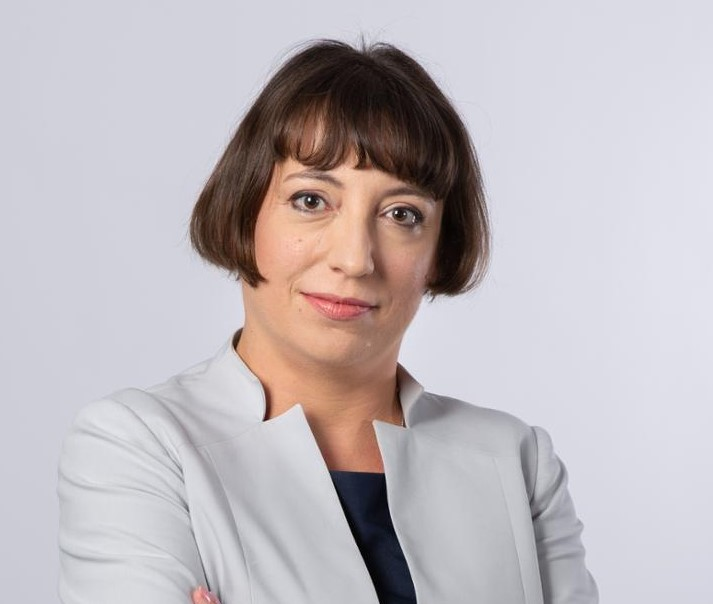

Poland Ambassador to Cuba
- In office 12 March 2015 – 15 November 2020
- Preceded by: Małgorzata Galińska-Tomaszewska
- Succeeded by: Joanna Kozińska-Frybes

Poland Ambassador to Peru
- Incumbent
- Assumed office 2025
- Preceded by: Magdalena Śniadecka-Kotarska

Personal details
- Born: 30 December 1976 (age 49) Warsaw
- Education: University of Silesia in Katowice; Maria Curie-Skłodowska University
- Profession: Diplomat

Anna Pieńkosz (born 30 December 1976 in Warsaw) is a Polish civil servant and diplomat, she served as an ambassador to Cuba (2015–2020) and Peru (since 2025).

== Life ==
Pieńkosz graduated from political science at the University of Silesia in Katowice, as well as romance studies at the Maria Curie-Skłodowska University. She was studying also at the Polish Diplomatic Academy.

In 2002, she joined the Ministry of Foreign Affairs. From 2004 at the Department of the Americas as desk officer for relations with Mercosur. Between 2006 and 2010 she was working at the embassy in Caracas, Venezuela, for a year being in charge of as chargé d’affaires. From 2010 to 2012 she was heading political-economic unit in Havana, Cuba. Since 2012 back at the Department of the Americas, responsible for relations between European Union with Latin America and the Caribbean.

In January 2015 Pieńkosz was nominated Poland ambassador to Cuba. She entered the office on 12 March 2015, and presented her credentials within two weeks. She ended her term on 15 November 2020. Between 2024 and March 2025, she was deputy director of the MFA Department of the Americas. In April 2025, she became chargé d’affaires to Peru, in July 2025 nominated Ambassador to Peru, accredited also to Bolivia.

Besides Polish, Pieńkosz speaks English and Spanish, and French languages.
