= Colonization attempts by Poland =

Poland has never had any formal colonial territories, but over its history the acquisition of such territories has at times been contemplated, though never attempted. The closest Poland came to acquiring such territories was indirectly through the actions of the Duchy of Courland and Semigallia, a fief of the Polish–Lithuanian Commonwealth which was ruled by a German elite.

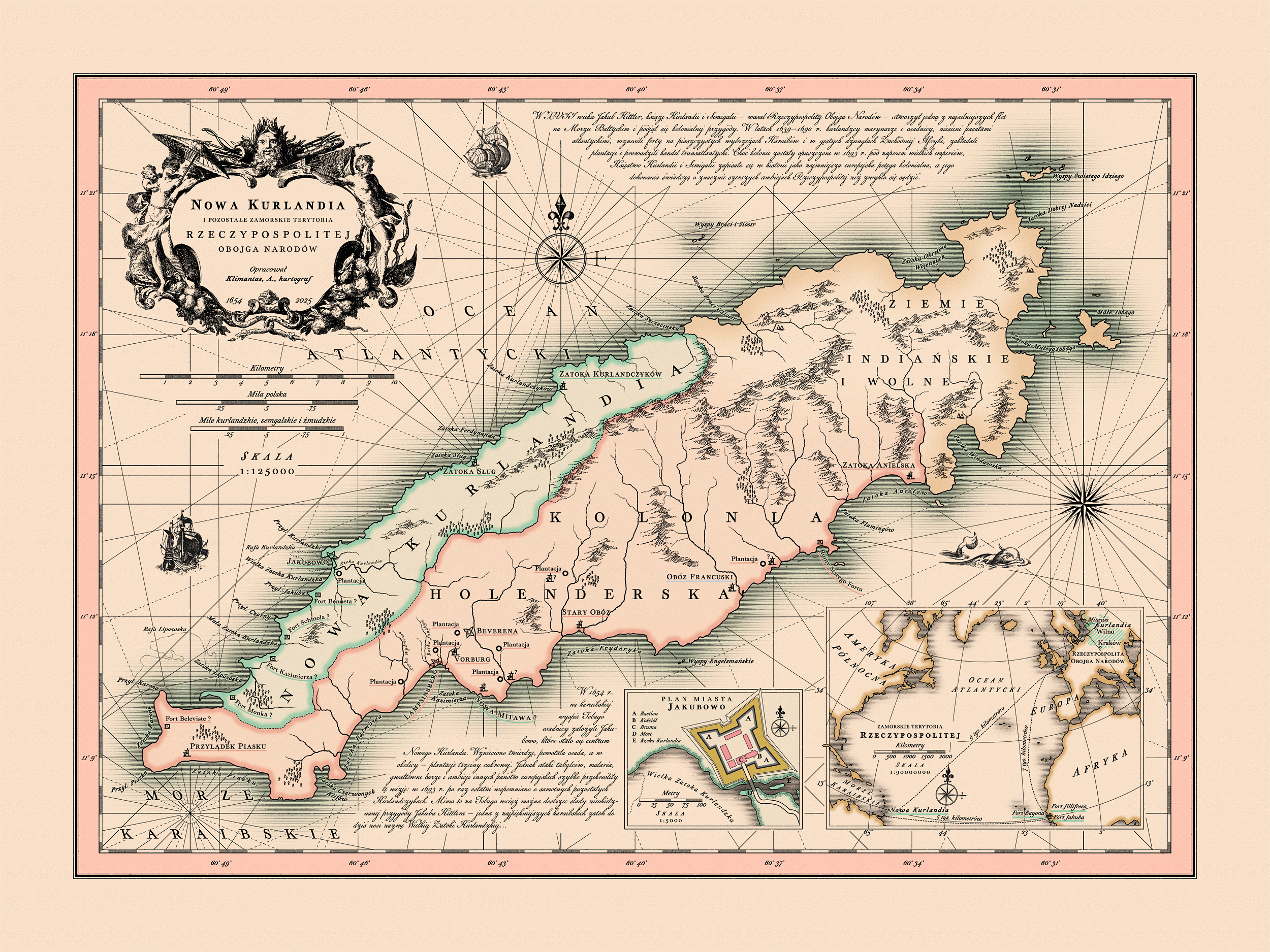
Courland settlements in Tobago

== Polish–Lithuanian Commonwealth ==
The Polish nobility was interested in colonies as early as the mid-16th century. In a contractual agreement, signed with king Henri de Valois (see also Henrician Articles), the nobles secured permission to settle in some overseas territories of the Kingdom of France, but after de Valois's decision to opt for the crown of France and return to his homeland, the idea was abandoned.

=== Duchy of Courland and Semigallia ===
On the basis of the Union of Vilnius (28 November 1561), Gotthard Kettler, the last Master of the Livonian Order, created the Duchy of Courland and Semigallia in the Baltics and became its first Duke. It was a vassal state of the Grand Duchy of Lithuania. Soon afterward, by the Union of Lublin (1 July 1569), the Grand Duchy became the part of the Polish–Lithuanian Commonwealth.

Some colonial territories for the Duchy of Courland and Semigallia were acquired by its third Duke and Gotthard's grandson Jacob Kettler. In his youth and during his studies abroad he was inspired by the wealth being brought back to various western European countries from their colonies. As a result, Kettler established one of the largest merchant fleets in Europe, with its main harbours in Windau (today Ventspils), and Libau (today Liepāja). The Commonwealth never concerned itself with the Duchy of Courland's colonial aspirations, even though in 1647 Kettler met with king Władysław IV Waza, and suggested creation of a joint trade company, which would be active in India. However, the ailing king was not interested, and Kettler decided to act on his own.

==== New Courland ====
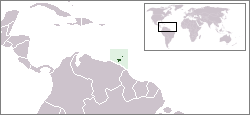
Trinidad and Tobago on a world map

The first colony founded by Jacob was the New Courland (Neu-Kurland) on the Caribbean island of Tobago. However, three initial attempts to establish a settlement (in 1637, 1639 and 1642) failed. The fourth was founded in 1654, but eventually in 1659 was taken over by a competing Dutch colony, also founded on the island in 1654. Courland regained the island after the Treaty of Oliva in 1660 but abandoned it in 1666. It briefly attempted to reestablish colonies there again in 1668 and in 1680 (that lasted to 1683). The final attempt in 1686 lasted until 1690.

==== Gambia ====
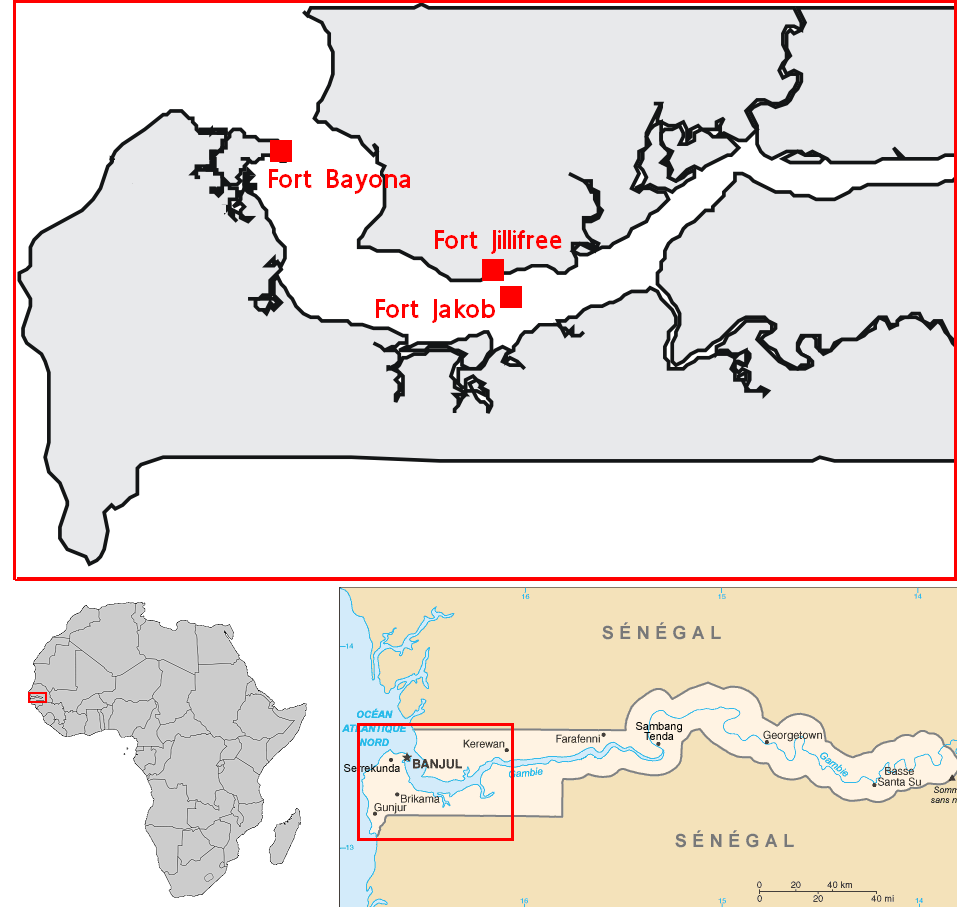
Courland settlements in Africa

In 1651 Courland bought Kunta Kinteh Island (then called St. Andrews Island by the Europeans) from a local tribe, establishing Fort James there and renaming the island. Courland also took other local land including St. Mary Island (modern day Banjul) and Fort Jillifree. The colony exported sugar, tobacco, coffee, cotton, ginger, indigo, rum, cocoa, tortoise shells, tropical birds and their feathers. The governors maintained good relations with the locals, but came into conflict with other European powers, primarily Denmark, Sweden, and the United Provinces. The Dutch annexed the Courland territories in Africa, bringing an end to their presence on the continent.

=== Toco ===
The final Courish attempt to establish a colony involved the settlement near modern Toco on Trinidad, Lesser Antilles.

== Partitioned Poland ==
=== Cameroon expedition ===
In 1882, almost a century after Poland was partitioned and lost its independence, Polish nobleman and officer of Russian Imperial Fleet, Stefan Szolc-Rogoziński organized an expedition to Cameroon. Officially that was an exploration expedition, but unofficially the expedition was looking for a place a Polish community could be founded abroad. He had no official support from the Russian Empire, nor from its puppet Congress Poland, but was backed by a number of influential Poles, including Bolesław Prus, and Henryk Sienkiewicz. On 13 December 1882, accompanied by Leopold Janikowski and Klemens Tomczek, Rogoziński left French port of Le Havre, aboard a ship Lucja Małgorzata, with French and Polish flags. The expedition was a failure, and he returned to Europe, trying to collect more money for his project. Finally, after second expedition, Rogoziński found himself in Paris, where he died 1 December 1896.

Meanwhile, Cameroon was being slowly annexed by the German Empire. In 1884 Rogoziński signed an agreement with a British representative, who was to provide support for treaties he signed with Cameroonian chieftains, but next year, at the Berlin Conference, the British government decided against pursuing any claims in the region and acceded to German claims (see Kamerun).

== Second Polish Republic ==
Poland regained independence in the aftermath of World War I. While colonization was never a major focus of the Second Polish Republic, organizations like the Maritime and Colonial League and Colonial Society supported the idea of creating Polish colonies. The Maritime and Colonial League traces its origins to the Polska Bandera (Polish Banner) organization founded on 1 October 1918. The League supported purchases of lands by Polish emigrants in places like Brazil and Liberia. It became highly influential in shaping the government's policies with regards to Polish Merchant Marine, despite its long and ongoing campaign (publications, exhibitions, speeches, lobbying, etc.) and public support, but never succeeded in following up with its plans to obtain a colonial territory for Poland. The Colonial Society (Towarzystwo Kolonizacyjne) was founded in Warsaw in 1926. Its task was to direct Polish emigrants to South America, and the Society soon became active there, mostly in the Brazilian state of Espírito Santo.

Some historians, such as Tadeusz Piotrowski, have characterized government policies supporting interwar Polish settlement in modern-day Ukraine and Belarus as colonization (see Osadnik). Using a highly theoretical framework, one scholar argues that Poland's settlement projects, in particular the Liberian affair, should be seen as a rework of the New South ideology that considered Africans as people who could only implement hard labour such as land cultivation and assume inferior economic and political positions, as attributed to African-Americans in the New South. Such projects, the argument goes, would lead to the prioritization of European lives over Africans' with economic and racial implications. In contrast, several Polish and Polish-American historians attribute fewer racist motivations to Poland's attempts in Africa and Latin America. They point out that Poland's largely economic attempts to acquire tropical materials unavailable in continental Europe became infused with counterproductive colonial discourse still popular across Europe at the time. The Polish projects, less politically expansionist than they might seem, fulfilled specific functions in Polish foreign policy not only in relation to the question of Jewish emigration but also in Polish-German relations.

The following regions were considered for Polish colonization during the interwar period:

- Brazil (Paraná region): Polish emigration to that region began even before World War I, in the 1930s approximately 150,000 Poles lived there (18.3% of local inhabitants). Government-sponsored settlement action began there in 1933, after the Maritime and Colonial League, together with other organizations, had bought a total of 250,000 hectares of land. The Brazilian government, fearing that the Poles might plan to annex part of Brazil, reacted very quickly, limiting activities of Polish organizations. Since the government in Warsaw did not want to intervene, the project ended by late 1930s See also: Polish minority in Brazil
- Peru (near Ucayali River): positively assessed in 1927. In January 1928, a Polish expedition headed for the area of the Ucayali, to check possibilities of creation of settlements for farmers on several thousand hectares of rainforest. Soon afterward, the first settlers arrived in Peru, but because of the Great Depression, the government in Warsaw ceased to fund the expedition. Private donations were insufficient. Furthermore, the first settlers discovered local conditions to be much worse than advertised. In 1933, the contract with the Peruvians was terminated, and to avoid international scandal, all settlers returned to Poland.
- Angola: On 14 December 1928, the Maritime and Colonial League sent an expedition to Angola, which was then a Portuguese colony. The plan was to try to bring as many Polish immigrants as possible, and then try to purchase some land from the Portuguese. However, after five years, one of the first pioneers in Angola, Michał Zamoyski, wrote: "Personally, I would not persuade anybody to live in Angola". Living conditions were difficult, profits were marginal, and the idea was abandoned.
- Liberia: Liberian and Polish governments had good relations because of Polish support for Liberia in the League of Nations. In the fall of 1932, the League of Nations drafted a plan which projected turning Liberia into a protectorate, governed by one of members of the League. The plan was the result of internal policies of Liberia, where slavery was widespread. Since Poland was not regarded by the Liberians as a country which had colonial aspirations, in late 1932 unofficial envoy of Liberian government, dr Leo Sajous, came to Warsaw to ask for help. In April 1933, an agreement was signed between Liberia and the Maritime and Colonial League. The Africans agreed to lease minimum of 60 hectares of land to Polish farmers, for a period of 50 years. Polish businesses were awarded the status of the most favoured nation, and Warsaw was permitted to found a society to exploit natural resources of Liberia. Liberian government invited settlers from Poland in 1934. Altogether, the Liberians granted to Polish settlers 50 plantations, with total area of 7,500 acres (3,035 ha). In the second half of 1934, six Polish farmers left for Liberia: Giżycki, Szablowski, Brudziński, Chmielewski, Januszewicz and Armin. The project was not fully supported by the Polish government but rather by the Maritime League; only few dozens of Poles took on that offer (because of Liberian requests that the settlers should bring significant capital) and their ventures proved to be, on the most part, unprofitable. The original of the agreement has been lost, but, according to some sources, there was a secret protocol that allowed Poland to draft 100,000 African soldiers. The Polish involvement in Liberia was harshly opposed by the United States of America, creator of the nation of Liberia. As a result of American pressure, in 1938 the Polish Ministry of Foreign Affairs closed the office of the Maritime and Colonial League in Monrovia.
- Mozambique: plans for colonization of Mozambique were tied to business investments by some Polish enterprise near the late 1930s and never progressed beyond normal foreign investment (acquisition of agricultural lands and mines).
- Madagascar: In 1774, Maurice Benyovszky, a Slovak who saw himself as Polish, had attempted to establish a colony ordained by the French government in Madagascar, but later having abandoned in 1776 due to difficulties posed by the natives of the island, the terrain and climate. Another plan for acquiring the French colony of Madagascar by the Polish government was discussed in 1926, but the idea was deemed to be unfeasible. The idea was revisited in the 1930s, when it was proposed that Polish Jews, who were perceived to dominate the Polish professions, be encouraged to emigrate. At one point, Polish foreign minister Józef Beck bluntly proposed that Madagascar be used as a "dumping ground" for Poland's "surplus" Jewish population. The Polish government proposed the concept of Jewish emigration to Madagascar to the League of Nations in 1936 and sent a delegation to evaluate the island in 1937. France, seeking to strengthen its ties with Poland and discourage Polish-German cooperation, participated in the venture, which included the French official Marcel Moutet. Warsaw sent a special delegation to Madagascar, under major of the Polish Army Mieczysław Lepecki. The plan is variously described as having come to nought shortly after the 1937 expedition or as being terminated by the German Invasion of Poland in September 1939.
- Tanganyika and Cameroon: Various Polish authors, unsupported by the government, expressed interests in this region on the grounds that they were in part discovered by Stefan Szolc-Rogoziński and that Europe owed a general debt to Poland for the Polish-Soviet War.

== See also ==
- Czechoslovak Togo
- Territorial evolution of Poland
- Polonization
- Morska Wola
- Haren, Germany
- Impact of Western European colonialism and colonisation
- Racism in Poland
