= Amazon Go =

American convenience store chain

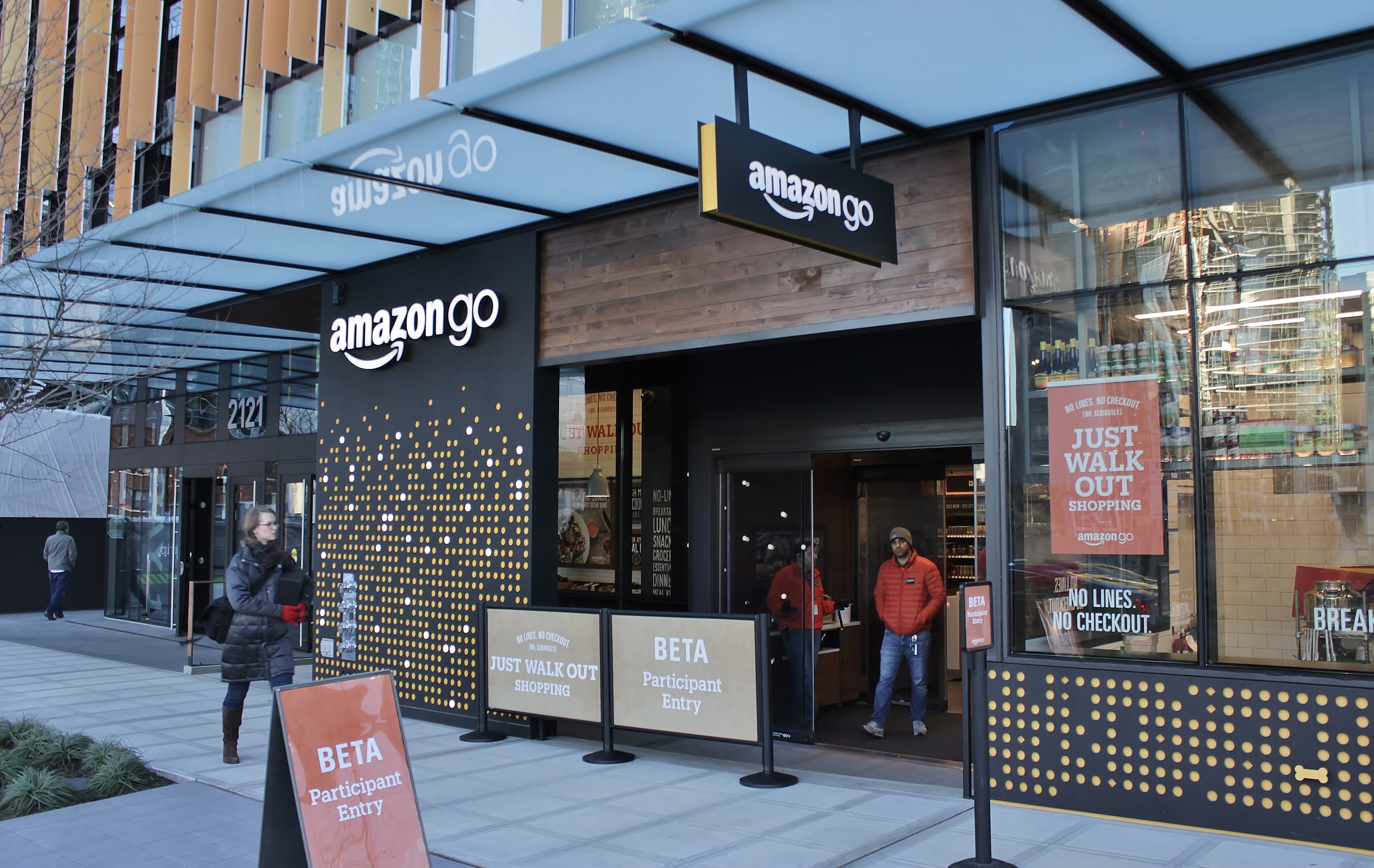
- The first Amazon Go location, at Day 1 in Seattle
- Type: Subsidiary
- Industry: Retail; Convenience stores
- Founded: December 2016; 9 years ago Seattle, Washington, U.S.
- Defunct: February 1, 2026; 9 months ago
- Fate: Closed by parent company
- Successor: Whole Foods Market
- Number of locations: 43 (2024)
- Area served: Seattle; New York City; Chicago; Los Angeles; London
- Parent: Amazon
- Website: amazon.com/go

Amazon Go was a chain of convenience stores in the United States and the United Kingdom, operated by the online retailer Amazon. The stores were cashierless, thus partially automated (having an added option in some locations to manually checkout if desired), with customers having the ability to purchase products without being checked out by a cashier or using a self-checkout station. In 2023, there were 43 open and announced store locations in Seattle, Chicago, Los Angeles, London and New York City.

Amazon Go stores were conceptualized and tested by a team of Amazon executives, who constructed a 15,000 square feet (1,400 m^{2}) mock supermarket in a rented warehouse in Seattle, before revealing the work to Amazon founder Jeff Bezos in 2015. The first store, located in the company's Day 1 building, opened to employees on December 5, 2016, and to the public on January 22, 2018. The flagship store sold products such as prepared foods, meal kits, limited groceries and liquor. A larger variant, Amazon Go Grocery, opened in Seattle's Capitol Hill neighborhood on February 25, 2020. The following month Amazon began to offer its technology to other retailers so that their customers could make purchases without the involvement of cashiers or Amazon accounts.

On January 27, 2026, Amazon announced it would close all Amazon Go and Amazon Fresh locations, shifting to expanding Whole Foods operations. All remaining locations had closed by February 1, 2026.

== Technology and implementation ==
Amazon described Go stores to have used several technologies, including computer vision, deep learning algorithms, and sensor fusion for the purchase, checkout, and payment steps associated with a retail transaction, which was later revealed to be supported remotely by a team of people in India. The store concept is seen as a model that relies on the prevalence of smartphones and geofencing technology to streamline the customer experience, as well as supply chain and inventory management. However, public rollout of the Seattle Amazon Go prototype location was delayed due to issues with the sensors' ability to track multiple users or objects within the store, such as when children move items to other shelves or when multiple customers have a similar body habitus.

The Amazon Go app for iOS and Android links to their Amazon account and is the primary method of paying for items at the store, alongside cash at certain locations. The app is required to enter the store, which has turnstiles that scan a QR code generated on the app. The app allows users to add others to their Amazon account, so a family's purchases can be charged to the same bill. The ceiling of the store has multiple cameras and store shelves have weight sensors, to detect which item(s) a customer took. If a customer takes an item off the shelf, it will be added to the customer's virtual cart. Similarly, if a customer places an item back on the shelf, it is removed from the customer's virtual cart.

== Locations ==
As of March 2024, there were 22 store locations in the United States and 20 in the United Kingdom.

#	City and state	Date of first store	Number of stores	Ref(s)
1	Seattle, Washington	January 22, 2018	7	
2	Chicago, Illinois	September 17, 2018	5	
4	New York City, New York	May 7, 2019	7	
5	London, United Kingdom (branded as Amazon Fresh)	March 4, 2021	20	
6	Los Angeles County, California	November 1, 2022	3	
Total			43	

Amazon Go's cashierless layout and technology, branded as "Just Walk Out", is also used in cashierless stores with other brands and inside facilities such as airports and sports venues.

== Stores ==
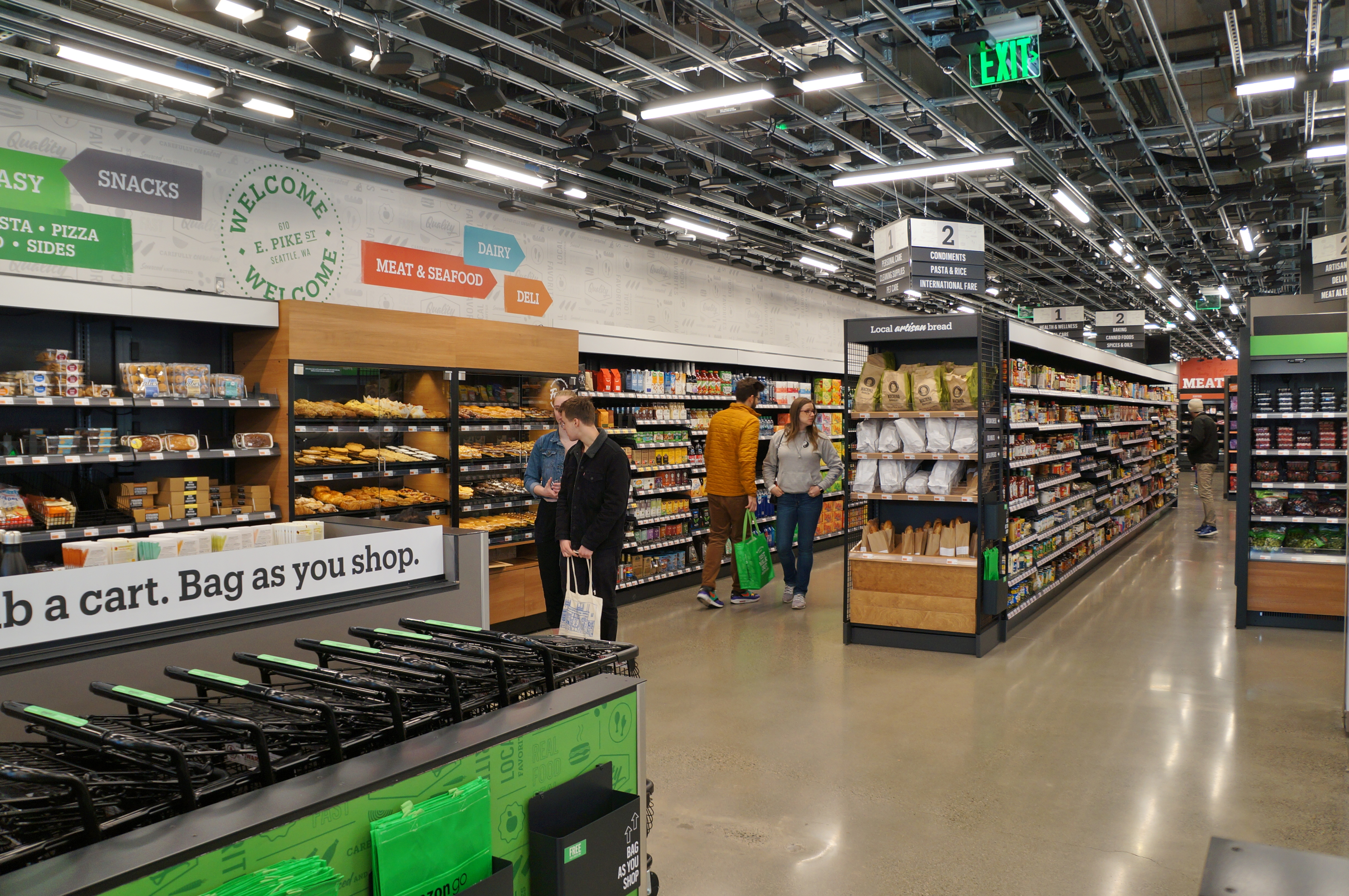
Interior of the first Amazon Go Grocery store in Seattle

In its report on the opening of the first location, The Wall Street Journal said that Amazon planned to open at least three stores, each with a different format. In October 2016, Business Insider reported that they had seen internal Amazon documents detailing plans to open as many as 2,000 stores over the next ten years. This was refuted by an Amazon spokesman, who insisted the company was still learning.

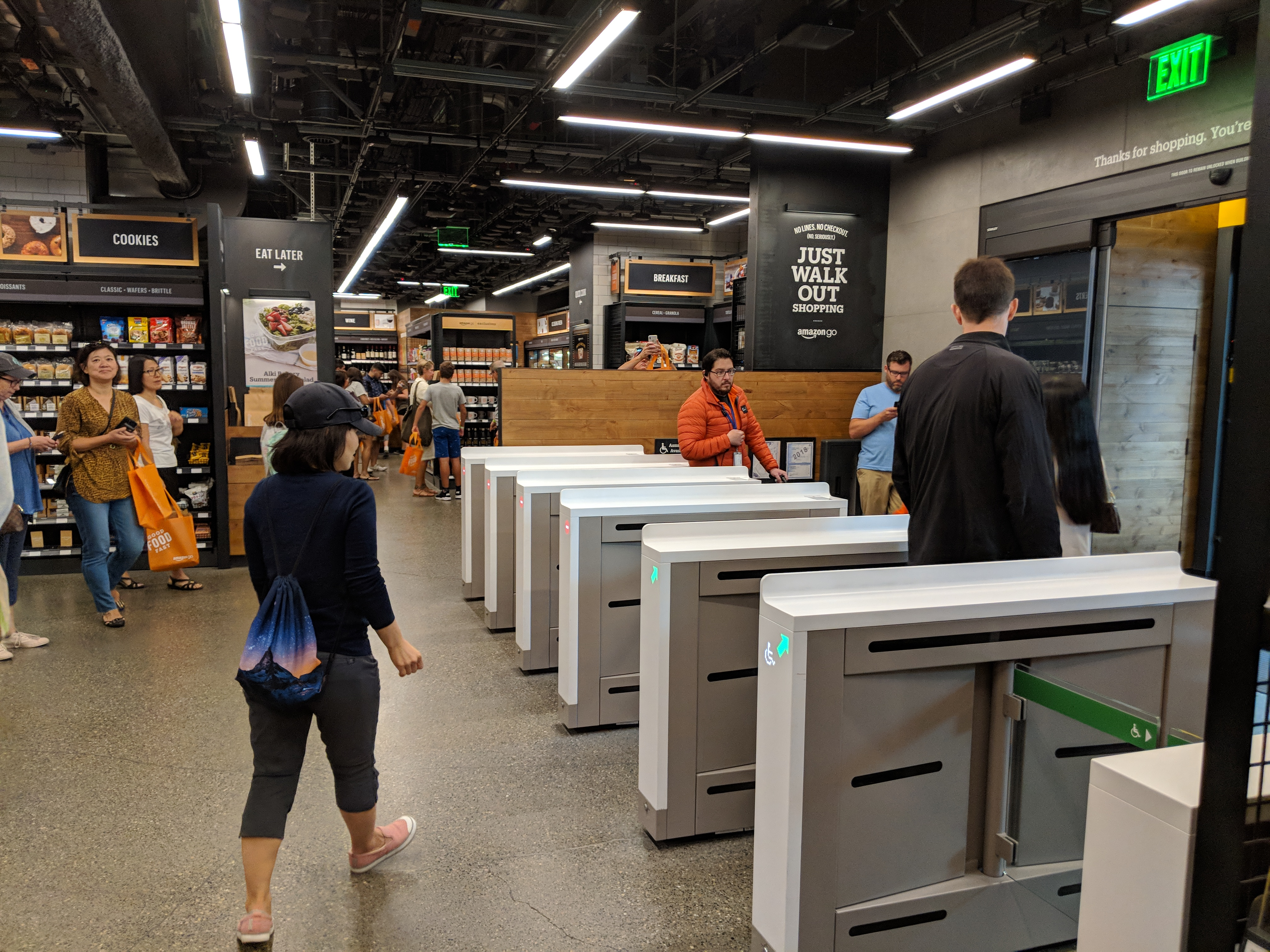
Entrance and exit turnstiles at the first Amazon Go store

The Verge reported that the first store was scheduled to open to the public in early January 2017, preceded by a December 2016 beta version for Amazon employees only. At 1,800 square feet (170 m^{2}) it was only the size of a corner convenience store. By October 2017, the store had yet to open to the public due to issues with the technology tracking over 20 people at one time. The public opening finally took place on January 22, 2018.

In addition to stocking name brands and local brands, the store sells many of Amazon's house brands, such as Wickedly Prime and 365. A second Downtown Seattle location at the Madison Centre opened on August 27, 2018. The third Amazon Go store, at the Troy Block complex in South Lake Union, is the second largest at 2,100 square feet (200 m^{2}) and opened in September 2018.

In May 2018, The Seattle Times reported that Amazon was planning to open Amazon Go stores in Chicago and San Francisco; and in September, it was confirmed that the company planned to open a store in New York City. In September 2018, Amazon Go opened its first location outside of Seattle at the company's offices in the Chicago Loop. That same month, Bloomberg News reported Amazon was considering plans to open as many as 3,000 Amazon Go locations across the United States by 2021. An Amazon Go location was opened in San Francisco on October 23, 2018, at 98 Post Street.

In response to potential discrimination against low-income people, San Francisco, Philadelphia, and New Jersey have passed legislation banning cashless stores and retailers. A new Amazon Go store in New York City opened on May 7, 2019, with cash acceptance in response to previous criticism over the use of app-only purchases and its effects on the poor. In response to the legislation, stores in San Francisco also accept cash, with an attendant at the front letting in and checking out customers if they do not have the app.

On February 25, 2020, Amazon opened the first Amazon Go Grocery store in Seattle's Capitol Hill neighborhood. The Go Grocery store is significantly larger than other Go stores, at 10,400 square feet (970 m^{2}), and offers 5,000 items, including fresh produce and baked goods. A second Go Grocery location opened in September 2020 in the Overlake neighborhood of Redmond, Washington.

In 2023, Amazon announced it would close eight Amazon Go stores in Seattle, New York City and San Francisco.

On April 4, 2024, it was revealed that Amazon's "Just Walk Out" technology was supported by approximately 1,000 Indian workers who manually reviewed transactions. Despite claims of being fully automated through computer vision, a significant portion of transactions required this manual verification. Additionally, Amazon announced plans to replace the "Just Walk Out" technology with Dash Carts in Amazon Fresh stores, aiming to enhance customer experience with features like locating products and viewing receipts in real-time.

== See also ==
- Automated convenience store
- Automated retail
- Cashierless store
- Cashless society
- Technological unemployment
