= Automated convenience store =

Store that operates without staff

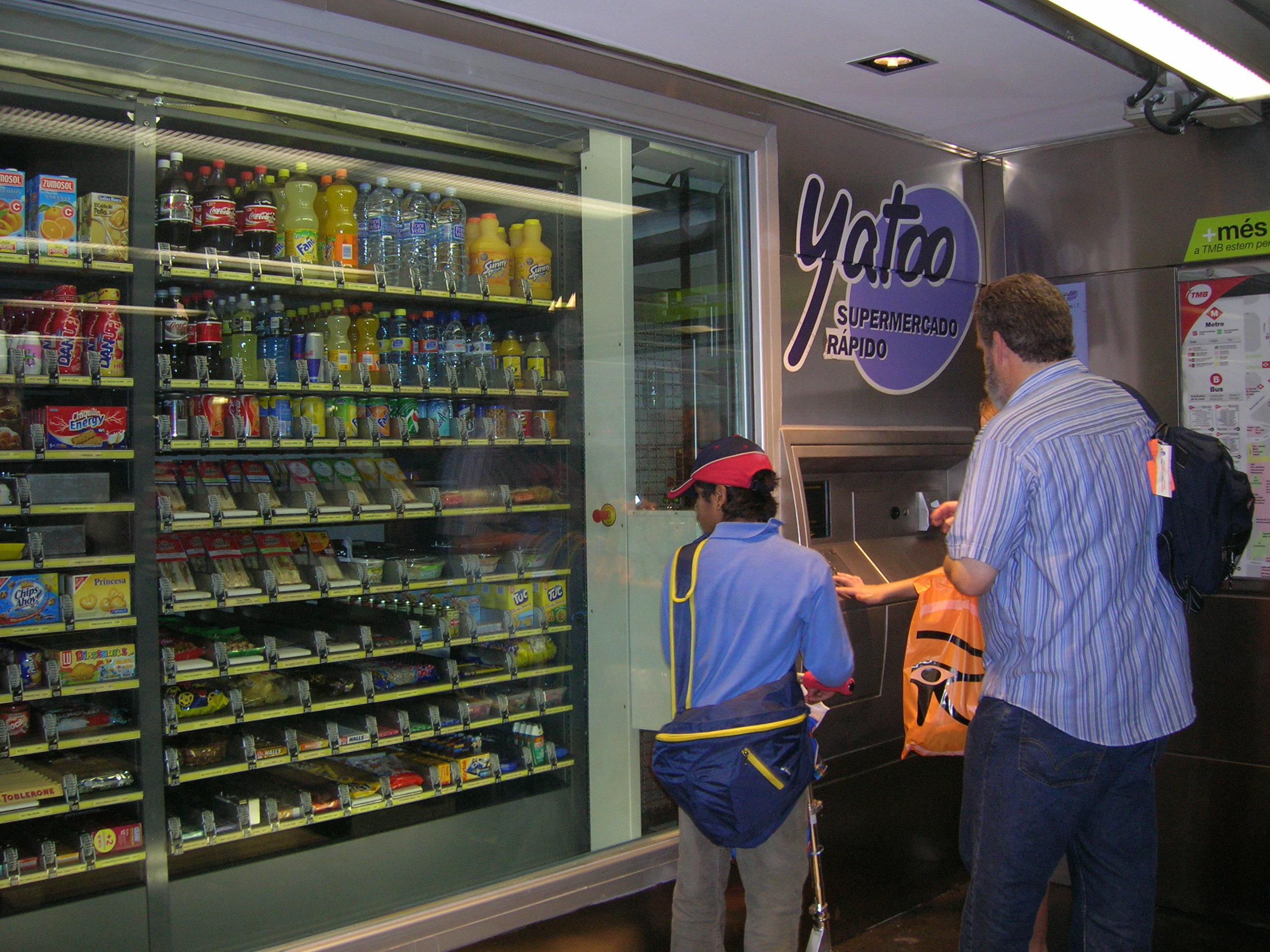
Automated grocery store in Barcelona, Spain (2006)

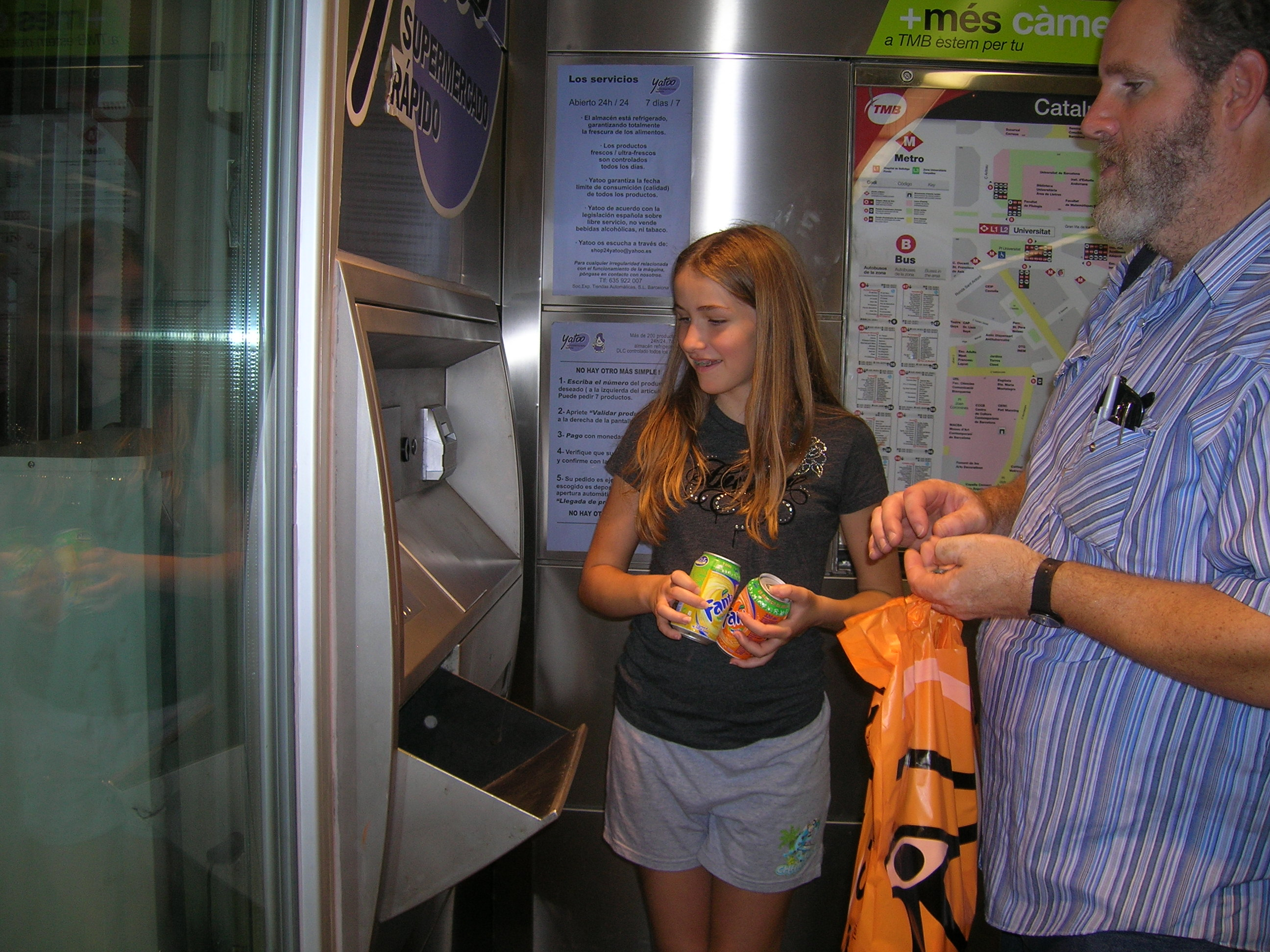
Automated grocery store in Barcelona metro (2006)

An automated convenience store is a convenience store that operates without a cashier, and instead relies on computers and robotics.

== Examples ==
Examples include Keedoozle, Amazon Go, Żabka Nano, Robomart, Shop24, and SmartMart.

=== Robomart ===
Robomart has created an autonomous grocery store on wheels that offers consumers the ability to pick their own groceries at home checkout-free.

=== Shop24 ===
Shop24 operates 170 automated convenience stores in nine European countries and 7 in the United States. An average store costs $90,000.

=== SmartMart ===
In 1986, after entrepreneur Mike Rivalto's wife came home irritated and frustrated due to the long checkout line in the convenience store, Rivalto conceived the SmartMart, an automated convenience store. After seven years of research and development, the concept was ready to become a reality when technology caught up to the idea in the mid-1990s. In 2003, the first proof of concept store was opened at a location in East Memphis. In 2011, after the store did more than 1.4 million transactions in eight years, it was replaced by SmartMart's latest technology. At SmartMart, a consumer can drive in or walk up to a computer touch screen and select from up to 1,800 products available. The machine accepts payments by cash, credit or debit card and delivers purchased items through a drawer. Development of the SmartMart including gas pumps costs approximately $100,000 more than a 3,000 square foot convenience store, but the labor savings are substantial as a single control center worker can operate the entire business. In 2009, deputies accused SmartMart of selling a 24-ounce can of beer to an underage buyer.

== See also ==
- Automat
- Automated retail
- Automated retailing
- Cashierless store
- Kiva Systems
- Self-checkout
- Vending machine
