= Self-checkout =

Machine for customers to complete a retail transaction

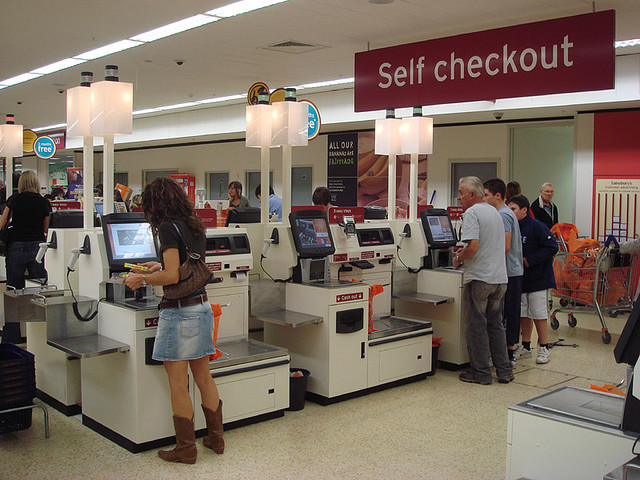
NCR Corporation model of self-service checkouts and fast-lane at a Sainsbury's store

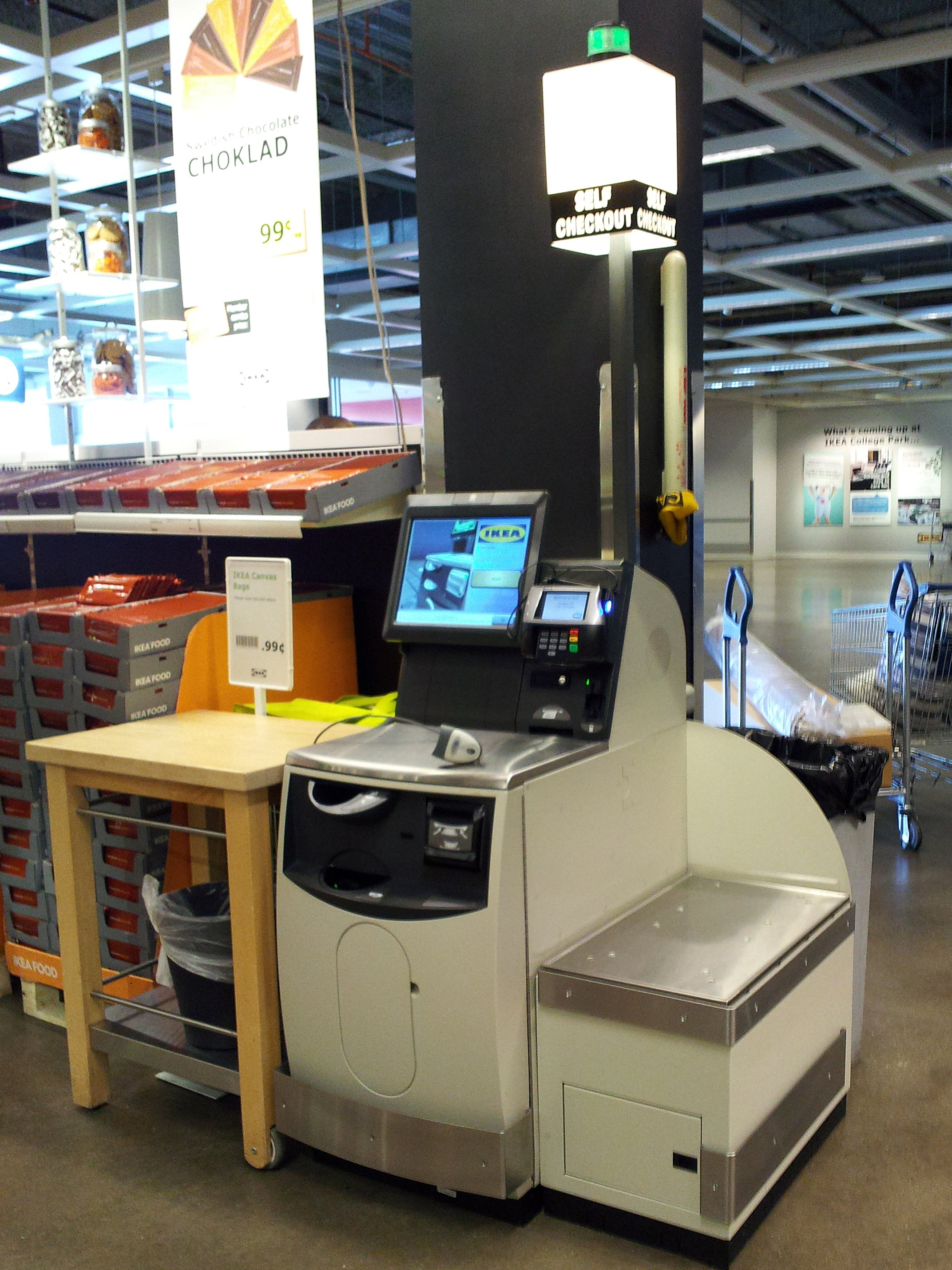
NCR Corporation model of self-service checkout at an IKEA store

Self-checkouts (SCOs), also known as assisted checkouts (ACOs) or self-service checkouts, are machines that allow customers to complete their own transaction with a retailer without using a staffed checkout. When using SCOs, customers scan item barcodes before paying for their purchases without needing one-to-one staff assistance. Self-checkouts are used mainly in supermarkets, although they are sometimes also found in department or convenience stores. Most self-checkout areas are supervised by at least one staff member, often assisting customers to process transactions, correcting prices, or otherwise providing service.

As of 2013, there were 191,000 self-checkout units deployed around the globe, and by 2025, it is predicted that 1.2 million units will be installed worldwide. It has been estimated that "the self-checkout system market in the U.S., which accounts for 41% of the global market, reached $1.4 billion in 2021."

The machines were originally invented by David R. Humble at Deerfield Beach, Florida-based company CheckRobot Inc., with NCR Corporation having the largest market share. They were introduced to the public in July 1986; the first machine, produced by CheckRobot, was installed in a Kroger store near Atlanta, Georgia.

== Typical systems ==
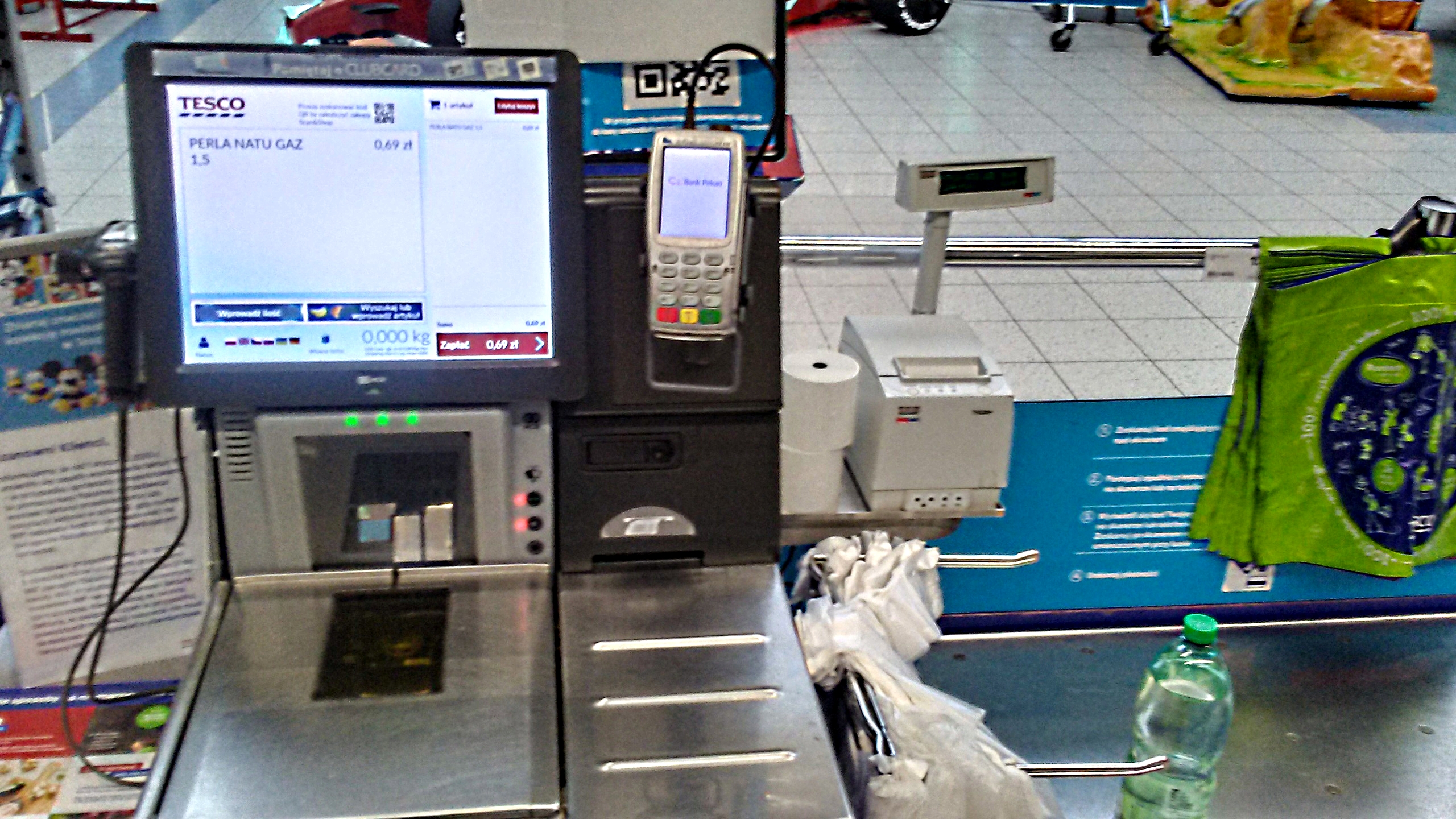
A self-service checkout at a Tesco store in Poland.

In self-checkout systems, the customer is typically required to:

- Scan product barcodes where these exist.
- Weigh products (such as fresh produce) without barcodes and select the variety on a touchscreen display.
- Place all scanned items into a "bagging area". The weight observed in the bagging area is verified against previously stored information to ensure that the correct item is bagged, allowing the customer to proceed only if the observed and expected weights match.
- Make payment using a PIN pad or a cash slot.

There is normally at least one supervising staff member who will assist customers when required, authorise the sale of age-restricted products such as medicines, alcohol, knives and tobacco, remove or de-sensitize electronic article surveillance devices, and provide additional loss prevention and customer service. In 2024, German supermarket chain Lidl started trials using a check weigher at some self-checkout terminals.

=== Scanning while shopping ===
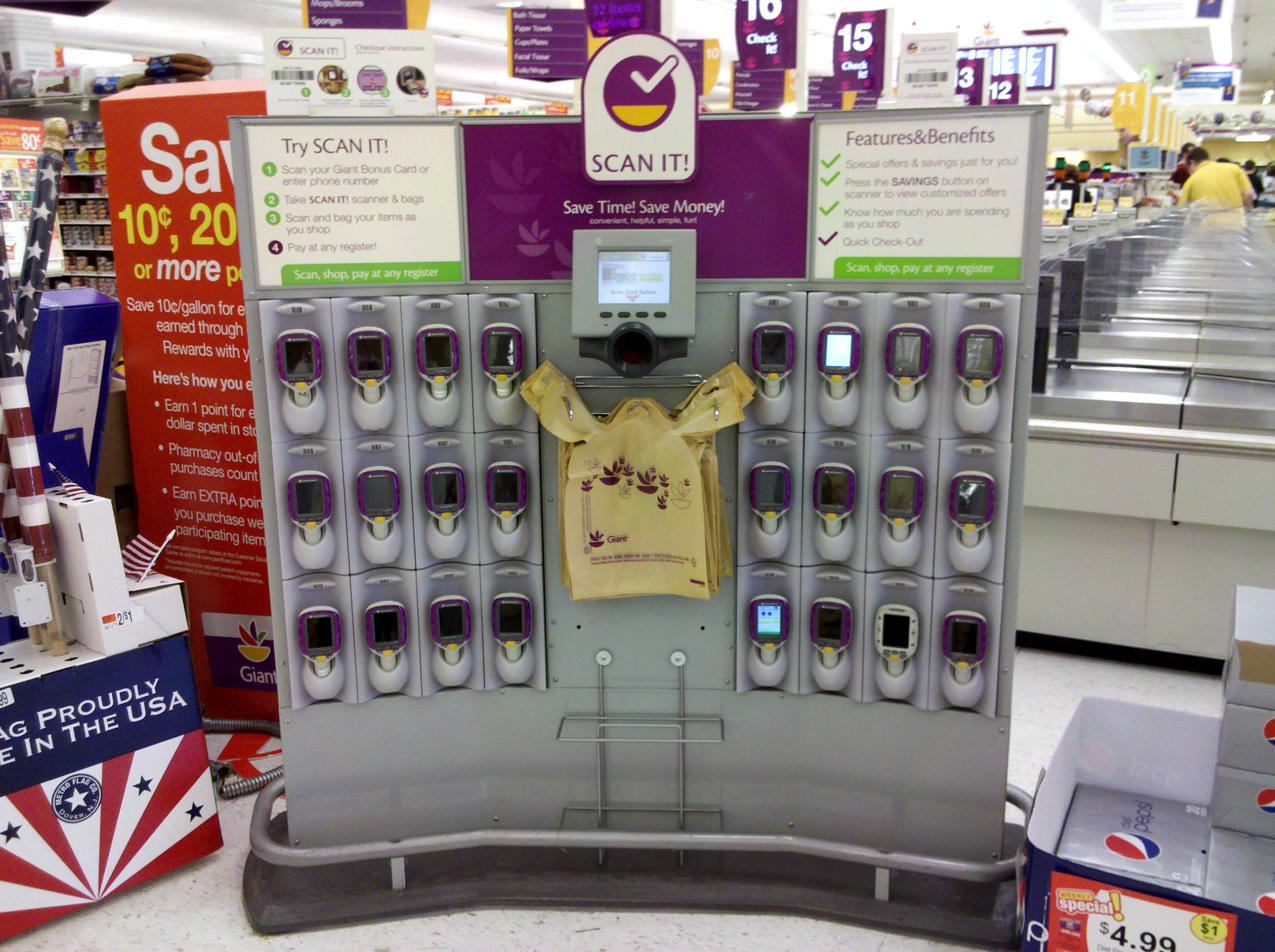
"Scan It" kiosk at Giant Food store

An alternative system (self-scanning) consists of a portable barcode scanner that is used by the customer to scan and bag items while shopping. When the customer has finished shopping, the scanner is brought to a checkout kiosk, where the information from the barcode scanner is downloaded to the kiosk, usually in conjunction with a customer loyalty card. The customer pays and receives a receipt at the checkout kiosk. The integrity of the system is maintained through the use of random audits or RFID. Stop & Shop uses handheld scanners or mobile phone apps for its "ScanIt!" as-you-go system for customers who want to use it.

The Walmart-owned warehouse club, Sam's Club, allows customers to download an app and scan items into their cart using a mobile application. In summer 2018, Walmart China launched its Wechat-based "Scan and Go" program, allowing customers to scan items into their carts without downloading another mobile app, while paying through Wechat Payment or Alipay. The "Scan and Go" program carried 30% of all payments made in Chinese stores, and even improved sales in certain markets by 10%.

In December 2016, Amazon announced a brick-and-mortar store in Seattle under the name Amazon Go, which uses a variety of cameras and sensors in order to see what customers are putting into their shopping bags. The customers scan a QR code when they enter the store through a companion app, which is linked to their Amazon.com account. When the customer exits the store, the items in their bag are automatically charged to the account.

=== Hybrid systems ===
Suppliers like ITAB, NCR, Wincor-Nixdorf, and others have manufactured hybrid checkout systems that allows the checkout counter to be switched between either a cashier operated mode or a customer self-service mode.

=== Open-source systems ===
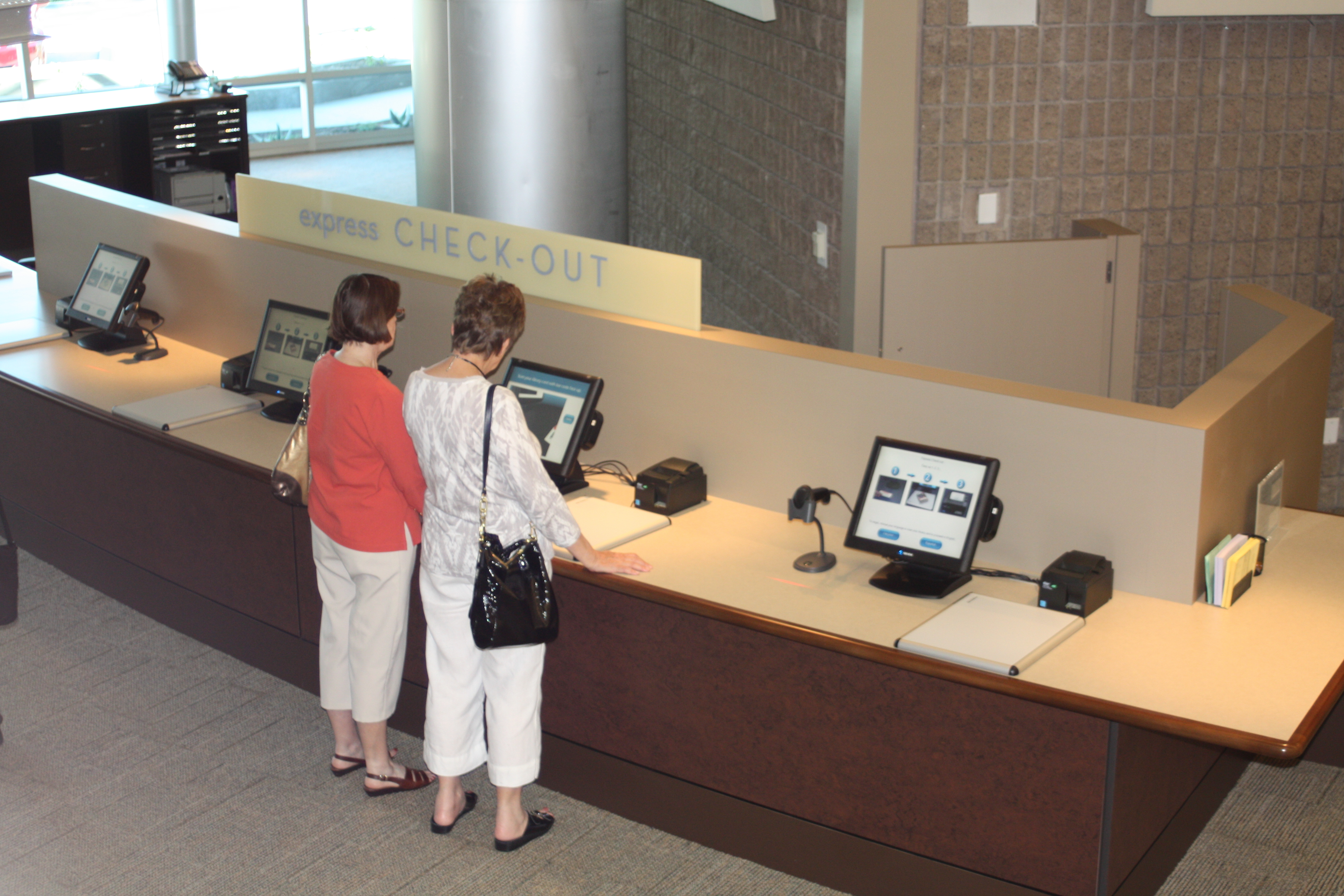
Depending on the overall set-up, self-checkout stations in libraries might run on open-source or proprietary software.

In 2010, the open-source-self-check project was announced. By using hardware and open source software, this library self-checkout system costs less than one-tenth of the commercial version.

A Java-based open source self-check client for libraries, which has been used at the University of Oxford, is also available under a GPL v3 license.

=== RFID-based system ===
Several experimental stores in China use a combination of RFID and cameras to determine which products a customer has picked. Upon leaving, the customer passes through an RFID-reading gate and only has to pay the bill to check out.

=== Camera-based systems ===
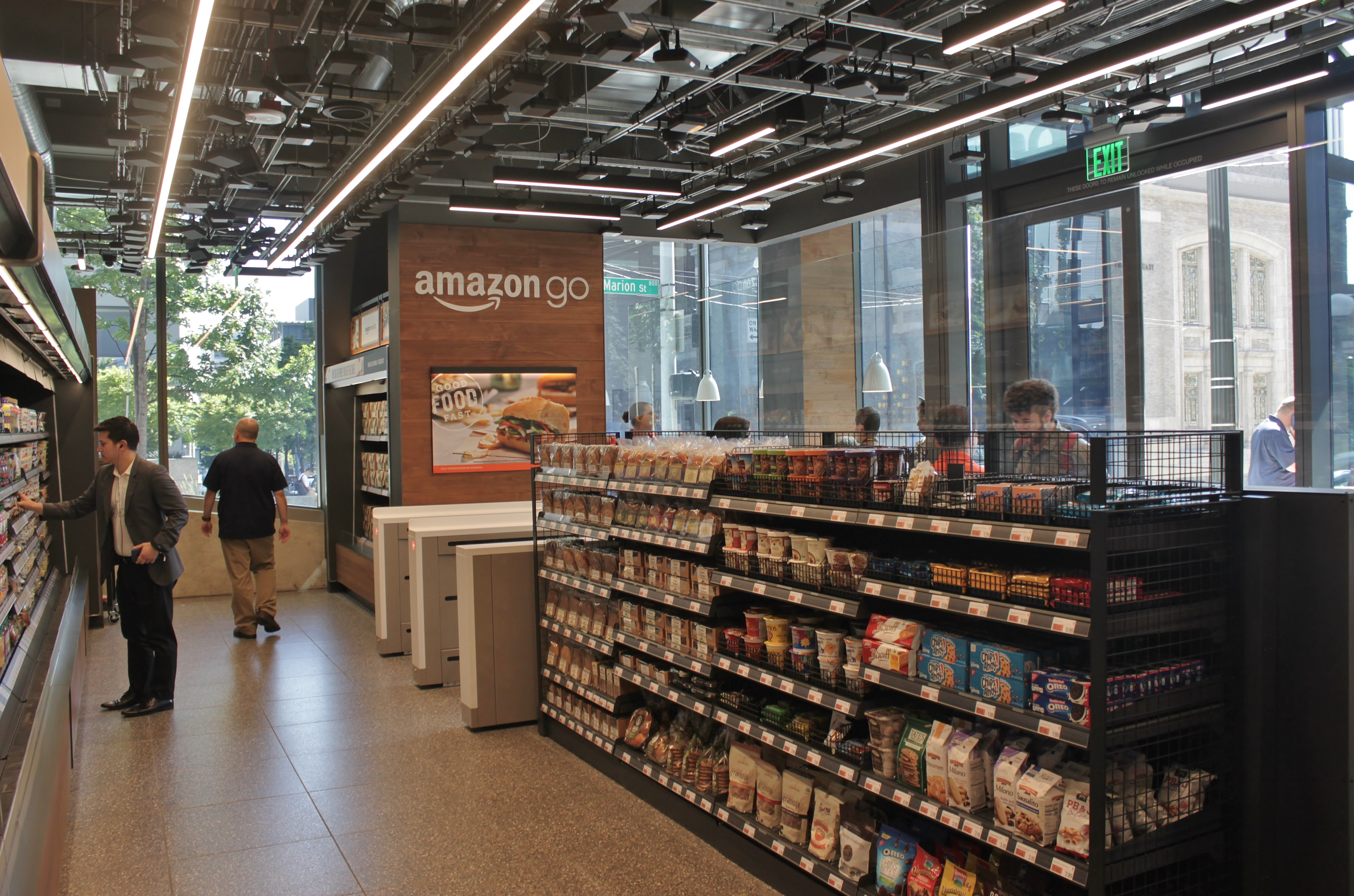
Cameras and sensors in the ceiling at this Amazon Go cashierless store track customers' choices and charge customers automatically via a mobile app.

Cashierless stores use cameras throughout the entire store. Customers either pay the bill on the way out, or register a smartphone on the way in so they can just walk out with their selected items.

As of April 2022, camera-based self-checkout machines are in use at some baseball stadiums in the United States. Systems manufactured by Caper Counters (acquired by Instacart) allow customers to put items in a designated area but not align them to expose the barcode.

== Advantages ==
One benefit to the retailer in providing self-checkout machines is in reduced labour costs: one attendant can often run four to six checkout lanes with the work of the cashier now being assumed by the customer. The size of a self-checkout machine is also smaller than a traditional checkout operated by a cashier; thus, a store can save space, which could be used for more shelves, display cabinets, or additional checkouts.

Costco began to institute self-checkout screens for their food courts in 2021 during the COVID-19 pandemic, allowing the food court's kitchen staff to focus solely on food preparation and service. The system requires payment via debit or credit card, ending the need for customers to exchange paper money or coinage with those employees, a potential vector for disease transmission.

Customers who do not want to interact with the cashier can use the self-checkout. Systems which allow payment through mobile payment or a digital wallet system allow the customer to purchase their items without having to touch any part of the system, outside the bagging area, though if they utilize returned reusable bags, it can be a completely touchless experience.

Self-checkout can also sometimes be faster than using a cashier lane. This can reduce the length of checkout lines and wait times. In a 2014 survey by NCR, 42% of customers said they liked the convenience of self-checkout, while 39% said it was faster than the cashier-assisted line. 90% of those surveyed responded as being users of self-checkout, with 7% of respondents saying they will always use self-checkout regardless of store lines and number of items. Respondents in Italy and Australia said they "always use self-checkout" at a rate of 13% and 9% respectively.

Another advantage is that self-checkouts can, if the necessary investment is made, provide a partly multilingual service. (It cannot be fully multilingual unless the goods themselves are labelled in all the relevant languages, which is often not the case.) For example, Tesco's Welsh stores can serve customers in both English and Welsh, whereas finding enough fluent Welsh-speakers as staff can be difficult because in some areas only a small proportion of local people have Welsh as their first language.

== Disadvantages ==
A 2021 report by Raydiant found that 67% of users have experienced at least one failure of a self-checkout system. 25% said they would avoid self-checkout because of prior bad experiences or slows. 65% worry about cleanliness. Many customers experience frustration at self-checkout when they need assistance.

=== Accessibility ===
In 2002, a study was carried out in which people with disabilities used self-checkout machines; this showed that existing checkout machines were not designed for accessibility. As of 2022, blind people, wheelchair users and others continue to struggle with the design of typical self-service machines which prevents them from shopping independently, and the problem is increasing as self-checkout machines are increasingly being installed. Although there are self-checkouts that have been designed for vision impaired and wheelchair users, they are not common, and disabled advocates are pushing for equal access. The US is considering regulations for accessibility of self-checkouts.

Self-checkouts have been criticised for difficulties with usability and technical problems, which can worsen customer experience. In 2023, the British retailer Booths announced that it would cease operating self-checkouts in its stores to improve customer service.

=== Noise pollution ===
Customers often complain about the repeated robotic-sounding messages coming from self-service checkouts. In 2015, supermarket Tesco replaced the robotic announcements with more human-sounding voice prompts in response to criticism.

Retailers have been known to use novelty voices for their self-service checkouts. For example, discount store Poundland has used the voices of Yoda, Elvis Presley, Count Dracula and Father Christmas on various occasions. In 2019, Marks & Spencer replaced its regular checkout announcers with the voices of judges from that year's season of Britain's Got Talent. The new voices led to an increase in customer complaints, with many questioning the appropriateness of some of the comments.

In some countries, voice prompts are not used at all by self-service checkouts.

=== Inventory record corruption ===
As customers are not trained to scan items, they may erroneously think that promotion items, such as 'buy one, get one' items, only need to be scanned once. It can also occur that the customer scans a different variety of a product that has the same price. Both of these scenarios would corrupt the inventory records of the retailer.

=== Theft and skip-scanning ===
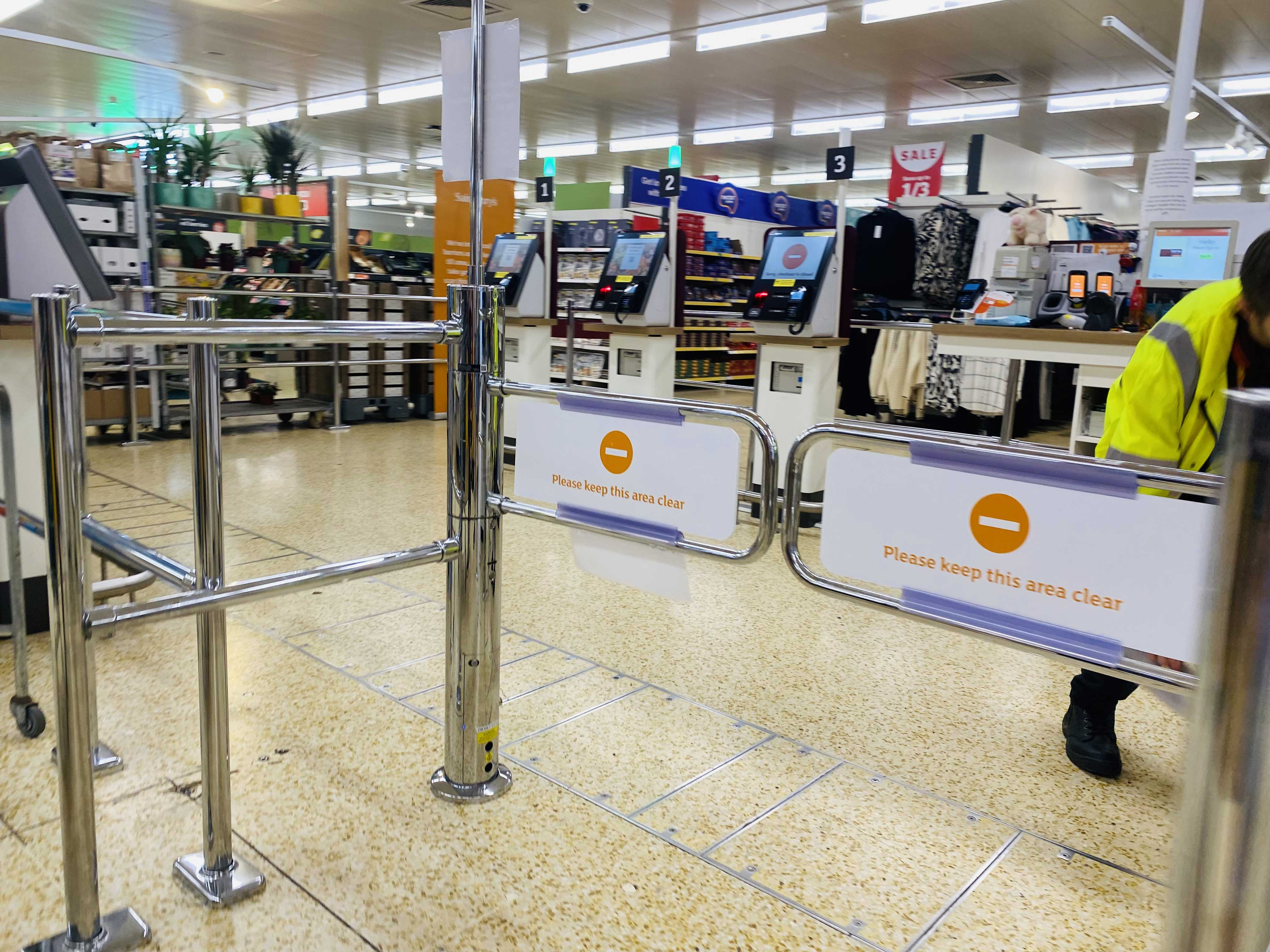
Security barriers in a British Sainsbury's shop require customers to scan receipts before being allowed to leave the premises.

Failure to scan all items is a form of shoplifting (theft). This can happen innocently when a customer scans only one item of a "buy one, get one free" promotion, or deliberately by a customer at a self-checkout. Another form is scanning something expensive while using the barcode for a cheaper product, either having peeled off a label from another item in the store, or held by the customer in their hand underneath the item they pass over the scanner. The simplest form of skip-scanning is to pass the item quickly across the optical reader without it registering the item, perhaps covering the barcode with one's hand or finger.

Retailers employ a variety of retail loss prevention methods. Increasingly, multiple cameras are being used to catch skip-scanning at all self-checkout locations, some monitored by loss prevention employees and others being fed to artificial intelligence systems which can detect skip-scanning movements or behaviors. For example, in 2020 Kroger signed up with new systems that detect a skipped scan and shows a video to the consumer who is given the opportunity to correct their mistake. If they repeat the action, then an employee is notified. Some retailers fit their self-checkout terminals with a CCTV system which displays the customer's face on a small video screen. The video is intended to deter shoplifters, but also has the potential to use an additional facial recognition system to identify known criminals. Some "missed-scan detection" systems have caused shoppers to feel embarrassed, harassed or accused, and honest shoppers to feel like they are being treated like thieves. It has even been suggested to avoid self-checkouts on the premise that one could be charged with theft even if one did not notice an item did not ring up correctly.

Since 2022, the British retailer Sainsbury's has introduced a receipt-scanning system in its stores. Self-checkout customers are held within a barriered area and are required to scan their printed receipt on an optical scanner to open an automatic gate, before they are permitted to exit the store. The system has been criticised for presuming customers to be potentially guilty of theft until they are able to prove their innocence by presenting a receipt.

A study revealed that self-checkout machines increased shoplifting, 6.7% of transactions had some amount of shrink (theft), 1 in 5 shoppers admitted to accidentally taking an item without paying for it, 1 in 7 admitted to purposely stealing items, and individuals with household incomes over $100,000 per year were more likely to steal than lower income brackets.

In response to a 120% increase in retail theft in 2023, some Target stores countered by limiting how many items customers can take through self-checkout, and some stores closed all their self-checkout lanes.

== Employment ==
Commentators have noted that the introduction of self-checkouts has enabled retailers to reduce in-store staffing levels, leading to lower levels of employment in the retail sector and poorer in-store maintenance.

== Regulation ==
A California appeal court confirmed in September 2013, with a 2–1 majority, a law banning the sale of alcohol through self-checkouts. The law requires alcohol only to be sold in face-to-face transactions with staff members, as is mandatory for cigarettes, spray paint and some over-the-counter medication. The California Grocers Association condemned the bill, stating how SCOs already lock out alcohol, requiring store staff to verify and approve purchases of alcohol. Similarly, the court said that a previous direction from the Department of Alcoholic Beverage Control was of no legal effect as it was not given for discussion or public comment.

In 2020, the Oregon AFL–CIO backed a proposed ballot measure in Oregon, US, to prohibit stores from operating more than two self-checkout machines.

== See also ==
- Automated retailing
- Cash register
- Point of sale
- Shadow work
