= Zoom Systems =

Manufacturer of automated retail kiosks

ZoomSystems specializes in the design, technology, software development, and operation of automated retail stores. ZoomSystems technology and services support automated, self-service retail stores called ZoomShops located in airports, malls, military bases and retailers.

ZoomSystems service offerings include location procurement, supply chain integration, inventory management, account management, creative services and project management. The company has partnered with well-known brands to open over 1,000 ZoomShops across the U.S., Europe and Japan. ZoomSystems has partnered with companies such as Best Buy, Apple, Macy's, Proactiv Solution, Procter & Gamble and Max Wellness.

Product types currently offered in ZoomShops include consumer electronics, cosmetics, wireless accessories and personal health products.

ZoomSystems corporate headquarters is located in San Francisco, California.

== History ==
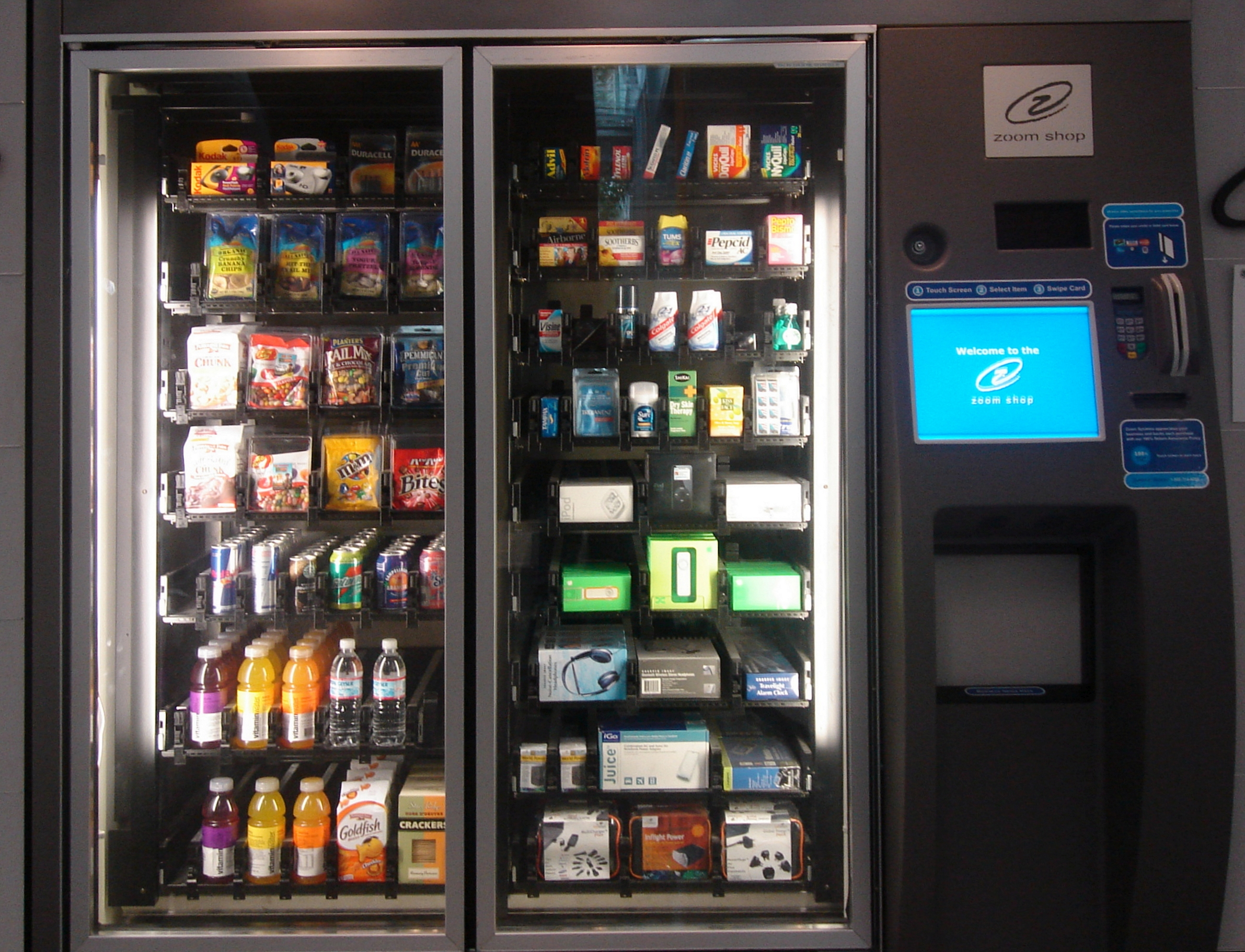
in 2006, San Francisco

In 2002, after several years of research and development to create a robotic kiosk, Gower Smith, a serial entrepreneur, founded ZoomSystems (New Zoom, Inc.). Two years later, in 2004, ZoomSystems partnered with Sanyo to develop an automated delivery hardware system and developed the software that operates each ZoomShop. The typical ZoomShop allows the consumer to purchase products using a touch screen interface. Once a product is purchased, the robotic arm delivers it into the pickup box and charges the consumer's credit card.

Each ZoomShop is designed to scale onto the Internet-ready, networked platform.

In October 2006, ZoomSystems entered into an agreement with Federated Department Stores to test more than 100 ZoomShops within retailer Macy's. After the test, Macy's decided to roll out e-Spot ZoomShops as a replacement for the Electronics department in over 400 locations. Over 100 Best Buy Express ZoomShops have rolled out into airports and malls across the U.S. carrying products from Apple and many other electronics brands.

In 2007 ZoomSystems was recognized by Deloitte as the number 2 fastest growing company in Silicon Valley. This was based on 5 year audited financials and the company continued to grow revenues over the following 5 years. Gower Smith handed off CEO responsibility in 2011 and he co-founded Swyft, Inc in 2013.

In September 2015, ZoomSystems entered into Chapter 11 bankruptcy protection. The documents were filed in the U.S bankruptcy court in San Francisco. In December 2015, ZoomSystems emerged from bankruptcy with new financing and under new ownership. In November 2017 Swyft, Inc acquired ZoomSystems.

== See also ==
- Automated retail
