= Amazon Fresh =

American grocery delivery service

- Type: Subsidiary
- Industry: Retail / Grocery
- Founded: 2007; 19 years ago
- Headquarters: Seattle, Washington, U.S.
- Areas served: Delivery: United States, Berlin, London, Milan, Munich, Rome, Tokyo, Singapore, Madrid, India; Stores: Chicago, London, Los Angeles, Philadelphia, Pittsburgh, Seattle, Washington, D.C., Bellevue, Paramus
- Parent: Amazon
- Website: amazon.com/fresh (US)

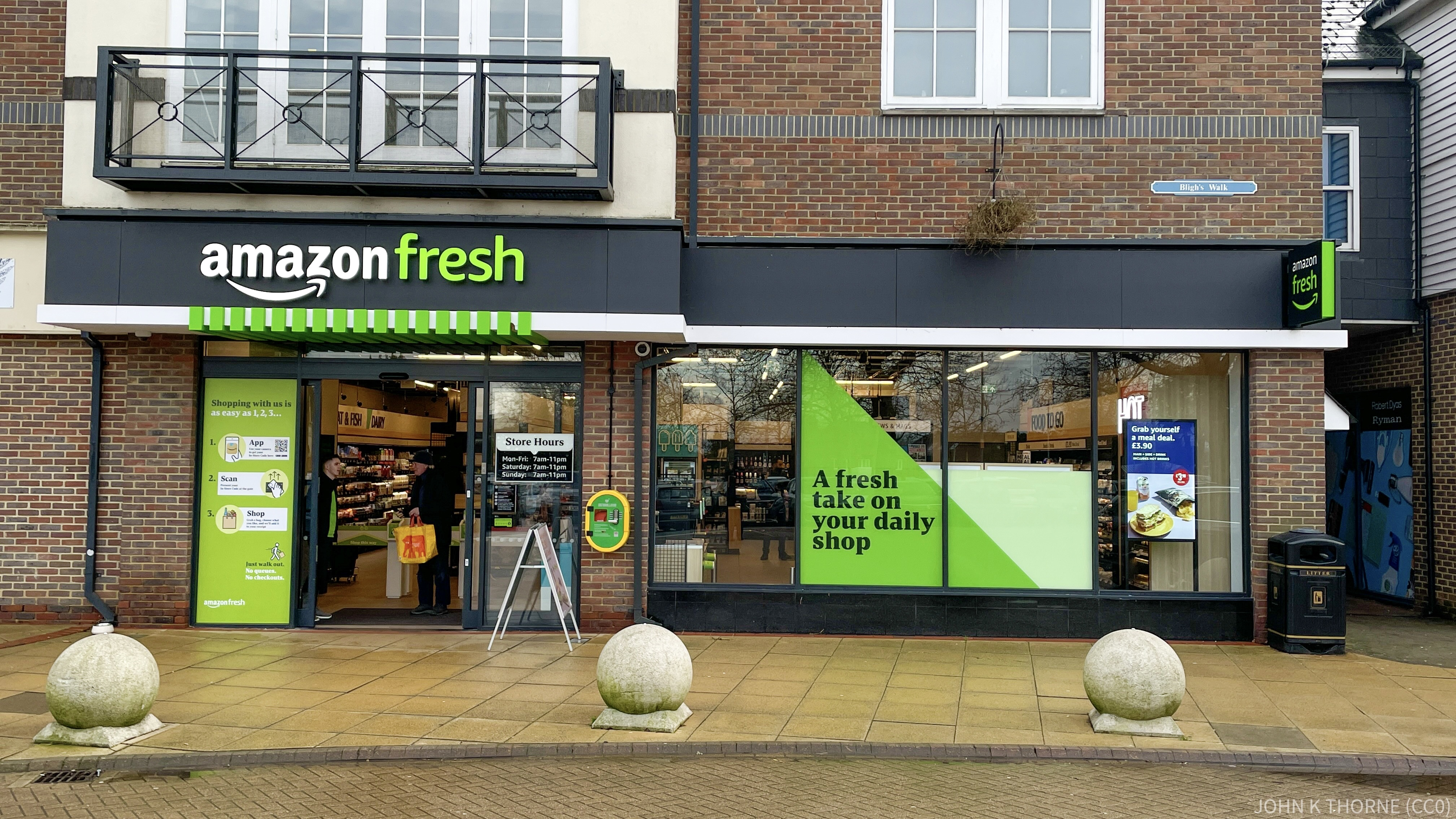
Amazon Fresh in Sevenoaks, England

Amazon Fresh is a subsidiary of the American e-commerce company Amazon in Seattle, Washington. It was a grocery retailer with physical stores in some U.S. cities, as well as in London and delivery services in the United States and various international locations. On January 27, 2026, it was announced that all physical locations would close (most of them by February 1, 2026), with some converting into Whole Foods Market stores, and the majority of the brand's operations transitioning primarily to online delivery of Amazon Fresh.

Amazon Fresh is currently a delivery service. In 2020 the concept changed to a chain of physical, cashier-less supermarkets, which have since shut down.

== Delivery service ==
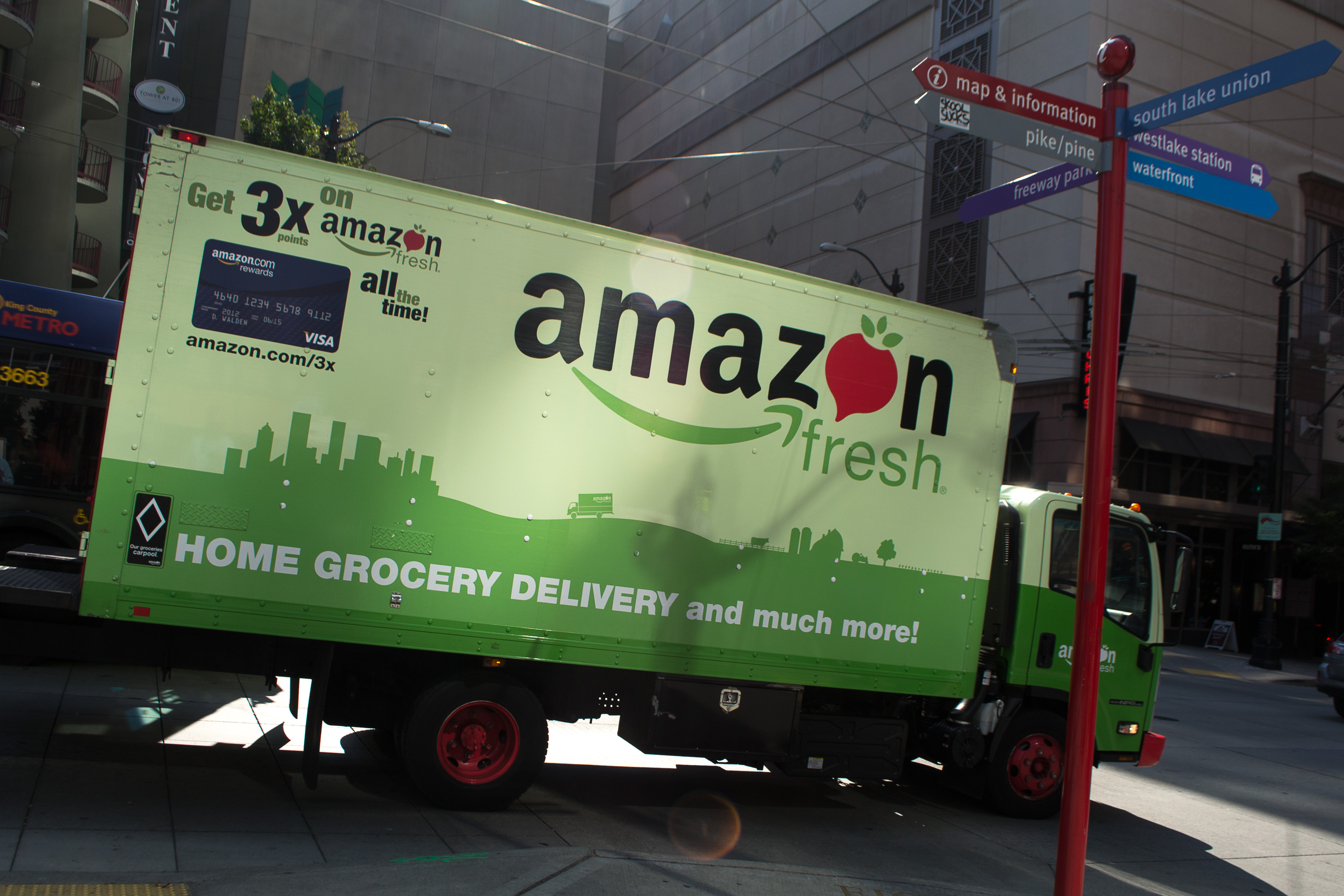
An Amazon Fresh delivery truck in Seattle

Amazon Fresh started in 2007 as an invite-only grocery delivery service in Washington. It rolled out its services gradually, targeting specific parts of various metropolitan areas and partnering with local speciality stores for delivery of local items. In March 2017, Amazon announced the beta launch of AmazonFresh Pickup, a drive-in grocery store for Amazon Prime subscribers where users shop online, reserve times to pick up the groceries, and have them loaded into their cars at the store. In the United Kingdom, Amazon signed a deal with the British supermarket chain Morrisons to provide supplies for Amazon Prime Pantry and PrimeFresh.

In Germany, Amazon Fresh launched in 2017, initially serving Berlin before expanding to Hamburg and Munich. Amazon discontinued the service in 2024. The company then begun offering groceries from Knuspr, initially for Prime subscribers in the Berlin area. In February 2025, grocery deliveries from Knuspr and Tegut became available to customers without Prime memberships.

On November 2, 2017, Amazon announced it was discontinuing its Fresh service to some smaller towns and cities in California, Delaware, Maryland, New Jersey, New York, and Pennsylvania.

== Physical, cashier-less supermarkets ==
In 2020, Amazon announced that they would use the name "Amazon Fresh" for their new chain of physical grocery stores in the Los Angeles and Chicago areas. The stores featured cashier-less (UK: till-less) shopping, with surveillance cameras and other technology ensuring that shoppers' purchases were automatically registered without needing to be individually scanned at a checkout counter. More than half use the "Just Walk Out" technology, while others use Dash Carts.

Dash Carts are shopping carts with a touchscreen, barcode scanner, cameras, and various sensors to count items placed and removed from the cart, allowing customers to skip conventional checkouts. The customer scans a QR code from their Amazon app to link their Amazon account so their purchase can be billed through the payment method linked in their Amazon account. The cart also has a weight sensor to weigh produce priced by weight.

Some Amazon Fresh stores used "grab and go" or "Just Walk Out" technology similar to that in Amazon Go stores, which tracks what customers take and place back. It allows customers to skip conventional checkouts while also eliminating the need to use Dash Carts. While presented to customers as an automated process, it relied on an India-based team of over 1,000 human reviewers to verify checkout accuracy. By the time they closed, there were no Amazon Fresh stores that use both "grab and go" and Dash Carts.

In April 2024, Amazon confirmed that the Just Walk Out technology would be phased out in favor of using Dash Carts at all U.S. Amazon Fresh locations. Amazon still plans to sell the Just Walk Out technology to other businesses, primarily smaller format stores.

Also in April 2024, Amazon began offering Dash Carts to other supermarkets, beginning with a small number of Price Chopper and McKeever's Market locations located in Kansas and Missouri. The objective was to turn the technology into a service business. It follows Amazon selling the Just Walk Out technology to other businesses in March 2020.

Due to criticism regarding Amazon Go stores not accepting cash, some Amazon Fresh stores also have checkout lanes for customers who want to pay with cash or do not have an Amazon account.

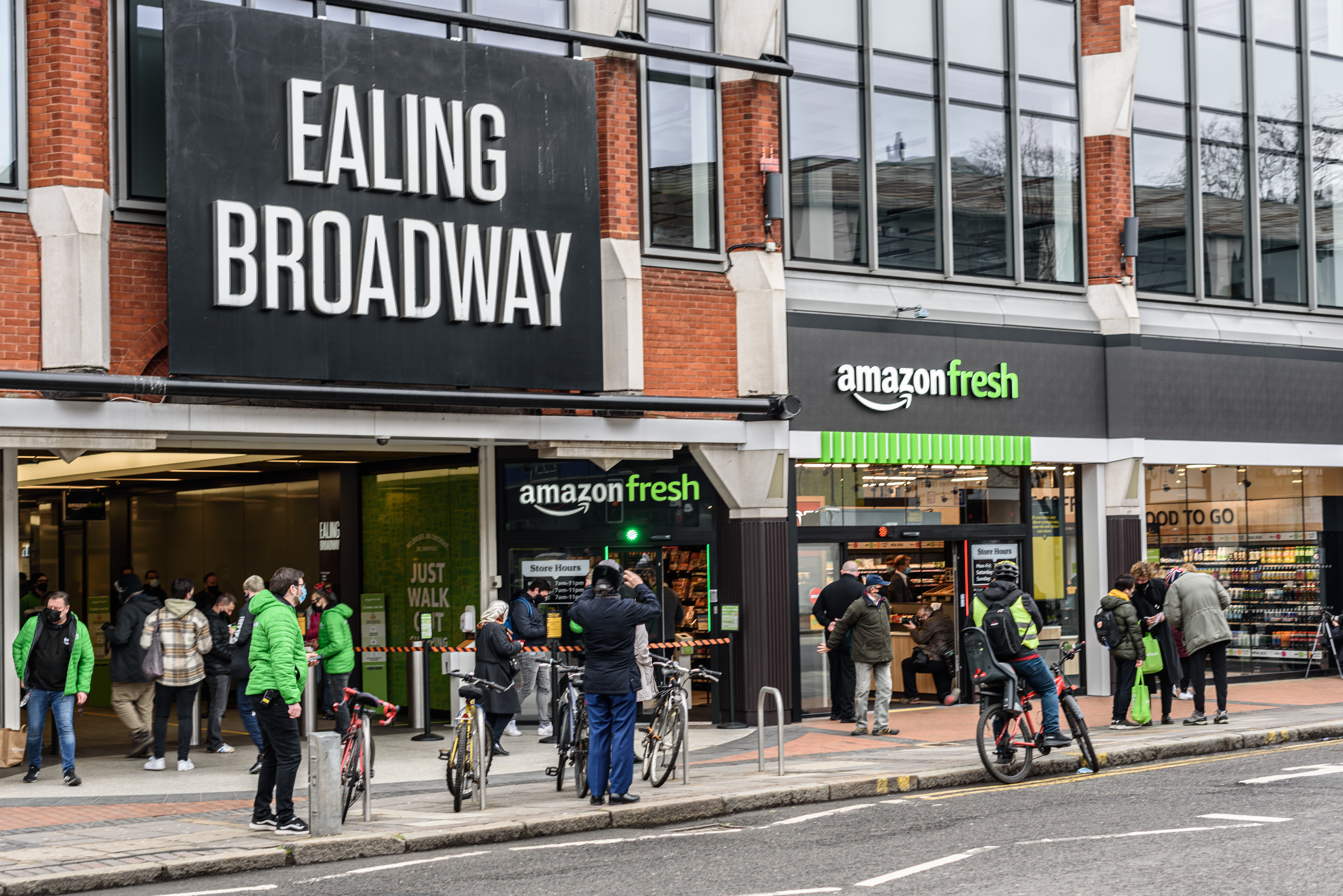
Amazon Fresh convenience store in London, United Kingdom

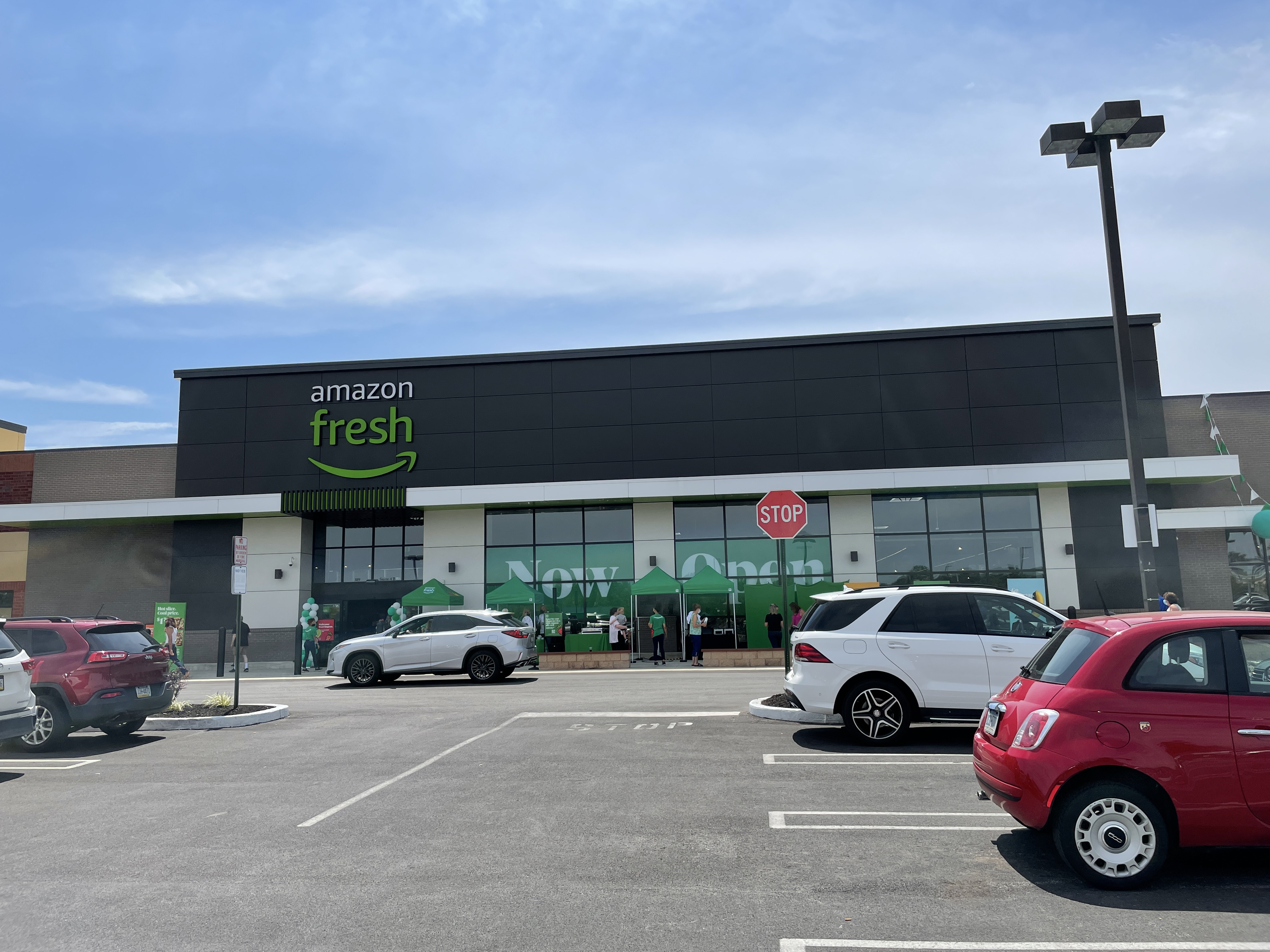
Amazon Fresh grocery store in Warrington, Pennsylvania

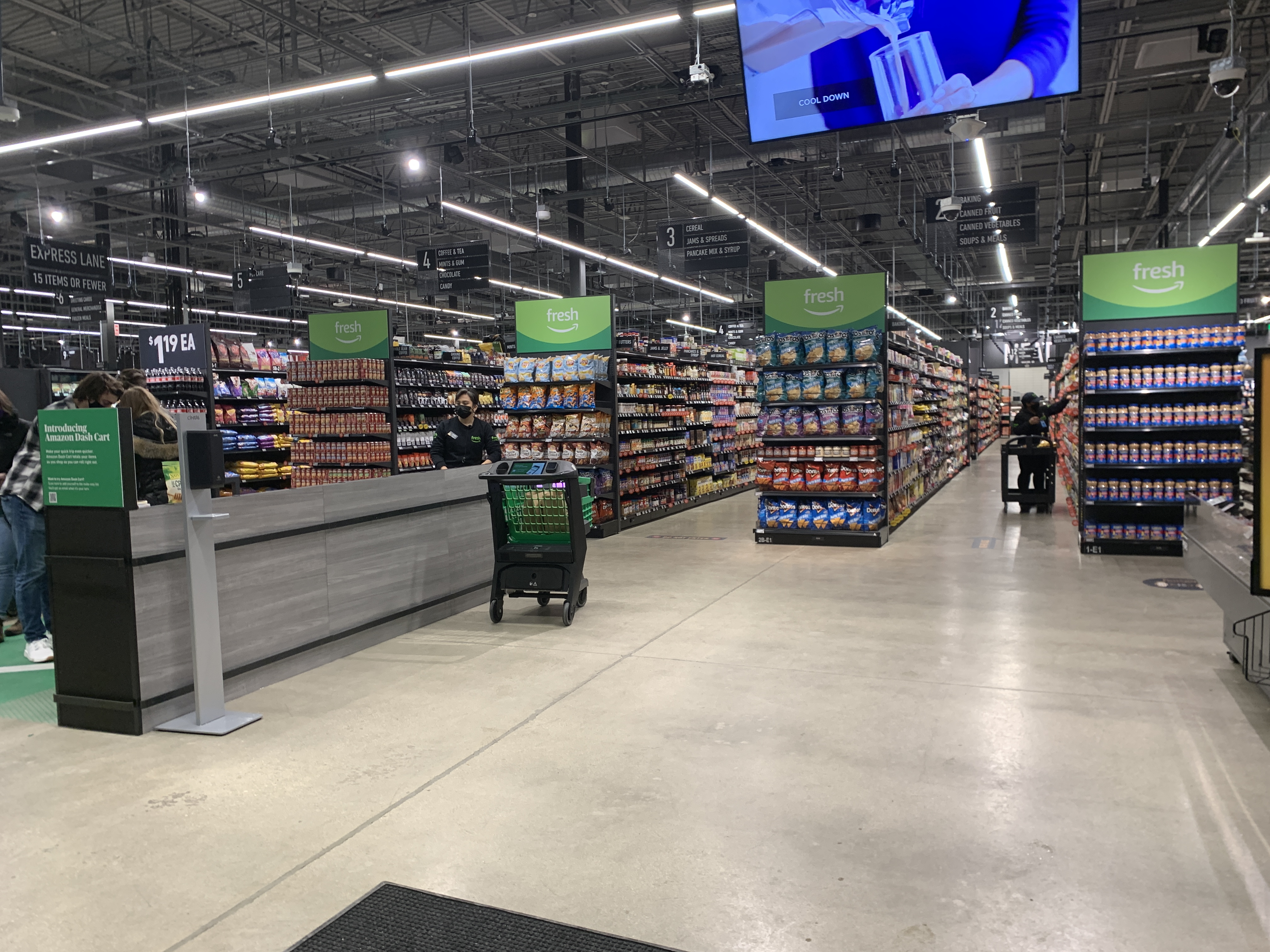
Amazon Fresh store in Naperville, IL, with a Dash Cart in the background

== Controversy ==
A study of shoppers found that while customers appreciated not having to wait in line, they felt "a sense of embarrassment and doubt due to tracking and the over-control generated" by the very visible surveillance cameras through the Amazon Fresh stores. The surveillance has been described as giving a "Big Brother" feel that challenges customers' trust. This has been proposed as a possible reason for why customers tend to go to other nearby stores instead of Amazon Fresh.

In 2021, a class-action lawsuit was filed against Amazon in New York for not alerting customers that it was monitoring their body shapes and palm prints. Employees have also complained about excessive surveillance of workers in Amazon Fresh warehouses.

== Locations ==
The first Amazon Fresh grocery store opened to the public on September 17, 2020, in the Woodland Hills neighborhood of Los Angeles. By July 2022 Amazon Fresh had 38 locations in the states of California, Illinois, Pennsylvania, Virginia, Maryland, Washington, Washington, D.C., and New York/New Jersey. On March 4, 2021, the first Amazon Fresh store in Europe was opened, in the Ealing Broadway Centre shopping mall in Ealing, West London, and by June 2022, Amazon Fresh had 17 locations in London, UK.

On November 17, 2022, it was reported that the development of all upcoming Amazon Fresh grocery stores had been indefinitely paused “pending evaluation of the operation.” In February 2023, two Amazon Fresh storefronts that had not yet opened in Brookfield and Westport Connecticut were abandoned and sold to Big Y Supermarket. In July 2023 three London locations were closed, including the first to be opened. The company continued to state that it would continue to grow despite the closures and underwhelming sales figures. Since 2023, more Amazon Fresh locations have begun to open. In September 2025, Amazon announced all 19 UK locations would close by the end of 2025 after less than five years of operation, with five locations being converted into Whole foods stores. In February 2026, it was announced that Tesco had acquired five former Amazon Fresh stores in London, which are due to reopen as Tesco Express branches.

== Product lines ==
Amazon Fresh sold grocery items and a subset of items from the main Amazon.com storefront. Items ordered through Amazon Fresh were available for home delivery on the same day or the next day, depending on the time of the order and the availability of delivery slots.

Amazon Fresh operated independently of Whole Foods Market, which is also owned by Amazon. They had separate facilities and separate inventories that they sell. Market research from Amazon showed that customers at Amazon Fresh tended to have lower incomes and were more likely to be Hispanic or particularly Asian than customers of Whole Foods.

== See also ==
- List of supermarket chains in the United States
