= Automated retail =

Self-service standalone kiosks

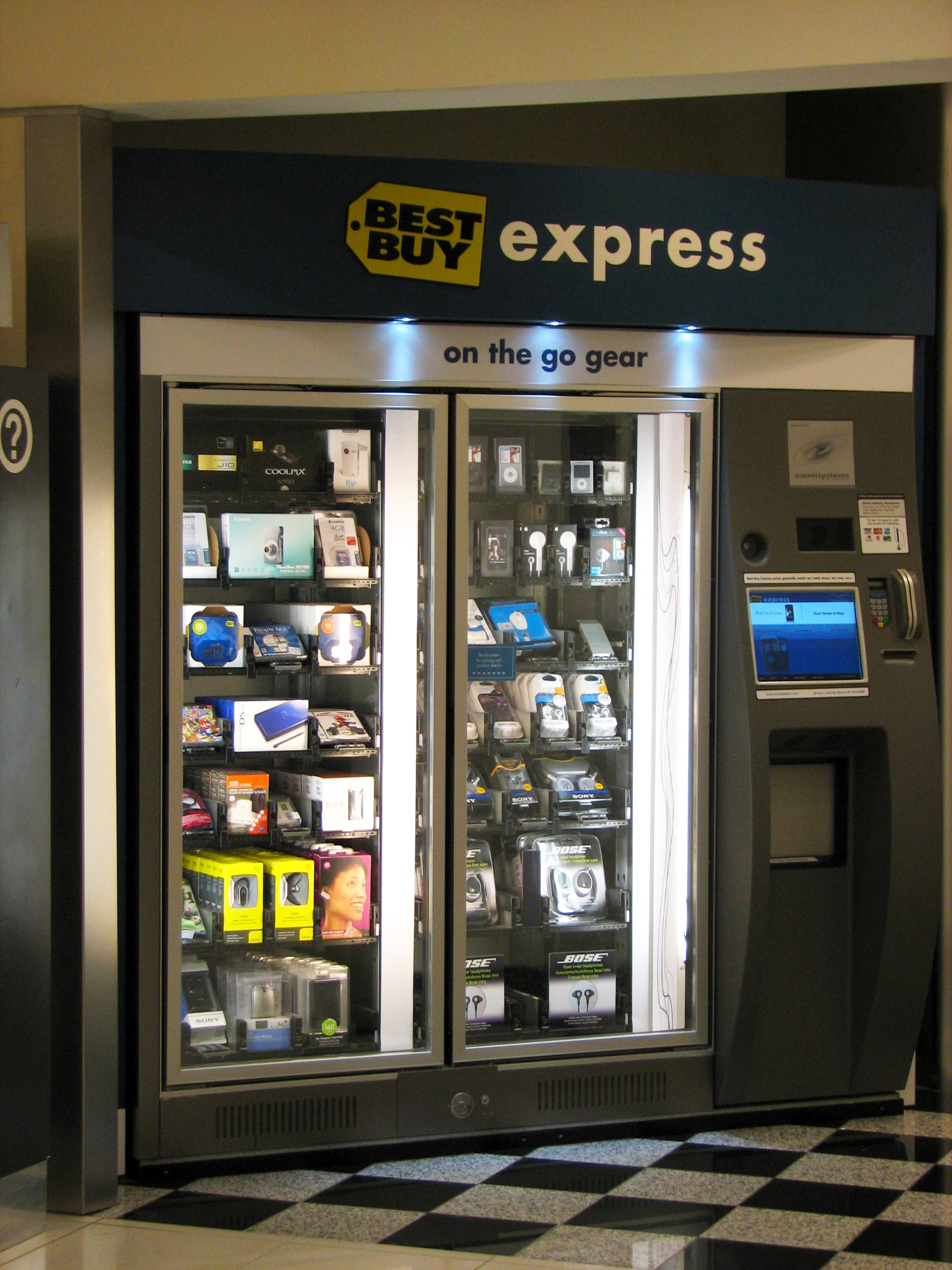
A Best Buy Express vending machine by Zoom Systems at an airport terminal, stocked with electronics

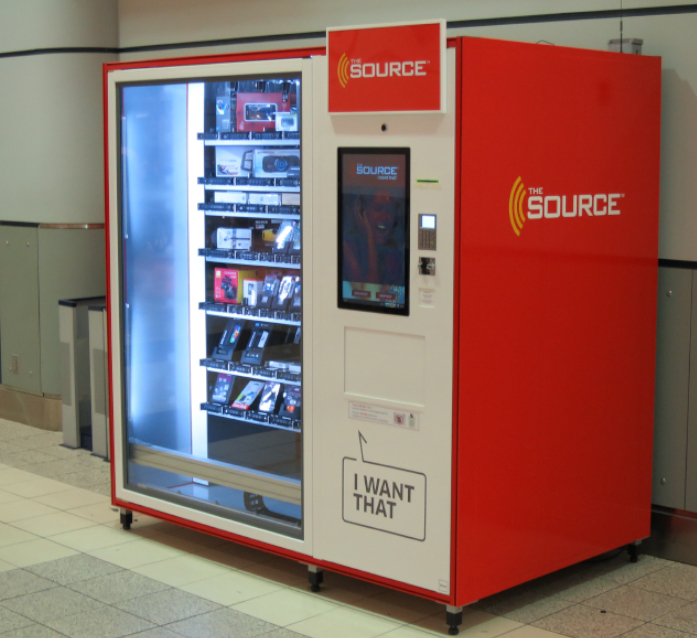
An automated retail kiosk for The Source, dispensing electronics at an airport

Automated retail is a category of self-service, standalone kiosks that function as fully automated retail outlets. They rely on integrated software systems to perform many of the tasks traditionally handled by human staff, such as product selection, payment processing, and inventory tracking. These kiosks are typically situated in high-traffic locations such as airports, shopping malls, resorts, university campuses, and transit hubs, where convenience and accessibility are critical factors.

Consumers often browse and select products using a touchscreen interface that operates similar to an ecommerce website, pay for purchases using a credit or debit card, mobile wallet, or contactless payment methods. Once the transaction is approved, products are dispensed through a system other than gravity fed drop systems, often via a robotic arm inside the kiosk.

These software integrations, the consumer experience and the delivery mechanisms are what differentiate automated retail stores from vending machines.

ZoomShops and Redbox were examples of companies that pursue an automated retail business model.

== See also ==
- Automat
- Automated convenience store
- Automated restaurant
- Automated teller machine (ATM)
- Business process automation
- Cashierless store
- Self-checkout
- Types of retail outlets
- Vending machine
