= Robomart =

Robotics company

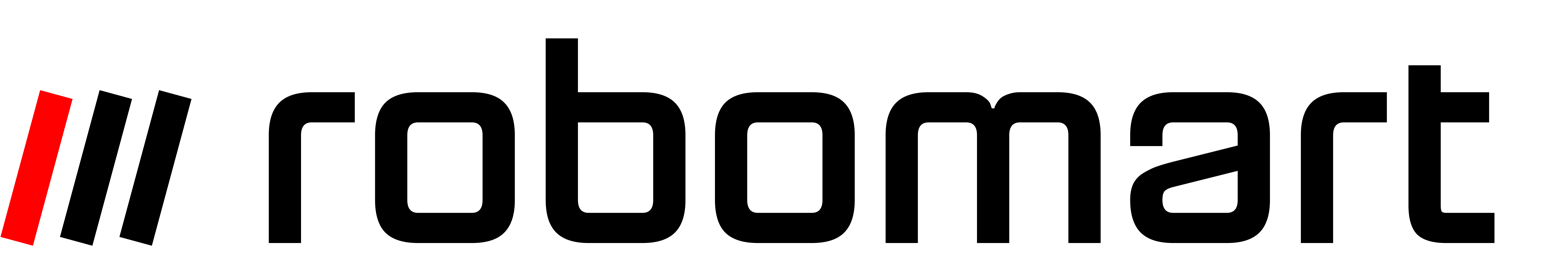
- Website type: Private
- Founded: January 2018; 8 years ago
- Headquarters: Santa Monica, California, U.S.
- Area served: West Hollywood, CA
- Founders: Ali Ahmed; Emad Suhail Rahim; Tigran Shahverdyan
- Key people: Ali Ahmed (CEO); Tigran Shahverdyan (CTO); Emad Suhail Rahim (CSO); Christian Huff (CFO)
- Industry: Retail
- Services: Robotics
- Website: robomart.ai

Robomart is an American technology company headquartered in Santa Monica, California that builds autonomous smart shops for cafes, ice cream parlors, and quick-service restaurants. The company’s white label platform gives retailers the option to expand their footprint at a significantly lower cost than traditional brick-and-mortar real-estate.

Robomarts are equipped with a proprietary checkout-free system, temperature controlled compartments, sensors for autonomous operation, and external cameras for added security.

The company licenses its technology and white label applications to retailers who manage their fleet of stores and deploy them to their consumers’ locations. After consumers have taken goods from the robomart, their order is automatically calculated, their card on file is charged and they are sent a receipt.

The company has announced partnerships with Unilever, Mars, and Fatty Mart.

== History ==
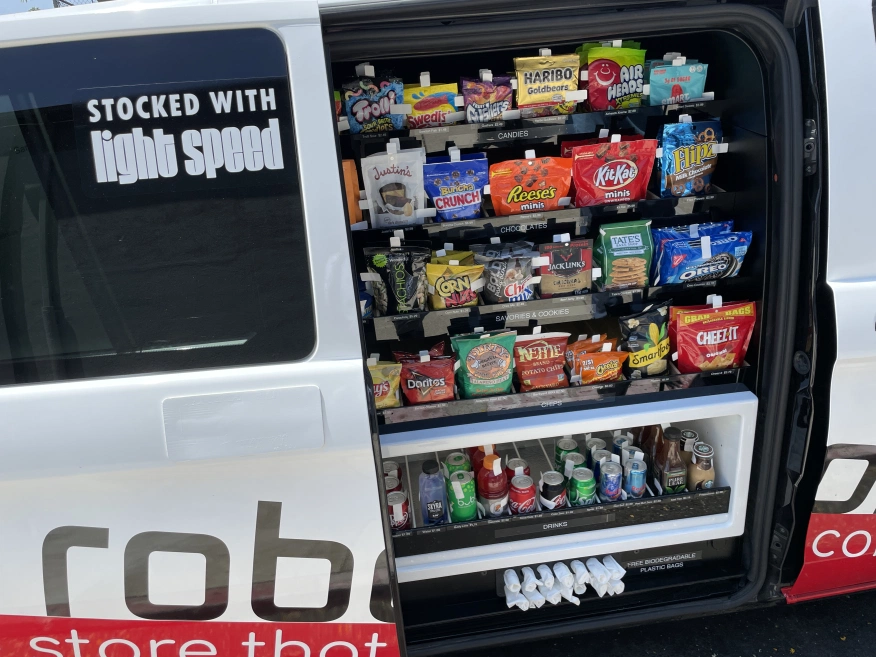
The inside of a Robomart in West Hollywood, California

Robomart was founded by Ali Ahmed, Tigran Shahverdyan, and Emad Suhail Rahim. The company debuted at CES 2018 where it unveiled its concept of a self-driving store.

At GITEX 2018 the company presented its first functional prototype of a fully driverless Robomart. At the 2019 Consumer Electronics Show the company demonstrated the technology behind its autonomous stores and checkout-free shopping experience.

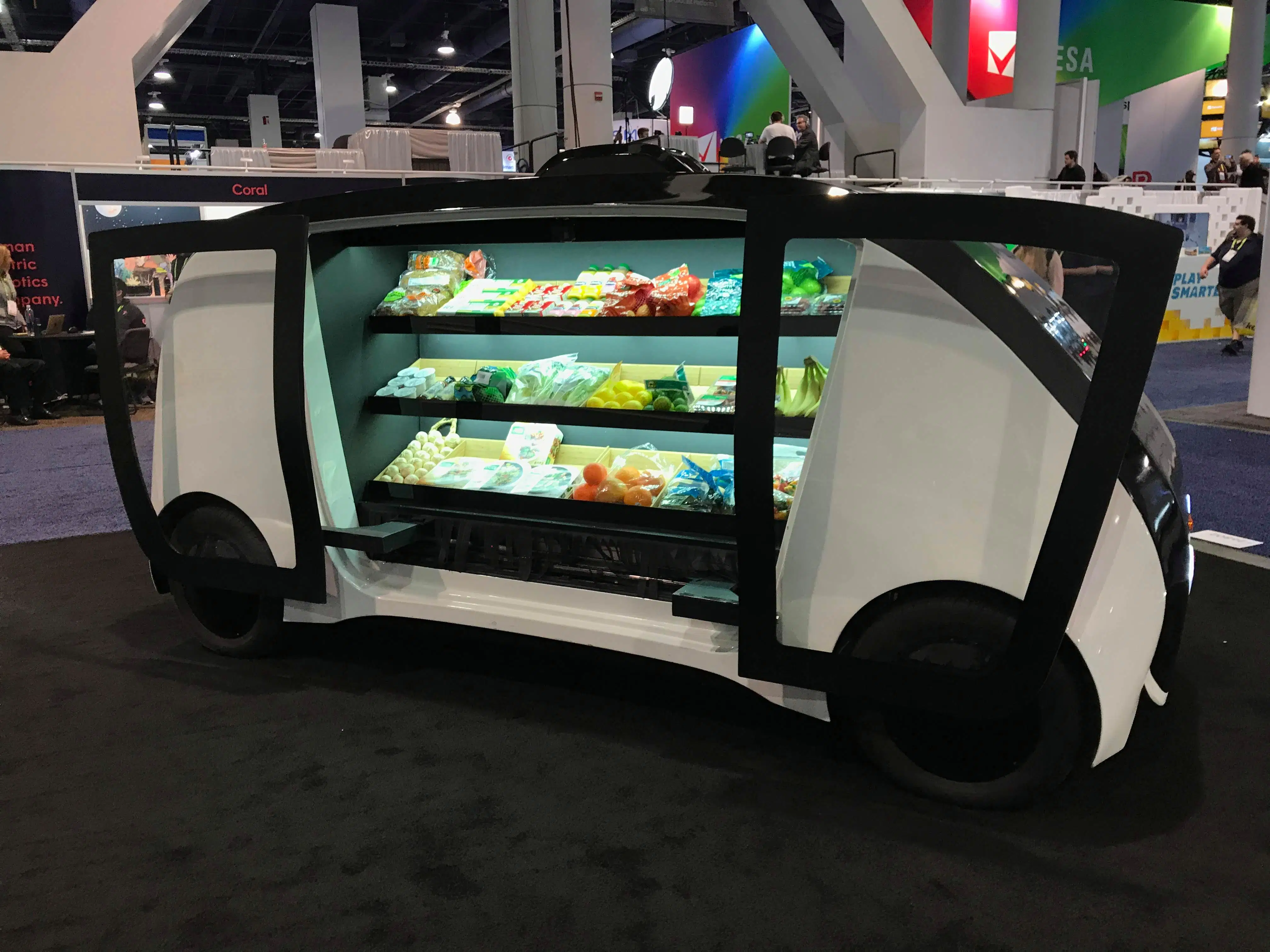
Robomart prototype at CES 2019

In January 2019, Robomart announced its first partnership with U.S. grocery chain Stop & Shop to test its driverless stores.

In December 2020, Robomart deployed the Pharmacy Robomart in a trial in West Hollywood.

In June 2021, the company launched its commercial service with a fleet of Pharmacy and Snacks Robomarts operating within West Hollywood and Central Hollywood.

In August 2023, Robomart announced a $2 million seed round, putting its to-date funding at $3.4 million.

== Partnerships ==
In September 2019, Robomart partnered with Avery Dennison to source the RFID tags used to enable its checkout-free shopping experience. In December 2020, Robomart partnered with Zeeba Vans to provide vehicles for its growing fleet. In June 2021, Robomart partnered with REEF Technology to provide inventory management and restocking services. In addition, REEF's Light Speed grocery division serves as the first merchant selling products through Robomart.

== Products ==
The company currently offers three Robomart types. the frozen Robomart that stocks ice cream, the refrigerated Robomart that stocks perishable foods, and the ambient Robomart that stocks shelf-stable goods.
