= Cashless society =

Economic state

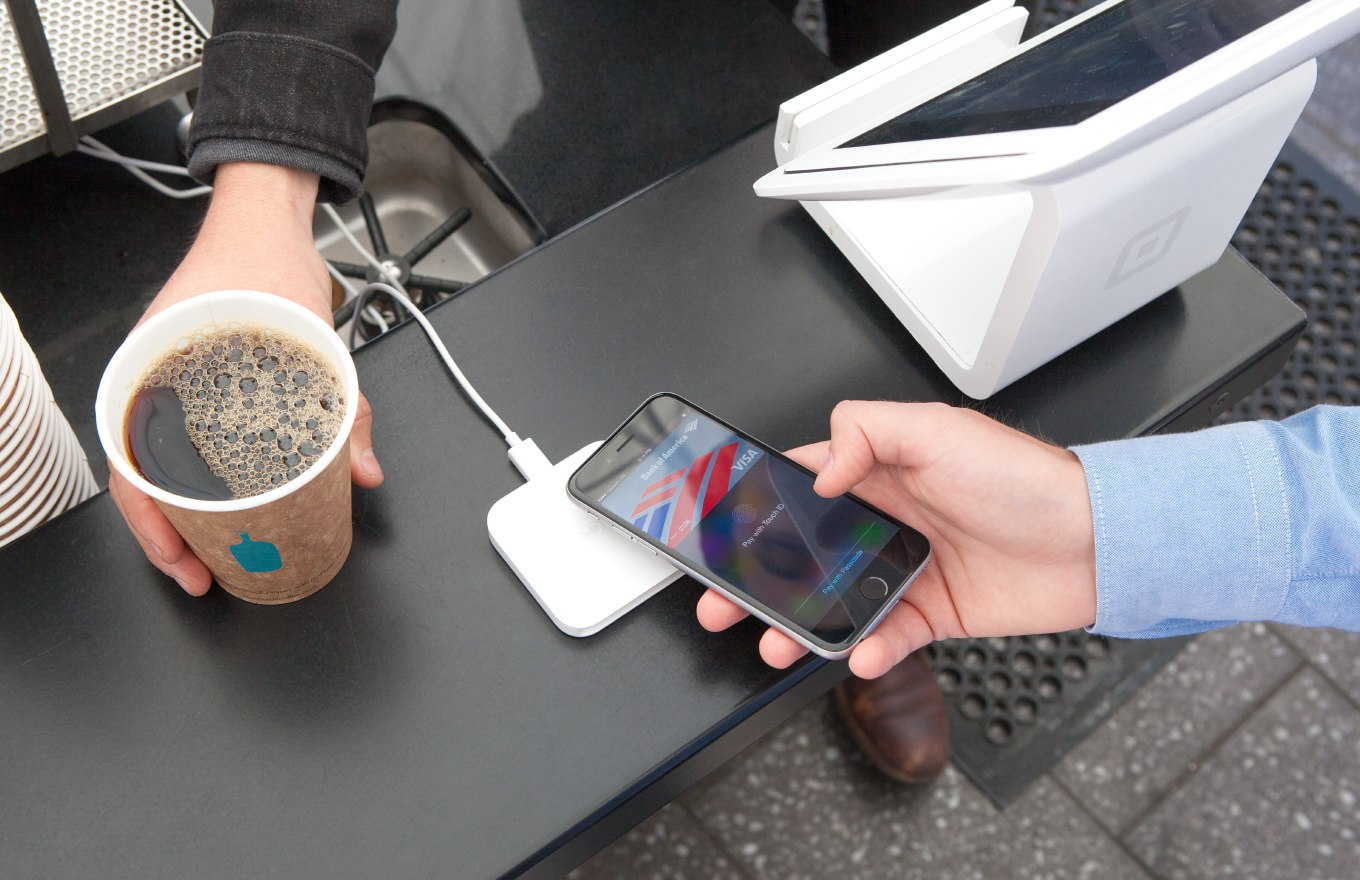
A consumer pays for coffee using Apple Pay on their iPhone and a Square reader.

In a cashless society, financial transactions are not conducted with physical banknotes or coins, but instead with digital information (usually an electronic representation of money). Cashless societies have existed from the time when human society came into existence, based on barter and other methods of exchange, and cashless transactions have also become possible in modern times using credit cards, debit cards, mobile payments, and digital currencies such as bitcoin.

Such a concept has been discussed widely, particularly because the world is experiencing a rapid and increasing use of digital methods of recording, managing, and exchanging money in commerce, investment and daily life in many parts of the world, and transactions which would historically have been undertaken with cash are often now undertaken electronically. Some countries now set limits on transactions and transaction values for which non-electronic payment may be legally used.

== History ==
Early ideas of a cashless economy were expressed by Edward Bellamy in his novel Looking Backward. The trend towards the use of non-cash transactions and settlement in daily life began during the 1990s when electronic banking became common. By the 2010s, digital payment methods were widespread in many countries, with examples including intermediaries such as PayPal, digital wallet systems such as Apple Pay, contactless and NFC payments by electronic card or smartphone, and electronic bills and banking, all in widespread use. At this point cash had become actively disfavored in some kinds of transaction which would historically have been very ordinary to pay with physical tender, and larger cash amounts were in some situations treated with suspicion, due to its versatility and ease of use in money laundering and financing of terrorism. Additionally, payment with a large amount of cash has been actively prohibited by some suppliers and retailers, to the point of coining the expression of a "war on cash".

The 2016 United States User Consumer Survey Study claims that 75% of respondents preferred a credit or debit card as their payment method while only 11% of respondents preferred cash. Since the founding of both companies in 2009, digital payments can now be made by methods such as Venmo and Square. Venmo allows individuals to make direct payments to other individuals without having cash accessible. Square is an innovation that allows primarily small businesses to receive payments from their clients.

By 2016, only about 2% of the value transacted in Sweden was by cash, and only about 20% of retail transactions were in cash. Fewer than half of bank branches in the country conducted cash transactions. The move away from cash is attributed to banks convincing employers to use direct deposit in the 1960s, banks charging for checks starting in the 1990s, banks launching the convenient Swish smartphone-to-phone payment system in 2012, and the launch of iZettle for small merchants to accept credit cards in 2011.

== Research ==
Among the first sociological studies about cashless societies, see Aldo Haesler, Sociologie de l'argent et postmodernité, Geneva & Paris 1995.

On 8 November 2016, India announced that its existing 500- and 1,000-rupee banknotes would cease to be legal tender. These denominations accounted for 86% of the value of currency in circulation. A study published in 2020 estimated that the resulting cash shortage reduced aggregate employment and economic output by at least two percentage points relative to their estimated paths without demonetization in the final quarter of 2016. Economic output was estimated using satellite data on nighttime lighting. Districts more severely affected by the cash shortage also experienced slower growth in bank lending and more rapid adoption of electronic payments. The negative economic effects diminished over the following months.

A 2023 study of firms subject to value-added tax in the Indian state of West Bengal found an increase in reported sales and tax payments during the two quarters following the announcement of demonetization. The researchers suggested that the shift toward electronic payments may have improved the ability of tax authorities to identify tax liabilities and enforce compliance.

== Measurement ==
=== Share of payments ===
Estimated share of payments done by cashless methods (from studies published 2008–2013)
Country	%
Singapore	61
Netherlands	60
France	59
Sweden	59
Canada	57
Belgium	56
United Kingdom	52
United States	45
Australia	35
Germany	33
South Korea	29
Spain	16
Brazil	15
Japan	14
China	10
UAE	8
Taiwan	6
Italy	6
South Africa	6
Poland	5
Russia	4
Mexico	4
Greece	2
Colombia	2
India	2
Kenya	2
Thailand	2
Malaysia	2
Saudi Arabia	1
Peru	1
Egypt	1
Indonesia	0
Nigeria	0

A common measure of how close to a "cashless society" a country is becoming is some measure of the number of cashless payments or person to person transactions that are completed in that country. For instance, the Nordic countries conduct more cashless transactions than most other Europeans. Levels of cash in circulation can widely differ between two countries with a similar measure of cashless transactions.

Across the 33 countries covered in the European Payment Cards Yearbook 2015–16, the average number of card payments per capita per year is 88.4. In comparison, the average Dane makes 268.6 card payments each year, the average Finn 243.6, the average Icelander 375.5, the average Norwegian 353.7, and the average Swede 270.2. This makes card payments in the Nordics two-and-a-half to four times higher than the European average.

— Euromonitor International

=== Amount of cash in circulation ===
Even though a cashless society is widely discussed, most countries are increasing their currency supply. Exceptions are South Africa whose supply of banknotes fluctuates wildly compared to most nations, and Sweden which has significantly reduced its currency supply since 2007. China's currency has decreased from 2017 to 2018

Banknotes and coins in circulation at end of 2018
Value per inhabitant (USD)	Code	Exchange rate EOY2018	Value per inhabitant (local currency)	Country or region
$10,194	CH	0.9842	10,033	Switzerland
$8,471	HK	7.8319	66,346	Hong Kong SAR
$8,290	JP	109.9127	911,000	Japan
$6,378	SG	1.3617	8,684	Singapore
$5,238	US	1.0000	5,238	United States
$4,230	XM	0.8734	3,695	Euro area
$2,404	AU	1.4166	3,405	Australia
$2,003	KR	1,116.0961	2,236,000	Korea
$1,924	CA	1.3629	2,623	Canada
$1,683	SA	3.7500	6,311	Saudi Arabia
$1,417	GB	0.7813	1,107	United Kingdom
$1,009	RU	69.6203	70,234	Russia
$825	CN	6.8778	5,672	China
$682	SE	8.9562	6,111	Sweden
$680	MX	19.6438	13,365	Mexico
$513	AR	37.6680	19,318	Argentina
$327	BR	3.8812	1,271	Brazil
$311	TR	5.2915	1,646	Turkey
$230	IN	69.6330	16,042	India
$205	ZA	14.3750	2,945	South Africa
$196	ID	14,410.4803	2,827,000	Indonesia

=== Amount of cash in circulation (historical) ===
The amount of cash in circulation was much lower in past decades in all countries except Sweden. The oldest comparative figures at Bank for International Settlements were from 1978 and only including the USD and 10 other currencies.

Banknotes and coins in circulation per inhabitant in USD at exchange rate
Country	2018	2008	1998	1988	1978	2018/1978	annual
Switzerland	$10,194	$6,371	$3,065	$2,688	$2,008	5.08	4.15%
Japan	$8,290	$7,436	$3,728	$2,275	$724	11.45	6.28%
United States	$5,238	$2,927	$1,679	$870	$428	12.24	6.46%
Germany	$4,230	$3,324	$1,759	$1,300	$680	6.22	4.68%
Belgium	$4,230	$3,324	$1,244	$1,127	$1,229	3.44	3.14%
France	$4,230	$3,324	$804	$700	$605	6.99	4.98%
Italy	$4,230	$3,324	$1,205	$747	$394	10.74	6.11%
Netherlands	$4,230	$3,324	$1,272	$1,189	$679	6.23	4.68%
Canada	$1,924	$1,444	$685	$554	$320	6.01	4.59%
United Kingdom	$1,417	$1,168	$726	$470	$326	4.35	3.74%
Sweden	$682	$1,553	$1,082	$1,063	$772	0.88	-0.31%

== Legal status ==
=== Denmark ===
All shops are required by law to accept coins and banknotes as legal tender. Particularly since the 2020s and COVID-19 pandemic, organizations have advocated for making the acceptance of cash as payment voluntary.

=== Italy ===
Italian Law, since 01/01/2023, prohibits cash transactions for the value of 5000 euros or more between natural persons or legal entities. This ban even applies to artificially split transfers, each below the threshold.

Businesses and providers of goods and services must accept electronic payments by at least one credit card and one debit card, with exceptions due to objective technical impossibility. The law also applies to e-money instruments. From 30/06/2022, the refusal of a qualifying card payment is punished by an administrative fine of 30 euros plus 4% of the amount of the payment refused.

=== United Kingdom ===
A number of businesses in the United Kingdom may be forced to accept coins and banknotes as a number of MPs noted in April 2025 that these steps may be necessary to prevent vulnerable groups, such as people with learning disabilities, domestic abuse victims and the elderly, from becoming excluded from community spaces such as leisure centres, theatres and public transport.

=== United States ===
A few states and cities in the United States require the ability to pay with cash for certain transactions. In Massachusetts, there is a law passed in 1978 which says that no businesses in the state of Massachusetts can "discriminate against a cash buyer by requiring the use of credit". It was the only U.S. state to have such a law until March 2019, when New Jersey passed similar legislation; car rentals, parking garages, and airport stores have exceptions under the legislation. The bill came shortly after the city of Philadelphia passed a similar law. San Francisco has also banned cashless stores. Rhode Island became the third U.S. state to outlaw cashless businesses when its ban took effect on 1 July 2019 along with Colorado which also has a law that banned cashless shops since 2021. A requirement in New York City that businesses accept cash took effect on 19 November 2020. Similar laws exists in Washington D.C. (December 2020), Seattle (June 2023), and Detroit (September 2024). New York enacted a law in November 2025, effective in March 2026, whereby cash must be accepted as a payment option at "food stores and retail establishments".

== Advantages ==
=== Reduced business risks and costs ===
Cashless payments eliminate several risks, including counterfeit money (though stolen cards are still a risk), theft of cash by employees, miscounting of change, and burglary or robbery of cash. The costs of physical security, physically processing cash (withdrawing from the bank, transporting, counting) are also reduced once a business goes completely cashless, as is the risk that the business will not have enough cash on hand to make the change. Cashless payments are also known to be more efficient and safer compared to cash payments, and they can always be traced back afterwards as well.

=== Transaction speed ===
Restaurant chain Sweetgreen found cashless locations (with customers using payment cards or the chain's mobile app) could process transactions 15% faster.

=== Elimination of high-denomination notes for purposes of reducing criminal activity ===
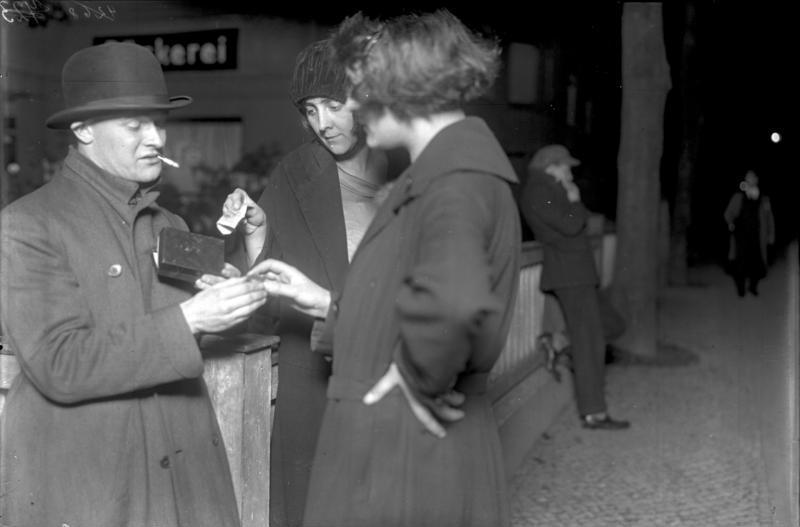
Cash being used to purchase cocaine in Berlin, 1929.

One significant societal advantage cited by proponents is the difficulty of money laundering, tax evasion, performing illegal transactions, and funding illegal activity in a cashless society. Many countries have regulated, restricted, or banned private digital currencies such as Bitcoin, partly to prevent illegal transactions. Large amounts of value can also be stored in real estate, antiques, or commodities like diamonds, gold, silver, and platinum.

A study published in 2018 using European data found lower levels of value-added tax (VAT) evasion where payment cards were used more extensively for purchases. Greater use of cards to withdraw cash from automated teller machines (ATMs), by contrast, was associated with higher levels of VAT evasion.

A 2024 study of the 27 European Union member states examined the relationship between cash payment limits and tax evasion. A statistical model based on the tax gap per capita found no statistically significant association with any of the cash payment limits examined. In a second model, based on the total tax gap and accounting for factors such as taxation, tax system efficiency and card use, only the category of cash payment limits above euro 5,000 was statistically significant.

In August 2014, Uruguay introduced VAT rebates for purchases made by card. A study published in 2025 found that the reform led to an immediate 50% increase in the number of card transactions but detected no statistically significant effects on firms’tax compliance.

Some have proposed a "reduced cash" system, where small bills and coins are available for anonymous, everyday transactions, but high-denomination notes are eliminated. This would make the amount of cash needed to move large amounts of value physically awkward and easier to detect. Large notes are also the most valuable to counterfeit. The United Kingdom declared only banknotes of £5 or less were legal tender near the end of World War II on 16 April 1945 due to fear of Nazi counterfeiting, although a £5 note then had a purchasing power equivalent to £187 in 2025, over five times larger than the current largest note of £50. On 14 July 1969, the federal government of the United States declared that banknotes of over $100 in value would remain legal tender, but any notes in government hands would be destroyed and that no new notes of those denominations would be printed in the future, although such notes were last printed in 1945, 24 years earlier. Canada did the same thing with the CAD$1000 banknote beginning on 12 May 2000. Sweden printed 10,000kr banknotes in 1939 and 1958, but declared them invalid after 31 December 1991. Singapore announced on 2 July 2014, that they would no longer produce the SGD$10,000 banknote, and it was no longer issued as of 1 October 2014. The European Central Bank no longer issues the €500 denomination euro banknotes as of 27 April 2019.

=== Better collection of economic data ===
Rather than conducting "costly and periodic" surveys and sampling of real-world transactions, "real data" collected on citizens' spending can assist in devising and implementing policies that are deduced from actual data. With recorded financial transactions, the government can better track the movement of the money through financial records which enables them to track the black money and illegal transactions taking place in the country.

=== Easier consumer budgeting ===
As digital payments are made, transactions are kept in records. Cashless payments facilitate the tracking of spending expenditure and record the movement of money. Having recorded transactions, it can help citizens to refine their budget more efficiently because people can see their recorded transactions in their bank account and know where their ingoings and outgoings are occurring.

In a 2022 survey of Dutch consumers, 74% of respondents who preferred cash to debit cards reported spending less when paying in cash. Better oversight of personal expenses was the most commonly cited reason for this preference, identified by 88% of these respondents.

== Disadvantages ==
=== Lack of privacy ===
In a digitized economy, payment made will be recorded digitally (cash payments are also typically recorded). With digitally-recorded transactions, certain institutions such as the seller may have potential access to this information (though the record is likely to be anonymous to the seller). Such transactions could allow businesses a way to build an understanding of their customers based on observed spending patterns.

The issue of data mining also comes into place as countries head towards a cashless society. Cashless transactions leave a record in the database of the company as one makes a payment, and this information becomes a way for the prediction of future events. Through a large number of records, data mining then allows the organization to compile a profile of an individual through its records in the database.

Going all-digital, these data retrieved from transactions lead to widespread surveillance where individuals can be tracked by both corporations and the government. These records might also be available to hackers and could be made public after a data breach.

=== Transmission of disease via cash and PIN pads ===
Cash provides a good home for disease-causing organisms (i.e. Staphylococcus aureus, Salmonella species, Escherichia coli, COVID-19, etc.). However, cash has been found to be less likely to transmit disease than commonly touched items such as credit card terminals and PIN pads. Such concerns prompted the German central bank, Deutsche Bundesbank, to state that "Cash poses no particular risk of infection for the public".

=== Problems for the unbanked ===
Cashless systems can be problematic for people who currently rely on cash, who are concentrated in certain populations such as the poor, disabled, elderly, undocumented immigrants, and youth. Electronic transactions require a deposit account (in a bank or other deposit-taking financial institution) and some familiarity with the payment system. Many people in impoverished areas are underbanked or unbanked. In the United States, almost one-third of the population lacked the full range of basic financial services in 2012. In 2011, an FDIC survey found that approximately one-quarter of households whose annual income was less than $15,000 had no bank account. Nationwide, 7.7% of people in United States did not have bank accounts, with levels over 20% in some cities and rural counties, and over 40% in some census tracts, as of 2016.

In 2022, 98% of Dutch consumers had access to a payment account, according to European Central Bank data. A separate survey conducted in the Netherlands that year found that 28% of respondents stated that they could not do without cash. This proportion rose to 45% among respondents with limited digital skills, 36% among those with disabilities and 35% among those experiencing financial difficulties. The researchers noted that these responses could reflect barriers to using alternative payment methods, personal preferences or the need to make payments to people who only accept cash.

As part of its Smart Nation initiative, Singapore has been moving towards a cashless economy. In 2017, 14.4% of the country's population was over 65 years old, and the majority of seniors still used cash as their only method of payment. Not used to digital payment methods, troubleshooting issues such as managing lost cards or passwords and managing their expenses can create potential trouble for anyone transitioning from cash.

=== Digital fraud ===
When payment transactions are stored in servers, it increases the risks of unauthorized breaches by hackers. Financial cyber attacks and digital crime also form a greater risks when going cashless. Many companies already suffer data breaches, including of payment systems. Electronic accounts are vulnerable to unauthorized access and transfer of funds to another account or unauthorized purchases.

Attacks on or accidental outages of telecommunication infrastructure also prevent electronic payments from working, unlike cash transactions which can continue with minimal infrastructure.

=== Coordination problems ===
Thus far, cashless electronic payment systems have been predominately provided by a variety of different private sector companies. With so many different cashless payment options, there can be coordination problems as to which payment methods buyers and sellers will adopt and accept. If buyers prefer to use one type of payment method while sellers prefer another, the volume of transactions can be affected due to miscoordination. Such concerns are part of the debate as to whether the government should get involved with the issuance of central bank digital currency (CBDC).

=== Centralised control ===
If governments were to monopolize cashless payment systems, e.g. by the issuance of CBDC, then in addition to tracking all transactions, the government would also be able to:

- Enforce a transaction tax on every person-to-person payment
- Eliminate the storage of cash as a means to escape nominal negative interest rates, which are used to fight deflation by discouraging savings (most effective if combined with bans on barter, private currencies like bitcoin, and storage of precious metals like gold). Certain types of money could be set to "expire" and be worthless if not spent in specific ways or by specific times. This is also possible with cash, if the government allows high inflation or lets its currency undergo a devaluation.
- Governments could conduct more effective mass surveillance and quickly prevent certain individuals from buying anything or earning any money
- Restrict the type of consumer goods that can be purchased with a certain amount of money (and parents might be able to do the same with allowance money)

=== Reliance on Telecommunications Infrastructure ===
Digital transactions generally require a connection via internet or other telecommunications network, preventing the use of digital payment in remote areas without connection to such networks. Commerce can also come to a halt when economies relying such networks go down, as happened in Belet Hawo, Somalia during battles in July 2025.

A 2026 working paper issued by the National Bureau of Economic Research found that nearly half of respondents in a United States survey had been unable to use their preferred electronic payment method during a power outage. Surveys conducted in the United States, Spain and Sweden also found that respondents with larger cash holdings were more likely to complete purchases using cash when electronic payments failed.

Following the Russian invasion of Ukraine, the country's central bank established a network of more than 2,000 bank branches equipped with alternative power supplies and backup communications to maintain banking services during prolonged blackouts. In a 2025 article, Birch and Grosclaude proposed retaining cash alongside multiple independent electronic payment systems, with provision for payments that can be made offline.

=== Criticism in Sweden ===
Sweden is exceptional in that the amount of cash in circulation has reduced substantially. Swedish society changed profoundly from 2000 to 2017 due to attempts to replace all cash with digital payment methods. The concept of cash-free bank branches began in Sweden between 2000 and 2005, with a cashless branch being a step towards an upcoming closure of that branch. From around 2008, Swedish banks began giving special hardware to their customers that could be used to process financial transactions (like digital payments of invoices) from home. People still had the choice to use cash, however, and those who wished to do so could still do business in cash at the bank offices that remained.

This trend began around 2008, and peaked in connection with the 2015–17 exchange of all Swedish coins and banknotes (except for the 10 kronor coin). According to the banks' head offices, cash was no longer required as withdrawals and deposits were possible (in limited amounts) through machines. But for "safety regulations", the maximum amount a bank customer could withdraw was about 5,000 to 10,000 SEK per week, and similar "security rules" for deposits were established as well. Later, all the major regular banks with branches began an enforced process of either closing down branches or making them "cash-free". Today very few cash handling bank branches still exist.

The limited availability of cash in Sweden has caused difficulties for smaller boutiques, shops, and convenience stores, which depend on cash, as they can no longer deposit their daily takings or obtain any change. Non-profit organisations, which are very common in Sweden, have also experienced an outsized impact. When they organise events and want to take entrance fees or sell items or snacks, many do not carry cash, often there are problems depositing larger amounts of cash into bank accounts, and card reader agreements in banks are expensive. In response, Swedish banks have introduced a mobile telephone payment system known as Swish. But this system has suffered from many problems.

The banks (and initially media as well) have dismissed complaints about the change as "a problem for elderly people" only, essentially claiming that some were only struggling to learn new technology, rather than being unhappy with a totally new transaction method. Opponents of the change, however, contend that the technological excitement has changed too much too fast, saying that many dangers lurk in the reeds. Concerns have been expressed about a rising number of fraudulent transactions, and the fast development of quantum computers contributes to fears of hacking within the system. The debate about a cashless Sweden became more complicated when the Swedish authority Myndigheten för Samhällsskydd och Beredskap—MSB or "the Authority for Community Protection and Preparedness" in their writing "Om Kriget Eller Krisen Kommer" ("If war or crisis comes") contained a list of items to store permanently at home to be prepared, which includes "cash in small denominations". A wave of negative criticism followed in Sweden from experts outside the banking sphere expressing their concerns.

The former head of police, Björn Eriksson, started a movement in the spring of 2016 known as Kontantupproret or "The Cash Petition". This movement has quickly grown to a considerable size, with many contributors describing troubles caused by the increasingly hostile attitude expressed by banks against cash. The range of complaints covers a wide variety of issues. For instance, the TV3 figure Robert Aschberg became annoyed after having paid at a chemist with the Swish system via his mobile phone, because he almost immediately received an advertisement from the same pharmacy, raising privacy concerns. Svante Linusson, professor of mathematics and Centre Party candidate, said that "the discontinuation of cash undermines our democracy, freedom and security".

A billiard club in Malmö was almost forced to close after their bank of 20 years refused to acknowledge them as a customer after the billiard club refused any other payments but cash (the bank claimed that the cash is not traceable in their crime investigation activities). A traditional summer market in northern Lycksele went into bankruptcy after a computer error. Because people had been required to pay with phones (Swish) and cards, there was not enough money available for them to conduct business in their market.

In general, new money laundering laws require evidence of the sources for higher amounts of cash. The banks in Sweden blame EU laws, but the EU laws allow transactions of below €15,000, while Swedish banks require evidence and can refuse to accept or confiscate cash without a lower limit and have high requirements of documentation.

== See also ==
- Cashierless store
- Cheque § Declining use
- Contactless payment
- Digital banking
  - Online banking
- Global economy
- Digital currency
- Virtual currency
- Legal tender
- Mass surveillance
