= Cashierless store =

Store that does not contain a checkout

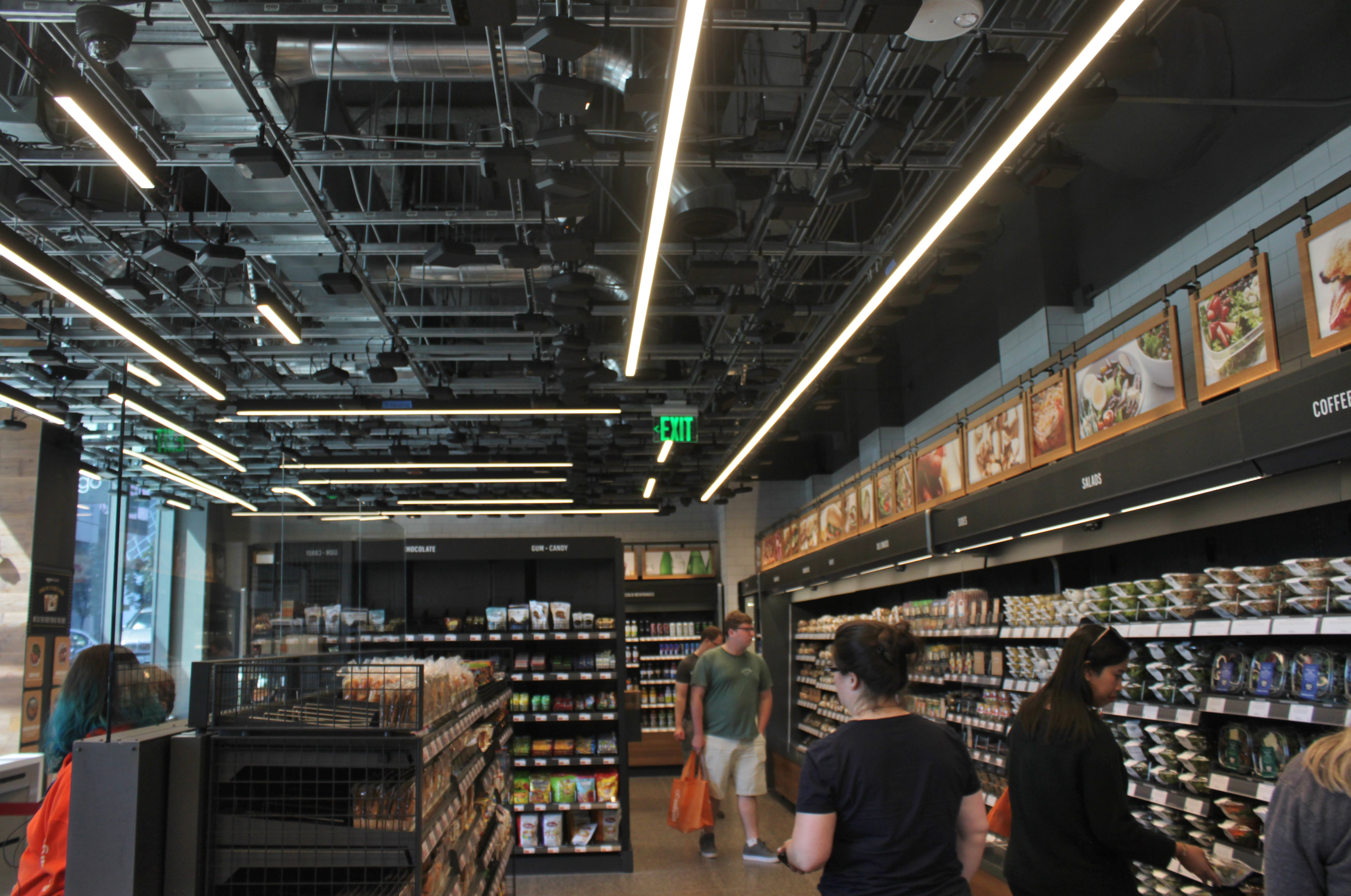
Various cameras and sensors being used in the ceiling of an Amazon Go store

A cashierless store (also called a till-less store, checkout-free store or just walk out store) is a store which allows customers to buy products and leave without having to wait in line and pay at a checkout. Cashierless stores can currently be found in the United States, Asia, Europe, the Middle East, and Africa.

== Process ==
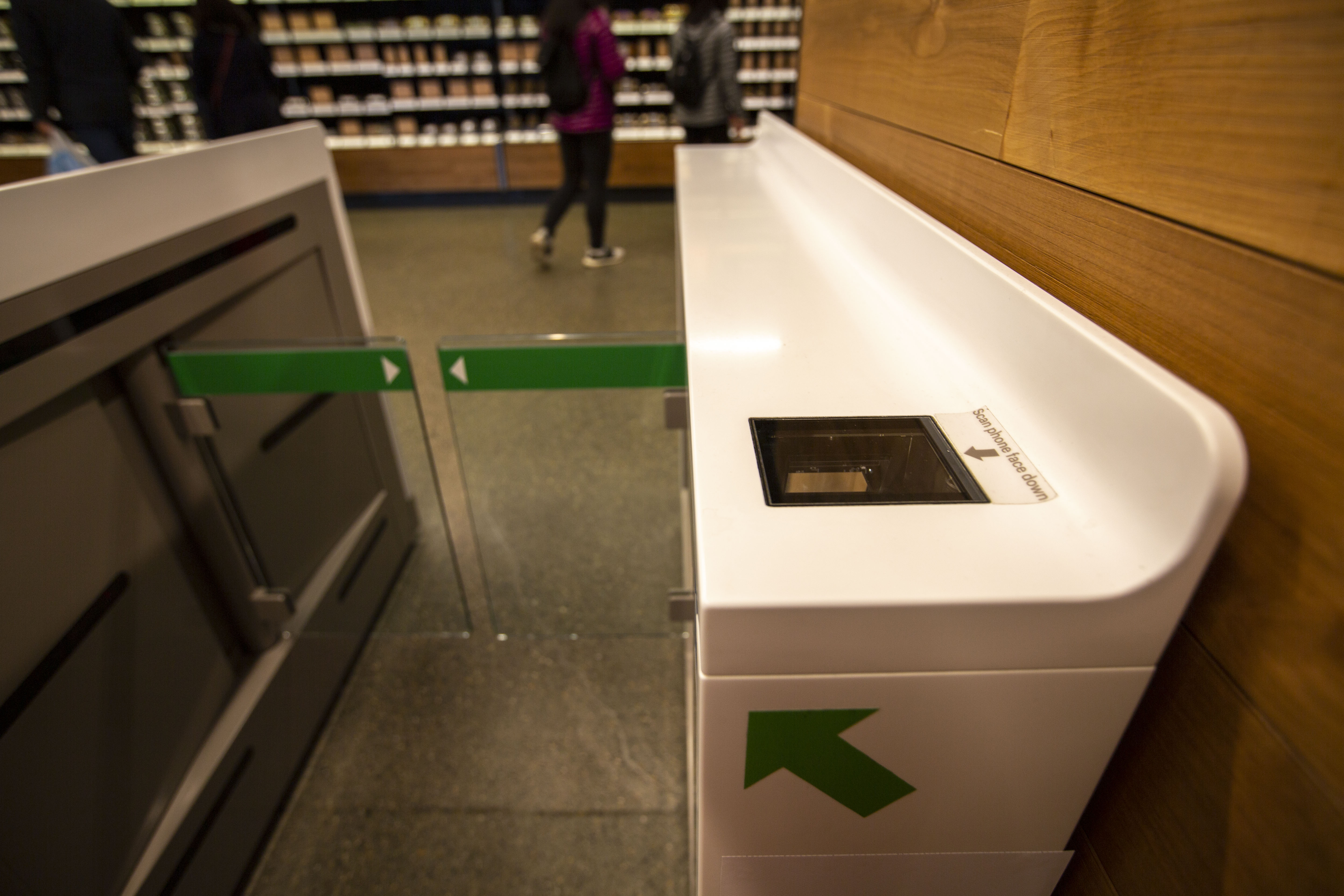
Entrance to an Amazon Go store, requiring the customer to scan their phone

The process of shopping in a cashierless store can be broken down into four phases:

- In the before-purchase phase, an app may need to be downloaded.
- In the check-in phase, a bar code from the store’s app may need to be scanned in order to enter the store.
- In the product selection phase, products can usually be selected without taking any preceding actions, but some stores require customers to scan a bar-code on the product or tap a screen to select products.
- In the check-out phase, stores utilize sensor fusion and deep learning for computer vision to allow customers to walk out with their products without waiting in line at a register.

== Technology ==
=== Sensor fusion ===
In cashierless stores, most systems mark each customer with defining features and use cameras and pressure sensors together to keep track of where each customer goes and takes from the shelves. Sensor fusion gathers information from different sensors and compiles it to create an accurate representation of what is happening and the relative positions of objects in an area at a specific time. Sensor fusion is often more accurate than single sensors since the separate measurements can be used to double-check and narrow the margin of error.

=== Deep learning for computer vision ===
Deep learning for computer vision is used in cashierless stores to track customers and products. Computer vision is the computer’s ability to interpret real-life images and video feeds. Computer vision uses deep learning to make interpretations of the real world. Deep learning allows computers to learn from large amounts of data similarly to how the human brain would. Deep learning for computer vision tracks customers and products using object detection, multitarget tracking, and pose estimation. Object detection is the process of identifying objects within an image. Object detection is useful in identifying instances when a customer picks up and puts down an object, or for identifying the products on each of the shelves. Multitarget tracking approximately locates a moving person within consecutive frames of images. Multitarget tracking allows stores to keep track of each customer and their actions, like what products they picked up and put back and when they entered and exited the store. Pose estimation is the process of using an image to track a person using the positions of their body parts, like their head, hands, and wrists. Similar to multitarget tracking, pose estimation allows stores to keep track of customers providing information for the computer to determine which customer interacted with the store, like when a product is grabbed.

=== Human assistance ===
Tracking camera in an Amazon Fresh store

Inadequacies in Amazon's automatic tracking required over a thousand employees in India to label videos to allocate purchases to shoppers. As a result, the company in 2024 announced it would remove its "Just Walk Out" technology from its Amazon Fresh stores.

== Regions ==
=== United States ===
In 2016, Amazon announced the opening of its first cashierless store, Amazon Go, which opened in 2018. To shop, customers were required to have the Amazon app (formerly a specific Amazon Go app) so that they could be billed for their purchases afterward through their accounts. Amazon introduced its cashierless technology in two Whole Foods stores located in Washington, D.C., and Sherman Oaks, California, in 2022.

In January 2021, the Hudson Group, a travel retailer, announced that it would be implementing Amazon's Just Walk Out technology in select airport convenience stores, branded as Hudson Nonstop.

In June 2021, San Diego’s first fully automated and cashierless store, Valet Market, was opened to the public. Valet market is powered by the technology company Accel Robotics which utilizes an advanced machine learning AI platform that optimizes efficiency in local markets. There are three ways of shopping at Valet Store: Hub Store, Satellite Store, and Last Step Delivery.

Cashierless stores have also been established in sporting and event arenas. In March 2021, Delaware North opened two cashierless MRKT convenience stores at TD Garden in Boston (only open during arena events). With the opening of Seattle's Climate Pledge Arena in October 2021, four stores were equipped with Amazon's cashierless technology. In April 2022, Minute Maid Park in Houston became the first Major League Baseball stadium to incorporate cashierless stores, installing Amazon's technology at two of its concession stands. Minor league Polar Park in Worcester, Massachusetts, launched similar technology from startup Standard AI in April 2022.

=== Asia ===
Japan introduced cashierless shopping to their country by implementing New Zealand start-up Imagr's scalable autonomous checkout technology. However, Imagr's technology in Japan is not fully cashierless. Customers have to go to a checkout operator to accommodate Japanese customers' shopping behavior of paying with cash and having a cashier. Cashierless stores can also be found at a subway station in Tokyo. In addition, other convenience store chains are implementing their cashierless stores. Stores like 7-Eleven and Lawson are working towards creating cashierless stores.

In Singapore, the first cashierless convenience store, a Cheers outlet, launched in 2017, where it saves 180 man hours per week through their autonomous format. The Cheers outlet was the first convenience store that allows customers to pay with Nets by QR code.

In China, the competition with the US in the adoption and growth of cashierless stores led to rapid developments. Taobao launched the "Tao Cafe" pop-up cashierless store in Hangzhou in July 2017, and Alibaba opened a cashierless experience store in January 2018. Other Chinese retail giants such as Jingdong and WeChat also opened cashierless flash stores. However, by 2018, many of these stores faced closures and bankruptcies. The online retailer JD.com had announced 5,000 virtual shelves in July 2018 but retracted from this engagement 6 months later. One reason for the rapid downfall was the failure of the pioneering stores to create an authentic "just-walk-out" experience, which diminished the convenience of shopping there. The focus on technology over customer experience contributed to the decline.

=== Europe ===
In 2019, Sainsbury's opened the first cashierless store in the United Kingdom. However, it closed a few months later due to customer dissatisfaction with the lack of additional payment options. In September 2021, Aldi UK announced its first cashierless store in Greenwich. In October 2021, Tesco introduced its cashierless store called the GetGo store in central London, following a small trial of a similar store at the Tesco head office in Welwyn Garden City.

A Finnish company called Korttelikauppa opened a cashierless store in Helsinki in 2020, followed by six more stores in 2021 in Helsinki, Espoo, and Vantaa. Also in 2021, another Finnish convenience retailer, R-kioski, opened a cashierless store called R-kioski Go! in Helsinki.

In Poland, Żabka launched its Żabka Nano format in June 2021, debuting the first autonomous, cashierless store in Poznań. Since then, Żabka Nano stores have been opened in other major Polish cities, including Katowice, Kraków, Tricity, Warsaw and Wrocław.

In the Netherlands, Aldi Nord opened the first cashierless store in Utrecht as a 12-month trial in 2022.

November 2023, in France, Carrefour launched a pilot store in Paris called Flash 10/10 ("10 seconds to shop and 10 seconds to pay") with AiFi’s technology. It contains 900 SKU on 50 m2. Carrefour Flash was previously tested at head office in Massy over more than a year, during which the Innovation team was able to refine the technology and adapt the concept based on feedback from the employees using it on a daily basis.

=== Middle East ===
In September 2021, French conglomerate Carrefour, thanks to its partner Majid Al Futtaim Group, opened the first cashierless store in the Middle East called Carrefour City+, located in the Mall of the Emirates in Dubai.

In 2019, Israel opened their first cashierless store Nowpet, a cashierless pet shop, which uses the technology developed by startup Cyb-Org. Cyb-Org’s sensor technology differentiates from Amazon Go’s implementation of computer vision by detecting the weight of the shelf whenever customers grab products. Cyb-Org has also collaborated with Rami Levy, a popular grocery chain store in Israel, to implement cashierless technology of scanning fingerprints as a method of purchase, which costs much less compared to Amazon Go’s checkout mechanism on its shopping carts.

=== Africa ===
In 2021, South Africa’s first cashierless food store, Checkers, was in the process of testing a store without checkout counters, from the technology of Shoprite Holdings.

== See also ==
- Amazon Go
- Automated convenience store
- Automated retail
- Cashless society
- Technological unemployment
