= History of Amazon =

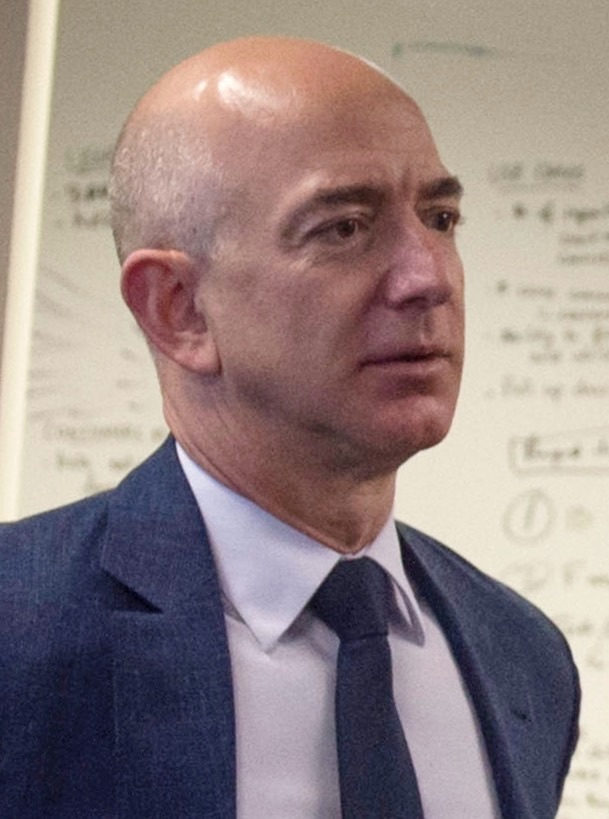
Jeff Bezos, who founded Amazon in his and MacKenzie's Bellevue, Washington garage in 1994

Amazon is an American multinational technology company which focuses on e-commerce, cloud computing, entertainment and digital streaming. It has been referred to as "one of the most influential economic and cultural forces in the world", and is one of the world's most valuable brands.

Amazon was founded by Jeff Bezos from his garage in Bellevue, Washington, on July 5, 1994. Initially an online marketplace for books, it has expanded into a multitude of product categories: a strategy that has earned it the moniker "the everything store". It has multiple subsidiaries including Amazon Web Services (cloud computing), Zoox (autonomous vehicles), Amazon Leo (satellite Internet), Amazon Lab126 (computer hardware and technology R&D). Its other subsidiaries include Ring, Twitch, IMDb, Amazon MGM and Whole Foods Market.

== Founding ==
The company was created as a result of what Jeff Bezos called his "regret minimization framework" – to avoid regretting, in his old age, not having tried to participate in the emerging internet with his own startup. In 1994, Bezos left his job as a vice president at D. E. Shaw & Co., a Wall Street firm, and moved to Seattle, Washington, where he began to work on a business plan for what would become Amazon.com.

On July 5, 1994, Bezos initially incorporated the company in Washington state with the name Cadabra, Inc. After a few months, he changed the name to Amazon.com, Inc, because a lawyer misheard its original name as "cadaver". Bezos selected this name by looking through a dictionary; he settled on "Amazon" because it was a place that was "exotic and different", just as he had envisioned for his Internet enterprise. The Amazon River, he noted, was the biggest river in the world, and he planned to make his store the biggest bookstore in the world. Additionally, a name that began with "A" was preferred because it would probably be at the top of an alphabetized list. Bezos placed a premium on his head start in building a brand and told a reporter, "There's nothing about our model that can't be copied over time. But you know, McDonald's got copied. And it's still built a huge, multibillion-dollar company. A lot of it comes down to the brand name. Brand names are more important online than they are in the physical world."

In its early days, the company was operated out of the garage of Bezos's house on Northeast 28th Street in Bellevue, Washington. Shel Kaphan was the programmer at the company's inception.

== Online bookstore and IPO ==
After reading a report about the future of the Internet that projected annual web commerce growth at 2,300%, Bezos created a list of 20 products that could be marketed online. He narrowed the list to what he felt were the five most promising products, which included: compact discs, computer hardware, computer software, videos, and books. Bezos finally decided that his new business would sell books online, because of the large worldwide demand for literature, the low unit price for books, and the huge number of titles available in print. Amazon was founded in the garage of Bezos' rented home in Bellevue. Bezos' parents invested almost $245,573 (equivalent to $518,900 in 2025) in the start-up.

On July 16, 1995, Amazon opened as an online bookseller, selling the world's largest collection of books to anyone with World Wide Web access. The first book sold on Amazon.com was Douglas Hofstadter's Fluid Concepts and Creative Analogies: Computer Models of the Fundamental Mechanisms of Thought. In the first two months of business, Amazon sold to all 50 states and over 45 countries. Within two months, Amazon's sales were up to $20,000 per week. In October 1995, the company announced itself to the public. In 1996, it was reincorporated in Delaware. Amazon issued its initial public offering of capital stock on May 15, 1997, at $18 per share, on the NASDAQ stock exchange under the symbol AMZN.

Barnes & Noble sued Amazon on May 12, 1997, alleging that Amazon's claim to be "the world's largest bookstore" was false because it "...wasn't a bookstore at all. It's a book broker." The suit was later settled out of court and Amazon continued to make the same claim.

== Product Expansion ==
In June of 1998 the company began to offer music.

Walmart sued Amazon on October 16, 1998, alleging that Amazon had stolen Walmart's trade secrets by hiring former Walmart executives. Although this suit was also settled out of court, it caused Amazon to implement internal restrictions and the reassignment of the former Walmart executives.

In 1999, Amazon first attempted to enter the publishing business by buying a defunct imprint, "Weathervane", and publishing some books "selected with no apparent thought", according to The New Yorker. The imprint quickly vanished again, and as of 2014 Amazon representatives said that they had never heard of it.

== 21st century ==
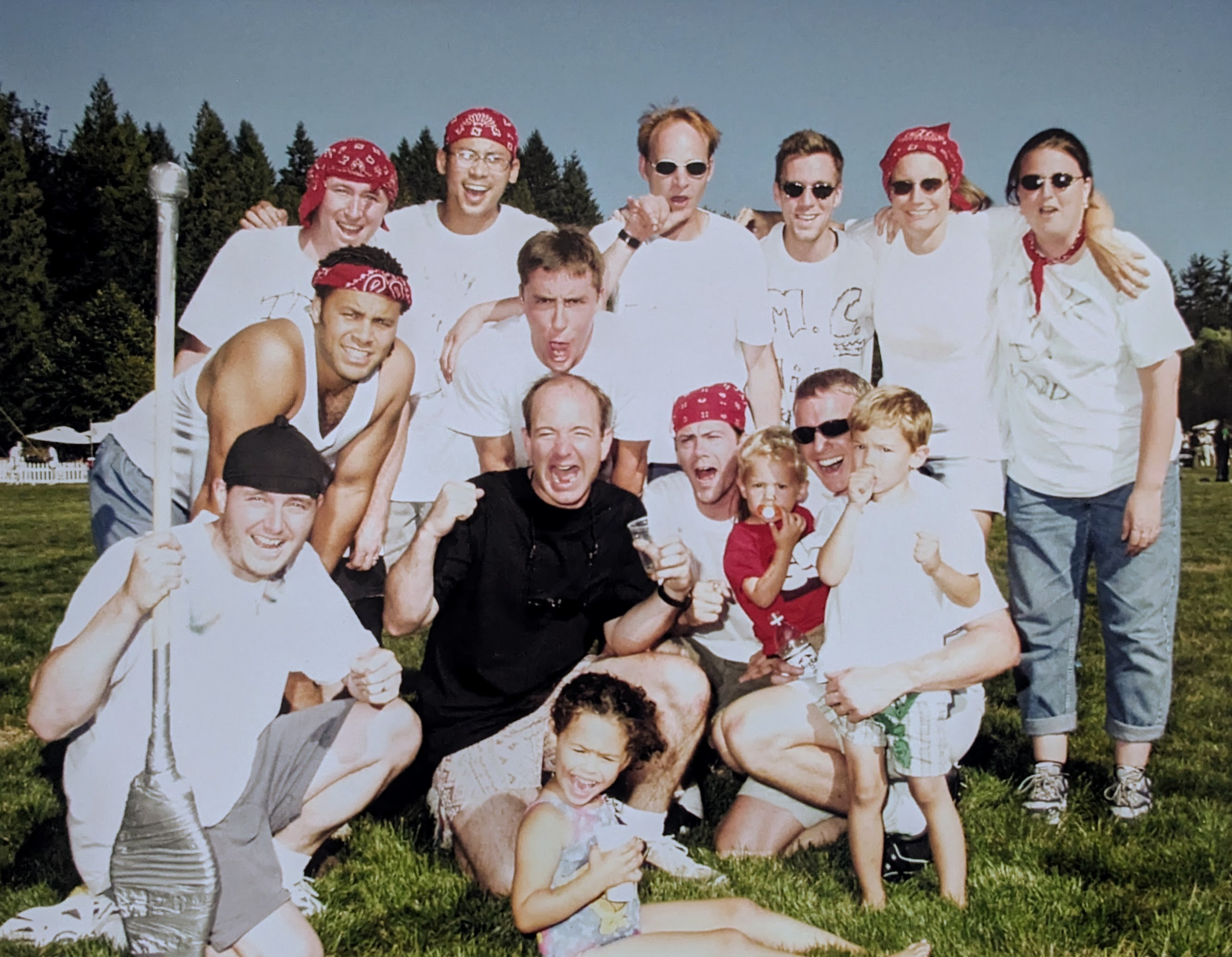
Amazon Toys Team employees during a summer Amazon party with Jeff Bezos wearing a black shirt, c. 2000

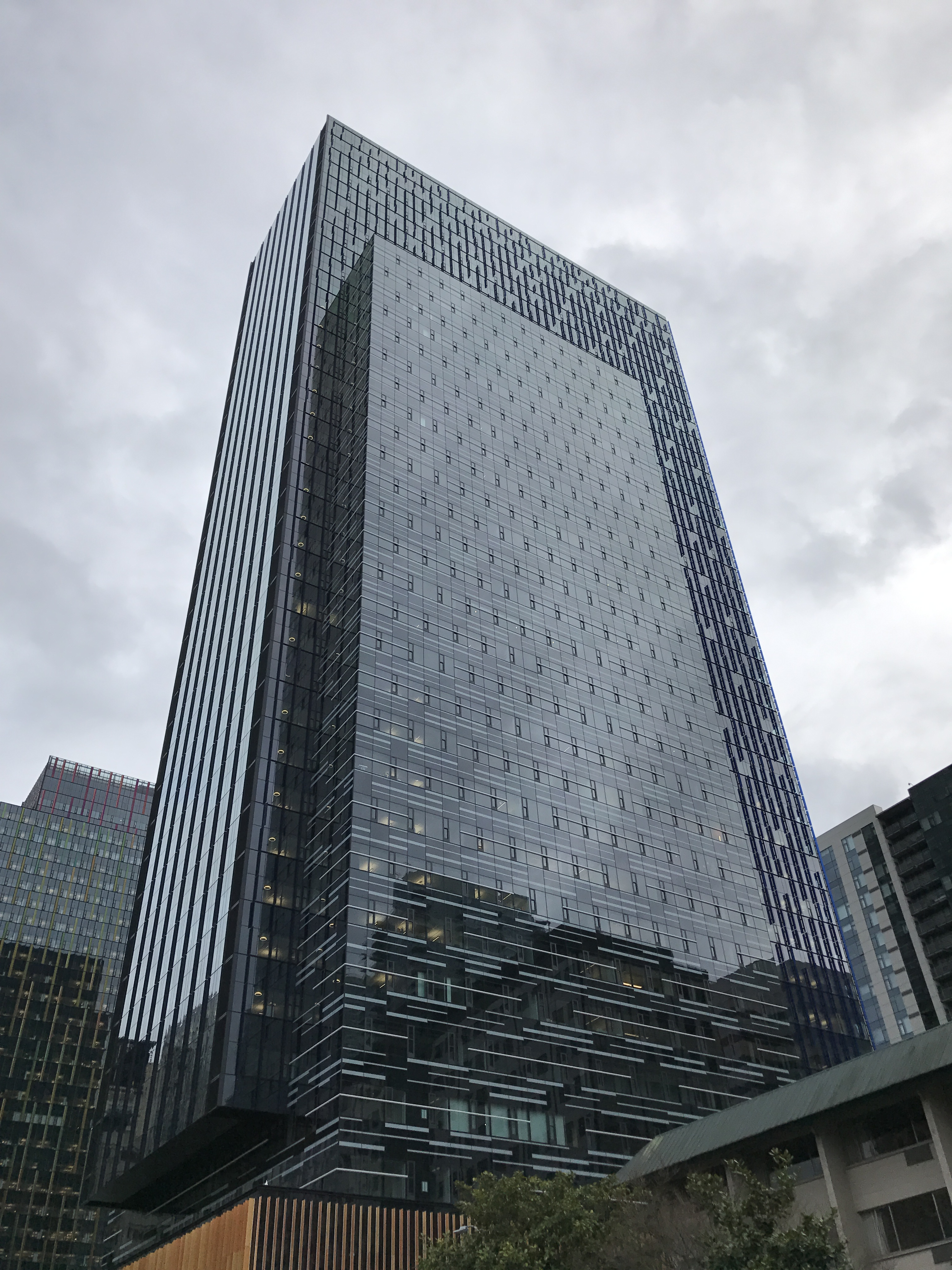
The (new) Day 1 building in Seattle

Between October 1999 and February 2000 Amazon's logotype has featured a curved arrow leading from A to Z, representing that the company carries every product from A to Z, with the arrow shaped like a smile.

According to sources, Amazon did not expect to make a profit for four to five years. This comparatively slow growth caused stockholders to complain that the company was not reaching profitability fast enough to justify their investment or even survive in the long term. In 2001, the dot-com bubble burst, destroying many e-companies in the process, but Amazon survived and moved forward beyond the tech crash to become a huge player in online sales. The company finally turned its first profit in the fourth quarter of 2001: $0.01 (i.e., 1¢ per share), on revenues of more than $1 billion. This profit margin, though extremely modest, proved to skeptics that Bezos' unconventional business model could succeed.

In 2011, Amazon had 30,000 full-time employees in the US, and by the end of 2016, it had 180,000 employees.

In 2014, Amazon launched the Fire Phone. The Fire Phone was meant to deliver media streaming options but the venture failed, resulting in Amazon registering a $170 million loss. This would also lead to the Fire Phone production being stopped the following year. In August of the same year, Amazon would finalize the acquisition of Twitch, a social video gaming streaming site, for $970 million. This new acquisition would be integrated into the game production division of Amazon.

In June 2017, Amazon announced that it would acquire Whole Foods, a high-end supermarket chain with over 400 stores, for $13.4 billion. The acquisition was seen by media experts as a move to strengthen its physical holdings and challenge Walmart's supremacy as a brick and mortar retailer. This sentiment was heightened by the fact that the announcement coincided with Walmart's purchase of men's apparel company Bonobos. On August 23, 2017, Whole Foods shareholders, as well as the Federal Trade Commission, approved the deal.

In September 2016, Amazon announced plans to locate a second headquarters in a metropolitan area with at least a million people. Cities needed to submit their presentations by October 19, 2017, for the project called HQ2. The $5 billion second headquarters, starting with 500,000 square feet and eventually expanding to as much as 8 million square feet, may have as many as 50,000 employees. In 2017, Amazon announced it would build a new downtown Seattle building with space for Mary's Place, a local charity in 2020.

At the end of 2017, Amazon had over 566,000 employees worldwide.

According to an August 8, 2018, story in Bloomberg Businessweek, Amazon has about a 5% share of US retail spending (excluding cars and car parts and visits to restaurants and bars), and a 43.5% share of online spending in the U.S. in 2018. The forecast is for Amazon to own 49% of the total American online spending in 2018, with two-thirds of Amazon's revenue coming from the US.

Amazon launched the last-mile delivery program and ordered 20,000 Mercedes-Benz Sprinter Vans for the service in September 2018.

Amazon generated $386 billion in US retail e-commerce sales in 2020, up 38% over 2019. Amazon's Marketplace sales represent an increasingly dominant portion of its e-commerce business.

On November 14, 2022, it was announced that Amazon had plans to lay off 10,000 employees among its corporate and technology staff. The number increased to 18,000 in a January 2023 announcement. In March, Amazon announced it would eliminate an additional 9,000 jobs.

On September 25, 2023, Amazon and artificial intelligence startup Anthropic announced a strategic partnership in which Amazon would become a minority stakeholder by investing up to US$4 billion, including an immediate investment of $1.25 billion. As part of the deal, Anthropic would use Amazon Web Services (AWS) as its primary cloud provider and will make its AI models available to AWS customers.

With more than one million workers employed in warehouses around the world, Amazon in 2023 started testing humanoid robots that provide partial automation of its work tasks. The robots are able to position empty boxes and indicate where new ones are stored.

=== HQ2 ===
In November 2018, Amazon announced it would open its highly sought-after new headquarters, known as (HQ2) in Long Island City, Queens, New York City, and in the Crystal City neighborhood of Arlington County, Virginia. On February 14, 2019, Amazon announced it was not moving forward with plans to build HQ2 in Queens but would instead focus solely on the Arlington location. The company plans to locate at least 25,000 employees at HQ2 by 2030 and will invest more than US$2.5 billion to establish its new headquarters in Crystal City as well as neighboring Pentagon City and Potomac Yard, an area jointly marketed as "National Landing." The announcement also created a new partnership with Virginia Tech University to develop an Innovation Campus to fill the demand for high-tech talent in National Landing and beyond.

=== COVID-19 ===
At the end of March 2020, some workers of the Staten Island warehouse staged a walkout in protest of the poor health situation at their workplace amidst the 2020 COVID-19 pandemic. One of the organizers, Chris Smalls, was first put on quarantine without anyone else being quarantined, and soon afterwards fired from the company.

The pandemic caused a surge in online shopping and resulted in shortages of household staples both online and in some brick-and-mortar stores. From March 17 to April 10, 2020, Amazon warehouses stopped accepting non-essential items from third-party sellers. The company hired approximately 175,000 additional warehouse workers and delivery contractors to deal with the surge, and temporarily raised wages by $2/hour.

=== Acquisition of MGM ===
After months of speculation due to MGM's poor financial performance from the COVID-19 pandemic's impact on the movie industry, Amazon entered negotiations to acquire MGM at an estimated $9 billion on May 17, 2021. The companies agreed to the merger deal on May 26, 2021, for a total value of $8.45 billion, subject to regulatory approval. The deal would allow Amazon to add the MGM library to the Amazon Prime Video catalog, with the studio continuing to operate as a label under the new parent company.

The merger was finalized on March 17, 2022, following the expiration of the FTC's review deadline and having cleared the European Commission two days earlier on March 15. Later that day, Amazon Studios and Prime Video SVP Mike Hopkins revealed that Amazon will continue to partner with United Artists Releasing (MGM and Annapurna Pictures' joint distribution venture), which will remain in operation to release all future MGM titles theatrically on a "case-by-case basis," while "all MGM employees will join my organization." It was also revealed that Amazon had no plans to make changes to the studio's production slate and release schedules nor make all MGM content exclusive to Prime Video, providing some hope that the studio would operate autonomously from Amazon Studios. These plans are expected to not impact the future of the James Bond franchise and its creative team. Two town halls further detailing MGM's future post-merger took place on March 18, 2022, which included one for MGM employees and one for Amazon Studios/Prime Video employees. Both revealed the new interim reporting structure as part of Amazon's "phased integration plan," which would involve De Luca, Mark Burnett (Chairman of MGM Worldwide Television) and COO Chris Brearton reporting to Hopkins on behalf of the studio. On April 27, 2022, it was announced that De Luca and Abdy would leave the studio.

On October 4, 2023, MGM Holdings was merged into Amazon Studios, with the latter company renaming itself to Amazon MGM Studios as a result.

== Amazon Go ==
On January 22, 2018, Amazon Go, a store that uses cameras and sensors to detect items that a shopper grabs off shelves and automatically charges a shopper's Amazon account, was opened to the general public in Seattle. As customers enter the store, they are required to scan the Amazon Go app on a smart device linked to their Amazon account. The technology is meant to eliminate the need for checkout lines. Amazon Go was initially opened for Amazon employees in December 2016. By the end of 2018, Amazon was operating a total of 8 Amazon Go stores located in Seattle, Chicago, San Francisco and New York. As of August 2024, Amazon Go had 23 locations in New York, California, Washington, and Illinois.

== Amazon 4-Star ==
Amazon announced to debut the Amazon 4-star in the Soho neighborhood of New York City on Spring Street between Crosby and Lafayette on September 27, 2018. The store carries 4-star and above-rated products from around New York. The Amazon website searches for the most rated, highly demanded, frequently bought, and most wished for products which are then sold in the new Amazon store under separate categories. Along with the paper price tags, the online review cards will also be available for the customers to read before buying the product. In late 2021, Amazon opened two 4-star stores in the United Kingdom. Its store at the Bluewater Shopping Centre in Kent opened in October, and its store at Westfield London opened in November.

In March 2022, Amazon announced that they would be closing all 4-star stores, along with their Books and Pop Up stores, across the US and the UK, stating that they were refocusing on their grocery and fashion stores.

== Mergers and acquisitions ==
Amazon has grown through several mergers and acquisitions. The company has also invested in a number of growing firms, both in the United States and internationally. In 2014, Amazon purchased top level domain .buy in auction for over $4 million. The company has invested in brands that offer a wide range of services and products, including Engine Yard, a Ruby-on-Rails platform as a service company, and Living Social, a local deal site.

== Timeline ==
=== Overview ===
Time period	Key developments at Amazon
1994–1998	Amazon started off as an online bookstore selling books, primarily competing with local booksellers and Barnes & Noble. It IPOs in 1997.
1998–2004	Amazon starts to expand its services beyond books. It also starts offering convenience services, such as Free Super Savers Shipping.
2005–2011	Amazon moves into the cloud computing area with Amazon AWS, as well as the crowdsourcing area with Amazon Mechanical Turk. By being an early player, it eventually dominates the cloud computing scene, allowing it to control much of the physical infrastructure of the Internet. Amazon also offers the Amazon Kindle for people to purchase their books as eBooks, and by 2010, more people buy ebooks than physical books from Amazon.
2011–2015	Amazon starts offering streaming services like Amazon Music and Amazon Video. By 2015, its market capitalization surpassed that of Walmart.

=== Full timeline ===
Year	Month and date	Event type	Details
1994	July 4	Company	Amazon founded.
1995	July 16	Launch	Amazon launches its online bookstore.
1997	May 15	Company	Amazon IPOs at $18.00/share, raising $54 million.
1998	April 27	Acquisitions	Amazon acquires the Internet Movie Database, a comprehensive repository for movie information on the Internet.
1998	August 24	Company Direction	Amazon announces that it will move beyond books.
1998	December	Competition	Jack Ma launches Alibaba in China, which would later grow to dominate the Chinese online retail market, and provide an obstacle to Amazon's attempts to expand in China.
2002	January	Product	Amazon launches Free Super Saver Shipping, which allows customers to get free shipping for orders above $99.
2002	March	Legal, Competition	Amazon settles its October 1999 patent infringement suit against Barnes & Noble (over its 1-Click checkout system, which it received a patent for in September 1999). It originally charged that Barnes&Noble.com had essentially copied Amazon's 1-Click technology.
2003	October	Product	Amazon launches A9.com, a subsidiary of Amazon.com based in Palo Alto, California that develops search and advertising technology.
2003	December	Company	First profit announced.
2004	August 19	International	Amazon acquires Joyo, an online bookstore in China, for $75 million, which then becomes the 7th regional website of Amazon.com. joyo later becomes Amazon China.
2005	February	Product	Amazon launches Amazon Prime, a membership offering free two-day shipping within the contiguous United States on all eligible purchases for a flat annual fee of $79.
2005	November	Product	Amazon launches Amazon Mechanical Turk, an application programming interface (API) allowing any Internet user to perform "human intelligence" tasks such as transcribing podcasts, often at very low wages.
2006	August 25	Product	Amazon launches Amazon Elastic Compute Cloud (Amazon EC2), a virtual site farm allowing users to use the Amazon infrastructure to run applications ranging from running simulations to web hosting.
2006	September 19	Product	Amazon launches Fulfillment by Amazon (FBA), giving small businesses the ability to use Amazon.com's own order fulfillment and customer service infrastructure – and customers of Amazon.com shipping offers when buying from 3rd-party sellers.
2006		Legal	Amazon agrees to settle a legal dispute with Toys R Us (over a partnership that gave Toys R Us exclusive rights to supply some toy products on Amazon's website) and pays $51 million.
2006	March	Product	Amazon launches Amazon Simple Storage Service (Amazon S3), which allows other websites/developers to store computer files on Amazon's servers.
2007	August	Product	CreateSpace announces launch of Books on Demand service, which makes it easy for authors who want to self-publish their books to distribute them on Amazon.com.
2007	August	Product	Amazon launches AmazonFresh, a grocery service offering perishable and nonperishable foods.
2007	September 25	Product	Amazon launches Amazon Music, an online music store and music locker.
2007	November 19	Product	Amazon launches the Amazon Kindle.
2009	July 22	Acquisitions, Competition	Amazon acquires Zappos for $850 million.
2009	October 20	Competition	Barnes & Noble announces the Nook, an eReader.
2010	January	Competition	Apple introduces its own virtual bookstore, called iBooks, and then partners with five major book publishers. It later convinces them to raise the price of ebooks (using the agency pricing model that gives publishers full control over ebook prices).
2010	February 1	Competition	Microsoft launches Microsoft Azure, a cloud computing platform that will compete with Amazon AWS over cloud services.
2010	July	Product	Amazon announced that e-book sales for its Kindle reader outnumbered sales of hardcover books for the first time ever.
2011	January	Acquisitions, International	Amazon acquires Lovefilm, a DVD rental service known as the Netflix of Europe.
2011	February 16	Competition	Borders, outcompeted by Amazon, applies for Chapter 11 bankruptcy.
2011	February 22	Product	Amazon rebrands its Amazon Video service as Amazon Instant Video and adds access to 5,000 movies and TV shows for Amazon Prime members.
2011	March 22	Product	Amazon launches the Amazon Appstore for Android devices and the service was made available in over 200 countries.
2011	July 1	Legal	California starts collecting sales taxes on Amazon.com purchases.
2011	September	Product	Amazon launches Amazon Locker, a delivery locker system that allows users to get items delivered at specially designed lockers.
2011	September 28	Product	Amazon announces the Kindle Fire, a tablet computer that takes aim at Apple's iPad with a smaller device that sells at $199, compared with the $499 value of Apple's cheapest iPad.
2012	April	Legal	The Department of Justice files suit against Apple Inc and five major publishing houses (the "Big Five"), alleging that they colluded in 2010 to raise the price of ebooks (using the agency pricing model that gives publishers full control over ebook prices). Amazon had originally set the price of ebooks at $9.99 (using the wholesale pricing model giving Amazon full control over ebook prices).
2012	March 19	Acquisitions	Amazon acquires Kiva Systems for $775 million, a robotics company that creates robots that can move items around warehouses.
2012	April	Legal	Amazon agrees to allow collection of sales taxes in both Nevada and Texas (starting on July 1), and agrees to create 2,500 jobs and invest $200 million in new distribution centers in Texas.
2012	September 6	Product	Amazon announces the Kindle Fire HD series of touchscreen tablet computers.
2013	March	Acquisitions	Amazon acquires social reading and book-review site GoodReads.
2013	June	International	Amazon launches in India.
2014	July 25	Product	Amazon launches the Amazon Fire.
2014	August 25	Acquisitions	Amazon announced its intent to acquire the video game streaming website Twitch for $970 million.
2014	October	Legal	Amazon reaches agreement with Simon & Schuster, allowing the publisher to adopt the agency pricing model and set prices on its books sold on Amazon.
2014	November 6 (announcement), actual rollout occurs through 2015	Product	Amazon unveils Amazon Echo, a wireless speaker and voice command device that can take commands and queries, and be used to add items to the Amazon.com shopping cart, among other things. The Alexa Voice Service that is built into Amazon Echo can also be added to other Amazon devices.
2014	November	Legal	Amazon resolves dispute with Hachette, allowing Hachette to adopt the agency-pricing model and set prices on Hachette books sold on Amazon.
2015	July	Competition, International	Alibaba announces that it will invest $1 billion into its Aliyun cloud computing arm, some of which would go into new Aliyun international data centers. This would allow Aliyun to compete with Amazon Web Services outside of China.
2015	August 26	Product	Amazon launches Amazon Underground, an Android app through which users can get gaming and other apps for free that they would otherwise have to pay for, and also get in-app purchases for free. App creator participation is voluntary. App creators are paid $0.002 for every minute a user spends in the app.
2015	September 8	Product	Amazon launches its Amazon Restaurants service that delivers food from nearby restaurants, for Amazon Prime customers in Seattle. The service would subsequently be rolled out to many other cities.
2015	November 2	Product	Amazon opened its first physical retail store, a bookstore in the University Village shopping center in Seattle. The store, known as Amazon Books, has prices matched to those found on the Amazon website and integrate online reviews into the store's shelves.
2015	December 14	Company	Amazon begins moving into their new headquarters campus in the Denny Triangle neighborhood of Seattle, beginning with the 38-story Amazon Tower I (nicknamed "Doppler" after the codename for Amazon Echo). The three towers are scheduled to be completed by 2020.
2016	December 7	Delivery	Amazon Prime Air (Amazon's drone-based delivery system) makes its first delivery in Cambridge in the United Kingdom. The successful delivery is announced a week later, on December 14, along with video.
2017	June 15	Acquisitions	Amazon acquires Whole Foods for $13.7 billion, a grocery-store chain located throughout the United States, United Kingdom, and Canada.
2017	September 7	Company	Amazon began search for Amazon HQ2, a second company headquarters to house up to 50,000 employees.
2018	January 18	Company	Amazon narrows down the choices of its second headquarters location to 20 places.
2018	January 22	Company	Amazon opens a cashier-less grocery store (Amazon Go) to the public.
2018	September 19	International	Amazon launches in Turkey.
2018	October 2	Company	After widespread criticism, Amazon raises its minimum wage for all U.S. and U.K. employees to $15 an hour, including Whole Foods and seasonal employees, beginning November 1, 2018.
2018	November 13	Company	Jeff Bezos announces that the new headquarters HQ2 will be split between New York City and Northern Virginia.
2019	February 14	Company	Amazon cancels plans to open new HQ2 in New York City after massive backlash from local politicians and community members. Plans in Northern Virginia remain unchanged.
2019		International	Having already invested over $6 billion in India, a key growth market, Amazon acquired a 49% stake in Future Coupons, a subsidiary of Future Retail, India's second largest retail chain after Reliance Industries. The deal would give Amazon a 3.58% stake in Future Retail through warrants owned by Future Coupons.
