= Re:Invent =

Amazon building in Seattle, Washington

re:Invent
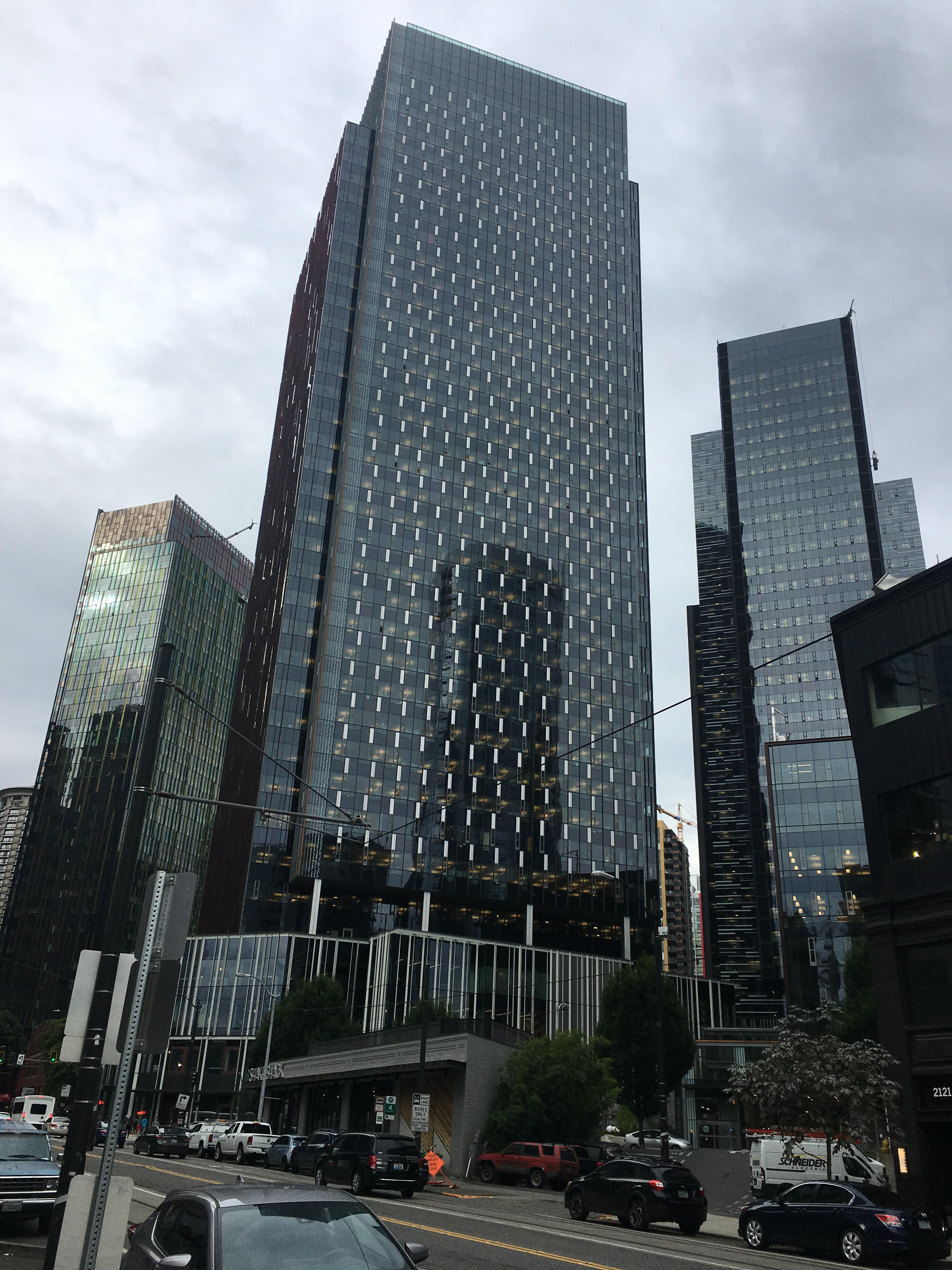
- re:Invent tower with Doppler on the left and Day 1 on its right

- Location within Downtown Seattle

General information
- Status: Completed
- Type: Office building
- Location: 2121 8th Avenue; Seattle, Washington, U.S.
- Coordinates: 47°36′59″N 122°20′20″W
- Construction started: November 2016
- Opened: June 2019
- Owner: Amazon

Height
- Roof: 520 feet (160 m)

Technical details
- Floor count: 37
- Floor area: 1.1 million square feet (100,000 m^{2})

Design and construction
- Architecture firm: NBBJ
- Main contractor: Sellen Construction

Other information
- Parking: 1,128 stalls

re:Invent is a 37-story high-rise office building on the Amazon headquarters campus in Seattle, Washington, United States. It opened in 2019 and houses 5,000 employees as one of three major high-rise towers on Amazon's campus in the Denny Triangle neighborhood north of Downtown Seattle.

== History ==
The site, located between the Amazon Spheres and Westlake Avenue, was formerly home to a Toyota car dealership that moved to SoDo in 2015. Unlike its neighboring towers, Doppler and Day One, construction of the third tower was delayed while the existing dealership building was re-used as a hub for Prime Now deliveries. The Prime Now hub was relocated to SoDo in October 2016 and construction on the third tower began the following month.

The building opened in June 2019 and was named "re:Invent" for an annual cloud computing conference hosted by Amazon. It houses 5,000 employees, primarily working for the company's cloud computing platform, Amazon Web Services, and also has ground-level retail spaces. It includes a plaza with fountains and a bronze sculpture by Gerard Tsutakawa.

One of the retail spaces in the building is an Amazon 4-star store that sells items rated four stars or higher. It opened in August 2019. A food hall operated by San Francisco-based China Live was announced to occupy 13,000 square feet (1,200 m^{2}) of the building's retail space in February 2020, but was later delayed and ultimately cancelled due to the COVID-19 pandemic.

In November 2023, the Gage Academy of Art announced that it would move into the vacant ground-level retail space at re:Invent in mid-2024. The 14,000-square-foot (1,300 m^{2}) facility will serve 3,000 students. Other retail spaces in the complex are filled by Glassybaby and record label Sub Pop's store.
