= Gage Academy of Art =

Art school in Seattle, Washington

Coordinates: 47°37′58″N 122°19′14″W

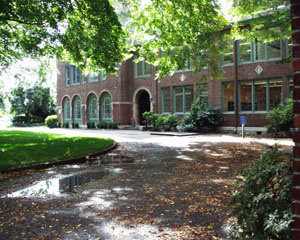
St. Nicholas Building, former home to Gage Academy

Gage Academy of Art is a fine art school located in Seattle, Washington, specializing in drawing, painting and sculpting. The core of its programming is traditional observational training, with an emphasis on the foundational skills of figure drawing and painting. Other classes include perspective, watercolor, still-life drawing and painting, cast drawing, egg tempera, design concepts, color theory and encaustic techniques.

== History ==
Gage was conceived in 1989 by New York artist Gary Faigin and architect Pamela Belyea. The following summer, they began a month-long series of workshops held in Santa Fe. By 1992, after the founders moved to Seattle, it had expanded to scheduled workshops in New York, Seattle and Santa Fe.

In 1991, the school began operating year-round in Seattle under the name the Academy of Realist Art, offering a variety of classes and workshops for artists of all levels of ability. Two years later, Gage added summer art workshops for teens. This addition paved the way for year-round programs for children and teens offered presently both on-site and in the Seattle community

Over the next decade, Gage grew rapidly. In 2004, the school transitioned into the historic St. Nicholas Building in Seattle’s Capitol Hill area, quadrupling its square footage. This enabled the school to offer a broader range of educational and community events, specifically those tailored to serving emerging artists in the Seattle area.

Though the school became a nonprofit organization in 2000, adopting the name the Seattle Academy of Fine Art, it changed its name again in 2006 to Gage Academy of Art, thereby incorporating an old French-English word meaning "a challenge" or "a pledge."

Gage Academy of Art has earned awards for its contribution to the arts both in the local community and on a state-wide level. Most notably are the Mayor's Small Business Award given in 1998 and the Governor's Arts Award in 2007 for arts education across Washington State.

In November 2023, Gage announced that it would move from its existing Capitol Hill campus to re:Invent, an office building in the Amazon headquarters complex in Denny Triangle. The move is scheduled for mid-2024 and includes ten years of rent assistant from Amazon.

== Community Events ==
Gage holds two major community events: Drawing Jam and Best of Gage. The former takes place in December, and features a cast of more than 50 models rotating throughout the building’s studios accompanied by musicians.

In June, Gage invites its adult artists to showcase their work for a month-long exhibition called Best of Gage, a Student Art Exhibition.

Every year Gage also hosts an art auction to support the nonprofit institution.

In addition to the large-scale community events, Gage holds numerous lunch-time professional development seminars. ArtTalk focuses on artists’ intentions, process and methods. Artist’s Toolkit centers on the "real world" of art.

== Exhibitions ==
Gage offers free rotating exhibitions in three galleries within the school. Art from students, instructors and locally and nationally recognized guest artists have been displayed in the Steele Gallery, Rosen Gallery and Entry Gallery. Past artists have included Anna McKee, Amy Johnson, Gala Bent, Chauney Peck, Paul Kuniholm, Whiting Tennis, Michael Lane, Lisa Buchanan, Tip Toland, Jeremy Mangan and Timothy Cross.

To contribute to Seattle’s art discourse, Gage hosts lectures that coincide with the exhibitions. Working professional artists and art historians lead these discussions, covering a broad spectrum of topics. The lectures are free and open to the public.
