= Amazon Spheres =

Amazon workspace complex in Seattle, Washington

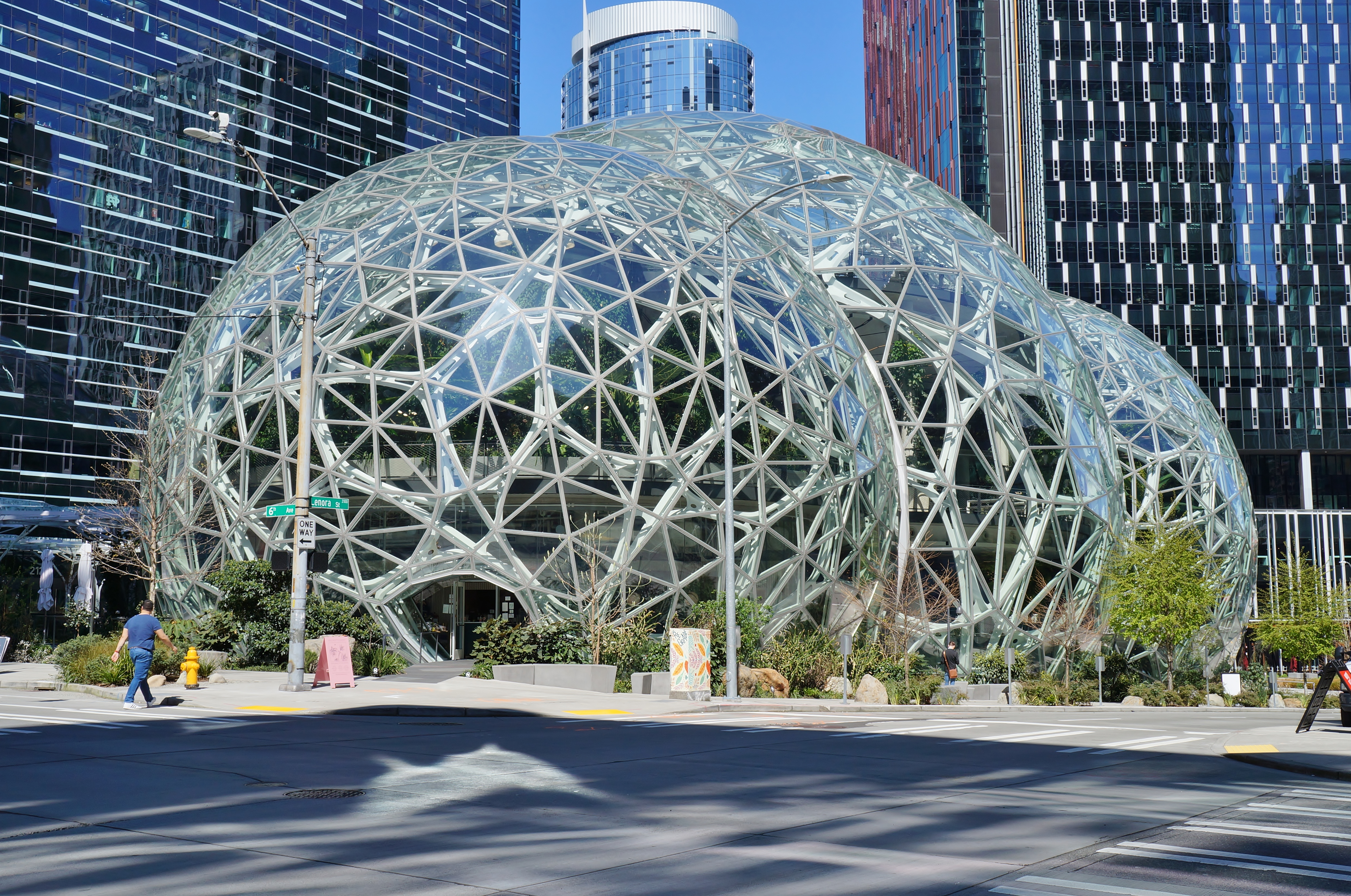
- Amazon Spheres in April 2020

- Location within Downtown Seattle

General information
- Type: Conservatory
- Location: 2111 7th Avenue; Seattle, Washington, U.S.
- Coordinates: 47°36′57″N 122°20′22″W
- Opened: January 30, 2018

Technical details
- Structural system: Concrete core, steel frame and glass façade

Design and construction
- Architect: NBBJ
- Structural engineer: Magnusson Klemencic Associates

The Amazon Spheres are three spherical conservatories comprising part of the Amazon headquarters campus in Seattle, Washington, United States. Designed by NBBJ and landscape firm Site Workshop, its three glass domes are covered in pentagonal hexecontahedron panels and serve as an employee lounge and workspace. The spheres, which range from three to four stories tall, house 40,000 plants, as well as meeting space and retail stores. They are located adjoining the Day 1 building on Lenora Street. The complex opened to Amazon employees and limited public access on January 30, 2018. The spheres are reserved mainly for Amazon employees, but are open to the public through weekly headquarters tours and an exhibit on the ground floor.

== Design ==
The spheres are located along Lenora Street between 6th and 7th Avenues, under Day 1 in Amazon's Seattle headquarters campus. The three intersecting spherical domes range from 80 to 95 feet (24 to 29 m) in height and take up half of a city block. They use over 2,600 panes of glass and 620 short tons (560 t) of steel, arranged with five-sided panels of a pentagonal hexecontahedron.

The largest sphere, in the center, is four stories tall and has 3,225 square feet (299.6 m^{2}) of space; it houses the cafeteria, stairway, elevators, and bathrooms. The stairwell shaft is covered by a four-story "living wall" with 25,000 plants, including carnivorous species from Asia. The spheres have meeting spaces, tables, and benches that can seat a total of 800 people.

The complex, nicknamed "Bezos' balls" by the media, has become a recognizable landmark and tourist attraction for the Denny Triangle area since the beginning of its construction. The structure has been compared to the city's iconic Space Needle, built as a futuristic landmark for the Century 21 Exposition in 1962. It was designed with influences from biophilic design, incorporating nature into the built environment.

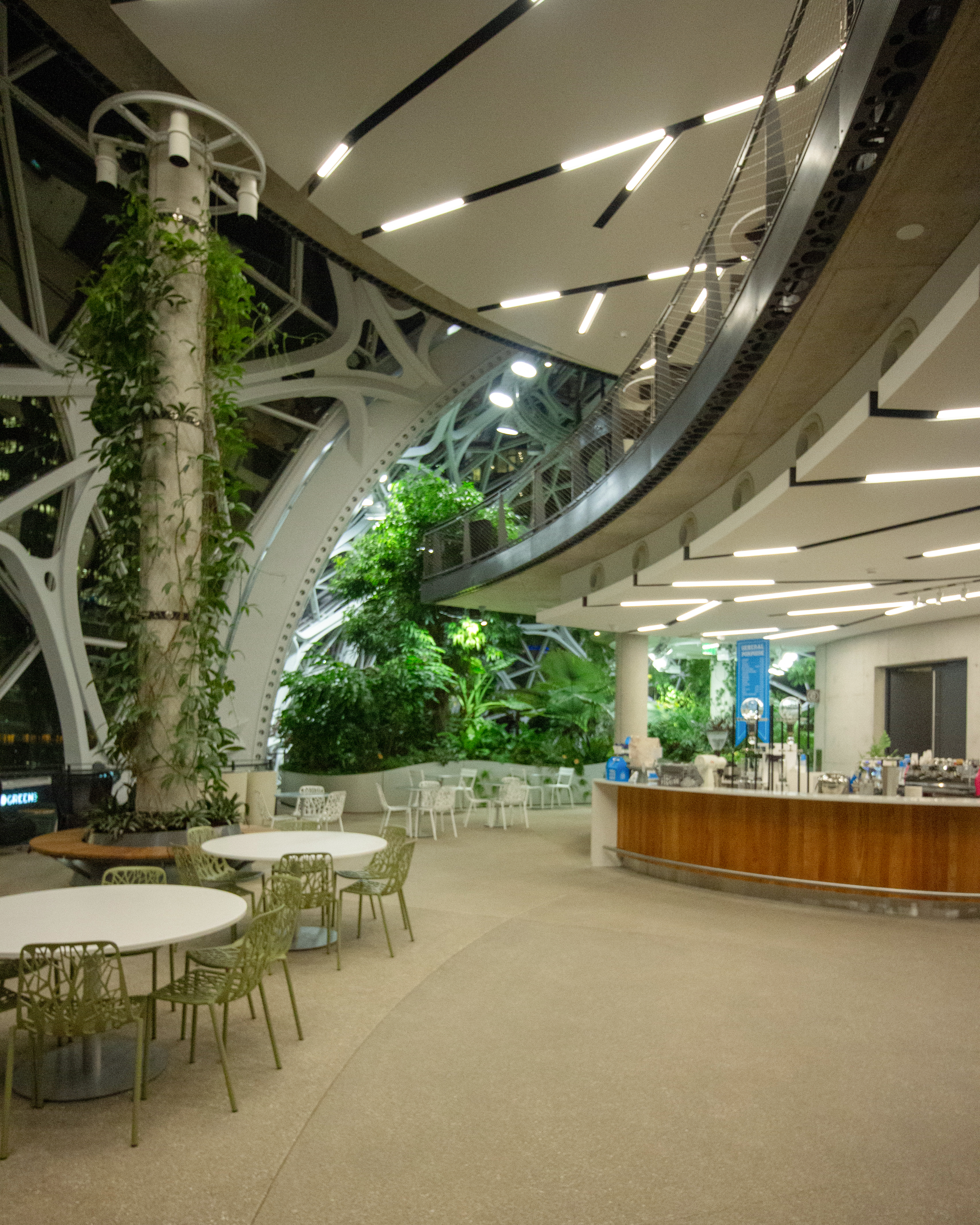
Common area and coffee shop in the central sphere

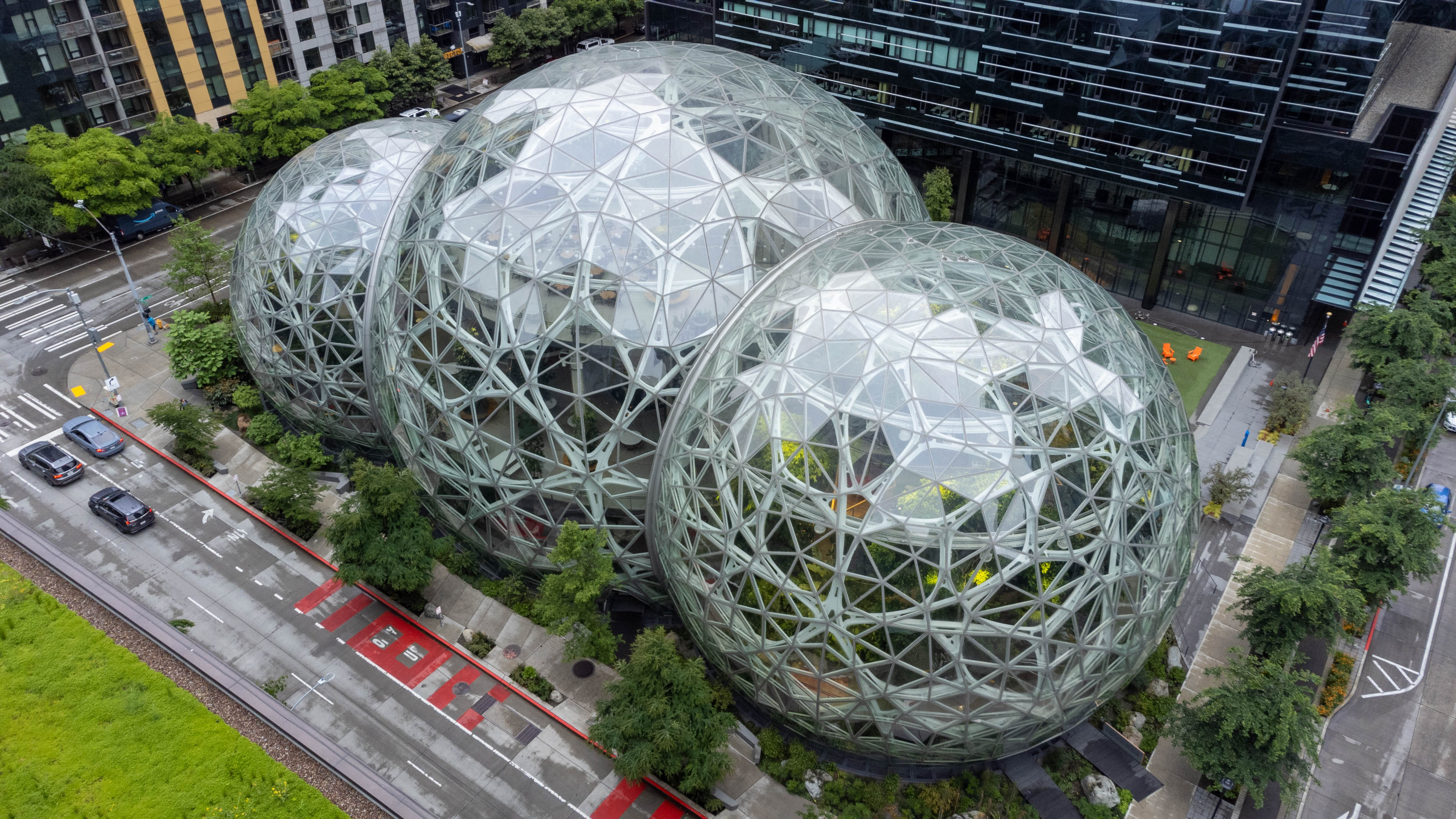
Aerial view of the Amazon Spheres

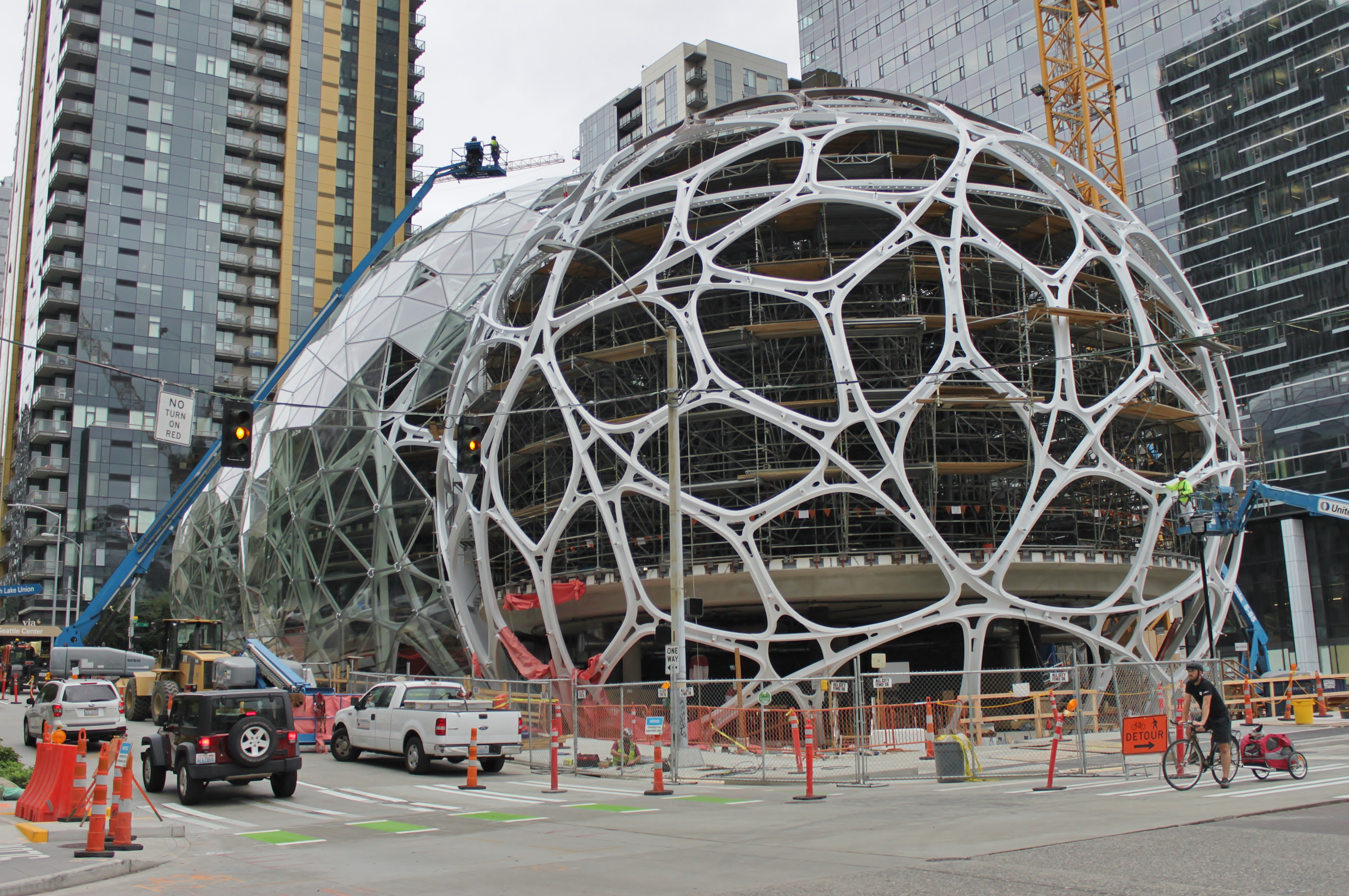
The eastern sphere's steel structure seen in August 2016, during glass installation

== Flora ==
The spheres house 40,000 plants from 50 countries and are divided into three areas, with the western and eastern domes segregated into the Old World and New World. The domes are kept at a temperature of 72 °F (22 °C) and 60 percent humidity during the daytime. Amazon employed a full-time horticulturalist to grow the building's 40,000 plants over a three-year period at a greenhouse in Redmond. Amazon donated space in the greenhouse to the University of Washington's botany program during renovation of their Life Sciences Building in 2016. Among the 40 to 50 trees in the spheres, the largest is a 55-foot (17 m) Ficus rubiginosa tree, nicknamed "Rubi", which was lifted into the spheres by a crane in June 2017.

An Amorphophallus titanum corpse flower named "Morticia" bloomed for 48 hours in October 2018, attracting 5,000 visitors to the Spheres as Amazon opened the facility to public viewing for a limited time. A taller corpse flower, named Bellatrix, bloomed in June 2019 and prompted another public viewing that attracted large crowds.

== History ==
Amazon began planning a large Seattle headquarters campus in the early 2010s, acquiring three blocks in the Denny Triangle area in 2012. The original design for the second tower included a six-story building with flexible workspaces and a meeting center, but was later changed to a spherical conservatory. The revised design by NBBJ, which had been in development since 2012, was unveiled in May 2013 to a mixed reaction from the city's project design review board. While hailed as a bold design, it was criticized for the lack of rain protection, public access, and the amount of energy needed to climatize the facility. In August, NBBJ released an updated design that replaced the supporting steel structures under the glass with organic forms called "Catalan spheres". The city's design review board approved the design in October 2013, after slight changes to the understructure were made.

Construction on the spheres began in 2015, and the first pieces of the steel structure were erected in February 2016. The steel was painted white and covered with glass panels that were installed beginning in April. The first plant, an Australian tree fern, was moved from the Redmond greenhouse and planted in May 2017.

The spheres were dedicated on January 29, 2018, by Jeff Bezos, Mayor Jenny Durkan, County Executive Dow Constantine, and Governor Jay Inslee. Bezos ceremonially opened the complex using an Alexa voice command. It opened to Amazon employees the following day, along with a public exhibit named the "Understory" below the spheres. Public access is provided as part of weekly guided tours of the Amazon headquarters campus and a twice-monthly weekend reservation program. They were temporarily closed to the public during the COVID-19 pandemic.
