= Gary Faigin =

American artist (1950–2025)

- Born: September 17, 1950; Detroit, Michigan, U.S.
- Died: September 6, 2025 (aged 74); Seattle, Washington, U.S.
- Education: Art Students League of New York, National Academy of Design, School of Visual Arts, Parsons School of Design, École nationale supérieure des Beaux-Arts
- Known for: Realist painting
- Notable work: The Artist's Complete Guide to Facial Expression (1990)
- Website: http://www.FaiginART.com/

Gary Faigin (September 17, 1950 – September 6, 2025) was an American artist, author, co-founder and Artistic Director of the Gage Academy of Art, Seattle.

== Background ==
Faigin was born in Detroit, Michigan on September 17, 1950. His parents were both teachers. As a college student during the Vietnam War, Faigin dropped out of the residential college at the University of Michigan to travel to San Francisco to participate in the communal movement at its high point, in the early 1970s.

In 1976, determined to train as a realist artist, Faigin hitchhiked from the West Coast to New York City specifically to study with famed anatomist Robert Beverly Hale at the Art Students League of New York. He remained a student at the League for four years, focusing on figure drawing, anatomy, and perspective. In addition, he pursued art studies part-time at the National Academy of Design, School of Visual Arts, and Parsons School of Design.

In 1979, Faigin travelled to Paris where he spent a year studying at the famed École nationale supérieure des Beaux-Arts.

He resided in Seattle with his wife Pamela Belyea (m. 1976) until his death from prostate cancer on September 6, 2025, at the age of 74. He had two children (b. 1991 and 1996).

== Work ==
Upon the retirement of Robert Beverly Hale, in 1983, Faigin was asked to teach his Figure Drawing class at the League, a program he presented continuously over the next decade. Concurrently, he taught Perspective and Portrait Drawing at the newly founded New York Academy of Art, the National Academy School of Design, the School of Visual Art, and Parsons School of Design. He opened his own studio in Hell's Kitchen and began personal work focused on self-portraits and still lifes.

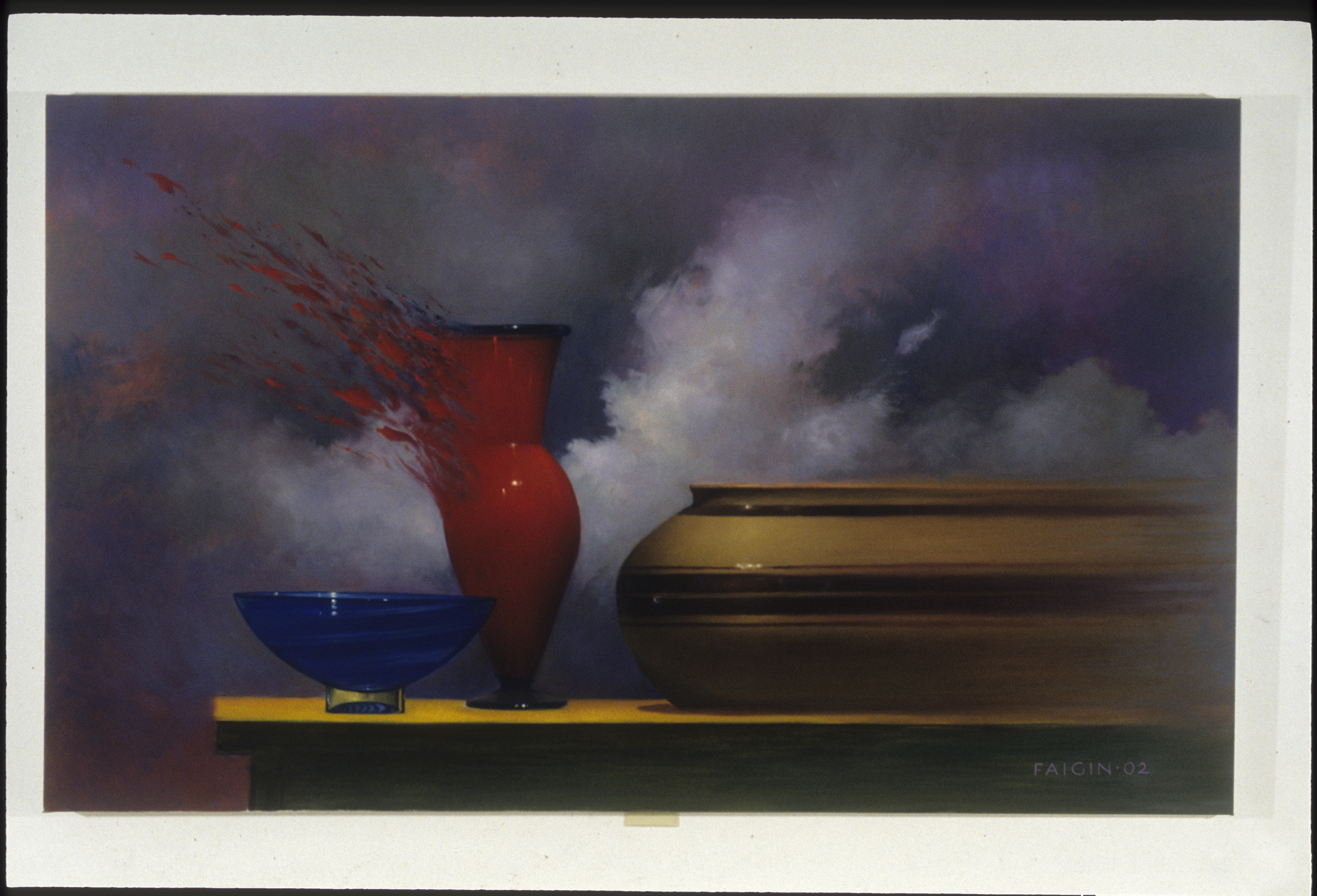
Cause and Effect, Gary Faigin, Oil on Canvas, 2002, 36"x60", Private Collection

In the summer of 1984, Faigin began a ten-year summer residence in Santa Fe, New Mexico, a locale that afforded him exposure to the burgeoning realist painting scene of the Southwest. His works included pastel landscapes and print making with shows at the Frank Croft and the Realist Art Galleries.

In 1989, Faigin and his wife decided to open a summer art school in Santa Fe; the next summer saw the launch of the Academy of Realist Art at St. John’s College with two sessions and 44 students. That school grew into the current year-round Gage Academy of Art in Seattle. Faigin currently serves as Artistic Director of Gage, leads annual Gage art tours to European and American museums, and teaches painting and drawing. A 2005 photo by Thomas Struth captured Faigin lecturing in front of Las Meninas at the Prado to a group of Gage tour participants.

In 1990, Faigin's The Artist's Complete Guide to Facial Expression was published. It is now in its 17th printing and has also been published in French, Italian, German, Japanese, Russian, and Korean. While the book is employed by artists, it is also popular with digital animators, cartoonists, portrait artists, forensic artists, puppeteers, actors, and art directors, as well as psychologists and plastic surgeons; in the extra features of Shrek, The Artist's Guide is seen in several shots during interviews. In 2010, Faigin and Barbara Mones, the Creative Director of the Computer Animation Lab at the University of Washington, organized an interdisciplinary research team to explore the way human expressions are interpreted on stylized (i.e., animated) faces.

The Frye Art Museum in Seattle presented a retrospective exhibition of Faigin's work in 2001. The show included work from the "Moving Pictures" still life series as well as the "City of Billboard" series. Another ongoing series of paintings has featured houses in peril, a sort of foreshadowing of the mortgage crisis of 2008. In 2006, Faigin's Seattle studio was featured in the first public demonstration of Microsoft's Photosynth using the details in his paintings and drawings to show off its high-resolution capabilities. He was nominated for a Neddy Award in 2009. In 2012, Faigin completed a 16-foot mural for Temple Beth Am in Seattle on the subject of the festivals of the Jewish year.

From 2001-2012, Faigin had a monthly spot as an art critic on the KUOW-FM radio station in Seattle and also posted monthly reviews on the Seattle arts website artdish.com. He also wrote art reviews for The Seattle Times for several years, and more recently artist obituaries. Through the Gage Academy, he has hosted an artist interview series called ArtTalk, some of which appear on the Seattle Channel. Many of these interviews are hosted at Town Hall.

In 2015 Faigin joined the Founding Board of the new Cascadia Art Museum in Edmonds, where he was on the Executive Committee. He was also made an Artist Fellow of the Rainier Club.

Faigin is represented by Harris/Harvey Galleryin Pike Place Market in Seattle.
