= China Live =

Chinese marketplace in San Francisco

- Type: Food Retail
- Industry: Restaurants, Grocery store
- Founded: 2017
- Founder: George Chen
- Headquarters: San Francisco, California, United States
- Products: food, wine
- Website: http://www.chinalivesf.com/

China Live is a Chinese marketplace (food hall) in San Francisco, California, which is very large and comprises various casual and fine dining restaurants, bars and food and beverage outlets. China Live was founded by George and Cindy Chen. George Chen was formerly involved in several local restaurants including Betelnut, Xanadu, and Shanghai 1930.

China Live was inspired by, and has been compared to, Eataly, a chain of similar establishments based on Italian food.

A branch in Seattle's Denny Triangle neighborhood on the Amazon headquarters campus was announced in February 2020. China Live later delayed the food hall's opening to 2022 and ultimately cancelled its lease due to the COVID-19 pandemic.
