= Amazon Underground =

App store that offered free variants of paid apps

Amazon Underground was an Android app offered by Amazon through which people could freely download and obtain in-app items that they otherwise had to pay money to purchase. Amazon used the catchphrase "Actually Free" to describe the policy, and affirmed that Amazon Underground was not a one-time or temporary offer but was here to stay. Participation by app developers in the program was voluntary. Amazon compensated app developers based on the time that users spent within the app, at a flat rate of $0.002 per user minute.

Amazon announced on April 28, 2017 that the program would cease accepting new apps on May 31, 2017 and would shut down completely in 2019.

== Model ==
Diagram of the model

=== For consumers ===
Consumers interested in using Amazon Underground could download the app from the Amazon website. The app could not be downloaded from Google Play, Google's Android app store, since it violated the conditions necessary to be listed in the app store.

Once the consumer had downloaded Amazon Underground, they could download all apps participating in Amazon Underground from within the Amazon Underground app. In addition to being able to download the app for free, the consumer could also make in-app purchases for free.

=== For app creators ===
An app creator could choose to participate in the Amazon Underground program. The app creator received payment based on the time spent by users in the app after downloading it, at a flat rate of $0.002 per user minute in the app.

Amazon listed the following eligibility requirements for participating apps:

- The app must have been available for download from the Google Play or Apple App Store, and have been monetized in at least one of the following ways:
  - The app was available to purchase for a fee in all other app stores where it was sold
  - The app contained in-app items that were available for purchase for a fee.
- The app must not have contained any subscription in-app items.
- The features and gameplay of the Amazon Underground version must have been substantially similar to or better than the non-Underground version.
- When submitted to the Amazon Appstore, the app must have been made available on at least one non-Amazon mobile device.

Amazon advised against using Amazon Underground for the following apps:

- Apps that ran continuously in the background
- Apps that were completely free (freely available, no in-app purchases)
- Apps that were monetized through ads
- Apps that supported streaming, such as radio apps
- Apps containing subscription services

In addition, Underground was not recommended for modified versions of an app that removed in-app purchases, or that modified their gameplay by removing in-game currency, or premium apps whose only premium feature was being ad-free.

=== Monetization by Amazon ===
Amazon paid app creators based on the total time spent by users in the app, at a rate of $0.002/minute. In order to monetize Amazon Underground, Amazon showed ads when a user first downloaded an app, and occasionally on each subsequent opening of the app.

== History ==
Amazon Underground launched on August 26, 2015, and Amazon simultaneously retired its daily free app program.

In March 2016, Amazon reported some statistics on the growth of Amazon Underground, leading to renewed media coverage of Amazon Underground.

In April 2017, Amazon announced the program would close to new apps at the end of May 2017, and shut down completely in 2019.

== Reception ==
Amazon Underground was criticized for being much smaller than the Google Play app store, making it of limited utility as a standalone source for getting games.

Goat Simulator performed well on Amazon Underground, leading Wired writer Brian Barrett to argue that the lack of need for payment may have made the app particularly appealing to children, for whom even a small amount of money requires parental consent.

Amazon Underground was praised for helping developers focus on creating engaging in-app experiences rather than worrying about monetizing through in-app purchases. It was also praised for helping all developers make money right off the bat in direct proportion to usage, compared to the in-app purchase model that only some kinds of apps could make significant money off of. Commentators compared it to the Kindle Unlimited plan where Amazon allows readers to read books for free from a diverse collection of authors and then pays authors based on the fraction of their books read.

A report by IHS Technology highlighted the following key challenges for Amazon Underground:

- The challenge of user acquisition, in a world where many apps were free for initial download and monetized through in-app purchases
- Economics that would not fit the needs of all apps
- Strong app store competition, and the fact that Amazon Underground did not come pre-installed on any non-Amazon devices (the bulk of smartphones and tablets)
