= Day 1 (building) =

Office building in Seattle, Washington

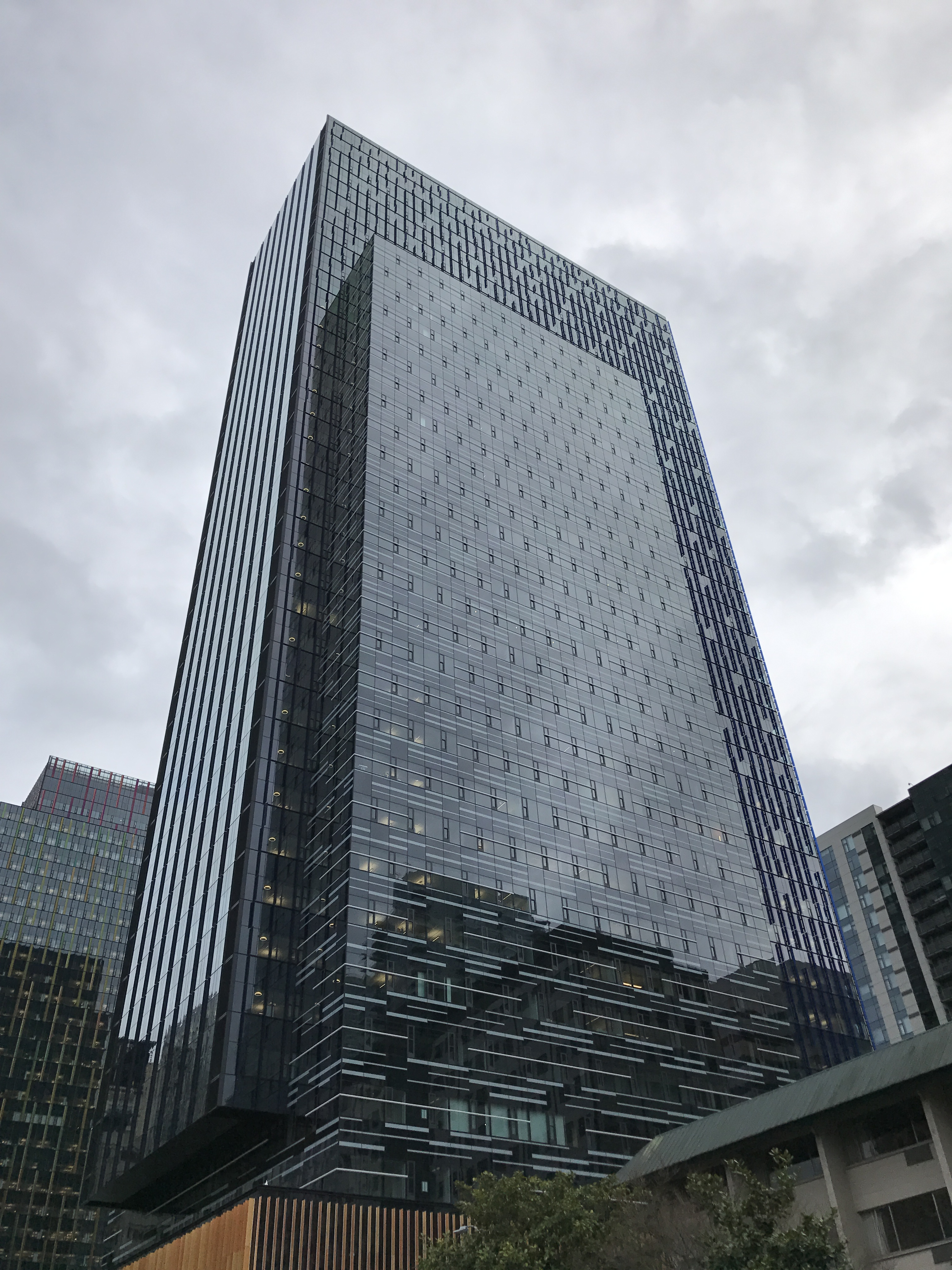
- The northern side of Day 1 from 6th Avenue

- Location within Downtown Seattle
- Alternative names: Amazon Tower II; Rufus 2.0 Block 19

General information
- Status: Completed
- Type: Office building
- Location: 2121 7th Avenue; Seattle, Washington, U.S.
- Coordinates: 47.615868°N 122.339850°W
- Construction started: 2014
- Topped-out: December 4, 2015
- Opened: November 7, 2016
- Cost: $250 million
- Owner: Amazon

Height
- Roof: 521 feet (159 m)

Technical details
- Floor count: 37
- Floor area: 1,485,500 sq ft (138,010 m^{2})

Design and construction
- Architecture firm: NBBJ
- Main contractor: Sellen Construction

Day 1, also known as Amazon Tower II and Rufus 2.0 Block 19, is a 521-foot-tall (159 m) office building in the Denny Triangle neighborhood of Seattle, Washington, located at the intersection of Lenora Street and 7th Avenue. It is part of the three-tower complex that serves as the headquarters of Amazon. The name "Day 1" previously belonged to two buildings on Amazon's South Lake Union campus, but both structures have since been renamed. The building's east facade features a large sign reading "Hello World". The construction project was the most expensive in the city to finish in 2016 amidst the recent downtown housing boom.

The building also housed the prototype Amazon Go location, which opened to a private beta in December 2016 and to the general public on January 22, 2018. The store closed February 1, 2026 when Amazon shuttered all Amazon Go stores.

== Design and construction ==
The Amazon campus, designed by Seattle architecture firm NBBJ and landscape architecture firm Site Workshop, was approved by the Seattle Department of Planning and Development in late 2012. Excavation on the 37-story Tower II began under the direction of Sellen Construction in 2014. It opened on November 7, 2016. The project, covering the entire three-block campus, is also on track to receive LEED Gold certification.

=== Spheres ===
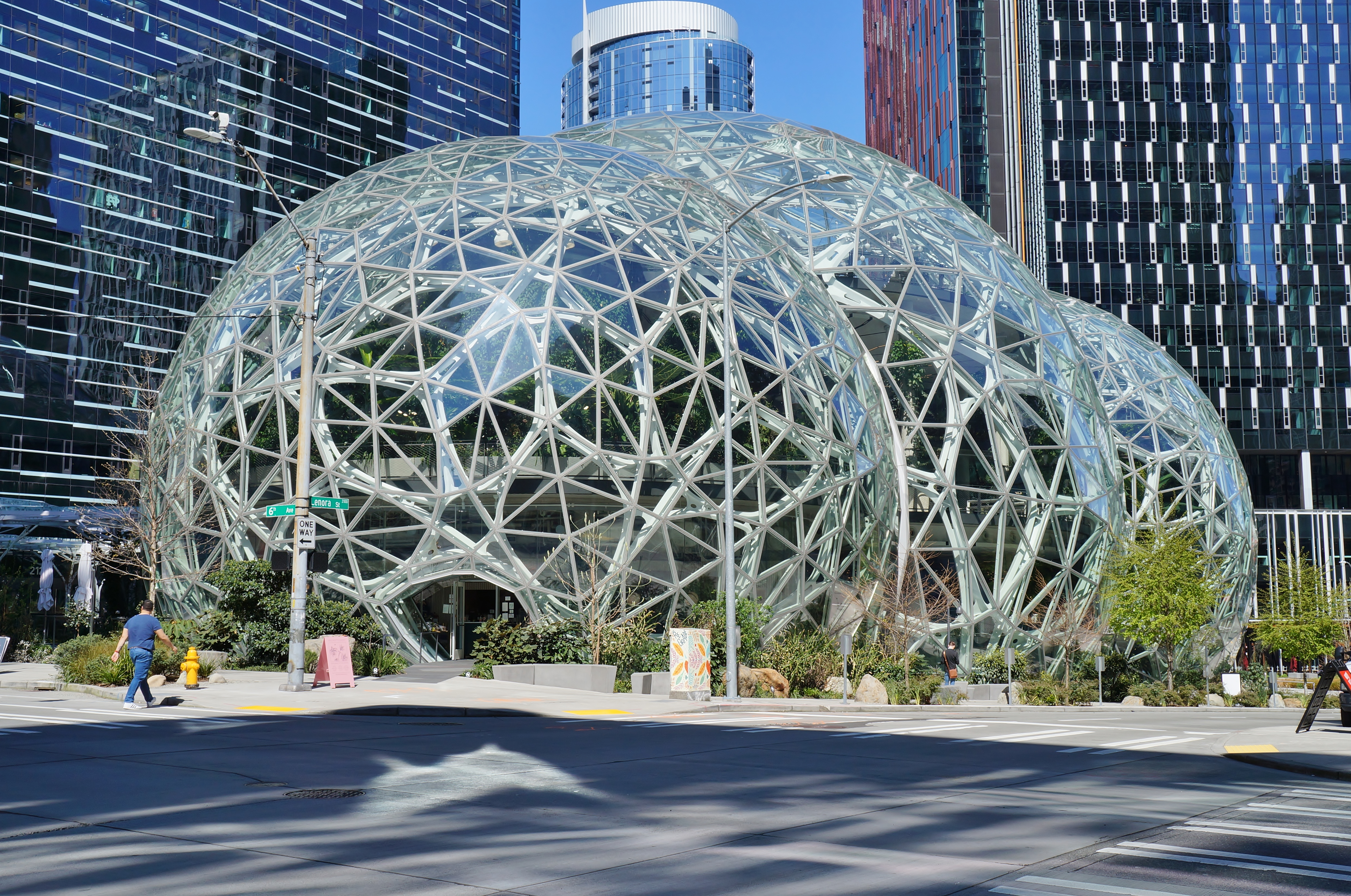

The block also features three intersecting 80-to-90-foot-tall (24 to 27 m) glass-and-steel spheres facing Lenora Street that will house five stories of additional work space for 1,800 employees and retail, totaling 65,000 square feet (6,000 m^{2}). NBBJ intends the spheres to be the "new visual focus and 'heart'" of Amazon's headquarters. The design was showcased by Amazon in 2013, thereby scrapping an earlier plan intending to construct a six-story rectilinear office building in that same location. The architects behind the organic design of the domes relied on the idea that better productivity can be initiated by introducing more sunlight and plants into the work space according to recent research.

When revealed in 2013, the planned design for the spheres, separated from the building by a lawn and dog park, was generally met with support and earned the project international press coverage. One of the few critics included Seattle city design review board member Mathew Albores, who compared its pedestrian hostility to the EMP Museum, offering no rain protection and little retail. The spheres opened on January 31, 2018.

== See also ==
- Doppler (building)
- re:Invent
- List of tallest buildings in Seattle
