= Doppler (building) =

Headquarters of Amazon

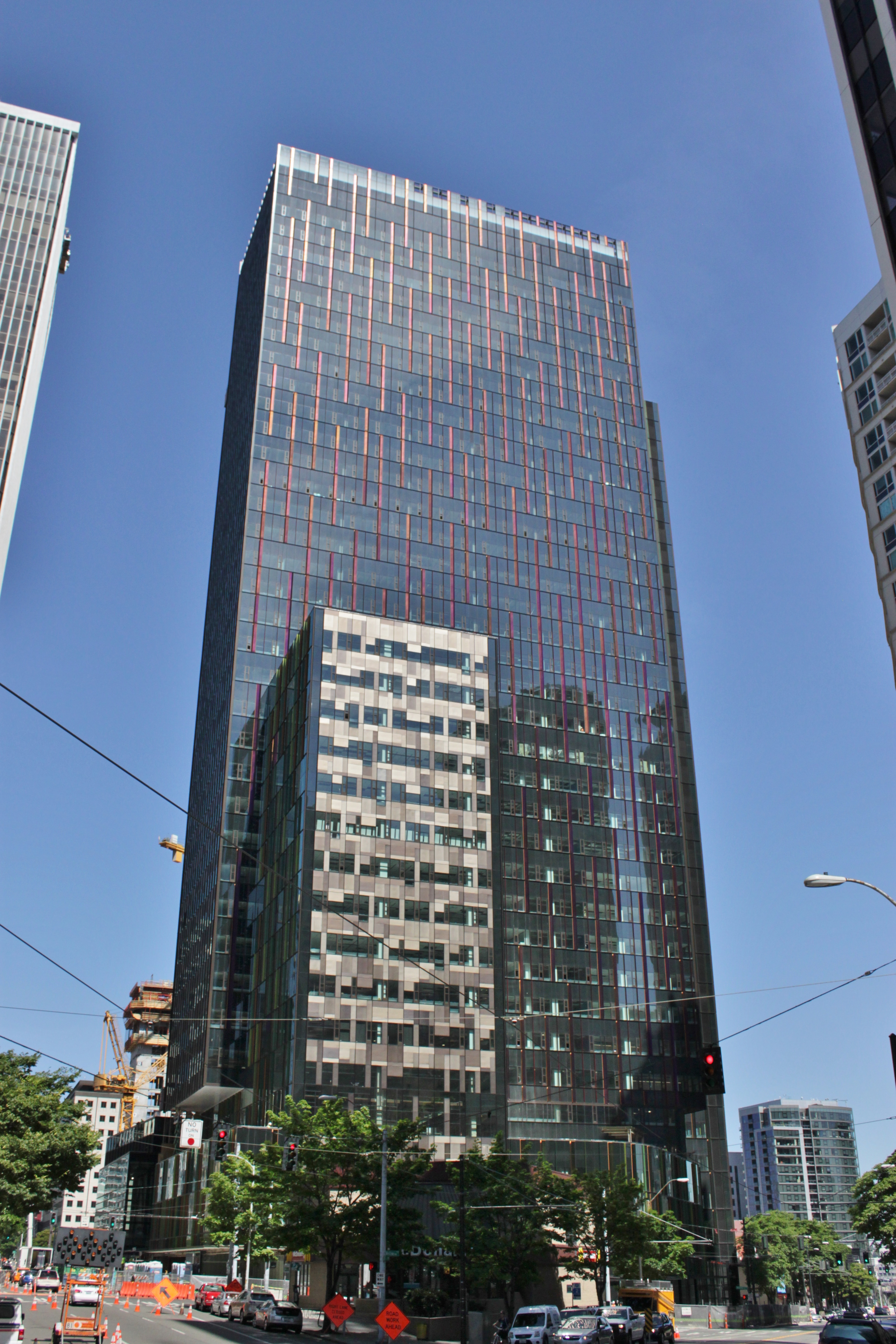
- The Doppler Building near completion in June 2015

- Location within Downtown Seattle
- Alternative names: Amazon Tower I, Rufus 2.0 Block 14

General information
- Status: Completed
- Type: Office building
- Location: 2021 7th Avenue; Seattle, Washington, U.S.
- Coordinates: 47°36′54″N 122°20′18″W
- Construction started: June 3, 2013
- Topped-out: February 25, 2015
- Opened: December 14, 2015
- Owner: Amazon

Height
- Roof: 524 ft (160 m)

Technical details
- Floor count: 37

Design and construction
- Architecture firm: NBBJ
- Main contractor: Sellen Construction

Website
- senecagroup.com/portfolio/amazon-block-14/

Doppler (also known as Amazon Tower I and Rufus 2.0 Block 14) is a 524-foot-tall (160 m) office building in Seattle, Washington, which is home to the corporate headquarters of Amazon. It is located in the Denny Triangle neighborhood of the city, at the intersection of Westlake Avenue and 7th Avenue near the Westlake Center and McGraw Square.

Doppler is part of the three-tower campus that Amazon is developing in the area and is able to accommodate 3,800 employees. The tower takes its name from the internal codename of the Amazon Echo voice-controlled speaker, which launched in 2014.

== Construction ==
The Amazon campus, designed by Seattle architecture firm NBBJ, was approved by the Seattle Department of Planning and Development in late 2012 and excavation on Tower I began under the direction of Sellen Construction in June 2013. The tower was topped out in February 2015 and opened on December 14, 2015.

== Design ==
The 37-story building also has a five-story meeting room center, featuring an amphitheater and stage with stadium-style seating for 2,000, and six stories of underground parking with 1,064 spaces; there is also retail space at the ground level leased out to shops and restaurants, including a Starbucks, Skillet Street Food, Marination, Mamnoon Street, Mamnooncita, Potbelly Sandwich Shop, Cinque Terre Ristorante, and two restaurants from local chef Josh Henderson. The project, covering the entire three-block campus, is also on track to receive LEED Gold certification. The facade uses dichroic glass to reflect light in varying colors dependent on the time of the day.

The site was once proposed for a 31-story mixed-use high-rise, known as the Seventh at Westlake Tower. However, the plans were canceled in 2012 after being on hold for four years.

== See also ==
- Day 1 (building)
- re:Invent
- List of tallest buildings in Seattle
