= Deaths in June 2018 =

The following is a list of notable deaths in June 2018.

Entries for each day are listed alphabetically by surname. A typical entry lists information in the following sequence:

- Name, age, country of citizenship at birth, subsequent country of citizenship (if applicable), reason for notability, cause of death (if known), and reference.

== June 2018 ==
=== 1 ===
- Rudolf Beerbohm, 76, German Olympic equestrian.
- Poldy Bird, 76, Argentine writer.
- Jean-Claude Boulard, 75, French politician, Mayor of Le Mans (since 2001), Senator (2014–2017), and Deputy (1988–1993, 1997–2002).
- Dhiraj Choudhury, 82, Indian painter.
- Eddy Clearwater, 83, American blues singer and guitarist, heart failure.
- Bob Clotworthy, 87, American Hall of Fame diver, Olympic champion (1956) and bronze medalist (1952).
- Jill Ker Conway, 83, Australian-American academic and author, President of Smith College (1975–1985).
- Giovanni Di Veroli, 85, Italian footballer.
- Walter Eich, 93, Swiss footballer (Young Boys, national team).
- Giancarlo Ghirardi, 82, Italian physicist, heart attack.
- Egon Hoegen, 89, German voice actor.
- Hilmar Hoffmann, 92, German film and culture academic.
- Barbara Kafka, 84, American food columnist and cookbook author, complications from Parkinson's disease.
- Shakuntala Karandikar, 86, Indian biographer, essayist and philanthropist.
- Maria Martika, 86, Greek actress.
- Andrew Massey, 72, British-born American conductor, cancer.
- Sam Moore, 88, American Bible publisher.
- Malcolm Morley, 86, English painter.
- Rouzan al-Najjar, 21, Palestinian nurse, shot.
- John Julius Norwich, 88, British historian, travel writer and television personality.
- Alejandro Peñaranda, 24, Colombian footballer, shot.
- Carlo Peretti, 88, Italian water polo player, Olympic bronze medallist (1952).
- William Edward Phipps, 96, American actor (Cinderella, The War of the Worlds, Five), complications from lung cancer.
- Joe Pitman, 93, American Olympic weightlifter.
- Kostas Polychroniou, 81, Greek football player and manager (Olympiacos F.C., national team).
- Lutz Pyritz, 60, German horse racing trainer and jockey.
- Rockin' Rebel, 52, American professional wrestler (ECW, MEWF, CZW), suicide by gunshot.
- Sinan Sakić, 61, Serbian turbo-folk singer.
- Sanusi, 85, Indonesian Olympic cyclist (1960).
- Michael Andrew Screech, 92, British Renaissance scholar.
- René Séjourné, 88, French Roman Catholic prelate, Bishop of Saint-Flour (1990–2006).
- Zuus Undapp, 84, Indonesian Olympic fencer.
- Fred Van Dusen, 80, American baseball player (Philadelphia Phillies).

=== 2 ===
- Mary Baumgartner, 87, American baseball player (AAGPBL).
- Joe Berinson, 86, Australian politician, MHR for Perth (1969–1975), Minister for the Environment and Energy (1975), Attorney-General of Western Australia (1983–1993).
- Steven Allan Boggs, 72, American physicist, brain cancer.
- Paul D. Boyer, 99, American biochemist, Nobel Prize laureate (1997).
- Monte Hill Davis, 86, American classical pianist.
- Sir Desmond de Silva, 78, British lawyer.
- André Desvages, 74, French Olympic racing cyclist (1964).
- Irenäus Eibl-Eibesfeldt, 89, Austrian ethologist.
- William J. Flynn, 91, American businessman and peace activist.
- Vida Ghahremani, 82, Iranian actress and producer.
- Joel Grossman, 81, American political scientist, cancer.
- Bruce Kison, 68, American baseball player (Pittsburgh Pirates, California Angels) and coach (Kansas City Royals), cancer.
- Álvaro Lapuerta, 90, Spanish politician and prosecutor, member of Francoist Courts (1967–1977) and Deputy (1977–2004), complications from dementia.
- Roger A. Madigan, 88, American politician, member of the Pennsylvania House of Representatives (1977–1984) and Senate (1985–2008).
- Fernando Mazariegos, 80, Guatemalan chemist and inventor, Order of the Quetzal (2017), cardiac arrest.
- Nick Meglin, 82, American magazine editor (Mad), heart attack.
- Peter Milner, 98, British-Canadian neuroscientist.
- Tony Morphett, 80, Australian screenwriter (Blue Heelers, Water Rats), heart attack.
- John Ritchie, 70, Scottish football player (Brechin City, Bradford City, Cowdenbeath) and manager.
- Irving Sandler, 92, American art critic, cancer.
- William Simmons, 79, American anthropologist.
- C. C. Torbert Jr., 88, American jurist, Chief Justice of the Alabama Supreme Court (1977–1989).
- Bernard E. Trainor, 89, American journalist and Marine Corps general.
- Emil Wolf, 95, Czech-born American physicist.

=== 3 ===
- Mustapha Akanbi, 85, Nigerian jurist, head of the Independent Corrupt Practices Commission (2000–2005).
- Doug Altman, 69, British statistician, bowel cancer.
- Alessandra Appiano, 59, Italian writer and journalist, suicide.
- Robert Brylewski, 57, Polish singer-songwriter (Armia, Brygada Kryzys, Izrael), injuries sustained from an assault.
- Frank Carlucci, 87, American politician, Secretary of Defense (1987–1989), National Security Advisor (1986–1987), complications from Parkinson's disease.
- Pamela Ann Davy, 84, Australian actress (Doctor Who, The Avengers, Amsterdam Affair).
- Robert Forhan, 82, Canadian Olympic ice hockey player (1960) and politician, Mayor of Newmarket, Ontario (1971–1978).
- Jerry Hopkins, 82, American journalist (Rolling Stone) and biographer (Elvis Presley, Jim Morrison).
- Jek Yeun Thong, 87, Singaporean politician.
- Johnnie Keyes, 78, American pornographic actor (Behind the Green Door), stroke.
- Dadaji Ramaji Khobragade, 79, Indian farmer-scientist.
- Don McComb, 84, American football player (Boston Patriots).
- Kent McCray, 89, American television producer (Little House on the Prairie, Bonanza).
- Leonid Nevedomsky, 78, Soviet-Russian actor (The Blue Bird, Monologue, Deadly Force), People's Artist of Russia.
- Miguel Obando y Bravo, 92, Nicaraguan Roman Catholic cardinal, Archbishop of Managua (1970–2005), heart attack.
- Alan W. Paeth, 63, Canadian computer scientist and author.
- Charley Sarratt, 93, American football player (Detroit Lions).
- Sir John Thomson, 91, British diplomat, High Commissioner to India (1977–1982), Permanent Representative to the United Nations (1982–1987).
- Mario Toros, 95, Italian politician, Deputy (1958–1972) and Senator (1972–1987).
- Gilbert Trausch, 86, Luxembourgish historian.
- Georg von Tiesenhausen, 104, German rocket scientist (Operation Paperclip, Lunar Roving Vehicle).
- Kyra Petrovskaya Wayne, 99, Russian-born American author.

=== 4 ===
- Curt Andersson, 80, Finnish Olympic sport shooter.
- Ron Barton, 85, English boxer.
- Michael J. Belton, 83, American astronomer.
- Joyce Blackham, 84, English operatic mezzo-soprano.
- Seán Calleary, 86, Irish politician, TD (1973–1992).
- Dwight Clark, 61, American football player (San Francisco 49ers), complications from amyotrophic lateral sclerosis.
- Jeffrey Coy, 66, American politician, member of the Pennsylvania House of Representatives (1983–2004).
- Aleksey Desyatchikov, 85, Soviet Olympic athlete (1960).
- Norman Edge, 84, American jazz double-bassist.
- Robert L. Folk, 92, American geologist.
- Mary Jane Fonder, 75, American convicted murderer, cardiac arrest.
- Georgann Johnson, 91, American actress (Dr. Quinn, Medicine Woman, Murphy's Romance, Shoot the Moon).
- Steve Kline, 70, American baseball player (New York Yankees).
- Canel Konvur, 78, Turkish Olympic high jumper (1960).
- J. B. Munro, 81, New Zealand politician and disability advocate, MP for Invercargill (1972–1975).
- C. M. Newton, 88, American Hall of Fame college basketball coach (Alabama Crimson Tide, Vanderbilt Commodores) and administrator (Kentucky Wildcats).
- Dragan Nikolić, 61, Bosnian Serb war criminal.
- Jalal Mansur Nuriddin, 73, American poet and spoken word musician (The Last Poets), cancer.
- Marc Ogeret, 86, French singer.
- Harold Poynton, 82, English rugby league footballer (national team, Yorkshire, Wakefield Trinity).
- William S. Reese, 62, American bookseller, prostate cancer.
- Ahmed Said, 92, Egyptian radio broadcaster (Voice of the Arabs).
- Abhimanyu Unnuth, 80, Mauritian writer, complications from Alzheimer's disease.
- Chris Weller, 78, English footballer (Yeovil Town).
- Gareth Williams, 76, Welsh footballer (Cardiff City, Bolton Wanderers, Bury).

=== 5 ===
- Yoshiaki Arata, 94, Japanese physicist.
- Ira Berlin, 77, American historian, complications from multiple myeloma.
- Jānis Bojārs, 62, Latvian shot putter, European championship silver medalist (1982).
- Frank Bresee, 93, American radio actor and historian.
- Brian Browne, 81, Canadian jazz pianist, lung and tracheal cancer.
- Pierre Carniti, 81, Italian trade unionist and politician, Senator (1992–1994).
- Bruce Coulter, 90, Canadian football player and coach (Montreal Alouettes, Bishop's Gaiters).
- Kay de Villiers, 90, South African neurosurgeon.
- Denman, 18, British racehorse, Cheltenham Gold Cup winner (2008).
- Daša Drndić, 71, Croatian radio playwright (Radio Belgrade) and author, cancer.
- Feng Ting-kuo, 67, Taiwanese politician, Taipei City Councilor (1985–1988), member of the National Assembly (1992–1996) and Legislative Yuan (1996–2008), cardiac arrest.
- A. J. Holloway, 79, American politician, Mayor of Biloxi, Mississippi (1993–2015).
- Hema Nalin Karunaratne, 54, Sri Lankan journalist, intra-ventricular haemorrhage.
- Karl Fritz Lauer, 80, Romanian-German scientist.
- Geoff Mason, 88, Australian football player (Melbourne).
- Richard Maunder, 80, British mathematician and musicologist.
- Edward Nelson Jr., 87, American rear admiral.
- Stacy Phillips, 73, American resophonic guitarist and fiddler.
- Pedyr Prior, 65, British Cornish nationalist politician, Chairman of Mebyon Kernow (1985–1986), complications from prostate cancer and pulmonary fibrosis.
- Darbara Singh, 57, Indian serial killer.
- Kate Spade, 55, American fashion designer (Kate Spade New York), suicide by hanging.
- David Spiller, 75, British pop artist.
- Chuck Taylor, 76, American baseball player (St. Louis Cardinals, Montreal Expos).
- Harry Walker, 103, English rugby union player (Coventry).

=== 6 ===
- Tinus Bosselaar, 82, Dutch footballer (Sparta, Feyenoord, national team).
- Jacques De Brouwere, 80, Belgian Olympic sailor.
- Luigi Campanella, 99, Italian Olympic wrestler (1948).
- Scribner Fauver, 87, American politician.
- Mike Hammond, 72, Australian football player (Richmond).
- Teddy Johnson, 98, English singer (Pearl Carr & Teddy Johnson).
- Ümit Kayıhan, 64, Turkish football player and manager.
- George N. Leighton, 105, American judge (U.S. District Court for the Northern District of Illinois), pneumonia.
- Mateja Matevski, 89, Macedonian poet.
- David McFadden, 77, Canadian poet and travel writer.
- Kira Muratova, 83, Ukrainian film director, screenwriter and actress.
- Alan O'Neill, 47, Irish actor (Sons of Anarchy, Rebel Heart, Fair City), complications from head trauma.
- Larry Owen, 63, American baseball player (Atlanta Braves, Kansas City Royals).
- Monique Papon, 83, French politician, Senator (2001–2011) and Deputy (1986–1997) for Loire-Atlantique.
- Ralph Santolla, 51, American metal guitarist (Deicide, Obituary, Iced Earth), heart attack.
- Red Schoendienst, 95, American Hall of Fame baseball player, manager, and coach (St. Louis Cardinals, New York Giants, Milwaukee Braves).
- Åke Wärnström, 92, Swedish Olympic boxer (1952).
- H. H. Wieder, 99, Romanian-born American physicist.
- Mary Wilson, Lady Wilson of Rievaulx, 102, British poet, spouse of the prime minister (1964–1970, 1974–1976), stroke.
- Ian Wrigley, 95, Australian Olympic sports shooter.
- Franz M. Wuketits, 62, Austrian biologist and epistemologist.
- Cemal Yanılmaz, 84, Turkish Olympic wrestler.

=== 7 ===
- Philippe de Baleine, 96, French author.
- Rasool Bux Palijo, 88, Pakistani politician, scholar and writer, founder of Awami Tahreek.
- Al Capps, 79, American record producer, arranger and composer.
- David Douglas Duncan, 102, American photojournalist.
- Minken Fosheim, 62, Norwegian actress (Karl & Co, Tsatsiki, morsan och polisen) and children's author, pancreatic cancer.
- Fu Da-ren, 85, Taiwanese sports broadcaster, assisted suicide.
- Geoff Gunney, 84, English rugby league player and coach (Hunslet).
- Arie den Hartog, 77, Dutch road bicycle racer.
- Amos Jordan, 96, American scholar and military officer.
- José Marfil Peralta, 97, Spanish WWII soldier and Holocaust survivor.
- Arthur Marshall, 83, Australian politician and tennis player, member of the Western Australian Legislative Assembly (1993–2005).
- Francis Smerecki, 68, French football player (Limoges) and manager (Guingamp, national youth team).
- Peter Stringfellow, 77, English businessman and nightclub owner, cancer.
- Viktor Tolmachev, 83, Russian airplane designer and engineer (Antonov).
- Gena Turgel, 95, Polish author, Holocaust survivor and educator.
- Cliff van Blerk, 79, Australian footballer.
- Michaele Vollbracht, 70, American fashion designer, esophageal cancer.
- Oulton Wade, Baron Wade of Chorlton, 85, British politician, member of the House of Lords (1990–2016).
- Sir Neil Waters, 87, New Zealand chemist and university administrator, vice-chancellor of Massey University (1983–1995).
- Stefan Weber, 71, Austrian singer.
- Yao Baoqian, 93, Chinese People's Liberation Army officer, commander of the 24th Group Army.

=== 8 ===
- Ibrahim Abiriga, 62, Ugandan politician and military officer, shot.
- Per Ahlmark, 79, Swedish politician and writer, Deputy Prime Minister (1976–1978) and leader of the Liberal People's Party (1975–1978).
- Helen Chatfield Black, 94, American conservationist.
- Jack Borotsik, 68, Canadian ice hockey player (St. Louis Blues).
- Gérard Boulanger, 69, French lawyer and politician, cancer.
- Anthony Bourdain, 61, American chef, author and television host (No Reservations, Parts Unknown, The Layover), four-time Emmy winner, suicide by hanging.
- Vin Bruce, 86, American Cajun musician.
- Maria Bueno, 78, Brazilian tennis player, Wimbledon winner (1959, 1960, 1964), mouth cancer.
- Mark Buntzman, 68, American film director and screenwriter (Exterminator 2).
- Freddy Eugen, 77, Danish racing cyclist.
- Eunice Gayson, 90, British actress (Dr. No, From Russia with Love, The Revenge of Frankenstein).
- Mark "Monk" Hubbard, 47, American skateboarder.
- Danny Kirwan, 68, British Hall of Fame guitarist (Fleetwood Mac, Tramp), pneumonia.
- Ed Knecht, 90, American football coach.
- Pat Lally, 92, Scottish politician, Lord Provost of Glasgow (1996–1999).
- Liu Jianfu, 100, Chinese politician, police chief and vice mayor of Beijing.
- Liu Yichang, 99, Hong Kong novelist, editor and publisher, a founder of Hong Kong's modern literature.
- Jutta Nardenbach, 49, German footballer.
- Thodoros Papadimitriou, 87, Greek sculptor.
- Janko Pleterski, 95, Slovenian historian, politician and diplomat.
- Gino Santercole, 77, Italian singer and songwriter, heart attack.
- Leo Sarkisian, 97, American musicologist and broadcaster.
- Henry Sharratt, 82, English rugby league player.
- Theodore J. Sophocleus, 79, American politician, member of the Maryland House of Delegates (1993–1995, since 1999).
- Thomas Stuttaford, 87, British doctor and politician, MP (1970–1974).
- Kandala Subrahmanyam, 97, Indian politician.

=== 9 ===
- Joan Bernard Armstrong, 77, American judge.
- Martin Birrane, 82, Irish businessman, racing driver and team owner (Lola Cars).
- Françoise Bonnot, 78, French film editor (Z, Frida, Hanna K.), Oscar winner (1970).
- Rubin Braunstein, 96, American physicist.
- Richard H. Bube, 90, American physicist, materials scientist and theistic evolutionist.
- Paul Busch, 63, German-born British mathematical physicist.
- Deborah Cameron, 59, Australian journalist (The Sydney Morning Herald) and radio presenter (ABC Radio Sydney), cancer.
- Kristine Ciesinski, 65, American opera singer, glider crash.
- Ogobara Doumbo, 62, Malian scientist.
- Robert Fine, 72–73, British sociologist.
- Murray Fromson, 88, American journalist (CBS News) and professor (University of Southern California), complications from Alzheimer's disease.
- Crawford Gates, 96, American composer and conductor.
- Lorraine Gordon, 95, American jazz club owner (Village Vanguard), stroke.
- Paul Gorham, 57, American college football player and coach, lung disease.
- George Grubb, 82, British politician, Lord Provost of Edinburgh (2007–2012).
- John Wesley Hanes III, 93, American civil servant.
- Agneta Hannerz, 81, Swedish Olympic sprinter.
- Reinhard Hardegen, 105, German U-boat commander (Battle of the Atlantic).
- Kenyatta Jones, 39, American football player (New England Patriots, Washington Redskins), cardiac arrest.
- Clemens Kalischer, 97, American photojournalist.
- Sylwester Kubica, 68, Polish Olympic gymnast (1968, 1972).
- Harry Lampman, 90, Canadian football player (Saskatchewan Roughriders, Hamilton Tiger-Cats, Montreal Alouettes).
- Lin Yu-lin, 81, Taiwanese real estate developer.
- Lauri Linna, 87, Finnish politician, MP (1970–1975).
- John McKenzie, 80, Canadian ice hockey player (Boston Bruins, Chicago Blackhawks).
- Shantaram Naik, 72, Indian politician, member of the Rajya Sabha (2005–2017), heart attack.
- Janetta Parladé, 96, British socialite.
- Thomas Rocher, 87, Australian cricketer.
- Somaweera Senanayake, 74, Sri Lankan screenwriter, novelist and journalist, heart attack.
- Laliteshwar Prasad Shahi, 97, Indian politician.
- Sammy Skobel, 92, American roller derby skater.
- Bryan Todd, 80, English rugby league player.
- Fadil Vokrri, 58, Kosovar football player (Prishtina, Yugoslavian national team), president of Football Federation of Kosovo (since 2008), cardiac arrest.
- Frances Walker-Slocum, 94, American pianist and educator.
- Zhang Junzhao, 65, Chinese film director and screenwriter (One and Eight, The Shining Arc).

=== 10 ===
- Stan Anderson, 85, English football player (Sunderland, Newcastle United, Middlesbrough) and manager.
- Sir Frederick Atkinson, 98, British civil servant, head of the Government Economic Service (1977–1979).
- Douglas J. Bennet, 79, American diplomat and educator, President of Wesleyan University (1995–2007).
- Neal E. Boyd, 42, American singer and reality show winner (America's Got Talent), heart and kidney failure and liver disease.
- Dorothy Cotton, 88, American civil rights activist (Southern Christian Leadership Conference).
- Jim Crawford, 82, American football player (Boston Patriots).
- Nils Terje Dalseide, 66, Norwegian judge and civil servant.
- Harold L. Dibble, 66, American archaeologist, pancreatic cancer.
- Paddy Feeny, 87, British broadcaster (BBC World Service).
- Howard Gardiner, 74, Zimbabwean cricketer.
- Pavlos Giannakopoulos, 89, Greek businessman and sport administrator (Panathinaikos A.O.).
- James Gips, 72, American technologist.
- Ben Hills, 76, British-born Australian investigative journalist, cancer.
- Hala bint D'aij Al Khalifa, Bahraini royal.
- Ras Kimono, 60, Nigerian reggae musician.
- Zella Luria, 94, American psychologist.
- Tom McEwen, 81, American drag racer, cardiopulmonary arrest.
- Walter Pitman, 89, Canadian politician.
- André Pourny, 89, French politician, Senator (1986–2004).
- Liliana Ross, 79, Italian-born Chilean actress (La Colorina, Machos).
- Edward Sadlowski, 79, American labor activist, complications from dementia.
- Axel Schmidt, 79, Brazilian Olympic sailor (1968, 1972), Pan American champion (1959).
- Christopher Stasheff, 74, American author (The Warlock in Spite of Himself, Starship Troupers, The Enchanter Reborn), complications from Parkinson's disease.
- Erling Storrusten, 94, Norwegian businessman.
- Eurico Surgey, 86, Portuguese Olympic swimmer.
- Yirmiyahu Yovel, 82, Israeli philosopher.

=== 11 ===
- Norma Bessouet, 77, Argentine artist.
- Maria Butaciu, 78, Romanian folk singer.
- John Coates, 85, Australian army general.
- Wayne Dockery, 76, American jazz double bassist.
- Irene Doutney, 69, Australian politician, cancer.
- Oscar Furlong, 90, Argentine Olympic basketball player (1948, 1952), tennis player and coach, FIBA Basketball World Cup MVP (1950).
- Bonaldo Giaiotti, 85, Italian opera singer.
- Roilo Golez, 71, Filipino politician, Postmaster General and adviser to the National Security Council, heart attack.
- Marcel Hénaff, 75, French philosopher and anthropologist.
- Yvette Horner, 95, French accordionist.
- Victoria Kalima, 45, Zambian politician, Minister of Gender (since 2016).
- Roman Kłosowski, 89, Polish actor (Before Twilight).
- Adel Mahmoud, 76, Egyptian-American infectious-disease expert credited with the HPV and rotavirus vaccines, brain hemorrhage.
- A. M. Paraman, 91, Indian politician.
- Rumen Petkov, 70, Bulgarian animator and director (Aaahh!!! Real Monsters, Johnny Bravo, Dexter's Laboratory), Palme d'Or winner (1985).
- Jeanne Sandford, 88, British Olympic alpine skier.
- John Shepherd, 86, English footballer (Millwall, Brighton & Hove Albion, Gillingham).
- Larry Thomas, 70, American political advisor, cancer.
- Anne Vainikka, 59, Finnish-American linguist, cancer.

=== 12 ===
- Ram Chander Bainda, 72, Indian politician, member of the Lok Sabha (1996–2004).
- Yakov Brand, 63, Russian cardiac surgeon and TV presenter.
- Robert Alan Browne, 86, American actor (Santa Barbara, Psycho).
- Zé Carlos, 73, Brazilian footballer.
- Patricia Adkins Chiti, British-born Italian musician and musicologist.
- Jack Cuffe, 87, Australian footballer.
- Helena Dunicz-Niwińska, 102, Polish violinist, translator and author.
- Keith Fahnhorst, 66, American football player (San Francisco 49ers).
- Jon Hiseman, 73, English drummer (Colosseum, Colosseum II, John Mayall & the Bluesbreakers), brain cancer.
- Albert Kocer, 87, American politician.
- Antônio Carlos Konder Reis, 94, Brazilian politician, Senator (1963–1975), Deputy (1955–1963, 1987–1991, 1998–2003), governor of Santa Catarina (1975–1979, 1994–1995).
- Jarosław Kozidrak, 63, Polish guitarist, keyboardist and composer.
- Jack Laxer, 91, American photographer.
- Bhaiyyu Maharaj, 50, Indian spiritual guru, suicide by gunshot.
- Al Meltzer, 89, American sportscaster.
- Kelvin Mullarkey, 67, English motorcycle speedway rider.
- Basil Ramsey, 89, British music publisher.
- Stephen Reid, 68, Canadian author and bank robber (The Stopwatch Gang), heart failure and complications of pneumonia.
- Pandel Savic, 92, Macedonian-born American football player (Ohio State Buckeyes), complications from Alzheimer's disease.
- Jack Shreve, 85, American politician.
- Freddy Sofian, 69, Indonesian artist.
- Renato Vrbičić, 47, Croatian water polo player, Olympic silver medalist (1996), heart attack.

=== 13 ===
- Myrtle Allen, 94, Irish chef, restaurateur (Ballymaloe House) and hotelier, Michelin star winner, pneumonia.
- Benedetto Cottone, 100, Italian politician, Deputy (1953–1958, 1963–1976).
- Arkangel de la Muerte, 52, Mexican professional wrestler (CMLL), heart attack.
- Eurydice Dixon, 22, Australian comedian, strangulation.
- Anne Donovan, 56, American Hall of Fame basketball player and coach, Olympic champion (1984, 1988, 2008), heart failure.
- John Farley, 85, British pilot.
- D. J. Fontana, 87, American Hall of Fame rock drummer (Elvis Presley).
- Tom Gear, 69, American politician, member of the Virginia House of Delegates (2002–2010).
- J. Alex Haller, 91, American pediatric surgeon (Johns Hopkins School of Medicine).
- Rory Kiely, 84, Irish politician, Cathaoirleach of Seanad Éireann (2002–2007).
- Jordan McNair, 19, American football player, heat stroke.
- Ronald I. Meshbesher, 85, American lawyer, complications from Alzheimer's disease.
- Milan Mrkusich, 93, New Zealand artist and designer.
- Charles Vinci, 85, American weightlifter, Olympic champion (1956, 1960).

=== 14 ===
- Robin Boyd, 94, Irish theologian and missionary.
- Shujaat Bukhari, 50, Indian journalist, shot.
- Gene Ceppetelli, 78, Canadian-born American football player (Philadelphia Eagles, Hamilton Tiger-Cats, Montreal Alouettes).
- Fazlullah, 43, Pakistani Sharia advocate and insurgent, leader of TNSM (since 2002) and TTP (since 2013), drone strike.
- Yvonne Gilan, 86, British actress (Fawlty Towers, Chariots of Fire, Empire of the Sun), breast and lung cancer.
- Stanislav Govorukhin, 82, Russian film director, screenwriter and politician.
- Vincent R. Gray, 96, British-born New Zealand chemist and climate change denier.
- Deanna Kamiel, 71, Canadian-born American filmmaker.
- Mongi Kooli, 88, Tunisian politician.
- Steve Kuzmicich, 86, New Zealand statistician.
- Archibald Montgomerie, 18th Earl of Eglinton, 78, British aristocrat.
- Ed Roebuck, 86, American baseball player (Brooklyn/Los Angeles Dodgers, Philadelphia Phillies).
- Ettore Romoli, 80, Italian politician, Senator (1994–1996) and Deputy (2001–2006).
- Sonia Scurfield, 89, Canadian sports team owner (Calgary Flames), cancer.
- Gunnar Vada, 91, Norwegian politician, MP (1977–1986).
- Marta Weigle, 73, American folklorist and anthropologist.

=== 15 ===
- Gerald Barnbaum, 84, American pharmacist and fraudster.
- Nina Baym, 82, American literary critic and historian, complications from dementia.
- Delia Bell, 83, American bluegrass singer.
- Manuel José Bonnet, 81, Colombian soldier, academic (Del Rosario University) and politician, Commandant of the Army (1996–1997), Governor of Magdalena (2010–2012), cancer.
- Milton Clark, 95, Australian footballer (Essendon, North Melbourne).
- Joe DeNardo, 87, American meteorologist (WTAE).
- Leslie Grantham, 71, English actor (EastEnders, Fort Boyard, The Paradise Club) and convicted murderer, lung cancer.
- Enoch zu Guttenberg, 71, German conductor.
- Frank Harden, 95, American radio announcer.
- Fathi Khorshid, 80, Egyptian Olympic footballer.
- Arne Martin Klausen, 90, Norwegian social anthropologist.
- Nick Knox, 60, American drummer (The Cramps, Electric Eels).
- Joseph Li Mingshu, 93, Chinese clandestine Roman Catholic prelate, Bishop of Qingdao (since 2000).
- Buddy MacEachern, 77, Canadian politician, complications from Alzheimer's disease.
- Rita Marko, 98, Albanian politician.
- Richard Millard, 103, American Episcopal prelate, Bishop of California (1960-1978).
- Matt Murphy, 88, American blues guitarist (The Blues Brothers & Howlin' Wolf).
- Max W. Noah, 86, American lieutenant general.
- Raoul Van Caenegem, 90, Belgian historian.
- Darío Villalba, 79, Spanish painter, photographer and Olympic figure skater (1956).
- Macdara Woods, 76, Irish poet.

=== 16 ===
- María José Alcón, 57, Spanish jurist and politician, Valencia city councilor (1995–2009), fall.
- Alvarito, 82, Spanish football player (Real Oviedo, Atlético Madrid), and manager (Shelbourne).
- Martin Bregman, 92, American film producer (Scarface, Dog Day Afternoon, Carlito's Way), cerebral hemorrhage.
- Margaret Canovan, 79, English author and political theorist.
- Cecile Cilliers, 85, South African writer.
- Antonio Giuliano, 88, Italian classical archaeologist and historian.
- Richard Alan Greenberg, 71, American special effects artist (Predator, Zelig) and film director (Little Monsters), appendicitis.
- Russell MacNeil, 87, Canadian politician.
- Nicholas Mastromatteo, 84, American luger.
- Syd Nomis, 76, South African rugby union player (Transvaal, national team), heart attack.
- M. Azizur Rahman, 77, Canadian electrical engineer.
- Gennady Rozhdestvensky, 87, Russian conductor.
- Nancy Rust, 89, American politician.
- Remo Segnana, 92, Italian politician, Senator (1968–1983).
- Victor Shabangu, 48, Swazi Olympic athlete.
- Ronnie Sheed, 71, Scottish footballer (Kilmarnock, Partick Thistle).
- George Stamatoyannopoulos, 84, Greek-born American medical researcher and geneticist.
- Euan Howard, 4th Baron Strathcona and Mount Royal, 94, British politician, member of House of Lords (1959–1999).
- Ken Wood, 88, Australian swimming coach.

=== 17 ===
- John Blayney, 93, Irish judge and rugby union player.
- Elizabeth Brackett, 76, American television journalist (Chicago Tonight, PBS NewsHour), neck injury from bicycle fall.
- William Chong Wong, 67, Honduran economist and politician, Minister of Finance (2004–2006, 2010–2012), co-founder of Central American Technological University, respiratory failure.
- Hellmut Fritzsche, 91, German-born American physicist, assisted suicide.
- Web Harrison, 78, American football player and coach (Bates Bobcats).
- Troy Hurtubise, 54, Canadian inventor and conservationist, subject of Project Grizzly, traffic collision.
- Derek Ingram, 93, English journalist.
- Igor Muradyan, 61, Armenian political activist.
- O. Timothy O'Meara, 90, American mathematician.
- Rebecca Parris, 66, American jazz singer.
- Aihud Pevsner, 92, American physicist.
- John W. Pilley, 89, American behavioral psychologist.
- Dutch Rennert, 88, American baseball umpire.
- Stephen E. Robinson, 70, American religious scholar.
- David Selberg, 23, Swedish ice hockey player (Luleå, Piteå), suicide.
- Andrei Stepanov, 88, Russian diplomat and author.
- Zhao Nanqi, 91, Korean-born Chinese general and politician, Director of the People's Liberation Army General Logistics Department.
- Franco Zurlo, 77, Italian Olympic boxer, European bantamweight champion (1969–1971, 1977–1978).

=== 18 ===
- Ahmad Ahmadi, 84, Iranian Islamic philosopher, heart attack.
- Walter Bahr, 91, American Hall of Fame soccer player (Philadelphia Nationals, national team), complications from a broken hip.
- Antonios Bonas, 70, Greek Olympic sailor.
- Billy Connors, 76, American baseball player (Chicago Cubs, New York Mets) and coach (New York Yankees).
- Graham Davy, 81, New Zealand athlete and sports administrator.
- Ivor Dennis, 86, Sri Lankan singer.
- Upendra Devkota, 64, Nepalese neurosurgeon, gallbladder cancer.
- Paul Gratzik, 82, German writer.
- Ron Healey, 65, Irish footballer (Manchester City, Cardiff City, national team).
- Gō Katō, 80, Japanese actor, gallbladder cancer.
- Theerasak Longji, 26, Thai murderer, execution by lethal injection.
- Barry McDaniel, 87, American opera singer.
- Gordon Norton, 93, Canadian yacht racer.
- Kostas Politis, 76, Greek basketball coach (national team), EuroBasket champion (1987).
- Claude Ramsey, 75, American politician, member of the Tennessee House of Representatives (1972–1978).
- Felix Rappaport, 65, American casino operator (Foxwoods Casino), heart disease.
- Maria Rohm, 72, Austrian actress (99 Women, Venus in Furs).
- Billy Sammeth, 66, American talent manager (Dolly Parton, Cher, Joan Rivers), pancreatic cancer.
- Bertha Sanseverino, 72, Uruguayan politician, member of the Departmental Board of Montevideo (1995–2004) and the Chamber of Representatives (since 2010).
- Nathan Shaham, 93, Israeli writer.
- Lawrence A. Skantze, 89, American military officer.
- Marta Terry González, 87, Cuban librarian.
- Big Van Vader, 63, American professional wrestler (NJPW, WWF) and football player (Los Angeles Rams), heart failure and pneumonia.
- Richard Valeriani, 85, American NBC News correspondent.
- Magalì Vettorazzo, 76, Italian Olympic pentathlete (1968).
- Jimmy Wopo, 21, American rapper, shot.
- David Wrench, 81, British rugby union player and politician.
- XXXTentacion, 20, American rapper ("Look at Me", "Jocelyn Flores", "Sad!"), shot.

=== 19 ===
- Stanley Cavell, 91, American philosopher, heart failure.
- Ivan Drach, 81, Ukrainian poet, screenwriter and politician, member of Verkhovna Rada (1990–1994, 1998–2000, 2002–2006).
- Efrén Echeverría, 86, Paraguayan musician, composer, and record collector.
- Princess Elisabeth of Denmark, 83, Danish princess.
- Katriina Elovirta, 57, Finnish football player and referee (FIFA, UEFA), Finnish Women's Cup champion (1990).
- C. H. Gimingham, 95, British botanist.
- Sergio Gonella, 85, Italian Hall of Fame football referee (1978 FIFA World Cup Final).
- Hubert Green, 71, American Hall of Fame golfer, U.S. Open (1977) and PGA (1985) champion, throat cancer.
- Matthew Grimson, 50, Canadian musician, suicide.
- Stefan Kanfer, 85, American journalist (Time).
- Bill Kenville, 87, American basketball player (Syracuse Nationals, Detroit Pistons).
- Chuck Klingbeil, 52, American football player (Miami Dolphins).
- Koko, 46, western lowland gorilla known for her intelligence and capacity to understand sign language.
- Paul John Marx, 83, French Roman Catholic prelate, Bishop of Kerema (Papua New Guinea) (1988–2010).
- Don Mason, 73, American baseball player (San Francisco Giants, San Diego Padres).
- Leonard McComb, 87, British painter.
- Ángel Medardo Luzuriaga, 82, Ecuadorian Andean cumbia musician.
- Ian Orme, 65, British-American microbiologist.
- Bansi Quinteros, 41, Spanish keyboardist (GMS), blood cancer.
- Gillian Raine, 91, British actress (Last of the Long-haired Boys, The Hour).
- Jean Rikhoff, 92, American author and editor.
- Nicholas Rudall, 78, British academic and theatre director, colon and liver cancer.
- Jane Cronin Scanlon, 95, American mathematician.
- Lowrell Simon, 75, American soul singer-songwriter (The Lost Generation).
- Jack Stallings, 87, American baseball coach (Georgia Southern Eagles).
- Nerella Venu Madhav, 85, Indian impressionist.
- Frank Vickery, 67, Welsh playwright.
- Peter Wilmot-Sitwell, 83, British stockbroker, stroke.

=== 20 ===
- Ken Albiston, 91, Australian footballer (Richmond, Melbourne).
- David Bianco, 63–64, American record producer, engineer and mixer (Tom Petty, Teenage Fanclub, Bob Dylan), stroke.
- Errikos Briolas, 84, Greek actor.
- Dante Caputo, 74, Argentine diplomat and politician, President of the United Nations General Assembly (1988–1989), Minister of Foreign Relations (1983–1989).
- Dick Danehe, 97, American football player (Los Angeles Dons).
- Brian Donovan, 77, American journalist (Newsday), Pulitzer Prize winner (1970, 1995), complications from Alzheimer's disease.
- Robert Gilpin, 87, American political scientist.
- Norman Godman, 81, Scottish politician, MP (1983–2001).
- Sophie Gradon, 32, British reality television participant (Love Island) and beauty pageant winner (Miss Great Britain, 2009).
- Francisco Griéguez, 99, Spanish WWII soldier and Holocaust survivor.
- Lesandro Guzman-Feliz, 15, American homicide victim, stabbed.
- Bill Hendon, 73, American politician, member of the U.S. House of Representatives for North Carolina's 11th district (1981–1983, 1985–1987).
- Hu Wei, 97, Chinese general, Deputy Chief of Staff of the People's Liberation Army (1974–1984).
- Ernie Hunt, 75, English football player (Swindon Town, Wolverhampton Wanderers, Coventry City), complications from Alzheimer's disease.
- Margaret Ann Ireland, 90, Canadian pianist.
- Sándor Kányádi, 89, Hungarian poet and translator.
- Don C. Laubman, 96, Canadian fighter pilot and flying ace.
- Wolfgang Lippert, 80, German botanist.
- Carroll Morgan, 70, Canadian Olympic boxer (1972), heart attack.
- Bill Quimby, 81, American author and columnist.
- Willie Lee Rose, 91, American historian.
- Kevin J. Ryan, 49, American politician.
- Bill Speakman, 90, British soldier, recipient of the Victoria Cross.
- Peter Thomson, 88, Australian Hall of Fame golfer, five-time British Open winner (1954, 1955, 1956, 1958, 1965), complications from Parkinson's disease.
- Solveig Laila Thoresen, 87, Norwegian politician.
- John Ward, 88, American sportscaster (Vol Network).
- Mushtaq Ahmad Yusufi, 94, Pakistani banker, writer and humorist.

=== 21 ===
- William Acker, 90, American judge.
- Bob Bain, 94, American guitarist.
- Grigory Barenblatt, 90, Russian mathematician.
- Carlo Bernardini, 88, Italian politician, Senator (1976–1979).
- Hassan El Glaoui, 93, Moroccan painter.
- Édouard-Jean Empain, 80, French-Belgian industrialist (Schneider-Empain) and kidnapping victim.
- H. Tristram Engelhardt Jr., 77, American philosopher.
- Johnny Hubbard, 87, South African footballer (Rangers, Bury, Ayr United).
- Oldřich Král, 87, Czech sinologist and translator.
- Charles Krauthammer, 68, American political commentator (Fox News) and writer (The Washington Post), Pulitzer Prize winner (1987), small intestine cancer.
- Felicia Langer, 87, Israeli-German human rights activist.
- George Lindemann, 81, American businessman.
- John Mack, 81, American civic leader, cancer.
- Jamsheed Marker, 95, Pakistani diplomat, Ambassador to the United States (1986–1989).
- Elsa Massa, 93, Argentine human rights activist.
- Armando Merodio, 82, Spanish footballer (Athletic Bilbao).
- Horațiu Nicolau, 84, Romanian Olympic volleyball player.
- Eric Stanley, 94, British literary scholar and historian.
- Sir Laurence Street, 91, Australian judge, Chief Justice of New South Wales (1974–1988).
- Hugh Stuckey, 89, Australian comedy and drama writer.
- Bill Thompson, 80, American politician, member of the Wyoming House of Representatives (2001–2011).
- William F. Ward Jr., 89, American major general.
- Yan Jizhou, 100, Chinese film director, winner of the Golden Rooster Award for Lifetime Achievement.

=== 22 ===
- Halina Aszkiełowicz-Wojno, 71, Polish volleyball player (national team), Olympic bronze medalist (1968).
- Tony Bartirome, 86, American baseball player (Pittsburgh Pirates).
- James Eugene Broadwell, 97, American aeronautical engineer.
- Geoff Case, 82, Australian football player (Melbourne).
- Steve Condous, 82, Australian politician, Lord Mayor of Adelaide (1987–1993), member of the South Australian House of Assembly (1993–2002).
- James S. Denton, 66, American publisher and editor (World Affairs), prostate cancer.
- Leslie C. Klink, 91, American politician.
- Fred Kornet, 98, American Army lieutenant general.
- Nahum Korzhavin, 92, Russian-American poet.
- Olga Krzyżanowska, 88, Polish politician, Senator (2001–2005), Deputy Marshal of the Sejm (1993–1997).
- Melanie Le Brocquy, 98, Irish sculptor.
- Dick Leitsch, 83, American LGBT rights activist, liver cancer.
- Dan Lindsley, 92, American geneticist.
- Helli Louise, 68, Danish-English actress (Daddy, Darling).
- Deanna Lund, 81, American actress (Land of the Giants), pancreatic cancer.
- Jahi McMath, 17, American persistent vegetative state patient, liver failure.
- Nandagopal, 84, Indian film journalist, editor and critic.
- Rezső Nyers, 95, Hungarian politician, Minister of Finance (1960–1962), Hungarian Socialist Workers' Party president (1989).
- Geoffrey Oryema, 65, Ugandan musician.
- Vinnie Paul, 54, American drummer (Pantera, Damageplan, Hellyeah), heart attack.
- Sally Pierone, 97, American artist and family counselor.
- Waldir Pires, 91, Brazilian politician, Minister of Defence (2006–2007), Governor of Bahia (1987–1989).
- Bagun Sumbrai, 94, Indian politician.

=== 23 ===
- Roland Baar, 53, German rower, Olympic silver (1996) and bronze medallist (1992), five-time world champion (1989, 1990, 1991, 1993, 1995), traffic collision.
- Fred Chalenor, 62, American bassist.
- Tom Chambers, 89, Canadian politician.
- Jacques Corriveau, 85, Canadian graphic design executive, convicted in Adscam scandal.
- Alberto Fouillioux, 77, Chilean footballer (national team).
- Donald Hall, 89, American poet, U.S. Poet Laureate (2006).
- John Holer, 82, Slovenian-born Canadian businessman.
- Ann Hopkins, 74, American business executive, plaintiff in Price Waterhouse v Hopkins.
- Yavar Jamalov, 68, Azerbaijani politician, Minister of Defence Industry (since 2006).
- Kim Jong-pil, 92, South Korean politician, Prime Minister (1971–1975, 1998–2000).
- Gisèle Lamoureux, 75, Canadian botanist and photographer.
- Richard Lowitt, 96, American historian.
- Edna Maskell, 90, South African Olympic hurdler.
- Dumitru Moțpan, 78, Moldovan politician, President of Parliament (1997–1998).
- Phan Huy Lê, 84, Vietnamese historian, heart disease.
- Douglas Rae, 87, Scottish businessman.
- Violeta Rivas, 80, Argentine singer and actress, kidney failure.
- Gazmend Sinani, 27, Kosovan basketball player (Leeds Force), traffic collision.
- Ronald Spadafora, 63, American firefighter (FDNY Chief of Fire Prevention), supervised rescue and recovery following 9/11, acute myeloid leukemia.
- Cyrus Tang, 88, Chinese-born American investor and philanthropist.
- Lucile A. Watts, 97, American judge.
- Koro Wētere, 83, New Zealand politician, MP for Western Maori (1969–1996), Minister of Māori Affairs (1984–1990).

=== 24 ===
- Xiomara Alfaro, 88, Cuban opera singer.
- César Alvarenga, Paraguayan politician, Governor of San Pedro Department (1998–1999), heart attack.
- Stanley Anderson, 78, American actor (The Drew Carey Show, Spider-Man, Red Dragon), brain cancer.
- Keith Bosley, 80, British poet and translator.
- Edward M. Burgess, 84, American chemist.
- Salomón Cohen Levy, 91, Israeli-born Venezuelan civil engineer and mall developer (Centro Sambil).
- Geoff Dench, 77, British social scientist.
- Francesco Forleo, 76, Italian politician, Deputy (1987–1994), complications from dementia.
- Don Garren, 84, American lawyer and politician.
- Frank Heart, 89, American Hall of Fame computer engineer, co-developer of the IMP, melanoma.
- Dan Ingram, 83, American disc jockey (KBOX, WABC, WCBS-FM, WIL), complications from dementia.
- Michael Lockwood, 74, British philosopher, complications from Alzheimer's disease.
- Darryl N. Johnson, 80, American diplomat.
- Sergei Ogorodnikov, 32, Russian ice hockey player (Avtomobilist Yekaterinburg), water bike accident.
- Josip Pirmajer, 74, Slovenian football player and manager.
- Jacques Saadé, 81, Lebanese-born French shipping executive, founder of CMA CGM.
- G. S. Sachdev, 83, Indian bansuri player.
- David J. Simms, 85, Irish mathematician.
- Chatri Sophonpanich, 85, Thai banker (Bangkok Bank).
- Jens Kristian Thune, 82, Norwegian lawyer and executive.
- Pavel Vranský, 97, Czech brigadier general and RAF radio operator, veteran of the siege of Tobruk, War Cross and Medal of Merit recipient.
- Harald von Boehmer, 75, German immunologist.
- Jim Washington, 66, American football player (Winnipeg Blue Bombers).

=== 25 ===
- Constance Adams, 53, American space architect and spaceport planner, colorectal cancer.
- George Cakobau Jr., Fijian chief and politician.
- Jesús Cardenal, 88, Spanish professor (University of the Basque Country) and lawyer, Attorney General (1997–2004).
- Price M. Cobbs, 89, American psychiatrist and civil rights leader, complications following heart surgery.
- Angelo Compagnoni, 96, Italian politician, Senator (1963-1972).
- Andrew Dettre, 91-92, Hungarian-born Australian sportswriter.
- Tom Dickinson, 87, Australian cricketer.
- Štefka Drolc, 94, Slovenian actress.
- Paul Gérin-Lajoie, 98, Canadian lawyer and politician, MNA (1960–1969).
- David Goldblatt, 87, South African photographer.
- Tom Goosby, 79, American football player (Cleveland Browns, Washington Redskins).
- Richard Benjamin Harrison, 77, American pawnbroker and reality television personality (Pawn Stars), complications from Parkinson's disease.
- Hiralal Jairam, 84, South African cricketer.
- Yosh Kawano, 97, American baseball clubhouse manager (Chicago Cubs), complications from Parkinson's disease.
- James M. Keck, 96, American air force lieutenant general.
- Jessica Naiga, 53, Ugandan lawyer and judge.
- Bo Nilsson, 81, Swedish composer.
- John Frederick Pickering, 78, British economist and business consultant.
- Garry Spiegle, 72, American game designer.

=== 26 ===
- Big Bill Bissonnette, 81, American jazz musician.
- Dennis Creffield, 87, British painter.
- Harold Davis, 85, Scottish football player (Rangers) and manager.
- Andrey Dementyev, 89, Russian poet.
- Henri Dirickx, 90, Belgian footballer (national team).
- René Fonck, 95, Luxembourgish Olympic sprint canoeist.
- Fedor Frešo, 71, Slovak rock and jazz bassist (The Soulmen, Prúdy), heart failure.
- José Luis Meilán Gil, 84, Spanish politician and academic.
- Bernard Ginsborg, 93, British pharmacologist and physiologist.
- Klaas Hendrikse, 69, Dutch pastor.
- Yeiji Inouye, 93, Canadian judoka.
- Dewey Johnson, 78, American free jazz trumpeter.
- Ignatios Lappas, 72, Greek Orthodox metropolitan bishop, Metropolis of Larissa and Tyrnavos (since 1994), heart failure.
- Henri Namphy, 85, Haitian military officer and politician, President (1986–1988), lung cancer.
- Sabina Ott, 62, American artist, cancer.
- Daniel Pilon, 77, Canadian actor (Dallas, Ryan's Hope, Shoot 'Em Up).
- Phil Rodgers, 80, American golfer, leukemia.
- Joseph Seroussi, 85, Sudanese-born Romanian fashion designer.
- Albert Sewell, 90, English football statistician.
- Ed Simons, 101, American conductor.
- Innocent Umezulike, 64, Nigerian jurist, chief judge of Enugu State.
- Jennifer Welles, 81, American pornographic actress (Inside Jennifer Welles).

=== 27 ===
- Jack Carroll, 94, Australian rugby union player (national team).
- David Stoughton Conant, 69, American botanist.
- Steve Ditko, 90, American comic book writer and artist (Spider-Man, Doctor Strange, Blue Beetle), heart attack.
- Raffaele Farigu, 84, Italian politician, Deputy (1987–1994).
- Johnny Guenther, 82, American ten-pin bowler.
- Demene Hall, 68, American actress (Death Bed: The Bed That Eats, The Temp, Men of Honor).
- Joe Jackson, 89, American band manager (The Jackson 5), patriarch of the Jackson family, pancreatic cancer.
- Liz Jackson, 67, Australian journalist, complications from Parkinson's disease.
- Pearce Lane, 87, American Olympic boxer.
- William McBride, 91, Australian doctor.
- Ann Nardulli, 69, American endocrinologist, cancer.
- Egil Olsen, 70, Norwegian footballer.
- Paola Paternoster, 82, Italian Olympic discus (1956, 1960) and javelin (1956) thrower.
- Corran Purdon, 97, British army major general.
- Steve Soto, 54, American punk musician (Adolescents, Agent Orange, Legal Weapon).
- Steven Hilliard Stern, 80, Canadian-born American director (The Devil and Max Devlin, Mazes and Monsters).
- Rick Turner, 66, British archaeologist, cancer.
- Vladimir Andreyevich Uspensky, 87, Russian mathematician, linguist, writer and doctor.
- Alan White, 84, Australian football player (Carlton).

=== 28 ===
- Denis Akiyama, 66, Canadian actor (Pixels, X-Men, Johnny Mnemonic), cancer.
- Martin Baddeley, 81, English Anglican priest, Archdeacon of Reigate (1996–2000).
- Sam Bass, 73, Australian politician.
- François Bluche, 92, French historian.
- Goran Bunjevčević, 45, Serbian footballer, stroke.
- Colin Butts, 58, British novelist, screenwriter and impresario, pancreatic cancer.
- Miguel Fenelon Câmara Filho, 93, Brazilian Roman Catholic prelate, Archbishop of Maceió (1976–1984) and Teresina (1984–2001).
- Carlos Campos, 88, Venezuelan politician, Governor of Anzoátegui.
- Harlan Ellison, 84, American writer (A Boy and His Dog, I Have No Mouth, and I Must Scream, "Repent, Harlequin!" Said the Ticktockman) and screenwriter.
- Jeffrey Elman, 70, American psycholinguist.
- Rob Hiaasen, 59, American journalist, shot.
- Hyon Ju-song, 56, North Korean military officer, execution by firing squad. (death announced on this date)
- Abdul Kadir, 65–66, Guyanese politician and convicted conspirator (2007 John F. Kennedy International Airport attack plot), Mayor of Linden (1994–1996).
- Mike Kilkenny, 73, Canadian baseball player (Detroit Tigers).
- Domenico Losurdo, 76, Italian Marxist philosopher and historian (Liberalism: A Counter-History).
- Russ McCubbin, 83, American actor and stuntman (High Plains Drifter, Sudden Impact, Matt Houston).
- Christine Nöstlinger, 81, Austrian writer.
- Elisha Obed, 66, Bahamian boxer, WBC light-middleweight champion (1975–1976).
- Raymond Parkinson, 96, Canadian psychiatrist and politician.
- Şarık Tara, 88, Turkish executive (Enka).
- Keith Warburton, 89, Australian footballer (Carlton).

=== 29 ===
- Ai Weiren, 86, Chinese soldier, lieutenant general of the People's Liberation Army.
- Kwesi Amissah-Arthur, 67, Ghanaian economist and politician, Governor of the Bank of Ghana (2009–2012) and Vice-President (2012–2017).
- Franz Beyer, 96, German violist and musicologist.
- Matt Cappotelli, 38, American professional wrestler (OVW) and reality show winner (WWE Tough Enough), brain cancer.
- Arvid Carlsson, 95, Swedish neuropharmacologist, Nobel Prize laureate (2000).
- Giuseppe Rocco Favale, 82, Italian Roman Catholic prelate, Bishop of Vallo della Lucania (1989–2011).
- Chantal Garrigues, 73, French actress (Soda).
- Helen Griffin, 59, British actress (Twin Town, Doctor Who) and political activist.
- Bill Hamel, 45, American composer and record producer.
- Markey James, 76, American racing driver.
- Jónas Kristjánsson, 78, Icelandic writer and newspaper editor.
- Jacques Madubost, 74, French high jumper, European champion (1966).
- María Luisa Mendoza, 88, Mexican journalist, novelist and politician.
- Liliane Montevecchi, 85, French-Italian dancer and actress (Nine, Grand Hotel, How to Lose a Guy in 10 Days), Tony winner (1982).
- Derrick O'Connor, 77, Irish actor (Lethal Weapon 2, Daredevil, Brazil), pneumonia.
- Michael Painter, 83, American landscape architect and urban designer.
- Eugene Pitt, 80, American singer (The Jive Five), complications from diabetes.
- Anthony Ray, 80, American film producer (An Unmarried Woman, Freebie and the Bean) and actor (Shadows).
- Lawrence Rondon, 68, Trinidadian footballer.
- Sir David Smith, 88, British botanist, Principal of the University of Edinburgh (1987–1994).
- Irena Szewińska, 72, Soviet-born Polish Hall of Fame sprinter, Olympic champion (1964, 1968, 1976), cancer.
- Garrie Thompson, 90, American music executive.
- Omar Vergara, 75, Argentine Olympic fencer (1968, 1972, 1976).

=== 30 ===
- Nino Assirelli, 92, Italian racing cyclist.
- Dagmar Burešová, 88, Czech lawyer and politician, Minister of Justice of Czechoslovakia, Order of Tomáš Garrigue Masaryk recipient.
- John E. Casida, 88, American entomologist and toxicologist.
- Emer Colleran, 72, Irish microbiologist and academic.
- Ioannis Giapalakis, 74, Greek Olympic sailor.
- Juraj Halenár, 35, Slovak footballer (Slovan Bratislava), suicide.
- Mike Heideman, 70, American basketball coach (Green Bay Phoenix), cancer.
- Mark Irwin, 83, New Zealand rugby union player (Otago, national team).
- Johan J. Jakobsen, 81, Norwegian politician, Chairman of the Centre Party (1979–1991), Minister of Transport (1983–1986) and Local Government (1989–1990).
- Billy Kinard, 84, American football player (Green Bay Packers, Buffalo Bills) and coach (Ole Miss Rebels).
- Timothy Murphy, 67, American poet.
- Antonella Rebuzzi, 63, Italian politician, Senator (2006–2008), heart attack.
- Fuat Sezgin, 93, Turkish Islamic science historian (Goethe University Frankfurt).
- Roy de Silva, 80, Sri Lankan director (Re Daniel Dawal Migel), heart attack.
- Smoke Dawg, 21, Canadian rapper, shot.
- Dean Webb, 81, American musician (The Dillards) and actor (The Andy Griffith Show).
- José Antonio Zaldúa, 76, Spanish footballer (F.C. Barcelona, national team, Real Valladolid).
