= Forleo =

Forleo is a surname. Notable people with this surname include:

- Francesco Forleo (1941–2018), Italian politician, former Deputy from 1987 to 1994
- Maria Clementina Forleo (born 1963), prominent Italian preliminary judge
- Marie Forleo (born 1975), American life coach, motivational speaker, author and web television host
- Romano Forleo (1933–2025), Italian politician, sexologist and gynecologist
