= Pyritz =

Pyritz may refer to:

- Pyritz, German name of Pyrzyce, a town in Pomerania, northwestern Poland
- Anja Pyritz (born 1970), German rower
- Dana Pyritz (born 1970), German rower
- Lutz Pyritz (1950–2018), German jockey and horse trainer
- Tim Pyritz (born 1993), German diver
- Pyritzans, also known as Prissani, a medieval tribe in Pomerania
- Treaty of Pyritz, 1493 between the House of Pomerania and the House of Hohenzollern
