= Wolfgang Lippert =

Wolfgang Lippert may refer to:

- Wolfgang Lippert (pilot) (1914–1941), World War II Luftwaffe flying ace
- Wolfgang Lippert (botanist) (1937–2018), German botanist
- Wolfgang Lippert (actor) (born 1952), German entertainer and actor
