= Kay de Villiers =

Jacquez Charl de Villiers (7 March 1928, Klerksdorp

== Studies and career ==
He qualified as doctor at the University of Cape Town. Following graduation and internship at the Groote Schuur Hospital, he commenced general practice in Swellendam for four years before taking up a lecturer post in Anatomy in 1957 at the newly established University of Stellenbosch Medical School.

He studied for five years in the UK, undergoing neurosurgical training at the National Hospital for Nervous Diseases, Queen Square and Atkinson Morley's Hospital, Wimbledon. During this time he was mentored by Wylie McKissock, doyen of British neurosurgery.

After his return to South Africa in 1966, he was appointed the first full-time neurosurgeon at Groote Schuur Hospital by the Faculty of Medicine at the University of Cape Town. He was promoted in 1970 to full-time head of the Department of Neurosurgery, and in 1972 to associate professor. In 1976 he became the first incumbent of the Helen and Morris Mauerberger Chair of Neurosurgery.

According to an obituary on the University of Cape Town website, “While his research interests were those of any dedicated clinician, reflecting the diversity of conditions he encountered in his daily practice, he made special contributions to the understanding of head injury in children, in work done with the young Dr Marian Jacobs.

De Villiers was the face of Neurosurgery in South Africa, pioneering new techniques learned in Zurich, Charlottesville and Paris - the latter allowing him to bring back the new technique of trans-sphenoidal pituitary surgery - and an appreciation of fine cognac which never waned and enlivened visits to his home.”

He received many awards and was a member of various scientific organisations worldwide. He is the only South African elected an Honorary President of the World Federation of Neurosurgical Societies.

He was visiting professor at various local and international academic departments. He received two honorary doctoral degrees, and was appointed a special visiting scientist by the Medical Research Council of South Africa.

== Family life ==
In December 1952 he married Christina Meta Botha in Stellenbosch, who died in 1967.

In March 1968, he married Jeanne Marié Erica du Plessis in Rondebosch, who died 20 November 2016. She was, in her own right, a highly qualified medical scientist. In her later years, she was the medical officer at the Poisons Information Centre located at the Red Cross War Memorial Children's Hospital in Rondebosch.

He had two children, Charl Christian de Villiers and Elfrida Susan de Villiers.

== Other research, books and interests ==
Prof de Villiers was very interested in the Anglo-Boer War and did wide-ranging research into medicine during the war. His two volumes on the medical history of the war is entitled Healers, Helpers and Hospitals (published by Protea Boekhuis, 2009). The work was honoured by the University of Cape Town with the prestigious 2011 UCT Book Award.

In 2011, his book, Dwarstrekkers, Dwepers en Dokters – Merkwaardige vertellings uit die Anglo-Boereoorlog (English: "Obstructionists, fanatics and doctors – intriguing tales from the Anglo-Boer War") was published. He co-authored Yeoman of the Karoo and was a founder of the Cape Medical Museum.
