= Romano Forleo =

Italian politician (1933–2025)

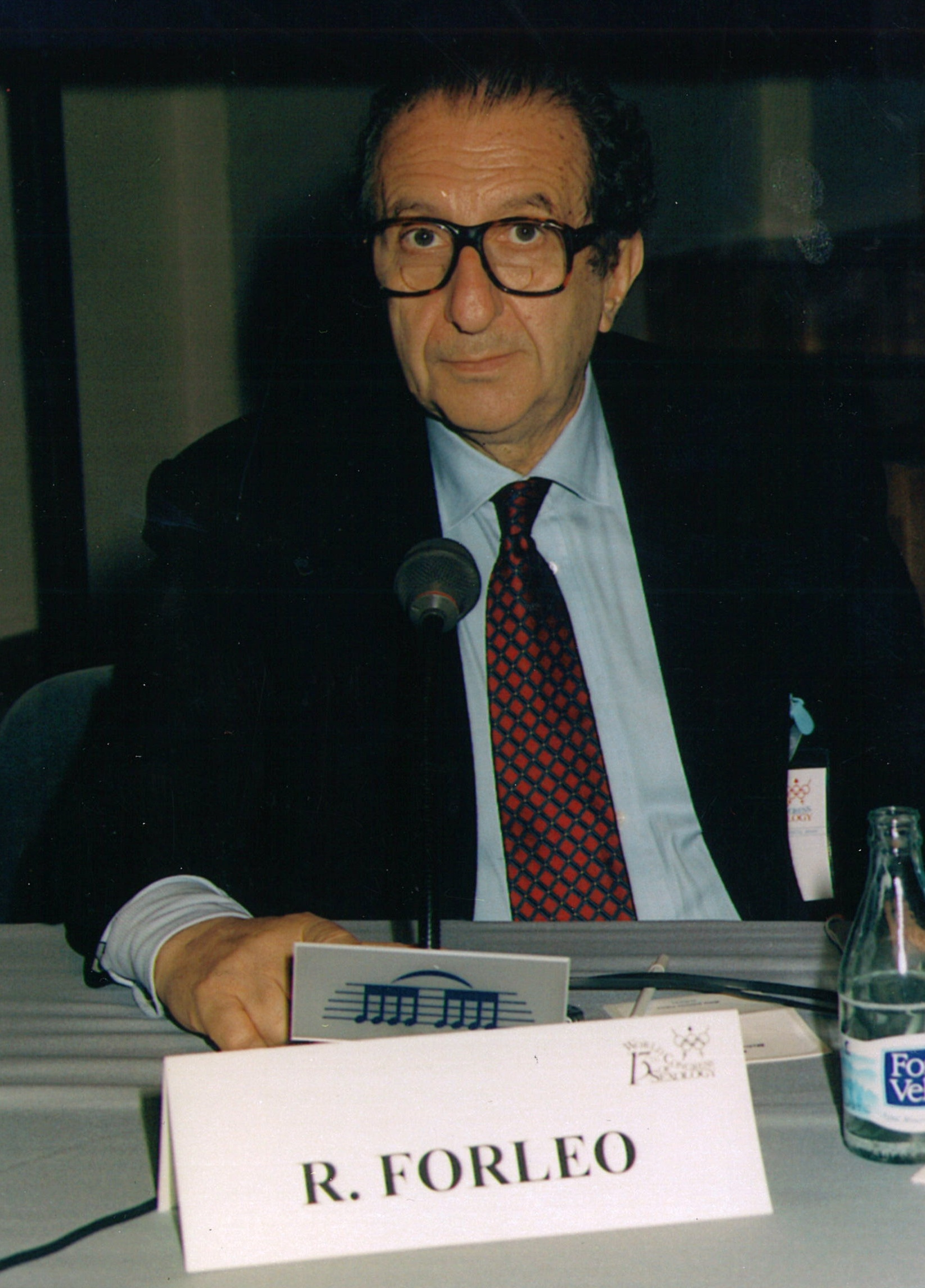

Senator of the Italian Republic
- In office 25 November 1993 – 14 April 1994

Personal details
- Born: 12 November 1933 Bologna, Italy
- Died: 1 August 2025 (aged 91) Rome, Italy
- Education: University of Florence

Romano Forleo (12 November 1933 – 1 August 2025) was an Italian gynecologist, sexologist, politician and writer.

== Life and career ==
Forleo was born in Bologna on 12 November 1933. After graduating with honors in Medicine and Surgery at the University of Florence in 1958, he specialized first in Obstetrics and Gynecology in 1962 and then in Endocrinology and Metabolic Diseases in 1964.

He co-founded, and was the first president of the World Association for Sexology in 1978. He also created the Division of Obstetrics and Gynecology of the San Giovanni Calibita Fatebenefratelli Hospital in Rome, and directed the division for 25 years.

From 25 November 1993 to 14 April 1994, he was a Senator with Christian Democracy during the XI Legislature of the Italian Republic.

Forleo died in Rome on 1 August 2025, at the age of 91.
