= Yakov Brand =

Russian cardiac surgeon and television presenter

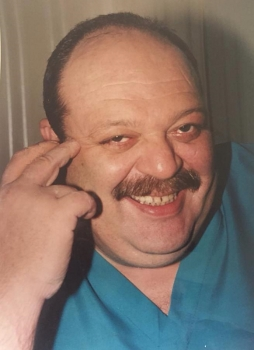
- Born: Yakov Beniaminovich Brand; May 20, 1955; Odessa, Ukrainian SSR, Soviet Union
- Died: June 12, 2018 (aged 63); Moscow, Russia
- Occupation: Cardiac surgeon
- Children: 3: Olga Brand, Dr. Pavel Brand, Alexander Brand; only sister: Margarita Anshina (Brand), leading IVF specialist in RF;

Yakov Beniaminovich Brand (Russian: Я́ков Бениами́нович Бранд, first name often given as Jacob; May 20, 1955 – June 12, 2018) was a Russian cardiac surgeon and television presenter.

He was born on May 20, 1955, in Odessa to a Jewish family. He graduated from the Odessa State Medical Institute in 1979. Since 1981 he lived and worked in Moscow.

From 1999 to 2010 he was the host of the TV program Without Рrescription on the channel NTV. In 2001–2003 he was leading the program on drug addiction Coma on NTV, paired with musician Sergei Galanin.

Brand was hospitalized on May 30, 2018, and died on June 12, 2018. cause is unknown He was 63.

== Awards ==
- State Prize of the Russian Federation (2001)
- Moscow Medical Award (2004)
- Honored Doctor of the Russian Federation (2005)
