= Henry Sharratt =

English rugby league footballer (1936–2018)

Personal information
- Born: 1936 Wakefield district, England
- Died: 8 June 2018 (aged 82) Wakefield, England

Playing information
- Height: 6 ft 4 in (1.93 m)
- Position: Wing, Centre, Prop, Second-row
Club
Years	Team	Pld	T	G	FG	P
1958	Wakefield Trinity	3	2	0	0	6
1959–60/61	Featherstone Rovers	4	0	0	0	0
1962/63	Bradford Northern	14
	Dewsbury
1965	Batley	8	1	0	0	3
	Total	29	3	0	0	9

Henry Sharratt (1936 – June 8, 2018) was an English professional rugby league footballer who played in the 1950s and 1960s. He played at representative level for England (Juniors), and Yorkshire (Juniors), and at club level for Stanley Rangers ARLFC, Wakefield Trinity, Featherstone Rovers, Bradford Northern, Dewsbury and Batley as a wing, centre, prop or second-row.

== Background ==
Henry Sharratt's birth was registered in Wakefield district, West Riding of Yorkshire, England.

He worked at Newmarket Silkstone Colliery, Methley, Leeds. A broken leg in April 1958 curtailed his progress in the rugby league. He lived in Outwood, Wakefield and was the director of Eastmoor Dragons A.R.L.F.C. (in Eastmoor, Wakefield) from 25 August 1991 to 30 August 1999. He died after a long illness aged 82 in Wakefield, West Yorkshire, England.

== Playing career ==
=== Club career ===
Henry Sharratt played for England (Juniors) against France (Juniors) at Central Park, Wigan on Saturday 9 April 1955, where he made his début for Wakefield Trinity, playing at second-row alongside Reg Parker). Following an injury to a Wakefield Trinity wing, he was moved to the wing and scored a try, in the 48-13 victory over Doncaster at Belle Vue, Wakefield on Saturday 29 March 1958. Sharratt's interchange of passes in this match also helped Neil Fox to score 6-tries. With 6-goals, Fox set Wakefield Trinity's then 'most points in a match' record with 30-points. Sharratt played his second match, and scored a try in the 61-12 victory over Batley at Belle Vue, Wakefield on Wednesday 2 April 1958. Unfortunately, he broke his leg in this match, and he was sidelined for 6-months, but following an injury to Albert Firth, he returned to the first team and played second-row (alongside second-row Don Vines) in the 29-8 victory over Dewsbury at Belle Vue, Wakefield.

During early October 1958, he played as a forward, regularly scoring tries in Wakefield Trinity's A-Team during the 1958–59 season. He played his last first-team match for Wakefield Trinity during the 1958–59 season. Despite protestations by Wakefield Trinity's coach; Ken Traill, he was transferred from Wakefield Trinity to Featherstone Rovers, he made his début for Featherstone Rovers on Monday 17 August 1959. All his matches for Featherstone Rovers were played as a second-row. He played regularly in Featherstone Rovers' A-Team, and he played his last match for Featherstone Rovers during the 1960–61 season. He was transferred from Featherstone Rovers to Bradford Northern. He was transferred from Bradford Northern to Dewsbury, and then, was transferred from Dewsbury to Batley. He made his début for Batley in the 9-6 victory over Doncaster at Mount Pleasant, Batley on Tuesday 24 August 1965. He scored his only try for Batley in the defeat by Keighley at Mount Pleasant, Batley on Saturday 25 September 1965. All his matches for Batley were played as a second-row, and he played his last match for Batley in the 24-7 defeat by York at Clarence Street, York on Saturday 16 October 1965.
