= César Alvarenga =

Paraguayan politician (??–2018)

César Alvarenga (died June 24, 2018) was a Paraguayan politician who served as the governor of San Pedro Department from 1998 until 1999. He also served as the mayor of Choré and a Choré District councilor.

Alvarenga, who suffered from health problems, died of a heart attack at his home in Choré, Paraguay, on June 24, 2018.
