= Basil Ramsey =

British music publisher and editor

Basil Ramsey (26 April 1929 – 12 June 2018), was an English music publisher, journalist, editor and organist.

Ramsey was born in Chelmsford and grew up in London. He joined the music publisher Novello and Co in 1949, becoming Director of Publications in 1963. While there he worked with composers including Peter Dickinson, Geoffrey Bush, John Joubert, Kenneth Leighton, and John McCabe. In 1974 he set up his own publishing business (Basil Ramsey/Banks Music Publications) with his friend, the composer Bernard Herrmann – though Herrmann unfortunately died the following year. Ramsey published many pieces by the musical medium Rosemary Brown. He also became the publisher of the Maltese composer Charles Camilleri.

He was the editor of and contributor to various publications, including Organists’ Review (1972–84), Music & Musicians (1989–90), and The Musical Times (1990–92), and was the founding editor of Choir and Organ in 1993. Ramsey suffered a stroke three years later, but continued editing for another decade from his wheelchair. And in 1999, with Keith Bramich, he founded the online music magazine Music & Vision, where he continued working until 2006.

Ramsey was also a church organist in London, at St Luke’s, Old Street, and St Giles, Cripplegate, in London. He arranged the carol From Heaven Winging, which is still performed.

He married his wife Violet Simpson in 1952 and there were two daughters and a son. She died in 1996. Basil Ramsey died in North Yorkshire on 13 June 2018, aged eighty-nine, following a long illness.
