= Raffaele Farigu =

Italian politician (1934–2018)

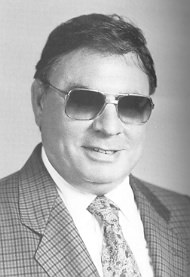
Raffaele Farigu

Raffaele Farigu (9 June 1934 – 27 June 2018) was an Italian politician who served as a Deputy from 1987 to 1994.
