= Geoff Mason =

Australian rules footballer

Personal information
- Full name: Geoffrey Reginald Mason
- Born: 6 May 1930
- Died: 5 June 2018 (aged 88); Benalla, Victoria, Australia
- Original team: Malvern Amateurs
- Height: 182 cm (6 ft 0 in)
- Weight: 78 kg (172 lb)

Playing career^{1}
Years	Club	Games (Goals)
1951	Melbourne	4 (0)
- ^{1} Playing statistics correct to the end of 1951.

Geoffrey Reginald Mason (6 May 1930 – 5 June 2018) was an Australian rules footballer who played with Melbourne in the Victorian Football League (VFL).
