= Bill Quimby =

American writer

William Robert Quimby (September 30, 1936 – June 20, 2018) was an American author, columnist, editor and publisher who specialized in subjects related to big game hunting for more than four decades.

== Biography ==
William Robert Quimby was born on 30 September 1936 in Tucson, Arizona as the first child of Isaac William Quimby and Helen Dixon Quimby. Quimby attended public schools in Yuma, Arizona, and obtained a degree in Marketing from the University of Arizona. He worked in the advertising and public relations fields for eleven years before pursuing a second career in journalism and publishing. He was married to Jean Potts until his death, with whom he had a daughter, Stephanie, and two grandchildren Natalie and Logan.

Bill and Jean Quimby divided their year between their home in Tucson and a cabin near the New Mexico border in eastern Arizona's high country.

== Writing career ==
After closing the Arizona Outdoor News, the monthly hunting and fishing newspaper he founded four years earlier, Quimby joined the Tucson Daily Citizen (a Gannett Company newspaper) as its outdoor editor in 1967. The hundreds of feature articles and nearly 3,000 twice-weekly columns he wrote over the next 27 years for the Citizen, as well as his articles in Safari magazine and various hunting and shooting magazines, made him one of the southwest's best-known outdoor writers. His series on overgrazing by cattle in Arizona's Kofa and Cabeza Prieta National Wildlife Refuges resulted in his being named Arizona Conservation Communicator of the Year by then-Governor Jack Williams in 1973. Other award-winning investigative series included his exposés of the increasing loss of access to Arizona's public lands and the looting of ancient southwestern Indian burial sites by commercial pothunters. He retired from the Citizen in 1994. The Citizen, Arizona's oldest newspaper at the time, ceased publication in 2009.

Beginning in 1983, Quimby was also director of publications for Safari Club International (SCI), a worldwide organization of big game hunters with headquarters in Tucson. With a staff of editors and artists, he edited and published Safari magazine and the SCI Record Books of Trophy Animals, and conceived and launched Safari Times and Safari Times Africa newspapers. For three years after he retired in 1999, Bill and Jean Quimby co-edited “Safari Cub,” a bimonthly magazine for the club's young members. He moderated SCI's longest-running seminar, “Your First African Safari,” at the club's annual conventions in Nevada from 1989 to 2012.

Quimby successfully hunted more than 60 types of big game animals in twelve countries on six continents, including all ten species indigenous to Arizona. He edited, wrote or co-authored more than two dozen published books (including the memoirs he ghostwrote in 2007 and 2011 for two well-known international hunters).

== Writings and editings ==
- McElroy Hunts Asia, by C.J. McElroy, Bill Quimby editor, Sincere Press (1989) No ISBN
- McElroy Hunts Dangerous Game, by C.J. McElroy, Bill Quimby editor, Trophy Room Books (2000) ISBN 1-882458-28-1
- McElroy Hunts Mountain Game, by C.J. McElroy, Bill Quimby editor, Trophy Room Books (2001) ISBN 1-882458-29-X
- McElroy Hunts The Antelope Of Africa and Antlered Game, by C.J. McElroy, Bill Quimby editor, Trophy Room Books (2002) ISBN 1-882458-33-8
- Yoshi, The Life And Travels Of An International Big Game Hunter, by Watson Yoshimoto with Bill Quimby, Safari Press (2003) ISBN 1-57157-175-2
- The Heck With It I’m Going Hunting, by Arnold Alward with Bill Quimby, Safari Press (2003)ISBN 1-57157-176-0
- Royal Quest, The Hunting Saga Of H.I.H. Prince Abdorreza Of Iran, by Bill Quimby, Safari Press (2004) ISBN 1-57157-187-6
- Wind In My Face, The Shikars And Safaris Of A Cazador de Mexico, by Hubert Thummler with Bill Quimby, Safari Press (2006) ISBN 1-57157-234-1
- Memories from Greer, Tales Told Of a Unique Arizona Village, Bill Quimby and Nadine Stanley editors, Greer Library Friends (2007).
- Around The World and Then Some, by David Hanlin with Bill Quimby, Safari Press (2009) ISBN 1-57157-341-0
- Sixty Years A Hunter, by Bill Quimby, Safari Press, (2010) ISBN 1-57157-340-2
- Divine Assistance, The Best And The Last Of The Golden Age of International Big Game Hunting", by Jimmie Rosenbruch with Bill Quimby and David Cabela. Safari Press (2014)
- Hunting In Our Genes by Steve Isaacs, Bill Quimby editor. Raptor Ridge Ranch Australia (2014) ISBN 978-0-646-92260-7
- Penfold. Life And Times Of A Professional Hunting Guide Down Under, by Bob Penfold. Edited by Bill Quimby. Privately published. (2015).

== Safari Club International publications ==
- SCI Record Books Of Trophy Animals, multiple volumes annually, (1985–1999) Bill Quimby, editor, ISBN 1-891588-02-8
- "SCI World Bowhunting Record Book", Edition One (1996) Bill Quimby, director of publications.
- Safari (1983–1999) bimonthly magazine. Bill Quimby, editor
- Deer (1984) Bill Quimby, editor
- Safari Africa (1985) Bill Quimby, editor
- North of the '48 (1986) Bill Quimby, editor
- Safaris Revisited, Best Of Safari Magazine of the 1970s, Bill Quimby and Sally Antrobus, editors, (1991) [ISBN unspecified]
- Safaris Revisited, Best of Safari Magazine of the 1980s, Bill Quimby and Sally Antrobus, editors, (1992) [ISBN unspecified]
- "Safari Times" monthly newspaper. (1990–1999) Bill Quimby director, Doug Fulton and Guy Sagi, editors.
- "Safari Times Africa" monthly newspaper. (1996–1999) Bill Quimby director, Pierre van der Walt, editor.
- "Safari Cub" (1999–2001) bimonthly magazine. Bill and Jean Quimby, editors
- "The History of SCI", by Bill Quimby. (2005) ISBN 1-891588-00-1

== Awards ==
- Arizona Conservation Communicator of the Year, Arizona Wildlife Federation, 1973
- Peter Hathaway Capstick International Literary Award, Fiona Claire Capstick, 2003.
- Arizona Outdoor Hall of Fame, inducted 2007, Wildlife For Tomorrow Foundation.
