= Tom Dickinson (cricketer) =

Australian cricketer

Personal information
- Full name: Thomas Eastwood Dickinson
- Born: 11 January 1931; Parramatta, Sydney, New South Wales, Australia
- Died: 25 June 2018 (aged 87); Nottingham, England
- Batting: Left-handed
- Bowling: Right-arm fast-medium
- Role: Bowler

Domestic team information
- Years: Team
- 1950–51: Lancashire
- 1957: Somerset
- First-class debut: 16 August 1950 Lancashire v Hampshire
- Last First-class: 27 August 1957 Somerset v Yorkshire

Career statistics
Competition	First-class
Matches	9
Runs scored	21
Batting average	3.50
100s/50s	–/–
Top score	9
Balls bowled	1072
Wickets	20
Bowling average	20.95
5 wickets in innings	1
10 wickets in match	–
Best bowling	5/36
Catches/stumpings	5/–
- Source: CricketArchive, 15 November 2010

Thomas Eastwood Dickinson (11 January 1931 – 25 June 2018) was an Australian-born first-class cricket player for Lancashire in 1950 and 1951 and for Somerset in 1957. But he decided against a full-time cricket career and became a schoolmaster. He was born in Parramatta, Sydney, Australia.

== Life and career ==
Though born in Australia, Dickinson was educated in England at Blackburn Grammar School and Manchester University, where he gained a BSc in Maths. A right-arm fast-medium bowler and a left-handed tail-end batsman, he played Lancashire League cricket for East Lancashire from the age of 15 and made his first-class debut for Lancashire as a 19-year-old in 1950, playing as an amateur. Such was the dominance of Lancashire's spin attack of Roy Tattersall, Bob Berry, Malcolm Hilton and Peter Greenwood that Dickinson bowled only 56 overs in his four matches for the side in 1950 and 1951, never taking more than one wicket in any innings. In the mid-1950s, he turned out for The Army in non-first-class matches.

He was appointed Head of Maths at Queen's College, Taunton. During the summer holidays in August 1957 he played in five consecutive matches for Somerset. In his first match, against Glamorgan, he took five wickets for 36 in the first innings, sharing all 10 wickets in the innings with Bryan Lobb, who took five for 63. In the following match, he was again Somerset's most successful bowler against a full-strength Surrey side heading for its sixth consecutive County Championship: he took four for 80, though Surrey won the match. But after taking 17 wickets at an average of less than 20 runs per wicket, he did not appear in first-class matches again, though he played for Somerset's second eleven in Minor Counties matches in the school holidays in 1958.

Dickinson's batting was negligible, and in nine first-class matches he did not ever reach double figures. The Somerset historian David Foot, however, remembered his batting style: "More than once I saw him switch from left to right hand in the middle of an over – not to attempt the contentious reverse sweep but to deceive the fielders and show he could play the cover drive on both sides," he wrote. "They used to say he could also bowl with either hand."

He taught at Queen's College for 29 years before retiring to Nottinghamshire.
