= M. Azizur Rahman =

Azizur Rahman
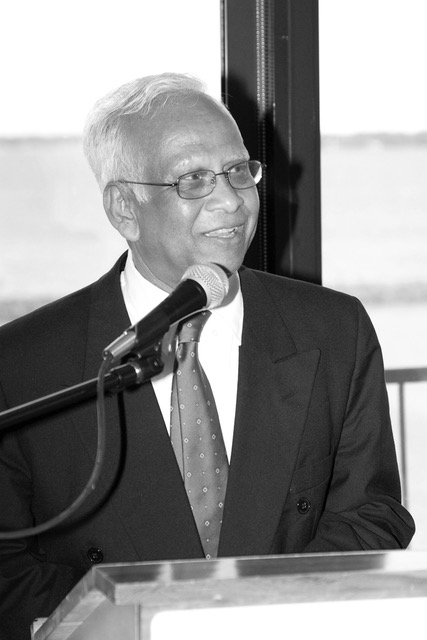
- Dr. Azizur Rahman speaking in Canada
- Born: January 9, 1941; Santahar, Bogra, Bangladesh
- Died: June 16, 2018 (aged 77); St. Johns, Newfoundland, Canada
- Other name: "Mr. IPM"
- Occupations: Inventor, Professor
- Years active: 1966 - 2018
- Known for: IPM Hybrid Motors

Md. Azizur Rahman (9 January 1941 – 16 June 2018), also known as Aziz, was a Bangladeshi-born inventor of modern energy-efficient electric motors that span multiple industry applications, based in Canada. He was an electrical engineer, professor, researcher and scientist. He is internationally recognized as one of the founding innovators of modern power engineering and a pioneer in the development and application of interior permanent magnet motors and associated drive technology-used in the world's first mass-produced hybrid vehicle, the Toyota Prius. Since launching the Prius in 1997, Toyota surpassed global sales of 15 million hybrid vehicles in 2020, all of which use Dr. Azizur Rahman's IPM motor drive. His research contributions were broad and adopted in a wide range of electric motor applications ranging from vacuum cleaners, air conditioners, elevators to aircraft.

Born in Santahar, East Bengal (now Santahar, Bogra, Bangladesh) on 9 January 1941, Azizue Rahman emigrated to Canada as a Commonwealth Scholar in the early 1960s to attend the University of Toronto, where he studied electrical engineering. While pursuing his PhD at Carleton University's power laboratory in 1966, Rahman originated the concept of an IPM motor when he discovered that a hysteresis motor is a temporarily magnetized permanent magnet synchronous machine. From them on, he has been solving problems involved in the design, manufacture and practical application of permanent magnet motors. In 1982, he successfully built the first self-start, high power rating (45 kW), high efficiency (>97%) and high power factor (>95%) IPM synchronous motor.

Professor Azizur Rahman taught at the Faculty of Engineering and Applied Science at Memorial University from 1976 until his death on 16 June 2018. He was a frequent visiting professor and research consultant collaborating on a wide range of motor applications to major industrial and automotive companies. He volunteered significant portion of his time to the Institute of Electrical and Electronics Engineers (IEEE) and was recognized for his technical contributions by all IEEE power and energy societies. He published 757 papers including 196 IEEE transactions papers, 11 patents and two books. In 2011, He co-authored the first book, entitled "An Introduction to Wavelet Modulated Inverters". Dr. Azizur Rahman was inducted as a Fellow of the Royal Society of Canada and was granted Life Fellow by the IEEE.

Visiting professor and senior research fellow
Universities	Industries
Imperial College in London	Toyota
Technical University of Eindhoven	General Electric
University of Manitoba	General Motors
University of Toronto	Bosche Motors
Nanyang Technological University	Philips Research
Tokyo Institute of Technology	Sumitomo Electric
University of Hong Kong	Bayerische Motoren Werke AG
Tokyo University of Science	Daimler AG
University of Malaysia	Ontario Hydro

== Medals and awards with citations ==
Azizur Rahman had a highly decorated career and won numerous international professional awards in the field of electric motors and machines.

2015, Fellow of the Royal Society of Canada (FRSC) Award, November 2015

M. A. Azizur Rahman is an internationally-recognized scholar for his contributions to the development and promotion of the Interior Permanent Magnet (IPM) technology. Highly efficient IPM motors and generators have proven to be critical for the development of hybrid electric vehicles. Azizur was a Visiting Professor at many world class Universities. He has received numerous awards such as the Gold Medal award for seminal contributions to engineering and the world.

2012, Prince Albert II Medal

For contributions on Ecological Vehicles and Renewable Energies, EVER, Monaco March 2012

2010, The Institution of Bangladesh Engineers (IEB) Gold Medal

Outstanding Contributions to the Profession and the Nation

2009, Canadian Academy of Engineering Fellow Award

For outstanding contributions to the design, development, analysis, controls and application of interior permanent magnet (IPM) synchronous motors and associated drive systems. Dr. Rahman has been repeatedly honored by his peers for his technical contributions and leadership in promoting IPM technology worldwide, and he is the only person to receive highest awards from four IEEE societies. His IPM design innovations have had significant economic and environmental benefits worldwide, including reducing costs to consumers and increasing energy efficiency of air conditioning systems, and he is the father of modern energy-efficient hybrid electric vehicles.

2008, A.D. Dunton Distinguished Alumni Award of Carleton University

Outstanding Contributions to the Field of Power Engineering

2008, IEEE Power and Energy Society (PES) Distinguished Service Award

2007, IEEE Dr. Ing Eugene Mittelmann Outstanding Award from Industrial Electronics Society

Award for his lifelong outstanding contributions to interior permanent motor (IPM) drive systems and associated delta, pulsewidth and wavelet modulated Inverter Systems

2005, Khwarizmi International Award, 2005 (UNESCO Sponsored Award)

For his achievements in Science for the Khwarizmi International Prize

2004, IEEE William E. Newell Power Electronics Award

For Outstanding Contributions in Power Electronics

2004, IEEE IAS Distinguished Lecturer Award, January 2004 – 2005

2003, IEEE Cyril Veinott Electromechanical Energy Conversion Award from PES

For Contributions to the Design and Analysis of Hysteresis and Permanent Magnet Motors

2000, IEEE Third Millennium Medal

For Outstanding Achievement and Contributions

1998, Fellow, Engineering Institute of Canada

In Recognition of his Excellence in Engineering and for services re-tendered to the Profession and to Society

1996, IEEE Canada Outstanding Engineering Education (Ham) Medal

For life-long contributions in Electric Machines and Power Electronics Education

1994, Association of Professional Engineers & Geoscientists of Newfoundland Merit Award, 1994

In Recognition of having made Outstanding Contributions to the Engineering Profession and the Community

1993, University Research Professorship, Memorial University of Newfoundland, 1993

In Recognition of career in Scholarly Research

1993, Outstanding Achievement Award for North American of Bangladesh Origin, 1993

For Outstanding contributions in Engineering 1992, IEEE Industry Applications Society (IAS) Outstanding Achievement Award, 1992 With the following citation: In recognition of outstanding contributions to the Applications of Electricity to Industry

1988, IEEE Fellow Award,

For Contributions to the design and analysis of Hysteresis and Permanent Magnet Motors

1980, IEEE Outstanding Counselor's Award, 1980

For leadership for MUN IEEE students

1978, General Electric Centennial Award for Invention Disclosures, December 1978

For hysteresis permanent magnet motors

Professional distinctions

- Fellow of the Royal Society of Canada (FRSC), 2015– •
- Life Fellow, Institute of Electrical and Electronics Engineers (IEEE), 2007–
- Fellow, Institute of Electrical and Electronics Engineers (IEEE), 1988–
- Fellow, Institution of Engineering and Technology (IET), London, England, 1989–
- Fellow, Institution of Engineers, Bangladesh, F1467, 1983
- Life Fellow, Institution of Engineers, Bangladesh, 1989–
- Fellow, Engineering Institute of Canada, 1998–
- Fellow, Canadian Academy of Engineering, 2009

Professional registrations

- Registered Professional Engineer, Province of Newfoundland and Labrador, 1976–
- Registered Professional Engineer, Province of Ontario, 1968–
- Registered Professional Engineer, Province of Manitoba, 1975–76
- Chartered Engineer, UK, 1990–

Editorial board membership and reviewership

- Editor, IEEE Transactions on Energy Conversion, 2007–2011
- Guest editor, Special Section on Modern PM Drives, IEEE Transactions on Industrial Electronics, 1994–95
- Co-editor (North America), Electro-technology in Industry: International Developments in the Use of Electrical Energy, Century Publisher, 1991
- Associate editor, IEEE Transactions on Power Electronics, 1997–2002, 2004–2007
- Member, editorial board, IEEE Transactions on Magnetics, 1996–1997
- Member, editorial board, Electric Power Components and Systems Journal, Hemisphere Publishing, 1990–2008
- Member, editorial board, Journal of Electrical Systems, 2006–
- Member, editorial board, International Journal of Industrial Electronics and Drives, 2007–
- Chair, Committee on Electric Machines Transaction Paper Reviews IEEE Industry Applications Society, 1989–91
- Reviews: IEEE Transactions on Energy Conversion, IEEE Transactions on Power Delivery, IEEE Transactions on Power Systems, IEEE Transactions on Magnetics, IEEE Transactions on Industry Applications, IEEE Transactions on Electromagnetic Compatibility, IEEE Transactions on Power Electronics, IEEE Transactions on Industrial Electronics, IEEE Transactions on Signal Processing, IEEE Transactions on Fuzzy Logics, IEEE Transactions on Neural Networks, International Journal of 8 Energy Systems, Electric Machines and Power Systems, and Journal of King Saud University (Engineering Sciences)
