= Cape Medical Museum =

- Established: 24 September 1981
- Location: Green Point, South Africa
- Coordinates: 33.90716°S 18.41475°E
- Type: Provincial Museum
- Owner: Western Cape Government

The Cape Medical Museum is situated in the Old City Hospital Complex in Green Point, Cape Town, South Africa. Its exhibitions center around the medical history of the Cape and includes exhibitions on dentistry, hospital care, traditional African medicine and pharmaceutical developments. It was founded by a group of volunteers in the 1980s led by Prof J C De Villiers. Since its conception it was proclaimed as a Provincial Museum of the government of the Western Cape province.

== History ==
South African history and its encounters with Europe, was arguably for medical reasons. As the Dutch East India Company or VOC attempted to establish trade routes to the East via the south of Africa it became essential to establish a halfway station at the Cape of Good Hope due to malnutrition diseases such as scurvy. The indigenous cattle herders along with the rich resources of fauna and flora at the Cape had the potential to provide essential nutrients to the VOC fleets and in 1652 Jan van Riebeeck was commissioned to establish a 'halfway' station at the Cape.

== Proclamation ==
The Cape Medical Museum was proclaimed as a Provincial Museum of the Western Cape government on 24 September 1981 in proclamation 299 of the Government Gazette. The proclamation of provincial museums in the Western Cape province of South Africa is governed by legislation known as the Museum Ordinance 8 of 1975.

== Exhibitions ==
The museum features several turn-of-the-century medical exhibitions, featuring a Doctor's Consulting Room, Dentist Room, Hospital Ward and Operating Theater.

Furthermore, the museum focuses on the unique contribution of the indigenous people of the Western Cape in compiling the pharmaceutical knowledge of Doctors, and later Pharmacist, at the Cape Colony.

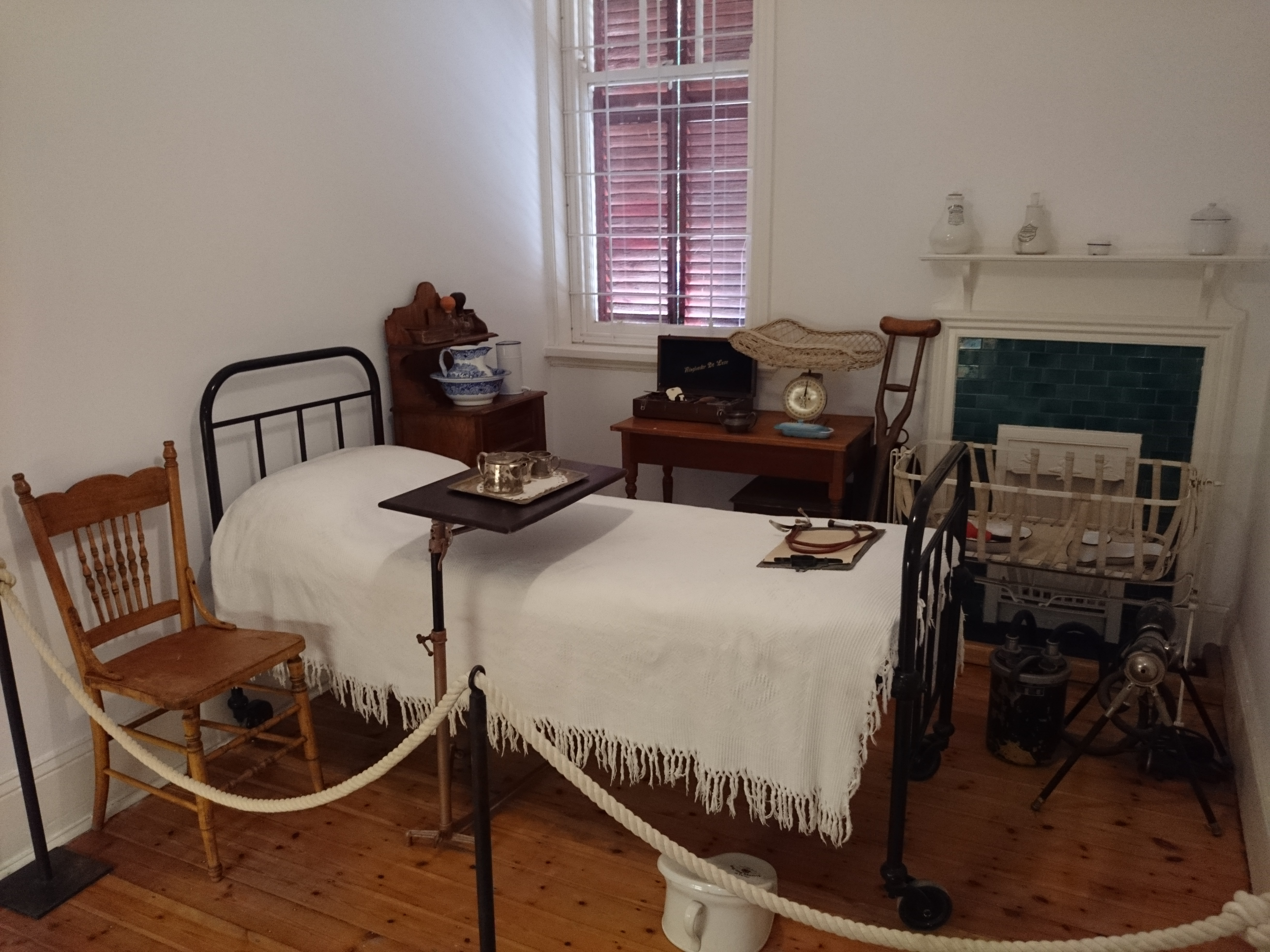
Hospital ward Cape Medical Museum

In addition to its exhibitions, the museum has an activity room that allows children and school learners to learn about the human body, see touch and feel plastic models and watch information videos on the human immune system and HIV/AIDS.

=== The Doctor's Consulting Room ===
The Doctor's consulting room is furnished with items dating from the late 19th and early 20th centuries.

=== Dispensary Room ===
The Dispensary room is a typical example of what could be found in a Cape Dispensary in the days of 1910. Pharmacy was only recognized as a profession in 1885 with the establishment of the South African Pharmaceutical Association.

=== Disease Room ===
Diseases have played a role in shaping the history of the world. It has defeated armies, paralyzed trade, thereby influencing economies and changing the social conditions of nations. The disease and history exhibition commemorates the most prominent outbreaks of diseases throughout history which includes scurvy, leprosy, Spanish Influenza and the most recent HIV/AIDS.

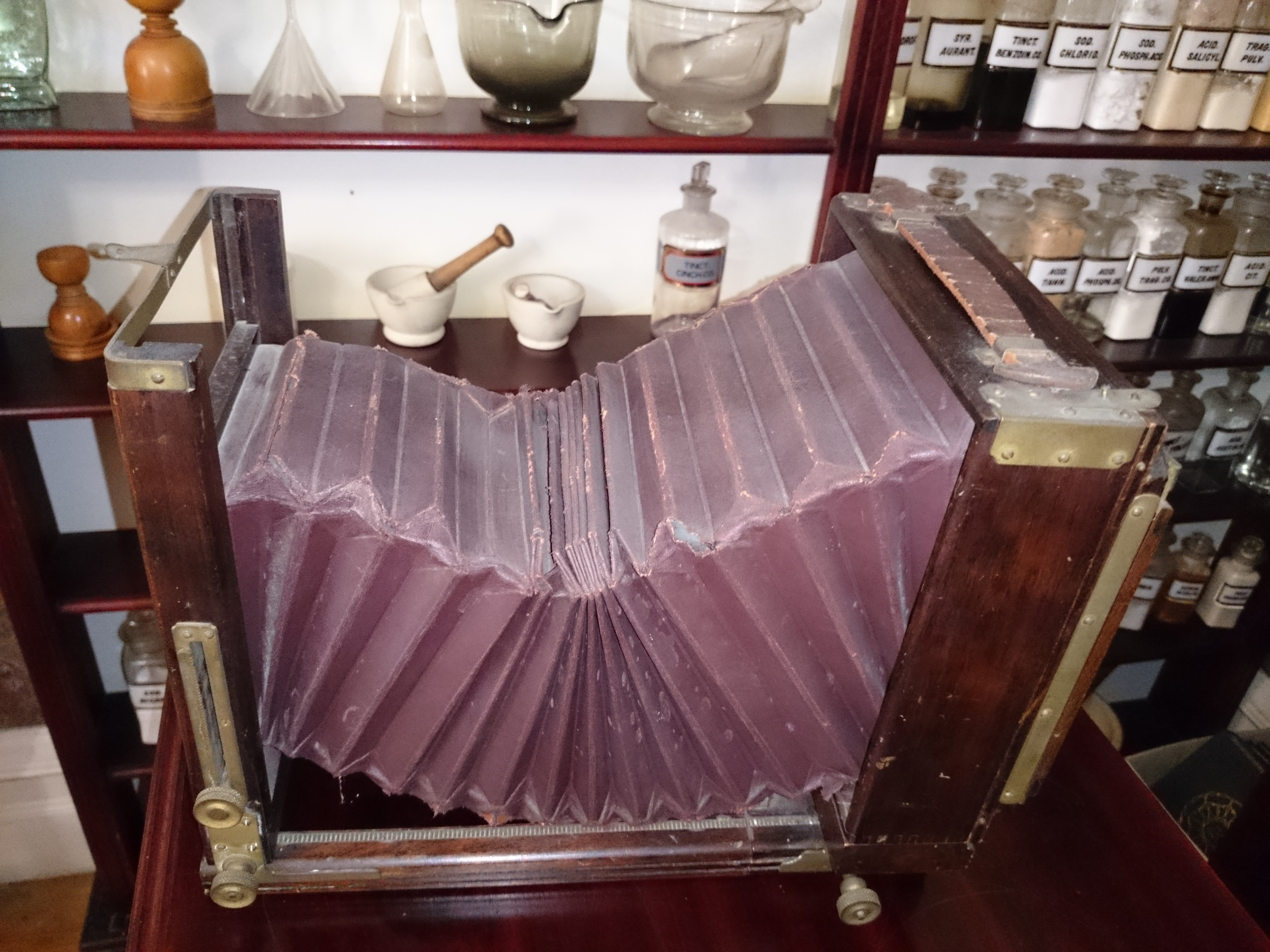
X-ray device (side view) cape medical museum

=== Operating Theatre ===
In prehistoric times, operations were performed as magical remedies for the pain and sickness. A more scientific approach evolved as knowledge of the human anatomy improved. Further progress was made by the great anatomists of the Renaissance such as Vesalius. During the war of the subsequent centuries surgical skills developed in treating the wounded. John Hunter (1728 - 1793)

=== The Hospital Ward ===
The Hospital Ward exhibition portrays a partial view of a typical hospital recovery ward from the early 20th century. It includes contemporary nursing and midwifery equipment.

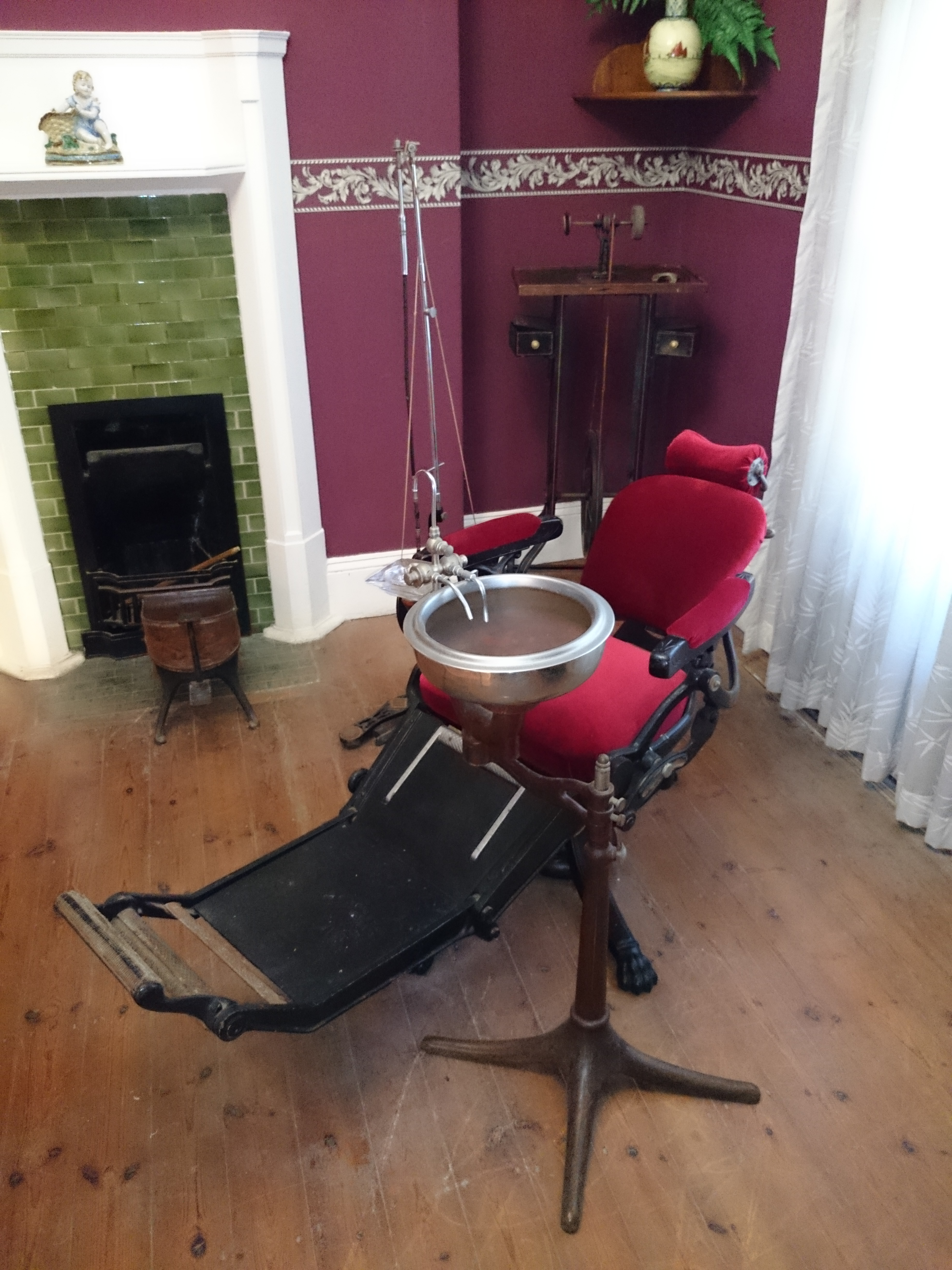
Dentistry room operation chair

== Educational programmes ==
The museum's educational programmes are aligned to the National School Curriculum of South Africa, and specifically focuses on the "History of Medicine" and medicinal plants. The museum offers guided tours through its exhibition spaces. For additional information see photo gallery above.

== Location ==
The Cape Medical Museum is situated in the Old City Hospital Complex, Green Point (Cape Town), South Africa.
