= Sam Moore (publisher) =

Lebanese-born American publisher

- Born: Salim Ziady; October 25, 1929; Beirut, Lebanon
- Died: June 1, 2018 (aged 88)
- Education: Columbia International University; University of South Carolina
- Occupation: Publisher

Sam Moore, born Salim Ziady, (October 25, 1929 – June 1, 2018) was a Lebanese-born American publisher. He was the chief executive officer of Thomas Nelson from 1969 to 2005.

== Early life ==
Moore was born on October 25, 1929, in Beirut, Lebanon. Moore converted to Christianity after his friend Charlie was killed by his girlfriend for dating other girls. He emigrated to the United States in the 1950s to attend Columbia International University, followed by the University of South Carolina.

== Career ==
After college, Moore worked as a door-to-door salesman where he developed his personal credo for dealing with rejection "When you hear no you reverse the letters and you go on." Moore began his career in 1958 in Nashville as the founder of the National Book Publishers. In 1961, with the help of Jack C. Massey, Moore founded Royal Publishing. He merged it with Thomas Nelson in the 1960s.

Moore served as the chief executive officer of Thomas Nelson from 1969 to 2005. In 1983, he decided to publish the New King James Version, and it became a best-seller. Other best-selling authors picked by Moore included John C. Maxwell, Zig Ziglar and Jerry Falwell, the founder of Liberty University, which Moore supported financially.

== Personal life and death ==
Moore had a wife, Peggy, and three children.

Moore died on June 1, 2018, at 88.
