= Michael Lockwood (philosopher) =

Michael John Lockwood (1944 – 24 June 2018) was a British philosopher.

== Life ==
Lockwood studied philosophy and psychology at Exeter College, Oxford, and did his doctorate at that university under the supervision of A. J. Ayer. For five years he was assistant professor in philosophy at New York University, and was subsequently employed as a systems analyst for the New York and American Stock Exchanges.

Lockwood was emeritus Fellow of Green Templeton College (formerly Green College), Oxford, where he taught philosophy for many years. His work includes articles on philosophical logic, medical ethics, animal rights, and the philosophy of science.

He died on 24 June 2018 at the age of 74, after suffering from Alzheimer's disease.

== Works ==
- "The Grain Problem", Philosophy of mind: contemporary readings, Editors Timothy O'Connor, David Robb, Routledge, 2003, ISBN 978-0-415-28354-0
- "The Enigma of Sentience", Toward a science of consciousness II: the second Tucson discussions and debates Complex adaptive systems, Editors Stuart R. Hameroff, Alfred W. Kaszniak, Alwyn Scott, MIT Press, 1998, ISBN 978-0-262-08262-4
- Mind, brain, and the quantum: the compound 'I', B. Blackwell, 1989, ISBN 978-0-631-16183-7
- The Labyrinth of Time, Oxford University Press, 2005, ISBN 978-0-19-924995-4
