= Remo Segnana =

Italian politician (1925–2018)

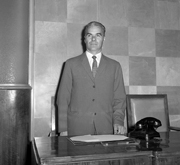

Remo Segnana (10 December 1925 – 16 June 2018) was an Italian politician who served as a Senator from 1968 to 1983.
