= Joel Grossman =

American politician, political scientist, and professor (1936–2018)

Joel Barry Grossman (June 19, 1936 – June 2, 2018) was an American politician and political scientist who was a professor of political science at Johns Hopkins University, and an adjunct member of the faculty at the University of Maryland, Baltimore School of Law.

His areas of specialty were American Politics and Constitutional Law. He had been teaching at Hopkins since 1996, before which he taught for over three decades at the University of Wisconsin–Madison.

Grossman was an editor of "Law & Society Review," and a number of books on American constitutional law and the Supreme court. Though often credited with being a Founder of the Law and Society Association, Grossman preferred to say that he was merely "there at the Founding." He co-edited "The Oxford Companion to the Supreme Court" (2005, 2nd ed.) with Kermit Hall.

In 2005 Grossman was awarded the Lifetime Achievement Award of the Law and Courts Section of the American Political Science Association. He died on June 2, 2018, at the age of 81.
