= Jack Cuffe =

Australian rules footballer

Personal information
- Full name: Jack Thomas Cuffe
- Born: 8 March 1931
- Died: 12 June 2018 (aged 87)
- Original team: Kensington
- Height: 170 cm (5 ft 7 in)
- Weight: 71 kg (157 lb)

Playing career^{1}
Years	Club	Games (Goals)
1951, 1953	North Melbourne	3 (0)
1954–55	St Kilda	3 (1)
Total		6 (1)
- ^{1} Playing statistics correct to the end of 1955.

Jack Thomas Cuffe (8 March 1931 – 12 June 2018) was an Australian rules footballer who played with North Melbourne and St Kilda in the Victorian Football League (VFL).
