= Howard Gardiner =

Zimbabwean cricketer and referee (1944–2018)

Personal information
- Full name: Howard Arthur Bruce Gardiner
- Born: 3 January 1944; Bulawayo, Rhodesia
- Died: 10 June 2018 (aged 74)
- Height: 6 ft 5 in (1.96 m)
- Batting: Right-handed
- Role: Wicketkeeper

International information
- National side: Rhodesia

Career statistics
Competition	First-class	List A
Matches	54	11
Runs scored	1700	124
Batting average	22.97	13.77
100s/50s	0/7	0/0
Top score	99	41
Balls bowled	-	-
Wickets	-	-
Bowling average	-	-
5 wickets in innings	-	-
10 wickets in match	-	N/A
Best bowling	-	-
Catches/stumpings	137/19	4/4
- Source: Cricket Archive, 23 October 2017

Howard Arthur Bruce Gardiner (3 January 1944 – 10 June 2018) was a Rhodesian first-class cricketer and international match referee.

He played as a wicketkeeper and useful lower-order batsman for Rhodesia from 1965 to 1976. After retiring he became a match referee, beginning in an ODI between Pakistan and Sri Lanka at Singapore in 1996. He went on to referee four more ODI games as well as a Test match at Centurion in 1998.

He was managing director of BOC Zimbabwe Ltd.
