= David Selberg =

Swedish ice hockey player (1995–2018)

- Born: 16 June 1995 Sweden
- Died: 17 June 2018 (aged 23)
- Height: 6 ft 0 in (183 cm)
- Weight: 190 lb (86 kg; 13 st 8 lb)
- Position: Defence
- Shot: Left
- SHL team: Luleå HF
- NHL draft: Undrafted
- Playing career: 2013–2018

David Selberg (16 June 1995 – 17 June 2018) was a Swedish ice hockey defenceman. He played with Luleå HF of the Swedish Hockey League (SHL).

Selberg made his Swedish Hockey League debut playing with Luleå HF during the 2013–14 SHL season.

Selberg's suicide was announced 18 June 2018.
