= María José Alcón =

Spanish politician

City Councilor of Culture of Valencia
- In office 1995–2009

Personal details
- Born: María José Alcón Miquel; 1961 Mislata, Province of Valencia, Spain
- Died: 16 June 2018 (aged 57) Callosa d'en Sarrià, Province of Alicante, Spain
- Spouse: Alfonso Grau (m. 2015 - her death 2018)
- Occupation: Jurist and Politician

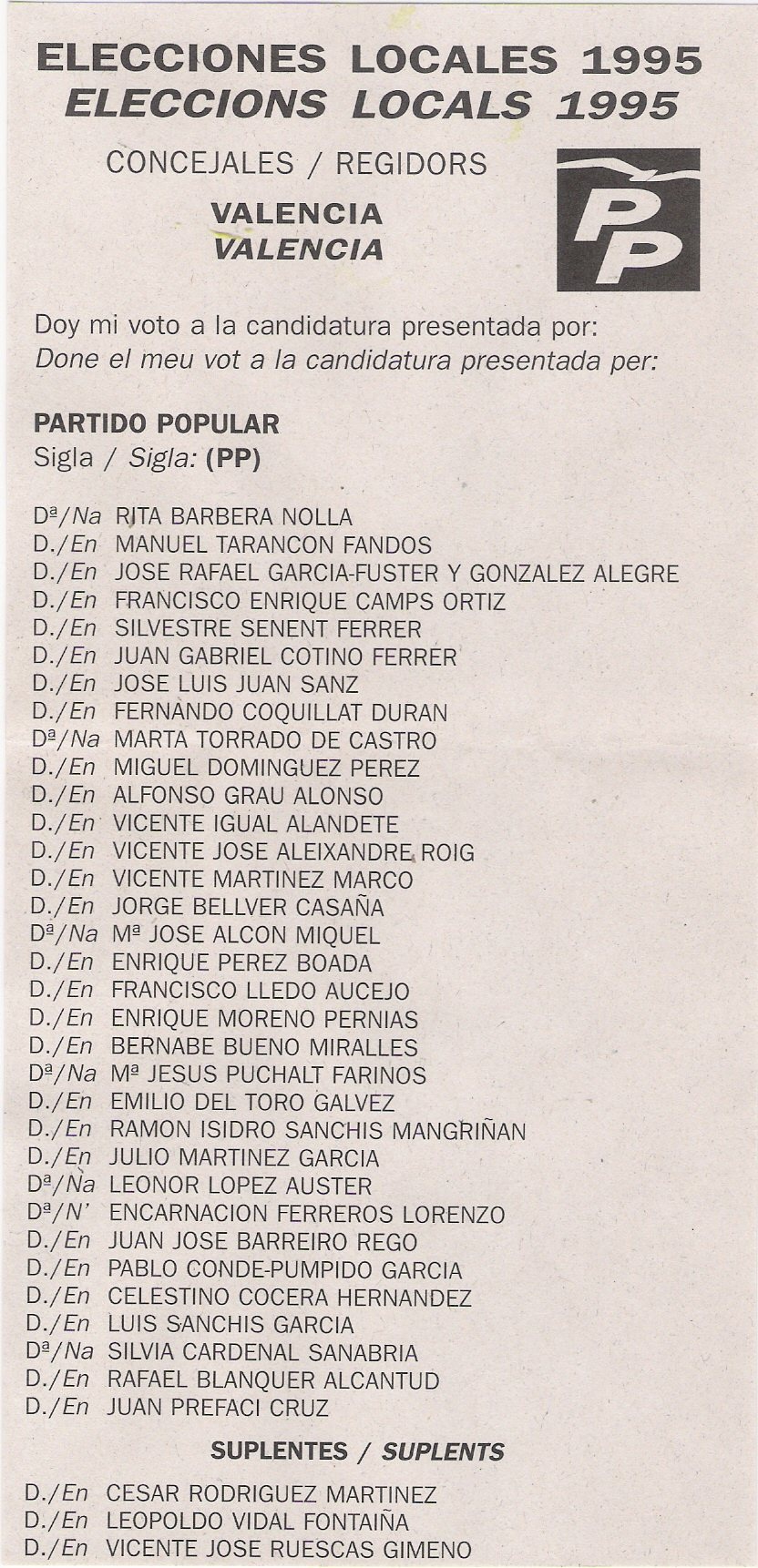
Ballot paper of the Popular Party. Municipality of Valencia local elections of 1995. María José Alcón is listed 16th here.

María José Alcón i Miquel (1961 – 16 June 2018) was a Spanish politician from People's Party.

Bachelor of Law and master's degree in Urban Law, she held the position of Councilor for Culture at the City Council of Valencia between 1995 and 2009,3 and left office after suffering an accident. After leaving the position of councilor, she continued at City Hall as a consultant, and also continued linked to PP.

On 2015, she was charged in the Taula case for money laundering. In a conversation with his son, recorded by the police, she recognized the alleged money laundering for the financing of the party in Valencia and explained the practice known as smurfing, consisting of some people received cash and at the same time they remitted a transfer for the same amount as a legal donation to the PP. In this corruption scandal was charged her husband, Alfonso Grau, who was Deputy Mayor between 1995 and 2015, and the former Mayoress Rita Barberá, who died two days after declaring in the Supreme Court in November 2016, both of the same political party. In 2015 she was again charged for a tax crime in the sale of real estate.

Alcón died on 16 June 2018 after falling from the balcony of her house in Callosa d'en Sarrià. Suicide is suspected.
