= Norma Bessouet =

Argentine artist, sculptor (1940–2018)

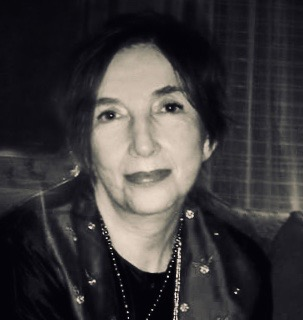
- Born: October 15, 1940; Buenos Aires, Argentina
- Died: June 11, 2018 (aged 77); Buenos Aires, Argentina
- Education: Academia de Bellas Artes Prilidiano Pueyrredon (1968)
- Known for: Painting; Sculpture
- Movement: Surrealism

Norma Bessouet (October 15, 1940 – 11 June 2018) was an Argentine painter and sculptor. Bessouet's work focused primarily around portraits, domesticity and the female nude. Her paintings were abstract in their style and she also created equally abstract wooden dolls.

== Early life and education ==
Norma Bessouet was born in Buenos Aires, Argentina. Her mother, Luisa Enero, was an illustrator and painter, who inspired Bessouet's interest as an artist. Her father, Ivan Bessouet, was a cabinetmaker. He and Enero supported Bessouet's interest in the visual arts. In 1964, she was accepted into the Academia de Bellas Artes Prilidiano Pueyrredon, which she graduated from in 1968. Bessouet studied under Ideal Sánchez. Bessouet was highly influenced by the work of Aída Carballo and often claimed Carballo as her one and only influence. Carballo worked at the Academia de Bellas Artes Prilidiano Pueyrredon, too. In 1974, she emigrated from Argentina to Europe.

== Work in Argentina ==
Art historian Marta Garsd has cited Carballo as being the primary influence on Bessouet's painting, including the introduction of the works of the Sienese School. The Sienese School influenced the "delicate line and color, and jewel-like surfaces," that were noted in Bessouet's work, alongside the female nude. She has found additional inspiration in the work of Marcel Schwob, with a specific interest in the emotional components of Schwob's work versus the artistic merits. Garsd describes Bessouet's work as being on the verge of abstraction and figurative art and on the verge of modernism along the style of Lino Eneas Spilimbergo. In 1971, Bessouet was awarded the grand prize for a female new drawing from the Argentine Academy of Arts.

Despite some success in Argentine competitions, Bessouet struggled to find commercial success and appreciation in the gallery scene of Buenos Aires. She was rejected from major galleries because she was a woman artist. She did not identify collectively with feminism and the female struggle and chose to attack the patriarchy of the fine art world independently rather than with other women artists, like the Union de Feministas Argentina.

== Relocation to Europe ==
In 1974, Bessouet relocated to London, England. She was awarded a fellowship from the Slade School of Fine Arts in London and also spent some time working in Italy and, in 1976, in Barcelona, Spain. In Spain, she attempted to gain attention for her woodworking. Her mother sent her cabinetmaking tools used by her father. With those tools, she made dolls, which had faces that "recalled the famous 19th-century prototypes created in Paris by Pierre Francois Jumeau," according to historian Marta Garsd. The dolls had glass eyes, clothing made of lace, and additional antique elements. The dolls are very abstract and have "organic elements" which are represented in enlarged heads, oddly shaped eyes, and exposed genitalia. She became a fellow, in 1981, at the Ministry of Culture in Spain. This fellowship had her traveling to New York City, where she would eventually relocate full-time.

== Life in New York ==
As of 1981, Bessouet lived in New York City as a full-time artist. She continued to explore her work with dolls. The dolls she created in New York were dramatically different than those in Spain. The dolls were "androgynous, "angelical," winged and made of transparent materials." The dolls have been described as "emblems of feminism" and "sexless creatures," by Garsd. While in New York, she focused primarily on painting, with her androgynous dolls making appearances in her work, often as erotic figures in mystical environments.

Bessouet worked in both New York and Buenos Aires and did not use professional models in her work, preferring to work with people she knew personally.
