= Cyrus Tang =

Chinese-American industrialist and entrepreneur

Cyrus Chung-Ying Tang 唐仲英
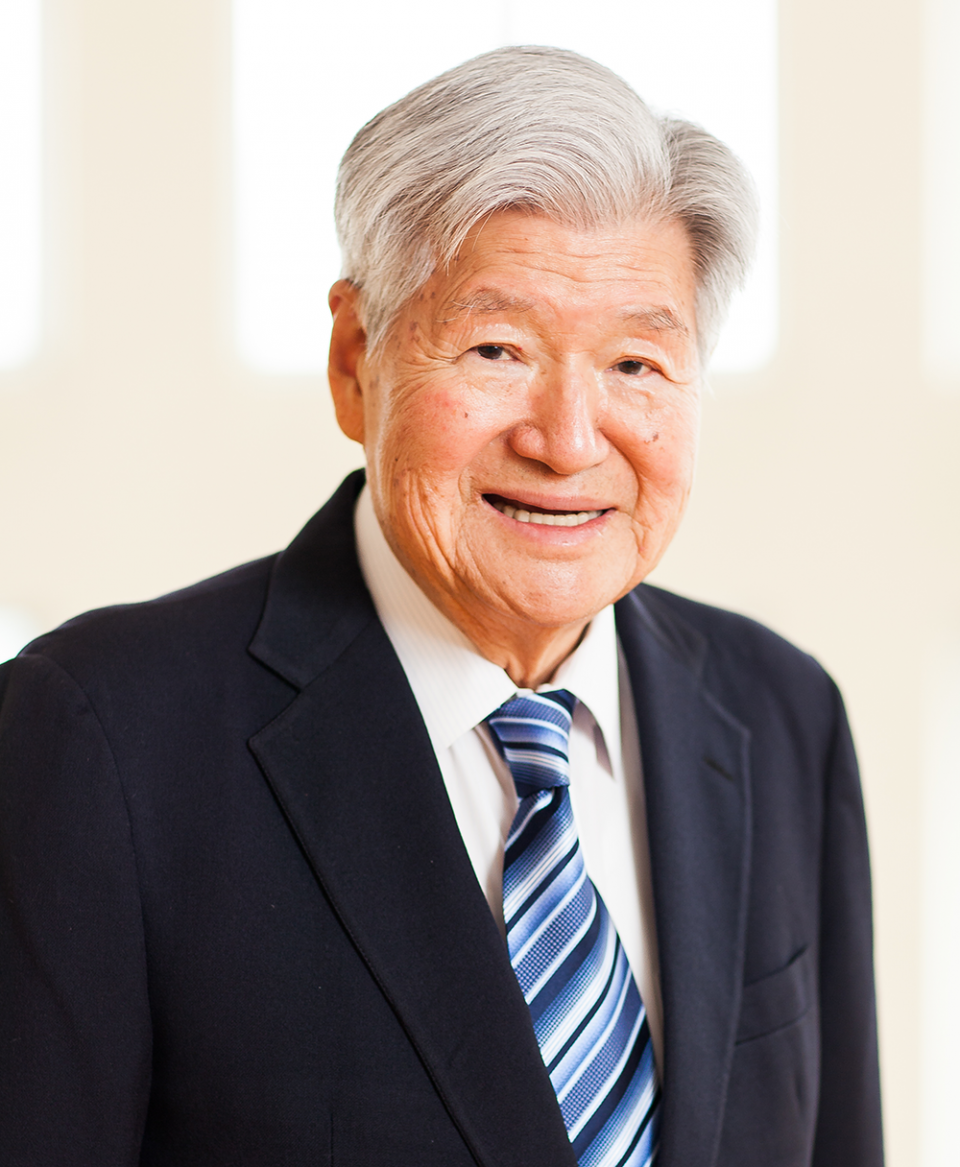
- Born: August 9, 1930; Suzhou, Jiangsu, China
- Died: June 23, 2018 (Aged 87); Las Vegas, Nevada, US
- Known for: Founder of the National Material Limited Partnership, Tang Foundations, and Tang Industries Inc.

Cyrus Chung-Ying Tang (Chinese: 唐仲英; pinyin: Táng Zhòngyīng; August 9, 1930 in Suzhou, Jiangsu, China – June 23, 2018 in Las Vegas, Nevada, United States) was a Chinese American industrialist, entrepreneur, and philanthropist. He founded and acquired companies across industries, including steel, metals, life sciences, and manufacturing, primarily through U.S.-based ventures such as Tang Industries and National Material Limited Partnership. Cyrus Tang was also recognized for his philanthropic work in cultural exchange, education, and healthcare, particularly through the Cyrus Tang Foundation, the Cyrus and Michael Tang Foundation, and the Tang Foundation for the Research of Traditional Chinese Medicine, which operated both in the United States and China.

== Early years ==
Cyrus Tang was born on August 9, 1930 in Suzhou, Jiangsu, China. He grew up in a traditional Chinese household during a period of political instability and war.

In 1949, during the Chinese Civil War, Cyrus Tang moved to Hong Kong, and later pursued higher education in the United States.

In 1950, he arrived in the United States from Hong Kong to study at Pennsylvania Military Academy (now Widener University) before eventually relocating to Chicago, Illinois.

After completing his studies, Cyrus Tang relocated to Chicago, Illinois, where he began working in various industrial roles. These early professional experiences in manufacturing and operations laid the groundwork for his eventual entrepreneurship in the steel and manufacturing sectors.

== Business career ==
In 1964, Cyrus Tang founded National Material Limited Partnership, a steel processing and distribution company headquartered in the Chicago area. The company began as a single operation but gradually expanded its services, supplying materials to manufacturers across North America. By the 1980s, National Materials Limited Partnership operated multiple processing & steel service centers, serving a variety of industrial clients.

In 1971, Cyrus Tang founded Tang Industries Inc., a private holding company based in Las Vegas, Nevada. Through Tang Industries and its affiliated businesses, he expanded into a wide range of sectors including metal fabrication, aluminium die casting, recycling, logistics, biotechnology, pharmaceuticals, and real estate. The businesses operated across the United States, Canada, Mexico, and China.

In 1995, Cyrus Tang formally established the Cyrus Tang Foundation (Chinese: 唐仲英基金会; Pinyin: Táng Zhòngyīng Jījīn Huì), along with the Cyrus and Michael Tang Foundation, and the Tang Foundation for the Research of Traditional Chinese Medicine. These philanthropic organizations dedicated to supporting initiatives in community development, education, and healthcare.

== Awards ==
Cyrus Tang received several recognitions for his philanthropic and civic contributions throughout his lifetime. In 2006, he was honored with the Public Service Award from the National Association of Latino Elected and Appointed Officials (NALEO) in recognition of his commitment to community development and public service. In 2007, he was named a recipient of the Silver Anniversary Award from the California Community Foundation, acknowledging his long-standing support for charitable causes.

Cyrus Tang's philanthropic legacy is reflected in programs and academic appointments named in his honor, including the Cyrus Tang Traditional Chinese Medicine Award, established in 2005 to support research in herbal medicine, and the Tang Chair in China Policy Studies at the RAND Corporation, created in 2019 through a grant from the Cyrus and Michael Tang Foundation.

== Philanthropy ==
In 1995, Cyrus Tang established the Cyrus Tang Foundation (Chinese: 唐仲英基金会; Pinyin: Táng Zhòngyīng Jījīn Huì), a non-profit organization that funds cross-cultural exchange initiatives, disaster relief, educational, and healthcare in the United States and China. As of 2024, Cyrus Tang Foundation has provided scholarships and fellowships to 14,256 students in Chinese universities and has supported programs related to medical aid, public health, and teacher training. The experience transformed many of them from "feeling sorry for themselves to wondering what they do to help others,"he told the Los Angeles Times in 2008. In the United States, the Cyrus Tang Foundation and the Cyrus and Michael Tang Foundation have contributed to civic engagement initiatives, higher education institutions, and research programs.
