= Francisco Griéguez =

Spanish soldier (1918–2018)

- Birth name: Francisco Griéguez Pina
- Born: 25 October 1918; Murcia, Spain
- Died: 20 June 2018 (aged 99); Gardanne, France
- Allegiance: Republican faction
- Battles / wars: Spanish Civil War; World War II
- Spouse(s): Juana

Francisco Griéguez Pina (25 October 1918 – 20 June 2018) was a Spanish soldier from Murcia who fought in the Spanish Civil War and World War II. He was the last survivor of the Nazi concentration camps from Murcia.

Francisco Griéguez was born 25 October 1918 in Murcia. As a young man, he worked in a toy factory before the Spanish Civil War began. At age 17, Griéguez enlisted as a Republican volunteer.

In 1939, following the Catalonia Offensive by the Nationalists, Griéguez went into exile in France. There, he joined the 27th Company of Spanish Workers, which was bound to defend the Maginot Line from German forces. In June 1940, Griéguez was arrested by the Gestapo. He was sent to Stalag XII-D, a prisoner-of-war camp in Trier. On 3 April 1941, he was transferred to the Mauthausen concentration camp. On 5 May 1945, over four years later, Mauthausen was liberated by US forces. Griéguez returned to France, where he settled in Gardanne.

In 1975, following the death of Francisco Franco, Griéguez was able to visit Spain, although he continued living in Gardanne.

By 2017, Griéguez was the last living Murcian survivor of the Nazi concentration camps.

Griéguez died 20 June 2018 in Gardanne at the age of 99. He was survived by his wife Juana.
