= Constance Adams =

American architect

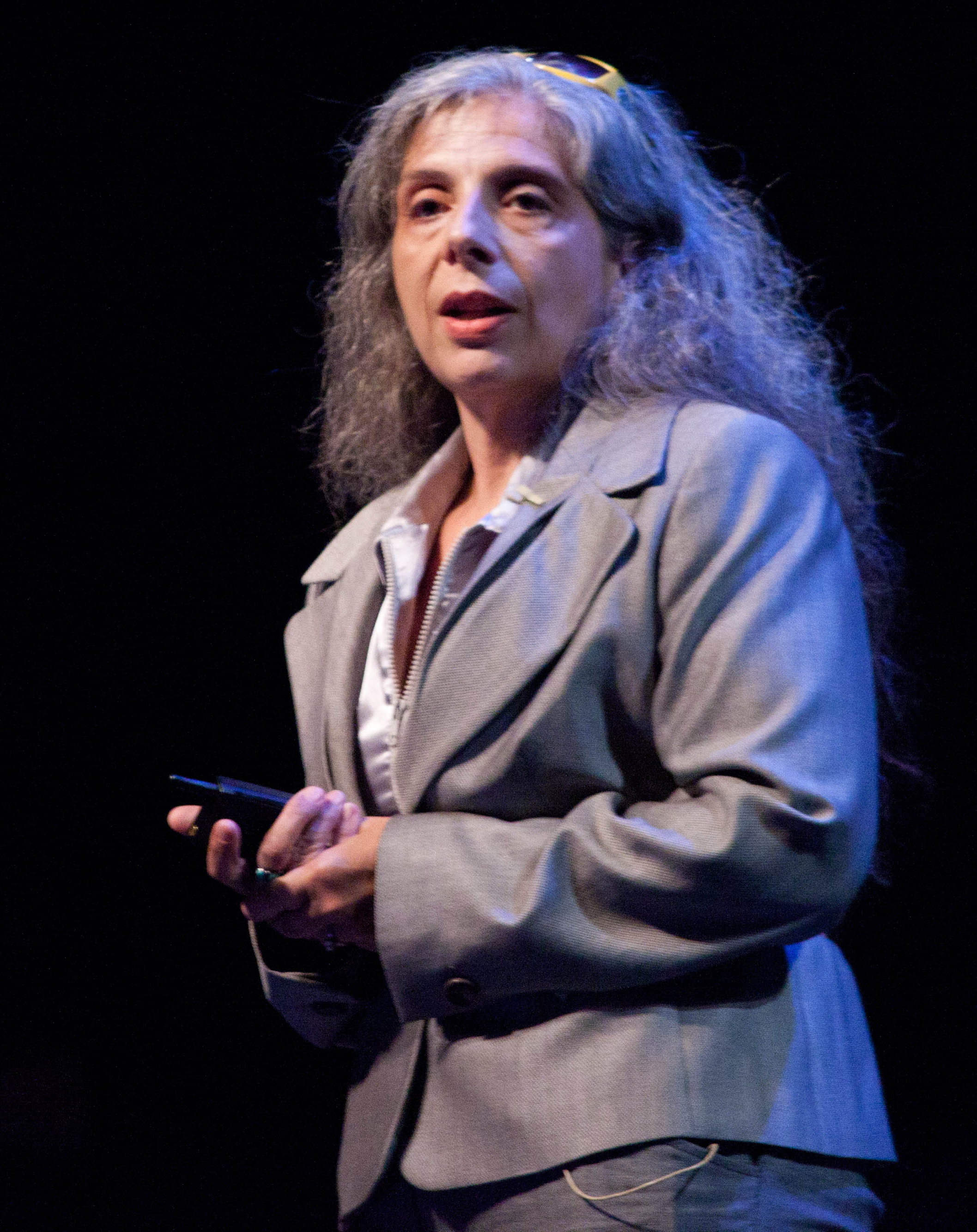
Adams presenting at TEDxHouston in June 2011

TEDxHouston 2011 – Constance Adams – Space Architect

Constance Adams (16 July 1964 – 25 June 2018) was an American architect who worked in the space program.

== Personal life ==
Adams was born in Boston in 1964 to Jeremy duQuesnay Adams, a medieval scholar at Southern Methodist University in Dallas, and Madeleine de Jean, a writer and connoisseur of champagne.

Adams studied social studies at Harvard University, then went on to Yale University, where she completed a master's degree in architecture. After a two-year apprenticeship with Kenzo Tange Associates in Tokyo, followed by four years working in Berlin on commercial and master planning projects. In the late 1990s she was employed by Lockheed Martin Space Operations, to support the NASA's Mars exploration research efforts at the Johnson Space Center in Houston, Texas, where she lived with her family. She was a Registered Architect.

She is particularly known for her developments in "sociokinetic" research, in which she discovered ways to measure how individuals interact with their built environments and with one another.

Adams died of colorectal cancer in Houston on 25 June 2018, aged 53.

== Career ==
Among other projects, Adams was involved in developing the Lockheed Martin design of an inflatable module for the International Space Station. The module, known as TransHab ("transit habitat"), was designed to provide living quarters for astronauts aboard the space station, including a common room, gymnasium, shower, etc. Budget considerations and delays, as well as politics, meant that the module failed to develop beyond the design stage.

Subsequent to the TransHab project, Adams worked on crew cabin architecture and systems design for the X-38 Crew Return Vehicle, Orbital Space Plane and International Space Station.

In 2003 and 2004, Adams collaborated with UNDP Senior Water Policy Advisor Ingvar Andersson to organize the "Water for Two Worlds" summit at Columbia University and the UN, bringing representatives of NASA, the European Space Agency, the Columbia Earth Institute and other clean water advocacy groups to design an approach for transferring water cleansing techniques developed for spaceflight to applications that meet the Millennium Development Goals.

In 2005, Adams was named an Emerging Explorer by National Geographic. From 2004 to 2010, Adams worked with the International Space Station Program Office and the Japanese Aerospace Exploration Agency to integrate the H-II Transfer Vehicle into ISS planning. Founder of Synthesis International, Adams partnered with URS and Foster+Partners to work on the design of the world's first commercial spaceport terminal, the Spaceport America Terminal Facility, for the New Mexico Spaceport Authority and tenant Virgin Galactic. She was considered one of the first experts in spaceport planning, and lectured widely in design as well as science topics.

Between 2008 and 2009, Adams participated in National Geographic's JASON Project (now JASON Learning, an independent 501c3) as a Host Researcher. She is featured in the last chapter (chapter 5) and supporting videos of the publication Infinite Potential. Her work in understanding sustainable systems is the emphasis of the chapter.
