= Margaret Ann Ireland =

Canadian artist (1928–2018)

- Born: Margaret Ann Ireland; March 23, 1928; Winnipeg, Manitoba
- Died: June 30, 2018 (aged 90); Saint John, New Brunswick, Canada
- Education: Royal Conservatory of Music where her teachers included Healey Willan and Hayunga Carman; Mieczyslaw Horszowski, New York (1945-1950), Friedrich Wuehrer in Salzburg and Vienna (1951), and Marguerite Long, Paris (1952)
- Spouse(s): Norwood Carter (d. 1971); Walter Nagel (d. 2004)
- Awards: Canada 125 Medal and an honorary Doctor of Letters degree from the University of New Brunswick
- Elected: member of the New Brunswick Arts Board (1990)

Margaret Ann Ireland D.Litt. (March 23, 1928 – June 20, 2018) was a pianist known in Canada and abroad in the 1950s and 1960s, and had a second career in Toronto and New York as a radio producer.

== Career ==
Ireland grew up in Toronto and began piano lessons at the age of six. At the age of eight, she was awarded a scholarship to the Royal Conservatory of Music. When she was ten, she composed her musical work Pioneer Lullaby; it was published in 1939. (The first page is in the Margaret Ann Ireland file at the Literature, Music, Performing Arts, Archives Branch, Library and Archives Canada / Government of Canada). Later, she studied with Mieczyslaw Horszowski in New York (1945–1950), Friedrich Wuehrer in Salzburg and Vienna in 1951, and Marguerite Long in Paris in 1952.

She debuted in 1944 with the Toronto Symphony Orchestra, receiving praise from the Toronto Globe and Mail which said her execution was imbued with musical intelligence, then gave lecture recitals for CBC radio (1949–1952). In 1960, on her first tour of the USSR, the conductor of the Kharkov state orchestra described her as a high-class performer. She recalled of it the audience's enthusiasm and that she was often asked to play Rachmaninoff's Second Piano Concerto with orchestras on tour.

Her New York debut took place in 1963 at Town Hall and in 1963 and 1964, she recorded three titles for Capitol Records of Canada Ltd.: Margaret Ann Ireland plays Schubert, Rachmaninoff, Margaret Ann Ireland plays Villa-Lobos, Granados, and Margaret Ann Ireland plays music of the Polish masters, The Rachmaninoff works she recorded, Six Preludes from Opus 23, were said to be consistently interesting and bold. She was described in 1969 as one of the classical music staples of Capitol Records.

As a producer, she prepared many major music programs for radio. Her series 'Musicscope' (the CBC's flagship series 1971–1972), received a Major Armstrong Award (Chicago, 1972). She donated several personal items to the sound and moving images section of the CBC Archives (available at https://www.cbc.ca/listen/shows/shift-nb/segment/15608307).

Her awards included the 125th Anniversary of the Confederation of Canada Medal and an honorary Doctor of Letters degree from the University of New Brunswick. After her death, she asked that family and friends listen to Rachmaninoff's Vocalise Opus 34 No. 14 as they remembered her.

Ireland's portrait by Miller Brittain (1961) is in the collection of the Beaverbrook Art Gallery, Fredericton. In it, Brittain inserted shards of glass to indicate her flashing hands when she played. In 1967, John Reeves photographed she and her family for the National Film Board of Canada and the photostory has been published on-line by the National Gallery of Canada; it is part of the Canadian Museum of Contemporary Photography fonds, National Gallery of Canada Library and Archives.
