= Errikos Briolas =

Greek actor

Errikos Briolas (Greek: Ερρίκος Μπριόλας; 19 October 1933 in Athens – 20 June 2018) was a Greek actor in theater, cinema, and television.

Briolas' family were motorists; Errikos followed the same profession and became a taxi driver until his second wife urged him to become an actor. He played in many Greek films roles, and due to his appearance and talent, became very popular. He later appeared in many theater performances. On television he starred in the series Ten Minutes (2000) and Time The Good (2004). From 1985 to 1990, he participated in 19 productions.

Briolas died on June 20, 2018, after a short hospital stay, during which he was particularly overworked.
