= Hyon Ju-song =

North Korean lieutenant general

Hyon Ju-song (Korean: 현주성; 1961/1962 – 2018) was a North Korean lieutenant general. After the 2018 North Korea–United States summit, which focused on peace and denuclearization, he decided: "We no longer have to suffer and tighten our belts to make rockets or nuclear weapons." Acting as director of the services inspection division of the People's Armed Forces, he told his troops to send out a ton of fuel, 1,278 pounds of rice and 1,653 pounds of corn to soldiers and their families at his site. He was charged with and convicted of abuse of authority, profiting the enemy and anti-party acts, before his execution by firing squad at the Kang Kon Military Academy near Pyongyang in June 2018.
