= Web Harrison =

American football player and coach (1940–2018)

Biographical details
- Born: March 31, 1940; Torrington, Connecticut, U.S.
- Died: June 17, 2018 (aged 78); Auburn, Maine, U.S.

Playing career

Football
- 1959–1962: Bates

Coaching career (HC unless noted)

Football
- 1978–1991: Bates

Men's lacrosse
- 1978–1995: Bates

Women's track and field
- 1977–1979: Bates

Head coaching record
- Overall: 39–70–3 (football); 124–113 (men's lacrosse)

Webster Lee Harrison (March 31, 1940 – June 17, 2018) was an American football player and coach. He served as the head football coach at Bates College in Lewiston, Maine from 1978 to 1991. He also served as the school's head men's lacrosse coach from 1978 to 1995, tallying a mark of 124–113.
