= Leonard McComb =

British painter (1930–2018)

Leonard William Joseph McComb RA (3 August 1930 – 19 June 2018) was a Scottish artist. He described his work as visual abstractions after nature. He was very interested in the detail in nature and declared that everything he drew or painted, whether a portrait head, flower, landscape, still life, or breaking sea wave, was, for him, a portrait.

== Education ==
Leonard McComb studied at Manchester School of Art and subsequently at the Slade School of Fine Art from 1956 to 1959, followed by a Postgraduate in sculpture, also at the Slade, in 1960. He went on to teach at various art schools, including Oxford Brookes University, Sir John Cass College, Slade School of Fine Art, Royal College of Art and Goldsmiths College, and in 1974 he founded the Sunningwell School of Art, Oxford.

== Biography ==
He was a versatile artist who celebrated working in various media and was unusual amongst his contemporaries in being represented in the Tate Gallery Collection with works in oil, watercolour, and print, as well as sculpture. His sculpture, Young Man Standing, also known as the Golden Man (Tate Gallery), was the subject of National controversy when it was withdrawn from exhibition in Lincoln Cathedral as it was considered indecent by a senior cathedral cleric.

Having destroyed most of his early work, McComb was included in the exhibition, The Human Clay, held at the Hayward Gallery in 1976; his first solo show was held the following year at the Coracle Press. In 1983, an Arts Council touring exhibition, entitled Leonard McComb Drawing Painting Sculpture, was organised by the Museum of Modern Art, Oxford and shown at the Serpentine Gallery, London; City Art Gallery, Manchester; Gardner Arts Centre, University of Sussex; and the Fruit Market Gallery, Edinburgh. His work continued to be exhibited in many important group shows, including the Whitechapel Art Gallery in 1982, the Tate Gallery in 1984, the Hirshhorn Museum, Washington D.C. in 1986, and the Museum of Modern Art, Brussels in 1987.

Among McComb’s many awards are the Royal Academy’s Jubilee Award (1977); Korn Ferry Award (1990); Times Watercolour Prize (1992 and 1993); Nordstern Print Prize (1997); and the RWS Prize (1998). McComb has received many major commissions for private and corporate collections throughout the UK, Europe, and the USA. In 1999, he completed a commissioned portrait of the novelist Doris Lessing for the National Portrait Gallery, London. The following year, he was selected by the Vatican to design a Jubilee Medal, featuring Pope John Paul II and the late Archbishop Basil Hume, for the worldwide series to commemorate the Millennium.

McComb was elected Royal Academician in 1991 (ARA 1987) and, in 1995, was elected Keeper of the Royal Academy, placing him in charge of the Royal Academy Schools until 1998. He was made an Honorary Member of the Royal Watercolour Society and the Royal Society of Printmakers in 1996. McComb lived and worked in Brixton, London.

He was married three times: to Elizabeth Henstock in 1955 (from whom he was divorced 8 years later), to Joan Allwork in 1966 (she died in 1967) and to Barbara Gittel in 1973 (from whom he was divorced in 1999). He died on 19 June 2018 at the age of 87. His sisters Moira and Anne survived him.
