= Bernard Ginsborg =

Bernard Ginsborg FRSE
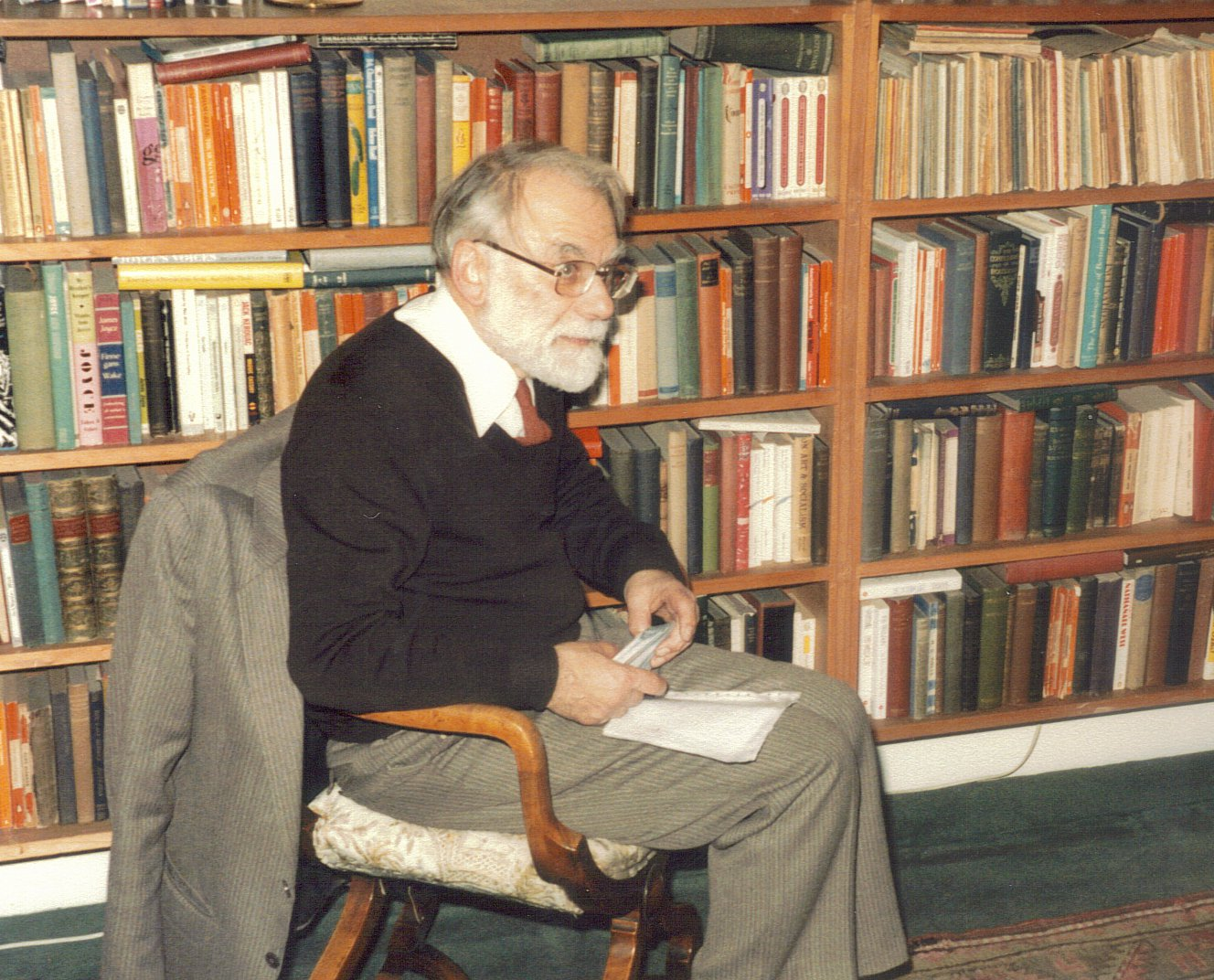
- Bernard Ginsborg in 1985
- Born: Bernard Lionel Ginsborg; 22 January 1925; London, England
- Died: 26 June 2018 (aged 93); Edinburgh, UK
- Education: University of Reading (BSc, PhD)
- Known for: Electrophysiology; Pharmacology; Ion channels
- Scientific career
- Fields: Pharmacology; Biophysics
- Workplaces: University College London; MRC National Institute for Medical Research; University of Edinburgh
- Thesis: An investigation of small eye movements (1953)
- Doctoral advisor: R.W. Ditchburn

Bernard Lionel Ginsborg FRSE (22 January 1925 – 26 June 2018) was a British pharmacologist and physiologist.

== Early life ==
Bernard Ginsborg was born on 22 January 1925, the youngest child of Henry Ginsborg and Mala Rebbe, who came from Riga (now in Latvia) and Kovno (or Kaunas, now in Lithuania) in 1913 or 1914 ("between the revolutions", as Mala said). Henry worked in a wharf in east London and was subsequently a supervisor in a toy factory. An older brother, Eddie, died before Bernard was born, but he grew up very close to his sisters Bertha (who became a chemist and lecturer in chemistry at the University of Surrey) and Rebecca, who trained as a lawyer.

== Education ==
Ginsborg took a Bachelor of Science degree (BSc Hons) in physics at the University of Reading in 1948, and continued in the physics department to do a PhD under the supervision of R. W. Ditchburn, awarded in 1953.

== Career and research ==
Ginsborg's work on membrane biophysics began when he joined the Biophysics Department in University College London, under Bernard Katz. In 1957 he moved to the MRC National Institute for Medical Research in Mill Hill when Walter Perry recruited him to join the scientific staff. In 1958 he moved to the University of Edinburgh again at Perry’s invitation when Perry became the Professor of Pharmacology. Bernard ascended the academic ladder quickly from a Lectureship in 1962, to a readership in 1964 and finally to a Personal Chair in 1976. He became head of the department of pharmacology at the University of Edinburgh in 1980, succeeding Eric Horton, and served until 1985, when he was replaced by John S. Kelly. Further details can be found in the documents by Jane Ginsborg, Donald H. Jenkinson and by Randall House which are available from David Colquhoun.

=== Awards and honours ===
He was elected a Fellow of the Royal Society of Edinburgh (FRSE) in 1971.
