= Larry Thomas (political advisor) =

American political journalist and press secretary

- Born: c. 1948; San Diego, California, U.S.
- Died: June 11, 2018 (aged 70); Newport Beach, California, U.S.
- Education: San Diego State University
- Occupations: Political journalist, press secretary

Larry Thomas (c. 1948 – June 11, 2018) was an American political journalist and press secretary.

== Early life ==
Thomas was born c. 1948 in San Diego, California. He graduated from San Diego State University, where he earned a bachelor's degree in journalism.

== Career ==
Thomas began his career at United Press International, followed by KPBS and Copley Press. He later became a political journalist for The San Diego Union-Tribune.

Thomas worked as an advisor to San Diego Mayor Pete Wilson in the 1970s, followed by California Governor George Deukmejian from 1982 to 1987. In March 1987, Vice President George H. W. Bush hired him as his press secretary during his presidential campaign, but Thomas left after only three months, citing "complex personal reasons". He was also an advisor to Governor Arnold Schwarzenegger.

Thomas worked as corporate communications director for the Irvine Company from 1987 to 2007.

== Death ==
Thomas died of cancer on June 11, 2018, at his residence in Newport Beach, California, at 70.
