= Francesco Forleo =

Italian politician (1941–2018)

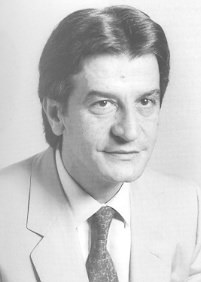

Italian Chamber of Deputies
- In office c. 1987 – c. 1994

Personal details
- Born: November 13, 1941
- Died: June 24, 2018 (aged 76)

Francesco Forleo (13 November 1941 – 24 June 2018) was an Italian politician who served as a Deputy from 1987 to 1994.
