= Lutz Pyritz =

German jockey and horse trainer

Lutz Pyritz (5 March 1950 in Seelow – 1 June 2018 in Dresden) was a German jockey and horse trainer.

Pyritz began his training to become a jockey in 1974 in Hoppegarten, and completed his apprenticeship in 1976. He was considered one of the most exceptional jockeys in East German history, and won the GDR Galoppderby in 1983 with the horse Zigeunerheld, and again in 1985 and 1990. On 8 May 1994, he set a new German record when he won seven victories in Dresden in one day. Overall, he won a total of 848 flat races between 1975 and 1998. In addition, he had 23 wins in hurdle and hunting races. After his retirement from jockeying in 1998, he took to coaching that same year.
