= Wolfgang Lippert (botanist) =

German botanist

Wolfgang Lippert (26 September 1937 in Nördlingen-20 June 2018) was a German botanist. His main areas of interest are the Spermatophytes.
