= Deaths in November 2018 =

The following is a list of notable deaths in November 2018.

Entries for each day are listed alphabetically by surname. A typical entry lists information in the following sequence:

- Name, age, country of citizenship at birth, subsequent country of citizenship (if applicable), reason for notability, cause of death (if known), and reference.

== November 2018 ==
=== 1 ===
- Francesco Barbaro, 91, Italian gangster, head of the Barbaro 'ndrina.
- Vinton Beckett, 95, Jamaican Olympic athlete.
- Nicolas Ghosn, 78, Lebanese lawyer and politician, member of the Parliament (1996–2000, 2005–2018).
- Carlo Giuffrè, 89, Italian actor (The Railroad Man, The Girl with the Pistol, Poker in Bed) and stage director.
- Bunny Grant, 78, Jamaican boxer, stroke.
- Leroy Haley, 65, American boxer.
- Theodor Hoffmann, 83, German admiral, Chief of the Volksmarine (1987–1989) and East Germany Minister of Defense (1989–1990).
- Terry Musser, 70, American politician, member of the Wisconsin State Assembly (1985–2009).
- Dave Pickerell, 62, American distiller (Maker's Mark), hypertensive heart failure.
- Mariano Rajoy Sobredo, 97, Spanish jurist and magistrate.
- Ken Swofford, 85, American actor (Fame, Ellery Queen, The Andromeda Strain).
- E. K. Turner, 91, Canadian businessman (Saskatchewan Wheat Pool) and educator, chancellor of the University of Saskatchewan (1986–1989), lymphoma.
- Yurik Vardanyan, 62, Armenian weightlifter, Olympic champion (1980).
- Edmund Zagorski, 63, American convicted double murderer, execution by electric chair.
- Paul Zimmerman, 86, American sportswriter (Sports Illustrated).

=== 2 ===
- Jean Bertaina, 90, French cyclist.
- Stanley Bilinski, 65, American bishop.
- Naftali Bon, 73, Kenyan Olympic athlete (1968).
- Nelson Chabay, 78, Uruguayan footballer (Montevideo, Avellaneda, national team).
- Raymond Chow, 91, Hong Kong film producer (Golden Harvest) and presenter.
- John Russell, 27th Baron de Clifford, 90, British aristocrat.
- Leonard Enright, 65, Irish hurler (Patrickswell, Limerick).
- Josh Fauver, 39, American rock bassist (Deerhunter).
- Herbert Fingarette, 97, American philosopher, heart failure.
- Mark Fosson, 68, American primitive guitarist, cancer.
- Roy Hargrove, 49, American jazz trumpeter, Grammy winner (1997, 2002), cardiac arrest.
- Jane H. Hill, 79, American anthropologist and linguist.
- Max Levitas, 103, Irish communist activist.
- Álvaro de Luna, 83, Spanish actor (That Man in Istanbul, Ballad of a Bounty Hunter, Order to Kill), liver cancer.
- Kitty O'Neil, 72, American stuntwoman, pneumonia.
- Devah Pager, 46, American sociologist, pancreatic cancer.
- Poongani, 84, Indian Villu Paatu performer.
- Albert Ramassamy, 94, French politician, Senator (1983–1987).
- Garry Rempel, 74, Canadian chemical engineer.
- Tomás Rodríguez Bolaños, 74, Spanish politician, Mayor of Valladolid (1979–1995), Deputy (1993–2004), Senator (2004–2008).
- Sami-ul-Haq, 80, Pakistani cleric and politician, Senator (1985–1997, 2003–2009), stabbed.
- Gil Savery, 101, American journalist.
- Glenn Schwartz, 78, American musician (James Gang, Pacific Gas & Electric, All Saved Freak Band).
- Merete Skavlan, 98, Norwegian actress and director.
- Robert F. Taft, 86, American Jesuit priest, Archimandrite of the Ukrainian Greek Catholic Church.
- Andrew Urdiales, 54, American serial killer, suicide by hanging.
- Alan Wagner, 79, American operatic baritone and voice teacher

=== 3 ===
- Wahiduddin Ahmed, 95, Bangladeshi academic, Vice-Chancellor of Bangladesh University of Engineering and Technology (1975–1983).
- Jean-Paul Baréty, 90, French politician, Deputy (1994–1997), Mayor of Nice (1993–1995).
- Janusz Bielański, 79, Polish Roman Catholic priest, rector of the Wawel Cathedral (1983–2007).
- René Boucher, 89, French Olympic rower.
- Chris Bradshaw, 74, Canadian politician.
- Joe Clayton, 69, American business executive (Dish Network).
- Roland Douce, 79, French botanist.
- Alistair Elliot, 86, British poet and translator.
- Eddie Foy III, 83, American casting director (Barney Miller).
- Maria Guinot, 73, Portuguese singer ("Silêncio e tanta gente"), lung infection.
- Colin Holt, 84, Australian footballer (Carlton, Richmond).
- Sadaharu Horio, 79, Japanese artist.
- Mari Hulman George, 83, American motorsport executive (Indianapolis Motor Speedway).
- Hans Kindermann, 96, German jurist.
- Ev Kjelbertson, 83, American college football player and coach.
- John Large, 75, British consulting nuclear engineer.
- Sondra Locke, 74, American actress (The Heart Is a Lonely Hunter, The Outlaw Josey Wales, Sudden Impact), breast and bone cancer.
- John Marttila, 78, American political strategist, prostate cancer.
- Jean Mohr, 93, Swiss documentary photographer.
- Mimoun El Oujdi, 68, Moroccan raï singer, cancer.
- Roger Victor Rakotondrajao, 58, Malagasy Roman Catholic prelate, Bishop of Mahajanga (since 2010).
- Ramona Ripston, 91, American civil rights activist (ACLU).
- Jayne Roylance, 71, English lawn bowler.
- Eric Schiller, 63, American chess player and author, complications from heart disease.
- Brent R. Taylor, 39, American military officer, Mayor of North Ogden, Utah (since 2013), shot.
- David Tejada, 89, Peruvian doctor, Minister of Health (1985–1987, 1989) and deputy Director General of WHO (1974–1985).
- J. Willard Thompson, 83, American racehorse trainer.

=== 4 ===
- José Rafael Abinader, 89, Dominican politician, Senator (1998–2002).
- Karl-Heinz Adler, 91, German artist.
- Manohar Prahlad Awati, 91, Indian Navy vice admiral.
- Donna Axum, 76, American model and beauty pageant winner (Miss America 1964), complications from Parkinson's disease.
- Gian Luca Barandun, 24, Swiss alpine skier, paragliding crash.
- Bill Brown, 80, American football player (Minnesota Vikings, Chicago Bears).
- Bruno Caruso, 91, Sicilian painter, illustrator, writer and political activist.
- Evelyn Y. Davis, 89, American activist shareholder.
- Marco Dezzi Bardeschi, 84, Italian architect.
- Aleksandr Galkin, 70, Russian football player (Avangard Kursk) and manager.
- Jack Gargan, 88, American politician.
- Bernie Glassman, 79, American Zen Buddhist monk, complications from a stroke.
- Roman Grinev, 41, Russian jazz bassist, fall.
- Kateryna Handziuk, 33, Ukrainian politician, thrombosis.
- Katherine Herring, 85, American baseball player (All-American Girls Professional Baseball League).
- Sir Jeremy Heywood, 56, British civil servant, Cabinet Secretary (2012–2018), cancer.
- Harris Hines, 75, American judge, Chief Justice of the Supreme Court of Georgia (2017–2018), traffic collision.
- Hung Wen-tung, 80, Taiwanese orthopedist and politician, MLY (1984–1990).
- Tariqul Islam, 73, Bangladeshi politician, Minister of Food (2001–2002) and Information (2002–2004), complications from diabetes.
- Robin Jeffrey, 79, Scottish engineer and businessman.
- Khalid Ibrahim Khan, 69, Pakistani politician, brain haemorrhage.
- Richard Le Hir, 71, Canadian politician.
- Mustapha Madih, 62, Moroccan football manager.
- Vince Manuwai, 38, American football player (Jacksonville Jaguars, Atlanta Falcons), ecstasy poisoning.
- Bertil Mårtensson, 73, Swedish author, smoke inhalation.
- Jacques Masdeu-Arus, 76, French politician.
- Jacques Muller, 62, French animator (Who Framed Roger Rabbit, Shrek 2, Quest for Camelot).
- John Njenga, 89, Kenyan Roman Catholic prelate, Archbishop of Mombasa (1990–2005).
- Grant R. Osborne, 76, American theologian.
- Mike Parker, 75, American news reporter (KFI-AM, KNXT, WBBM-TV).
- Juan Antonio Ramírez Sunyer, 71, Spanish judge (Operation Anubis, 2017 Catalan independence referendum).
- Goji Sakamoto, 74, Japanese politician.
- Shin Seong-il, 81, South Korean actor (To the Last Day, Prince Yeonsan, Why the Cuckoo Cries), lung cancer.
- Serhiy Tkach, 66, Soviet-Ukrainian serial killer, heart failure.
- Padma Ratna Tuladhar, 78, Nepalese politician, brain haemorrhage.
- Douglas Turner, 86, American Olympic rower (1956) and journalist (The Buffalo News).
- Wang Huanyu, 63, Chinese astrophysicist, heart attack.

=== 5 ===
- Keith Christiansen, 74, Canadian-born American Hall of Fame ice hockey player (Minnesota Fighting Saints), Olympic silver medalist (1972), lung cancer.
- Héctor Ferrer, 48, Puerto Rican politician, member of the House of Representatives of Puerto Rico (2001–2018), esophageal cancer.
- Ali Squalli Houssaini, 86, Moroccan writer, lyricist of the national anthem.
- Nadezhda Kehayova, 40, Bulgarian journalist, heart attack.
- Rick Reinert, 93, American animator (Cap'n O. G. Readmore).
- Kenneth Roy, 73, Scottish broadcaster and writer.
- Masanobu Shinozuka, 87, Japanese engineer.
- John Timmer, 87, American politician.
- Peter Tom, 54, Solomon Island politician, MP (since 2006).
- Hugh Wilson, 75, American botanist.
- Bruno Zaremba, 63, French footballer (Valenciennes).

=== 6 ===
- Laurens Anderson, 98, American biochemist.
- Bangkay, 71, Filipino actor.
- Francis Boespflug, 70, French film producer (No Fear, No Die, A Very Long Engagement, High Society).
- Coşkun Büktel, 67, Turkish playwright.
- Fred Burge, 95, Australian footballer (Richmond).
- Jonathan Cantwell, 36, Australian racing cyclist, suicide.
- Cliffs of Moher, 4, Irish Thoroughbred racehorse, euthanised.
- Deng Qidong, 80, Chinese geologist.
- Gavan Disney, 69, Australian television producer (Hey Hey It's Saturday, Healthy, Wealthy and Wise).
- John Eshun, 76, Ghanaian Olympic international footballer (1968, 1972).
- Judson Flint, 61, American football player (Cleveland Browns, New England Patriots, Buffalo Bills).
- Ted Frost, 86, American Olympic rower.
- Tetsuo Gotō, 68, Japanese voice actor (One Piece, Dragon Ball, Death Note), esophageal cancer.
- Kristian Halse, 91, Norwegian politician, MP (1972–1973).
- Devon Johnson, 25, American football player (Carolina Panthers).
- Bernard Landry, 81, Canadian politician, Premier of Quebec (2001–2003).
- Frances M. López-Morillas, 100, American translator of Spanish literature.
- José Lothario, 83, Mexican professional wrestler and manager (NWA, WWF, CWF).
- Ted Mack, 84, Australian politician, MP for North Sydney (1990–1996), NSW MP for North Shore (1981–1988), stroke.
- Hugh McDowell, 65, English cellist (Electric Light Orchestra, Wizzard), cancer.
- Georges Mehdi, 84, French-born Brazilian judoka.
- Dave Morgan, 74, British racing driver, stroke.
- Marjatta Moulin, 91, Finnish Olympic fencer (1960).
- Ina'am Al-Mufti, 89, Jordanian politician, Minister of Social Development (1979–1984).
- Hartman Rector Jr., 94, American general authority of the Church of Jesus Christ of Latter-day Saints.
- Robert Stinnett, 94, American sailor, photographer and author.
- Ian Ward, 90, British physicist.

=== 7 ===
- Hamadjoda Adjoudji, 81, Cameroonian politician.
- José Fortunato Álvarez Valdez, 50, Mexican Roman Catholic prelate, Bishop of Gómez Palacio (since 2015).
- Naomi Blake, 94, Czech-born British sculptor.
- Robert Anthony Brucato, 87, American Roman Catholic prelate, auxiliary bishop (1997–2007) and apostolic administrator (2000) of New York.
- Tony Colacchio, 73, American curler and coach.
- Orlando Corradi, 78, Italian film director and producer.
- Rob Groen, 80, Dutch Olympic rower.
- Friedrich Heimler, 76, German-born Brazilian Roman Catholic prelate, Bishop of Cruz Alta (2002–2014).
- Walt Kowalczyk, 83, American football player (Philadelphia Eagles, Dallas Cowboys, Oakland Raiders).
- Francis Lai, 86, French film score composer (A Man and a Woman, Rider on the Rain, Love Story), Oscar winner (1971).
- Christopher Lehmann-Haupt, 84, Scottish-born American journalist, editor and critic.
- Bob Naegele Jr., 78, American sports team owner (Minnesota Wild).
- Mícheál Ó Súilleabháin, 67, Irish musician and composer.
- Bob Patterson, 86, American college basketball player (Tulsa).
- Oscar Rabin, 90, Russian painter.
- Denise Stillman, 46, American entrepreneur and preservationist (Field of Dreams), liver cancer.
- Alan Watson, 85, British legal scholar.
- Irvin Williams, 92, American gardener (White House).
- Robert Wilmes, 90, French scout leader.
- Xie Shileng, 83, Chinese port and harbor engineer, lymphoma.

=== 8 ===
- Harold Basch, 77, American-born Israeli chemist.
- Bartolomé Bennassar, 89, French historian.
- Stan Clements, 95, English footballer (Southampton).
- Virginia Cole, 71, Irish actress (Tolka Row, The Irish R.M., The Snapper), cancer.
- Bonnie Cooper, 83, American baseball player (All-American Girls Professional Baseball League).
- Max Croci, 50, Italian film director, cancer.
- Bill Dixon, 83, American jazz drummer.
- Don Evenden, 87, Australian rugby footballer.
- Bill Godbout, 79, American computer scientist, founder of CompuPro, house fire.
- Chin Yang Lee, 102, Chinese-born American author (The Flower Drum Song).
- Riccardo Levi-Setti, 91, Italian-born American physicist and professor.
- François N. Macerola, 76, Canadian lawyer and film executive.
- Ron Negray, 88, American baseball player (Philadelphia Phillies).
- Amaliya Panahova, 73, Azerbaijani actress (The Day Passed, Babek), cancer.
- Raymond Plank, 96, American businessman (Apache Corporation).
- Wallace Triplett, 92, American football player (Detroit Lions, Chicago Cardinals), first African-American draftee to play in the NFL.
- Dennis Wrong, 94, Canadian-born American sociologist, heart attack.
- Marvin Zuckerman, 90, American psychologist, cardiac arrest.

=== 9 ===
- Albert Bitran, 87, Turkish-born French painter and sculptor.
- Phyllis Bolds, 86, American physicist.
- Dorothy Cheney, 68, American scientist, breast cancer.
- Richard Paul Conaboy, 93, American judge, District Court Judge for the Middle District of Pennsylvania (1979–1992), heart attack.
- Hiromu Fujii, 83, Japanese baseball player.
- James Greene, 91, American actor (Parks and Recreation, The Days and Nights of Molly Dodd, The Missouri Breaks).
- Ken Howell, 57, American baseball player (Los Angeles Dodgers, Philadelphia Phillies).
- Roger Hoy, 71, English footballer (Tottenham Hotspur, Crystal Palace, Cardiff).
- Roger W. Hunt, 80, American politician, member of the South Dakota House of Representatives (1991–2000, 2005–2012, 2015–2017), complications from surgery.
- Dražen Janković, 52–53, Serbian musician, heart attack.
- Roland Mahauden, 76, Belgian actor and screenwriter.
- Eleanor Montague, 92, American radiologist.
- Janet Paisley, 70, Scottish writer and poet.
- Lalan Sarang, 79, Indian actress (Samna, Mahek).
- Arthur Smith, 70, American poet.
- Zdzisław Sosnowski, 94, Polish footballer (Polonia Warsaw).
- James Stirling, 65, British physicist, provost of Imperial College London (2013–2018).
- Barre Toelken, 83, American folklorist.
- Robert Urbain, 87, Belgian politician, Minister of State (since 2004).

=== 10 ===
- Ajuma Ameh-Otache, 33, Nigerian footballer (national team).
- Raffaele Baldassarre, 62, Italian politician, MEP (2009–2014), heart attack.
- Joel Barcellos, 81, Brazilian actor (Os Fuzis, My Home is Copacabana, Sagarana: The Duel), stroke.
- Ricardo C. Binns, 72, American corporal.
- Gert Coetzer, 79, South African rugby union and league player (Wakefield Trinity).
- Marián Geišberg, 64, Slovak actor.
- Vanja Ilić, 91, Croatian Olympic swimmer.
- Ron Johnson, 71, American football player (New York Giants, Michigan Wolverines), complications from Alzheimer's disease.
- Liu Xuyi, 105, Chinese historian, stroke.
- Herbert London, 79, American political activist and commentator, complications from heart failure.
- Ian McDougall, 83, Australian geologist and geochemist.
- Liz J. Patterson, 78, American politician, member of the U.S. House of Representatives (1987–1993) and the South Carolina Senate (1980–1987).
- Jan Petránek, 86, Czech journalist, commentator and dissident, Charter 77 signatory, heart failure.
- John Rogers, 57, Canadian-born American businessman, president of San Diego Comic-Con (since 1986), glioblastoma.
- Mahmoud Al-Samra, 95, Jordanian academic and politician, Minister of Culture (1991–1993).
- Arnie Stocks, 91, Canadian football player (Toronto Argonauts, Calgary Stampeders).
- Debra Teare, 63, American artist.
- Jeanette Vogelbacher, 96, French Olympic gymnast.
- Marc Wilmet, 80, Belgian linguist.

=== 11 ===
- Pedro Aranda-Díaz Muñoz, 85, Mexican Roman Catholic prelate, Archbishop of Tulancingo (1975–2008).
- Norman Carlberg, 90, American sculptor and photographer.
- Dominic Carmon, 87, American Roman Catholic prelate, Auxiliary Bishop of New Orleans (1993–2006).
- Jerry Gant, 56, American visual artist and poet, liver cancer.
- Shakti Gawain, 70, American author, complications from hip surgery.
- Olga Harmony, 90, Mexican playwright.
- Wayne Maunder, 80, Canadian-born American actor (Custer, Lancer, Porky's), cardiovascular disease.
- Donald McCaig, 78, American writer (Rhett Butler's People), chronic obstructive pulmonary disease and heart disease.
- Alun Morgan, 90, Welsh jazz critic.
- Sailendu Nath Phukan, 81, Indian judge.
- Douglas Rain, 90, Canadian actor (2001: A Space Odyssey).
- Frankie Schneider, 92, American racing driver.
- Bill Scripture, 76, American baseball player and manager.
- Najaf Abbas Sial, 59, Pakistani politician, member of the National Assembly (2013–2018).
- Hiroyuki Sonoda, 76, Japanese politician, MP (since 1986), pneumonia.
- Murray Sullivan, 93, Canadian football player (Toronto Argonauts).
- Zeng Shiqiang, 84, Taiwanese sinologist.

=== 12 ===
- Polly Blodgett, 99, American figure skater.
- John Cairns, 95, British physician and molecular biologist.
- Lowell Cowell, 73, American racing driver.
- D. J. Finney, 101, British statistician.
- Dean Hartle, 87, American politician, member of the Minnesota House of Representatives (1985–1992).
- Roy T. Haverkamp, 93, American diplomat, United States Ambassador to Grenada (1984–1986).
- Kurt Kaiser, 83, American composer.
- Yoshito Kajiya, 80, Japanese politician, member of the House of Councillors (since 2001), heart failure.
- Ananth Kumar, 59, Indian politician, Minister of Parliamentary Affairs (since 2016), Chemicals and Fertilizers (since 2014) and Civil Aviation (1998–1999), lung cancer.
- Lee Min-hye, 33, South Korean Olympic racing cyclist (2008, 2012), Asian Games winner (2010), leukemia.
- Stan Lee, 95, American comic book writer and publisher (Marvel Comics), heart and respiratory failure.
- Igor Luchenok, 80, Belarusian composer, People's Artist of the USSR and Belarus.
- Gloria Manon, 78, American actress (Willy Wonka & the Chocolate Factory, Sly 2: Band of Thieves).
- Ibrahim Salem Mohammedin, 97, Egyptian engineer and industrialist, Minister of Industry (1973–1974).
- Maryse Morandini, 85, French Olympic swimmer (1952).
- Fred Patten, 77, American novelist and historian.
- David Pearson, 83, American Hall of Fame racing driver (NASCAR).
- Toivo Topias Pohjala, 87, Finnish politician, Minister of Agriculture and Forestry (1987–1991).
- Stuart H. Walker, 95, American Olympic yachtsman (1968) and writer, stomach cancer.
- Wang Junmin, 63, Chinese politician, Vice-Governor of Shandong (2002–2012).

=== 13 ===
- Sir John Anderson, 73, New Zealand banker (ANZ Bank New Zealand), broadcast executive (TVNZ) and sport administrator (New Zealand Cricket).
- Johan Asplund, 81, Swedish sociologist.
- Robert C. Atchley, 79, American gerontologist and sociologist.
- Anne Pomeroy Autor, 83, Canadian biochemist.
- Fred Berry, 68, American politician, member of the Massachusetts Senate (1983–2013).
- Ronald P. Dore, 93, British sociologist.
- Susan M. Ervin-Tripp, 91, American linguist, complications from an infected wound.
- Richard Fremantle, 82, American art historian.
- Lucho Gatica, 90, Chilean bolero singer and actor.
- Jene Golovchenko, 72, American physicist.
- Caroline Rose Hunt, 95, American heiress, hotelier (Rosewood Hotels & Resorts), and philanthropist, stroke.
- Marcella Jeandeau, 90, Italian Olympic sprinter (1948).
- Everett Kelly, 92, American politician, Member of the Florida House of Representatives (1978–2000).
- Josephine Klein, 92, German-born British psychologist.
- Phyllis Lamphere, 96, American politician and civic activist.
- Floyd Lloyd, 70, Jamaican reggae musician.
- Katherine MacGregor, 93, American actress (Little House on the Prairie).
- William R. Maloney, 89, American lieutenant general.
- John Meadows III, 74, American politician, member of the Georgia House of Representatives (since 2004), stomach cancer.
- William Mullan, 90, Scottish football referee.
- Ken Narita, 73, Japanese singer, pneumonia.
- Daniel Puckel, 85, American Olympic sport shooter (1960).
- Charles Sargent, 73, American politician, member of the Tennessee House of Representatives (since 1997), cancer.
- Leon Stokesbury, 72, American poet.
- David Stewart, 71, Scottish footballer (Ayr United, Leeds United, national team).
- Jean-Claude Thomas, 68, French politician, Deputy (1988–2012).
- Kalevi Viskari, 90, Finnish artistic gymnast, Olympic bronze medallist (1952).
- John Wilson, 75, British angler, stroke.

=== 14 ===
- Ben Atchley, 88, American politician, member of the Tennessee House of Representatives (1972–1976) and Senate (1977–2005).
- Raymond Arritt, 61, American agronomist, stroke.
- Allen Boren, 84, American football player and coach.
- Camilo Catrillanca, 24, Chilean indigenous activist, shot.
- Sir Sze-yuen Chung, 101, Hong Kong politician, Senior Unofficial Member of Legislative Council (1974–1978) and Executive Council (1980–1988).
- Prabhat Nalini Das, 91, Indian academic.
- Aníbal González Irizarry, 91, Puerto Rican journalist and broadcaster.
- Morten Grunwald, 83, Danish actor (Olsen Gang) and director, thyroid cancer.
- James V. Hansen, 86, American politician, member of the U.S. House of Representatives from Utah's 1st congressional district (1981–2003).
- Walter Haverhals, 70, Belgian Olympic sailor.
- Rolf Hoppe, 87, German actor (I Was Nineteen, Tři oříšky pro Popelku, Mephisto).
- Francisco Molina, 88, Spanish-Chilean football player (Atlético Madrid, Audax Italiano) and manager (Deportes Antofagasta).
- Fernando del Paso, 83, Mexican novelist and poet.
- Fritz Rohrlich, 97, American theoretical physicist.
- Masahiro Sayama, 64, Japanese jazz pianist.
- Tim Stockdale, 54, British equestrian, stomach cancer.
- Mario Suárez, 92, Venezuelan folk singer.
- Gottfried Weilenmann, 98, Swiss racing cyclist, Tour de Suisse winner (1949).
- Howard Weyers, 84, American football player and coach (Michigan State Spartans).
- Mark Wolfson, 84, British politician, MP for Sevenoaks (1979–1997).
- Douglas Wright, 62, New Zealand dancer and choreographer, cancer.
- George Yardley, 76, Scottish footballer (East Fife, Tranmere Rovers).

=== 15 ===
- Anthony Toruariki Armstrong, 61, Cook Islands politician.
- Ba Zhongtan, 88, Chinese lieutenant general, commander of the People's Armed Police (1992–1996).
- Edwin Beckett, 81, British army general.
- E. D. Blodgett, 83, Canadian poet and translator.
- John Bluthal, 89, Polish-born British-Australian actor (Never Mind the Quality, Feel the Width, The Vicar of Dibley, Hail, Caesar!).
- Nancy Cappello, 66, American breast cancer activist, Clostridioides difficile infection.
- Anne Carroll, 78, British actress (Bellman and True, Coldblooded, K-PAX).
- Roy Clark, 85, American Hall of Fame country singer and television host (Hee Haw), complications from pneumonia.
- Aethelred Eldridge, 88, American artist.
- Nick Eyre, 59, American football player (Houston Oilers).
- Takayuki Fujikawa, 56, Japanese footballer (Verdy Kawasaki), stomach cancer.
- Irv Gordon, 78, American retired teacher, known for driving his 1966 Volvo P1800 more than 3.2 million miles.
- E. S. Raja Gopal, 82, Indian condensed matter physicist.
- Adolf Grünbaum, 95, German-American philosopher.
- Kacem Kefi, 73, Tunisian composer and singer.
- Sonny Knowles, 86, Irish singer.
- Zhores Medvedev, 93, Russian agronomist, biologist and dissident.
- Seiji Nakamura, 87, Japanese politician, MP (1983-1986, 1990-2009).
- Mike Noble, 88, British comic artist and illustrator (Fireball XL5).
- Jan Persson, 75, Danish photographer, cancer.
- Kim Porter, 47, American model and actress (Wicked Wicked Games), lobar pneumonia.
- Najim al-Radwan, 46, Saudi Arabian Olympic weightlifter.
- Luigi Rossi di Montelera, 72, Italian businessman (Martini & Rossi) and politician, Deputy (1976–1992), heart attack.
- Aldyr Schlee, 83, Brazilian writer and illustrator, designer of football national team jersey.
- Ivan Smirnov, 63, Russian composer and guitarist.
- Sigmund Steinnes, 59, Norwegian politician, cancer.
- Ann Symonds, 79, Australian politician, member of the New South Wales Legislative Council (1982–1998).
- Lubomir Tomaszewski, 95, Polish-American artist.
- Jane Wenham, 90, English actress (An Inspector Calls, Testament of Youth).
- Yves Yersin, 76, Swiss film director (Les petites fugues).
- Zhang Ting, 96, Chinese politician, Minister of the Electronics Industry (1982–1983).

=== 16 ===
- Hatem Ben Rabah, 47, Tunisian actor.
- Andrew Burt, 73, British actor (Emmerdale Farm).
- Francisco Calvo Serraller, 70, Spanish art historian.
- George A. Cooper, 93, British actor (Tom Jones, Coronation Street, Grange Hill).
- Scott English, 81, American songwriter ("Brandy") and record producer.
- Paul Ferris, 89, British author and journalist.
- Pablo Ferro, 83, Cuban-born American graphic designer, complications from pneumonia.
- Alec Finn, 74, English-born Irish bouzouki player (De Dannan).
- William Goldman, 87, American author (The Princess Bride) and screenwriter (Butch Cassidy and the Sundance Kid, All the President's Men), Oscar winner (1970, 1977), complications from colon cancer and pneumonia.
- Irwin Hollander, 90, American artist and printmaker.
- Al James, 72, British bassist (Showaddywaddy), complications from injuries sustained in fall.
- Jerry Miller, 80, American racing driver.
- Jeanne Mockford, 92, English actress (Up Pompeii!, Fourplay, Hellboy II: The Golden Army), dementia.
- Flemming Nielsen, 84, Danish footballer (Atalanta, Greenock Morton, national team).
- Gerry O'Malley, 90, Canadian politician, MLA (1988–1998).
- John Poyner, 85, British sound editor (The Dirty Dozen, An American Werewolf in London, Thelma & Louise), Oscar winner (1968).
- Augusto Premoli, 92, Argentine Olympic pentathlete.
- Bunny Sterling, 70, Jamaican-born British boxer, European middleweight champion (1976), dementia.
- Nick Testa, 90, American baseball player (San Francisco Giants).
- Hiromasa Yonekura, 81, Japanese businessman, CEO of Sumitomo Chemical.

=== 17 ===
- Richard Baker, 93, English broadcaster (BBC News, Start the Week, Melodies for You).
- Les Beasley, 90, American southern gospel singer.
- Gene Berce, 91, American basketball player (Oshkosh All-Stars, Tri-Cities Blackhawks).
- Barrie Betts, 86, English footballer (Manchester City, Scunthorpe United, Stockport County).
- Thomas Bowman Brewer, 86, American academic administrator.
- Jens Büchner, 49, German singer (Ich bin ein Star – Holt mich hier raus!), lung cancer.
- John R. Campbell, 85, American dairy scientist and academic administrator.
- Kuldip Singh Chandpuri, 77, Indian military officer, commander in the Battle of Longewala.
- Cheng Kaijia, 100, Chinese nuclear physicist and engineer.
- Peter Arthur Cox, 96, British civil engineer.
- Frances Taylor Davis, 89, American dancer and actress.
- Kayo Dottley, 90, American football player (Chicago Bears).
- Jim Dressler, 86, American politician.
- Eduard von Falz-Fein, 106, Russian-born Liechtensteiner businessman, journalist and sportsman, house fire.
- Jerry Frankel, 88, American theater and film producer.
- Jim Iley, 82, English football player (Sheffield United, Nottingham Forest) and manager (Barnsley).
- Motohiko Kondo, 64, Japanese politician, MP (since 2000), sepsis.
- Banamali Maharana, 77, Indian percussionist.
- Margaret McBurney, 87, Canadian writer and activist.
- Mark Meseroll, 63, American football player (New Orleans Saints).
- Iain Moireach, 80, Scottish Gaelic writer.
- Teruaki Mukaiyama, 91, Japanese organic chemist.
- Juan Olabarri, 82, Spanish Olympic sailor.
- Alyque Padamsee, 87, Indian actor (Gandhi) and adman.
- Cyril Pahinui, 68, American slack-key guitarist and singer.
- Ajin Panjapan, 91, Thai writer.
- Mary Pete, 61, American anthropologist and educator, complications from ovarian cancer.
- Gerald Skinner, 64, American football player (Green Bay Packers), heart attack.
- Mary Kay Stearns, 93, American actress.
- Metin Türel, 83, Turkish football player (PTT, İstanbulspor) and manager (national team).

=== 18 ===
- Ethel Ayler, 88, American actress (To Sleep with Anger, The Bodyguard, The Cosby Show).
- Héctor Beltrán Leyva, 56, Mexican drug cartel leader (Beltrán-Leyva Cartel), heart attack.
- Waldyr Boccardo, 82, Brazilian basketball player, world champion (1959) and Olympic bronze medalist (1960).
- Klaus Bockisch, 79, German footballer (SC Preußen Münster, FC 08 Villingen).
- Ed Evanko, 80, Canadian singer and actor (Sudden Death, Double Jeopardy), stroke.
- Jean Fassler, 99, American politician.
- Weeshie Fogarty, 77, Irish Gaelic footballer and sports broadcaster (Radio Kerry).
- Walter S. Gibson, 85–86, American art historian.
- John Mantle, 76, Welsh rugby union (Newport) and league player (St Helens, Great Britain).
- John MacBrien, 93, Canadian Olympic sailor.
- Eiichi Nakao, 88, Japanese politician, Minister of International Trade and Industry (1990–1991).
- Peter Peryer, 77, New Zealand photographer.
- John Pierson, 81, American journalist.
- Eddie Reeves, 79, American songwriter ("All I Ever Need Is You") and record label executive (Warner Bros. Records), stroke.
- Jennie Stoller, 72, British actress (The Good Father, Sapphire & Steel, King Ralph), cancer.
- Muhammad Abdul Wahhab, 95, Pakistani Islamic cleric, Amir of Tablighi Jamaat (since 1992), dengue fever.
- Uladzimir Zhuravel, 47, Belarusian football player (Dinamo Minsk, national team) and manager (Dynamo Brest).

=== 19 ===
- James Aggrey-Orleans, 81, Ghanaian diplomat, High Commissioner to the United Kingdom (1997–2001).
- Georges Benedetti, 88, French doctor and politician, Deputy (1981–1986, 1988–1993) and Senator (1986–1988).
- Dominique Blanchar, 91, French actress (Le Secret de Mayerling, The Song of Sister Maria, L'Avventura).
- Tosyn Bucknor, 37, Nigerian radio and television presenter, sickle cell anaemia.
- Bill Caddick, 74, English folk singer and guitarist.
- Pablo Cedano Cedano, 82, Dominican Roman Catholic prelate, Auxiliary Bishop of Santo Domingo (1996–2013).
- Neil Collins, 77, New Zealand broadcaster (4ZB, Radio Dunedin) and politician (Dunedin City Council).
- Alfred Evers, 83, Belgian politician.
- Apisai Ielemia, 63, Tuvaluan politician, Prime Minister (2006–2010).
- Sir Donald Irvine, 83, British general practitioner.
- Dan Maloney, 68, Canadian ice hockey player (Toronto Maple Leafs, Los Angeles Kings) and coach (Winnipeg Jets).
- Léopold Marien, 84, Belgian Olympic decathlete.
- Larry Pickering, 76, Australian political cartoonist, lung cancer.
- Larry Pierce, 68, American country singer and comedian, heart attack.
- Eva Probst, 88, German actress (I Lost My Heart in Heidelberg, Prosecutor Corda, Son Without a Home).
- Alí Rodríguez Araque, 81, Venezuelan politician and diplomat, Minister of Foreign Affairs (2004–2006) and Finance (2008–2010), ambassador to Cuba (since 2014).
- Shiao Yi, 83, Taiwanese-American wuxia novelist.
- Michael Sichel, 84, Australian Olympic fencer.
- Witold Sobociński, 89, Polish cinematographer (The Adventures of Gerard, The Hourglass Sanatorium, Frantic) and academic.
- Andrew Varley, 83, American politician.
- Wu Jianchang, 79, Chinese engineer and politician, Vice-Minister of Metallurgical Industry (1997–1998).

=== 20 ===
- Yusif Abubakar, 60, Ghanaian football manager (Medeama, Berekum Chelsea, Hearts of Oak).
- Levine Andrade, 64, Indian-born British violinist, heart attack.
- Roy Bailey, 83, English folk singer.
- Cyril Belshaw, 96, New-Zealand-born Canadian anthropologist.
- James H. Billington, 89, American academic, Librarian of Congress (1987–2015), pneumonia.
- Robert Blythe, 71, Welsh actor (High Hopes, Whoops Apocalypse, Rebecca's Daughters).
- Eddie C. Campbell, 79, American blues musician, complications from a stroke.
- Mac Collins, 74, American politician, member of the U.S. House of Representatives from Georgia's 8th district (1993–2005).
- Shlomo Erell, 98, Israeli military general, Commander of the Navy (1966–1968).
- Anvar Khamei, 101, Iranian sociologist, economist and journalist, respiratory failure.
- Sir Aaron Klug, 92, Lithuanian-born British chemist and biophysicist, Nobel Prize winner (1982).
- Henry Metzger, 86, German-born American immunologist.
- Monet's Garden, 20, Irish racehorse, euthanized.
- Gordon Morritt, 76, English footballer (Rotherham United, Doncaster Rovers, York City).
- Eimuntas Nekrošius, 65, Lithuanian stage director and actor (The Corridor), heart attack.
- Mildred Persinger, 100, American feminist.
- Dietmar Schwager, 78, German footballer (1. FC Kaiserslautern).
- Monica Sims, 93, British broadcasting executive.
- Wayne Stayskal, 86, American cartoonist, complications from Alzheimer's disease.
- Robert W. Thomson, 84, British professor of Armenian studies.
- Bruno Veselica, 82, Croatian footballer (Rijeka).

=== 21 ===
- Emmanuel Kwabena Kyeremateng Agyarko, 60, Ghanaian politician, MP (since 2012).
- Meena Alexander, 67, Indian-born American poet, writer and scholar, endometrial serous cancer.
- Mamane Barka, 59, Nigerien musician.
- Ben Caraher, 80, Northern Irish politician.
- Michele Carey, 75, American actress (El Dorado, Live a Little, Love a Little).
- Evaristo Marc Chengula, 77, Tanzanian Roman Catholic prelate, Bishop of Mbeya (since 1996).
- Angelica Cob-Baehler, 47, American music industry executive, cancer.
- Giuseppe Dante, 87, Italian cyclist.
- Victoria Donohoe, 89, American artist and art critic.
- Dean Gitter, 83, American entrepreneur and real estate developer.
- Rodney Green, 79, English footballer (Halifax Town), complications from dementia.
- Olivia Hooker, 103, American psychologist and yeoman, first African-American woman in the U.S. Coast Guard, last survivor of the Tulsa race massacre.
- Igor Korobov, 62, Russian intelligence officer, Director of the Main Intelligence Directorate (since 2016).
- Sara Larkin, 71, American painter.
- Lau Nai-keung, 71, Hong Kong academic, businessman, and politician, cancer.
- Jan-Lauritz Opstad, 68, Norwegian art historian and museum director.
- Francisco de Paula Victor, 83, Brazilian Roman Catholic prelate, Bishop of Turres in Numidia (since 1996) and Auxiliary Bishop of Brasília (1996–2011).
- Jose Peralta, 47, American politician, member of the New York Senate (since 2010), septic shock.
- Gianfranco Rastrelli, 86, Italian politician, Deputy (1994–1996).
- Fahmida Riaz, 72, Pakistani poet, writer and activist.
- M. I. Shanavas, 67, Indian politician, MP (since 2009), complications from liver transplant.
- Edward Timms, 81, British academic.
- Robert Weber, 76, American engineer.

=== 22 ===
- Soslan Andiyev, 66, Russian freestyle wrestler, Olympic champion (1976, 1980).
- Lawrence C. Becker, 79, American philosopher.
- Gerald Berenson, 96, American cardiologist.
- Len Campbell, 71, Scottish footballer (Dumbarton).
- William J. Conklin, 95, American architect and archaeologist.
- Andrzej Fischer, 66, Polish footballer.
- Jacqueline Hassink, 52, Dutch photographer.
- Betty Jaynes, 97, American actress (Babes in Arms, Meet the People, I Love Lucy).
- Imrat Khan, 83, Indian sitar player, stroke.
- Yu-chien Kuan, 87, Chinese-born German defector, sinologist and writer, cancer.
- Nicolae Mihalcea, 96, Romanian Olympic equestrian (1952, 1956).
- Willie Naulls, 84, American basketball player (UCLA, New York Knicks, Boston Celtics).
- Baishnab Charan Parida, 77, Indian politician, MP (2010–2016), cancer.
- Carrie Saxon Perry, 87, American politician, Mayor of Hartford, Connecticut (1987–1993), heart attack.
- Richard Philippe, 28, French racing driver, helicopter crash.
- Albert Ritzenberg, 100, American tennis player and coach.
- Judith Rodriguez, 82, Australian poet.
- Júlio Santos, 82, Portuguese Olympic decathlete.

=== 23 ===
- Kevin Austin, 45, English footballer (Lincoln City, Swansea City, Trinidad and Tobago national team), pancreatic cancer.
- Mariano Bellver, 92, Spanish art patron.
- Betty Bumpers, 93, American childhood immunizations activist, First Lady of Arkansas (1971–1975), complications from dementia and a broken hip.
- Menahem Degani, 91, Israeli Olympic basketball player (1952).
- Raed Fares, 46, Syrian anti-government activist, shot.
- Bernard Gauthier, 94, French road racing cyclist.
- Bujor Hălmăgeanu, 77, Romanian football player (Steaua București, national team) and manager (Dacia Unirea Brăila), respiratory failure.
- Alex Jupp, 91, Canadian politician.
- Mick McGeough, 62, Canadian ice hockey referee, stroke.
- Loretta McLaughlin, 90, American journalist (Boston Record American).
- Bob McNair, 81, American businessman and sports club owner (Houston Texans), cancer.
- Sandeep Michael, 33, Indian field hockey player, brain disease.
- Stan Perron, 96, Australian businessman.
- Jean-Loup Rivière, 70, French playwright.
- Nicolas Roeg, 90, English film director (Don't Look Now, The Man Who Fell to Earth) and cinematographer (A Funny Thing Happened on the Way to the Forum).
- Freddie Stockdale, 71, English opera impresario, bowel cancer.
- Michael E. Thomas, 81, American academic administrator.
- George Ty, 86, Hong Kong-born Filipino banker, founder of Metrobank, pancreatic cancer.
- Gerard Unger, 76, Dutch graphic and type designer.

=== 24 ===
- Ambareesh, 66, Indian Kannada actor (Naagarahaavu, Paduvaaralli Pandavaru) and politician, MP (1998–2009), heart attack.
- Helena Anhava, 93, Finnish poet, author and translator.
- Enrique Bernales Ballesteros, 78, Peruvian politician, Senator (1980–1992), UN Special Rapporteur on mercenaries (1987–2004) and member of PCA (since 2013), cancer.
- Vincent A. Biancucci, 78, American politician.
- Allan Boardman, 81, British physicist.
- David Conville, 89, British actor (Surgical Spirit).
- Gordon Copeland, 75, New Zealand politician, MP (2002–2008).
- Lou Cvijanovich, 92, American basketball coach (Santa Clara High School).
- David Defiagbon, 48, Nigerian-Canadian boxer, Olympic silver medalist (1996), heart attack.
- Walt Dziedzic, 85, American politician.
- Harold Farberman, 89, American conductor.
- Saida Gunba, 59, Georgian javelin thrower, Olympic silver medalist (1980).
- Ray Hill, 78, American LGBT activist, heart failure.
- I Want Revenge, 12, American Thoroughbred racehorse, virus.
- Rune Jansson, 86, Swedish Greco-Roman wrestler, Olympic bronze medalist (1956).
- Ricky Jay, 72, American stage magician and actor (Tomorrow Never Dies, Magnolia, Deadwood).
- Sy Kattelson, 95, American photographer.
- Gene Leedy, 90, American architect.
- Robert C. Morlino, 71, American Roman Catholic prelate, Bishop of Madison (since 2003), heart attack.
- Ikeogu Oke, 51, Nigerian poet and journalist.
- José Panizo, 82, Spanish Olympic wrestler (1960, 1964).
- Fred Quayle, 82, American politician, member of the Virginia Senate (1992–2012).
- Věra Růžičková, 90, Czech gymnast, Olympic champion (1948).
- Shi Jiaonai, 97, Chinese plant physiologist, member of the Chinese Academy of Sciences.
- Amanda Swimmer, 97, American Cherokee potter.
- Daniel Thiaw, 81, Senegalese Olympic sprinter.
- Wycliffe D. Toole Jr., 91, American rear admiral.

=== 25 ===
- Jacques Baudin, 79, Senegalese politician, Foreign Minister (1998–2000).
- Randolph L. Braham, 95, Romanian-born American historian and political scientist.
- Daphne Bugental, 90, American psychologist.
- Dennis D. Buss, 76, American electrical engineer.
- Giuliana Calandra, 82, Italian actress (La calandria, Deep Red, L'affittacamere).
- Paul Ellingworth, 87, British biblical scholar.
- Dinny Flanagan, 88, Canadian ice hockey player (Lethbridge Maple Leafs), world champion (1951).
- Roger Hamelin, 77, Canadian football player (Winnipeg Blue Bombers).
- Tony Hanson, 63, American basketball player (Connecticut Huskies) and coach (Tees Valley Mohawks), heart attack.
- Viktor Kanevskyi, 82, Ukrainian football player (Dynamo Kyiv, national team) and manager (Dynamo Kharkiv).
- Gloria Katz, 76, American screenwriter and film producer (American Graffiti, Indiana Jones and the Temple of Doom, Howard the Duck), ovarian cancer.
- Wright King, 95, American actor (A Streetcar Named Desire, Stagecoach to Fury, Planet of the Apes).
- Willard Kinzie, 99, Canadian businessman and politician, Mayor of Barrie (1957–1961).
- Łukasz Kwiatkowski, 36, Polish Olympic track cyclist (2004, 2008), leukemia.
- Moncef Lazaâr, 76, Tunisian actor and screenwriter.
- Norio Maeda, 83, Japanese composer and pianist.
- Larry Matysik, 72, American professional wrestling commentator and author.
- Claude Péloquin, 76, Canadian poet, cancer.
- Darren Pitcher, 49, English footballer (Charlton Athletic, Crystal Palace).
- Jane Richardson, 98, American author.
- C. K. Jaffer Sharief, 85, Indian politician, Minister of Railways (1991–1995).
- Shep Shepherd, 101, American jazz musician.
- Sinndar, 21, Irish racehorse. (death announced on this date)
- Graham Williams, 81, Welsh footballer (Everton, Swansea Town, Tranmere Rovers).

=== 26 ===
- Bernardo Bertolucci, 77, Italian film director (Last Tango in Paris, The Last Emperor, 1900), Oscar winner (1988), lung cancer.
- Umberto Borsò, 95, Italian opera singer.
- Luc Deflo, 60, Belgian writer.
- Mark Farrell, 65, British tennis player.
- Said Ghabrial, 79, Egyptian-American plant pathologist.
- Stanislav Gorkovenko, 80, Russian conductor.
- Samuel Hadida, 64, Moroccan-born French film distributor and producer (True Romance, Resident Evil, Silent Hill).
- Johnny Hart, 90, English football player and manager (Manchester City), dementia.
- Suse Heinze, 98, German Olympic diver.
- Stephen Hillenburg, 57, American animator (SpongeBob SquarePants, Rocko's Modern Life) and marine biologist, amyotrophic lateral sclerosis.
- Wally Hinshelwood, 89, English footballer (Fulham, Reading, Bristol City).
- Sir Charles Huxtable, 87, British military officer, Commander-in-Chief, Land Forces (1988–1990).
- Bonita Mabo, 75, Australian educator and indigenous activist.
- Iravatham Mahadevan, 88, Indian scholar and civil servant.
- Tomás Maldonado, 96, Argentine painter and designer.
- Howard Petch, 93, Canadian academic administrator.
- Patricia Quintana, 72, Mexican chef, writer and academic.
- Norm Rauhaus, 83, Canadian football player (Winnipeg Blue Bombers).
- Paul Leslie Redfearn, 92, American bryologist.
- Leo Schwarz, 87, German Roman Catholic prelate, Auxiliary Bishop of Trier (1982–2006).
- Jean Barker, Baroness Trumpington, 96, British politician and socialite, member of the House of Lords (1980–2017).
- Lee Weiss, 89–90, American painter.

=== 27 ===
- Boris Aristov, 93, Russian politician, Soviet Ambassador to Finland (1988–1992) and Poland (1978–1983), Soviet Minister of Foreign Trade (1985–1988).
- Mohammed Aziz, 64, Indian playback singer, heart attack.
- Sultan Al-Bargan, 35, Saudi footballer (Al-Hilal, Al-Ettifaq, Al-Raed), complications from a stroke.
- Janet Cox-Rearick, 88, American art historian.
- Ed Galigher, 68, American football player (New York Jets, San Francisco 49ers), complications following lung transplant surgery.
- Benjamín Gallegos Soto, 58, Mexican pilot and politician, Deputy (1997–2000) and Senator (2000–2006), heart attack.
- Ken Johannson, 88, Canadian-born American ice hockey player and coach.
- Harold O. Levy, 65, American lawyer and philanthropist, New York City School Chancellor (2000–2002), amyotrophic lateral sclerosis.
- Medardo Luis Luzardo Romero, 83, Venezuelan Roman Catholic prelate, Archbishop of Ciudad Bolívar (1986–2011).
- Johnny Maddox, 91, American pianist and historian.
- Ed Pastor, 75, American politician, member of the U.S. House of Representatives from Arizona's 2nd, 4th, and 7th districts (1991–2015), heart attack.
- H. S. Prakash, 67, Indian politician, MLA (1994–1999, 2004–2007, since 2008).
- V. K. Rao, 104, Indian civil servant, Principal Secretary to the President (1981–1982).
- Leo P. Ribuffo, 73, American historian.
- Armando Rueda, 89, Mexican Olympic weightlifter.
- Goran Stefanovski, 66, Macedonian playwright.
- Mahito Tsujimura, 88, Japanese actor and voice actor (Patlabor: The Movie).
- Jesse Turnbow, 62, American football player (Cleveland Browns).
- Barbara Brooks Wallace, 95, American author, complications from pneumonia.
- John Wulp, 90, American scenic designer and stage director (Dracula), Tony winner (1978).

=== 28 ===
- Robert Aiello, 81, American author (The Deceivers, Shadow in the Mirror).
- Antonio Almada, 87, Mexican Olympic pentathlete and fencer.
- Thomas J. J. Altizer, 91, American theologian, stroke.
- Nicanor de Carvalho, 71, Brazilian football manager (Paulista, Ponte Preta, Shonan Bellmare), heart attack.
- Sam Foose, 84, American automobile customizer, cancer.
- Anthony Frew, 63, British physician.
- Joyce Friedman, 90, American mathematician.
- Richard Fulton, 91, American politician, member of the U.S. House of Representatives from Tennessee's 5th district (1963–1975), Mayor of Nashville (1975–1987).
- Gary Haisman, 60, English musician.
- Wayne Jim, 57, Canadian politician.
- Masahiko Katsuya, 57, Japanese columnist and photographer, alcoholic hepatitis.
- Andrea Milani, 70, Italian mathematician and astronomer.
- Robert Morris, 87, American sculptor, pneumonia.
- Roger Neumann, 77, American jazz saxophonist.
- Kōichirō Nishikawa, 79, Japanese physicist.
- Zulkifli Nurdin, 70, Indonesian politician, Governor of Jambi (1999–2004, 2005–2010).
- P-64, 3 or 4, a Los Angeles mountain lion
- Nancy Paterson, 61, Canadian artist and writer.
- Blaže Ristovski, 87, Macedonian linguist and historian.
- Georgie Salter, 67, New Zealand netball player (national team) and coach (Otago Rebels).
- Harry Leslie Smith, 95, British writer and political commentator, pneumonia.

=== 29 ===
- Harue Akagi, 94, Japanese actress (Magic Boy, Bushido, Samurai Saga, Pecoross' Mother and Her Days).
- Gordon Black, 87, Scottish footballer (Falkirk, Dundee, Dumbarton).
- John D. F. Black, 85, American screenwriter (Shaft, Trouble Man) and television producer (Star Trek).
- Elisa Brune, 52, Belgian writer.
- Altaf Fatima, 91, Pakistani novelist and writer.
- Brigitte Gapais-Dumont, 74, French fencer, Olympic silver medalist (1976).
- Eldon George, 87, Canadian fossil hunter and geologist.
- Ruth Haring, 63, American chess player.
- Charles "Chuck" Harrison, 87, American industrial engineer.
- Ralph Hodge, 65, American college basketball coach (Olivet Nazarene).
- Garnik A. Karapetyan, 60, Armenian mathematician and academic.
- Masaru Kawasaki, 94, Japanese conductor and composer.
- Ulrich Leyendecker, 72, German composer.
- Licia Macchini, 88, Italian Olympic artistic gymnast.
- Hans Maier, 102, Dutch Olympic water polo player (1936).
- Viktor Matviyenko, 70, Ukrainian football player (Dynamo Kyiv) and manager, Olympic bronze medalist (1976).
- Christine Muzio, 67, French fencer, Olympic champion (1980).
- Thomas O'Neil, 82, New Zealand cricketer.
- Robert Plotnik, 75, American record store owner, complications from a stroke.
- Miguel Romero Esteo, 88, Spanish writer and playwright.

=== 30 ===
- Jon Ramon Aboitiz, 70, Spanish-Filipino businessman (Aboitiz Equity Ventures).
- Peter Armitage, 79, British actor (Coronation Street, Jack the Ripper, Hearts and Minds), heart attack.
- Harry Barrett, 93, Canadian politician.
- Roger Burton, 90, American actor (Baskets).
- George H. W. Bush, 94, American politician, president (1989–1993), vice president (1981–1989), director of central intelligence (1976–1977), complications from Parkinson's disease.
- Fred Caligiuri, 100, American baseball player (Philadelphia Athletics).
- Chang Guitian, 76, Chinese xiangsheng actor.
- Kirk Cooper, 86, Bermudian Olympic sailor (1964, 1968, 1972).
- Dorothy Drummond, 89, American geographer, complications from a fall.
- Attash Durrani, 66, Pakistani linguist and gemologist.
- Luigi Farace, 84, Italian politician, Deputy (1987–1994) and Mayor of Bari (1978–1981).
- Palden Gyatso, 85, Tibetan Buddhist monk and political prisoner, liver cancer.
- Andreas Janc, 80, Austrian Olympic cross-country skier (1964, 1968).
- Julie Kaatz, Australian cricketer (Queensland), cancer.
- Joseph L. Tauro, 87, American federal judge, United States District Court for the District of Massachusetts (since 1972).
- Harvey Tyson, 90, South African journalist and editor.
- Herbert Woodson, 93, American engineer.
- Cyril Woolford, 91, English rugby league footballer (Castleford, Doncaster, Featherstone Rovers).
