= Hiromu =

- Gender: Both

Origin
- Origin: Japanese
- Meaning: Different meanings depending on the kanji used

Hiromu (written: 弘, 広務, 弥夢, 大夢 or ひろむ in hiragana) is a unisex Japanese given name. Notable people with the name include:

- Hiromu Arakawa (荒川 弘; born 1973), Japanese manga artist
- Hiromu Fujii (藤井 弘; born 1935), Japanese baseball player
- Hiromu Ise (伊勢 大夢; born 1998), Japanese baseball player
- Hiromu Kamada (鎌田 大夢; born 2001), Japanese footballer
- Hiromu Kurokawa (黒川 弘務; born 1957), Japanese prosecutor
- Hiromu Matsuoka (松岡 弘; born 1947), Japanese baseball pitcher
- Hiromu Mineta (峯田 大夢; born 1995), Japanese voice actor
- Hiromu Mitsumaru (三丸 拡; born 1993), Japanese footballer
- Hiromu Murakami (村上 弘; 1921–2007), Japanese politician
- Hiromu Naruse (成瀬 弘; 1944–2010), Japanese test driver and engineer
- Hiromu Nonaka (野中 広務; born 1925–2018), Japanese politician
- Hiromu Ono (小野 弥夢), Japanese manga artist
- Hiromu Sekine (関根 弘; born 1943), Japanese sports shooter
- Hiromu Shinozuka (篠塚 ひろむ; born 1979), Japanese manga artist
- Hiromu Takahashi (高橋 ヒロム; born 1989), Japanese professional wrestler
- Hiromu Tanaka (田中 宏武; born 1999), Japanese footballer
- Hiromu Watanabe (渡辺 大夢; born 1988), Japanese shogi player
- Hiromu Yamauchi (山内 大夢; born 1999), Japanese athlete
