= Robert Weber =

Robert Weber may refer to:

== Politicians ==
- Robert R. Weber (1925–2021), American politician

== Cartoonists ==
- Bob Weber (cartoonist) (1934–2020), creator of the comic strip Moose and Molly
- Robert Weber (cartoonist) (1924–2016), New Yorker cartoonist
- Bob Weber, Jr., cartoonist and creator of the comic strip Slylock Fox

== Scientists and academics ==
- Robert Weber (astronomer) (1926–2008), American astronomer
- Robert Weber (engineer) (1942–2018), American engineer and academic
- Robert J. Weber (born 1947), American academic and educator

== Sportspeople ==
- Bob Weber (American football) (1934–2008), American gridiron football player and coach
- Robert Weber (handballer) (born 1985), Austrian handball player

== See also ==
- Robert Weber Round Barn, Illinois
- Robert Webber (disambiguation)
