= Robert Webber (disambiguation) =

Robert Webber (1924–1989) was an American actor.

Robert Webber may also refer to:

- Robert E. Webber (1933–2007), American theologian
- Rob Webber (born 1986), rugby union player

== See also ==
- Robert Weber (disambiguation)
