= Josephine Klein =

German-born British psychologist and psychotherapist (1926-2018)

- Born: 17 October 1926; Dusseldorf, Germany
- Died: 13 November 2018 (aged 92)
- Education: University of London; London School of Economics; Birmingham University
- Occupations: Psychologist and psychotherapist

Josephine Faniella Henny Klein (17 October 1926 – 13 November 2018), was a German-born British psychologist and psychotherapist. She was a Jewish Holocaust survivor and, in addition to her professional activities, established several community programs supporting and sheltering young people, including those escaping physical and sexual abuse.

== Biography ==
She was born in Dusseldorf, Germany, into a secular Jewish family with a German father and a Dutch mother. They were living in Amsterdam, Holland, when Nazi troops invaded their country in 1940, and they made their escape by boat four days later. Many of her family members who could not flee Europe did not survive the Holocaust.

When they were rescued at sea by the HMS Malcolm, a Royal Navy destroyer, the family was barely conscious and taken to a hospital in Maidstone, Kent, England. Once recovered, they made plans to emigrate to America but could not acquire the necessary visas. They chose instead to live in Chester, where Josephine attended the Queen’s school and was offered a scholarship to study at University of London. She pursued a double academic program, gaining a BA in French at University of London and a first class in Sociology at London School of Economics.

Klein received her PhD at Birmingham University, and lectured there in social studies from 1949 to 1962. She then worked as a research fellow at Nuffield College, Oxford for three years, and was a Reader in Social Relations at University of Sussex for five years until 1970. While living in Brighton during the mid-1960s, she initiated a program called Archway Venture, to help support and shelter counterculture youth, and later expanded its services to include those escaping conflict, physical and sexual abuse. She also founded a course on youth and community work at Goldsmiths’ College, and went on to serve as course director for four years.

She published several books: The study of groups and working with groups, which offered a practical guide in youth and community work and in psychotherapy. A later book, Samples from English Cultures analysed post-war social changes and the upbringing of children.

After retirement, she still supervised trainee psychotherapists. Klein never married and died on 13 November 2018 at 92.
