= Gerald Berenson =

American cardiologist (1922–2018)

- Born: Gerald Sanders Berenson; September 19, 1922
- Died: November 22, 2018 (aged 96)
- Occupation: Cardiologist

Academic background
- Education: Tulane University

Gerald Sanders Berenson (September 19, 1922 – November 22, 2018) was an American cardiologist, heart researcher, and public health specialist who specialized in researching the causes of heart diseases. Berenson's fundamental research revealed that adult heart disease arises from practices and behaviors that begin in childhood. He also discovered that atherosclerosis was significantly more pronounced in individuals who had three or four cardiovascular risk factors compared to those who had none.

== Early life and education ==
Berenson was born into a family of Polish Jewish descent in Bogalusa, Louisiana, on September 19, 1922 to Meyer Berenson and Eva Singerman Berenson, who operated several businesses, including The State Theater and Berenson's Clothing Store. He had two older siblings, Sara Berenson Stone and Byrde Berenson Haspel.

Berenson completed his bachelor's in science from Tulane University in 1943. He received his medical degree from Tulane in 1945. He then served as a doctor in the US Navy from 1945 to 1948.

== Career ==
Following his discharge from the U.S. Navy in 1948, he taught at Tulane University until 1952.

From 1952 to 1954, Berenson was then a research fellow at the University of Chicago, studying under the direction of the pediatric department chairman Albert Dorfman, with whom he conducted studies of rheumatic fever.

Upon the completion of his fellowship In 1954, Berenson joined Louisiana State University's medical school in New Orleans as an Assistant Professor in the department of medicine. In 1958 he was promoted to Associate Professor. In 1962, he was elected as a fellow of the American College of Physicians. In 1963, he was promoted to full professor. In 1964, he was elected a fellow of the American College of Cardiologists. In the same year, he published research about racial disparities in glycoproteins in the human aorta. In 1966, he served as president of the New Orleans Academy of Internal Medicine. in 1971, he served as president of the Louisiana affiliate of the American Heart Association.

In 1972, as a professor of cardiology at Louisiana State University School of Medicine, he started the Bogalusa Heart Study, and it ran for four decades. The study was named for the community in southern Louisiana where it took place (and where Berenson was born and raised). It was the only long-term study of heart disease in a single community with a stable population involving the consistent participation of Black and Caucasian Youth from early childhood through adulthood and middle age. It included over 16,000 participants. Berenson led the study until 2014 (and it has continued to the present day).

From 1985 to 1987, in connection with his leadership of the Bogalusa Heart Study, he served as director of the first National Research and Demonstration Center- Arteriosclerosis, as designated by the National Heart Lung and Blood Institute.

In 1986, Berenson was named Boyd Professor, the highest award for a faculty member at Louisiana State University. In 1987, he built upon the findings of the Bogalusa Heart Study to create "Health Ahead/Heart Smart," a health education program for children that addressed issues such as self-esteem, exercise, nutrition, violence, drugs, and sexually transmitted diseases.

In 1991, he joined the faculty at Tulane University, where his family funded a professorship to honor his research, transferring the National Institutes of Health grant funding the Bogalusa Heart Study to Tulane. In 2001, he was named Chair in Preventive Cardiology. In 2015, Berenson accepted an appointment as a research professor at LSU, which he held until his death in 2018. In 2002, he became a founding member of the International Child Cardiovascular Cohort Consortium.

He was the author of five medical books and over 1,000 research articles in peer-reviewed journals that spanned the fields of cardiology, pediatrics, biochemistry, epidemiology, and public health.

== Selected books ==
- Berenson, Gerald S. Cardiovascular Risk Factors in Children: The Early Natural History of Atherosclerosis and Essential Hypertension. New York: Oxford University Press, 1980.
- Berenson Gerald S., ed. Causation of Cardiovascular Risk Factors in Children: Perspectives on Cardiovascular Risk in Early Life. New York: Raven Press, 1986.
- Berenson, Gerald S., ed. Evolution of Cardio-Metabolic Risk from Birth to Middle Age. Dordrecht: Springer, 2011.

== Selected articles ==
- Berenson, Gerald S., Saul Roseman, and Albert Dorfman. "A Chromatographic Method for the Separation of Acid Mucopolysaccharides." Biochimica et Biophysica Acta 17 (1955): 75-80.
- Newman, Joyce K., Gerald S. Berenson, Martin B. Mathews, Eugene Goldwasser, and Albert Dorfman. "The Isolation of the Non-specific Hyaluronidase Inhibitor of Human Blood." The Journal of Biological Chemistry 217 (1955): 31-41.
- Berenson, G. S., B. Radhakrishnamurthy, A. F. Fishkin, H. Dessauer, and P. Arquembourg. "Individuality of Glycoproteins in Human Aorta." Journal of Atherosclerosis Research 6 no. 3 (1966): 214-223.
- Berenson, Gerald S., Bhandaru Radhakrishnamurthy, Edward R. Dalferes, Jr., and Sathanur R. Srinivasan. "Carbohydrate Macromolecules and Atherosclerosis." Human Pathology 2 no. 1 (1971): 57-79.
- Newman, William P. III, David S. Freedman, Antonie W. Voors, Paul D. Gard, Sathanur R. Srinivasan, James L. Cresanta, G. David Williamson, Larry S. Webber, and Gerald S. Berenson. "Relation of Serum Lipoprotein Levels and Systolic Blood Pressure to Early Atherosclerosis: The Bogalusa Heart Study." The New England Journal of Medicine 314 (January 16, 1986): 138-144.
- Berenson, Gerald S., and Arthur S. Pickoff. "Preventive Cardiology and Its Potential Influence on the Early Natural History of Adult Heart Diseases: The Bogalusa Heart Study and the Heart Smart Program." The American Journal of the Medical Sciences 310 Supplement 1 (1995): S133-S138.
- Berenson, Gerald S., Sathanur R. Srinivasan, Weihang Bao, William P. Newman III, Richard E. Tracy, and Wendy Wattigney. "Association between Multiple Cardiovascular Risk Factors and Atherosclerosis in Children and Young Adults." The New England Journal of Medicine 338 (June 4, 1998): 1650-1656.

== Awards and honors ==
Berenson received numerous awards in the field of cardiology, as well as other awards for his commitment to the health of children and adults. His research grants totaled over $55 million from the National Institutes of Health. He and his wife received the A.I. Botnick Torch of Liberty Award from the Anti-Defamation League of New Orleans. He was one of the earliest members of the American Society for Biochemistry and Molecular.

His awards and honors include:

- Member, Association of University Cardiologists, 1979
- Boyd Professorship at Louisiana State University, 1986
- Searle Distinguished Research Award, 1985
- Founders Medal of the Southern Society for Clinical Investigation, 1988
- Laureate of the American College of Physicians, 1994
- Fiftieth Anniversary Life Time Achievement Award, the 1945 School of Medicine Class of Tulane University, 1995
- Lewis C. Robbins Recognition Award, 1995
- Kids First Award, the New Orleans Council for Young Children, 1997
- Joseph Stokes III Award, the American Society of Preventive Cardiology, 1998
- Outstanding Alumnus Award of Tulane University, 1999
- Spirit of Charity Award, Medical Center of Louisiana Foundation, 1999
- Gerald S. Berenson Chair in Preventive Cardiology, Tulane University, 2001
- Tzedakah Award (along with Joan Berenson), Jewish Endowment Foundation of Louisiana, 2001
- Orleans Parish Medical Society Award for Public Service/Public Education, 2002
- Commitment and Services Award of the Gulf Regional Chapter of the American Society of Hypertension, 2004
- Meritorious Achievement Award, the American Heart Association, 2006
- Population Research Prize, the American Heart Association, 2006
- Honorary Alumnus of the LSU Alumni Association, 2007
- Jan J. Kellerman Memorial Award, the International Academy of Cardiology, 2007
- Distinguished Scientist Award, the American Heart Association, 2008
- Lifetime Achievement of the New Orleans Academy of Internal Medicine, 2008
- Cecil J. Picard Award of Excellence in Education to Prevent Childhood Obesity, the Louisiana Council on Obesity Prevention and Management, 2009
- Paavo Nurmi Foundation International Childhood Cardiovascular Cohort (13C) Consortium, 2013
- Distinguished Master Laureate, American Board of Cardiology, 2014
- A. I. Botnick Torch of Liberty Award (along with Joan Berenson), the Anti-Defamation League of New Orleans, 2014
- Physician Award for Community Service, Louisiana State Medical Society, 2016

== Personal life ==
Berenson married Joan Seidenbach Berenson (1951 – 2018) and they had four children: two daughters and two sons (Leslie Berenson, Ann Berenson Goldfarb, Robert Berenson, Laurie Berenson Maas). Berenson died in Houston, Texas on November 22, 2018, aged 96.
