= Moncef Lazaâr =

- Born: لمنصف الأزعر; 24 May 1942
- Died: 25 November 2018 (aged 76)
- Occupations: Actor; Screenwriter
- Notable work: Ghada

Moncef Lazaâr (24 May 1942 – 25 November 2018) was a Tunisian actor and screenwriter.

== Biography ==
Moncef Lazaâr was a prominent actor in theatrical compositions, but he is best known for his TV movies, most notable of which was when he played Mohamed Hadj Slimane in the TV series Ghada in 1994. He also portrayed Abdelkader Jerbi in the 1995 series El Hassad alongside actress Dalila Meftahi.

In 2005, he wrote the script for the movie Chara Al Hobb, which was directed by Hamadi Arafa.

== Filmography ==
Year	Title	Role	Notes
1993	Ommi Traki		
1994	Ghada	Ismail	TV mini-series
1995	El Hassad		TV series
2005	Chara Al Honb		TV series

== Theatre ==
- Almalayika
- Allayl Ah Ya Layl
- Baba We Ando Bouh
