= Hatem Ben Rabah =

Tunisian actor

- Born: 11 December 1970
- Died: 18 November 2018 (aged 47)
- Other names: Hatem Berrabah, Hatem Berrabeh
- Occupation: Actor
- Years active: 1994–
- Notable work: La Danse du vent A Summer in La Goulette; The Silences of the Palace; El Kottab Al Bab

Hatem Ben Rabah, Hatem Berrabeh, or Hatem Berrabeh was a Tunisian actor.

== Biography ==
Ben Rabah played starring roles in TV shows El Kottab Al Bab and Liyam Kif Errih under the direction of Slaheddine Essid.

He also had roles in the movies La Danse du Vent, A Summer in Goulette, and The Silences of the Palace.

== Filmography ==
=== Movies ===
- 1994: The Silences of the Palace by Moufida Tlatli: Salim
- 1996: A Summer in La Goulette by Férid Boughedir: Salvatore
- 2004: The Dance of the Wind by Taïeb Louhichi
- 2018: Similar by Habib Mestiri

=== Series ===
- 1990: Hokm Al-Ayam (Rule of days) by Abdelkader Jerbi, Fraj Slama and Slaheddine Chelbi: Lotfi
- 1992: Liyam Kif Errih (Days like wind) by Slaheddine Essid: Houcine
- 1993–1994: Ordinary heroes: skewer seller
- 1997: El Khottab Al Bab (Grooms on the door) (season 2) by Slaheddine Essid: Elyes
- 2000: Ya Zahratan Fi Khayeli (What a Flower in my Imagination) by Abdelkader Jerbi and Mostapha Odweni: Jalel
- 2010: Min Ayam Maliha (For the Memory of Maliha) by Abdelkader Jerbi and Abdelkader Bel Haj Nasser
