= Raymond Arritt =

American agronomist (1957–2018)

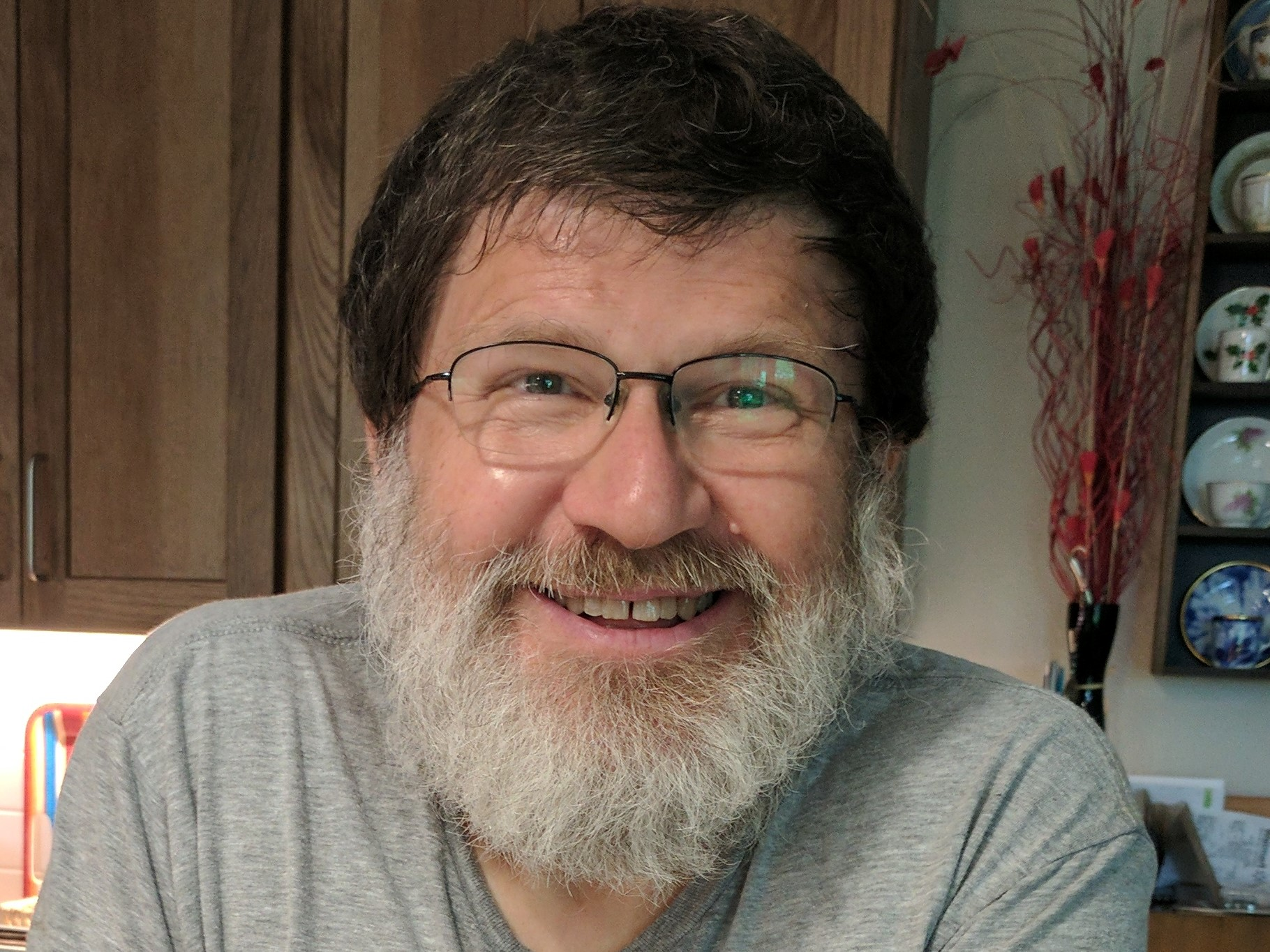
- Born: Raymond Ward Arritt; September 19, 1957; Covington, Virginia, US
- Died: November 14, 2018 (aged 61); Des Moines, Iowa, US
- Education: University of Virginia (BA, MS); Colorado State University (PhD)
- Scientific career
- Fields: Agronomy; Meteorology
- Institutions: Iowa State University
- Thesis: Numerical Studies of Thermally and Mechanically Forced Circulations Over Complex Terrain (1985)
- Doctoral advisor: Roger A. Pielke

Raymond Ward Arritt (September 19, 1957 – November 14, 2018) was an American agronomist whose research focused on agricultural meteorology. He taught at Iowa State University from 1993 until his death in 2018. At Iowa State, he was responsible for operating the meteorological data repository Iowa Environmental Mesonet. He was one of three Iowa State faculty who contributed to the fourth (AR4) Intergovernmental Panel on Climate Change (IPCC) assessment report, which led to the IPCC sharing the 2007 Nobel Peace Prize with Al Gore.

== Early life and education ==
Arritt was born on September 19, 1957, in Covington, Virginia, to Muriel Louise Smith and Raymond Ward Arritt Sr. He grew up in the Virginia cities of Lynchburg and Richmond. He attended the University of Virginia, at which he earned his B.A. in economics and environmental science in 1979 and his M.S. in environmental science in 1982. In 1985, he received his Ph.D. from Colorado State University, under the supervision of Roger A. Pielke Sr. He then worked as a research associate at the Cooperative Institute for Research in the Atmosphere at Colorado State for three years.

== Academic career ==
Arritt took his first academic position at the University of Kansas in 1988. He was an assistant professor in the Department of Physics and Astronomy there until 1993, when he joined the faculty of Iowa State as an associate professor. He became a full professor at Iowa State in 2000. He was a member of the American Geophysical Union, the American Meteorological Society, and the American Society of Agronomy.

He was also a contributing author of the third (TAR) and fourth (AR4) Intergovernmental Panel on Climate Change (IPCC) assessment reports. According to the Principles Governing IPCC Work, the function of contributing authors is to "prepare technical information in the form of text, graphs or data for assimilation by the Lead Authors into the draft section." They are part of the author team that bears a collectively "required to critically assess information they would like to include from any source" and this applies both to IPCC Reports and to "papers undergoing the publication process in peer-reviewed journals." Along with Bill Gutowski and Gene Takle, Arritt was one of three Iowa State faculty who contributed to AR4, which led to the IPCC sharing the 2007 Nobel Peace Prize with Al Gore. After the winners of this prize were announced, Arritt told the Des Moines Register, "It's kind of neat: I have, like, .002 percent of a Nobel prize now – shared with about 2,000 other people". The IPCC has noted that the Nobel Prize was awarded to the organization itself rather than to any individual associated with it or its reports.

== Research ==
At Iowa State, Arritt's research focused on aspects of the climate of the United States, such as increases in heavy rainfall and decreases in wind speeds.

== Personal life ==
Arritt met Teresita Navarrete while in the final year of his undergraduate program at the University of Virginia in 1979. They married on March 29, 1980. He died on November 14, 2018, at Mercy Medical Center in Des Moines, Iowa, after experiencing a stroke.
