= Gianfranco Rastrelli =

Italian politician and trade unionist

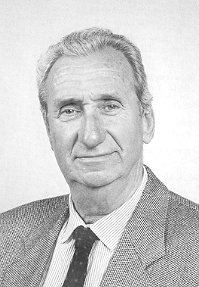
Photo of Gianfranco Rastrelli

Gianfranco Rastrelli (28 February 1932 – 21 November 2018) was an Italian politician and trade unionist.

He held high ranking posts in the Italian General Confederation of Labour and was active in other unions prior to his election to the Chamber of Deputies in 1994 as a representative of the Democrats of the Left from Tuscany.
