= Andrew Varley =

American politician (1934–2018)

Speaker of the Iowa House of Representatives
- In office 1973–1975

Member of the Iowa House of Representatives
- In office January 9, 1967 to January 7, 1979

Personal details
- Born: December 2, 1934 Stuart, Iowa, U.S.
- Died: November 19, 2018 (aged 83) Stuart, Iowa, U.S.
- Party: Republican
- Education: Iowa State University
- Occupation: farmer

Andrew Preston Varley (December 2, 1934 – November 19, 2018) was an American politician in the state of Iowa.

Varley was born in Stuart, Iowa. He attended Iowa State University and North Carolina State University and was a farmer. He served in the Iowa House of Representatives from 1967 to 1979 as a Republican. He served as Speaker of the Iowa House of Representatives from 1973 to 1975.

He died on November 19, 2018, in Stuart, Iowa at age 83.
