= Wayne Stayskal =

American political cartoonist

Wayne Stayskal (December 11, 1931 – November 20, 2018) was an American political cartoonist for the Tampa Tribune and previously for the Chicago Tribune.

== Early life and education ==
Born in Oak Park, Illinois, Stayskal was a 1950 graduate of Chicago's Steinmetz High School. He served in the U.S. Air Force, spending a period of time stationed in Paris, France. He married the love of his life, Helen, on September 21, 1951.

== Professional career ==
With nudging from his wife Helen, Stayskal enrolled in the Chicago Academy of Fine Arts while continuing to drive a taxi; he graduated in 1956.

After his mentor, Vaughn Shoemaker, retired, Stayskal became the chief cartoonist for the Chicago's American. The American was later renamed Chicago Today and converted to a tabloid in 1969, and some of Stayskal's work appeared in the Chicago Tribune in 1973 after Chicago Today discontinued its weekend editions.

Stayskal left the Chicago Tribune in 1984 to become the editorial cartoonist for the Tampa Tribune, where he worked until retiring in 2004. His cartoons continued to be syndicated worldwide until he fully retired in 2010.

"People really felt that cartoon; but it's funny, I don't want to draw that way," Stayskal told the Chicago Tribune in 1974.

Stayskal also coauthored several books with his good friend Cal Thomas, a newspaper columnist, including the 1985 book Liberals for Lunch. Thomas honored Stayskal by saying, "I think he has been one of the greatest cartoonist/commentators of our time, especially on matters touching on faith and culture."

After he retired from the Tampa Tribune in 2004, Stayskal and his wife moved back to the Chicago area, settling first in St. Charles and then in a retirement community in Carol Stream. He continued to draw syndicated cartoons until he retired completely in 2010.

== Death ==
Stayskal died in Carol Stream, Illinois on November 20, 2018 from complications due to Alzheimer's disease.
