= Arnie Stocks =

Canadian football player (1927–2018)

Profile
- Position: Halfback

Personal information
- Born: June 5, 1927; Toronto, Ontario, Canada
- Died: November 10, 2018 (aged 91)
- Listed height: 6 ft 3 in (1.91 m)
- Listed weight: 100 lb (45 kg)

Career history
- 1949–1950: Toronto Argonauts
- 1951: Calgary Stampeders

Awards and highlights
- Grey Cup champion (1950)

Arnold Hugh Stocks (June 5, 1927 – November 10, 2018) was a Canadian professional football player who played for the Toronto Argonauts and Calgary Stampeders. He won the Grey Cup with the Argonauts in 1950. He died in November 2018 at the age of 91.
