= Sam Foose =

American automotive customizer and fabricator

- Born: March 23, 1934; Southern California
- Died: November 28, 2018 (aged 84)
- Known for: Hot Rodding, Car Customizing
- Spouse: Terry Foose
- Children: 3 Daughters, Chip Foose

Sam Foose (1934 – November 28, 2018) was an American automotive customizer and fabricator known for his custom metalwork as well as his paint jobs on car customizations in the 1970s and 1980s.

== Early life ==
Born in Southern California in 1934, Sam Foose was 14-year-old when his family moved from Santa Barbara, California to Arizona. Sam chose to remain in Santa Barbara, live on his own, and support himself. Foose learned basic metalworking and mechanical skills from his junior high school shop class and he picked up what additional skills he could on his own. With these skills he would turn wrenches, weld, paint, or do metal working to make ends meet. Later, Foose would develop his skills in pencil drawing, design work, and air brushing. While in high school, Foose built his first hot rod, a 1942 Ford coupe. In 1955, that car garnered awards at the Los Angeles Autorama car show.

Foose was a US Army Korean War veteran. Although his time in the Army took him away from customizing cars, Sam put his mechanical abilities to use. In addition to his primary military responsibilities, Foose set up an informal repair shop and fixed broken-down jeeps and other US Army vehicles during the war.

== Career ==
Following his return from the Korean War, Foose joined the AMT model company which sold 1:25 scale model cars. There, along with Gene Winfeld, he built full-sized custom car replicas of the AMT models to promote the scale model car kits. Following his work with AMT, Foose took a job with the organization called Minicars, building safety car prototypes. Minicars was part of a government-funded program which worked on innovations and improvement in air bags, crumple zones, and pedestrian impact standards.

=== Project Designs ===
While being employed elsewhere, Foose customized cars on his own time. In 1970, he founded Project Designs, a custom car shop located in Santa Barbara, California. From his shop, and in some cases in collaboration with other car builders, Foose created a number of hot rods and car customizations. Some of his builds include: "The Foose Ford", Pantera Custom Roadster, Goodguys '32 Ford Tudor, and Alien '40.

==== "The Foose Ford" ====
One of Foose's hot rod builds was a stretched and smoothed 1949 Ford coupe. The build was originally conceived by Hot Wheels designer Harry Bentley Bradley, who published his designs in a 1983 edition of Street Rodder magazine. In 1996, Don Lowe began a build based upon Bradley's designs, but Lowe eventually sold the project to Jack Barnard. Barnard contracted with Foose to complete the customized "shoebox" Ford, which came to be known as "The Foose Ford".

==== 1972 De Tomaso Pantera Custom Roadster ====
An unconventional Foose hot rod project was a custom roadster modeled after the Alfa Romeo Carabo coupe. The Carabo was a wedge-shaped concept car that was exhibited at the 1968 Paris Motor Show. Fabricating a large portion of the car, Foose transformed a crash-damaged 1972 De Tomaso Pantera into a roadster-version of the Carabo.

==== Goodguys '32 Ford Tudor ====
In the early 1980s, Goodguys Rod & Custom Association founder Gary Meadors contracted Foose to remake his 1932 Ford Tudor sedan. Sam reworked the Tudor into the smoothie-style fender-less hot rod. Sam's son Chip Foose, designed the color scheme and graphics for the car. A cartoon version of Gary's Tudor has been functioning as the logo for the Goodguys association since 1987.

==== Alien '40 ====
Foose collaborated with his son Chip Foose to create a customized 1940 Ford Sedan Delivery knows as Alien '40. Chip created the design concept. Sam reworked the original sheet metal on the car and fabricated hand-built custom body pieces for the "100% all-steel" car.

== Family ==
Sam Foose and his wife, Terry, had four children: three daughters and a son. Their son, Chip Foose, would follow in his father's footsteps and become a renowned car customizer in his own right. In his later years Sam would remark, "I used to be Sam Foose, now I am Chip's dad."

== Death and legacy ==
On November 28, 2018, at the age of 83, Foose died of complications from cancer. Sam and Terry's daughter Amy died in 1985 at the age of 16, from complications from Hutchinson-Gilford progeria syndrome.

In January 2020, the Grand National Roadster Show began recognizing excellence in design and custom bodywork with its annual Sam Foose Memorial Design Award.
