= Robert C. Atchley =

American sociologist and gerontologist (1939–2018)

Robert C. Atchley (1939 – 13 November 2018) was an American gerontologist and sociologist.

Atchley graduated from Miami University in 1961, and taught at his alma mater from 1966 (named Distinguished Professor in 1986) to 1998, when he joined the Naropa University faculty. He retired in 2004. Atchley led the American Society on Aging from 1988 to 1990 as president, and founded the journal Contemporary Gerontology.
