= Mimoun El Oujdi =

Moroccan raï singer

Mimoun El Oujdi ميمون الوجدي
- Born: Mimoun Bakouch ميمون بكوش; 4 February 1953; Oujda, Morocco
- Died: 3 November 2018 (aged 65); Casablanca, Morocco
- Occupation: Raï singer

Mimoun El Oujdi (Arabic: ميمون الوجدي) was a Moroccan singer of the Raï genre of music. Like other Maghrebi raï singers, he is habitually given the title "Cheb" (الشاب), meaning "young", and is usually known as Cheb Mimoun El Oujdi (الشاب ميمون الوجدي). He was born Mimoun Bakoush (ميمون بكوش) in Oujda in 1953, fifteen kilometres from the Algerian border. Mimoun El Oujdi released 18 albums between 1982 and 2012, including Barmān (1985), Alamāne (1995) and Soulouh (2008). He died in November 2018.

== Releases ==
Album releases by Mimoun El Oujdi include the following, with year, approximate transliteration and original title:

- 2010: Raqat al-basma (رقة البسمة)
- 2008: Soulouh (سولوه)
- 2004: Ghorba bla wniss (غربة بلا ونيس)
- 2000: Marjāna (مرجانة)
- 1997: Tnahad qalbi ki tfakart (تنهد قلبي كي تفكرت)
- 1996: Aadite ezinne (عاديت الزين)
- 1995: Alamāne (ألمان)
- 1992: Az-zin wma darte fia (الزين وما درت فيا)
- 1990: Alkay fat-talafun (الكي فالتيليفون)
- 1988: Salwa al-maktāb (سالوا المكتاب)
- 1987: Ana bagheit habibi (أنا بغيت حبيبي)
- 1986: Ya moul taksi (يا مول الطاكسي)
- 1985: Barmān (بارمان)
- 1984: Ash-shidda ma tdoum (الشدة ما تدوم)
- 1984: Ana ma nawlish (أنا ما نوليش)
- 1984: Raha djaia mehnati (راها جاية محنتي)
- 1982: En-nar kedāt (النار كدات)
