= Armando Rueda =

Mexican weightlifter (1929–2018)

Personal information
- Born: 19 February 1929; Torreón, Mexico
- Died: 27 November 2018 (aged 89)

Sport
- Sport: Weightlifting

Armando Rueda (19 February 1929 – 27 November 2018) was a Mexican weightlifter. He competed at the 1948 Summer Olympics and the 1952 Summer Olympics.
