= Lee Weiss =

American painter (1928–2018)

- Born: Elyse Marion Crouse; May 22, 1928; Inglewood, California
- Died: November 26, 2018 (aged 90); Madison, Wisconsin
- Other name: Elyse Weiss
- Education: California College of the Arts

Lee Weiss (May 22, 1928 – November 26, 2018) was an American painter based in Wisconsin, mainly known for her watercolors.

== Early life and education ==
Lee Weiss was born Elyse Marion Crouse on May 22, 1928, in Inglewood, Los Angeles County, California. She grew up in nearby Santa Ana, California.

She attended California College of Arts and Crafts for a year, studied under Nels Eric Oback, and was critiqued by Alexander Nepote. However, for the most part, Weiss was a self taught artist.

== Work ==
To achieve the specific textural qualities that she felt watercolor lacked, Weiss invented a watercolor technique in which she painted both sides of the paper, turning the paper back and forth while the paint was still wet. That way, the paint from one side transfers to the table and then to the other side of the paper, along with some of the table's texture. This process is continued until an adequate surface has been built up to suggest a subject and composition. In general, she worked away from the subject matter, in the studio without sketches or slides, allowing the process of painting to guide the portrayal. She also worked in a more traditional manner, forgoing the surface treatment of the paper, and starting directly with a brush and subject.

She painted her impressions of a space shuttle launch in 1984, under the auspices of the NASA art program.

== Awards and fellowships ==
Weiss won watercolor awards including the Medal of Honor for Watercolor at the Knickerbocker Artists and the Emily Lowe Memorial Award.

In 2011 she was awarded a Wisconsin Visual Art Lifetime Achievement Award and her art was featured in a show alongside that of painter and printmaker JoAnna Poehlmann.

== Selected exhibitions ==
Lee Weiss has had solo exhibitions in California, Iowa, Michigan, Minnesota, and Wisconsin, including a 1962 solo museum show at the California Palace of the Legion of Honor. She has been included in international group exhibitions in Japan and France.

Her work was on display in the White House, in 1969 and 1972, when her paintings were selected for this honor by the Smithsonian Institution.

== Collections ==
Lee Weiss has work in over sixty museum and corporate collections, including: the Smithsonian American Art Museum, Racine Art Museum, Milwaukee Art Museum.

== Publications ==
- Watercolors II, The Seventies. American Printing & Publishing Inc. 1981.
- Lee Weiss, 25 years in Wisconsin : a survey of paintings from 1962 to 1987. Racine Art Association, Charles A. Wustum Museum of Fine Arts. 1987.
- Watercolors III. Winchell Art Publications. 1990.

== Death ==
On November 26, 2018, Lee Weiss died peacefully at home with her family by her side.
