= Herbert Woodson =

American engineer (1925–2018)

Herbert Horace Woodson (April 25, 1925 – November 30, 2018) was an American engineer, who was the Ernest H. Cockrell Centennial Chair Emeritus and Dean Emeritus at Cockrell School of Engineering, University of Texas at Austin. He was a Life Fellow of the Institute of Electrical and Electronics Engineers and a member of the National Academy of Engineering.
