= Yu-chien Kuan =

German university teacher and writer

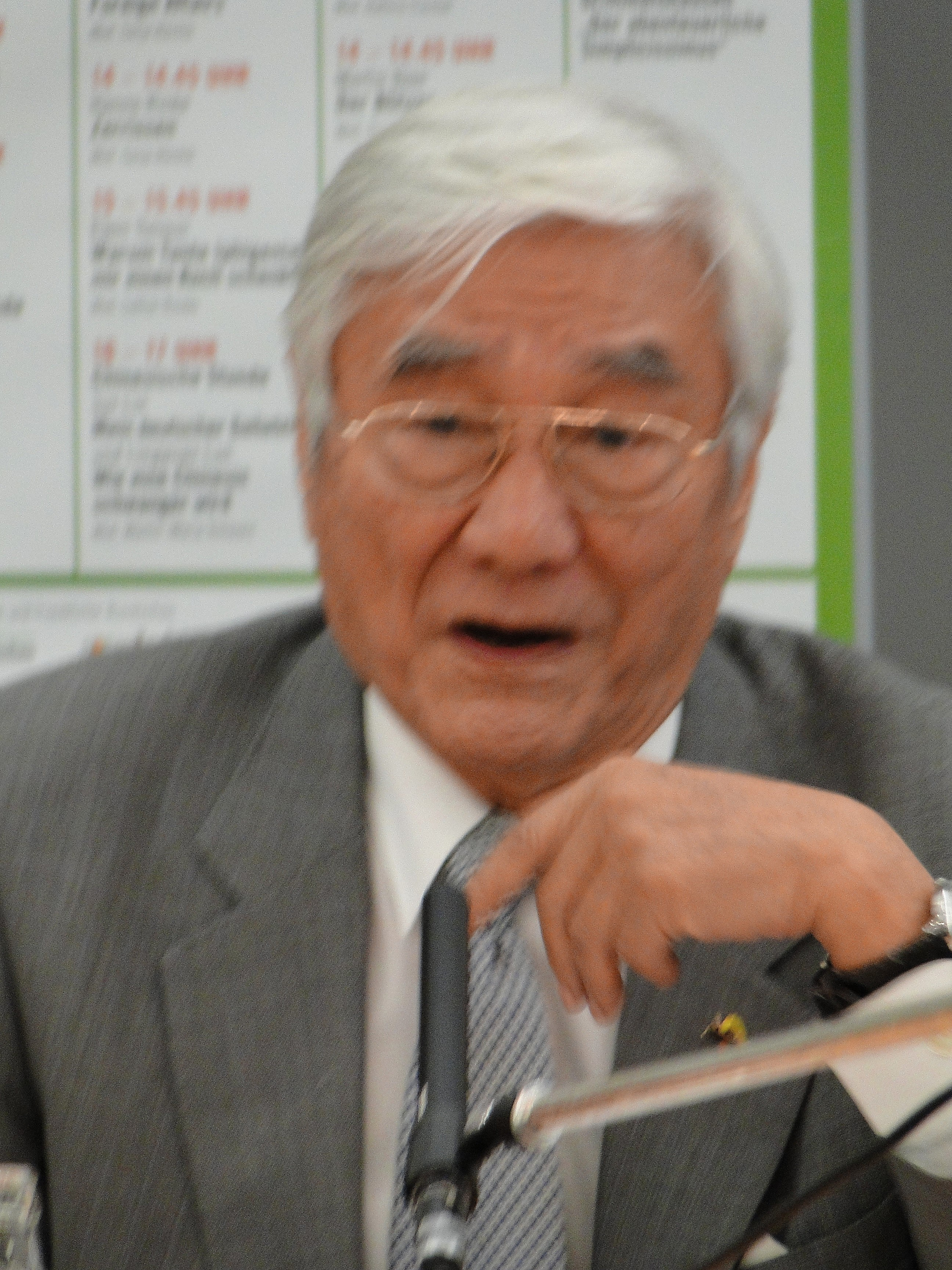
- Kuan in 2009
- Born: Guan Yuqian; 18 February 1931; Guangzhou, Guangdong, China
- Died: 22 November 2018 (aged 87); Berlin, Germany
- Education: Beijing Foreign Studies University, University of Hamburg
- Occupations: Sinologist, writer and translator
- Spouse(s): Meizhen (divorced); Petra Häring-Kuan
- Parent(s): Guan Yiwen; Yan Zhongyun
- Writing career
- Language: Chinese, German, English
- Period: 1970s–2018
- Subject: China

Chinese name
- Traditional Chinese: 關愚謙
- Simplified Chinese: 关愚谦
Transcriptions
Standard Mandarin
- Hanyu Pinyin: Guān Yúqiān
- Wade–Giles: Kuan Yü-ch'ien

Yu-chien Kuan or Guan Yuqian (Chinese: 关愚谦; 18 February 1931 – 22 November 2018) was a Chinese-born German sinologist, writer and translator. The son of a high-ranking Chinese Communist Party official, he was denounced as a "rightist" and persecuted during the Anti-Rightist Campaign and the Cultural Revolution. This drove him to escape from China using a Japanese passport stolen from his workplace. He landed in Egypt and spent a year and half in prison for illegal entry, before being admitted to West Germany in 1969 as a political refugee.

In Germany, he earned a Ph.D. from the University of Hamburg, became a sinology professor at the university and served as an advisor to politicians including Chancellor Helmut Schmidt. He published 26 books, including ten co-authored with his wife, Petra Häring-Kuan. He also collaborated with Wolfgang Kubin to translate the works of Lu Xun into German.

== Early life ==
Kuan was born on 18 February 1931, in Guangzhou (Canton), Guangdong, Republic of China. His father, Guan Xibin (关锡斌), who later changed his name to Guan Yiwen (管易文), studied in France and graduated from Yale University in the United States. His mother, Yan Zhongyun (言忠芸), was a devout Christian. He was the youngest of three children, with a sister and a brother.

Soon after Kuan's birth, his mother brought the children to live in Beiping (now Beijing). When the Second Sino-Japanese War broke out in 1937, the family fled Beiping and became refugees, eventually settling in the Shanghai French Concession. Kuan grew up in Shanghai with his mother, while his father joined the Chinese Communist Party (CCP) and fought in the Second Sino-Japanese War. Kuan studied at St. Francis Xavier's College, a Catholic school. After the end of World War II, he ran errands for American soldiers stationed in Shanghai and perfected the English he learned at school through his interactions with them.

== People's Republic of China ==
When the Communists won the Civil War and established the People's Republic of China in 1949, Kuan's father was appointed to a high position in the East China Military Region and served as an interpreter for Marshal Chen Yi, who became Mayor of Shanghai. Kuan also learned for the first time that his older sister had been an underground CCP member.

In 1949, Kuan enrolled at the Beijing Foreign Language School (now Beijing Foreign Studies University), majoring in Russian, which was in high demand because of Communist China's close relations with the Soviet Union. After graduating in 1953, he worked as an interpreter for Soviet technical specialists in China.

Kuan's westernized education and outlook were often at odds with the new communist ethos of China. While the revolutionaries took pride in wearing plain clothes or even rags, he preferred to be well dressed and was criticized as a bourgeois. In the fleeting liberal milieu of the Hundred Flowers Campaign in 1956, a politically naive Kuan wrote big-character posters criticizing the CCP, which became evidence against him in the subsequent Anti-Rightist Campaign, during which he was denounced as a "rightist" in 1958.

After his denunciation, Kuan was banished to Qinghai province on the Tibetan Plateau. Initially working as a photojournalist in the provincial capital Xining, in 1959 he was sent to Riyueshan People's Commune to perform hard labour. He nearly starved to death during the Great Famine, before his father, by then a high-ranking official in the State Council, arranged to transfer him back to Beijing in 1962. He then worked at the Chinese People's World Peace Committee, an official organ in charge of managing foreign visitors.

== Escape from China ==
When the Cultural Revolution began in 1966, Kuan, like many other "rightists", was again targeted for persecution. With his marriage already strained for personal reasons, his wife Meizhen (美珍), with whom he had a son, publicly denounced him. In February 1968, he was told to attend an upcoming struggle session against him. Convinced that he was to be tortured, he considered committing suicide before deciding to make a daring escape from China. As his work involved registering foreign visitors, Kuan had access to foreign passports. One of them belonged to the Japanese national Saionji Kazuteru (西園寺 一晃), who somewhat resembled Kuan. He took the passport, which contained an Egyptian visa, purchased a plane ticket to Cairo via Karachi, Pakistan, and fled China using Saionji's identity.

Soon after he landed in Cairo, Kuan was arrested by the Egyptian police for illegally entering the country. The Chinese government denounced him as a "traitor" and demanded his repatriation, while the world's intelligence agencies fought over the prominent prisoner. In 1969, China dropped its repatriation request for reasons he never found out, while the United States, which had just accepted the famous Chinese defector Ma Sicong, offered him asylum. However, Kuan refused to go to the US because it had been at war with China in Korea and Vietnam, and he did not want to defect to an enemy country.

== Life and career in Germany ==
After he was imprisoned in Egypt for a year and a half, the International Red Cross arranged to have Kuan accepted as a political refugee in West Germany, and he landed in Münster in 1969. He enrolled in the University of Hamburg and received his Ph.D. in Sinology in 1974. At the university he met his future wife Petra Häring. He was hired as a lecturer at Hamburg, and later became a professor. He trained several generations of German sinologists, and served as an advisor to German politicians, including Chancellor Helmut Schmidt, on Chinese affairs.

After the death of Mao Zedong and the end of the Cultural Revolution in 1976, China entered the reform and opening period under Deng Xiaoping. Kuan, the former "traitor", was allowed to visit China in 1981, and learned that his brother and ex-wife had both been imprisoned for six years because of his defection. His mother had already died two years before, but his father, and his son, who was by then an adult, were alive and well. In 2001, he published his autobiography Lang (浪, "Vagabond"), for which Wang Meng, China's former Minister of Culture, wrote the preface.

Kuan wrote 26 books in Chinese, German, English, and Italian, ten of which were co-authored with his second wife Petra Häring-Kuan, also known by her Chinese name Hai Peichun (海佩春). Among them is the 2001 book Pulverfass China ("Powder Keg China"), for which the couple interviewed 200 people. He also worked with Wolfgang Kubin to translate the works of Lu Xun into German.

== Cancer and death ==
Kuan was diagnosed with cancer in 2016. He decided to spend the remainder of his life seeing the world with his wife. The couple travelled around Europe, Asia, and North and South America, for almost two years. They only stopped when he felt too weak to continue. A few weeks later, he died in Berlin on 22 November 2018, at the age of 87.
