= Anne Pomeroy Autor =

Canadian scientist

- Born: January 26, 1935; Prince George, British Columbia
- Died: November 13, 2018 (aged 83)
- Education: Duke University; University of British Columbia; Victoria High School
- Scientific career
- Workplaces: University of British Columbia; University of Iowa; Al Ain University; Aga Khan University Hospital, Karachi
- Thesis: Studies in the mechanism of action of streptomycin (1957)

Anne Pomeroy Autor (January 26, 1935 – November 13, 2018) was a Canadian scientist who was a professor of biochemistry at the University of British Columbia. She worked closely with policy makers to inform public health campaigns and was committed to improving access to medical education.

== Early life and education ==
Autor was born in Prince George, British Columbia. Her father was with the Royal Canadian Mounted Police. Her mother was a school teacher and her family were pioneers in Vancouver. Autor attended Victoria High School. At the age of thirteen, she decided to become a scientist, later studying science at the University of Victoria. She moved to the University of British Columbia for undergraduate studies, where she majored in biochemistry. She eventually moved to Duke University for her doctorate in biochemistry, where she studied the molecular mechanisms that underpin the actions of streptomycin. Autor was a postdoctoral student at the University of Michigan. Her early research considered how oxygen can damage the lungs of premature babies. Autor was the only woman in her undergraduate, postgraduate and postdoctoral courses.

== Research and career ==
Autor started her academic career at the University of Iowa in 1972. She was the first woman lecturer in the Department of Pharmacology, and developed a faculty network to support women academics. In 1983, she left Iowa and returned to the University of British Columbia, where she worked alongside the hospital research groups and established a forensic pathology laboratory, and developed investigations into infant mortality.

Autor's research considered biochemistry and toxicology. She studied heavy metal toxicity in the environment, and developed an accredited programme on toxicology in the University of British Columbia. She acted as an advisor for the United States Environmental Protection Agency, where she aided the government on the management of toxic substances.

In 2000, Autor retired from the University of British Columbia. She served as an adjunct professor in the Al Ain University, and eventually made Professor and Vice Chair in Biomedical Sciences at the Aga Khan University Hospital, Karachi where she developed a medical education programme that included the humanities alongside technical scientific content.

== Personal life ==
Autor had two sons, both of whom became attorneys. In 1998, Autor and Beverley McLachlin were the first women to serve on the Vancouver Round Table.

Autor died on November 13, 2018, from complications caused by Alzheimer's disease.

== Selected publications ==
- G L Baker; R J Corry; Autor, Anne (1985). "Oxygen free radical induced damage in kidneys subjected to warm ischemia and reperfusion. Protective effect of superoxide dismutase". Annals of Surgery. 202 (5): 628–641. doi:10.1097/00000658-198511000-00016. PMC 1250979. PMID 3840348. Wikidata Q69804909.
- C M Doerschuk; M F Allard; B A Martin; A MacKenzie; Autor, Anne; J C Hogg (1987). "Marginated pool of neutrophils in rabbit lungs". Journal of Applied Physiology. 63 (5): 1806–1815. doi:10.1152/jappl.1987.63.5.1806. PMID 3693216. Wikidata Q69472752.
- Dryer SE; Dryer RL; Autor, Anne (1980). "Enhancement of mitochondrial, cyanide-resistant superoxide dismutase in the livers of rats treated with 2,4-dinitrophenol". Journal of Biological Chemistry. 255 (3): 1054–1057. PMID 7356650. Wikidata Q54557561.
- Autor, Anne Pomeroy (1982). Pathology of oxygen. New York: Academic Press. ISBN 0-12-068620-1. OCLC 8865397.
