= Roy T. Haverkamp =

American diplomat

Roy Theodore Haverkamp (December 10, 1924 – November 12, 2018) was an official in the United States Department of State. Haverkamp was the United States chargé d'affaires ad interim to Grenada from 1984 to 1986.

== Biography ==
Haverkamp was born in St. Louis, Missouri in 1924. Once he graduated high school in 1943 he enlisted in the United States Army Air Forces and served as a bomber pilot in the European theater of operation with the 597th Bombardment Squadron. He graduated from Yale University in 1949, he then studied law at the University of Cambridge. Haverkamp joined the United States Foreign Service in 1952 and was sent to South Korea to be a political officer. From 1955 to 1957 he was in Stockholm. From 1957 to 1960 he worked at the embassy in Japan. In 1984 he was nominated by Ronald Reagan to be the United States Ambassador to Grenada. He died in Kensington, Maryland on November 12, 2018.
