= Wycliffe D. Toole Jr. =

Wycliffe David Toole Jr.
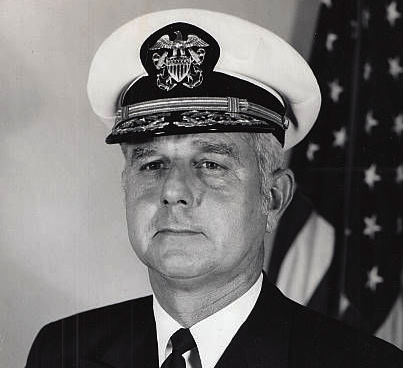
- Born: March 14, 1927; Augusta, Georgia, United States
- Died: November 4, 2018 (aged 91)
- Military career
- Allegiance: United States
- Branch: United States Navy
- Rank: Rear admiral

Wycliffe David Toole Jr. (March 14, 1927 - November 24, 2018) was a rear admiral in the United States Navy. He was a former commandant of the Fourth Naval District (1975–1978), First Naval District and Taiwan Patrol Force (1973–1975).
