= Zdzisław Sosnowski =

Polish footballer

Personal information
- Date of birth: 23 February 1924
- Place of birth: Warsaw, Russian Empire
- Date of death: 9 November 2018 (aged 94)
- Place of death: Warsaw, Poland
- Height: 1.83 m (6 ft 0 in)
- Position: Goalkeeper

Youth career
- Fort Bema Warsaw

Senior career*
Years	Team	Apps	(Gls)
- Pawianka Warsaw
- Korona Warsaw
1945	Warszawianka		
1945–1949	Polonia Warsaw		
1949–1951	Legia Warsaw		
1951–1955	Polonia Warsaw		
- * Club domestic league appearances and goals

Zdzisław Sosnowski (23 February 1924 – 9 November 2018) was a Polish footballer who played as a goalkeeper. He spent his entire playing career at Warsaw-based clubs, such as Fort Bema, Pawianka, Korona, Warszawianka, Polonia and Legia.

== Honours ==
Polonia Warsaw

- Ekstraklasa: 1946
- Polish Cup: 1952
