= John MacBrien =

Canadian sailor (1925–2018)

Joseph J. "Joe" MacBrien (20 February 1925 – 18 November 2018) was a Canadian sailor who competed in the 1964 Summer Olympics. He was born in Toronto.
