= William R. Maloney =

United States Marine Corps general

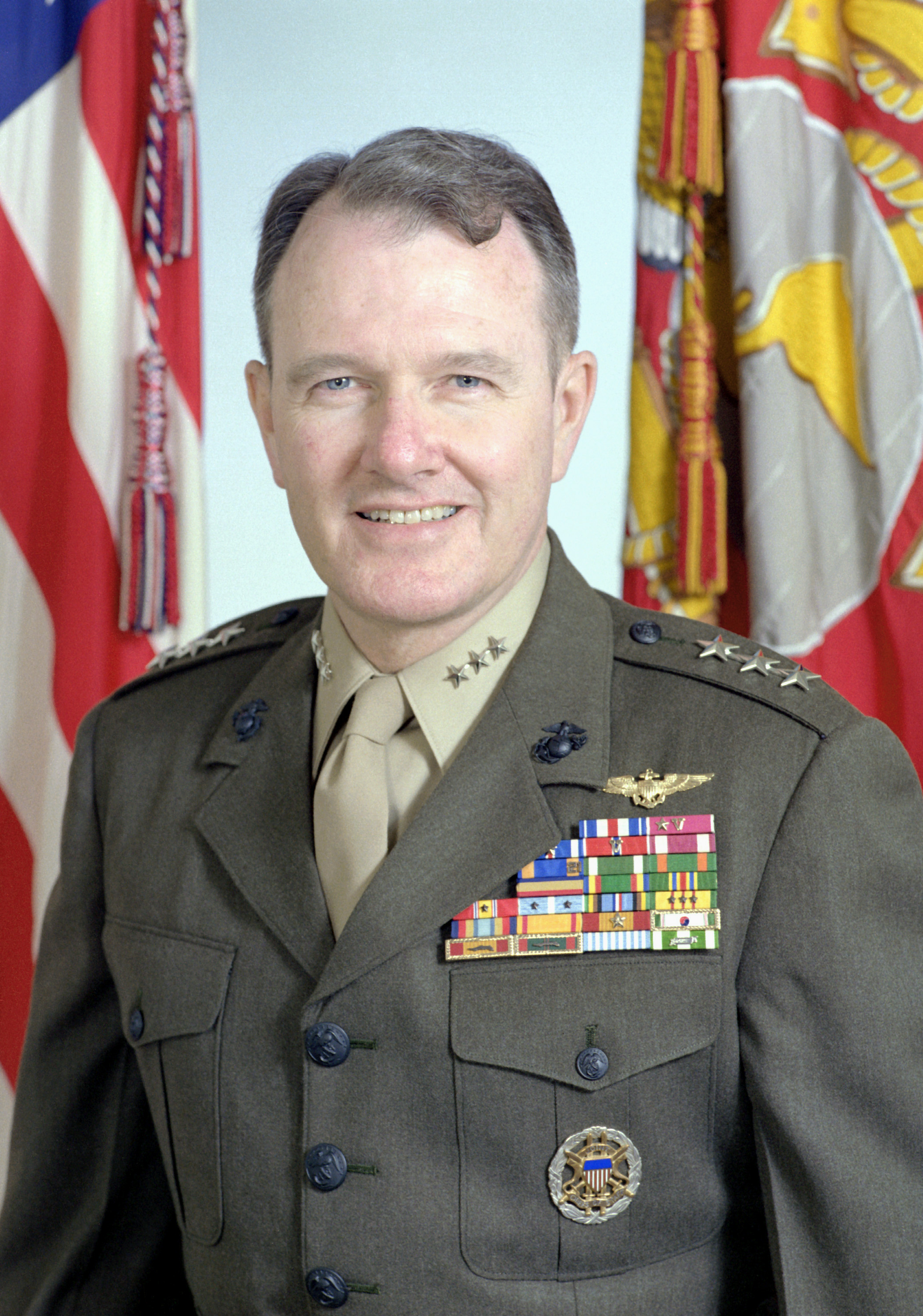
- Born: October 13, 1929; Pittsburgh, Pennsylvania, U.S.
- Died: November 13, 2018 (aged 89); Charlotte, North Carolina, U.S.
- Military career
- Allegiance: United States
- Branch: United States Marine Corps
- Service years: 1951–1985
- Rank: Lieutenant General
- Nickname: Bill
- Commands: Deputy Chief of Staff for Plans, Policies and Operations; Deputy Chief of Staff for Manpower; 1st Marine Aircraft Wing, 2nd Marine Aircraft Wing, 3rd Marine Aircraft Wing; 5th Marine Amphibious Brigade; Marine Aircraft Group 36; Marine Observation Squadron 6
- Conflicts: Korean War; Vietnam War
- Awards: Distinguished Service Medal; Silver Star Medal; Legion of Merit (2); Distinguished Flying Cross (2); Bronze Star Medal; Meritorious Service Medal; Air Medal (21)

William Russell Maloney (October 13, 1929 – November 13, 2018) was a lieutenant general in the United States Marine Corps who served as Deputy Chief of Staff for Manpower for the Marine Corps. He was commissioned in 1951 and retired in 1985.

Born in Pittsburgh, Maloney graduated from Brown University in 1951. He later earned an M.A. degree from Stanford University in 1963 and an M.S. degree from George Washington University in 1970. Maloney also graduated from the National War College in 1970.

Maloney served as an infantry officer during the Korean War, earning a Bronze Star Medal. Designated a naval aviator in 1955, he commanded Marine Observation Squadron 6 during the Vietnam War, earning a Silver Star Medal, two Distinguished Flying Crosses and twenty-one Air Medals.

After his death, Maloney and his wife Virginia "Jinny" (Fellows) Maloney (January 1, 1933 – May 19, 2018) were interred at Arlington National Cemetery on May 22, 2019.
