= Murray Sullivan =

Canadian football player (1925–2018)

Profile
- Position: Halfback

Personal information
- Born: March 14, 1925
- Died: November 11, 2018 (aged 93)
- Listed height: 6 ft 0 in (1.83 m)
- Listed weight: 190 lb (86 kg)

Career history
- 1945–1952: Toronto Argonauts

Awards and highlights
- Grey Cup champion (1945, 1946, 1947)

Murray Paul Sullivan (March 14, 1925 - November 11, 2018) was a Canadian professional football player who played for the Toronto Argonauts. He won the Grey Cup with them in 1945, 1946 and 1947. He was an alumnus of St. Michael's College, Toronto.
