= Kacem Kefi =

Tunisian singer and composer (1945–2018)

- Born: قاسم كافي; 5 August 1945; Sfax, Tunisia
- Died: 15 November 2018 (aged 73); Tunis, Tunisia
- Resting place: Jellaz Cemetery
- Occupations: Singer; Composer

Kacem Kefi (Arabic: قاسم كافي) (August 5, 1945 – November 15, 2018) was a Tunisian singer and composer.

== Career ==
Kefi was self-taught in music, and released a pop song in the early 1970s to jumpstart his career. He began at Radio Sfax with several other Tunisian singers, including Ahmed Hamza. He later joined a national choir troupe at Radio Tunis under Abdelhamid Ben Aljia. After some time singing, Kefi began to compose music.

Kefi also gave performances in Tel Aviv. He was criticized for the act.

Kefi invested himself in traditional Tunisian music. Some of his compositions include Yamma, Hal Kamoun mnayn ya nana, and Ala bent el khala. In total, he helped compose over 580 songs.

He was granted an award as officer of the Order of the Republic.

== Personal life ==
Kefi was married four times.

After his son's death in 2012, Kefi rarely produced new music.

Kefi died on 15 November 2018.
