= John Timmer =

American politician

Member of the South Dakota House of Representatives
- In office 1981–1992

Personal details
- Born: June 24, 1931 Rock County, Minnesota, U.S.
- Died: November 5, 2018 (aged 87)
- Party: Republican
- Education: Central College

John Timmer (June 24, 1931 – November 5, 2018) was an American politician. He served as a Republican member of the South Dakota House of Representatives.

== Life and career ==
Timmer was born in Rock County, Minnesota. He attended Central College.

Timmer was a businessman.

Timmer served in the South Dakota House of Representatives from 1981 to 1992.

Timmer died on November 5, 2018, at the age of 87.
