= Hamadjoda Adjoudji =

Cameroonian politician

Minister of Animal Husbandry, Fishing, and Animal Industries
- In office 7 July 1984 – December 2004
- President: Paul Biya

Personal details
- Born: 1937 Banyo, Cameroon
- Died: November 7, 2018 (aged 80–81)
- Party: Cameroon People's Democratic Movement
- Occupation: Politician, Veterinary Doctor

Hamadjoda Adjoudji (1937 – 7 November 2018) was a Cameroonian politician. He served in the government of Cameroon as Minister of Animal Husbandry, Fishing, and Animal Industries from 1984 to 2004. Most recently he was a Deputy Secretary-General of the Central Committee of the Cameroon People's Democratic Movement (RDPC).

== Biography ==
Hamadjoda was born in Banyo, located in what later became Adamawa Region. A veterinary doctor by profession, he was Head of the Provincial Sector of Animal Husbandry and Animal Industries from November 1972 to March 1974. Subsequently, he was Director-General of the Animal Production Development and Exploitation Company (SODEPA) from March 1974 to July 1984.

Appointed to the government by President Paul Biya as Minister of Animal Husbandry, Fishing, and Animal Industries on 7 July 1984, Hamadjoda remained in that position for over twenty years; he was eventually replaced in December 2004. He headed a ministry for longer than anyone else in Cameroon's history since it achieved its independence in 1960.

Following his departure from the government, Hamadjoda Adjoudji became chairman of the Board of the Public Contract Regulatory Agency (Agence de régulation des marchés publics, ARMP). President Paul Biya also appointed him as chairman of the Board of the University of Ngaoundere on 10 September 2005.

On 15 March 2007 President Biya additionally appointed Hamadjoda Adjoudji to a three-year term on the Coordination Committee of the National Anti-Corruption Commission. He and the other members of the commission were sworn in on 30 May 2007. Adjoudji died on 7 November 2018 at the age of 81.
