= Dorothy Drummond =

Geography educator (1928–2018)

Dorothy Weitz Drummond (1928–2018) was a geography educator and advocate. Drummond began her career as an editorial assistant for the Geographical Review, the journal of the American Geographical Society. She was the author of Holy Land, Whose Land: Modern Dilemma, Ancient Roots? and People on Earth: A World Geography

Drummond founded the Geography Educator's Network of Indiana (GENI) and served as President of the National Council of Geographic Education. In October 2010, she was the recipient of the George J. Miller Award for Distinguished Service presented at the Annual Meeting of the National Council for Geographic Education in Savannah, Georgia. Drummond taught Geography for over 30 years as an adjunct on the faculties of Indiana State University and St. Mary of the Woods College. Dorothy wrote grants that helped nearly 1,000 Indiana teachers attend summer geography workshops at The Woods.
