= Julie Kaatz =

Australian cricketer (died 2018)

Personal information
- Full name: Julie Gai Wiseman
- Died: 30 November 2018

Domestic team information
- Years: Team
- 1993/94–1998/99: Queensland

Career statistics
Competition	WFC	WLA
Matches	3	23
Runs scored	24	180
Batting average	8.00	9.00
100s/50s	0/0	0/0
Top score	13	33
Balls bowled	150	848
Wickets	0	14
Bowling average	–	32.64
5 wickets in innings	–	0
10 wickets in match	–	0
Best bowling	–	3/26
Catches/stumpings	0/–	6/–
- Source: CricketArchive, 3 July 2021

Julie Gai Wiseman (née Kaatz; died 30 November 2018) was an Australian cricketer. She represented her home state Queensland in three first-class matches and 23 List A matches during the 1990s.

Raised in Ipswich, Queensland, Kaatz joined the Queensland Police Service in 1994, eventually becoming a senior constable. She was married to Rod Wiseman. She died of cancer in 2018.
