= Garnik A. Karapetyan =

Armenian scientist and mathematician (1958–2018)

- Armenian: Գառնիկ Ալբերտի Կարապետյան
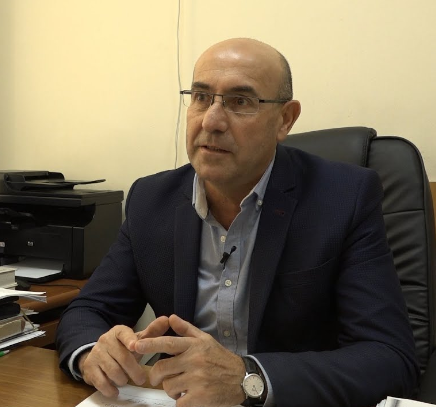
- Born: February 3, 1958; Gyumri, Armenia
- Died: November 29, 2018 (aged 60)
- Education: Mathematician, Doctor of Physico-mathematical sciences, Professor
- Alma mater: Yerevan State University
- Awards: Anania Shirakatsi medal
- Scientific career
- Fields: Mathematical analysis, Differential equations, Mathematical physics
- Institutions: Department of Mathematics and Mathematical Modeling, Institute of Mathematics and Informatics, Russian-Armenian University

Garnik A. Karapetyan (Armenian: Գառնիկ Ալբերտի Կարապետյան, 3 February 1958 – 29 November 2018, Armenia) was an Armenian scientist and mathematician. His main research was in the fields of mathematical analysis, differential equations and mathematical physics. At the time of his death he was a professor of mathematics at Russian-Armenian University in Yerevan, Armenia, and chaired the Department of Mathematics and Mathematical Modeling.

== Biography ==
Garnik A. Karapetyan was born on February 3, 1958, in Gyumri, Armenia. In 1975–1980 he was studying at the Faculty of Mechanics and Mathematics, Yerevan State University and got the degree of Bachelor of Science, receiving a diploma with honors. From October, 1980 to April, 1983 he was doing his PhD thesis at the Department of Differential Equations and Functional Analysis, Faculty of Mechanics and Mathematics, YSU. In 1983 the pre-defense of PhD thesis took place. At that time he was working as an assistant at the Department of Numerical Analysis, Faculty of Applied Mathematics at the same university.

In 1987 he received the academic rank of docent (associate professor) at the Department of Mathematics and Mathematical Modeling and in 1990–1994 he headed the Faculty of Informatics and Applied Mathematics as Deputy dean. In 1992 he was appointed Dean of the same Faculty. From 1994 to 2000 he was Scientific Secretary of the Faculty of Informatics and Applied Mathematics at Yerevan State University. Garnik A. Karapetyan often took part as a jury member at Mathematics Olympiads, and from 1997 to 1999 he was elected Chairman of the Mathematics Olympiad Committee of Armenia.

Later he was invited to another university in Yerevan, Armenia. From 2002 to May, 2018 he was Head of the Department of Mathematics and Mathematical Modeling, Russian-Armenian University. In January, 2007 he defenced his PhD thesis at the Specialized Council in Mathematics, YSU, and further on, in 2008 he qualified Professor at the Department of Mathematics and Mathematical Modeling, RAU. In 2008 Garnik A.Karapetyan received the title of Distinguished Professor at RAU. He continued his research in the related sphere and in 2008 he got the certificate of Doctor of Physico-mathematical Sciences in the Russian Federation and the academic rank of Professor of the Russian Federation. From 2008 to November, 2018 he was a member of the Scientific Council of RAU and that of Dissertation Council in Mathematics of the Republic of Armenia.

From 2015 to May, 2018 he was deputy director of the Institute of Mathematics and High Technology of the same university. Later in 2015 to November, 2018 he also was Director of the Applied Mathematics and Informatics program, RAU. In 2017 Garnik A.Karapetyan was awarded an Anania Shirakatsi Medal. From May, 2018 to November, 2018 when he died Garnik A.Karapetyan headed the Institute of Mathematics and Informatics at RAU being its director.

== Scientific activity ==
Main scientific papers are dedicated to differential equations, elliptic and hypoelliptic equations, the study of the properties of functions in different multianisotropic spaces, integral representations and embedding theorems for functions in multianisotropic spaces.

== Books ==
- Ghazaryan H.G, Hovhannisyan A.H, Harutyunyan T.N, Karapetyan G.A., Ordinary Differential Equations (textbook). Yerevan։ "Zangak-97", 2002. 320 pages.
- Ghazaryan H.G, Hovhannisyan A.H, Mamikonyan F.H., Karapetyan G.A., Ordinary Differential Equations (problem book). Yerevan։ "Zangak-97", 1988. 184 pages.
- Karapetyan G.A., Yeghiazaryan V.S., 300 RAU Entrance Exam Tests in Mathematics. Yerevan։ RAU Publishing House, 2006. 304 pages.
- Karapetyan G.A., Aghekyan G.V., Harutyunyan K.V., Hayrapetyan S.R., Algebra (mathematics manual for university applicants). Yerevan։ RAU Publishing House, 2007. 388 pages.
- Karapetyan G.A., Aghekyan G.V., Aramyan R.H, Dashtoyan L.L., Hayrapetyan S.R., RAU Entrance Exam Tests in Mathematics. Yerevan։ RAU Publishing House, 2008. 120 pages.
- Karapetyan G.A., Melkonyan A.A., Mikilyan M.A., Differential Equations with Examples and Problems (problem book). Yerevan։ RAU Publishing House, 2009. 235 pages.
- Karapetyan G.A., Margaryan V.N., Hayrapetyan S.R., Practice in Mathematical Analysis (problem book). Yerevan։ RAU Publishing House, 2010. 310 pages.
- Karapetyan G.A., Hayrapetyan S.R., Mathematical Analysis with Examples and Problems (problem book). Yerevan։ RAU Publishing House, 2014. 417 pages.

== Publications in scientific journals ==
- Ghazaryan H.G., Karapetyan G.A., Convergence of Galerkin approximations to the solution of the Dirichlet problem // DAN SSSR, vol. 264, No.2, 1982, pp. 291–294.
- Karapetyan G.A., Existence and solution behavior of one class of hypoelliptic equations // DAN Аrm. SSR, vol. 74, No.5, 1982, pp. 202–07.
- Karapetyan G.A., Solution of $\mu$-elliptic equations in the half-space // DAN Аrm. SSR, vol. 75, No.15, 1982, pp. 200–204.
- Karapetyan G.A., Theorems of Liouville and Phragmén–Lindelöf type for general regular equations // Izv. AN. Arm. SSR, ser. Math. 17, No.6, 1982, pp. 473–496.
- Hakobyan G.O., Karapetyan G.A., Estimates in Hölder spaces for solving quasi-elliptic equations // Mol. Nauch. Rab., YSU, 2 (38), 1982, pp. 47–59.
- Hakobyan G.O., Karapetyan G.A., Estimates of Schauder type for solving semi-elliptic equations with constant coefficients // Inter. Collection, ser. Math., No.2, 1984, pp. 5–13.
- Karapetyan G.A., Existence and uniqueness of the solution of the Dirichlet problem for hypoelliptic equations in unbounded domains // Proceedings of YSU, 151, No.2, 1982, pp. 3–12.
- Karapetyan G.A., On the behavior of one class of hypoelliptic equations in unbounded domains // Mol. Nauch. Rab., YSU, 2 (36), 1982, pp. 5–13.
- Karapetyan G.A., Solution of semi-elliptic equations in the half-space // Tr. MIAN SSSR, vol. 170, 1984, pp. 119–138.
- Ghazaryan. H.G., Karapetyan G.A., On the convergence of Galerkin approximations to the solution of the Dirichlet problem // Mathematical Collection, 124 (166), 1984, No.3 (7), pp. 291–306.
- Karapetyan G.A., The Galerkin method for one general class of hypoelliptic equations // Inter. Collection, ser. Math., No.4, 1986, pp. 93–107.
- Karapetyan G.A., Arakelyan M.Z., Theorems of Liouville and Phragmén–Lindelöf type for semi-elliptic equations with general initial conditions // Inter. Collection, ser. Math., No.4, 1986, pp. 81–93.
- Karapetyan G.A., On one class of degenerate regular equations in the half-space // Izv. AN Аrm. SSR, ser. Math., 21, 1986, No.5, pp. 472–487.
- Karapetyan G.A., Quasilinear boundary value problems for regular equations in unbounded domains // Izv.AN. SSR, ser. Math., 23, 1988, No.1, pp. 22–38.
- Karapetyan G.A., Smooth dependence on the parameter of the solution of regular equations // Proceedings of YSU, 8, 1988, pp. 21–29.
- Karapetyan G.A., On the stabilization at infinity to a polynomial of solutions for one class of regular equations // Tr. MIAN SSSR, 187, 1989, pp. 116–129.
- Karapetyan G.A., On the stabilization at infinity to a polynomial of solutions for one class of hypoelliptic equations // Fourth conference on differential equations and applications, Rousse 89, Bulgaria, pp. 144.
- Karapetyan G.A., Regular equations depending on a parameter // Izv. AN. SSR, vol. 25, 1990, No.2, pp. 192–202.
- Karapetyan G.A., Inner estimates for semi-elliptic equations with small parameter // Dif. Eq. and Func. Analysis, 1993, Yerevan, pp. 100–105.
- Karapetyan G.A., Petrosyan A.G., Solution of degenerate semi-elliptic equations in the half-space // Proceedings of YSU, No.1, 1998, pp. 13–22.
- Karapetyan G.A., Sardaryan V.T., Krmzyan A.P., Eigenvalue problem for self-adjointhypoelliptic operators // Proceedings of the NAS of Armenia, ser. Math., vol. 34, No.2, 1999, pp. 37–58.
- Karapetyan G.A., Dallakyan G.V., Approximation of the solutions of semi-elliptic equations in R^n // Proceedings of the NAS of Armenia, ser. Math., vol. 34, No. 4, 1999, pp. 31–43.
- Karapetyan G.A., Multiplicative inequalities of Gagliardo–Nirenberg type for W_{p}^{N} spaces // ”Issledovano v Rossii”. /zhurnal.ape.relarn.ru/articles/2004, pp. 634–644.
- Karapetyan G.A., The smooth dependence on parameter of solutions of regular equations // Transactions of A. Razmadze Mathematical Institute, 2005, v.137, pp. 6–15.
- Karapetyan G.A., Galiardo — Nirenberg general inequalities for multianisotrop spaces // Transactions of A. Razmadze Mathematical Institute, 2006, v.142. pp. 8–18.
- Karapetyan G.A., Darbinyan A.A., Index of the semi-elliptic operator with variable coefficients of special type // Collection of Scientific Articles. Annual Conference (28 November – 2 December 2006). Physical, mathematical and natural sciences. Yerevan. RAU, 20–24, 2007.
- Karapetyan G.A., Darbinyan A.A., On the index of the semi-elliptic operator in R^n // Proceedings of the NAS of Armenia. Math., vol.42, №5, 33–50, 2007. (Englishtranslation; J. of Contemporary Math. Analysis).
- Karapetyan G.A., Darbinyan A.A., Index of the semi-elliptic operator with constant coefficients in a domain // Collection of Scientific Articles. Annual Conference (3–7 December 2007). Physical, mathematical and natural sciences. Yerevan. RAU, 45–53, 2008.
- Karapetyan G.A., Darbinyan A.A., Noethericity of the regular operator with constant coefficients in a domain // Proceedings of A. Razmadze Mathematical Institute, Tbilisi, vol.146, 57 – 66, 2008.
- Karapetyan G.A., Darbinyan A.A., Noethericity of the semi-elliptic operator with constant coefficients in a domain // Proceedings of YSU, No..3,16 – 24.2008.
- Karapetyan G.A., Darbinyan A.A., Noethericity of the regular operator with constant coefficients in R^n // Scientific conference dedicated to the 80thanniversary of the academician Sergey Mergelyan. (20–21 May 2008). pp. 27–28. Theses.
- Tananyan H.G., Karapetyan G.A., Degenerate semi-elliptic equations with constant coefficients in the half-space // Collection of Scientific Articles. Annual Conference (5–10 December 2008). Physical, mathematical and natural sciences. Yerevan. RAU, 27–30, 2008.
- Tananyan H.G., Karapetyan G.A., Degeneration of Semielliptic Equations with Constant Coefficients in Rectangular Parallelepipeds // Journal of Contemporary Mathematical Analysis (Armenian Academy of Sciences) Vol. 45, Number 2 (2010), 82–93.
- Karapetyan G.A., Darbinyan A.A., Index of the regular operator with constant coefficients in a domain // 3rd Russian-Armenian Conference on Mathematical Physics, Complex Analysis and Related Topics, 91–94, 2010.
- Tananyan H.G., Karapetyan G.A., The small parameter method for regular hypoelliptic equations with variable coefficients in the half-space // 3rd Russian-Armenian Conference on Mathematical Physics, Complex Analysis and Related Topics, Yerevan, 2010, pp. 95–99.
- Tananyan H.G., Karapetyan G.A., The Application of Newton's diagram method in the method of small parameter for regular hypoelliptic equations in the half-space // Collection of Scientific Articles. Annual Conference (6–10 December 2010). Physical, mathematical and natural sciences. Yerevan. RAU, 106–112, 2011.
- Tananyan H.G., Karapetyan G.A., The Small Parameter Method for Linear Differential Regular Equations in Unbounded Domains // Proceeding of the ISAAC Conference. Moscow, August 22–27, 2011.
- Karapetyan G.A., Darbinyan A.A., Index of the semi-elliptic operator with variable coefficients // Collection of Scientific Articles. 6th Annual Conference (5–9 December 2011). Physical, mathematical and natural sciences. Yerevan. RAU, 5–11, 2011
- Tananyan H.G., Karapetyan G.A., The small parameter method for the approximation of the eigenvalues of hypoelliptic operators in the half-space // Collection of Scientific Articles. 6th Annual Conference (5–9 December 2011). Physical, mathematical and natural sciences. Yerevan. RAU, 43–51, 2011
- Tananyan H.G., Karapetyan G.A., The small parameter method for regular linear differential equations on unbounded domains // Math. Journal, ISSN, 2077-9878, v. 4, No. 1, 2013.
- Karapetyan G.A., Integral representation through the hypoelliptic operator // 9th Annual Conference, RAU, pp. 5–11, 2–6 December 2014.
- Karapetyan G.A., On the stabilization at infinity to a polynomial of solutions of regular equations. Theory of operators and its applications // International Conference, Rostov-on-Don, 25.04.15 – 29.04.15.
- Karapetyan G.A., Integral representation through the differentiation operator and embedding theorems for multianisotropic spaces // International Conference Harmonic Analysis and Approximations, VI, Tsaghkadzor, Armenia, pp. 46–48, 12–18 September 2015.
- Karapetyan G.A., Saribekyan N.S., Spectral stability of higher order semi-elliptic operators // Proceedings of the NAS of Armenia, Math., vol. 51, №1, pp. 21–37, 2016.
- Karapetyan G.A., Integral Representations of Functions and Embedding Theorems for Multianisotropic Spaces on the Plane with One Anisotropy Vertex // Journal of Contemporary Mathematical Analysis, 2016, Vol. 51, No. 6, pp. 269—281.
- Karapetyan G.A., Arakelyan M.K., Estimation of multianisotropic kernels and its application to the embedding theorems // AMU, Annual Session 2016, Dedicated to the 110th Anniversary of Artashes Shahinyan, Yerevan, pp. 68–69, 31.05.16 – 02.06.16.
- Karapetyan G.A., Petrosyan H.A., Embedding theorems for the n-dimensional multianisotropic spaces with two points of anisotropicity // AMU, Annual Session 2016, Dedicated to the 110th Anniversary of Artashes Shahinyan, Yerevan, pp. 70–71, 31.05.16 – 02.06.16.
- Karapetyan G.A., Integral representation of functions and embedding theorems for multianisotropic spaces for the three-dimensional case // Eurasian Mathematical Journal, ISSN, v.7, n.4, (2016), 19–39.
- Karapetyan G.A., Arakelyan M.K., Estimation of multianisotropic kernels and their application to the embedding theorems // Transactions of A. Razmadze Mathematical Institute 171, (2017), 48–56.
- Karapetyan G.A., Integral representation and embedding theorems for n-dimensional multianisotropic spaces with one vertex of anisotropicity // Siberian Mathematical Journal, v.58, n.3, 445–460, 2017.
- Karapetyan G.A., Petrosyan H.A., Embedding theorems for multianisotropic spaces with two vertices of anisotropicity // Proceedings of the YSU, Physics & Mathematics, 2017, Volume 51, Issue 1, Pages 29–37.
- Karapetyan G.A., Petrosyan H.A., About the solvability of regular hypoelliptic equations in R^n // AMU, Annual Session 2017, Yerevan, pp. 40–42, 29.05.17 – 31.05.17.
- Karapetyan G.A., An Integral Representation and Embedding Theorems in the Plane for Multianisotropic Spaces // Journal of Contemporary Mathematical Analysis (Armenian Academy of Sciences), 2017, Vol. 52, No. 6, pp. 261—269.
- Karapetyan G.A., Petrosyan H.A. On Solvability of Regular Hypoelliptic Equations in R^n // Journal of Contemporary Mathematical Analysis (Armenian Academy of Sciences), 2018, Vol. 53, No. 4, 187-200.
- Karapetyan G.A., Arakelyan M. K. Embedding Theorems for General Multianisotropic Spaces // Mathematical Notes, 2018, Vol. 104, No. 3, 422-438.
- Karapetyan G.A., Khachaturyan M. A. Limiting Embedding Theorems for Multianisotropic Functional Spaces // Journal of Contemporary Mathematical Analysis (Armenian Academy of Sciences), 2019, Vol. 54, No. 2, 103-111.
