= Daphne Bugental =

American psychologist

- Born: January 31, 1928
- Died: November 25, 2018 (aged 90)
- Citizenship: American
- Occupation: Professor of Psychology
- Awards: Kurt Lewin Memorial Award

Academic background
- Education: University of California, Los Angeles

Daphne Blunt Bugental (January 31, 1928 – November 25, 2018) was a psychologist known for her research on parent-child relationships, infant and child maltreatment, and family violence. At the time of her death, she was professor emerita of Psychology at the University of California, Santa Barbara.

== Awards ==
Bugental was awarded the 2003 Kurt Lewis Memorial Award from the Society for the Psychological Study of Social Issues. Her award address titled Thriving in the Face of Childhood Adversity described her program of research on the experiences of children growing up with medical or physical disorders, their increased risk of parental neglect and/or abuse, and parental investments.

Her other awards included the 1996 UC Presidential Award for Excellence in Supporting Undergraduate Research, and the 1997 Research of the Decade Award from the Santa Barbara County Health Care Services.

== Biography ==
Bugental was born on January 31, 1928, in Santa Barbara, California. She attended the University of California, Los Angeles where completed her Bachelor of Arts degree in 1952 and Ph.D. in Personality and Social Psychology in 1964.

Bugental joined the Department of Psychology at University of California, Santa Barbara in 1974. She served as Area Head of Developmental and Evolutionary Psychology and co-director of the Interdisciplinary Program in Human Development. Bugental engaged in community leadership as part of the Steering Committee of The Family Partnership, a network of Santa Barbara agencies focused on child abuse prevention. She worked closely with the agency Child Abuse Listening and Mediating (CALM) for two decades.

Bugental's research was funded by the National Science Foundation and the National Institute of Mental Health.

== Research ==
Bugental's research program focused on parent-child relationships, especially those involving young children with medical conditions who were vulnerable to abuse. Much of her work focused on identifying family situations associated with heightened risk of child abuse. Her research team found that mothers who manifested a sense of powerlessness were more likely to demonstrate harsh or abusive tactics with “at risk” infants.

Bugental and her colleague Alex Schwartz conducted a randomized clinical trial aimed at preventing child mistreatment of medically at-risk infants. Families that received the cognitive intervention exhibited safer homes with decreased rates of corporal punishment and fewer reported incidents of child injury as compared to families that received home visitations without the intervention component.

== Publications ==
- Bugental, D. B. (2000). Acquisition of the algorithms of social life: A domain-based approach. Psychological Bulletin, 126(2), 187–219.
- Bugental, D. B., Blue, J., & Cruzcosa, M. (1989). Perceived control over caregiving outcomes: Implications for child abuse. Developmental Psychology, 25(4), 532–539.
- Bugental, D. B., Ellerson, P. C., Lin, E. K., Rainey, B., Kokotovic, A., & O'Hara, N. (2002). A cognitive approach to child abuse prevention. Journal of Family Psychology, 16(3), 243–258.
- Bugental, D. B., & Johnston, C. (2000). Parental and child cognitions in the context of the family. Annual Review of Psychology, 51(1), 315–344.
- Bugental, D. E., Kaswan, J. W., & Love, L. R. (1970). Perception of contradictory meanings conveyed by verbal and nonverbal channels. Journal of Personality and Social Psychology, 16(4), 647–655.
- Bugental, D. B., Shennum, W. A., & Shaver, P. (1984). "Difficult" children as elicitors and targets of adult communication patterns: An attributional-behavioral transactional analysis. Monographs of the Society for Research in Child Development, 49(1), 1-79.
