= Turres in Numidia =

Africa Roman map

Turres in Numidia is a titular see in Numidia of the Roman Catholic Church.

The diocese of Turres in Numidia was located in the Roman province of Numidia, Roman North Africa, but ceased to function in the 7th century with the Muslim conquest of the Maghreb. The location of the cathedra and seat of the Bishopric remains unknown, though thought to be in present-day Tunisia or Algeria.

The current bishop is Francisco de Paula Victor of Brazil.
