= Luigi Rossi di Montelera =

Italian company manager and politician

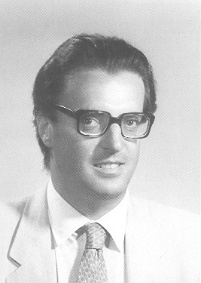

Member of the Chamber of Deputies
- In office 5 July 1976 – 22 April 1992

Personal details
- Born: 14 May 1946 Turin, Italy
- Died: 15 November 2018 (aged 72) Aosta, Italy
- Cause of death: Heart attack
- Party: Christian Democracy
- Education: University of Turin
- Occupation: Company manager, politician

Luigi Rossi di Montelera (14 May 1946 – 15 November 2018) was an Italian company manager and politician from the Christian Democracy.

== Biography ==
A member of the noble Rossi di Montelera family from Piedmont, Luigi Rossi di Montelera graduated in Law at the University of Turin.

=== Kidnapping ===
On 14 November 1973, at the age of 27, Rossi di Montelera was kidnapped by a group of bandits of the Corleone Mafia family, led by Luciano Leggio, and held as a prisoner in the bunker of a farmhouse in Treviglio, near Bergamo. He was freed by the agents of the Guardia di Finanza on 14 March 1974, after a long and complex investigative activity.

=== Managerial career ===
Rossi di Montelera worked mainly as a manager in private companies in the wine sector.

In 1970 he began working as a manager for Martini & Rossi, while between 1995 and 2008 he was president of the Bacardi-Martini company. From 2003 to 2008 he was a member of the board of directors of the General Confederation of Italian Industry and from 2004 to 2008 president of the Piedmont division of Confindustria. Rossi di Montelera has also been a member of the board of directors of the Saving Banks of Turin.

=== Political career ===
Rossi di Montelera joined the Christian Democracy, with which he has been elected city councilor in Val della Torre and then to the Chamber of Deputies from 1976 to 1992.

From 30 July 1987 to 21 July 1989, Rossi di Montelera has been appointed Undersecretary at the Minister of Tourism in the Goria Cabinet and the De Mita Cabinet.

=== Death ===
Rossi di Montelera died of a heart attack on 15 November 2018, at the age of 72, while he was in Aosta for a hunt.
