= Albert Ramassamy =

French politician (1923–2018)

Senator from Réunion
- In office 25 September 1985 – 2 February 1987
- Preceded by: Louis Virapoullé
- Succeeded by: Paul Bénard
- Parliamentary group: Socialist

Personal details
- Born: 13 November 1923 Réunion, France
- Died: 2 November 2018 (aged 94)

Albert Ramassamy (13 November 1923 – 2 November 2018) was a French politician.

== Biography ==
Born in Reunion to a family of Indian Tamils who had arrived on the island from India as indentured labourers, Ramassamy worked as a professor before being elected as Senator for Réunion in 1983.

He was not reelected in 1992, and had previously served on the Committee on Constitutional Laws, Legislation, Universal Suffrage, Regulation and General Administration.

Besides his political career, Ramassamy wrote three books:

- La Réunion : décolonisation et intégration (1987)(OCLC number 492952088)
- La Réunion face à l'avenir (1973)(OCLC number 492951767)
- La Réunion : les problèmes posés par l'intégration (1973)(OCLC number 492933221)
