= Dennis D. Buss =

American electrical engineer

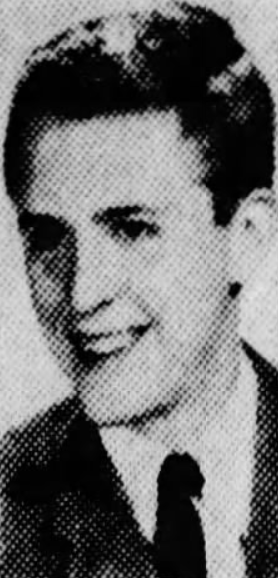
- Buss in 1963
- Born: Dennis Darcy Buss; July 11, 1942; Gainesville, Florida, U.S.
- Died: November 25, 2018 (aged 76)
- Education: Massachusetts Institute of Technology
- Occupation: Electrical engineer

Dennis Darcy Buss (July 11, 1942 – November 25, 2018) was an American electrical engineer.

== Life and career ==
Buss was born in Gainesville, Florida, the son of Janet and Frank Buss. He grew up in Rochester, Vermont, and attended the Massachusetts Institute of Technology. After completing his PhD, he joined Texas Instruments, where he spent the better part of his career.

In 1985, Buss was named a fellow of the Institute of Electrical and Electronics Engineers, for his "leadership in VLSI technology research and development".

Buss died while on a birdwatching trip in rural Equador on November 25, 2018, at the age of 76.
