= Roger Hamelin =

Canadian football player (1941–2018)

Profile
- Position: Tackle

Personal information
- Born: April 27, 1941; Winnipeg, Manitoba, Canada
- Died: November 25, 2018 (aged 77)
- Listed height: 6 ft 2 in (1.88 m)
- Listed weight: 235 lb (107 kg)

Career history
- 1961–1969: Winnipeg Blue Bombers

Awards and highlights
- Grey Cup champion (1961, 1962)

Roger Hamelin (April 27, 1941 - November 25, 2018) was a Canadian professional football player who played for the Winnipeg Blue Bombers. He won the Grey Cup with them in 1961 and 1962. He is a member of the Football Manitoba Hall of Fame, inducted 2013. He died on November 25, 2018.
