= Jens Büchner =

German singer (1969–2018)

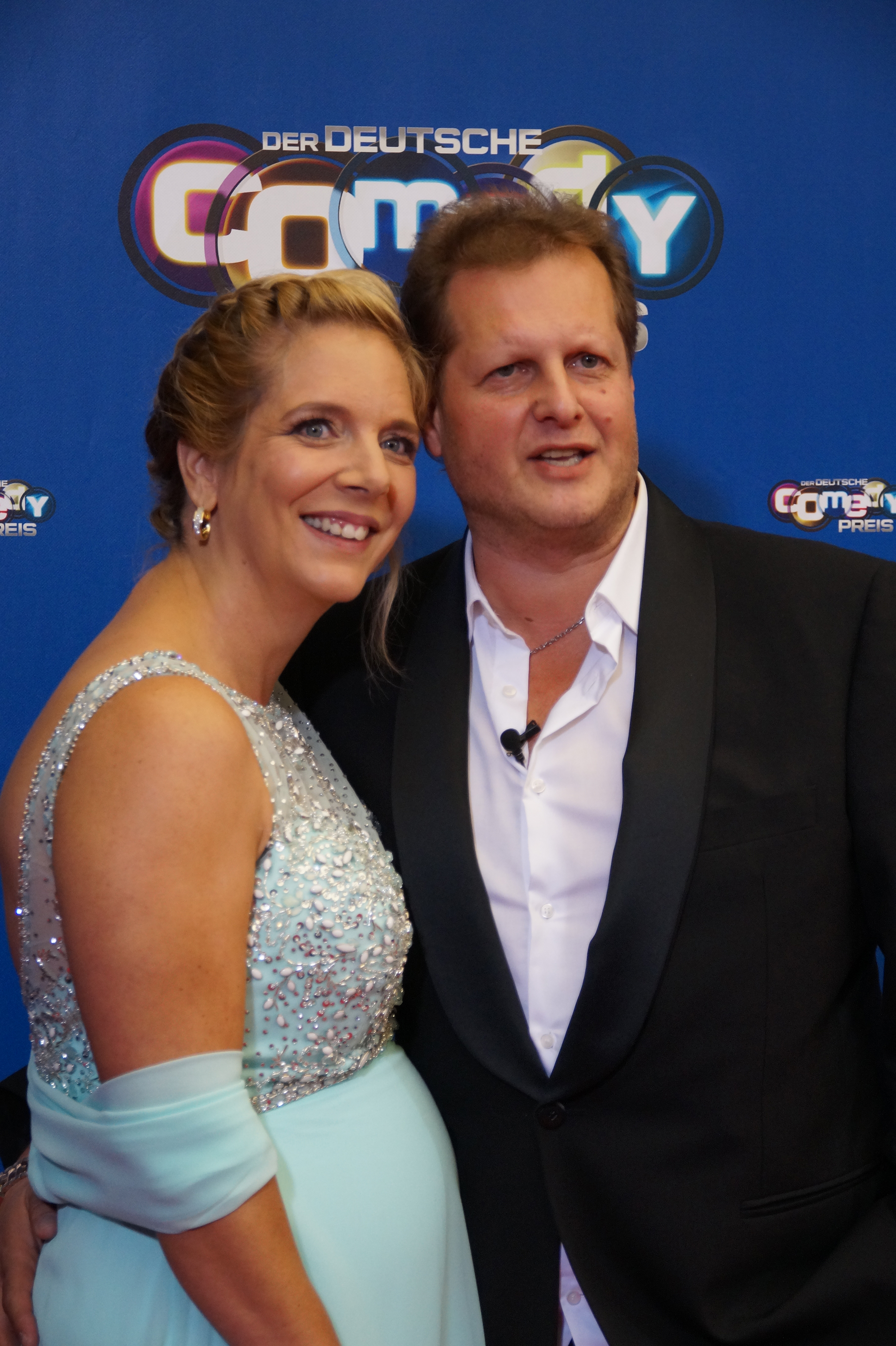
Büchner with his wife Daniela in 2016

Jens "Malle-Jens" Büchner (30 October 1969 – 17 November 2018) was a German schlager singer.

== Early life ==
Büchner grew up in the village of Eythra at Leipzig. The family moved to Bad Schmiedeberg and Büchner finished the tenth-grade there. He completed an apprenticeship as a locksmith. He was drafted for military service, finishing in 1990. Büchner worked for GDR state security from 1987 to 1990 as a member of the regimental guard. In the 1990s, he traveled to Florida and California. In Germany he worked at a gas station and in the catering industry. In 2004 he completed training as a financial economist. In addition to training, he worked as a freelancer for financial services firm Deutsche Proventus AG Bremen.

== Career ==
In November 2010, Büchner emigrated with his then partner Jennifer Matthias and their son from Bad Schmiedeberg to Mallorca . Since 2011 he played part in the reality TV show Goodbye Deutschland. In Cala Millor, the couple opened the boutique "Store & More", which Matthias operated alone after the couple separated in 2013. Büchner subsequently followed various career paths. He worked briefly as a kitchen assistant in the Bistro "King of Mallorca" in Santa Ponça.

== Death ==
Büchner died on 17 November 2018 at the age of 49 in a hospital in Majorca as a result of lung cancer.
