= Howard Weyers =

American football player and coach (1934–2018)

Biographical details
- Born: March 29, 1934; Pittsburgh, Pennsylvania, U.S.
- Died: November 14, 2018 (aged 84); East Lansing, Michigan, U.S.
- Education: Thiel College

Playing career
- 1952–1956: Thiel

Coaching career (HC unless noted)
- 1973–1976: Michigan State (assistant)

Howard Weyers (March 29, 1934 – November 14, 2018) was an American football player and assistant coach. He served as assistant coach at Rutgers University, Columbia University, University of Pittsburgh, Miami University, and Michigan State University (1973–1976).

Weyers graduated from Thiel College in 1956.

== NCAA violations and resignation ==
Weyers left Michigan State amid accusations of recruiting violations by the NCAA.

== Weyco smoking ban ==
Weyers was again at the center of controversy when his company Weyco banned smoking for all of its 200 employees in January 2005. The strict no-smoking policy imposed random screenings, and termination upon failure of a test.
