= Hiromu Fujii =

Japanese baseball player

- Infielder, Outfielder
- Born: September 29, 1935; Fukuyama, Hiroshima, Empire of Japan
- Died: November 9, 2018 (aged 83)
- Batted: Right Threw: Right

Central League debut
- 1955, for the Hiroshima Carp

Last appearance
- 1969, for the Hiroshima Toyo Carp

Hiromu Fujii (Japanese: 藤井 弘; 29 September 1935 – 9 November 2018) was a baseball player from Japan. He was a three-time All-Star for the Hiroshima Toyo Carp.
