= Robert Weber (engineer) =

American engineer and researcher (1942–2018)

Robert J. Weber (1942 in Stout, Iowa – 21 November 2018 in Des Moines) was an American engineer and researcher who specialized in microwave engineering, device fabrication, fiber optics, and sensor design. He was professor emeritus of Iowa State University‘s Department of Electrical and Computer Engineering and a life fellow of the Institute of Electrical and Electronics Engineers (IEEE).

Weber received his Ph.D. from Iowa State in 1967. He worked for Rockwell Collins for 25 years before becoming a professor in 1988. He retired in 2010.
