= 2018 in China =

- Decades: 1990s; 2000s; 2010s; 2020s
- See also: Other events of 2018; History of China • Timeline • Years

The following lists events that happened during 2018 in China.

== Incumbents ==
- General Secretary of the Communist Party – Xi Jinping
- President – Xi Jinping
- Vice President
  - Li Yuanchao (until 17 March 2018)
  - Wang Qishan (from 17 March 2018)
- Premier – Li Keqiang
- Congress chairman
  - Zhang Dejiang (until 17 March 2018)
  - Li Zhanshu (from 17 March 2018)
- Consultative Conference chairman
  - Yu Zhengsheng (until 14 March 2018)
  - Wang Yang (from 14 March 2018)

=== Governors ===
- Governor of Anhui Province – Li Guoying
- Governor of Fujian Province – Tang Dengjie
- Governor of Gansu Province – Tang Renjian
- Governor of Guangdong Province – Ma Xingrui
- Governor of Guizhou Province – Shen Yiqin
- Governor of Hainan Province – Shen Xiaoming
- Governor of Hebei Province – Xu Qin
- Governor of Heilongjiang Province – Lu Hao (until March), Wang Wentao (starting May)
- Governor of Henan Province – Chen Run'er
- Governor of Hubei Province – Wang Xiaodong
- Governor of Hunan Province – Xu Dazhe
- Governor of Jiangsu Province – Wu Zhenglong
- Governor of Jiangxi Province – Liu Qi (politician, born 1957) (until August), Yi Lianhong (starting August)
- Governor of Jilin Province – Liu Guozhong (until 4 January), Jing Junhai (starting 4 January)
- Governor of Liaoning Province – Tang Yijun
- Governor of Qinghai Province – Wang Jianjun (until August), Liu Ning (starting August)
- Governor of Shaanxi Province – Hu Heping (until 4 January), Liu Guozhong (starting 4 January)
- Governor of Shandong Province – Gong Zheng
- Governor of Shanxi Province – Lou Yangsheng
- Governor of Sichuan Province – Yin Li
- Governor of Yunnan Province – vacant
- Governor of Zhejiang Province – Yuan Jiajun

== Events ==
=== January ===
- January 2 – Shaanxi, Henan, Hubei, Anhui, Jiangsu and other places have been affected by heavy snow or blizzard, which has damaged housing, agriculture and power infrastructure in some areas, and traffic has been blocked.
- January 5 – As of 11:00, Blizzard snow caused 10 deaths in 5 provinces in Central China and East China, more than 567,000 people were affected.

=== February ===
- February 15 – The CCTV Spring Festival Gala, which airs to millions around the country, sparks widespread criticism and faces accusations of racism after featuring a comedy sketch that featured an Asian actress in blackface and with exaggerated buttocks.

=== March ===
- March 5 – 13th National People's Congress was opened.
- March 11 – National People's Congress approves a constitutional change that removes term limits for its leaders, granting General Secretary Xi Jinping the status of "President for life".
- March 28 – North Korea's supreme leader Kim Jong-un met with China's paramount leader Xi Jinping in Beijing on Kim's first reported trip outside the country since taking power.
- March – scheduled date for the first plenary session to be held by the 13th National People's Congress

=== May ===
- May 2 – Censorship in China: Chinese authorities have blocked the popular British children's cartoon, Peppa Pig on its Douyin (TikTok) social media service for "subversive" content. The service had over 30,000 viral videos of Peppa Pig on its platform.
- May 8 – former Chinese Communist Party official Sun Zhengcai sentenced to life imprisonment for corruption.

=== June ===
- June – planned launch of the lunar exploration mission Chang'e 4.

=== August ===
- August 18 to 19 - Tropical Storm Rumbia caused heavy rain in several province, causing 53 fatalities, including 2 policeman who were washed away by the flood.

=== September ===
- September 15 — the annual routine Air Defense Alert originally scheduled for Guangzhou was cancelled.
- September 16 — Typhoon Mangkhut gradually approached Guangdong. Urban public transportation in Guangzhou and Shenzhen is also affected, in which part of the Guangzhou Metro is out of service; in Shenzhen, buses, subways, and taxis are all out of service, and pure electric taxi charging stations are also closed.

=== October ===
- October 3 – The PRC authorities ordered Fan Bingbing and the companies she controls to pay around 883 million yuan (around US$129 million) in taxes, fines, and penalties. She also broke silence on her Weibo account by apologizing for what she had done.

=== November ===
- November 13 — "Great Change – A Large-Scale Exhibition Celebrating the 40th Anniversary of Reform and Opening-up" was grandly opened at the National Museum of the People’s Republic of China. On the afternoon of the same day, Xi Jinping came here to visit the exhibition, reviewing the glorious course of the 40 years of reform and opening up, and proclaiming the firm determination to carry out reform and opening up.

== Popular culture ==
=== Film ===
- List of Chinese films of 2018

== Deaths ==
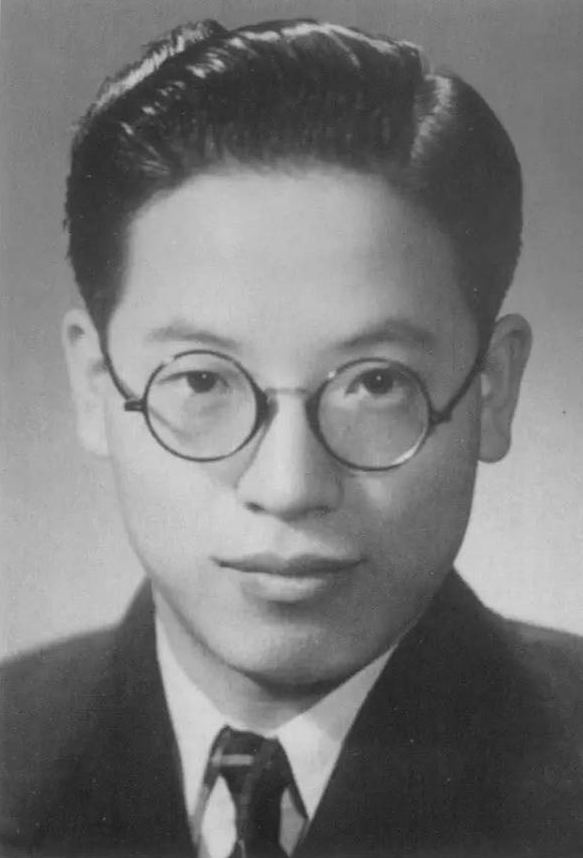
Su Bai

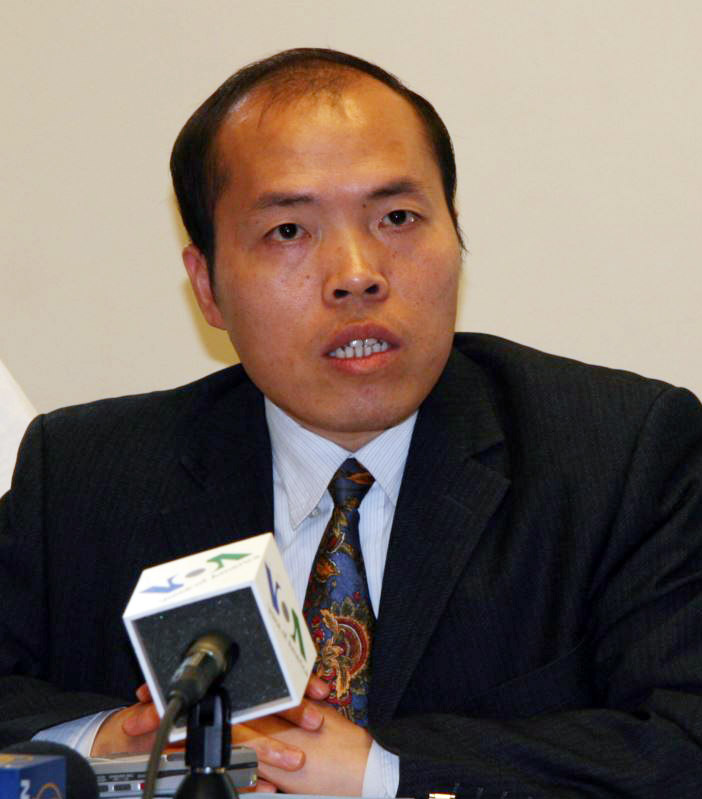
Li Boguang

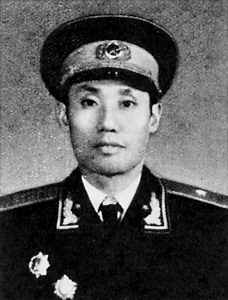
Li Yaowen

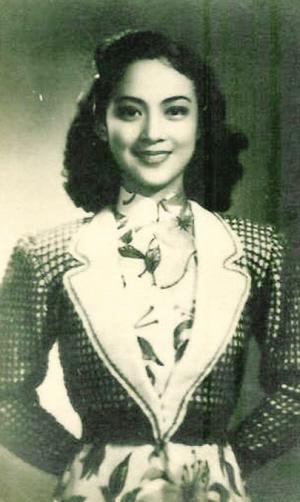
Wang Danfeng

=== January ===
- 2 January – Ye Zhemin, 93, art historian.
- 9 January
  - Guan De, 85, aircraft designer.
  - Yuan Chengye, 93, chemist.
- 16 January – Liu Zhonghua, 101, major general.
- 17 January – He Yousheng, 86, hydrodynamicist.
- 18 January – Ding Guangquan, 73, comedian.

=== February ===
- 1 February – Su Bai, 95, archaeologist.
- 11 February – Sun Shu, 84, geologist.
- 12 February – Luo Haocai, 83, politician and legal scholar.
- 19 February – Zhang Junsheng, 81, optical engineer, politician, and academic administrator.
- 24 February – Yang Rudai, 91, politician.
- 25 February – Dai Fudong, 89, architect.
- 26 February – Li Boguang, 49, legal scholar and human rights activist.
- 28 February – Chen Xiaolu, 71, businessman and princeling.

=== March ===
- 3 March
  - Lin Hu, 90, air force general.
  - Yao Xian, 90, air force general.
- 7 March – Hao Bailin, 83, physicist.
- 15 March
  - Huang Wenpan, 22, swimmer.
  - Ling Yun, 100, politician.
- 18 March – Li Ao, 82, Chinese-Taiwanese writer and politician

=== April ===
- 4 April – Li Zhengyou, 82, agronomist and politician, Vice-Governor of Yunnan Province.
- 7 April
  - Ai Xing, 93, mechanical engineer.
  - Li Zhen, 93, politician, Chairman of the Shandong People's Congress.
  - Wang Wusheng, 73, photographer.
- 10 April
  - Li Dawei, 47, director.
  - Li Yaowen, 99, politician, general and diplomat.
  - Wu Nansheng, 95, politician.
  - Yang Gui, 89, politician, chief designer of the Red Flag Canal.
- 11 April – Li Tian, 79, aerodynamicist and aircraft designer.
- 12 April – Hu Chengzhi, 100, palaeontologist and palaeoanthropologist.
- 16 April – Lü Chuanzan, 85, politician, Chairman of Hebei Provincial People's Congress (1993–1998).
- 20 April – Nie Bichu, 90, politician.

=== May ===
- 2 May – Wang Danfeng, 93, actress
- 10 May – Wu Dechang, 90, toxicologist.
- 18 May – Sun Fuling, 96, business executive and politician
- 19 May – Zhengzhang Shangfang, 84, linguist
- 22 May – Lu Chunling, 96, flautist
- 28 May – Lin Zunqi, 75, physicist and specialist in solid-state laser
- 30 May – Li Zaiping, 92, molecular biologist

=== June ===
- 8 June – Liu Jianfu, 100, politician
- 9 June – Zhang Junzhao, 65, film director and screenwriter (One and Eight, The Shining Arc).
- 17 June – Zhao Nanqi, 91, general and politician
- 20 June – Hu Wei, 97, general
- 21 June – Yan Jizhou, 100, film director
- 22 June – Ai Weiren, 86, Chinese soldier

=== July ===
- 2 July – Liu Boli, 87, nuclear chemist.
- 3 July – Wang Jian, 56, businessman
- 8 July – Liu Tonghua, 88, pathologist.
- 11 July
  - Wu Bing'an, 89, ethnologist
  - Ji Chunhua, actor (b. 1961)
  - Liu Zhenhua, general (b. 1921)
- 18 July – Ling Li, writer and historian (b. 1942).
- 26 July – Sha Yexin, 79, playwright
- 27 July – Song Yuquan, 85, materials scientist.
- 29 July – Lin Xiangdi, 84, optoelectronic engineer, President of the Southwest University of Science and Technology.
- 30 July – Zhou Yaohe, 91, materials scientist.
- 31 July – Su Hongxi, 103, surgeon.

=== August ===
- 1 August – Cui Xiuwen, artist.
- 3 August – Zhang Baosheng, 57–58, qigong master.
- 7 August – Liu Guangding, 88, geologist.
- 11 August – Li Chaoyi, 84, neurobiologist.
- 12 August – Ma Jin, 83, geologist.
- 19 August – Hong Chaosheng, 97, physicist.

=== September ===
- 1 September – Chen Xian, 98, politician.
- 7 September
  - Chang Baohua, xiangsheng actor (b. 1930).
  - Yang Side, general (b. 1921)
  - Sheng Zhongguo, 77, violinist
- 8 September – Yang Zhenya, 90, diplomat
- 11 September – Shan Tianfang, pingshu actor (b. 1934).
- 13 September – Lin Hujia, politician (b. 1916).
- 15 September – Zhu Xu, 88, actor
- 16 September
  - Min Naiben, 83, physicist and materials scientist.
  - Wang Guofa, 72, politician
- 19 September – Buren Bayaer, 58, singer and journalist.
- 20 September – Wang Mengshu, 79, tunnel and railway engineer
- 21 September – Xu Delong, 66, materials scientist, President of Xi'an University of Architecture and Technology.
- 23 September – Liu Jie, 103, politician
- 28 September
  - Zang Tianshuo, 54, musician
  - Shi Shengjie, 65, xiangsheng comedian

=== October ===
- 3 October – Fang Nanjiang, 75, novelist and general
- 5 October – Lin Xiao, politician (b. 1920).
- 9 October – Lü Junchang, 53, palaeontologist
- 16 October – Ismail Amat, 83, politician
- 18 October – Li Lianda, 84, pharmacologist
- 20 October – Zheng Xiaosong, 59, politician and diplomat
- 25 October
  - Chen Tiemei, 83, archaeologist
  - Li Yong, 50, television host
- 27 October – Yang Ziyuan, 90, politician
- 29 October
  - Wang Guangying, 99, entrepreneur and politician
  - Li Xifan, 90, literary scholar and redologist.
- 30 October – Jin Yong, 94, a Chinese wuxia novelist and newspaper founder.
- 31 October
  - Chen Chuangtian, 81, materials scientist
  - Hou Fusheng, 94, petroleum engineer

=== November ===
- 4 November – Wang Huanyu, 63, astrophysicist.
- 6 November – Deng Qidong, 80, geologist.
- 7 November – Xie Shileng, 83, port and coastal engineer.
- 10 November – Liu Xuyi, 105, historian.
- 12 November – Wang Junmin, 63, politician
- 15 November
  - Ba Zhongtan, 88, lieutenant general
  - Zhang Ting, 96, politician
- 17 November – Cheng Kaijia, 100, nuclear physicist and engineer.
- 19 November – Wu Jianchang, 79, engineer and politician
- 24 November – Shi Jiaonai, 97, plant physiologist
- 30 November – Chang Guitian, 76, xiangsheng actor

=== December ===
- 1 December – Zhang Ouying, 43, football player and coach
- 8 December – Wang Ruilin, 88, general and politician
- 9 December – Peng Sixun, 99, medicinal chemist
- 13 December
  - Gao Jindian, 79, army officer
  - Yuan Mu, 90, politician
- 15 December – Eryue He, 73, writer
- 19 December – Tömür Dawamat, 91, politician
