= Ai (surname) =

Ai (艾)
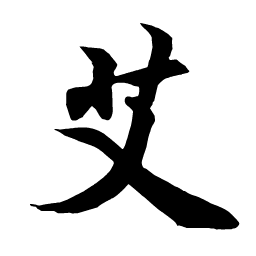
- Ai in Chinese character
- Pronunciation: Ài (Mandarin)
- Language: Chinese

Origin
- Language: Old Chinese
- Meaning: "mugwort"

Ai is the pinyin and Wade–Giles romanization of the Chinese surname 艾. It is listed 334th in the Song dynasty classic text Hundred Family Surnames. As of 2008, it is the 215th most common surname in Taiwan, shared by 400,000 people.

== Notable people ==
- Ai Nanying (艾南英; 1583–1646), Ming dynasty essayist
- Ai Nengqi (艾能奇; died 1647), rebel general and adopted son of Zhang Xianzhong
- Ai Yuanzheng (艾元征; 1624–1676), Qing dynasty Minister of Justice
- Ai Ai (艾靉; 1906–1982), Republic of China lieutenant general, Deputy Minister of Defense
- Ai Qing (艾青; 1910–1996), pen name of poet Jiang Zhenghan
- Ai Siqi (艾思奇; 1910–1966), pen name of Mongol-Chinese philosopher Li Shengxuan
- Ai Xia (艾霞; 1912–1934), silent film actress
- Ai Xing (艾兴; 1924–2008), mechanical engineer, academician of the Chinese Academy of Engineering
- Ai Zhisheng (艾知生; 1928–1997), Minister of Broadcast, Film, and Television
- Ai Weiren (艾维仁; 1932–2018), PLA lieutenant general
- Sarah Allan (艾兰; born 1945), American paleographer and sinologist
- Ai Xuan (艾軒; born 1947), artist, son of Ai Qing
- Ai Husheng (艾虎生; born 1951), PLA lieutenant general
- Ai Xiaoming (艾晓明; born 1953), writer and director
- Ai Wei (艾伟; born 1955), Taiwanese actor
- Ai Weiwei (艾未未; born 1957), artist, son of Ai Qing
- Ai Baojun (艾宝俊; born 1960), former vice mayor of Shanghai
- Randy Ai (艾雷迪; 1969–2013), Taiwanese cartoonist
- Ai Jing (艾敬; born 1969), singer and painter
- Ai Fei (艾芬; born 1974), Chinese physician
- Ai Jingjing (艾晶晶; born 1978), writer
- Ai Zhibo (艾志波; born 1982), football player
- Ai Mengmeng (艾梦萌; born 1983), singer
- Eve Ai (艾怡良; born 1987), Taiwanese singer
- Ai Fei (艾菲; born 1987), singer
- Gloria Ai (艾诚; born 1987), bilingual business anchorwoman
- Elkeson (艾克森; born 1989), footballer
