= Liu Zhonghua =

Chinese military officer

- 刘中华

First President and Political commissar of Naval Senior Institute
- In office 1957–1962

Political commissar and commander of the PLA Navy 6th Fleet
- In office 1951–1953

Personal details
- Born: January 3, 1917 Wendeng District, Weihai, Shandong, China
- Died: January 16, 2018 (aged 101) Qingdao, Shandong, China
- Party: Chinese Communist Party
- Children: 6
- Education: Voroshilov Naval Academy

Military service
- Allegiance: People's Republic of China
- Branch/service: People's Liberation Army Navy
- Years of service: 1935–1981
- Rank: Major general
- Battles/wars: Second Sino-Japanese War; Chinese Civil War
- Awards: Order of Independence and Freedom (2nd Class Medal) (1955); Order of Liberation (China) (1st Class Medal) (1955); Red Star Medal (2nd Class Medal)

Liu Zhonghua (simplified Chinese: 刘中华; traditional Chinese: 劉中華; pinyin: Liǘ Zhōnghuá; 3 January 1917 – 16 January 2018) was a Chinese military officer. He was commander and political commissar of the PLA Navy 6th Fleet in 1953, and president of Naval Senior Institute (now Naval Aeronautical Engineering Institute) in 1957. In 1955 he was awarded the rank of major general (shaojiang).

== Biography ==
=== Early life ===
Liu was born in Wendengying Town, Wendeng District, Weihai, Shandong, on 3 January 1917. He joined the Chinese Communist Party (CCP) in 1932.

=== Second Sino-Japanese War ===
In 1935, he became party chief of Wendeng County of the Communist Youth League of China, then he was appointed as an underground messenger in Qingdao. In May, an informer betray Liu and he was arrested by the local government. Liu was in prison for almost two and a half years until the Kuomintang and the Communist Party Cooperation. On December 24, 1937, Liu participated in the Tianfushan Uprising (天福山起义) and served as a political instructor in the Resistance Against Japanese Aggression Army of Shandong People (山东人民抗日救国军), five days later, he was arrested again. He was rescued from prison by the party organization. On July 7, 1937, the Marco Polo Bridge Incident triggered the Second Sino-Japanese War. In 1938, Liu was commissioned as political commissar of the 61st Regiment. During the Counter-Campaign against "Encirclement and Suppression", his legs were shot and wounded. In the spring of 1939, Liu went to Yan'an to attend the seminar, which was held by the Central Committee of the Chinese Communist Party. He had been ill at the 18th Army headquarters. After recovery, he entered the Northern Bureau Party School, where he studied alongside Xu Shiyou, Chen Xilian, and Liu Huaqing. In the summer of 1940, Liu returned to Shandong and served as political commissar in the 2nd Brigade of Shandong Columnists. In the summer of 1943, Liu became political commissar and CCP Committee Secretary of the Nanhai Military District (南海军分区). At the beginning of 1945, he was transferred to the Zhonghai Military District (中海军分区) and a year later he was transferred again to the Beihai Military District (北海军分区).

=== Chinese Civil War ===
In 1946, during the Chinese Civil War, Liu was political commissar of 27th Division of 9th Columnists of the East China Field Army, he was present at the Battle of Xintai-Laiwu, Battle of Menglianggu, Battle of Wei County, and Battle of Jinan. In February 1949, Liu was director of the political department of 30th Army of the 3rd Field Army, he participated in the Crossing River Campaigns and Liberation of Shanghai.

=== People's Republic of China ===
After the establishment of the People's Republic of China in 1949, Liu was deputy political commissar, then political commissar and commander of the PLA Navy 6th Fleet. In 1953, Liu was sent abroad to study at the expense of the government. In September 1955, he was awarded the military rank of major general (shaojiang) by Chairman Mao Zedong. In the spring of 1957, Liu returned to China and became the first president and political commissar of Naval Senior Institute (now Naval Aeronautical Engineering Institute). Liu retired in 1981, after the Cultural Revolution. In 1988, he was advanced to the Red Star Medal, 2nd Class Medal. He lived in the cadre sanatorium of Qingdao after his retirement. On January 16, 2018, he died of illness in Qingdao, Shandong, at the age of 101.

== Personal life ==
Liu had six children, four sons and two daughters.

== Awards ==
- Order of Independence and Freedom (2nd Class Medal) (1955)
- Order of Liberation (China) (1st Class Medal) (1955)
- Red Star Medal (2nd Class Medal)
