= Rhodosalinus sediminis =

Scientific classification
- Domain: Bacteria
- Kingdom: Pseudomonadati
- Phylum: Pseudomonadota
- Class: Alphaproteobacteria
- Order: Rhodobacterales
- Family: Rhodobacteraceae
- Genus: Rhodosalinus
- Species: R. sediminis

Binomial name
- Rhodosalinus sediminis Guo et al. 2017

Species of bacteria

Rhodosalinius sediminis is a Gram-negative species of bacteria from the genus of Rhodosalinus. Rhodosalinus sediminis has been isolated from a marine saltern in Wendeng, China.
