= Lü Xilin =

Chinese engineer

- Born: January 1955 (age 71); Qishan County, Shaanxi, China
- Education: Xi'an University of Architecture and Technology; Tongji University
- Scientific career
- Fields: Concrete structures Prestressed structures Aseismic structures
- Workplaces: Tongji University

Chinese name
- Traditional Chinese: 呂西林
- Simplified Chinese: 吕西林
Transcriptions
Standard Mandarin
- Hanyu Pinyin: Lǚ Xīlín

Lü Xilin (Chinese: 吕西林; born January 1955) is a Chinese engineer specializing in concrete structures, prestressed structures and aseismic structures.

== Biography ==
Lü was born in the town of Jingdang, Qishan County, Shaanxi, in January 1955. In September 1974, he entered the Xi'an Institute of Metallurgical Architecture (now Xi'an University of Architecture and Technology), where he graduated in August 1978. Then he earned his M.Eng. degree from Tongji University in 1984 under the supervision of Zhu Bolong (朱伯龙). He is the first doctor of engineering trained after the establishment of Tongji University.

In 1991 he became a visiting scholar at the University of Alberta and then University of Hong Kong. He returned to China in 1991 and joined the faculty of Tongji University. Four days after the 2008 Sichuan earthquake, he left for Sichuan with a team of six experts of Tongji University from Shanghai, as the "Expert Group of Housing Emergency Assessment" sent by the Ministry of Construction, to assess the disaster of houses in Guangyuan, Qingchuan County and Cangxi County.

== Honours and awards ==
- 2000 National Science Fund for Distinguished Young Scholars
- 2006 State Science and Technology Progress Award (Second Class)
- 2009 State Science and Technology Progress Award (Second Class)
- 2014 State Technological Invention Award (Second Class)
- November 2015 Engineering Construction Technology Award of the Ho Leung Ho Lee Foundation
- April 2017 Nathan M. Newmark Medal of the American Society of Civil Engineers (ASCE)
- November 22, 2019 Member of the Chinese Academy of Engineering (CAE)
