= Ai Xing =

Ai Xing may refer to:

- Ai Xing (engineer)
- Ai Xing (director)
