= Rhodosalinus =

Scientific classification
- Domain: Bacteria
- Kingdom: Pseudomonadati
- Phylum: Pseudomonadota
- Class: Alphaproteobacteria
- Order: Rhodobacterales
- Family: Rhodobacteraceae
- Genus: Rhodosalinus; Guo et al. 2017

Type species
- Rhodosalinus sediminis

Species
- R. sediminis

Genus of bacteria

Rhodosalinus is a Gram-negative, rod-shaped, moderately halophilic, facultatively anaerobic and motile genus of bacteria from the family of Rhodobacteraceae with one known species (Rhodosalinus sediminis). Rhodosalinus sediminis has been isolated from a marine saltern from Wendeng in China.
