= Yuan Chengye =

Chinese organic chemist

- Born: 10 October 1924; Shangyu, Zhejiang, China
- Died: 9 January 2018 (aged 93); Shanghai, China
- Education: National College of Pharmacy
- Scientific career
- Workplaces: Shanghai Institute of Organic Chemistry, CAS

Yuan Chengye (Chinese: 袁承業; pinyin: Yuán Chéngyè; Wade–Giles: Yüan Ch'eng-yeh; 1924–2018) was a Chinese organic chemist.

Yuan was born in Shangyu, Zhejiang province in 1924. He graduated from the National College of Pharmacy (now China Pharmaceutical University) in 1948 and received a Degree for Candidate for D.Sc from the All-Union Research Institute of Pharmaceutical Chemistry, in Moscow in 1955. He worked at the Shanghai Institute of Organic Chemistry, Chinese Academy of Sciences after returning to China. He led a research team for nuclear fuel extractants since 1958. In 1997, he was elected an academician of the Chinese Academy of Sciences. He died on 9 January 2018.
