= Zetou =

Zetou 泽头镇
- Town
- Location in Shandong
- Coordinates: 37°03′05″N 121°53′20″E
- Country: People's Republic of China
- Province: Shandong
- Prefecture-level city: Weihai
- County: Wendeng
- Time zone: UTC+8 (China Standard)

Zetou (Chinese: 泽头镇) is a town in Wendeng, Weihai, in eastern Shandong province, China.
