= Peng Sixun =

Chinese medicinal chemist

Peng Sixun (Chinese: 彭司勛; 28 July 1919 – 9 December 2018) was a Chinese medicinal chemist.

A native of Baojing County, Peng was of Tujia descent. He graduated from the National College of Pharmacy in 1942, and completed a master's degree at Columbia University in 1950. Peng returned to teach at his alma mater, which had been renamed China Pharmaceutical University, and was elected to the Chinese Academy of Engineering in February 1996. Peng died at the age of 99 on 9 December 2018.
