= Houjia =

Houjia 侯家镇
- Town
- Location in Shandong
- Coordinates: 37°01′12″N 122°05′18″E
- Country: People's Republic of China
- Province: Shandong
- Prefecture-level city: Weihai
- County: Wendeng
- Time zone: UTC+8 (China Standard)

Houjia (Chinese: 侯家镇) is a town in Wendeng, Weihai, in eastern Shandong province, China.
