= Dashuipo =

Dashuipo 大水泊镇
- Town
- Location in Shandong
- Coordinates: 37°11′07″N 122°15′02″E
- Country: People's Republic of China
- Province: Shandong
- Prefecture-level city: Weihai
- District: Wendeng
- Time zone: UTC+8 (China Standard)

Dashuipo (Chinese: 大水泊镇; pinyin: Dàshuǐpō Zhèn) is a town in Wendeng District, Weihai, in eastern Shandong province, China.

== See also ==
- Weihai Dashuipo Airport, named after Dashuipo town
