= Nicol Allan =

American artist (1931–2019)

- Born: 1931; Los Angeles, California, United States
- Died: 2019 (aged 87–88); Hanover, New Hampshire, United States
- Occupation: Artist
- Known for: paper collages
- Spouse: Sarah Meyers (m. 1963)

Nicol Allan (1931–2019) was an American artist known for his paper collages.

== Biography ==
Nicol Allan was born in Los Angeles in 1931 of Scottish immigrant parents. His father worked as a streetcar conductor until his death of tuberculosis, soon after his son's birth. Nicol Allan and his mother also contracted tuberculosis and he spent two years strapped flat on a Bradford frame after two spinal operations at the age of five. He then lived in a foster home for several years before returning to live with his family.

Allan was entirely self-trained as an artist and he did not attend university other than one term at Los Angeles City College. However, he had a work accepted in an open national competition organized by the Los Angeles County Museum at the age of 19 and he spent the rest of his life work as an artist. In 1963, he married Sarah (Meyers) Allan. They lived where her career as a sinologist took them: California, the United Kingdom, and then the United States again. He died in Hanover, New Hampshire in 2019. Although his work was exhibited in Los Angeles, New York, and London, and his work is in private and public collections, he lived reclusively and had little direct personal contact with the art world.

== Artwork ==
"The collages enter into dialogue with various strands of artistic modernism, from Braque and Picasso's papier collé to Malevich's Suprematism and Mondrian's De Stijl to American colour field painting. It is as if Allan had set himself the task of working through a number of formal problems in the history of abstraction and of making them new." - Rye Dag Holmboe

Allan's main medium was paper collage, and he produced about 200 pieces. He also worked in sumi, wood reliefs, watercolours, and occasionally oils. His work is generally on a very small scale, the collages usually measuring less than twenty centimeters in height and fifteen centimeters in width. They are highly compressed and abstract in form; the artist described them as "an interpretation in simple form of inner states of mind." They nevertheless allude to the natural world and to human life, with repeated themes, such as 'rain', 'waves', 'sea', 'mountains', 'masks', 'heads', and 'dancers'. As Andrew Hunt states, their compression "hints at its opposite: expanding celestial proportions…. His are pinpricks that disrupt and explode time and space." Rye Holmboe says: "There is comfort to be found in an implied structure, to be sure, as in the continuity between art and nature, but the collages also intimate a more groundless and vertiginous dimension of experience. It is this ambiguity, more than any thematic content, that both motivates and lies at the heart of Allan's paper poetics."

== Exhibitions ==
(Sources)

- 1950 – "Survey of American Painting" – at the Los Angeles County Museum
- 1952 – Artists of Los Angeles and Vicinity – at the Los Angeles County Museum
- 1954 – Artists of Los Angeles and Vicinity – at the Los Angeles County Museum
- 1959–60 – Solo exhibitions – at the Simone Gallery, Los Angeles
- 1960s – Cober Gallery, New York
- 1966 – Sylvan Simone Gallery, Los Angeles
- 1967 – Esther Bear Gallery, Santa Barbara
- 1978 – The Parsons-Dreyfuss Gallery (Betty Parsons), New York
- 1979 – Taranman Gallery, London
- 1980 – The Parsons-Dreyfuss Gallery (Betty Parsons), New York
- 1982 – Taranman Gallery, London
- 1982 – Arts Club of Chicago
- 1990s – Davis and Langdale, New York
- 2008 – "Nicol Allan: Collages", Davis & Langdale Company, 57th Street, New York, USA
- 2009 – "Recent Acquisitions", Davis & Langdale Company, 57th Street, New York, USA
- 2009 – "Nicol Allan: Recent Collages", Davis & Langdale Company, 57th Street, New York, USA
- 2010 – "Nicol Allan", Davis & Langdale Company, 57th Street, New York, USA
- 2012 – "5 Artists: On Paper", Davis & Langdale Company,57th Street, New York, USA
- 2012 – "Group Exhibition", Davis & Langdale Company, 57th Street, New York, USA
- 2015 – "Summer Exhibition", Davis & Langdale Company, 57th Street, New York, USA
- 2017 – "Recent Contemporary Works", Davis & Langdale Company, 57th Street, New York, USA
- 2017 – "Group Exhibition", Davis & Langdale Company, 57th Street, New York, USA
- 2021 – "Nicol Allan: Collages" – at Laure Genillard Gallery, Fitzrovia, London, UK

== Public holdings of Allan's work ==
Nicol Allan's work is held by

- the Arts Council of Great Britain
- the Art Institute of Chicago,
- the Christopher Hewitt Collection at the Ashmolean Museum, Oxford
- the De Beers Art Collection, London
- the Hood Museum, Dartmouth College, Hanover, New Hampshire
- the ARoS Aarhus Kunstmuseum, Denmark
