= Jieshi, Shandong =

Jieshi 界石镇
- Town
- Location in Shandong
- Coordinates: 37°16′36″N 121°52′25″E
- Country: People's Republic of China
- Province: Shandong
- Prefecture-level city: Weihai
- District: Wendeng

Area
  - Total: 186.4 km^{2} (72.0 sq mi)
- Elevation: 44 m (144 ft)

Population (2010)
  - Total: 32,300
  - Density: 173/km^{2} (449/sq mi)
- Time zone: UTC+8 (China Standard)

Jieshi (simplified Chinese: 界石镇; traditional Chinese: 界石鎮; pinyin: Jièshí Zhèn) is a town under the administration of Wendeng District, eastern Shandong province, China.

== History ==
In its present form, it was formed in 2001.

== Location ==
Jieshi is located 19 kilometres (12 mi) west-northwest of central Wendeng. Within Wendeng, it borders the town of Gejia to the south. It also borders Huancui District to the north and Yantai City's Muping District to the west. The town oversees 65 administrative villages (行政村) and 88 natural villages (自然村).

Jieshi sits in a basin surrounded on four sides by low-lying mountains, among them the Kunyu Mountains (昆嵛山), the primary peak of which is Mount Taibo (泰礴顶).
