= Weihai Dashuipo International Airport =

Weihai Dashuipo International Airport 威海大水泊国际机场
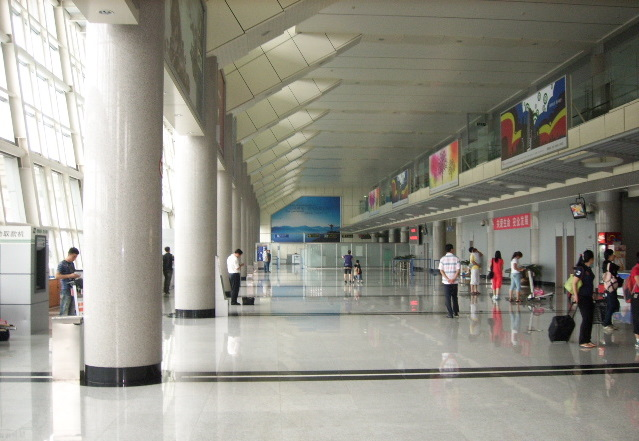
- IATA: WEH; ICAO: ZSWH

Summary
- Airport type: Public / Military
- Serves: Weihai
- Location: Dashuipo, Wendeng District, Weihai
- Elevation AMSL: 145 ft (44 m)
- Coordinates: 37°11′13″N 122°13′44″E
- Website: http://www.airwh.com

Map
- Location in Shandong WEH/ZSWH (China)

Runways
Direction	Length		Surface
Direction	m	ft	Surface
02/20	2,600	8,530	Concrete

Statistics (2025)
- Passengers: 2,908,096
- Aircraft movements: 23,705
- Cargo (metric tons): 28,772.5
- Source: List of the busiest airports in the People's Republic of China

Weihai Dashuipo International Airport
- Simplified Chinese: 威海大水泊国际机场
- Traditional Chinese: 威海大水泊國際機場
Transcriptions
Standard Mandarin
- Hanyu Pinyin: Wēihǎi Dàshuǐpō Guójì Jīchǎng

Weihai Dashuipo International Airport (IATA: WEH, ICAO: ZSWH), formerly known as Wendeng Air Force Airport, is a civilian-military airport in China, and the fourth largest airport in Shandong Province, with an annual passenger throughput exceeding one million. The airport was initially built in the 1980s and officially opened to traffic in 1996.

Located in Dashuipo Town, Wendeng District, Weihai City, Shandong Province, China, it is approximately 40 kilometers away from the center of Weihai City. The airport is about 9.5 kilometers from Wendeng East Railway Station on the Qingdao–Rongcheng intercity railway. The airport is a 4D-class military-civilian airport. After several expansions and openings to the outside world, international routes were launched in 2005. At the end of 2024, it was renamed "Weihai Dashuipo International Airport" and is an important air gateway for Weihai City.

Due to the relocation of Yantai Laishan Airport to Penglai City in the northwest, passengers from Muping District and Weihai City who traditionally use Yantai Airport may choose Weihai Airport instead. The straight-line distance between the two airports is 122 kilometers, giving Weihai Airport a vast passenger base. In 2024, the Ministry of Civil Affairs of the People's Republic of China issued an announcement that the original "Weihai Dashuipo Airport" was renamed "Weihai Dashuipo International Airport".

== History ==
Weihai Dashuipo International Airport traces its origins to the 1950s, when the People's Liberation Army Air Force established Wendeng Airfield as a military base. In May 1986, the Shandong provincial government formally requested approval from the State Council and the Central Military Commission to convert the airfield for civil aviation use. Civil operations were authorized in 1988, and Weihai Airport Company was founded the same year.

The airport's strategic role expanded in July 1992, when the State Council and the Central Military Commission approved its transformation into a dual‑use military–civil airport, accompanied by an expansion project built to 4D standards. Three years later, in August 1995, the airport expansion project, with an investment of 340 million yuan, was completed. On October 31, it passed the first comprehensive inspection by the Civil Aviation Administration of China and other relevant departments, meeting the requirements for civil airport operation, and the Civil Aviation Administration of China issued the "Weihai Airport Open to Civil Aviation Transport Enterprises License." The test flight to Beijing was successful. In January 1996, Weihai Airport officially began operations.

In October 2002, its airfield classification was formally updated to 4D, and in September 2004 the State Council approved the airport's opening to international traffic. March 2005 marked the launch of its first international route, linking Weihai with Seoul Incheon, followed in December 2013 by the opening of cross‑strait service to Taipei.

The airport was temporarily closed from May 1, 2014, for maintenance and upgrades to the airport runways, navigation facilities, and terminal buildings. Some of Weihai Airport's popular flights were relocated to Yantai Airport. More than four months later, the renovation project was completed and passed expert inspection. The airport reopened on September 28 of the same year and fully resumed operations.

In December 2024, with CAAC approval, the facility was officially renamed "Weihai Dashuipo International Airport," reflecting its established role as a regional gateway for both domestic and international travel.

== Airlines and destinations ==
Airlines	Destinations
Air China	Beijing–Capital, Beijing–Daxing, Hangzhou, Harbin
Chengdu Airlines	Changchun, Chengdu–Tianfu
China Eastern Airlines	Changchun, Changzhou, Chongqing, Guangzhou, Hefei, Nanchang, Nanjing, Seoul–Incheon, Shanghai–Hongqiao, Xi'an, Yangzhou
Jeju Air	Seoul–Incheon
Loong Air	Changchun, Hangzhou, Harbin, Ningbo, Shenyang, Xi'an
Qingdao Airlines	Harbin, Ningbo
Shandong Airlines	Jinan, Shenzhen
Shanghai Airlines	Changchun, Shanghai–Pudong
Spring Airlines	Nanjing, Shanghai–Pudong, Shenyang
Tianjin Airlines	Dalian, Shanghai–Pudong, Xiamen
Yakutia Airlines	Seasonal charter: Khabarovsk

=== Cargo ===
Airlines	Destinations
Central Airlines	Seoul–Incheon, Tokyo–Narita

== Airport facility ==
Weihai Airport is a class 4D airport. Its runway length is 2600 meters, apron area is 36,000 m^{2} (390,000 sq ft), terminal building area is 14,000 m^{2} (150,000 sq ft), and control tower is 1,700 m^{2} (18,000 sq ft). The airport is equipped with advanced communication and navigation, lighting, ILS, firefighting, and a variety of ground support vehicles. The airport has a complete system of air traffic control, maintenance, security, transportation, public security, and logistics services.

The airport's facility can handle aircraft up to the sizes of Boeing 767 and Airbus A300. The airport's passenger handling capacity (for domestic flights) is 1.4 million passengers per year, and cargo capacity is 50,000 tons per year.

At the end of 2003, focusing on the development of ports and the protection of international flights, the government decided to conduct a comprehensive renovation and expansion. This project was completed in July 2005. Included in the renovation were 6,000 m^{2} (65,000 sq ft) of the International Hall and 13,000 m^{2} (140,000 sq ft) of the domestic hall, with a new construction area of 3,000 m^{2} (32,000 sq ft). An overall transformation of the terminal's appearance was accomplished.

Airport Road has become a bridge connecting the city with the airport's Landscape Avenue.

== Military Airport ==
Because the airport hosts military planes, the landing and takeoff from Weihai Airport is done sometimes with all window shades down.

== See also ==
- List of airports in China
