= Zhangjiachan =

Zhangjiachan 张家产镇
- Town
- Location in Shandong
- Coordinates: 37°05′57″N 122°06′00″E
- Country: People's Republic of China
- Province: Shandong
- Prefecture-level city: Weihai
- County: Wendeng
- Time zone: UTC+8 (China Standard)

Zhangjiachan (Chinese: 张家产镇) is a town in Wendeng, Weihai, in eastern Shandong province, China.
