= Ai Qing =

Chinese poet (1910–1996)

- 蔣正涵
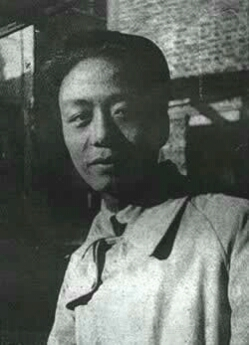
- Ai Qing in Paris, France, 1929
- Born: Jiang Zhenghan; March 27, 1910; Fantianjiang village, Jinhua county, Zhejiang province, China
- Died: May 5, 1996 (aged 86); Beijing, China
- Education: China Academy of Art
- Occupation: poet
- Spouse: Gao Ying
- Children: Ai Xuan, Ai Weiwei
- Writing career
- Pen name: Ejia (莪加); Ke'a (克阿); Linbi (林壁)
- Language: Chinese
- Period: 1936–1986

Ai Qing (Chinese: 艾青; pinyin: Ài Qīng; Wade–Giles: Ai Ch'ing, March 27, 1910 – May 5, 1996), born Jiang Zhenghan (Chinese: 蒋正涵; pinyin: Jiǎng Zhènghán) and styled Jiang Haicheng (Chinese: 蒋海澄; pinyin: Jiǎng Hǎichéng), was a 20th-century Chinese poet. He was known under his pen names Linbi (Chinese: 林壁; pinyin: Línbì), Ke'a (Chinese: 克阿; pinyin: Kè'ā) and Ejia (Chinese: 莪伽; pinyin: Éjiā).

== Life ==
Ai Qing was born in Fantianjiang village (贩田蒋), Jinhua county, in eastern China's Zhejiang province. After entering Hangzhou Xihu Art School in 1928, on the advice of principal Lin Fengmian, he went abroad and studied in Paris the following spring. From 1929 to 1932 while studying in France, besides learning art of Renoir and Van Gogh, the philosophy of Kant and Hegel, he also studied modern poets such as Mayakovsky and was especially influenced by Belgian poet Verhaeren.

After returning to Shanghai, China in May 1932, he joined China Left Wing Artist Association, and was arrested in July for opposing the Kuomintang. During his imprisonment, Ai Qing translated Verhaeren's poems and wrote his first book Dayanhe—My Nanny (大堰河—我的保姆), "Reed Flute" (芦笛), and "Paris" (巴黎). He was imprisoned for three years.

After the start of the Second Sino-Japanese War in 1937, Ai Qing wrote "Snow falls on China's Land" (雪落在中国的土地上) after arriving at Wuhan to support the war effort. In 1938, he moved to Guilin to become the editor of Guixi Daily newspaper. In 1940, he became the dean of the Chinese department at Chongqing YuCai University.

In 1941, he moved to Yan'an, and joined the Chinese Communist Party in the subsequent year. Beginning in 1949, he was on cultural committees. He was editor of Poetry Magazine, and associate editor of People's Literature.

Differing from colleagues who viewed art as serving political needs, Ai Qing believed in the individuality of the literati and that the act of literary creation was sacred. At the time, Ai Qing was also privately expressing his discontent over what he viewed as the monotony and conservatism of poetry in China. In 1956, Zhou Yang criticised him for these views, questioning whether Ai Qing was capable of "singing for socialism." Ai Qing responded by making a self-criticism.

The Hundred Flowers Movement increased Ai Qing's optimism in the state of Chinese poetry. He wrote Dream of the Flower Grower, in which a gardener who has raised a uniform plot of Chinese roses is visited in a dream by a varied collection of other flowers, who chide the gardener for closing his gates to them. Upon waking, the gardener concludes:

So the flowers themselves have a will, blooming is their right, and in my prejudice toward some of them I have fostered discontent among all. I too feel more and more that the world has become too narrow. Without comparison, many ideas will become vague. If we have a short one, only then can we see the tall ones; only among the small can we see the big; and only among the bad can we see the good (...)

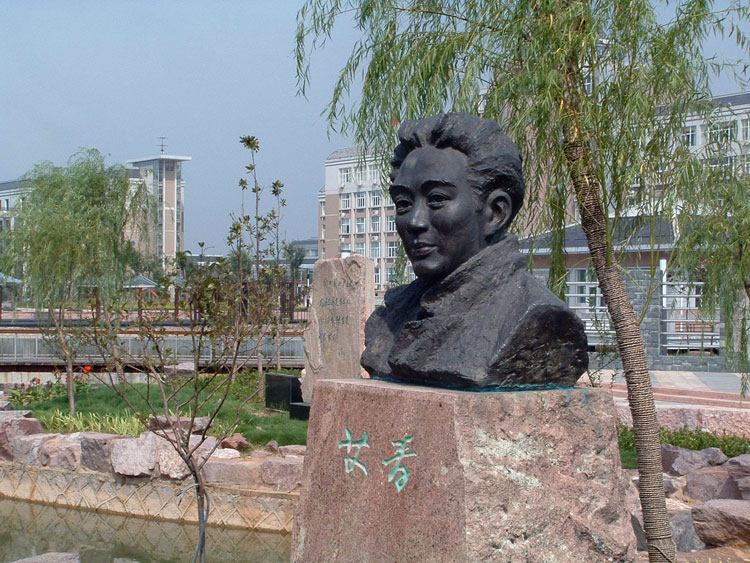
Ai Qing bust at Jinhua No.1 High School, China

In 1957, during the Anti-Rightist Movement, Ai Qing defended Ding Ling and was accused of "rightism". He was exiled to farms in northeast China in 1958 and was transferred to Xinjiang in 1959 by the Communist authorities. During the period of the Cultural Revolution he was forced to work daily cleaning the communal toilets for his village of about 200 people, a physically demanding job he was required to carry out for five years, then aged in his 60s. According to an account by his son Ai Weiwei, he lost vision in one of his eyes due to lack of nutrition. He was not allowed to publish his works Return Song (归来的歌) and Ode to Light (光的赞歌) until he was reinstated in 1979. In 1979, he was vice-chairman of the Chinese Writers Association.

He made a second journey to France in 1980, and in 1985 French president François Mitterrand awarded him the title of Commander of the Order of Arts and Letters.

== Family ==
He is the father of the prominent Chinese artist and activist Ai Weiwei, who participated in designing the Beijing National Stadium, and the painter Ai Xuan. He had two daughters with his second wife.

== Pen name ==
In 1933, while being tortured and imprisoned by the Kuomintang and writing his book Dayan River — My Nanny, he went to write his surname (Jiang, 蒋), but stopped at the first component "艹" due to his bitterness towards KMT leader Chiang Kai-shek. He resented sharing the same surname (Jiang/Chiang) and simply crossed out the rest of the character with an "X". This happens to be the Chinese character ài (艾), and since the rest of his name, Hǎi Chéng meant the limpidity of the sea, it implied the color of limpid water qīng (青, turquoise, blue, or green), so he adopted the pen name Ai Qing.

== Works ==
- Kuangye (1940; “Wildness”)
- Xiang taiyang (1940 “Toward the Sun”)
- Beifang (1942; “North”)
- Guilai de ge (1980; “Song of Returning”)
- Ai Qing quanji (“The Complete Works of Ai Qing”) in 1991.

=== Works in French ===
- Le chant de la lumière «Guang de zange » 光 的 赞 歌, éditor, translator Ng Yok-Soon. Ed. les Cent fleurs, 1989
- De la poésie; Du poète / Ai Qing « Shilun » 诗 论, translator Chantal Chen-Andro, Wang Zaiyuan, Ballouhey, Centre de recherche de l’Université de Paris VIII, 1982
- ''Poèmes / Ai Ts’ing, éditor, translator Catherine Vignal. Publications orientalistes de France, 1979.
- Le récif : poèmes et fables / Ai Qing, éditor, translator Ng Yok-Soon. Ed. les Cent fleurs, 1987

=== Works in German ===
- Manfred und Shuxin Reinhardt (ed. and transl.): Auf der Waage der Zeit. Gedichte. Volk und Welt, Berlin 1988 (in Nachdichtungen von Annemarie Bostroem)
- Susanne Hornfeck (ed. and transl.): Schnee fällt auf Chinas Erde. Gedichte. Penguin Verlag, München 2021

=== Works in English ===
- Eugene Chen Eoyang (ed. and transl.), Selected Poems of Ai Qing, Indiana University Press, 1982
- Robert Dorsett (transl.), Selected Poems, Crown, 2021

=== Anthologies ===
- Edward Morin, Fang Dai, ed. (1990). The Red azalea: Chinese poetry since the Cultural Revolution. Translated by Edward Morin; Fang Dai; Dennis Ding. University of Hawaii Press. ISBN 978-0-8248-1320-8.
- Joseph S. M. Lau; Howard Goldblatt, eds. (2007). The Columbia anthology of modern Chinese literature. Columbia University Press. p. 516. ISBN 978-0-231-13841-3.
- Huang, Yunte. (2016). The Big Red Book of Modern Chinese Literature. W. W. Norton & Company. p. 290. ISBN 978-0393239485.

== See also ==
- 1000 Years of Joys and Sorrows - A memoir by Ai Weiwei which discusses Ai Qing

== Portrait ==
- Ai Qing. A Portrait by Kong Kai Ming at Portrait Gallery of Chinese Writers (Hong Kong Baptist University Library).

== Sources ==
- Columbia Encyclopedia
- Obituary (in French)
- asiaweek.com Obituary
- Ai Qing Museum (in Chinese)
