= Xu Delong =

Xu Delong (Chinese: 徐德龙; August 1952 – 21 September 2018) was a Chinese materials scientist and a leading authority in silicate research and engineering. He was an academician of the Chinese Academy of Engineering (CAE), and served as Vice President of the CAE and President of Xi'an University of Architecture and Technology.

== Biography ==
Xu was born in Lanzhou, Gansu, China in August 1952. He graduated from Xi'an Institute of Metallurgy and Architecture (now Xi'an University of Architecture and Technology) in 1976. He earned his master's degree in inorganic, non-metallic materials science from Nanjing Institute of Chemical Technology (now Nanjing Tech University) in 1983, and his Ph.D. in iron and steel metallurgy from Northeastern University (China) in 1996.

Xu pioneered a number of technical innovations which have been widely used in cement production and iron and steel metallurgy. In 2003, he was elected as an academician of the Chinese Academy of Engineering. He also served as vice president of the CAE and president of his alma mater, Xi'an University of Architecture and Technology. He was elected a member of the 12th National People's Congress. He won many national, provincial, and ministerial prizes for his innovations.

Xu died on 21 September 2018 in Beijing, aged 66.
