= Lin Xiangdi =

Chinese optoelectronic engineer

Lin Xiangdi (Chinese: 林祥棣; 8 February 1934 – 29 July 2018) was a Chinese optoelectronic engineer. He was an academician of the Chinese Academy of Engineering and served as president of the Southwest University of Science and Technology in Sichuan.

== Biography ==
Lin was born 8 February 1934 in Nantong, Jiangsu, China. After graduating from Zhejiang University in 1956, he worked for the Changchun Institute of Optics, Fine Mechanics and Physics of the Chinese Academy of Sciences (CAS).

In 1972, Lin moved to Sichuan Province to help establish the Institute of Optics and Electronics of the CAS, and became vice president of the institute. He was elected an academician of the Chinese Academy of Engineering in 1997, and served as president of the Chengdu branch of the CAS. He served as president of the Southwest University of Science and Technology in Mianyang from December 2000 to October 2004, and continued to be president emeritus until his death.

Lin died on 29 July 2018 in Chengdu, aged 84.
