= Wendengying =

Wendengying 文登营镇
- Town
- Location in Shandong
- Coordinates: 37°13′07″N 122°06′47″E
- Country: People's Republic of China
- Province: Shandong
- Prefecture-level city: Weihai
- County: Wendeng
- Time zone: UTC+8 (China Standard)

Wendengying (Chinese: 文登营镇) is a town in Wendeng, Weihai, in eastern Shandong province, China.
