= He Yousheng =

Chinese hydrodynamicist and mechanical engineer

He Yousheng (Chinese: 何友声; 28 July 1931 – 17 January 2018) was a Chinese hydrodynamicist and mechanical engineer. He was a professor of Shanghai Jiao Tong University and served as its party secretary from 1986 to 1992. A pioneer of shipbuilding theory in China, he was elected an academician of the Chinese Academy of Engineering.

== Biography ==
He Yousheng was born on 28 July 1931 in Ningbo, Zhejiang, Republic of China. In 1952, he graduated from Tongji University in Shanghai with a bachelor's degree in shipbuilding, and pursued graduate studies in mechanics at Tsinghua University in Beijing, starting in 1957.

He taught as an assistant professor at the Dalian University of Technology before moving to Shanghai Jiao Tong University (SJTU), where he spent most of his career. He was later promoted to lecturer, associate professor, and eventually professor. He served as Communist Party Secretary of SJTU from 1986 to 1992.

He published over 100 scientific papers. His research was focused on naval hydrodynamics, specifically propeller vibration resistance, and estuary hydrodynamics. His research has been widely used in the Chinese shipbuilding industry and in the design of shipping channels of the Yangtze River estuary. He also studied the high-speed hydrodynamics of torpedoes and missiles.

He won the State Science and Technology Progress Award (Second Class) and more than ten national and provincial awards. He was elected an academician of the Chinese Academy of Engineering in 1995, and of Academia Europaea in 2002.

On 17 January 2018, He died at Zhongshan Hospital in Shanghai, at the age of 86.
