= Ma Jin (geologist) =

Chinese geologist and geophysicist

Ma Jin (Chinese: 马瑾; 27 November 1934 – 12 August 2018) was a Chinese geophysicist and structural geologist. She was a senior research fellow at the Institute of Geology of the China Earthquake Administration, and an academician of the Chinese Academy of Sciences.

== Biography ==
Ma was born on 27 November 1934 in Rugao, Jiangsu, Republic of China. She studied at the Beijing Institute of Geology from 1952 to 1956. After graduation, she entered the Institute of Geology of the Chinese Academy of Sciences (CAS) to study structural geology under Zhang Wenyou (张文佑). In 1958, she went to the Soviet Union to study at the Institute of Tectonophysics, USSR Academy of Sciences, and earned an associate doctor degree (Ph.D. equivalent) in 1962.

After returning to China in 1962, she worked as an assistant researcher at the Institute of Geology of CAS. In 1978, she was transferred to the Institute of Geology of the China Earthquake Administration and promoted to associate research fellow. She became senior research fellow in 1981, and later served as Director of the institute's academic committee. She was a visiting scholar at the United States Geological Survey in 1983.

Ma made significant contributions in tectonophysics, specifically the mechanisms of tectonic deformation and its relations to seismic activity. She published over 200 scientific papers and several monographs, and won more than 10 national and ministerial awards. She was elected an academician of the Chinese Academy of Sciences in 1997.

Ma died in Beijing on 12 August 2018, at the age of 83.
