= Ai Jing =

Mainland Chinese singer and painter (born 1969)

Ai Jing 艾敬
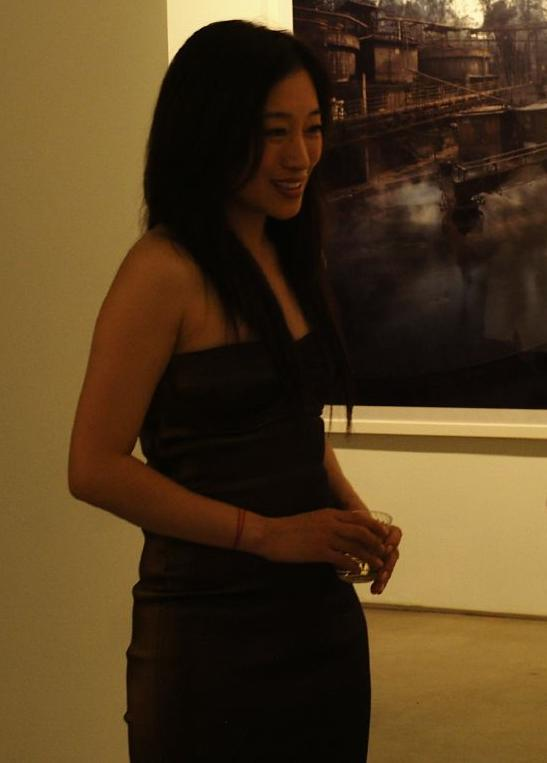
- Ai Jing in 2007

Background information
- Born: September 10, 1969 (age 56)
- Origin: People's Republic of China
- Genres: Rock, pop
- Instruments: Vocals, guitar
- Years active: 1992–2007
- Website: https://www.artaijing.com/en/about/

Ai Jing (Chinese: 艾敬; pinyin: Ài Jìng; born 10 September 1969) is a Chinese singer, actress and painter. China's Northeast News called her "China's most talented female folk rock singer."

Ai was born into a musical family in Shenyang, Liaoning: her father played several instruments, and her mother was a Pingju singer. She attended the Shenyang Special School of Art, joined the Oriental Song and Dance Troupe (Chinese: 东方歌舞团; pinyin: dōngfāng gēwǔ tuán) in Beijing at age 18, and first gained widespread attention with her 1992 song "My 1997" (Chinese: 我的1997; pinyin: wǒde yījiǔjiǔqī). A semi-autobiographical ballad that has been compared to Cui Jian's "Nothing to My Name" in terms of its social impact, the song tells about her love for a man living in Hong Kong, and how she eagerly awaits the 1997 handover of Hong Kong to China so she can visit him. After "My 1997", she performed throughout East and Southeast Asia for several years. The music video for her 1993 "Wandering Swallow" (Chinese: 流浪的燕子; pinyin: liúlàng de yànzi) won the Chunlan Cup MTV Convention.

Nimrod Baranovitch describes Ai as one of China's first "independent, free, active, dynamic, perhaps even rebellious" female pop stars". She is also known for having written and produced much of her own music, in a time when few Chinese artists were doing so. Much of her music defied stylistic rules and incorporated Western folk and rock styles. But after her early albums, Baranovitch claims, Ai's popularity decreased as her themes became more "personal and nonconformist", and she faced "antagonism" from men within the music industry because she did not sexually objectify herself and because her introduction of new musical styles challenged the male-dominated industry.

Ai moved to New York in 1997, and since then has mostly lived in the United States, although she recorded her 2003 album Is it a Dream? (是不是梦) in the United Kingdom. In the late 1990s Ai switched her focus to painting, and had her first professional exhibition in 2008. She has also acted in three films: Five Girls and a Rope (五个女子和一根绳子; 1991), Beijing Bastards (北京杂种; 1993), and From the Queen to the Chief Executive (等候董建华发落; 2001).

== Discography ==
Year	Original title	English translation	Notes
1992	我的一九九七	My 1997	
1995	艳粉街的故事	Story of Yanfen Street	
1996	追月	Chasing the Moon	
1999	Made in China	(n/a)	
2003	是不是梦	Is it a Dream?	
2006	艾在旅途	Ai on the Road	compilation album
2007	我的1997和2007	My 1997 and 2007	compilation album
