= Shi Jiaonai =

Chinese plant physiologist (1920–2018)

- 施教耐
- Born: 29 November 1920; Jinjiang, Fujian, China
- Died: 24 November 2018 (aged 97); Shanghai, China
- Education: Zhejiang University
- Scientific career
- Fields: Plant physiology
- Workplaces: Shanghai Institutes for Biological Sciences

Shi Jiaonai (Chinese: 施教耐; pinyin: Shī Jiàonài; Wade–Giles: Shih Chiao-nai; 29 November 1920 – 24 November 2018) was a Chinese plant physiologist. He was a member of the China Democratic League (Minmeng).

== Biography ==
Shi was born in Jinjiang, Fujian, on November 29, 1920 and moved to the Philippines when he was ten. He returned to China in 1940. In 1944 he graduated from Zhejiang University, where he majored in botany.

In 1991 he was elected a member of the Chinese Academy of Sciences. He was a researcher at the Shanghai Institutes for Biological Sciences before his death in November 2018.

== Awards ==
- 1987 Second Prize for Scientific and Technological Progress, Chinese Academy of Sciences
- 2000 Ho Leung Ho Lee Foundation
- 1989 Excellent Returned Overseas Chinese Intellectuals in China
