= Chinese rose =

Chinese rose is a common name for several plants and may refer to:

- Hibiscus rosa-sinensis
- Rosa chinensis, native to southwestern China
