= Xie Shileng =

Chinese port and coastal engineer

- 谢世楞
- Born: May 20, 1935; Cixi, Zhejiang, China
- Died: November 7, 2018 (aged 83); Tianjin, China
- Education: Dalian University of Technology
- Scientific career
- Fields: Coastline hydrodynamics Coastal engineering design
- Workplaces: First Navigational Engineering Survey and Design Institute

Chinese name
- Traditional Chinese: 謝世楞
- Simplified Chinese: 谢世楞
Transcriptions
Standard Mandarin
- Hanyu Pinyin: Xiè Shìléng

Xie Shileng (Chinese: 谢世楞; 20 May 1935 – 7 November 2018) was a Chinese port and coastal engineer who served as an assistant chief engineer of the First Navigational Engineering Survey and Design Institute of the Ministry of Transport.

== Biography ==
Xie was born in Cixi, Zhejiang on May 20, 1935. After graduating from the Dalian University of Technology in August 1956, he was assigned to the Water Transport Planning and Design Institute of the Ministry of Transport. One year later he was transferred to its First Navigational Engineering Survey and Design Institute. After the Cultural Revolution in November 1979, Xie pursued advanced studies in the Netherlands, where he studied at Delft University of Technology. In 1999 he was elected an academician of the Chinese Academy of Engineering. He died of lymphoma in Tianjin, on November 7, 2018.

== Awards ==
- 1985 Second Prize of the State Science and Technology Progress Award
- 2007 First Prize of the State Science and Technology Progress Award
- 2013 First Prize of the State Science and Technology Progress Award
