= Sun Shu =

Sun Shu (Chinese: 孙枢; 23 July 1933 – 11 February 2018) was a Chinese geologist. He was an academician of the Chinese Academy of Sciences (CAS) and The World Academy of Sciences (TWAS), and served as Director of the Institute of Geology of the CAS.

== Biography ==
Sun was born on 23 July 1933 in Jintan, Jiangsu Province. After graduating from the geology department of Nanjing University, he began working for the Institute of Geology of the CAS. He was appointed director of the institute in 1984. In 1991 he became deputy director of the National Natural Sciences Fund.

He was a professor at the Graduate School of the Chinese Academy of Sciences, and a visiting professor at many Chinese universities including Nanjing University, East China Normal University, Zhejiang University, Northwest University, and others. He also served as deputy chairman and honorary chairman of the board of his alma mater, Nanjing University.

Sun was elected a fellow of The World Academy of Sciences in 1989 and an academician of the Chinese Academy of Sciences in 1991.

Sun died on 11 February 2018, at the age of 84.
