= Li Chaoyi =

Chinese neurobiologist and politician

- 李朝义
- Born: 1934; Chongqing, China
- Died: 2018 (aged 83–84); Shanghai, China
- Education: China Medical University; Fudan University
- Scientific career
- Fields: Neuroscience
- Workplaces: Chinese Academy of Sciences

Li Chaoyi (simplified Chinese: 李朝义; traditional Chinese: 李朝義; pinyin: Lǐ Cháoyì; 1934 – 11 August 2018) was a Chinese neurobiologist. He was an academician of the Chinese Academy of Sciences and was a member of the Chinese Communist Party.

== Biography ==
Li was born in Chongqing in 1934. He graduated from China Medical University and Fudan University.

Li was a visiting scientist at Max Planck Institute for Biophysical Chemistry, Princeton University, KU Leuven, McGill University, Kyushu Institute of Technology, and Centre national de la recherche scientifique. He was a part-time professor at Fudan University, University of Science and Technology of China, Huazhong University of Science and Technology, Jinan University and the Third Military Medical University.

In 1999 he was elected a member of the council of International Brain Research Organization (IBRO).

On August 11, 2018, Li died of illness in Shanghai.

== Papers ==
- Tao Xu; Lin Wang; Xuemei Song; Chaoyi Li (2013). "The Detection of Orientation Continuity and Discontinuity by Cat V1 Neurons". PLOS ONE. 1 (11) e79723. Bibcode:2013PLoSO...879723X. doi:10.1371/journal.pone.0079723. PMC 3836789. PMID 24278163.
- Ke Chen; Xuemei Song; Chaoyi Li (2012). "Contrast-Dependent Variations in the Excitatory Classical Receptive Field and Suppressive Nonclassical Receptive Field of Cat Primary Visual Cortex". Cereb Cortex.
- Zeng C; Li Y; Chaoyi Li (2011). "Center-surround interaction with adaptive inhibition: a computational model for contour detection". NeuroImage. 55 (1): 49–66. doi:10.1016/j.neuroimage.2010.11.067. PMID 21126589. S2CID 9235272.
- Yao J. G.; Gao X; Yan H. M.; Chaoyi Li (2011). "Field of attention for instantaneous object recognition". PLOS ONE. 6 (1) e16343. Bibcode:2011PLoSO...616343Y. doi:10.1371/journal.pone.0016343. PMC 3025004. PMID 21283690.

== Awards ==
- 1991 Second Prize in Natural Science, Chinese Academy of Sciences
- 1997 Second Prize in State Natural Science Award
- 2000 Science and Technology Award of the Ho Leung Ho Lee Foundation
