= Fang Nanjiang =

Fang Nanjiang (Chinese: 方南江; April 1943 – 3 October 2018) was a major general of the Chinese People's Armed Police (PAP) and a writer of military-themed novels. He served as Deputy Director of the Political Department of the PAP and Director of the Organization Department of the Jinan Military Region. He co-authored The Last Salute, which won a national award for short novels in 1980 and was adapted into a film and a TV series.

== Biography ==
Fang was born in April 1943 in Jianli County, Hubei, China, with his ancestral home in Pingjiang County, Hunan. He enlisted in the People's Liberation Army in 1963 and joined the Chinese Communist Party in March 1965. He served in the 356th Regiment of the 76th Division of the 26th Group Army. He was later transferred to the headquarters of the Jinan Military Region and served as its Director of Organization Department.

After leaving the Jinan Military Region, Fang served as Political Commissar of the Shandong Provincial People's Armed Police, and later as Deputy Director of the Political Department of the PAP. He attained the rank of Major General in July 1996.

Fang began publishing novels in the early 1980s and became a member of the China Writers Association in 2005. He co-authored with Li Quan (李荃) the novel The Last Salute (最后一个军礼). It won the National Short Novel Prize in 1980 and was adapted into a film and a TV series. He also published the long novel The Guards of China (中国近卫军).

Fang died on 3 October 2018 in Beijing, at the age of 75.
