= Lin Zunqi =

Chinese physicist

Lin Zunqi (Chinese: 林尊琪; 3 June 1942 – 28 May 2018) was a Chinese physicist who was an expert in high-power solid-state lasers. He was a professor of the Shanghai Institute of Optics and Fine Mechanics, chief engineer of the National Laboratory on High Power Laser and Physics of the Chinese Academy of Sciences (CAS), and an academician of the CAS.

Lin was born in Beijing on 3 June 1942. After graduating from University of Science and Technology of China in 1964, he finished his postgraduate studies in 1968. He was instrumental in the construction of the Shenguang-II High Power Laser Facility, China's largest laser fusion facility. He published more than 200 papers and won multiple national science prizes for his contributions to laser research. He was awarded the Ho Leung Ho Lee Prize for technological sciences.

On 28 May 2018, Lin died at Huadong Hospital in Shanghai, at the age of 75.
