= Liu Xuyi =

Chinese historian (1913–2018)

- 刘绪贻
- Born: 13 May 1913; Huangpi District, Wuhan, Hubei, China
- Died: 10 November 2018 (aged 105); Wuhan, Hubei, China
- Education: Tsinghua University; University of Chicago
- Occupations: Historian, scholar, writer
- Years active: 1947–2018
- Notable work: General History of the United States
- Political party: Chinese Communist Party
- Spouse: Zhou Shiying

Chinese name
- Traditional Chinese: 劉緒貽
- Simplified Chinese: 刘绪贻
Transcriptions
Standard Mandarin
- Hanyu Pinyin: Liǘ Xùyí

Liu Xuyi (Chinese: 刘绪贻; 13 May 1913 – 10 November 2018) was a Chinese historian, scholar, writer and expert on US studies.

== Biography ==
Liu was born into a poor intellectual family in Huangpi District of Wuhan, Hubei, on 13 May 1913, a year after the fall of the Qing dynasty.

In 1929 he attended the Hanyang No. 12 Middle School and then Hubei Provincial High School.

In 1936 he was accepted to Tsinghua University, where he studied social anthropology.

In 1945 he arrived in the United States at the age of 32 to begin his education at the University of Chicago in Chicago, Illinois. He returned to China after graduation and worked as an associate professor in Wuhan University.

In 1949 he joined the New Democratic Education Association, a Chinese Communist Party underground organization.

After the founding of the People's Republic of China, he was elected chairman of Wuhan University's Committee for Assisting the Takeover in June 1949 and later became a member of the university's administrative committee and acting secretary-general in August 1949. He joined the Chinese Communist Party in 1953. In 1964, Liu returned to Wuhan University and helped establish one of China's earliest university research institutes dedicated to American history.Liu retired in 1989.

On 10 November 2018, he died of cerebrovascular disease in Wuhan, Hubei.

== Personal life ==
Liu met Zhou Shiying (Chinese: 周世英) in 1935, when he attended a meeting held by the Hubei Federation of High School Graduates. They married in Chongqing.

== Work ==
- 美国通史 [General History of the United States] (in Chinese). People's Publishing House. 2002. ISBN 9787010036441.
- 刘绪贻自传 [Autobiography of Liu Xuyi] (in Chinese). Guangxi Normal University Press. 2010. ISBN 9787563397877.
- 中国的儒学统治 [Confucian Rule in China] (in Chinese). Renmin University of China Press. 2014. ISBN 9787300191300.
