= Liu Jianfu =

Chinese police official and politician

Liu Jianfu (Chinese: 刘坚夫; c. 1918 – 8 June 2018) was a Chinese police official and politician who served as police chief and deputy mayor of Beijing.

== Biography ==
Liu was born in Lingqiu County, Shanxi Province. He enlisted in the Eighth Route Army in 1937 and joined the Chinese Communist Party (CCP) in 1938. He served in Yan'an, the CCP headquarters during the Second Sino-Japanese War. In August 1945, he became the head of security in charge of the safety of top leaders including Mao Zedong, Zhou Enlai, and Ren Bishi.

After the establishment of the People's Republic of China in 1949, Liu worked in the police departments in Beijing, Hubei, Guangzhou, and Anshan. After the Cultural Revolution, he was appointed the police chief of Beijing in July 1977 and later deputy mayor of Beijing.

Liu retired in 1997. He died on 8 June 2018 in Beijing Hospital, at the age of 100.
