= Wu Jianchang =

Chinese materials engineer, metallurgist, and politician (1939–2018)

- 吴建常

Vice Minister of Metallurgical Industry
- In office December 1997 – March 1998
- Leader: Liu Qi (minister)

Personal details
- Born: 2 June 1939 Changsha, Hunan, China
- Died: 19 November 2018 (aged 79) Xiehe Hospital, Beijing, China
- Party: Chinese Communist Party
- Spouse: Deng Lin (m. 1973; died 2018)
- Children: 1
- Relatives: Deng family (by marriage)
- Education: University of South China
- Occupation: Politician, metallurgist, materials engineer

Chinese name
- Traditional Chinese: 吳建常
- Simplified Chinese: 吴建常
Transcriptions
Standard Mandarin
- Hanyu Pinyin: Wú Jiàncháng

Wu Jianchang (Chinese: 吴建常; 2 June 1939 – 19 November 2018) was a Chinese materials engineer, metallurgist, and politician who served as vice-minister of Metallurgical Industry in the 1990s.

== Biography ==
Born in June 1939, Wu graduated from the University of South China. He was an engineer in the General Research Institute for Nonferrous Metals from September 1964 to April 1984. Wu joined the newly established China Non-ferrous Metals Industry Corporation in 1984, becoming vice-general manager in April 1984 and general manager in August 1994. He was vice-minister of Metallurgical Industry between December 1997 and March 1998. He was vice-president of China Iron and Steel Industry Association (CISA) in 1999, and held that office until April 2011. He became honorary president of China Non-ferrous Metals Industry Association in April 2011, and served until his death.

== Personal life ==
In 1973 Wu married Deng Lin (Chinese: 邓林), the eldest daughter of Deng Xiaoping. Their son, Wu Mengmeng (Chinese: 吴萌萌), was born in 1974.
