= Su Hongxi =

Chinese surgeon best known for performing the first open heart surgery

Su Hongxi (simplified Chinese: 苏鸿熙; traditional Chinese: 蘇鴻熙; pinyin: Sū Hóngxī; Wade–Giles: Su Hung-hsi; January 1915 – July 31, 2018) was a Chinese surgeon best known for performing the first open heart surgery with cardiopulmonary bypass in mainland China.

== Early life ==
Su was born in Tongshan County (modern Xuzhou), Jiangsu. He graduated from medical school at National Central University in 1943 and received an internship offer from the United States in 1949. The Chinese Communist Party (CCP) approved his internship abroad. As a result, Su left China and moved to the United States to study surgery. He obtained his specialization in the early 1950s in the field of cardiovascular surgery.

== Career ==
After American surgeon John Gibbon’s success in 1953, Su decided to introduce open heart surgery to China, purchasing two cardiopulmonary bypass (CPB) pumps. He lived under surveillance, and his return was supposedly impeded. Still, he managed to transport the pumps to China with his American wife Jane McDonald's help. Jane flew to Europe via Canada, where she received the pumps. Later, Su sailed to Britain, where he joined Jane. They then crossed Europe and Asia, ultimately arriving in Beijing with the pumps.

Su founded the Department of Thoracic and Cardiovascular Surgery at the Fourth Military Medical University. On June 26, 1958, he performed the first successful open heart procedure in mainland China, repairing the VSD on a 6-year-old patient using CPB. In 1963, he performed the first aorta-carotid bypass in mainland China using a vascular prosthesis. He was transferred to 301 Hospital in 1972 and served as the first president of the Chinese Society Thoracic and Cardiovascular Surgery from 1988 to 1992.

== Personal life ==
In 2013, Su joined the CCP at the age of 98. He died on July 31, 2018, at the age of 103.
