= Hong Chaosheng =

Chinese physicist

- 洪朝生
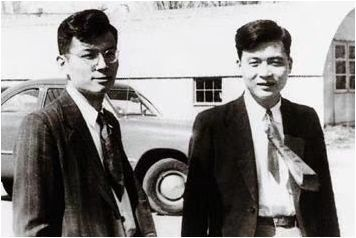
- Hong Chaosheng (left) and Deng Jiaxian (right) in Purdue University in 1950.
- Born: October 10, 1920; Beijing, China
- Died: August 19, 2018 (aged 97); Beijing, China
- Education: Tsinghua University; Massachusetts Institute of Technology
- Spouse: Li Ying
- Scientific career
- Fields: Cryogenics; Semiconductor
- Workplaces: Chinese Academy of Sciences
- Notable students: Zhao Zhongxian

Hong Chaosheng (Chinese: 洪朝生; pinyin: Hóng Cháoshēng; Wade–Giles: Hung Ch'ao-sheng; 10 October 1920 – 19 August 2018) was a Chinese physicist best known for studying cryogenics. Hong was the teacher of Zhao Zhongxian, a laureate of Highest Science and Technology Award, the highest scientific award issued by the Chinese Academy of Sciences to scientists working in China.

He was a delegate to the 3rd National People's Congress. He was a member of the 5th, 6th, 7th and 8th National Committee of the Chinese People's Political Consultative Conference.

== Biography ==
Hong was born in Beijing on October 10, 1920, to Hong Guantao (Chinese: 洪观涛), a railway engineer and member of Tongmenghui, and Gao Junyuan (Chinese: 高君远), daughter of publisher Gao Mengdan (Chinese: 高梦旦). He had two elder sisters, Hong Jing (Chinese: 洪晶) and Hong Ying (Chinese: 洪盈). He primarily studied at the Yuying School (Chinese: 育英学校) and secondary studied at Huiwen High School (Chinese: 汇文学校), both were missionary schools. After high school, he studied at Tsinghua University, and then taught at National Southwestern Associated University. He arrived in the United States in 1945 at the age of 25 to begin his education at Massachusetts Institute of Technology in Cambridge, Massachusetts. After university, he worked at Purdue University. In 1950 he went to Netherlands to work at Leiden University.

He returned to China in 1952 and that year became professor of Department of Physics at Tsinghua University, Peking University and the University of Science and Technology of China. He joined the Jiusan Society. In 1953, he became a researcher at the Institute of Geophysics, Chinese Academy of Sciences, where he was deputy director in 1978. He was accepted as an academician of the Chinese Academy of Sciences in 1980. In September 2005, he was hired as a part-time professor at the Graduate College of Chinese Academy of Sciences.

On August 19, 2018, he died of illness at Beijing, aged 98.

== Personal life ==
Hong married Li Ying (Chinese: 李滢).

== Papers ==
- Hung, C. S.; Gliessman, J. R. (1950-08-15). "The Resistivity and Hall Effect of Germanium at Low Temperatures". Physical Review. 79 (4): 726–727. Bibcode:1950PhRv...79..726H. doi:10.1103/PhysRev.79.726. ISSN 0031-899X.
- Hung, C. S. (1950-08-15). "Theory of Resistivity and Hall Effect at Very Low Temperatures". Physical Review. 79 (4): 727–728. Bibcode:1950PhRv...79..727H. doi:10.1103/PhysRev.79.727. ISSN 0031-899X.
- Hung, C. S.; Johnson, V. A. (1950-08-01). "Resistivity of Semiconductors Containing Both Acceptors and Donors". Physical Review. 79 (3): 535–536. Bibcode:1950PhRv...79..535H. doi:10.1103/PhysRev.79.535. ISSN 0031-899X.
- Hung, C. S. (1950-01-01). "Thermionic Emission from Oxide Cathodes: Retarding and Accelerating Fields". Journal of Applied Physics. 21 (1): 37–44. Bibcode:1950JAP....21...37H. doi:10.1063/1.1699417. hdl:1721.1/4920. ISSN 0021-8979.
- Baum, R. M.; Hung, C. S. (1952-10-01). "Activation Energy of Heat Treatment Introduced Lattice Defects in Germanium". Physical Review. 88 (1): 134–135. Bibcode:1952PhRv...88..134B. doi:10.1103/PhysRev.88.134.2. ISSN 0031-899X.
- Hung, C.S.; Hunt, B.; Winkel, P. (1952). "Transport phenomena of liouid helium II in narrow slits". Physica. 18 (8–9): 629–645. Bibcode:1952Phy....18..629H. doi:10.1016/S0031-8914(52)80062-X.
- Hung, C. S.; Gliessman, J. R. (1954-12-01). "Resistivity and Hall Effect of Germanium at Low Temperatures". Physical Review. 96 (5): 1226–1236. Bibcode:1954PhRv...96.1226H. doi:10.1103/PhysRev.96.1226. ISSN 0031-899X.
- Li, L.-F.; Hong, C.-S.; Li, Y.-Y.; Zhang, Z. (1996). "Martensitic transformation in ZrO_{2}-based ceramics at cryogenic temperatures". Cryogenics. 36 (1): 7–11. Bibcode:1996Cryo...36....7L. doi:10.1016/0011-2275(96)80762-4.

== Awards ==
- 1989 Hu Gangfu Physical Award of Chinese Physical Society
- 2000 International Cryogenic Engineering Council Mendelsohn Prize
- 2011 Samuel Corinth Prize
