= Sarah Allan =

American historian

- Born: Sarah Meyers; 1945 (age 80–81)
- Education: University of California, Los Angeles (BA); University of California, Berkeley (MA, PhD)
- Spouse: Nicol Allan (m. 1963; died 2019)

Sarah Allan (simplified Chinese: 艾兰; traditional Chinese: 艾蘭; pinyin: Ài Lán; born 1945) is an American paleographer and scholar of ancient China. She was a Burlington Northern Foundation Professor of Asian Studies in the Department of Asian and Middle Eastern Languages and Literatures at Dartmouth College; she is currently affiliated to the University of California, Berkeley. She is Chair for the Society for the Study of Early China and Editor of Early China. Previously, she was Senior Lecturer in Chinese at the School of Oriental and African Studies at the University of London. She is best known for her interdisciplinary approach to the mythological and philosophical systems of early Chinese civilization.

== Biography ==
Allan received a B.A. degree in 1966 from the University of California, Los Angeles, and her M.A. and Ph.D. degrees in 1969 and 1974 respectively from the University of California, Berkeley. At UCLA, she studied archaeology with Richard Rudolph and took a course in Chinese art history with J. Leroy Davidson, and she studied under Peter Boodberg and Wolfram Eberhard at Berkeley. She has published widely in English and Chinese (as Ai Lan 艾兰).

In her work, Allan has presented an attempt to reconstruct the basic concepts of the mythology of China's Shang dynasty based on evidence from a number of sources, including Shang inscriptions (primarily from oracle bones, as well as bronzes), myths and stories recorded during the Zhou and Han dynasties that followed the Shang, which appear to be derived from Shang sources, as well as archaeological data. Her works have been translated into both Chinese and Korean. Her most recent book is Buried Ideas: Legends of Abdication and Ideal Government in Recently Discovered Early Chinese Bamboo-slip Manuscripts (SUNY Press, 2015), which discusses four Warring States period (475-221 BC) bamboo-slip texts about Yao's abdication to Shun, centering on issues of meritocracy and hereditary succession.

Allan has also collaborated extensively with Chinese scholars, Li Xueqin 李学勤 and Qi Wenxin 齐文心 in particular, in publishing Chinese materials in Western collections in order to make them available to scholars in China. Another area of collaboration is her organization of international conferences and workshops on Chinese excavated texts.

For a time, Allan was Senior Lecturer in Chinese at the School of Oriental and African Studies at the University of London. Until 2019, she was Burlington Northern Foundation Professor of Asian Studies in the Department of Asian and Middle Eastern Languages and Literatures at Dartmouth College. She currently resides in California. She is Chair for the Society for the Study of Early China and Editor of Early China.

Allan was married to the artist Nicol Allan, who died in 2019.

== Selected works ==
=== Monographs ===
- Allan, Sarah (2015), Buried Ideas: Legends of Abdication and Ideal Government in Recently Discovered Early Chinese Bamboo-slip Manuscripts, SUNY series in philosophy and culture, SUNY Press, ISBN 978-1-43845-777-2
- Allan, Sarah (1997), The Way of Water and Sprouts of Virtue, SUNY series in Chinese philosophy and culture, SUNY Press, ISBN 978-0-7914-3386-7
- Allan, Sarah (1991), The Shape of the Turtle: Myth, Art, and Cosmos in Early China, SUNY series in Chinese philosophy and culture, SUNY Press, ISBN 978-0-7914-0460-7
- Allan, Sarah (1981), The Heir and the Sage: Dynastic Legend in Early China, Issue 24 of Asian library series, Chinese Materials Center, ISBN 978-0-89644-636-6

=== Collaborative works ===
- Li Xueqin; Qi Wenxin; Allan, Sarah, eds. (1999), Ruidian Sidegeermo Yuandong Guwu Bowuguan Cang Jiagu Wenzi 瑞典斯德哥爾摩遠東古物博物館藏甲骨文字, Zhonghua Shuju, ISBN 978-7-10102-256-8
- Li Xueqin; Allan, Sarah, eds. (1995), Ouzhou Suocang Zhongguo Qingtongqu Yizhu 歐洲所藏中國青銅器遺珠 (Chinese Bronzes: A Selection from European Collections), Wenwu Press, ISBN 978-7-501-00624-3
- Li Xueqin; Qi Wenxin; Allan, Sarah (eds.), Oracle Bones Collections in Great Britain (Yingguo suo Cang Jiagu Ji 英國所藏甲骨集), Zhonghua Shuju, ISBN 978-7-101-00955-2, OCLC 638728434
  - Vol. 1 (1985)
  - Vol. 2 (1992)

=== Articles ===
- Allan, Sarah (2015), "'When Red Pigeons Gathered on Tang's house': A Warring States Period Tale of Shamanic Possession and Building Construction Set at the Turn of the Xia and Shang Dynasties", Journal of the Royal Asiatic Society, Series 3 (2015): 419–438, doi:10.1017/S1356186314000923, S2CID 157955102
- Allan 艾蘭, Sarah (2013), "The Life of a Chinese Historian in Tumultuous Times: Interviews with Li Xueqin, Part One", Early China, 35–36 (2012–13): 1–35, doi:10.1017/S0362502800000419, S2CID 232154262
- Allan, Sarah (October 2012), "On Shu 書 ('Documents') and the Origin of the Shang shu 尚書 ('Ancient Documents') in Light of Recently Discovered Bamboo Slip Manuscripts", Bulletin of the School of Oriental and African Studies, 75.3 (October 2012): 547–557, doi:10.1017/s0041977x12000547
- Allan, Sarah (2010), "Abdication and Utopian Vision in the Bamboo Slip Manuscript, 'Rongchengshi'", Chinese Philosophy in Excavated Early Texts, Supplement to Journal of Chinese Philosophy, 37 (2010): 67–85, doi:10.1111/j.1540-6253.2010.01621.x
- "He Flies like a Bird, He Dives like a Dragon, Who is that Man in the Animal Mouth? Shamanic images in Shang and Western Zhou Art", Orientations, 41, number 3 (April 2010): 45–51
- Allan, Sarah (2009), "Not the Lun yu: The Chu Script Bamboo Slip Manuscript, 'Zi Gao', and the Nature of Early Confucianism", Bulletin of the School of Oriental and African Studies, 72 (2009): 115–151, doi:10.1017/s0041977x0900007x, JSTOR 40378848, S2CID 162500383
- Allan, Sarah (2007), "On the Identity of Shang Di and the Origin of the Concept of a Celestial Mandate (tian ming 天命)", Early China, 31 (2007): 1–46, doi:10.1017/S0362502800001796, JSTOR 23354211, S2CID 159662391
- Allan, Sarah (2007), "Erlitou and the Formation of Chinese Chinese Civilization: Toward a New Paradigm", Journal of Asian Studies, 66.2 (May 2007): 461–497, doi:10.1017/S002191180700054X, S2CID 162264919
- Allan, Sarah (2003), "The Great One, Water, and the Laozi: New Light from Guodian", T'oung Pao, 89.4/5 (December 2003): 237–285, doi:10.1163/156853203773644358, JSTOR 4528939

=== Works translated into Chinese ===
- Allan, Sarah (2010-2011), Ai Lan Wenji 艾兰文集 (Collected Works of Sarah Allan), Commercial Press
  - Vol. 1 (2010), Gui zhi Mi: Shangdai Shenhua, Jisi, Yishu he Yuzhouguan Yanjiu 龟之谜：商代神话，祭祀，艺术，和宇宙观研究 (revised and expanded edition), ISBN 978-7-100-07361-5 - translated by Wang Tao
  - Vol. 2 (2010), Shui zhi Dao yu De zhi Duan: Zhongguo Zaoqi Zhexuesixiang de Benyu 水之道与德之端：中国早期哲学思想的本喻 (revised and expanded edition), ISBN 978-7-100-07488-9
  - Vol. 3 (2010), Shixi yu Shanrang 世袭与禅让 (new translation, expanded edition), ISBN 978-7-100-07538-1
  - Vol. 4 (2011), Zaoqi Zhongguo Lishi, Sixiang, yu Wenhua 早期中国历史，思想与文化 (revised and expanded edition), ISBN 978-7-100-08414-7

=== Edited volumes ===
- Chang, Kwang-chih; Xu Pingfang; Allan, Sarah (2005), The Formation of Chinese Civilization: An Archaeological Perspective, Culture & civilization of China, Yale University Press, ISBN 978-0-300-09382-7
- Allan, Sarah; Wen, Xing, eds. (2004), Xinchu Jianbo Yanjiu: Xinchu Jianbo Guoji Xueshu Yantaohui Wenji 2000 Nian 8 Yue Beijing 新出简帛研究：新出简帛国际学术研讨会文集2000年8月北京 (Studies on Recently Discovered Chinese Manuscripts: Proceedings of the International Conference on Recently Discovered Manuscripts, August, 2000), Wenwu Press, ISBN 978-7-50101-685-3
- Allan, Sarah; Williams, Crispin, eds. (2000), The Guodian Laozi: Proceedings of the International Conference, Dartmouth College, May 1998, Issue 5 of Early China special monograph series, The Society for the Study of Early China and Institute of East Asian Studies, University of California, ISBN 978-1-55729-069-4
- Allan, Sarah; Cohen, Alvin P., eds. (1979), Legend, Lore, and Religion in China: Essays in Honor of Wolfram Eberhard on his Seventieth Birthday, Issue 13 of Asian library series, Chinese Materials Center, ISBN 978-0-89644-584-0
