= Liu Guangding =

Chinese geologist (1929–2018)

- 刘光鼎
- Born: December 29, 1929; Beijing, China
- Died: August 7, 2018 (aged 88); Beijing, China
- Education: Peking University
- Children: 2
- Scientific career
- Fields: Geophysics
- Workplaces: Chinese Academy of Sciences

Liu Guangding (simplified Chinese: 刘光鼎; traditional Chinese: 劉光鼎; pinyin: Liǘ Guāngdǐng; 29 December 1929 – 7 August 2018) was a Chinese geophysicist best known for his work in geophysics, marine geology and petroleum geology. He had been hailed as "Father of Chinese marine geology". He was a member of the 8th and 9th National Committee of the Chinese People's Political Consultative Conference.

== Biography ==
Liu was born in Beijing on December 29, 1929, with his ancestral home in Penglai, Shandong. His father Liu Benzhao (Chinese: 刘本钊) was a scholar.

During the Second Sino-Japanese War, Liu's father fled Japanese-occupied Shandong. In 1940, his eldest brother Li Guangdou (刘光斗) became deranged and went missing after being arrested and tortured by the Japanese. Devastated by the loss, his mother Dong Lin committed suicide at the age of 48.

In September 1941, Liu moved to Beijing to live with his uncle. He was educated at Jingcun Middle School and Chengda Middle School, before going on to study at Fu Jen Catholic High School. In 1947 he was accepted to Shandong University. On September 9, 1948. Liu joined the Chinese Communist Party under the introduction of Zhang Shuowen (Chinese: 张硕文). That same year, he entered Peking University and then taught there for more than 12 years.

In 1958, he organized China's first marine geophysical exploration team and headed the team. During the Cultural Revolution, Liu suffered political persecution. In 1980 he was elected a fellow of the Chinese Academy of Sciences, where he served as director of its Institute of Geophysics from 1989 to 1993. In 1993 he was elected director-general of Chinese Geophysical Society. In 1998 he was elected an academician of The World Academy of Sciences. Liu won two second prizes of the State Natural Science Award, in 1982 and 1995, respectively.

Liu died on August 7, 2018, aged 89.

== Personal life ==
Liu had a son and a daughter.

== Awards ==
- Science and Technology Award of the Ho Leung Ho Lee Foundation
- Second Class Prize of State Natural Science Award
- Li Siguang Science Honor Award
- Special Prize for Technology and Progress of the Chinese Academy of Sciences

Academic offices
Preceded by Chen Zongji (陈宗基)	Director of Institute of Geophysics, Chinese Academy of Sciences; 1989-1993	Succeeded by Xu Wenyao (徐文耀)
