= Li Tian =

Chinese physicist and aircraft designer

- 李天
- Born: 2 October 1938; Jilin City, Jilin, Manchukuo
- Died: 11 April 2018 (aged 79); Shenyang, Liaoning, China
- Education: Tsinghua University
- Scientific career
- Fields: Aerodynamics
- Workplaces: Shenyang Aircraft Design Institute, Beihang University

Li Tian (Chinese: 李天; pinyin: Lǐ Tiān; Wade–Giles: Li T'ien; 2 October 1938 – 11 April 2018) was a Chinese physicist and aircraft designer. An expert in aerodynamics for aeronautics, he served as chief scientist of the Shenyang Aircraft Corporation. He was also an adjunct professor at Beihang University.

== Biography ==
Li was born in October 1938 in Jilin City, Jilin province. He graduated from Tsinghua University in 1963 with a degree in fluid mechanics. He was assigned to the then 601 Institute as a technician afterwards, and was banished to western Liaoning during the Cultural Revolution.

Li was responsible for the aerodynamic projects when developing Shenyang J-8 and Shenyang J-11, he is known as one of the founders of Chinese stealth technology for aircraft. He improved Chinese fighter configurations and stealthy designs by combining electromagnetic scattering characteristics with aerodynamic theory.

Li was elected as an academician of the Chinese Academy of Sciences in 2005.

Li's father, Li Pengshu, taught Chinese literature at a high school. Li was the third of five children. After his mother died in 1948, his father remarried in 1950 and had two more children. Li died on 11 April 2018 in Shenyang, aged 79.
