= Southwest University of Science and Technology =

Provincial public university in Mianyang, Sichuan, China

- 西南科技大学 (Chinese)
- Motto: 厚德、博学、笃行、创新
- Type: Public university
- Established: 2000
- President: Zhu Xiaohua
- Party Secretary: Yang Junhui
- Faculty: 2,261 (2026)
- Total staff: 2,793 (2026)
- Students: 40,355 (2026)
- Undergraduates: 33,371 (2026)
- Postgraduates: 6,483 (2026)
- Doctoral students: 501 (2026)
- Other students: 253 (2026)
- Location: Mianyang, Sichuan, China
- Campus: 2.768 square kilometres (684 acres); Urban
- Colors: SWUST Blue
- Website: www.swust.edu.cn

Chinese name
- Simplified Chinese: 西南科技大学
- Traditional Chinese: 西南科技大學
Transcriptions
Standard Mandarin
- Hanyu Pinyin: Xīnán Kējì Dàxué

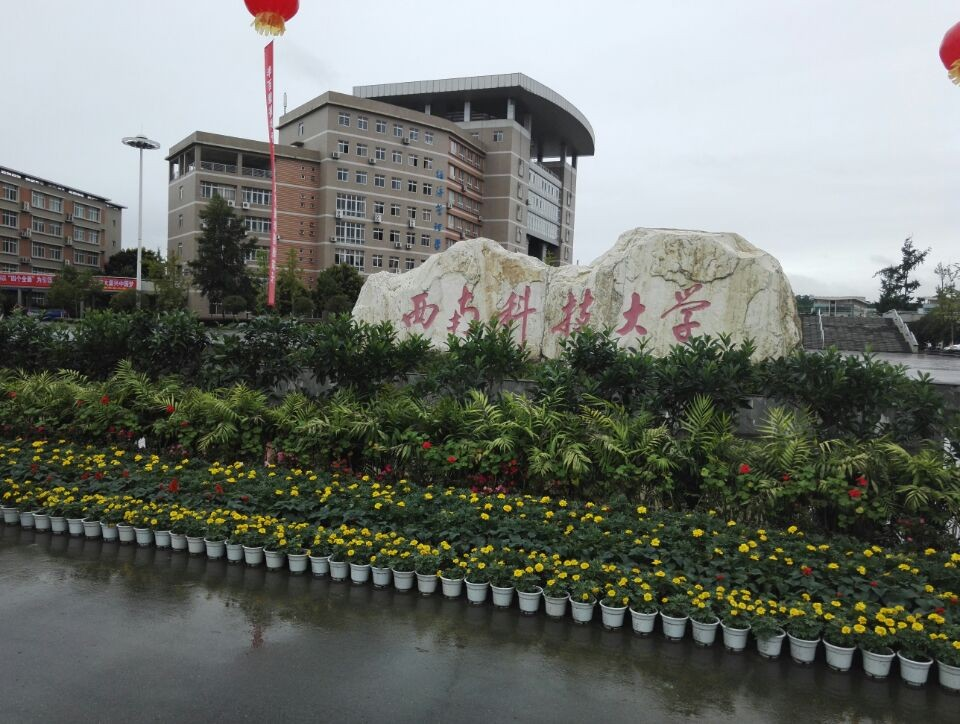
East gate

The Southwest University of Science and Technology (SWUST) is a provincial public university in Mianyang, Sichuan, China. It was officially established on 23 August 2000 by a merger of the Southwest Institute of Technology and Mianyang Economic and Technical College. It is operated by the Sichuan Provincial People's Government, and co-constructed with the Ministry of Education and SASTIND.

== History ==
The university originated with the 1939 founding of the Sichuan Jiangjin Ceramics Vocational and Technical School and the Sichuan Provincial Advanced Agricultural Vocational School, which occurred during the Sino-Japanese War. The campus was originally the Mianyang branch of Tsinghua University.

== Department ==
There are 20 departments, colleges, and schools:

- School of Continuing Education
- Department of International Cooperation and Exchange
- College of Physical Education and Health
- School of Applied Technology
- School of Chinese Literature and Arts
- School of Civil Engineering and Architecture
- School of Computer Science and Technology (School of Software)
- School of Economy and Management
- School of Environment and Resource
- School of Foreign Languages and Cultures
- School of Information and Control Engineering
- School of Law
- School of Life Science and Agri-forestry
- School of Manufacturing Science and Engineering
- School of Materials and Chemistry
- School of National Defense (School of Nuclear Science and Technology)
- School of Mathematics and Physics
- School of Aeronautics and Astronautics
- School of Medicine
- School of Marxism

== See also ==
- Lin Xiangdi, former president of Southwest University of Science and Technology
