= Gao Jindian =

Chinese politician and army officer (1939–2018)

- 高金钿

Vice-President of the National Defence University of People's Liberation Army
- In office August 1998 – July 2003
- President: Xing Shizhong (邢世忠)

Personal details
- Born: October 1939 Jinan, Shandong, China
- Died: December 13, 2018 (aged 79) Beijing, China
- Party: Chinese Communist Party
- Education: National Defence University of People's Liberation Army

Military service
- Allegiance: People's Republic of China
- Branch/service: People's Liberation Army Navy
- Years of service: 1962-2017
- Rank: Lieutenant general

Chinese name
- Traditional Chinese: 高金鈿
- Simplified Chinese: 高金钿
Transcriptions
Standard Mandarin
- Hanyu Pinyin: Gāo Jīndiàn

Gao Jindian (Chinese: 高金钿; October 1939 – 13 December 2018) was a Chinese army officer and politician, lieutenant general of the People's Liberation Army (PLA).

He was a member of the 10th National Committee of the Chinese People's Political Consultative Conference.

== Biography ==
Gao was born in Jinan, Shandong in October 1940. He graduated from the Dezhou No. 2 High School. In 1960 he joined the Communist Youth League of China. He enlisted in the army in July 1962, and joined the Chinese Communist Party in 1970. He joined the People's Liberation Army National Defense University in 1986, and was promoted to vice president in 1998.

He was promoted to the rank of major general (shaojiang) in 1995 and lieutenant general (zhongjiang) in 1999.

On December 13, 2018, he died of illness in Beijing, aged 79.
