= Zhou Yaohe =

- 周尧和
- Born: May 1927; Beijing, Republic of China
- Died: 30 July 2018 (aged 91); Shanghai, China
- Education: Tsinghua University, Moscow Institute of Steel
- Scientific career
- Fields: Materials science
- Workplaces: Northwestern Polytechnical University, Shanghai Jiao Tong University

Zhou Yaohe (Chinese: 周尧和; pinyin: Zhōu Yáohé; Wade–Giles: Chou Yao-ho May 1927 – 30 July 2018) was a Chinese materials scientist. He was elected as academician of the Chinese Academy of Science in 1991.

Born in May 1927, Zhou attended Tsinghua University. He went to the Soviet Union in 1953, and returned to China with a Candidate of Sciences degree from the Moscow Institute of Steel, in 1957. He specialized in solidification theory and technology for metal casting, and developed a new method of metal casting, which is used to produce aluminium alloy for aerospace engineering. He received the highest award of Chinese aviation industry in 1991.

He died on 30 July 2018 at Huadong Hospital in Shanghai, aged 91.
