= Wang Huanyu =

Chinese physicist (1954–2018)

- 王焕玉
- Born: December 29, 1954; Wen'an County, Langfang, Hebei, China
- Died: November 4, 2018 (aged 63); Hefei, Anhui, China
- Education: University of Science and Technology of China
- Scientific career
- Fields: Astrophysics; Space exploration
- Workplaces: Institute of High Energy Physics

Chinese name
- Traditional Chinese: 王煥玉
- Simplified Chinese: 王焕玉
Transcriptions
Standard Mandarin
- Hanyu Pinyin: Wāng Huànyù

Wang Huanyu (Chinese: 王焕玉; 29 December 1954 – 4 November 2018) was a Chinese physicist who served as Communist Party Secretary and deputy director of the Institute of High Energy Physics, Chinese Academy of Sciences between March 2003 and October 2014. Wang made a significant contribution to China's lunar exploration project.

== Biography ==
Wang was born in Wen'an County, Hebei, in December 1954. After graduating from the University of Science and Technology of China in November 1978, he was assigned to the Institute of High Energy Physics, Chinese Academy of Sciences, where he was Chinese Communist Party Committee Secretary and deputy director between March 2003 and October 2014. He joined the Chinese Communist Party in September 1978.

Wang was a professor and doctoral supervisor at the University of Science and Technology of China. He was a managing director of the China Nuclear Instrument Association and Chinese Academy of Space Sciences. He was a deputy director of the Space exploration Specialized Committee.

On November 4, 2018, Wang died of a heart attack while he was making a presentation at an academic conference in Hefei, Anhui province.

== Awards ==
- 1998 Special Government Allowance
- 2004 Second Prize of the National Science and Technology Progress Award and Army Science and Technology Progress Award
- 2009 Special Prize of the National Science and Technology Progress Award
- 2011 National Labor Medal
