= Ai Weiren =

Chinese military personnel

- Native name: 艾维仁
- Born: 1932; Haicheng, Liaoning, Manchukuo (now China)
- Died: June 29, 2018 (aged 85–86); Shenyang, Liaoning, China
- Allegiance: People's Republic of China
- Rank: Lieutenant general
- Battles / wars: Chinese Civil War; Korean War

Ai Weiren (Chinese: 艾维仁; 1932 – 29 June 2018) was a lieutenant general of the Chinese People's Liberation Army. He fought in the Chinese Civil War and the Korean War, and served as Deputy Political Commissar of the Chengdu Military Region and of the Shenyang Military Region.

== Biography ==
Ai was born in Haicheng, Liaoning Province. He enlisted in the People's Liberation Army in March 1948 and joined the Chinese Communist Party in May 1949. He fought in the Liaoshen Campaign, Western Hubei Campaign, and the Southwest Campaign during the Chinese Civil War, as well as the Korean War after the establishment of the People's Republic of China.

Ai rose through the ranks and served as Deputy Political Commissar of the Chengdu Military Region and of the Shenyang Military Region, He was awarded the rank of major general in 1988, and was promoted to lieutenant general in 1990. He was a member of the 13th National Congress of the Chinese Communist Party, and a member of the 14th Central Commission for Discipline Inspection.

Ai died in Shenyang, Liaoning on 29 June 2018, at the age of 86.
