= Wendeng, Weihai =

Wendeng 文登区 Wenteng
- District
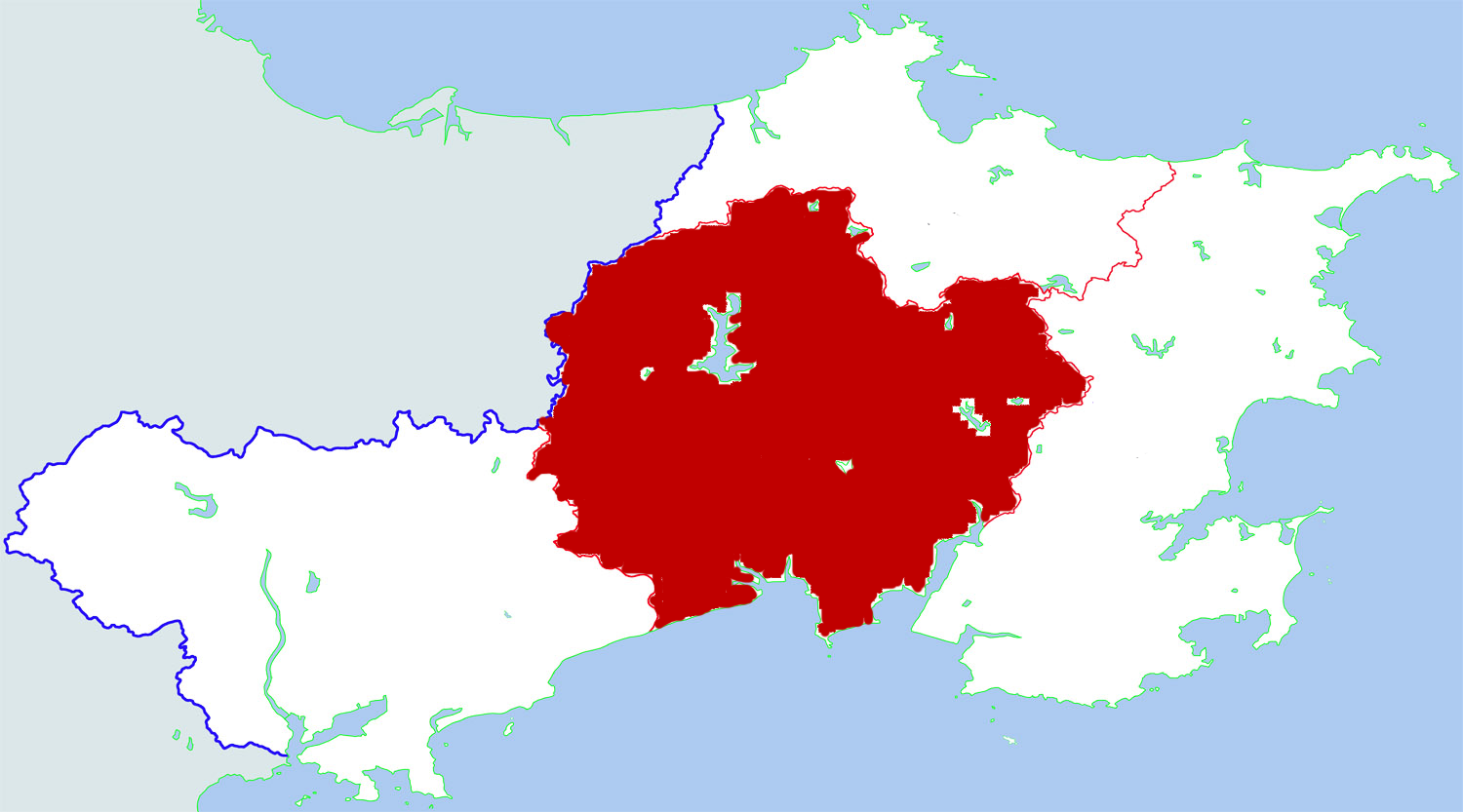
- Location in Weihai

- Location in Shandong
- Coordinates: 37°11′38″N 122°03′29″E
- Country: People's Republic of China
- Province: Shandong
- Prefecture-level city: Weihai

Area
  - Total: 1,616 km^{2} (624 sq mi)

Population (2019)
  - Total: 593,100
  - Density: 367.0/km^{2} (950.6/sq mi)
- Time zone: UTC+8 (China Standard)
- Postal code: 264400
- Website: www.wendeng.gov.cn/Index.html

Wendeng District (Chinese: 文登区; pinyin: Wéndēng Qū) is a district of Weihai, Shandong province, China. Wendeng is primarily an industrial based area, with a large minority of citizens working as farmers. Wendeng was originally a county, then converted to a county-level city in 1988, then converted to an urban district in March 2014.

== Administrative divisions ==
As of 2017, this district is divided to 3 subdistricts, 12 towns and 1 other. 86 WenShan East Road, District Government.

Subdistricts

- Longshanlu Subdistrict (龙山路街道)
- Tianfulu Subdistrict (天福路街道)
- Huanshanlu Subdistrict (环山路街道)

Towns

- Wendengying (文登营镇)
- Dashuipo (大水泊镇)
- Zhangjiachan (张家产镇)
- Gaocun (高村镇)
- Zeku (泽库镇)
- Houjia (侯家镇)
- Songcun (宋村镇)
- Zetou (泽头镇)
- Xiaoguan (小观镇)
- Gejia (葛家镇)
- Mishan (米山镇)
- Jieshi (界石镇)

Others

- Wendeng Development Zone (文登开发区)

== Population ==
As of the end of 2024, Wendeng District had a permanent resident population of 547,200, including 342,600 urban residents, with an urbanization rate of 62.61%. The registered (hukou) population totaled 548,500, of which 274,400 were urban residents, representing an urbanization rate of 50.03%.

== Climate ==
Climate data for Wendeng, elevation 118 m (387 ft), (1991–2020 normals, extremes 1981–present)
Month	Jan	Feb	Mar	Apr	May	Jun	Jul	Aug	Sep	Oct	Nov	Dec	Year
Record high °C (°F)	12.8 (55.0)	19.0 (66.2)	27.2 (81.0)	29.0 (84.2)	33.6 (92.5)	35.6 (96.1)	36.4 (97.5)	36.7 (98.1)	33.5 (92.3)	30.0 (86.0)	23.5 (74.3)	17.6 (63.7)	36.7 (98.1)
Mean daily maximum °C (°F)	2.4 (36.3)	4.8 (40.6)	10.0 (50.0)	16.6 (61.9)	22.6 (72.7)	26.4 (79.5)	28.7 (83.7)	29.0 (84.2)	25.8 (78.4)	19.8 (67.6)	12.1 (53.8)	5.0 (41.0)	16.9 (62.5)
Daily mean °C (°F)	−1.8 (28.8)	0.1 (32.2)	4.8 (40.6)	11.2 (52.2)	17.2 (63.0)	21.6 (70.9)	24.8 (76.6)	25.0 (77.0)	20.9 (69.6)	14.6 (58.3)	7.5 (45.5)	0.8 (33.4)	12.2 (54.0)
Mean daily minimum °C (°F)	−5.1 (22.8)	−3.5 (25.7)	0.9 (33.6)	6.9 (44.4)	12.7 (54.9)	17.9 (64.2)	21.9 (71.4)	21.8 (71.2)	16.8 (62.2)	10.2 (50.4)	3.7 (38.7)	−2.5 (27.5)	8.5 (47.3)
Record low °C (°F)	−18.2 (−0.8)	−17.8 (0.0)	−9.5 (14.9)	−5.9 (21.4)	1.0 (33.8)	7.7 (45.9)	14.8 (58.6)	12.1 (53.8)	5.3 (41.5)	−2.0 (28.4)	−10.6 (12.9)	−19.0 (−2.2)	−19.0 (−2.2)
Average precipitation mm (inches)	14.4 (0.57)	15.6 (0.61)	19.7 (0.78)	43.5 (1.71)	61.9 (2.44)	82.8 (3.26)	181.5 (7.15)	189.2 (7.45)	70.9 (2.79)	28.4 (1.12)	35.7 (1.41)	27.2 (1.07)	770.8 (30.36)
Average precipitation days (≥ 0.1 mm)	6.6	4.8	4.3	5.8	7.9	8.2	12.3	11.0	7.4	5.9	6.7	8.6	89.5
Average snowy days	8.1	4.7	1.8	0.2	0	0	0	0	0	0.2	2.7	8.9	26.6
Average relative humidity (%)	67	65	62	61	65	75	83	83	74	69	69	68	70
Mean monthly sunshine hours	161.3	174.7	221.5	233.1	250.3	212.2	164.6	189.1	209.2	208.2	162.4	149.5	2,336.1
Percentage possible sunshine	52	57	59	59	57	48	37	45	57	61	54	50	53
Source: China Meteorological Administrationall-time July highall-time extreme temperature

== Transport ==
- Weihai Dashuipo Airport
- China National Highway 309
- Yanji Expressway
- Qingwei Expressway
- Shandong Provincial Highway 204
- Shandong Provincial Highway 804
- Shandong Provincial Highway 901

== Friendship Cities ==
- Cheonan-si, South Chungcheong, South Korea
