= Xi'an University of Architecture and Technology =

University in Xi'an, China

- 西安建筑科技大学
- Type: Public university
- Established: 1895; 131 years ago
- Undergraduates: 26,000
- Postgraduates: 3,600
- Location: Xi'an, Shaanxi, China; 34.2402°N 108.9617°E
- Website: www.xauat.edu.cn

Xi'an University of Architecture and Technology (XAUAT) is one of China's eight historic institutions specializing in architecture, civil and environmental engineering. It was once a key university directly overseen by the former Ministry of Metallurgical Industry. Located in Xi'an, Shaanxi Province, its roots can be traced back to Peiyang University, founded in 1895. During the nationwide restructuring of China's higher education system in 1956, XAUAT was formed through the merger of the Northeast Institute of Technology, Northwest Institute of Technology, Qingdao Institute of Technology, and the civil engineering, construction, and environmental departments of the South Jiangsu Polytechnic Institute. The university was renamed Xi'an Metallurgical Institute in 1959 and later Xi'an Metallurgical and Architectural Institute in 1963. It adopted its current name, Xi'an University of Architecture and Technology, in March 1994.

== History ==
The history of Xi'an University of Architecture and Technology (XAUAT) dates back to the founding of the Beiyang Western Academy (Chinese: 北洋西学学堂) in Tianjin in 1895. In 1956, during a nationwide restructuring of higher education institutions, XAUAT was established through the merger of the former Northeast Institute of Technology, Northwest Institute of Technology, Qingdao Institute of Technology, and the Civil, Architecture, and Municipal departments of the South Jiangsu Polytechnic Institute. This merger brought together the core disciplines of civil engineering, architecture, and environmental studies, marking a significant milestone in the history of higher education in China. The institution was renamed Xi'an Metallurgical College in 1959 and later Xi'an Metallurgical and Architectural College in 1963. On March 8, 1994, it was officially renamed Xi'an University of Architecture and Technology (Chinese: 西安建筑科技大学) with the approval of the State Education Commission. In 1998, the university's administration was transferred to the People's Government of Shaanxi Province.

== Rankings ==
=== Comprehensive ranking ===
- Academic Ranking of World Universities (ARWU): 801-900 globally

=== Ranking by Subject ===
- QS World University Rankings: Global 151-200 Rankings in Architecture and Built Environment in 2023
- US News&World Report: Ranked 66th globally for civil engineering, 92nd globally for environmental engineering, and 178th globally for chemical engineering

== Gallery ==
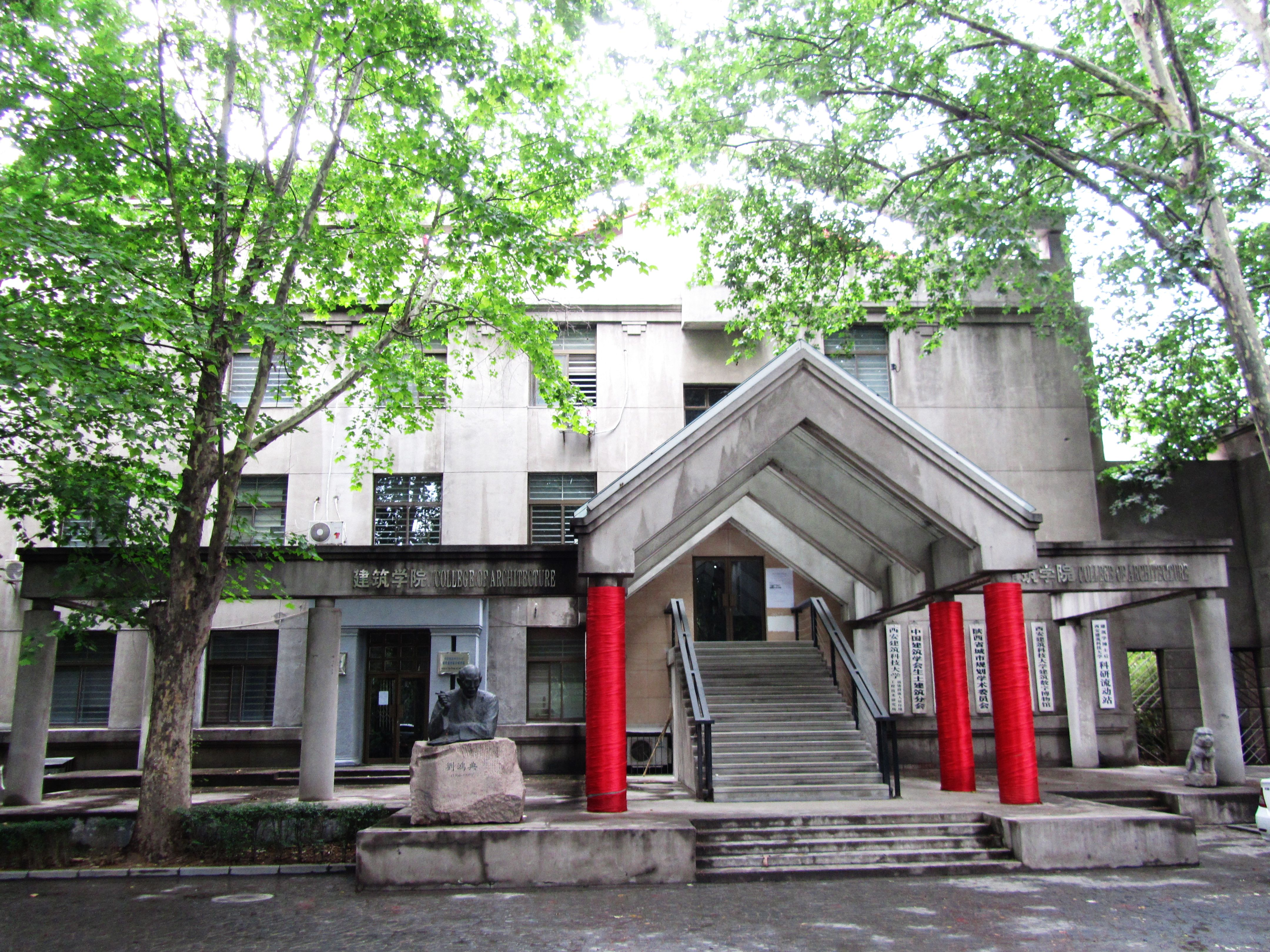
School of Architecture

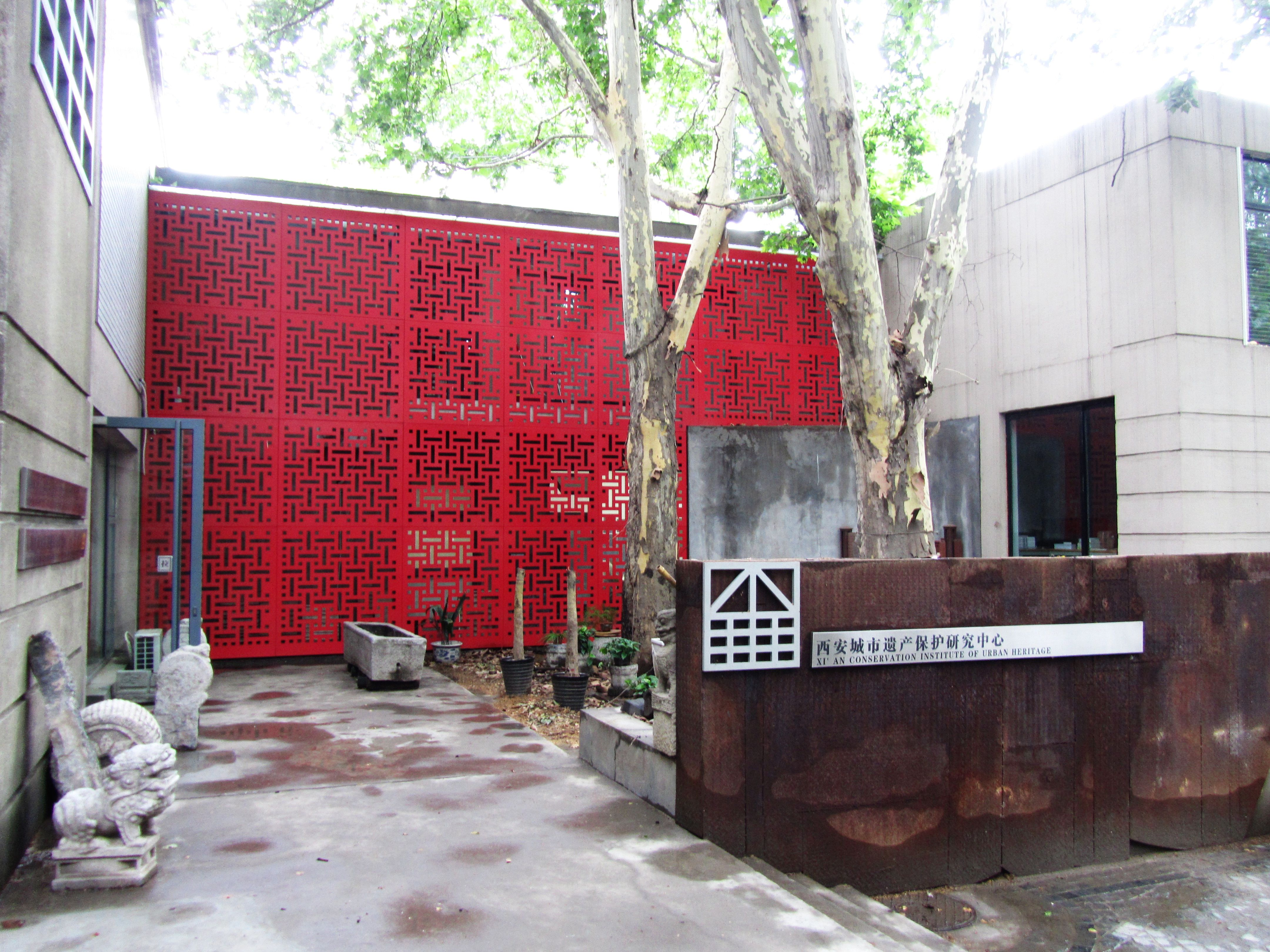
Xi'an Conservation Institute of Urban Heritage

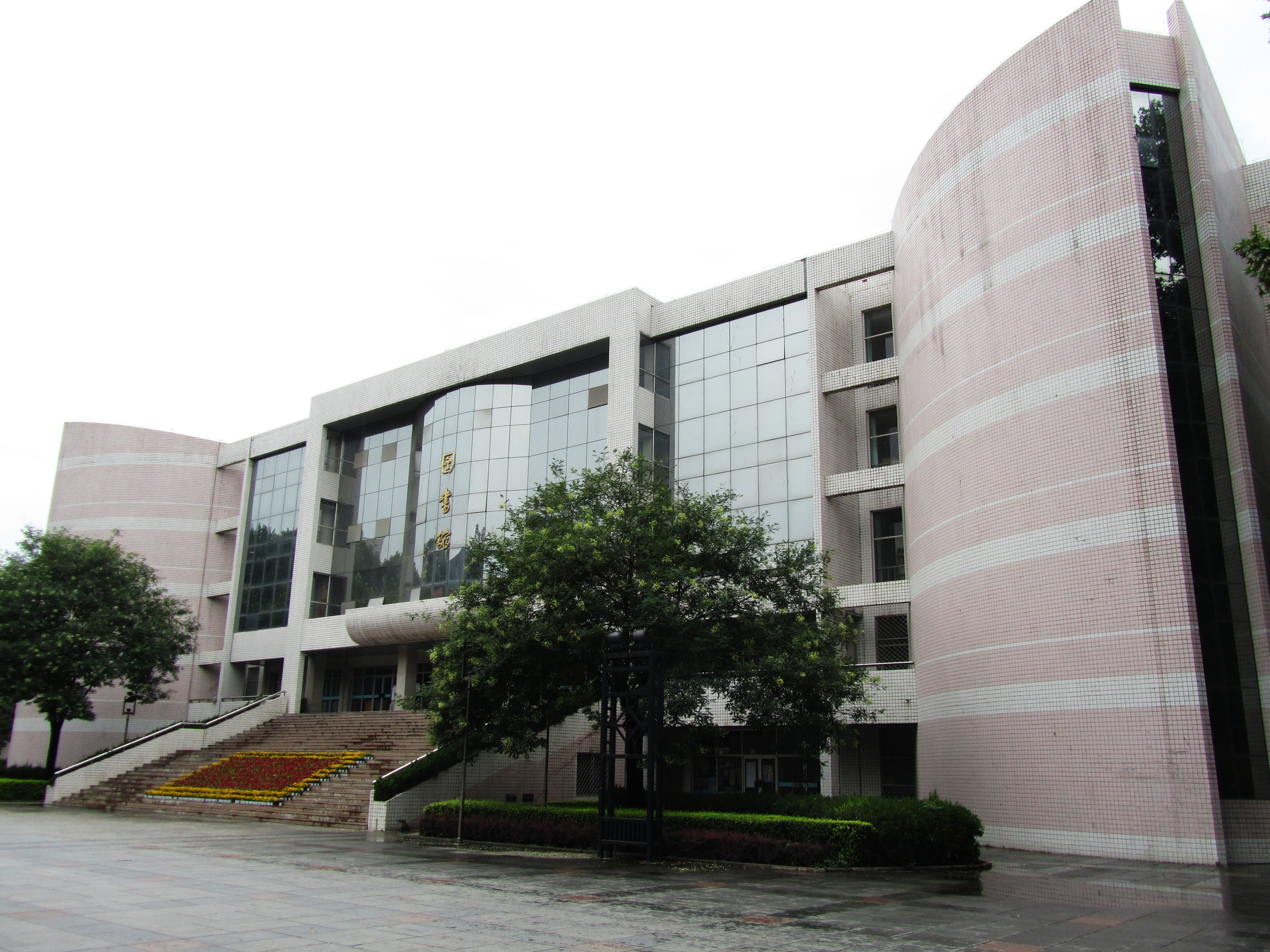
Library

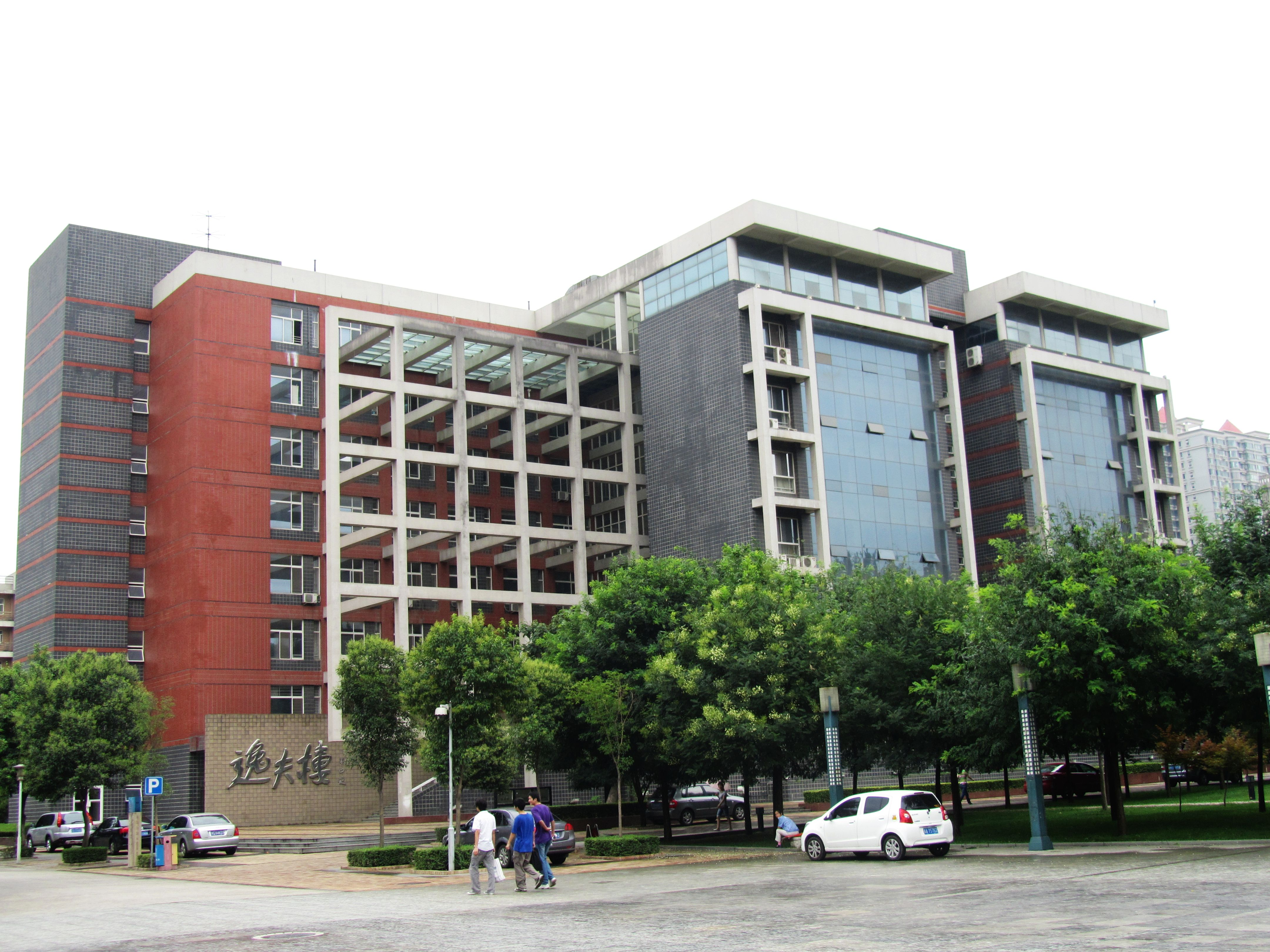
Yifu Building
