= Ai Xing (engineer) =

Chinese mechanical engineer

Ai Xing (Chinese: 艾兴; 24 August 1924 – 7 April 2018) was a Chinese mechanical engineer and educator who specialized in high-speed machining (HSM) and tool materials. He was a longtime professor at Shandong University and its predecessor Shandong University of Technology, and an academician of the Chinese Academy of Engineering.

== Biography ==
Ai Xing was born 24 August 1924 in Dongxiang, Jiangxi, Republic of China. After graduating from Xiamen University in 1948 with a bachelor of engineering degree, he was hired by the university as a faculty member.

In September 1953, he moved to the Shandong University of Technology (山东工业大学), where he taught as a lecturer, associate professor, and then professor for the next 47 years. After the university was merged into Shandong University in July 2000, he became a professor of the School of Engineering of Shandong University.

Ai specialized in high-speed machining and tool materials. He developed six types of ceramics machining tools, three of which were the first of their kind in the world. He also developed computer software for machine tools. He published more than 360 scientific papers and nine monographs and textbooks. He also educated 33 doctoral students and more than 40 master students. He won more than 10 national, ministerial, or provincial science and technology prizes, and was elected to the Chinese Academy of Engineering in 1999.

Ai died on 7 April 2018 in Jinan, at the age of 93.
