= Instrumentation (music) =

Particular combination of musical instruments employed in a composition

In music, instrumentation is the particular combination of musical instruments employed in a composition, and the properties of those instruments individually. Instrumentation is sometimes used as a synonym for orchestration. This juxtaposition of the two terms was first made in 1843 by Hector Berlioz in his Grand traité d'instrumentation et d'orchestration modernes, and various attempts have since been made to differentiate them. Instrumentation is a more general term referring to an orchestrator's, composer's or arranger's selection of instruments in varying combinations, or even a choice made by the performers for a particular performance, as opposed to the narrower sense of orchestration, which is the act of scoring for orchestra a work originally written for a solo instrument or smaller group of instruments.

== Instrumental properties ==
Writing for any instrument requires a composer or arranger to know the instrument's properties, such as:

- the instrument's particular timbre, or range of timbres;
- the range of pitches available on the instrument, as well as its dynamic range;
- the constraints of playing technique, such as length of breath, possible fingerings, or the average player's stamina;
- the relative difficulty of particular music on that instrument (for example, repeated notes are much easier to play on the violin than on the piano; while trills are relatively easy on the flute, but extremely difficult on the trombone);
- the availability of special effects or extended techniques, such as col legno playing, fluttertongue, or glissando;
- the notation conventions for the instrument.

== Instrumental combinations ==
Whereas "orchestration" refers to the deployment and combination of instruments in large ensembles, "instrumentation" is a wider term that also embraces the ingenuity of composers and arrangers in the handling of small ensembles. J. S. Bach experimented with a variety of instrumental groups throughout his composing life. A striking example is the band that he selected to accompany the solo bass singer in the "Quoniam" movement from his Mass in B minor.

Bach Quoniam from Mass in B minor – instrumental introduction

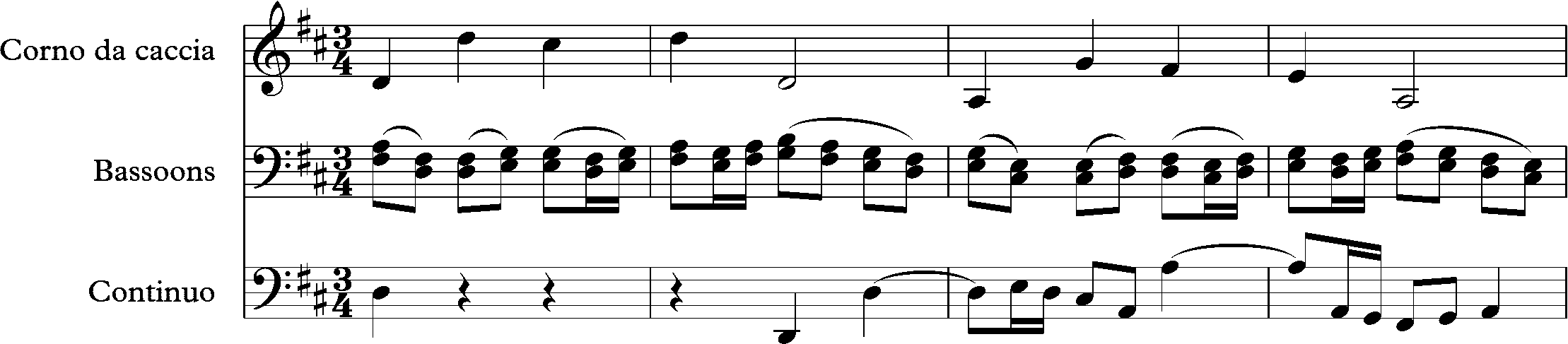
Bach Quoniam from Mass in B minor – bars 1–4

According to George Stauffer, "The 'Quoniam' is one of Bach's most extraordinary arias. The setting—bass voice, horn, two bassoons and continuo—is unique in his oeuvre. Indeed, one is hard pressed to find the combination elsewhere in the Baroque repertory."

The opening bars of Beethoven's Sonata for Violin and Piano, Op. 96 demonstrate how both contrast and blend of timbres work when composing for instruments. In bars 1-10, "the violin and piano echo one another's motifs", emphasising the contrast between their sounds. However, in the passage that follows (bars 11-20), the two instruments blend exquisitely as they "dovetail their efforts in long, soaring, arpeggiated lines in parallel motion". Here, the violin line is "sandwiched" between the two piano lines. "Collaborating, the instruments genially traverse an agreed route: they are of one mind; neither needs to develop a separate perspective, let alone to advocate a contending view of experience. Instead, external concord finds inner confirmation, with each instrument completing, ratifying, and reinforcing the other."

Beethoven Violin Sonata Op 96, first movement, bars 1-22

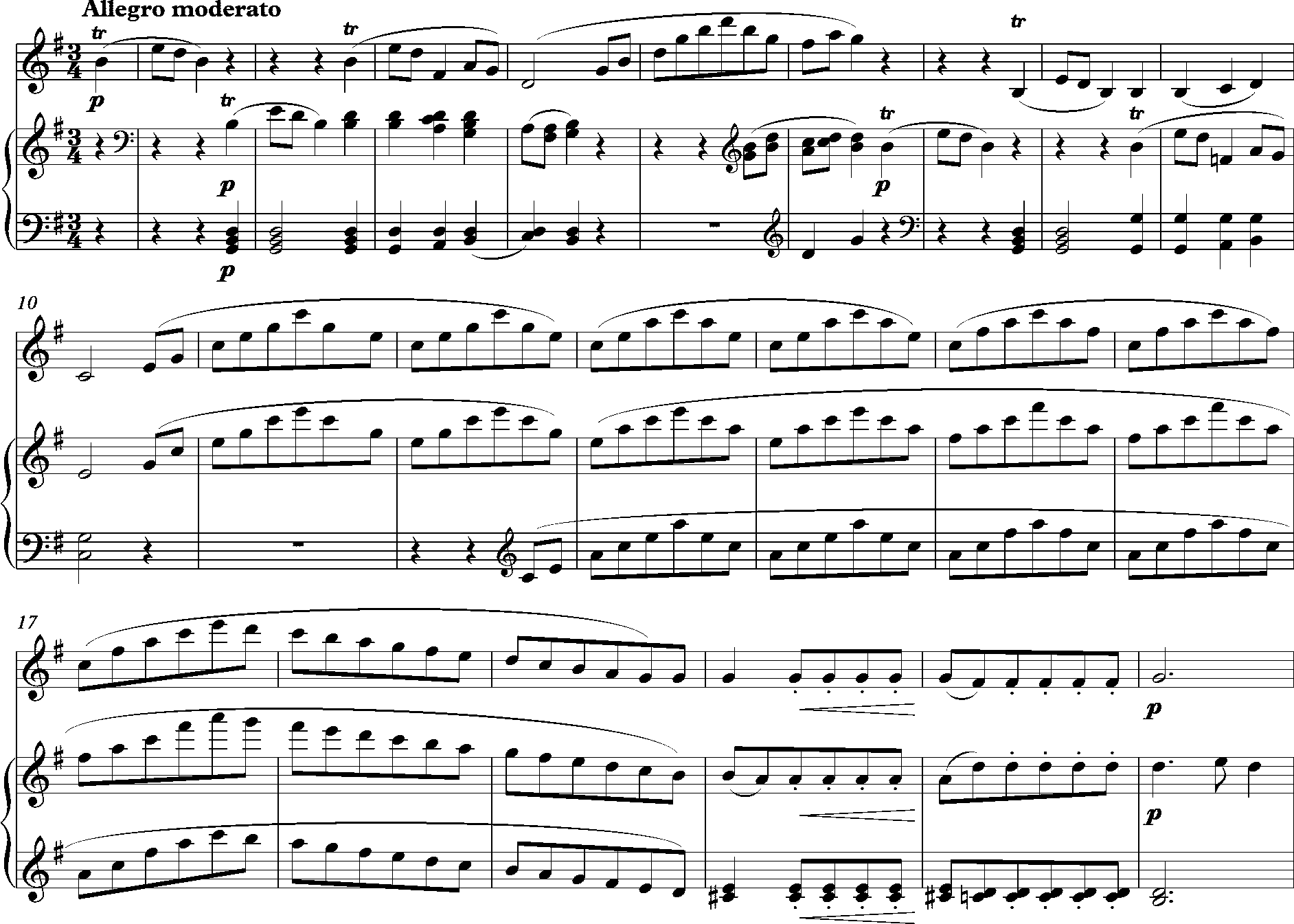
Beethoven Violin Sonata Op 96, first movement, bars 1-2

The haunting second movement of Schubert's Trio in E♭ major exemplifies the variety and interest that is possible with just three instruments. Writing of this movement Charles Rosen speaks of how Schubert "often concentrated, not on the motif, but on the space outlined by the motif, rearranging the elements within that space in different permutations." The movement opens with the main theme played on the cello with the piano providing a trudging accompaniment consisting of repeated chords:

Schubert, Trio in E♭, second movement, bars 1–6

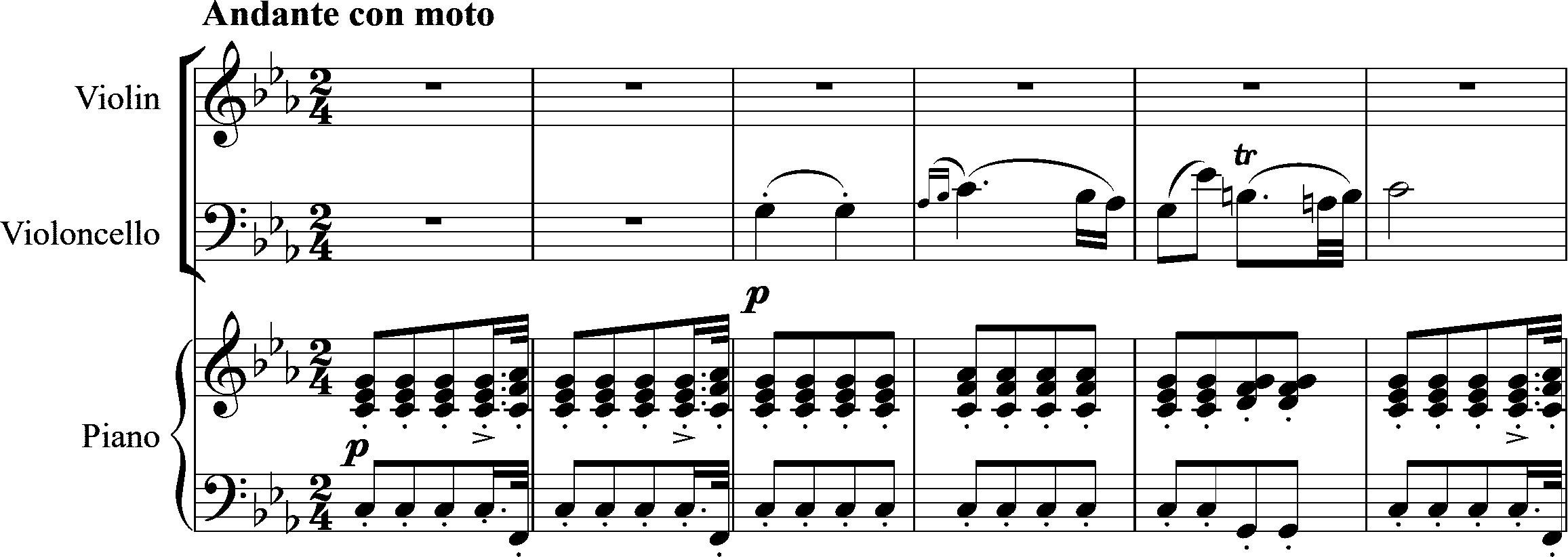
Schubert, Trio in E♭, second movement, bars 1–6.

When the theme repeats a few bars later, these roles are exchanged. The piano plays the melody in octaves, while the violin and cello play the accompaniment:

Schubert, Trio in E♭, second movement, bars 21–26

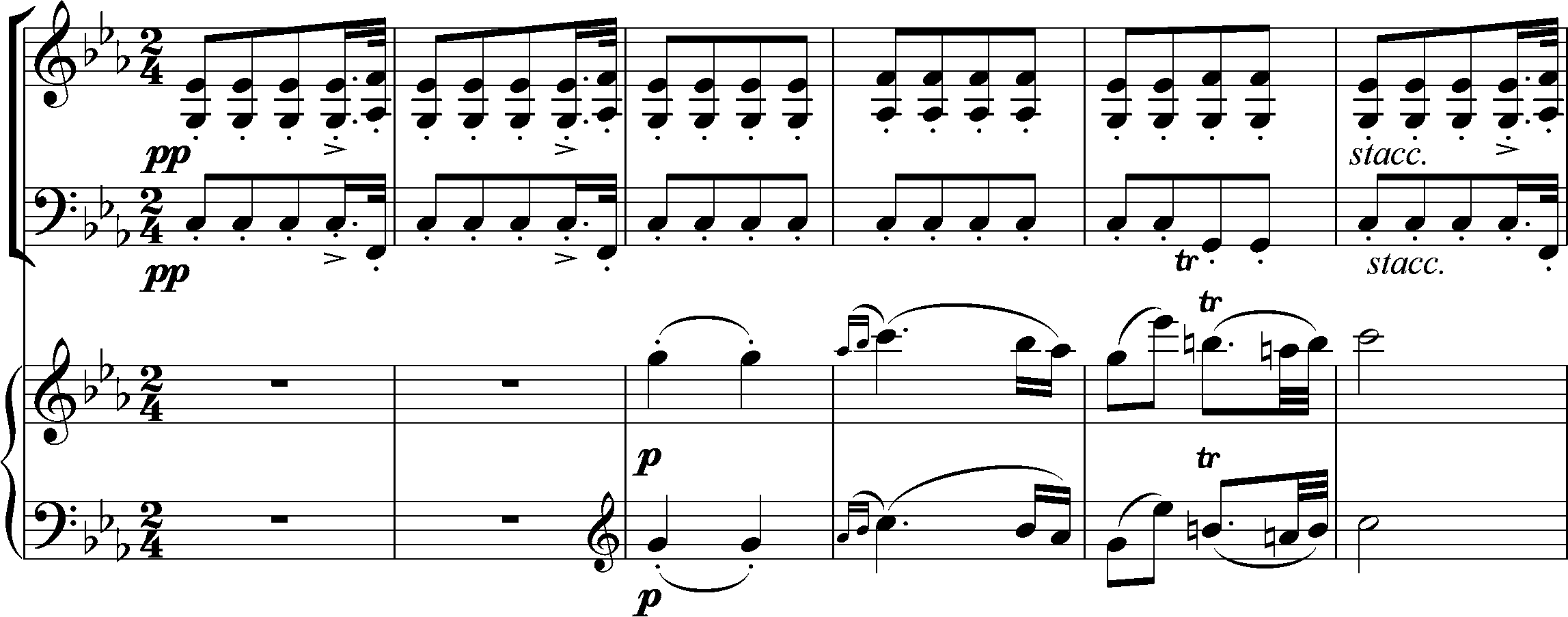
Schubert Trio in E♭, second movement, bars 21–26

Later in the movement, the piano plays both the theme in the right hand and the accompaniment in the left, leaving the violin and cello free to provide decorative countermelodies:

Schubert Trio in E♭, second movement, bars 86–89

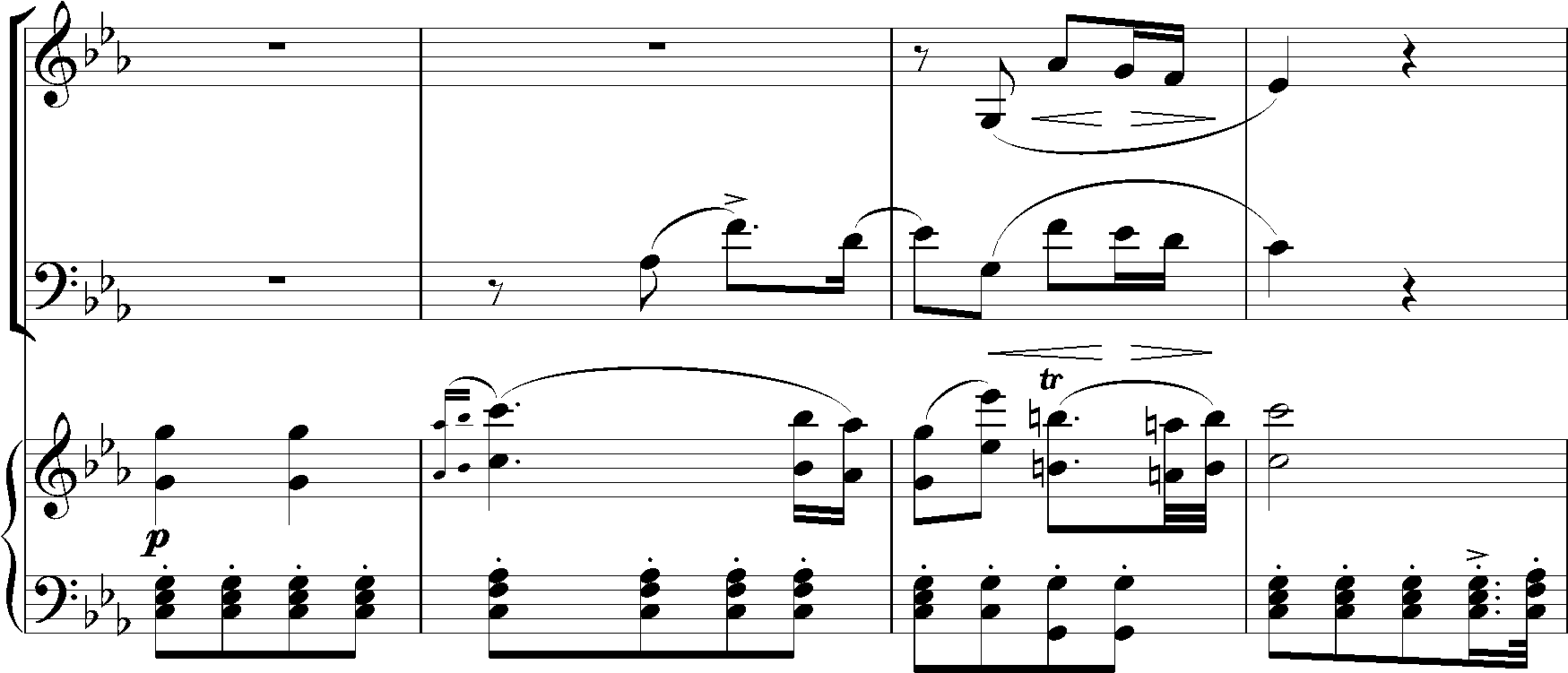
Schubert Trio in E♭, second movement, bars 86–89

The concluding bars of the movement ring the changes in instrumentation yet again, adding further ideas, such as the falling octave figure in the first and final bars, while varying and enriching the harmony and instrumental color. The strings here accompany the piano playing pizzicato, before returning to their bows for the deeply expressive final bars:

Schubert, Trio in E♭, second movement, closing bars

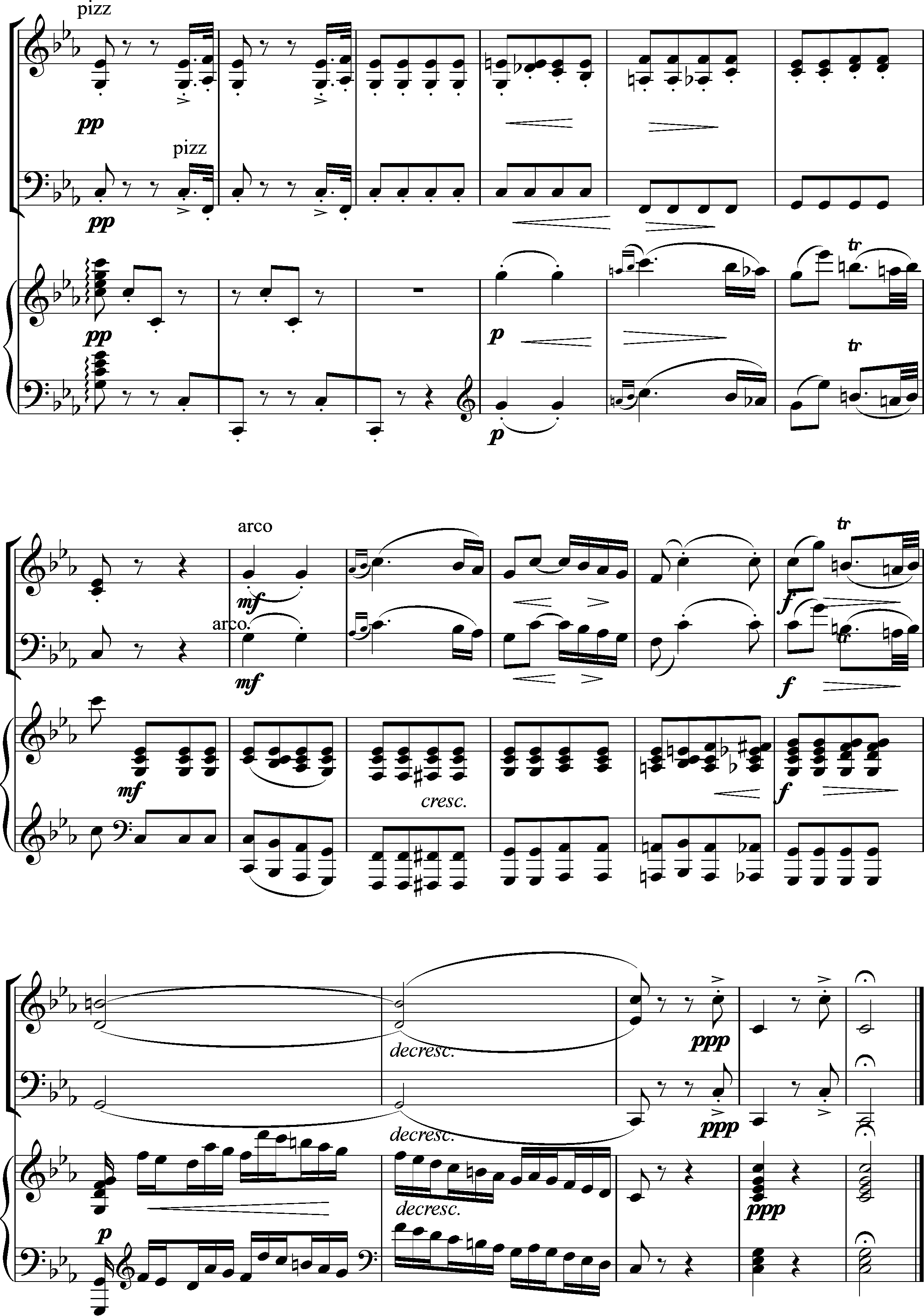
Schubert Trio in E♭, second movement, closing bars

=== Other works featuring distinctive instrumentation ===
- Rossini, Petite messe solennelle (1863): twelve singers, two pianos and harmonium;
- Saint-Saens, The Carnival of the Animals (1886): flute, clarinet, glockenspiel, xylophone, 2 violins, viola, cello, double bass and two pianos;
- Debussy, Sonata for flute, viola, and harp (1915);
- Stravinsky, The Soldier's Tale (1918): cornet, trombone, clarinet, bassoon, violin, double bass and percussion;
- Schoenberg, Herzgewächse, Op. 20: song for high voice accompanied by celesta, harmonium and harp; Serenade, Op. 24: clarinet, bass clarinet, mandolin, guitar, violin, viola and 'cello.
- Villa-Lobos, Chôros No. 4 (1926): three horns and trombone;
- Bartók, Sonata for Two Pianos and Percussion (1937);
- Messiaen, Fête des belles eaux (1937): six ondes Martenot; Quatuor pour la fin du temps (1941): clarinet, violin, cello and piano;
- Stockhausen, Kreuzspiel (1951): oboe, bass clarinet, piano and four percussionists;
- Cage, Imaginary Landscape No. 4 (March No. 2) (1951): 12 radios, 24 players;
- Boulez, Le Marteau sans maître (1955): alto flute, viola, vibraphone, xylorimba, guitar and percussion; Sur Incises (1996–98): three pianos, three harps, and three percussionists;
- Goeyvaerts, De Zang van Aquarius (The Song of Aquarius, 1984): eight bass clarinets.

== See also ==
- Concert band
- Brass section
- Keyboard section
- Percussion section
- String section
- Woodwind section
- Shorthand for orchestra instrumentation
- Hornbostel–Sachs instrument classification system

== Bibliography ==
- Kreitner, Kenneth; Térey-Smith, Mary; Westrup, Jack A.; Holoman, D. Kern; Hopkins, George W.; Griffiths, Paul A.; Conrad, Jon Alan (2001). "Instrumentation and orchestration". In Sadie, Stanley J.; Tyrrell, John (eds.). The New Grove Dictionary of Music and Musicians (2nd ed.). Oxford University Press. doi:10.1093/gmo/9781561592630.article.20404. ISBN 1-56159-239-0.
- Rosen, Charles W. (1997). "Schubert's inflections of Classical form". In Gibbs, Christopher H. (ed.). The Cambridge companion to Schubert. Cambridge, UK: Cambridge University Press. pp. 72–98. doi:10.1017/CCOL9780521482295.006. ISBN 9781139002172.
- Solomon, Maynard E. (2003). Late Beethoven: music, thought, imagination. Berkeley, CA: University of California Press. ISBN 9780520243392.
- Stauffer, George B. (2003). Bach, the Mass in B minor: the great Catholic Mass. Yale Music Masterworks. New Haven, CT: Yale University Press. ISBN 9780300099669.
