= 2018 in European music =

2018 in continental European music in geographical order.

== Events ==
- 1 January – Barbara Laister-Ebner becomes the first female zither player to appear at the Vienna New Year's Concert.
- 8 January – Arts Council England announces the appointment of its new Director of Music, Claire Mera-Nelson.
- 10 January – The UK's Royal Philharmonic Orchestra announces the resignation of Charles Dutoit as its principal conductor, a year before the end of his contract, following allegations of inappropriate behaviour.
- 29 January – The Vienna Radio Symphony Orchestra announces that Marin Alsop will be its next chief conductor - the first woman to hold the position.
- January – Portuguese Eurovision-winning singer Salvador Sobral leaves hospital after undergoing a successful heart transplant operation.
- 21 February – The Orchestre Philharmonique de Liège announces that Gergely Madaras will be its next music director.
- 6 March – The Bavarian State Opera announces that Serge Dorny will be its next Intendant, and Vladimir Jurowski its next Generalmusikdirektor; both appointments will begin with the 2021-2022 season.
- 12 May – The Eurovision Song Contest 2018 takes place in Lisbon, Portugal. The 2017 winner, Salvador Sobral, and Brazilian singer and composer Caetano Veloso appear together for the first time to provide entertainment during the grand final. The contest is won by Israel, represented by Netta, with the song "Toy".
- 21-24 June – European Music Day is celebrated.

== Scandinavia ==
- Main article for Scandinavian music in 2018

=== Top hits ===
- Danish #1s
- Finnish #1 singles 2018, Finnish #1 albums
- Norway charts
- Swedish #1 singles and albums

== Netherlands ==
- Dutch #1 singles

== Ireland ==
- Main article for Irish music in 2018

== UK ==
- Main article for British music in 2018

== Germany ==
- German number ones

== Switzerland and Austria ==
- Swiss #1s

== France ==
- French #1s

== Italy ==
- Italian number ones

== Eastern Europe/ Balkans ==
- List of Polish #1 singles
- Czech #1 singles
- Hungarian #1 singles

== Musical films ==
- La Tribu (Spain) starring Paco León, Carmen Machi, María José Sarrate
- Lyod (Russia)
- Ted: För kärlekens skull (Sweden)

== Deaths ==
- 1 January – Teddy Edelmann, 76, Danish singer
- 7 January – France Gall, 70, French singer, Eurovision winner (1965)
- 15 January – Dolores O'Riordan, 46, Irish singer and musician
- 16 January – Madalena Iglésias, 78, Portuguese actress and singer
- 18 January – Javiera Muñoz, 40, Swedish singer
- 20 January – Mario Guccio, 64, Belgian singer (Machiavel)
- 24 January
  - Renaud Gagneux, 70, French composer
  - Mark E. Smith, 60, English singer and songwriter (The Fall)
- 27 January – David Zard, 75, Italian record producer
- 28 January
  - Neil Harris, 63, British musician (Sham 69; cancer).
  - Coco Schumann, 93, German jazz musician
- 29 January – Asmund Bjørken, 84, Norwegian jazz musician
- 5 February – Zeno Roth, 61, German guitarist and songwriter
- 12 February – László Melis, 64, Hungarian composer and violinist
- 15 February – Tamara Nizhnikova, 92, Belarusian singer
- 18 February – Didier Lockwood, 62, French jazz violinist (heart attack)
- 26 March – Nikolay Kaufman, 92, Bulgarian musicologist, folklorist and composer.
- 20 April – Avicii, 28, Swedish musician, DJ, remixer and record producer.
- 30 April – Rose Laurens, 65, French singer-songwriter
- 2 May – Herman Krebbers, 94, Dutch violinist
- 7 May – Roman Toi, 101, Estonian-Canadian composer, choir conductor, and organist
- 29 May – Jürgen Marcus, 69, German singer (COPD) (death announced on this date)
- 4 June – Marc Ogeret, 86, French singer
- 8 June – Stefan Weber, 71, Austrian singer
- 12 June
  - Helena Dunicz-Niwińska, 102, Polish violinist, translator and author
  - Jon Hiseman, 73, English drummer (brain cancer)
  - Jarosław Kozidrak, 63, Polish guitarist, keyboardist and composer
- 26 June
  - Fedor Frešo, 71, Slovak rock and jazz bassist
  - Bo Nilsson, 81, Swedish composer
- 5 July – François Budet, 78, French singer-songwriter
- 6 July – Vlatko Ilievski, 33, Macedonian pop singer and actor
- 29 July – Oliver Dragojević, 70, Croatian singer (lung cancer)
- 1 August – Celeste Rodrigues, 95, Portuguese fado singer
- 7 August – Dumitru Fărcaș, 80, Romanian tárogató player.
- 17 August – Claudio Lolli, 68, Italian singer-songwriter (cancer)
- 26 August – Inge Borkh, 97, German soprano
- 4 September – Elisa Serna, 75, Spanish protest singer-songwriter.
- 6 September – Philippe Eidel, 61, French music producer, writer and film composer
- 9 September – Beat Richner, 71, Swiss pediatrician and cellist
- 12 September – Erich Kleinschuster, 88, Austrian trombonist and bandleader
- 1 October
  - Charles Aznavour, 94, French-Armenian singer and lyricist
  - Stelvio Cipriani, 81, Italian composer, complications from a stroke.
- 26 October – Darijan Božič, 85, Slovenian composer (death announced on this date)
- 3 November – Maria Guinot, 73, Portuguese singer=
- 4 November – Roman Grinev, 41, Russian jazz bassist
- 7 November – Mícheál Ó Súilleabháin, 67, Irish musician and composer
- 26 November
  - Umberto Borsò, 95, Italian opera singer
  - Stanislav Gorkovenko, 80, Russian conductor
- 29 November – Ulrich Leyendecker, 72, German composer.
