= Pan and Echo =

Dance intermezzo by Jean Sibelius

- Dance intermezzo by Jean Sibelius
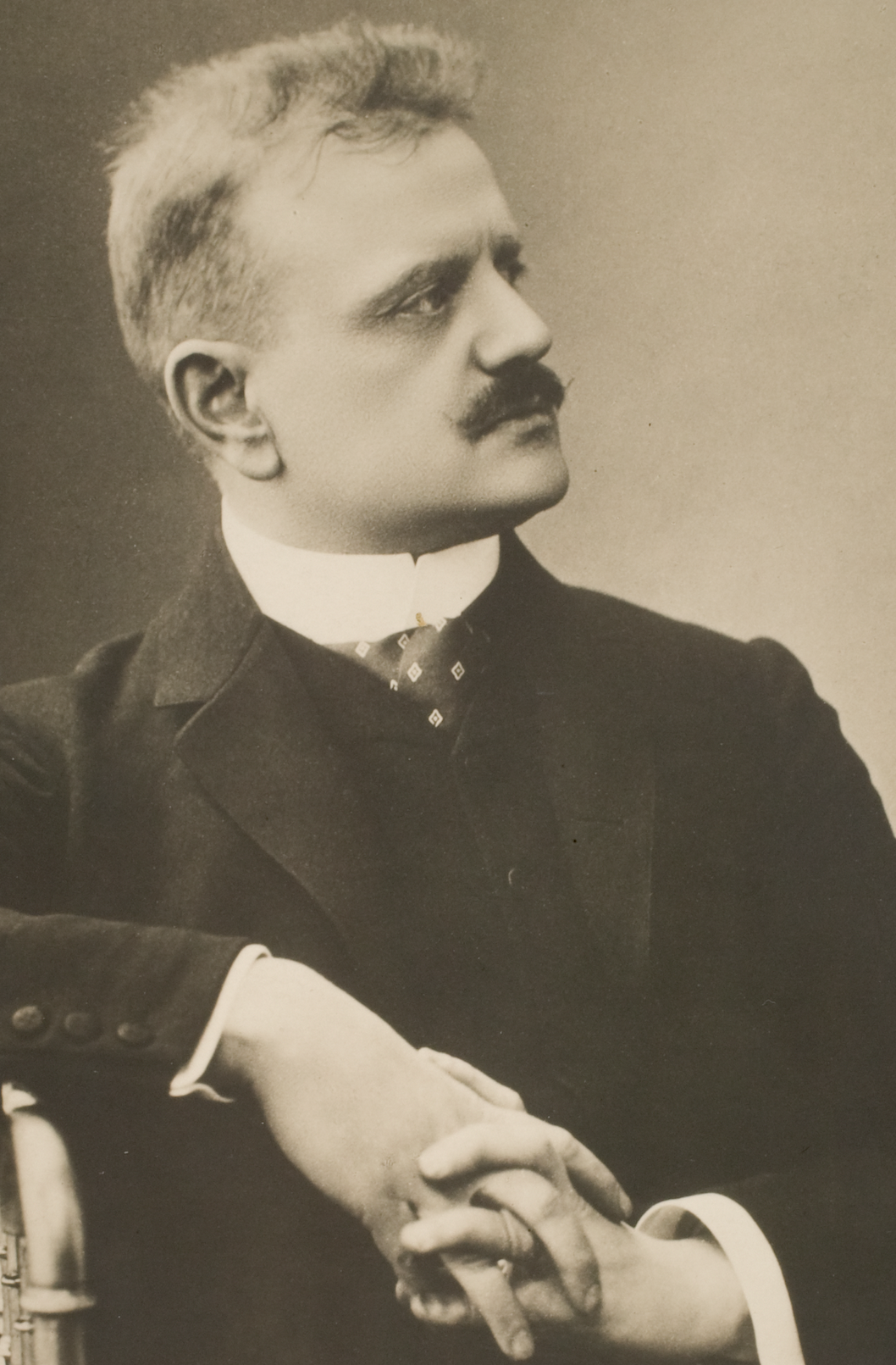
- The composer (c. 1905)
- Native name: Pan och Echo
- Opus: 53
- Composed: 1906
- Publisher: Lienau (1907)
- Duration: 4.5 mins.

Premiere
- Date: 24 March 1906
- Location: Helsinki, Grand Duchy of Finland
- Conductor: Jean Sibelius
- Performers: Helsinki Philharmonic Society

Pan and Echo (in Swedish Pan och Echo; in Finnish: Pan ja Kaiku; subtitled "Dance intermezzo No. 3"), Op. 53, (Note: Pan and Echo was published as Sibelius's Op. 53a. However, no work in his oeuvre retains the 'Op. 53b' designation.) is tableau music for orchestra written in early 1906 by the Finnish composer by Jean Sibelius. The piece premiered in Helsinki on 24 March 1906, with Sibelius conducting the Helsinki Philharmonic Society; the venue was the original location of the Hotelli Seurahuone (Helsinki City Hall since 1913).

Though brief, Pan and Echo is, according to Sibelius's biographer Andrew Barnett, "poetic, full of feeling, and scored with great sensitivity".

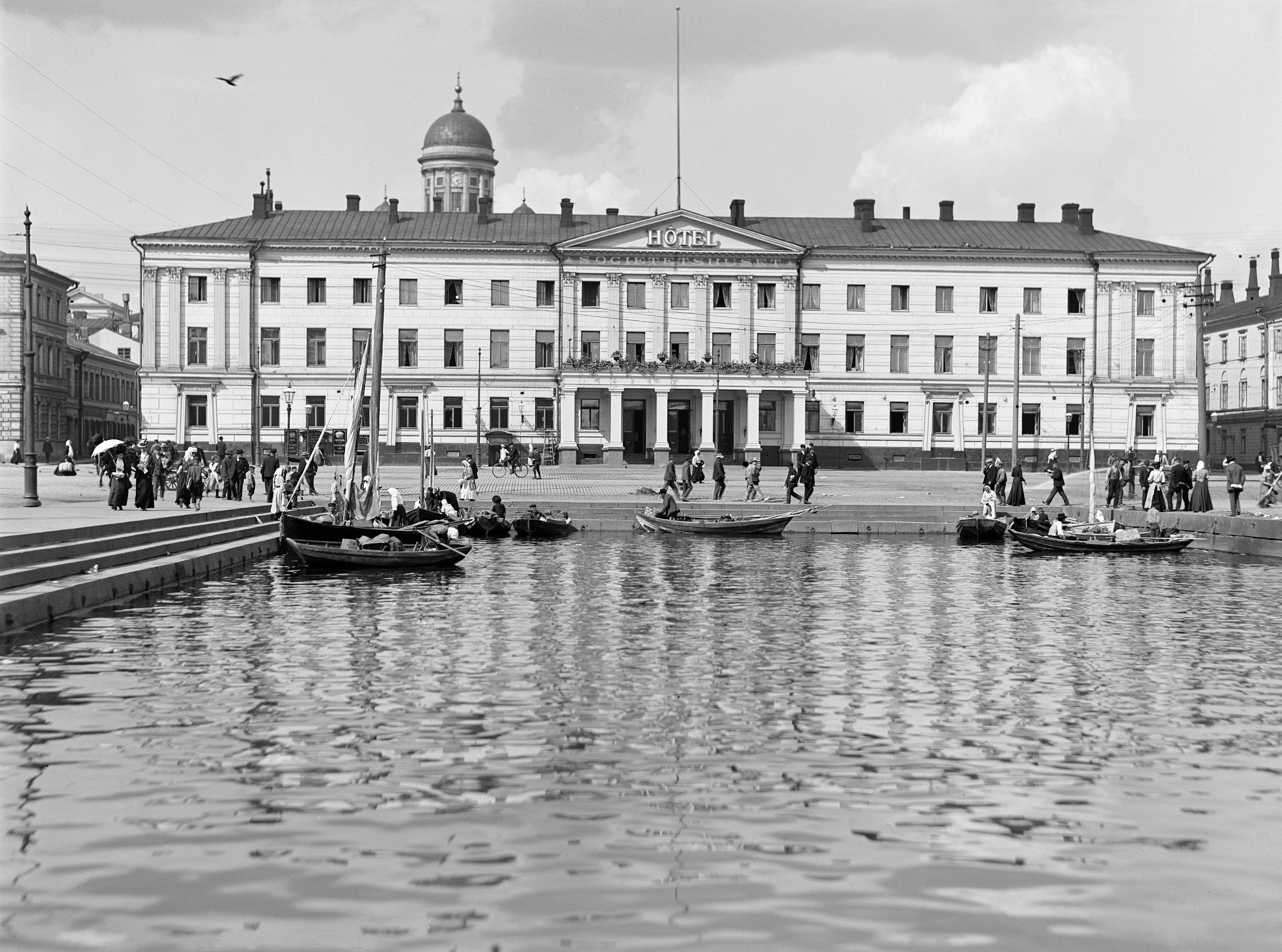
Sibelius's Pan and Echo premiered during a lottery evening at the Hotelli Seurahuone on 24 March 1906.

== Instrumentation ==
Pan and Echo is scored for the following instruments, organized by family (woodwinds, brass, percussion, and strings):

- 2 flutes (one doubling piccolo), 2 oboes, 2 clarinets (in B♭), and 2 bassoons
- 4 horns (in F), 2 trumpets (in F), and 3 trombones
- Timpani, bass drum, cymbals, and triangle
- Violins (I and II), violas, cellos, and double basses

== Discography ==
The Finnish conductor Martti Similä and the Finlandia Orchestra made the world premiere studio recording of Pan and Echo c. 1956 for Fennica. The table below lists this and other commercially available recordings:

No.	Conductor	Ensemble	Rec. (Note: Refers to the year in which the performers recorded the work; this may not be the same as the year in which the recording was first released to the general public.)	Time	Recording venue	Label	Ref.
1	Martti Similä	Finlandia Orchestra	c. 1956	?	?	Fennica	(Note: [ M. Similä–Fennica (SS 1) 1968])
2	Sir Charles Groves	Royal Liverpool Philharmonic Orchestra	1975	4:27	Philharmonic Hall, Liverpool	EMI Classics	(Note: C. Groves–EMI Classics (85532) 2004)
3	Neemi Järvi	Gothenburg Symphony Orchestra	1986	4:33	Gothenburg Concert Hall	BIS	(Note: N. Järvi–BIS (CD–359) 1987)
4	Stanislav Gorkovenko	Saint Petersburg Radio and TV Orchestra	?	4:21	?	Elap	(Note: S. Gorkovenko–Elap (44183CD) 1998)
5	Shuntaro Sato	Kuopio Symphony Orchestra	2002	4:29	Kuopio Music Centre	Finlandia	(Note: S. Sato–Finlandia (0927–49598–2) 2003)
6	Osmo Vänskä	Lahti Symphony Orchestra	2004	4:07	Sibelius Hall	BIS	(Note: O. Vänskä–BIS (CD–1565) 2006)
7	Pietari Inkinen	New Zealand Symphony Orchestra	2007	4:51	Michael Fowler Centre	Naxos	(Note: P. Inkinen–Naxos (8.570763) 2008)

== Notes, references, and sources ==
Notes

Sources

- Barnett, Andrew (2007). Sibelius. New Haven: Yale University Press. ISBN 978-0-300-11159-0.
- Dahlström, Fabian [in Swedish] (2003). Jean Sibelius: Thematisch-bibliographisches Verzeichnis seiner Werke [Jean Sibelius: A Thematic Bibliographic Index of His Works] (in German). Wiesbaden: Breitkopf & Härtel. ISBN 3-7651-0333-0.

== Also see ==
- Pan (god)
- Echo (mythology)
