= Borso =

Borso or Borsò may refer to:

== Given name ==
- Borso d'Este, Duke of Ferrara (1413–1471), Italian duke, first Duke of Modena, commissioned the Borso d'Este Bible
- Borso da Correggio (died 1503), condottiero
- Borso d'Este (1605–1657)

== Surname ==
- János Borsó (b. 1953), Hungarian footballer
- Umberto Borsò (1923–2018), Italian operatic tenor

== Places ==
- Borso del Grappa, municipality in Treviso, Italy

== See also ==
- Borsos
