= Grinev =

Grinev (Гринев, Гринёв) is a Russian surname. Notable people with the surname include:

- Leonid Grinev (1882–?), Russian fencer
- Roman Grinev (1976–2018), Russian musician
- Vladislav Grinev (born 1996), Russian swimmer
