= Gustav Mahler's orchestration of Beethoven's Symphony No. 9 =

Mahler's orchestratrion of Beethoven's Symphony No. 9

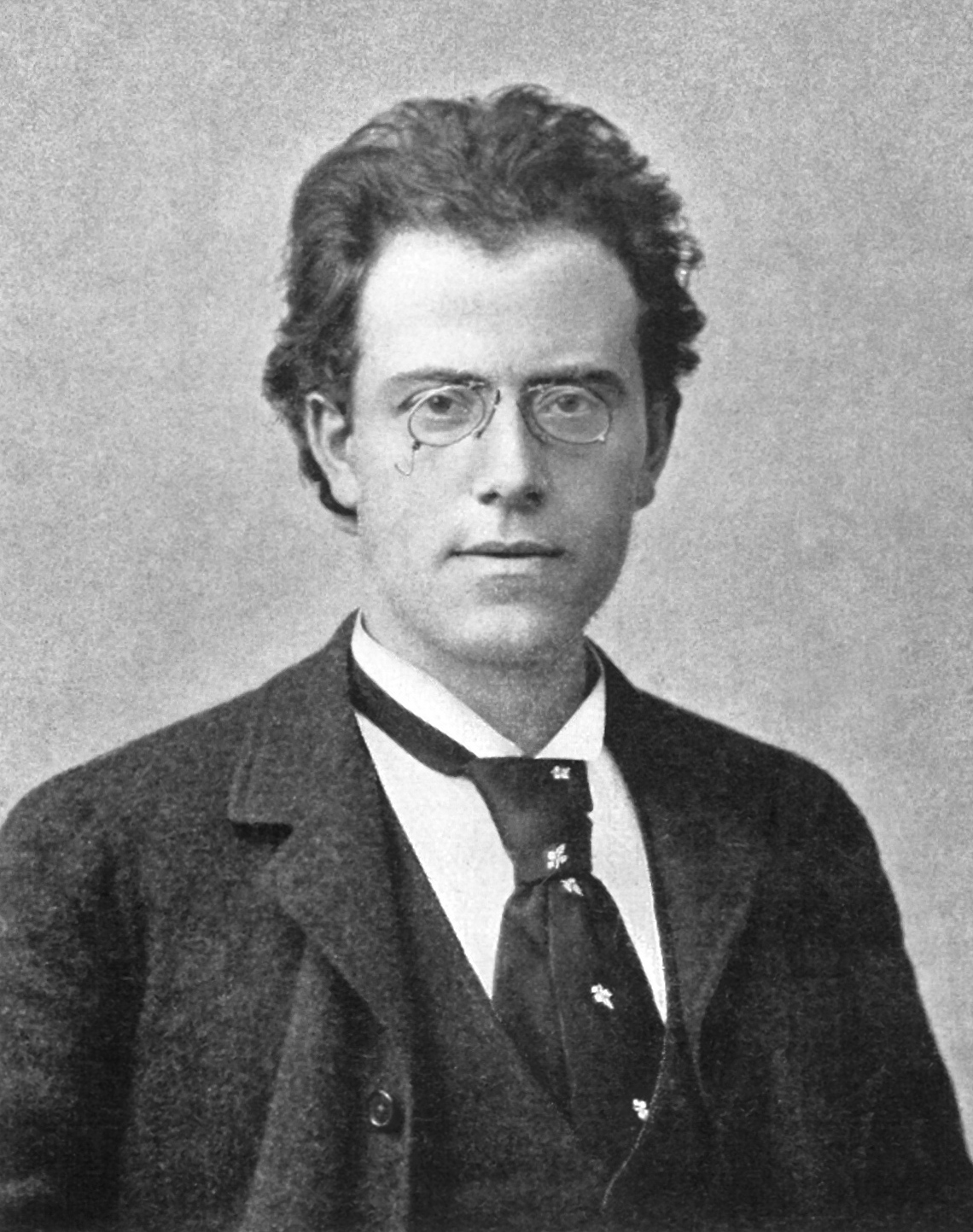
Mahler in 1892

Gustav Mahler's orchestration of Beethoven's Ninth Symphony was a decades-long project to modernize the symphony through the incorporation of modern instruments and techniques. Mahler's orchestration of the Ninth remains controversial and its critical reception has been mixed.

== Background ==
By the mid-nineteenth century questions regarding the orchestration of Beethoven's work attracted the attention of major composers. Richard Wagner addressed Beethoven's Ninth Symphony in two key texts, Zu Beethoven's Neunter Symphonie in 1846 and Zum Vortrag der neunten Symphonie Beethovens, 1873. Wagner's alterations were based on two premises: Beethoven's deafness and the technical development and capabilities of newer instruments. Wagner proposed changes in orchestration, including re-writing some sections, modification of dynamics, and changes to some horn sections to allow for the fuller range of notes available to newer instruments. George Grove and Felix Weingartner also discussed the orchestration of the Ninth Symphony, including Wagner's, at length. Grove was critical of Wagner's modifications: "Make the same proposition in regard to a picture or poem and its inadmissibility is at once obvious to anyone." This is similar to the French composer Charles Gounod's argument that "it is better to leave a great master his imperfections, if he has any, than to impose on him our own." In contrast, Mahler argued that editing was necessary in performances of Beethoven's works. His changes were numerous. "Hardly a page of score is left without some change," notes the scholar David Pickett.

Mahler first performed Beethoven's Ninth in 1886 in Prague, which he reportedly conducted from memory. He presented his first orchestration of the Ninth in an 1895 concert in Hamburg.

== Orchestration and instrumentation ==
Mahler's orchestration was a substantial change to the instrumentation of Beethoven's original score. Most notable is the addition of four horns and a tuba (which did not exist when Beethoven wrote the symphony). Shorthand for orchestra instrumentation for Mahler's re-orchestration compared to Beethoven's original (reproduced from McCaldin):

Beethoven	3*.2.2.3*.	4.2.3.0	T.3P.	Strings
Mahler	4*.4.4.4.	8.4.3.1.	2T.3P.	Strings

Perhaps most controversially, Mahler deleted several parts for horns and woodwinds, and altered the tessitura of string parts.

== Performances in Vienna and Mahler's response to critics ==
Mahler conducted his version of the Ninth as head of the Vienna Philharmonic on February 18, 1900. Critics savaged the orchestration, one calling it "scarcely recognizable" and a "forgery". Mahler was so taken aback by these criticisms that he decided to issue an explanatory note and conducted a repeat performance on February 22, 1900. Mahler's response to critics stressed that he had proceeded carefully, noted that he was not the first conductor to make changes to the Ninth, and stated that he had a "veneration" for Beethoven. K.M. Knittel suggests that pervasive antisemitism in fin-de-siècle Vienna offers the best explanation for critics' reactions.

== New York performances ==
Mahler conducted his version of the Ninth in New York City in April 1909 and again in April 1910. The orchestration provoked less criticism in New York than it had in Vienna.
