= Op. 53 =

In music, Op. 53 stands for Opus number 53. Compositions that are assigned this number include:

- Beethoven – Piano Sonata No. 21
- Brahms – Alto Rhapsody
- Britten – Gloriana
- Chopin – Polonaise in A-flat major, Op. 53
- Dvořák – Violin Concerto
- Mendelssohn – Songs Without Words Book 4
- Prokofiev – Piano Concerto No. 4
- Schubert – Piano Sonata in D major, D 850
- Schumann – Romanzen & Balladen volume III (3 songs)
- Scriabin – Piano Sonata No. 5
- Sibelius – Pan and Echo (Pan och Echo), dance intermezzo for orchestra (1907)
- Strauss – Symphonia Domestica
- Szymanowski – Stabat Mater
- Tchaikovsky – Orchestral Suite No. 2
