= Orchestra =

Large instrumental ensemble

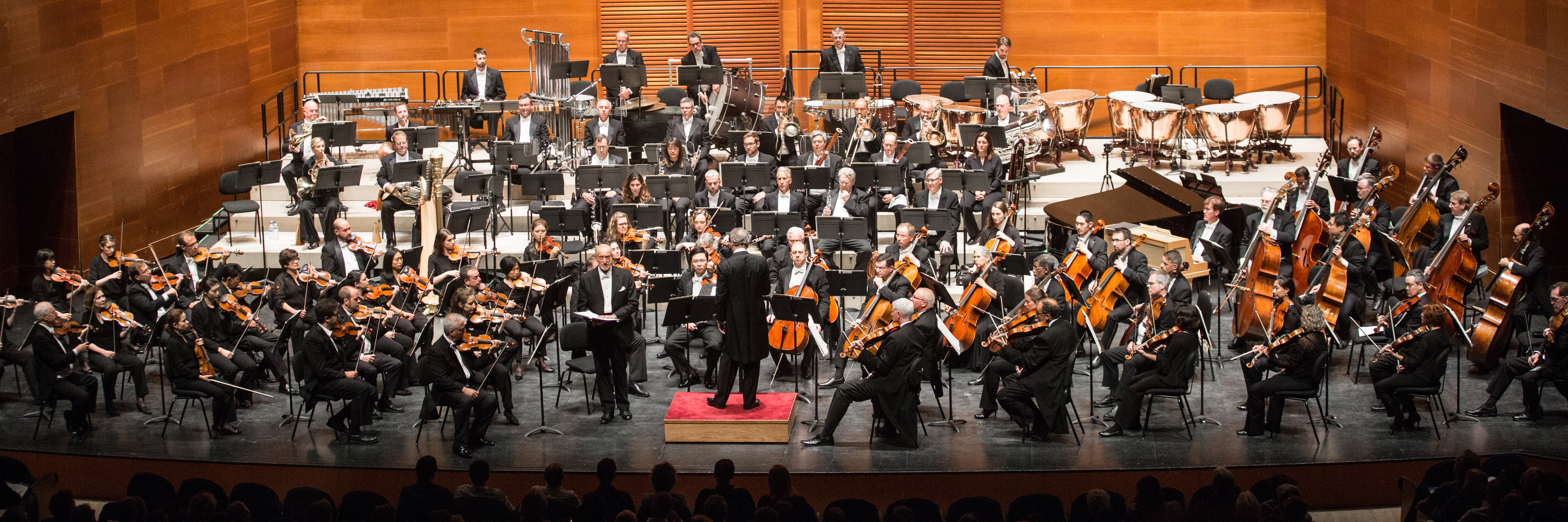
Cincinnati Symphony Orchestra

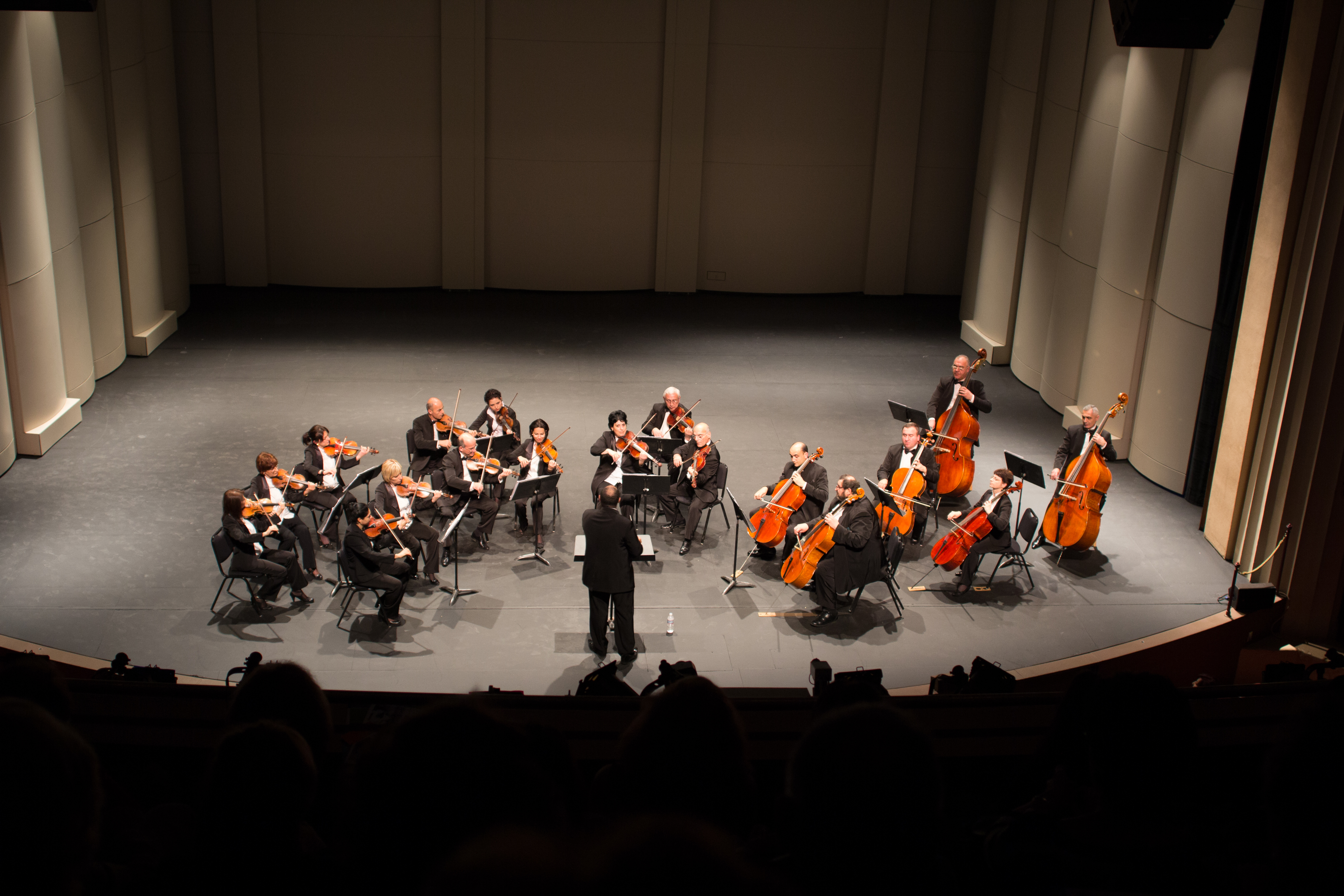
National Chamber Orchestra of Armenia

An orchestra (/ˈɔːrkɪstrə/; OR-ki-strə) is a large instrumental ensemble typical of classical music or jazz, which combines instruments from different families. There are typically four main sections of instruments:

- The string section, including the violin, viola, cello, and double bass
- The woodwind section, including the flute, oboe, clarinet, and bassoon, and sometimes piccolo, cor anglais, bass clarinet, contrabassoon, and saxophone
- The brass section, including the French horn (commonly known as the "horn"), trumpet, trombone, and tuba, and sometimes cornet and euphonium
- The percussion section, including the timpani, snare drum, bass drum, cymbals, triangle, tambourine, tam-tam and mallet percussion instruments

The harp is fairly regularly included in modern orchestras, especially for romantic period music. Keyboard instruments such as the piano, harpsichord, pipe organ, free-bass accordion and celesta may sometimes appear in a fifth keyboard section or may stand alone as soloist instruments. For performances of some modern compositions, electronic instruments and guitars may also be included. (Note: Because of their hammer action, the piano and celesta are often included in the percussion instruments ("pitched percussion"); the harp, harpsichord, and guitar in the string section; and the pipe organ in the woodwinds. The harp is the only instrument which is (fairly) regularly included in modern orchestras, at least for romantic period music. The piano is regularly a part of pops orchestras, and the harpsichord is regularly included in baroque chamber orchestras.)

A full-size Western orchestra may sometimes be called a symphony orchestra or philharmonic orchestra (from Greek phil-, "loving", and "harmony"). The number of musicians employed in a given performance may vary from seventy to over one hundred, depending on the work being played and the venue size. A chamber orchestra (sometimes a concert orchestra) is a smaller ensemble of not more than around fifty musicians. Orchestras that specialize in the Baroque music of, for example, Johann Sebastian Bach and George Frideric Handel, or Classical repertoire, such as that of Haydn and Mozart, tend to be smaller than orchestras performing a Romantic music repertoire such as the symphonies of Ludwig van Beethoven and Johannes Brahms. The typical orchestra grew in size throughout the 18th and 19th centuries, reaching a peak with the large orchestras of as many as 120 players called for in the works of Richard Wagner and later Gustav Mahler.

Orchestras are usually led by a conductor who directs the performance with movements of the hands and arms, often made easier for the musicians to see by using a short wooden rod known as a conductor's baton. The conductor unifies the orchestra, sets the tempo, and shapes the sound of the ensemble. The conductor also prepares the orchestra by leading rehearsals before the public concert, in which the conductor provides instructions to the musicians on their interpretation of the music being performed.

The principal player of the first violin section – commonly called the concertmaster (or 'leader', in UK parlance) – also plays an important role in leading the musicians. In the Baroque music era (1600–1750), orchestras were often led by the concertmaster, or by a chord-playing musician performing the basso continuo parts on a harpsichord or pipe organ, a tradition that some 20th-century and 21st-century early music ensembles continue.

Orchestras play a wide range of repertoire, including symphonies, opera and ballet overtures, concertos for solo instruments, and pit ensembles for operas, ballets, and some types of musical theatre (e.g., Gilbert and Sullivan operettas).

Amateur orchestras include youth orchestras made up of students from an elementary school, a high school, or a university, and community orchestras; typically they are made up of amateur musicians from a particular city or region.

The term orchestra derives from the Greek ὀρχήστρα (orchestra), the name for the area in front of a stage in ancient Greek theatre reserved for the Greek chorus.

== History ==
=== Baroque and classical eras ===
In the Baroque era, the size and composition of an orchestra were not standardised. There were large differences in size, instrumentation and playing styles—and therefore in orchestral soundscapes and palettes — between the various European regions. The Baroque orchestra ranged from smaller orchestras (or ensembles) with one player per part, to larger-scale orchestras with many players per part. Examples of the smaller variety were Bach's orchestras, for example in Koethen, where he had access to an ensemble of up to 18 players. Examples of large-scale Baroque orchestras would include Corelli's orchestra in Rome which ranged between 35 and 80 players for day-to-day performances, being enlarged to 150 players for special occasions.

In the classical era, the orchestra became more standardized with a small to medium-sized string section and a core wind section consisting of pairs of oboes, flutes, bassoons and horns, sometimes supplemented by percussion and pairs of clarinets and trumpets.

=== Beethoven's influence ===
The so-called "standard complement" of doubled winds and brass in the orchestra pioneered in the late 18th century and consolidated during the first half of the 19th century is generally attributed to the forces called for by Beethoven after Haydn and Mozart. Beethoven's instrumentation almost always included paired flutes, oboes, clarinets, bassoons, horns and trumpets. The exceptions are his Symphony No. 4, Violin Concerto, and Piano Concerto No. 4, which each specify a single flute. Beethoven carefully calculated the expansion of this particular timbral "palette" in Symphonies 3, 5, 6, and 9 for an innovative effect. The third horn in the "Eroica" Symphony arrives to provide not only some harmonic flexibility but also the effect of "choral" brass in the Trio movement. Piccolo, contrabassoon, and trombones add to the triumphal finale of his Symphony No. 5. A piccolo and a pair of trombones help deliver the effect of storm and sunshine in the Sixth, also known as the Pastoral Symphony. The Ninth asks for a second pair of horns, for reasons similar to the "Eroica" (four horns has since become standard); Beethoven's use of piccolo, contrabassoon, trombones, and untuned percussion—plus chorus and vocal soloists—in his finale, are his earliest suggestion that the timbral boundaries of the symphony might be expanded. For several decades after his death, symphonic instrumentation was faithful to Beethoven's well-established model, with few exceptions.

=== Instrumental technology ===
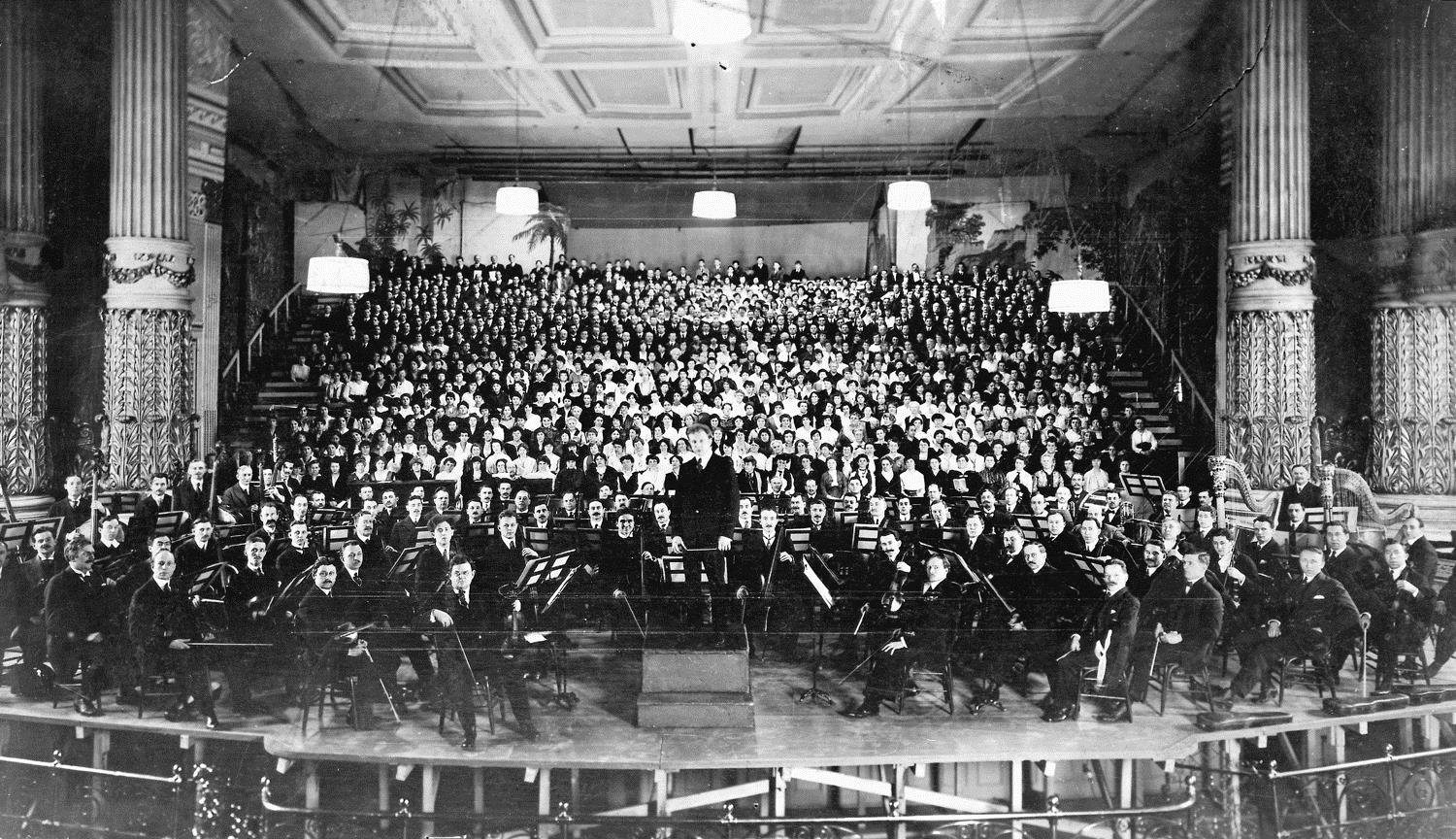
Stokowski and the Philadelphia Orchestra at the 2 March 1916 American premiere of Mahler's 8th Symphony

The invention of the piston and rotary valve for brass instruments by Heinrich Stölzel and Friedrich Blühmel, both Silesians, in 1815, was the first in a series of innovations which impacted the orchestra, including the development of modern keywork for the flute by Theobald Boehm and the innovations of Adolphe Sax in the woodwinds, notably the invention of the saxophone. These advances would lead Hector Berlioz to write a landmark book on instrumentation, which was the first systematic treatise on using instrumental sound as an expressive element of music.

=== Wagner's influence ===
The next major expansion of symphonic practice came from Richard Wagner's Bayreuth orchestra, founded to accompany his musical dramas. Wagner's works for the stage were scored with unprecedented scope and complexity: indeed, his score to Das Rheingold calls for six harps. Thus, Wagner envisioned an ever-more-demanding role for the conductor of the theatre orchestra, as he elaborated in his influential work On Conducting. This brought about a revolution in orchestral composition and set the style for orchestral performance for the next eighty years. Wagner's theories re-examined the importance of tempo, dynamics, bowing of string instruments and the role of principals in the orchestra.

=== 20th-century orchestra ===
At the beginning of the 20th century, symphony orchestras were larger, better funded, and better trained than previously; consequently, composers could compose larger and more ambitious works. The works of Gustav Mahler were particularly innovative; in his later symphonies, such as the mammoth Symphony No. 8, Mahler pushes the furthest boundaries of orchestral size, employing large forces. By the late Romantic era, orchestras could support the most enormous forms of symphonic expression, with huge string and brass sections and an expanded range of percussion instruments. With the recording era beginning, the standards of performance were pushed to a new level, because a recorded symphony could be listened to closely and even minor errors in intonation or ensemble, which might not be noticeable in a live performance, could be heard by critics. As recording technologies improved over the 20th and 21st centuries, eventually small errors in a recording could be "fixed" by audio editing or overdubbing. Some older conductors and composers could remember a time when simply "getting through" the music as well as possible was the standard. Combined with the wider audience made possible by recording, this led to a renewed focus on particular star conductors and on a high standard of orchestral execution.

== Instrumentation ==
Viotti Chamber Orchestra performing the 3rd movement of Mozart's Divertimento in D major, K. 136

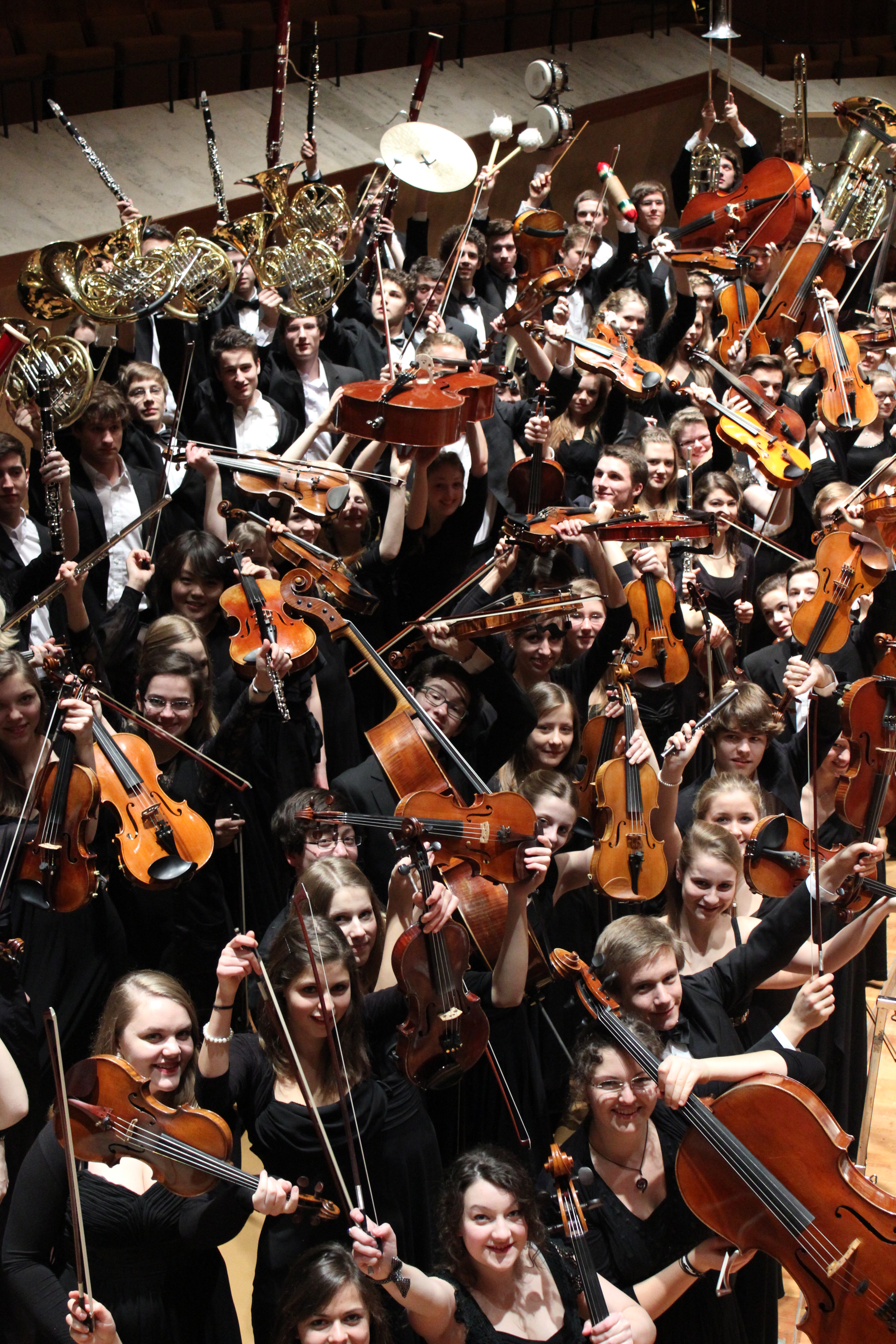
Group photo of Bundesjugendorchester, 2012

The typical symphony orchestra consists of four groups of related musical instruments called the woodwinds, brass, percussion, and strings. Other instruments such as the piano, accordion, and celesta may sometimes be grouped into a fifth section such as a keyboard section or may stand alone, as may the concert harp and electric and electronic instruments. The orchestra, depending on the size, contains almost all of the standard instruments in each group.

In the history of the orchestra, its instrumentation has been expanded over time, often agreed to have been standardized by the classical period and Ludwig van Beethoven's influence on the classical model. In the 20th and 21st century, new repertory demands expanded the instrumentation of the orchestra, resulting in a flexible use of the classical-model instruments and newly developed electric and electronic instruments in various combinations. In the mid 20th century, several attempts were made in Germany and the United States to confine the instrumentation of the symphonic orchestra exclusively to groups of one instrument. In this configuration, the symphonic orchestra consisted entirely of free-reed chromatic accordions which were modified to recreate the full range of orchestral sounds and timbres during the performance of orthodox Western classical music.

The terms symphony orchestra and philharmonic orchestra may be used to distinguish different ensembles from the same locality, such as the London Symphony Orchestra and the London Philharmonic Orchestra. (Note: The present use of symphony orchestra and philharmonic orchestra to distinguish two orchestras in the same locale erases any prior difference the words' meanings may have had: Those two names for a type of orchestra are identical.) A symphony or philharmonic orchestra will usually have over eighty musicians on its roster, in some cases over a hundred, but the actual number of musicians employed in a particular performance may vary according to the work being played and the size of the venue.

A chamber orchestra is usually a smaller ensemble; a major chamber orchestra might employ as many as fifty musicians, but some are much smaller. Concert orchestra is an alternative term, as in the BBC Concert Orchestra and the RTÉ Concert Orchestra.

=== Expanded instrumentation ===
Apart from the core orchestral complement, various other instruments are called for occasionally. These include the flugelhorn and cornet. Saxophones and classical guitars, for example, appear in some 19th- through 21st-century scores. While appearing only as featured solo instruments in some works, for example Maurice Ravel's orchestration of Modest Mussorgsky's Pictures at an Exhibition and Sergei Rachmaninoff's Symphonic Dances, the saxophone is included in other works, such as Ravel's Boléro, Sergei Prokofiev's Romeo and Juliet Suites 1 and 2, Vaughan Williams' Symphonies No. 6 and No. 9, and William Walton's Belshazzar's Feast, and many other works as a member of the orchestral ensemble. The euphonium is featured in a few late Romantic and 20th century works, usually playing parts marked "tenor tuba", including Gustav Holst's The Planets, and Richard Strauss's Ein Heldenleben. The Wagner tuba, a modified member of the horn family, appears in Richard Wagner's cycle Der Ring des Nibelungen and several other works by Strauss, Igor Stravinsky (as featured in The Rite of Spring), Béla Bartók, and others; it also has a notably prominent role in Anton Bruckner's Symphony No. 7 in E Major. Cornets appear in Pyotr Ilyich Tchaikovsky's ballet Swan Lake, Claude Debussy's La Mer, and several orchestral works by Hector Berlioz. Unless these instruments are played by members "doubling" on another instrument (for example, a trombone player changing to euphonium or a bassoon player switching to contrabassoon for a certain passage), orchestras typically hire freelance musicians to augment their regular ensemble.

The 20th century orchestra was far more flexible than its predecessors. In Beethoven's and Felix Mendelssohn's time, the orchestra was composed of a fairly standard core of instruments, which was very rarely modified by composers. As time progressed, and as the Romantic period saw changes in accepted modification with composers such as Berlioz and Mahler; some composers used multiple harps and sound effect such as the wind machine. During the 20th century, the modern orchestra was generally standardized with the modern instrumentation listed below. Nevertheless, by the mid- to late 20th century, with the development of contemporary classical music, instrumentation could practically be hand-picked by the composer (e.g., to add electric instruments such as electric guitar, electronic instruments such as synthesizers, ondes martenot, or trautonium, as well as other non-Western instruments, or other instruments not traditionally used in orchestras including the: bandoneon, free bass accordion, harmonica, jews harp, mandola and water percussion.

With this history in mind, the orchestra can be analysed in five eras: the Baroque era, the Classical era, early/mid-Romantic music era, late-Romantic era and combined Modern/Postmodern eras. The first is a Baroque orchestra (i.e., J.S. Bach, Handel, Vivaldi), which generally had a smaller number of performers, and in which one or more chord-playing instruments, the basso continuo group (e.g., harpsichord or pipe organ and assorted bass instruments to perform the bassline), played an important role; the second is a typical classical period orchestra (e.g., early Beethoven along with Mozart and Haydn), which used a smaller group of performers than a Romantic music orchestra and a fairly standardized instrumentation; the third is typical of an early/mid-Romantic era (e.g., Schubert, Berlioz, Schumann, Brahms); the fourth is a late-Romantic/early 20th-century orchestra (e.g., Wagner, Mahler, Stravinsky), to the common complement of a 2010-era modern orchestra (e.g., Adams, Barber, Aaron Copland, Glass, Penderecki).

==== Late Baroque orchestra ====
Woodwinds
1-2 flutes
1–3 oboes

oboe d'amore
oboe da caccia or tenor oboe

bassoon (several players in large orchestras)
1-2 recorders

Brass
2 natural horns
2–3 natural trumpets
1-2 cornetts
3 trombones

Percussion
2 timpani (only if trumpets are required)

Keyboards
harpsichord
pipe organ

Strings
(sometimes several players per part)
1st & 2nd violins

violas
violoncellos
violones
bass viols

theorbo (a lute with extended bass register)
baroque harp

==== Classical orchestra ====
Woodwinds
1–2 flutes of which 1 might play

1 piccolo

2 oboes
2 clarinets (B♭, C, or A) both of which might also play

2 basset horns (occasionally with Mozart)

2 bassoons

1 contrabassoon (occasionally with Mozart, and Haydn, but not yet a standard instrument)

Brass
2 natural horns (valveless)
2 natural trumpets (valveless)
1 alto trombone

1 tenor trombone
1 bass trombone (on occasion Gluck, Haydn, and Mozart, but trombones not yet a standard instrument)

Percussion
2 timpani (one player)

Keyboards
harpsichord (until the late 18th century, by which time it was gradually phased out of the orchestra)
pipe organ (until the late 18th century, by which time it was gradually phased out of the orchestra)

Strings
(multiple players per part)
1st & 2nd violins

violas
cellos

double basses

==== Early Romantic orchestra ====
Woodwinds
2 flutes

1 piccolo

2 oboes
2 soprano clarinets of which both might also play

2 Basset horns (occasionally with Beethoven)

2 bassoons

1 contrabassoon

Brass
4 natural (valveless) or valved horns
2 natural or valved trumpets
3 tenor trombones of which some might play

1 alto trombone
1 bass trombone

1–2 serpents or ophicleides (gradually replaced by tubas)
Percussion
2 timpani (one player)
snare drum
bass drum
cymbals
triangle
tambourine
glockenspiel
Strings
14 1st & 12 2nd violins

10 violas
8 cellos

6 double basses
1 concert harp

==== Late Romantic orchestra ====
Woodwinds
3–4 flutes, some of which may double on

1–2 piccolos

3–4 oboes, of which some may double on

1 oboe d'amore
1 cor anglais
1 bass oboe

3–4 clarinets in B♭ or A, of which some might play

1 E♭ clarinet or D clarinet
1 basset horn
1 bass clarinet
1 contrabass clarinet

3–4 bassoons

1 contrabassoon

Brass
4–8 French horns, German horns, or Vienna horns (more rarely natural horns) of which some might play

2–4 Wagner tubas – 2 tenors, 2 bass

3–6 trumpets in F, and other keys including C, B♭ of which some might play

1 bass trumpet
3–4 cornets

3–4 tenor trombones (alto trombone parts from the classical era usually played on tenor trombone)

1–2 bass trombones of which 1 might play
1 contrabass trombone

1–2 tubas

1 euphonium (usually played by a trombonist when needed)

Keyboards
piano
reed organ
celesta

Percussion
4 or more timpani (one player)
snare drum
bass drum
cymbals
tam-tam
triangle
tambourine
glockenspiel
xylophone
tubular bells

Strings
16 1st (sometimes more) & 14 2nd violins

12 violas
12 cellos

10 double basses
2 or more concert harps

==== Modern/Postmodern orchestra ====
Modern symphony orchestra layout (Exact layout varies; the image above is just one possible arrangement, with another popular arrangement seeing the strings in similar positions but in the sequence of firsts, seconds, violas, and cellos)

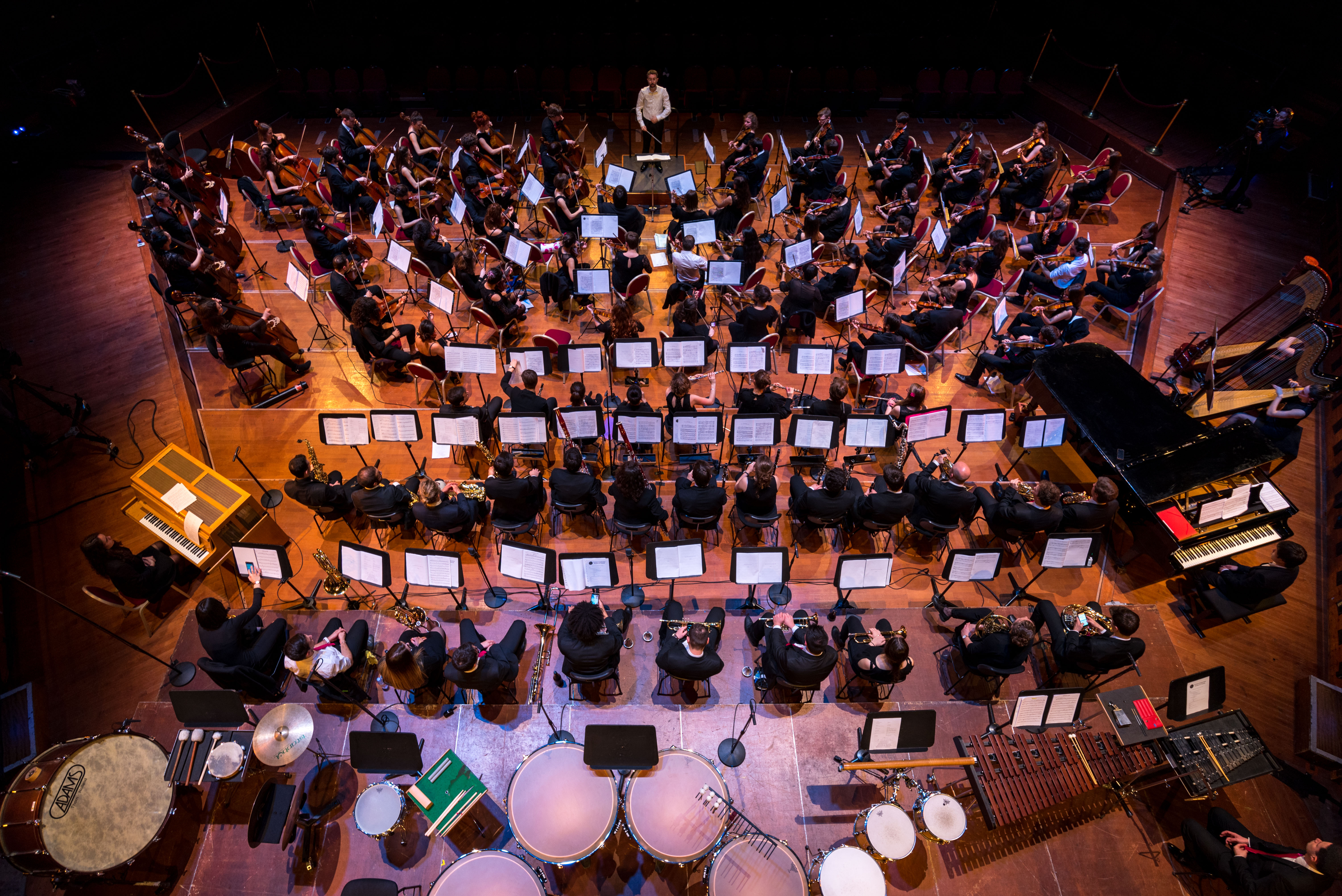
Symphonic orchestra, on stage, seen from above

Woodwinds
2-4 flutes of which some might play:

1–2 piccolos
1 alto flute
1 bass flute

2–4 oboes of which 1–2 might play:

1 cor anglais
1 oboe d'amore
1 bass oboe
1 heckelphone

2–4 B♭ soprano clarinets or A soprano clarinets which some might play:

1 E♭ sopranino clarinet
1 alto clarinet
1 basset horn
1 bass clarinet
1 contra-alto clarinet
1 contrabass clarinet

2–4 bassoons, of which 1 might play:

1 contrabassoon

1 soprano saxophone (optional)

2 alto saxophones (optional)
1 tenor saxophone (optional)
1 baritone saxophone (optional)
1 bass saxophone (optional)

Brass
4–8 French horns (double horns) in F/B♭ of which some might play

2–4 Wagner horns

3–6 trumpets in B♭ of which some might play:

1 soprano cornet
2–3 cornets
1 piccolo trumpet (often for playing very high parts originally for natural trumpets)
1 bass trumpet
1 flugelhorn
2-4 tenor horns

1 alto trombone (restored to the postmodern orchestra for playing music of the classical era)
3–6 tenor trombones (current modern orchestra standard)
1–2 bass trombones of which 1 might play:

1 contrabass trombone
1 cimbasso

1–2 tubas of which 1 might play

1 baritone horn
1 euphonium
1 sousaphone (only used for performing jazz music)

Percussion
4–5 timpani (one player)
orchestral snare drum
orchestral bass drum (also known as Grancassa)
a pairs of orchestral cymbals (one player)
triangle
orchestral tam-tam
orchestral tambourine
orchestral glockenspiel
orchestral xylophone
orchestral vibraphone
orchestral marimba
tubular bells
drum kit (in some works)

Other percussion instruments, includes sound effect percussion instruments (such as wood block, crotales, waterphone, mark tree, sleigh bells, bell tree, vibraslap, flexatone, whip & finger cymbals) and folk, ethnic or world music percussion instruments (such as taiko, temple block, wind chimes, tabla, hang drum, steel drum, castanets, cowbell, agogô, güiro, cuíca, bongos, conga, cajón, darbuka, timbales, claves, maracas, cabasa & rain sticks) specified by composers.

Keyboards
piano
pipe organ
harpsichord
accordion
celesta
keyboard glockenspiel
melodica
accordina
reed organ (used in early 20th century postmodern era(1900 to 1950))

Strings
16 1st & 14 2nd violins

12–14 violas
10–14 cellos

6-8 double basses
1–2 harps
classical guitars (with nylon-strings designed for classical, latin & flamenco music)

acoustic guitars (with steel-strings designed for pop, country & folk music)
acoustic archtop guitars (also known as acoustic jazz guitar with steel-string designed for jazz & blues music. Example guitar brands model like "Benedetto La Venezia")

Miscellaneous
chromatic harmonica

Other miscellaneous sound effect instruments (such as slide whistle, Aztec death whistle & Acme siren) specified by composers.

Electrophone
As required by the compositions in the program, various electric instruments or electronic instruments may be used in the orchestra. These performers are not typically permanent orchestra members. They are typically freelancers hired on contract for one or more concerts. Instruments may include:

- theremin
- ondes Martenot
- electric & electric bass guitar
- electric double bass
- electric violin, viola & cello
- electric organ (Hammond)
- grand digital music keyboard (Lowrey)
- electric piano
- keytar
- digital accordion
- ring modulators
- synthesizer
- Synclavier
- Novachord
- clavinet
- electronic wind instrument
- electric harp
- digital drum kit
- Other electronic musical instruments
- Non-musical instruments such as a typewriter or reel-to-reel tape player

== Organization ==
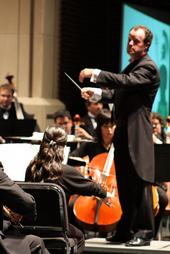
Conducting an orchestra

Among the instrument groups and within each group of instruments, there is a generally accepted hierarchy. Every instrumental group (or section) has a principal who is generally responsible for leading the group and playing orchestral solos. The violins are divided into two groups, first violin and second violin, with the second violins playing in lower registers than the first violins, playing an accompaniment part, or harmonizing the melody played by the first violins. The principal first violin is called the concertmaster (or orchestra "leader" in the U.K.) and is not only considered the leader of the string section, but the second-in-command of the entire orchestra, behind only the conductor. The concertmaster leads the pre-concert tuning and handles musical aspects of orchestra management, such as determining the bowings for the violins or the entire string section. The concertmaster usually sits to the conductor's left, closest to the audience. There is also a principal second violin, a principal viola, a principal cello, and a principal bass.

The principal trombone is considered the leader of the low brass section, while the principal trumpet is generally considered the leader of the entire brass section. While the oboe often provides the tuning note for the orchestra (due to a 300-year-old convention), there is generally no designated principal of the woodwind section (though in woodwind ensembles, the flute is often the presumptive leader). Instead, each principal confers with the others as equals in the case of musical differences of opinion. Most sections also have an assistant principal (or co-principal or associate principal), or in the case of the first violins, an assistant concertmaster, who often plays a tutti part in addition to replacing the principal in their absence.

A section string player plays in unison with the rest of the section, except in the case of divided (divisi) parts, where upper and lower parts in the music are often assigned to "outside" (nearer the audience) and "inside" seated players. Where a solo part is called for in a string section, the section leader invariably plays that part. The section leader (or principal) of a string section is also responsible for determining the bowings, often based on the bowings set out by the concertmaster. In some cases, the principal of a string section may use a slightly different bowing than the concertmaster, to accommodate the requirements of playing their instrument (e.g., the double-bass section). Principals of a string section will also lead entrances for their section, typically by lifting the bow before the entrance, to ensure the section plays together. Tutti wind and brass players generally play a unique but non-solo part. Section percussionists play parts assigned to them by the principal percussionist.

In modern times, the musicians are usually directed by a conductor, although early orchestras did not have one, giving this role to the concertmaster or the harpsichordist playing the continuo. Some modern orchestras also do without conductors, particularly smaller orchestras and those specializing in historically accurate (so-called "period") performances of baroque and earlier music.

The most frequently performed repertoire for a symphony orchestra is Western classical music or opera. However, orchestras are used sometimes in popular music (e.g., to accompany a rock or pop band in a concert), extensively in film music, and increasingly often in television and video game music. Orchestras are also used in the symphonic metal genre. The term "orchestra" can also be applied to a jazz ensemble, for example in the performance of big-band music.

=== Selection and appointment of members ===
In the 2000s, all tenured members of a professional orchestra normally audition for positions in the ensemble. Performers typically play one or more solo pieces of the auditionee's choice, such as a movement of a concerto, a solo Bach movement, and a variety of excerpts from the orchestral literature that are advertised in the audition poster (so the auditionees can prepare). The excerpts are typically the most technically challenging parts and solos from the orchestral literature. Orchestral auditions are typically held in front of a panel that includes the conductor, the concertmaster, the principal player of the section for which the auditionee is applying, and possibly other principal players.

The most promising candidates from the first round of auditions are invited to return for a second or third round of auditions, which allows the conductor and the panel to compare the best candidates. Performers may be asked to sight read orchestral music. The final stage of the audition process in some orchestras is a test week, in which the performer plays with the orchestra for a week or two, which allows the conductor and principal players to see if the individual can function well in an actual rehearsal and performance setting.

There are a range of different employment arrangements. The most sought-after positions are permanent, tenured positions in the orchestra. Orchestras also hire musicians on contracts, ranging in length from a single concert to a full season or more. Contract performers may be hired for individual concerts when the orchestra is doing an exceptionally large late-Romantic era orchestral work, or to substitute for a permanent member who is sick. A professional musician who is hired to perform for a single concert is sometimes called a "sub". Some contract musicians may be hired to replace permanent members for the period that the permanent member is on parental leave or disability leave.

==== History of gender in ensembles ====
Historically, major professional orchestras have been mostly or entirely composed of men. The first women members hired in professional orchestras have been harpists. The Vienna Philharmonic, for example, did not accept women to permanent membership until 1997, far later than comparable orchestras (the other orchestras ranked among the world's top five by Gramophone in 2008). The last major orchestra to appoint a woman to a permanent position was the Berlin Philharmonic. In February 1996, the Vienna Philharmonic's principal flute, Dieter Flury, told Westdeutscher Rundfunk that accepting women would be "gambling with the emotional unity (emotionelle Geschlossenheit) that this organism currently has". In April 1996, the orchestra's press secretary wrote that "compensating for the expected leaves of absence" of maternity leave would be a problem.

In 1997, the Vienna Philharmonic was "facing protests during a [US] tour" by the National Organization for Women and the International Alliance for Women in Music. Finally, "after being held up to increasing ridicule even in socially conservative Austria, members of the orchestra gathered [on 28 February 1997] in an extraordinary meeting on the eve of their departure and agreed to admit a woman, Anna Lelkes, as harpist." As of 2013, the orchestra has six female members; one of them, violinist Albena Danailova, became one of the orchestra's concertmasters in 2008, the first woman to hold that position in that orchestra. In 2012, women made up 6% of the orchestra's membership. VPO president Clemens Hellsberg said the VPO now uses completely screened blind auditions.

In 2013, an article in Mother Jones stated that while "[m]any prestigious orchestras have significant female membership — women outnumber men in the New York Philharmonic's violin section — and several renowned ensembles, including the National Symphony Orchestra, the Detroit Symphony, and the Minnesota Symphony, are led by women violinists", the double bass, brass, and percussion sections of major orchestras "... are still predominantly male." A 2014 BBC article stated that the "... introduction of 'blind' auditions, where a prospective instrumentalist performs behind a screen so that the judging panel can exercise no gender or racial prejudice, has seen the gender balance of traditionally male-dominated symphony orchestras gradually shift."

== Amateur ensembles ==
There are also a variety of amateur orchestras:

School orchestras
These orchestras consist of students from elementary or secondary school. They may be students from a music class or program or they may be drawn from the entire school body. School orchestras are typically led by a music teacher. In some cases, school orchestras are string orchestras, consisting only of students playing string instruments, with students playing woodwinds, brass and percussion grouped together as a concert band.
University or conservatory orchestras
These orchestras consist of students from a university or music conservatory. In some cases, university orchestras are open to all students from a university, from all programs. Larger universities may have two or more university orchestras: one or more orchestras made up of music majors (or, for major music programs, several tiers of music major orchestras, ranked by skill level) and a second orchestra open to university students from all academic programs (e.g., science, business, etc.) who have previous classical music experience on an orchestral instrument. University and conservatory orchestras are led by a conductor who is typically a professor or instructor at the university or conservatory.
Youth orchestras
These orchestras consist of teens and young adults drawn from an entire city or region. The age range in youth orchestras varies between different ensembles. In some cases, youth orchestras may consist of teens or young adults from an entire country (e.g., Canada's National Youth Orchestra).
Community orchestras
These orchestras consist of amateur performers drawn from an entire city or region. Community orchestras typically consist mainly of adult amateur musicians. Community orchestras range in level from beginner-level orchestras which rehearse music without doing formal performances in front of an audience to intermediate-level ensembles to advanced amateur groups which play standard professional orchestra repertoire. In some cases, university or conservatory music students may also be members of community orchestras. While community orchestra members are mostly unpaid amateurs, in some orchestras, a small number of professionals may be hired to act as principal players and section leaders.

== Repertoire and performances ==
Orchestras play a wide range of repertoire ranging from 17th-century dance suites, 18th century divertimentos to 20th-century film scores and 21st-century symphonies. Orchestras have become synonymous with the symphony, an extended musical composition in Western classical music that typically contains multiple movements which provide contrasting keys and tempos. Symphonies are notated in a musical score, which contains all the instrument parts. The conductor uses the score to study the symphony before rehearsals and decide on their interpretation (e.g., tempos, articulation, phrasing, etc.), and to follow the music during rehearsals and concerts, while leading the ensemble. Orchestral musicians play from parts containing just the notated music for their instrument. A small number of symphonies also contain vocal parts (e.g., Beethoven's Ninth Symphony).

Orchestras also perform overtures, a term originally applied to the instrumental introduction to an opera. During the early Romantic era, composers such as Beethoven and Mendelssohn began to use the term to refer to independent, self-existing instrumental, programmatic works that presaged genres such as the symphonic poem, a form devised by Franz Liszt in several works that began as dramatic overtures. These were "at first undoubtedly intended to be played at the head of a programme". In the 1850s the concert overture began to be supplanted by the symphonic poem.

Orchestras also play with instrumental soloists in concertos. During concertos, the orchestra plays an accompaniment role to the soloist (e.g., a solo violinist or pianist) and, at times, introduces musical themes or interludes while the soloist is not playing. Orchestras also play during operas, ballets, some musical theatre works and some choral works (both sacred works such as Masses and secular works). In operas and ballets, the orchestra accompanies the singers and dancers, respectively, and plays overtures and interludes where the melodies played by the orchestra take centre stage.

=== Performances ===
In the Baroque era, orchestras performed in a range of venues, including at the fine houses of aristocrats, in opera halls and in churches. Some wealthy aristocrats had an orchestra in residence at their estate, to entertain them and their guests with performances. During the Classical era, as composers increasingly sought out financial support from the general public, orchestra concerts were increasingly held in public concert halls, where music lovers could buy tickets to hear the orchestra. Aristocratic patronage of orchestras continued during the Classical era, but this went on alongside public concerts. In the 20th and 21st century, orchestras found a new patron: governments. Many orchestras in North America and Europe receive part of their funding from national, regional level governments (e.g., state governments in the U.S.) or city governments. These government subsidies make up part of orchestra revenue, along with ticket sales, charitable donations (if the orchestra is registered as a charity) and other fundraising activities. With the invention of successive technologies, including sound recording, radio broadcasting, television broadcasting and Internet-based streaming and downloading of concert videos, orchestras have been able to find new revenue sources.

=== Issues in performance ===
==== Faking ====
One of the "great unmentionable [topics] of orchestral playing" is "faking", the process by which an orchestral musician gives the false "... impression of playing every note as written", typically for a very challenging passage that is very high or very fast, while not actually playing the notes that are in the printed music part. An article in The Strad states that all orchestral musicians, even those in the top orchestras, occasionally fake certain passages. One reason that musicians fake is because there are not enough rehearsals. Another factor is the extreme challenges in 20th century and 21st century contemporary pieces; some professionals said "faking" was "necessary in anything from ten to almost ninety per cent of some modern works". Professional players who were interviewed were of a consensus that faking may be acceptable when a part is not written well for the instrument, but faking "just because you haven't practised" the music is not acceptable.

=== Counter-revolution ===
With the advent of the early music movement, smaller orchestras where players worked on execution of works in styles derived from the study of older treatises on playing became common. These include the Orchestra of the Age of Enlightenment, the London Classical Players under the direction of Sir Roger Norrington and the Academy of Ancient Music under Christopher Hogwood, among others.

=== Recent trends in the United States ===
In the United States, the late 20th century saw a crisis of funding and support for orchestras. The size and cost of a symphony orchestra, compared to the size of the base of supporters, became an issue that struck at the core of the institution. Few orchestras could fill auditoriums, and the time-honored season-subscription system became increasingly anachronistic, as more and more listeners would buy tickets on an ad-hoc basis for individual events. Orchestral endowments and — more centrally to the daily operation of American orchestras — orchestral donors have seen investment portfolios shrink, or produce lower yields, reducing the ability of donors to contribute; further, there has been a trend toward donors finding other social causes more compelling. While government funding is less central to American than European orchestras, cuts in such funding are still significant for American ensembles. Finally, the drastic drop in revenues from recording, related to changes in the recording industry itself, began a period of change that has yet to reach its conclusion.

U.S. orchestras that have gone into Chapter 11 bankruptcy include the Philadelphia Orchestra (April 2011), and the Louisville Orchestra (December 2010); orchestras that have gone into Chapter 7 bankruptcy and have ceased operations include the Northwest Chamber Orchestra in 2006, the Honolulu Orchestra in March 2011, the New Mexico Symphony Orchestra in April 2011, and the Syracuse Symphony in June 2011. The Festival of Orchestras in Orlando, Florida, ceased operations at the end of March 2011.

One source of financial difficulties that received notice and criticism was high salaries for music directors of US orchestras, which led several high-profile conductors to take pay cuts in recent years. Music administrators such as Michael Tilson Thomas and Esa-Pekka Salonen argued that new music, new means of presenting it, and a renewed relationship with the community could revitalize the symphony orchestra. The American critic Greg Sandow has argued in detail that orchestras must revise their approach to music, performance, the concert experience, marketing, public relations, community involvement, and presentation to bring them in line with the expectations of 21st century audiences immersed in popular culture.

It is not uncommon for contemporary composers to use unconventional instruments, including various synthesizers, to achieve desired effects. Many, however, find more conventional orchestral configuration to provide better possibilities for color and depth. Composers like John Adams often employ Romantic-size orchestras, as in Adams' opera Nixon in China; Philip Glass and others may be more free, yet still identify size-boundaries. Glass in particular has recently turned to conventional orchestras in works like the Concerto for Cello and Orchestra and the Violin Concerto No. 2.

Along with a decrease in funding, some U.S. orchestras have reduced their overall personnel, as well as the number of players appearing in performances. The reduced numbers in performance are usually confined to the string section, since the numbers here have traditionally been flexible (as multiple players typically play from the same part).

== Role of conductor ==
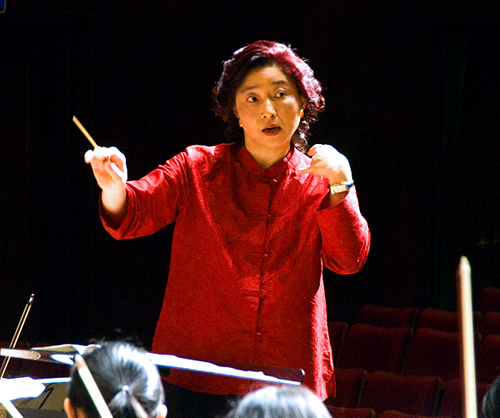
Apo Hsu, using a baton, conducts the NTNU Symphony Orchestra in Taipei, Taiwan.

Conducting is the art of directing a musical performance, such as an orchestral or choral concert. The primary duties of the conductor are to set the tempo, ensure correct entries by various members of the ensemble, and "shape" the phrasing where appropriate. To convey their ideas and interpretation, a conductor communicates with their musicians primarily through hand gestures, typically (though not invariably) with the aid of a baton, and may use other gestures or signals, such as eye contact with relevant performers. A conductor's directions will almost invariably be supplemented or reinforced by verbal instructions or suggestions to their musicians in rehearsal prior to a performance.

The conductor typically stands on a raised podium with a large music stand for the full score, which contains the musical notation for all the instruments and voices. Since the mid-18th century, most conductors have not played an instrument when conducting, although in earlier periods of classical music history, leading an ensemble while playing an instrument was common. In Baroque music from the 1600s to the 1750s, the group would typically be led by the harpsichordist or first violinist (see concertmaster), an approach that in modern times has been revived by several music directors for music from this period. Conducting while playing a piano or synthesizer may also be done with musical theatre pit orchestras. Communication is typically non-verbal during a performance (this is strictly the case in art music, but in jazz big bands or large pop ensembles, there may be occasional spoken instructions, such as a "count in"). However, in rehearsals, frequent interruptions allow the conductor to give verbal directions as to how the music should be played or sung.

Conductors act as guides to the orchestras or choirs they conduct. They choose the works to be performed and study their scores, to which they may make certain adjustments (e.g., regarding tempo, articulation, phrasing, repetitions of sections, and so on), work out their interpretation, and relay their vision to the performers. They may also attend to organizational matters, such as scheduling rehearsals, planning a concert season, hearing auditions and selecting members, and promoting their ensemble in the media. Orchestras, choirs, concert bands and other sizable musical ensembles such as big bands are usually led by conductors.

=== Conductorless orchestras ===
In the Baroque music era (1600–1750), most orchestras were led by one of the musicians, typically the principal first violin, called the concertmaster. The concertmaster would lead the tempo of pieces by lifting their bow in a rhythmic manner. Leadership might also be provided by one of the chord-playing instrumentalists playing the basso continuo part which was the core of most Baroque instrumental ensemble pieces. Typically, this would be a harpsichord player, a pipe organist, or a lutist or theorbo player. A keyboard player could lead the ensemble with their head, or by taking one of the hands off the keyboard to lead a more difficult tempo change. A lutenist or theorbo player could lead by lifting the instrument neck up and down to indicate the tempo of a piece, or to lead a ritard during a cadence or ending. In some works which combined choirs and instrumental ensembles, two leaders were sometimes used: A concertmaster to lead the instrumentalists and a chord-playing performer to lead the singers. During the Classical music period (c. 1720–1800), the practice of using chordal instruments to play basso continuo was gradually phased out, and it disappeared completely by 1800. Instead, ensembles began to use conductors to lead the orchestra's tempos and playing style, while the concertmaster played an additional leadership role for the musicians, especially the string players, who imitate the bowstroke and playing style of the concertmaster, to the degree that is feasible for the different stringed instruments.

In 1922, the idea of a conductor-less orchestra was revived in post-revolutionary Soviet Union. The symphony orchestra Persimfans was formed without a conductor, because the founders believed that the ensemble should be modeled on the ideal Marxist state, in which all people are equal. As such, its members felt that there was no need to be led by the dictatorial baton of a conductor; instead they were led by a committee, which determined tempos and playing styles. Although it was a partial success within the Soviet Union, the principal difficulty with the concept was in changing tempo during performances, because even if the committee had issued a decree about where a tempo change should take place, there was no leader in the ensemble to guide this tempo change. The orchestra survived for ten years before Stalin's cultural politics disbanded it by taking away its funding.

In Western nations, some ensembles, such as the Orpheus Chamber Orchestra, based in New York City, have had more success with conductorless orchestras, although decisions are likely to be deferred to some sense of leadership within the ensemble (for example, the principal wind and string players, notably the concertmaster). Others have returned to the tradition of a principal player, usually a violinist, being the artistic director and running rehearsal and leading concerts. Examples include the Australian Chamber Orchestra, Amsterdam Sinfonietta & Candida Thompson and the New Century Chamber Orchestra. As well, as part of the early music movement, some 20th and 21st century orchestras have revived the Baroque practice of having no conductor on the podium for Baroque pieces, using the concertmaster or a chord-playing basso continuo performer (e.g., harpsichord or organ) to lead the group.

=== Multiple conductors ===
==== Offstage instruments ====
Some orchestral works specify that an offstage trumpet should be used or that other instruments from the orchestra should be positioned off-stage or behind the stage, to create a haunted, mystical effect. To ensure that the offstage instrumentalist(s) play in time, sometimes a sub-conductor will be stationed offstage with a clear view of the principal conductor. Examples include the ending of "Neptune" from Gustav Holst's The Planets. The principal conductor leads the large orchestra, and the sub-conductor relays the principal conductor's tempo and gestures to the offstage musician (or musicians). One of the challenges with using two conductors is that the second conductor may get out of synchronization with the main conductor, or may mis-convey (or misunderstand) the principal conductor's gestures, which can lead to the offstage instruments being out of time. In the late 20th century and early 21st century, some orchestras use a video camera pointed at the principal conductor and a closed-circuit TV set in front of the offstage performers, instead of using two conductors.

==== Contemporary music ====
The techniques of polystylism and polytempo music have led a few 20th and 21st century composers to write music where multiple orchestras or ensembles perform simultaneously. These trends have brought about the phenomenon of polyconductor music, wherein separate sub-conductors conduct each group of musicians. Usually, one principal conductor conducts the sub-conductors, thereby shaping the overall performance. In Percy Grainger's The Warriors which includes three conductors: the primary conductor of the orchestra, a secondary conductor directing an off-stage brass ensemble, and a tertiary conductor directing percussion and harp. One example in the late-century orchestral music is Karlheinz Stockhausen's Gruppen, for three orchestras, which are placed around the audience. This way, the "sound masses" could be spatialized, as in an electroacoustic work. Gruppen was premiered in Cologne, in 1958, conducted by Stockhausen, Bruno Maderna and Pierre Boulez. It has been performed in 1996 by Simon Rattle, John Carewe and Daniel Harding.

== See also ==
- Chinese orchestra
- Gamelan
- List of symphony orchestras
- Orchestral enhancement
- Orchestration
- Radio orchestra
- Rhythm section
- Shorthand for orchestra instrumentation
- String orchestra
