= Borsos =

Borsos is a surname. Notable people with the surname include:

- Attila Borsos (born 1966), Hungarian handball player
- Gábor Borsos (born 1991), Hungarian tennis player
- Gabriella Borsós, Hungarian politician
- József Borsos (1821–1883), Hungarian portrait painter and photographer
- Miklós Borsos (1906–1990), Hungarian sculptor and medallist
- Phillip Borsos (1953–1995), Canadian film director and film producer
- Tamás Borsos (1566–after 1633), Hungarian politician and diplomat
- Tamás Borsos (handballer) (born 1990), Hungarian handball player

== See also ==
- Borso
