= François Budet =

French singer-songwriter, novelist and poet

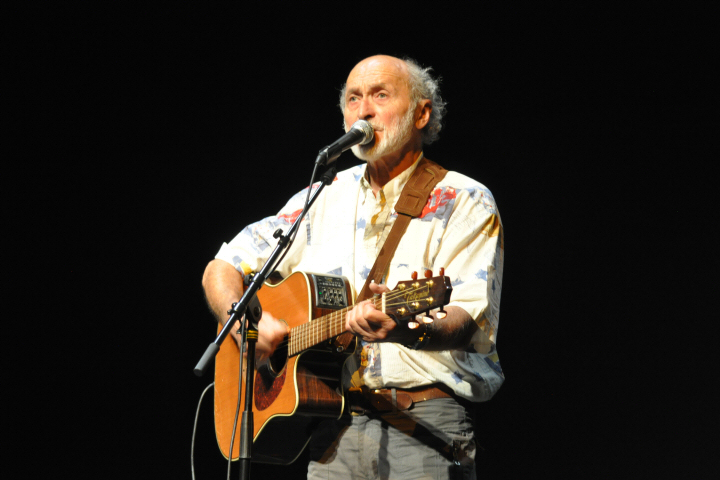
- Born: 3 October 1940; Plaine-Haute, Côtes-d'Armor, France
- Died: 5 July 2018 (aged 77); Plaine-Haute, Côtes-d'Armor, France
- Children: Yelle

François Budet (3 October 1940 – 5 July 2018) was a French singer-songwriter, novelist and poet.
