= Keyboard section =

Part of an orchestra or concert band containing keyboard instruments

The keyboard section of an orchestra or concert band includes keyboard instruments. Keyboard instruments are not usually a standard members of a modern orchestra or concert band, but they are included occasionally. In orchestras from the 1600s to the mid-1750s, a keyboard instrument such as the pipe organ or harpsichord was normally played with an orchestra, with the performer improvising chords from a figured bass part. This practice, called basso continuo, was phased out after 1750 (although some Masses for choir and orchestra would occasionally still have a keyboard part in the late 1700s).

== Members ==
Common members of this section are:

- Piano: although infrequent in standard symphonic repertoire, many larger-scale works call for this instrument, and often has very important roles to play. These include Ottorino Respighi's Pines of Rome, Igor Stravinsky's Petrushka (almost scored as a piano concerto), Leonard Bernstein's West Side Story, most of Bohuslav Martinů's orchestral compositions, and many of Sergei Prokofiev and Dmitri Shostakovich's symphonies. It is more frequently found in 20th- and 21st-century pieces, such as Aaron Copland's "Hoedown" and Stravinsky's Symphony in Three Movements.
- Pipe organ or harpsichord (in 17th- and early 18th-century works with basso continuo accompaniment; occasionally pipe organ is used in later music, such as Richard Strauss's Also sprach Zarathustra, Gustav Mahler's Eighth Symphony, Camille Saint-Saëns's Organ Symphony (Symphony No. 3), Edward Elgar's Enigma Variations (final variation), and Gustav Holst's suite, The Planets.
- Celesta (from the late-19th century onward, in works like Tchaikovsky's Nutcracker Suite)
- Keyboard glockenspiel (from the early 18th century onward, first by Handel in 1739 in his oratorio Saul)
- Ondes Martenot, an early electronic musical instrument invented in 1928 that creates eerie wavering notes. It includes both a keyboard and a wire that a ring can be slid across to produce a smoothly varying pitch, but is usually placed in the keyboard section. Notable examples of its orchestral use include Olivier Messiaen's Turangalîla-Symphonie and Trois Petites Liturgies de la Présence Divine, as well as his opera Saint-François d'Assise, which requires three of the instruments.
- Synthesizer (called for in some 20th- and 21st-century works, like John Adams's Short Ride in a Fast Machine and the Requiem Mass by Andrew Lloyd Webber)

== Less common members ==
- Electronic organs, such as the Hammond and Lowrey organs
- Fender Rhodes (e.g., Bill Evans' "Symbiosis" for Fender Rhodes and orchestra (1974))
- Harmonium
- Regal
- Accordion (e.g., Virgil Thomson's film music for Louisiana Story)

Although technically not a keyboard instrument, the cimbalom, a concert hammered dulcimer, is usually placed in the keyboard section, as in Franz Liszt's Hungarian Rhapsody No. 6 and Béla Bartók's First Rhapsody for violin and orchestra. In some cases, one or more concert harps may be placed in the keyboard section, such as in Joseph Marx's Eine Herbstsymphonie.

== See also ==
- String section
- Woodwind section
- Brass section
- Percussion section
