= Keyboard glockenspiel =

Instrument consisting of a glockenspiel operated by a piano keyboard

The keyboard glockenspiel (French: jeu de timbre) or organ glockenspiel is an instrument consisting of a glockenspiel operated by a piano keyboard. It was first used by George Frideric Handel in the oratorio Saul (1739). It was also used in the 1739 revivals of his Il Trionfo del Tempo and Acis and Galatea, and the next year in L'Allegro, il Penseroso ed il Moderato. Half a century later, Wolfgang Amadeus Mozart employed a strumento d'acciaio in The Magic Flute (1791) to represent Papageno's magic bells. It is now considered proven that Mozart meant a keyboard glockenspiel.

From the 19th century onwards, the keyboard glockenspiel fell into the background due to the introduction of the celesta in 1886, which, due to its larger range and more modern construction, could also play more difficult glockenspiel parts.[9] In contrast to the very soft sound of the celesta (produced by the felt hammers of the playing mechanism), the historical keyboard glockenspiel had a very clear, metallic sound. Its sound plates were struck with steel or hard plastic clappers. It had no sound-enhancing soundboard and usually had a range of 2 to 2.5 octaves. There are also a smaller number of historical instruments with a range of 3 1/3 octaves (C5–E8).

Keyboard glockenspiel Clavitimbre:

Around 1949, the French company Société Mustel S.A. in Paris (descendants of the famous inventor of the celesta, August Victor Mustel) began developing a keyboard glockenspiel (jeu de timbre á clavier). The instrument appeared in 1950 and had silver-steel sound plates struck by small hammers with bronze heads. To improve the sound, cylindrical aluminum resonators were mounted above the sound plates, a completely new development. Additionally, a damping mechanism with a wooden pedal was incorporated, similar to that used on a piano. The use of the pedal limits the stroke of the hammers and made it possible to produce soft nuances for the first time on a keyboard glockenspiel. The instrument has a piano-like body and a range of C5 – E8. The Mustel company changed the name of the newly developed keyboard glockenspiel and gave it the name clavitimbre.

Although the sound is completely different this part is nowadays sometimes taken by a celesta. Maurice Ravel preferred the keyboard version of the instrument because it can play a true ff dynamic for brilliance and iridescence in orchestral climaxes. In the late 20th century, the firm of Bergerault began manufacturing a three-octave (F_{2}–E_{4}) mallet instrument with a damping mechanism operated by a foot pedal, which is capable of dealing with the wide range called for in contemporary scores.

== Use ==
More recently, the keyboard glockenspiel has been used by:

- Danny Federici of the E Street Band in numerous concerts and recordings
- Richard Wagner in his opera Die Walküre
- Giacomo Meyerbeer in his opera L'Africaine
- Léo Delibes in his opera Lakmé
- Jules Massenet in his oratorio La Vierge
- Giacomo Puccini in his operas Turandot and Madama Butterfly
- Richard Strauss in his tone-poem Don Juan
- Claude Debussy in La Mer
- Maurice Ravel in Daphnis et Chloé and Ma mère l'oye
- Ottorino Respighi in the Pines of Rome
- Kurt Atterberg in his Sixth Symphony
- Arthur Honegger in his Fourth Symphony
- Olivier Messiaen in his Turangalîla-Symphonie (where it appears along with celesta)
- Karlheinz Stockhausen in his Gruppen (1955–57), some versions of Refrain (1959) and Punkte (1969–93).
- Gryphon on their albums Midnight Mushrumps (1974) and Raindance (1975).
- Henri Dutilleux in L'arbre des songes (1985).

== Position in the orchestra ==
Owing to the skills required of the player, the keyboard glockenspiel is placed in the keyboard section of the orchestra rather than the percussion section, and is similarly not regarded as a keyboard percussion instrument. It is however regarded as pitched percussion in organology.

== Sources ==
- Blades, James; Holland, James (2001). "Glockenspiel (i)". In Sadie, Stanley; Tyrrell, John (eds.). The New Grove Dictionary of Music and Musicians (2 ed.). London: Macmillan. ISBN 0-333-91398-1.
- Del Mar, Norman (1983). Anatomy of the Orchestra. Berkeley and Los Angeles: University of California Press. ISBN 0-520-05062-2.
- Schuller, Gunther (1997). The Compleat Conductor. Oxford and New York: Oxford University Press. ISBN 0-19-512661-0.
