= Stanislav Gorkovenko =

Soviet and Russian conductor (1938–2018)

- Born: 30 January 1938; Baku, Azerbaijan
- Died: 26 November 2018 (aged 80)
- Genres: Opera, classical
- Occupation(s): Conductor, songwriter
- Formerly of: Leningrad Music Hall Orchestra; Solovyov-Sedoi Gubernatorial Orchestra

Stanislav Gorkovenko (30 January 1938 – 26 November 2018) was a Soviet and Russian conductor from Baku who graduated from the Azerbaijan and Saint Petersburg Conservatories where he was under guidance from Nikolai Rabinovich. From 1967 to 1978 he was in charge of the Leningrad Music Hall Orchestra and since 1978 was a head conductor of the Solovyov-Sedoi Gubernatorial Orchestra. He is also an author of numerous songs and operas that are designed for children. One of his operas called Ognivo was staged at the Samara Opera and Ballet Theatre.

== Awards ==
Gorkovenko received awards from the Government of St. Petersburg in the field of literature, art and architecture in 2001 and 2017. In 2008, he was awarded the Order of Honor and the Badge of Distinction for services to Saint Petersburg.
