= Percussion section =

One of the main divisions of an orchestra

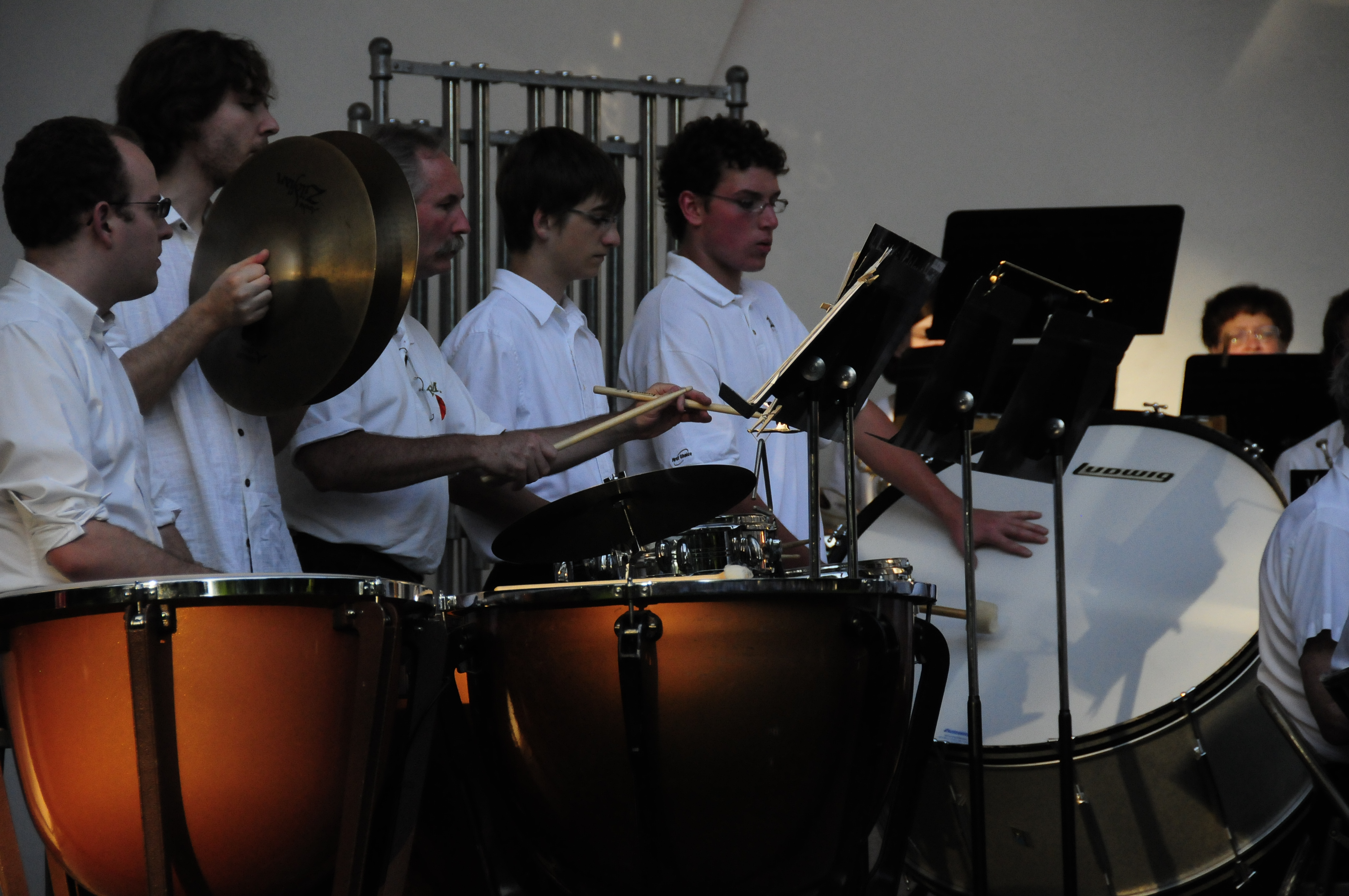
A percussion section with pitched percussion (tubular bells, background), auxiliary percussion (crash cymbals, suspended cymbal, snare drum and bass drum) and timpani (foreground) in use

The percussion section is one of the main divisions of the orchestra and the concert band. It includes most percussion instruments and all unpitched instruments.

The percussion section is itself divided into three subsections:

- Pitched percussion, consisting of pitched instruments such as glockenspiel and tubular bells and Timpani.
- Unpitched percussion, consisting of all unpitched instruments such as snare drum and cymbals.

These two subsections reflect the three main skill areas that a percussionist studies.

Percussion sections, consisting of similar instruments, may also be found in stage bands and other musical ensembles.

== Tuned percussion ==
See also untuned percussion

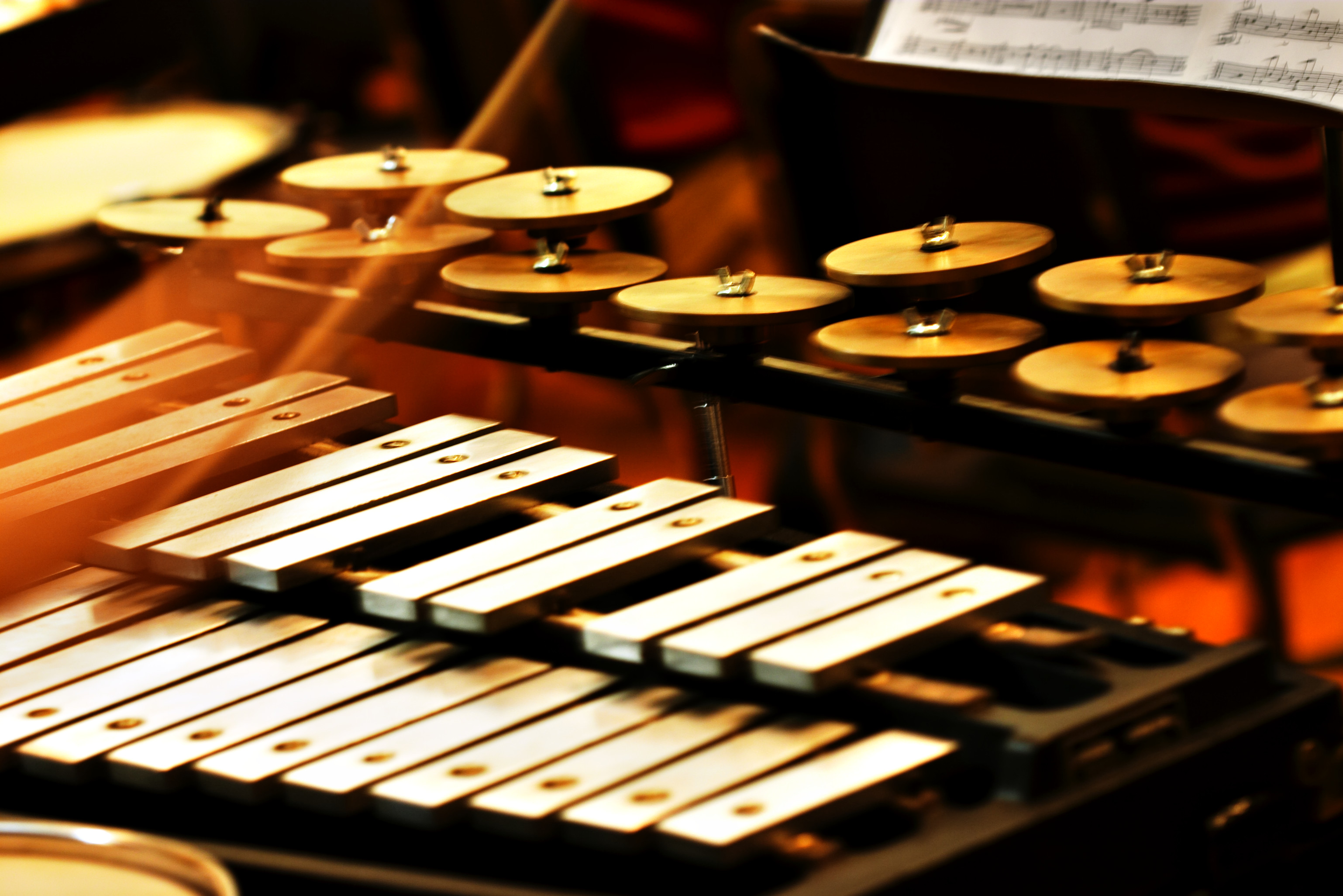
Pitched percussion: A glockenspiel and a set of crotales in use.

This subsection is traditionally called tuned percussion, however the corresponding term untuned percussion is avoided in modern organology in favour of the term unpitched percussion, so the instruments of this subsection are similarly termed pitched percussion. All instruments of this subsection are pitched, and with the exception of the timpani, all pitched instruments of the percussion section are in this subsection.

They include:

- All mallet percussion instruments, and keyboard percussion instruments such as the xylophone and tubular bells.
- Collections of pitched instruments such as hand bells, tuned cowbells and crotales.
- Most other melodic percussion instruments.

Despite the name, keyboard percussion instruments do not have keyboards as such. Keyboard instruments such as the celesta and keyboard glockenspiel are not included in the percussion section owing to the very different skills required to play them, but instead are grouped in the keyboard section with instruments that require similar skills.

== Unpitched percussion ==
All unpitched percussion instruments are grouped into the unpitched percussion subsection, which includes an enormous variety of instruments, including drums, cymbals, bells, shakers, whistles and even found objects.

Players are expected to be accomplished on the snare drum, bass drum, clash cymbals and other hand percussion, and to be able to adapt these skills to playing other instruments and even objects, for example the typewriter.

== See also ==
- Classification of percussion instruments
- String section
- Woodwind section
- Brass section
- Keyboard section
