= Roman Grinev =

Russian jazz bassist (1976–2018)

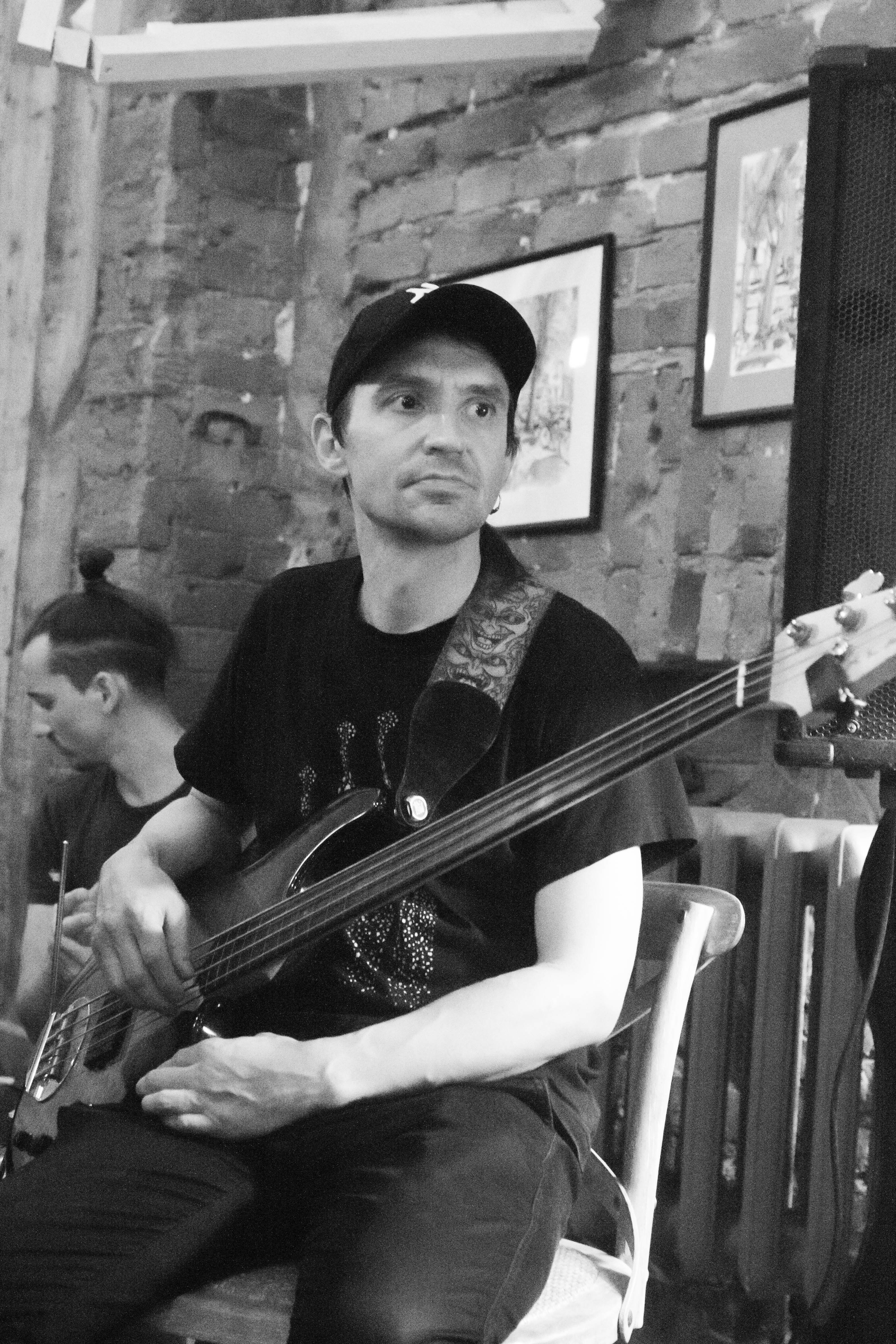

Background information
- Born: 8 December 1976; Moscow, Russian SFSR, Soviet Union
- Died: 3 November 2018 (aged 41); Moscow, Russia
- Genres: Jazz
- Occupation: Musician
- Instrument: Bass
- Labels: Victor Radzievskiy Jazz Agency
- Formerly of: FusionPort, Funk You, Wolf Mail, Black Dogs

Roman Grinev (8 December 1976 – 3 November 2018) was a Russian jazz bass player, and co-founder of the Fusion Port ensemble, in 2008 founder the label GrinStar Vibrations (2008). In December 2006, The Fusion Port ensemble was born. The group performed in clubs in Moscow and participated in the festivals Manor Jazz, Empty Hills, and Island. There are compositions by Roman Grinyov and Natalia Skvortsov, as well as original arrangements of jazz standards in the style of jazz-fusion.

Grinev died at the age of 41. According to preliminary data, he died after falling from the window of his Moscow apartment on the seventeenth floor.
