= Brass section =

Group of brass instruments in an ensemble

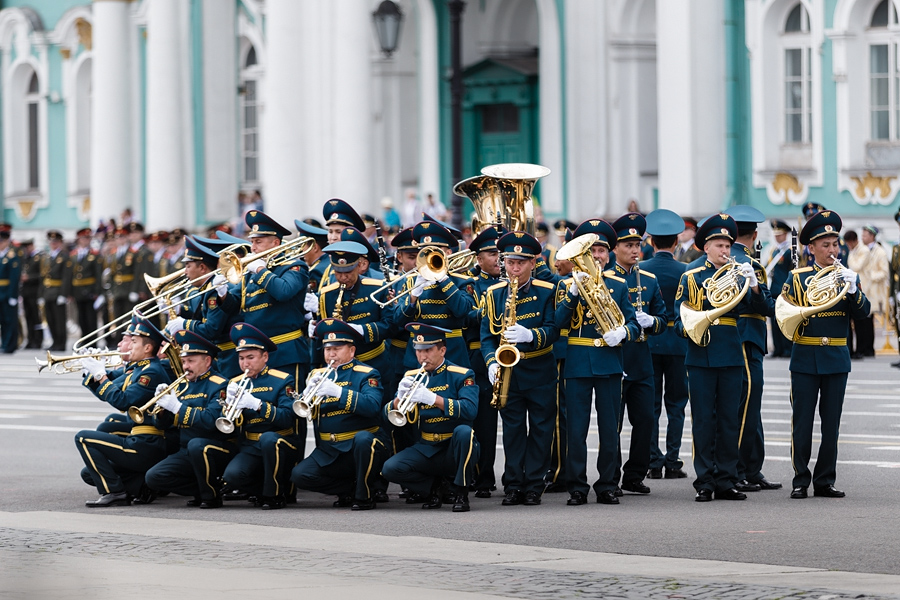
The brass section of the Band of the General Staff of the Armed Forces of Kyrgyzstan in St. Petersburg.

The brass section of the orchestra, concert band, and jazz ensemble consist of brass instruments, and is one of the main sections in all three ensembles. The British-style brass band contains only brass and percussion instruments.

They contain instruments given Hornbostel-Sachs classification 423 (brass instruments).

== Orchestra ==
The typical brass section of a modern orchestra is as follows:

- 4-8 French horns
- 2–4 Trumpets
- 2-3 Tenor trombones
- 1 Bass trombone
- 1 Tuba

Some scores may also call for a second bass trombone, and may even include a Contrabass trombone or a Cimbasso.

== Concert band ==
The brass section of the concert band is generally larger and more diverse than the brass section of the orchestra.

The typical brass section of a concert band is as follows:

- 4–6 Trumpets and/or cornets
- 4 French horns
- 2–3 Tenor trombones
- 1 Bass trombone
- 2 Euphoniums and/or baritone horns
- 2 Tubas

The brass instruments that are sometimes, but very rarely, used in the concert band:

- Flugelhorn
- Tenor (alto) Horn
- Piccolo trumpet
- Bass trumpet
- Wagner tuba
- Alto trombone
- Contrabass trombone

== Brass band ==
Groes Wen - The Trefor Brass Band
Groes-wen - A track by The Trefor Brass Band. From the 1997 album Seindorf Trefor (The Trefor Brass Band From Wales)

- 1 soprano cornet
- 10 cornets
- 1 flugelhorn
- 3 tenor (alto) horns
- 2 baritone horns
- 2 tenor trombones
- 1 bass trombone
- 2 euphoniums
- 2 E♭ tubas
- 2 B♭ tubas

== Jazz ensemble ==
The brass section of jazz ensembles usually include:

- 4 trumpets
- 3 Tenor trombones
- 1 Bass trombone

== See also ==
- Woodwind section
- String section
- Percussion section
- Keyboard section
