= Umberto Borsò =

Italian opera singer (1923–2018)

Borsò in 1956

Umberto Borsò (3 April 1923, La Spezia – 26 November 2018, Rome) was an Italian operatic tenor.

Umberto Borsò in Otello
