= Shorthand for orchestra instrumentation =

Notation for orchestra instrumentation

The shorthand for the instrumentation of a symphony orchestra (and other similar ensembles) is used to outline which and how many instruments, especially wind instruments, are called for in a given piece of music. The shorthand is ordered in the same fashion as the parts of the individual instruments in the score (when read from top to bottom).

== General approach ==
The orchestra is divided into four groups (five if a keyboard instrument is used) and specified as follows:

- Woodwind instruments: flutes, oboes, clarinets, saxophones (if one or more are needed), bassoons
- Brass instruments: horns, trumpets, trombones, tubas
- Percussion: timpani, snare drum, bass drum, chimes, etc.
- Keyboard instruments: celesta, organ, piano
- String instruments: harp, violins, violas, cellos, basses, frequently abbreviated to 'str', 'strs' or similar.

If any soloists or a choir are called for, their parts are usually printed between the percussion/keyboards and the strings in the score.

The basic order of the instruments, as seen above, is common to all of the shorthand systems. However, there is no standardized version of this shorthand; different publishers and librarians use different systems, especially for doubling/alternate/additional instruments. David Daniels, in earlier versions of his influential work that collects in print a catalog of the instrumentations of some 4,000+ pieces, made use of a shorthand for doubling/alternate/additional instruments which was less clear, but in the newer online version Daniels' approach has been refined to something more explicit, akin to the Chester Novello and Boosey & Hawkes notations below.

Examples for different notations (the instrumentation of John Adams' Harmonielehre is used here as an example):

Written out in full:	4 flutes (2,3,&4=piccolos), 3 oboes (3=English horn), 3 clarinets (3=bass clarinet), bass clarinet, 3 bassoons, contrabassoon, 4 horns, 4 trumpets, 3 trombones, 2 tubas, timpani, percussion (4 players), 2 harps, piano, celesta, strings
Chester Novello:	4(3pic)3(1ca)3(1bcl)+bcl3+cbn / 4432 / timp.4perc / 2 hp.pf.cel / str
Boosey & Hawkes:	4(II,III,IV=picc).3(III=corA).3(III=bcl).bcl.3.dbn - 4.4.3.2 - timp.perc(4):2marimbas/vib/xyl/t.bells/crot/glsp/2susp.cym/sizzle cymbal/cyms/bell tree/2tam-t/2tgl/BD - pft - cel - 2harps - strings

== Examples ==
Piece	Chester Novello	Boosey & Hawkes	Meaning
Symphony No. 25 (Mozart)	0202 / 4000 / str	0.2.0.2 - 4.0.0.0 - strings	2 oboes, 2 bassoons, 4 horns, strings
Symphony No. 5 (Beethoven)	3223 / 2230 / timp.perc / str	3.2.2.3 - 2.2.3.0 - timp - strings	3 flutes, 2 oboes, 2 clarinets, 3 bassoons, 2 horns, 2 trumpets, 3 trombones, timpani, strings
Pictures at an Exhibition (Ravel orchestration)	3(pic)3(ca)33 / 4331 / timp.5perc / 2 hp.cel / str	3(III=picc).3(III=corA).3.3 - 4.3.3.1 - timp.perc(5) - cel - 2harps - strings	3 flutes (1 doubling piccolo), 3 oboes (1 doubling English horn), 3 clarinets, 3 bassoons, 4 horns, 3 trumpets, 3 trombones, 1 tuba, timpani, 5 percussionists, celesta, 2 harps, strings
Symphony No. 1 (Mahler)	4(2pic)4(ca)4(bcl)3(cbn) / 7431 / 2timp.perc / hp / str	4(III,IV=picc).4(III=corA).4(III=bcl).3(III=dbn) - 7.4.3.1 - timp(2).perc - harp - strings	4 flutes (2 doubling piccolo), 4 oboes (1 doubling English horn), 4 clarinets (one doubling bass clarinet), 3 bassoons (one doubling contrabassoon), 7 horns, 4 trumpets, 3 trombones, 1 tuba, 2 timpanists, percussion, harp, strings
The Rite of Spring (Stravinsky)	3(1pic)+pic+afl.4(1ca)+ca.3(1bcl)+Dcl(Ebcl)+bcl.4(1cbn) / 8(2ttuba).4(1btpt)pictpt.3.2 / 2timp.4perc / str	3(III=picc).picc.afl.4(IV=corA).corA.3(III=bcl).Dcl(=Ebcl).bcl.4(IV=dbn).dbn - 8(VII,VIII=ttuba).4(IV=btpt).picctpt.3.2 - timp(2).perc(4):crot/cyms/tam - t/tgl/guiro/BD/tamb - strings	3 flutes (1 doubling piccolo), piccolo, alto flute, 4 oboes (one doubling English horn), English horn, 3 clarinets (one doubling bass clarinet), D clarinet (doubling E-flat clarinet), bass clarinet, 4 bassoons (one doubling contrabassoon), contrabassoon, 8 horns (2 doubling tenor tuba), 4 trumpets (1 doubling bass trumpet), piccolo trumpet, 3 trombones, 2 tubas, 2 timpani, 4 percussionists (crotales, cymbals, tam-tam, triangle, guiro, bass drum, tambourine), strings

An example of another approach, particularly useful where there may be extensive versatility required from doubling players, is given here for The Phantom of the Opera for a 45-part orchestra, taken from the Chester/Novello Hire Library:

- WW1(fl,pic).WW2(fl).WW3(cl).WW4(ob,ca).WW5(cl,bcl).WW6(bn)/3hn.3tpt.3tbn.tuba/2perc/hp.2kbd/str(85443 players)

== Sources ==
- Klaus Haller, Elfriede Witte (eds.): Regeln für die alphabetische Katalogisierung von Ausgaben musikalischer Werke (RAK-Musik). Leipzig 2004 (pdf; 561 kB). ISBN 3-933641-52-7 (in German)
