= Deaths in February 2017 =

The following is a list of notable deaths in February 2017.

Entries for each day are listed alphabetically by surname. A typical entry lists information in the following sequence:

- Name, age, country of citizenship at birth, subsequent country of citizenship (if applicable), reason for notability, cause of death (if known), and reference.

== February 2017 ==
=== 1 ===
- E. Ahamed, 78, Indian politician, Minister of External Affairs (2004–2014), heart attack.
- Anne Arrasmith, 70, American artist and curator.
- Keith Barber, 72, British geographer.
- Asim Basu, 81, Indian theatre director, lung infection.
- David Peter Battaglia, 86, American politician, member of the Minnesota House of Representatives (1977–1995).
- Lars-Erik Berenett, 74, Swedish actor (Jordskott, Skilda världar).
- Albano Bortoletto Cavallin, 86, Brazilian Roman Catholic prelate, Bishop of Guarapuava (1986–1992) and Archbishop of Londrina (1992–2006), surgical complications.
- Mark Brownson, 41, American baseball player (Colorado Rockies).
- Desmond Carrington, 90, British actor (Emergency – Ward 10) and broadcaster.
- Robert Dahlqvist, 40, Swedish rock singer and guitarist (The Hellacopters, Dundertåget), drowning as a result of a seizure.
- Constantin Dinulescu, 85, Romanian footballer (AS Progresul București).
- John Fuhr, 88, American politician.
- Sandy Gandhi, 59, Indian-born Australian comedian.
- Stig Grybe, 88, Swedish actor (Charlie Strapp and Froggy Ball Flying High).
- Cor van der Hoeven, 95, Dutch footballer (Ajax).
- William Melvin Kelley, 79, American novelist, complications from kidney failure.
- Basilio Lami Dozo, 88, Argentine military officer.
- Carter Manny, 98, American architect.
- Sir Ken Morrison, 85, British businessman, president of Morrisons.
- Oskar A. Munch, 88, Norwegian businessman (ABB Group).
- Bernardine Portenski, 67, New Zealand long-distance runner, ovarian cancer.
- Alma Redlinger, 92, Romanian painter.
- Edward Tipper, 95, American World War II veteran (Easy Company), depicted in Band of Brothers.
- Étienne Tshisekedi, 84, Congolese politician, Prime Minister (1991, 1992–1993, 1997), pulmonary embolism.
- Antoon Verschoot, 91, Belgian bugler.
- Esther K. Walling, 76, American politician, member of the Wisconsin State Assembly (1983–1989), cancer.
- A. N. Yiannopoulos, 88, Greek-born American legal academic.

=== 2 ===
- Gordon Aikman, 31, British ALS campaigner, amyotrophic lateral sclerosis.
- José Antonio Alonso, 56, Spanish politician, Minister of the Interior (2004–2006) and Defence (2006–2008), lung cancer.
- Alvin Baldus, 90, American politician, member of the U.S. House of Representatives from Wisconsin's 3rd congressional district (1975–1981) and the Wisconsin State Assembly (1966–1975, 1989–1997).
- Atsuko Betchaku, 56, Japanese pacifist and educator.
- Angelo Bissessarsingh, 34, Trinidadian historian and author, pancreatic cancer.
- William J. Campbell, 85, American lieutenant general.
- Tom Drake, 86, American wrestler and politician, member of the Alabama House of Representatives (1960–1992), Speaker (1983–1987).
- John Hilton, 74, American football player (Pittsburgh Steelers, Detroit Lions), fall.
- Bertram Kostant, 88, American mathematician.
- Max Lüscher, 93, Swiss psychotherapist.
- George Maderos, 83, American football player (San Francisco 49ers).
- Predrag Matvejević, 84, Bosnian-Croatian writer and literature professor.
- Peter McArthur, 79, Australian politician, member of the Victorian Legislative Assembly for Ringwood (1976–1982).
- Perry McGriff, 79, American football player and politician, member of the Florida House of Representatives (2000–2002).
- Shunichiro Okano, 85, Japanese football player, manager (national team) and sports executive, lung cancer.
- Miltos Papapostolou, 81, Greek football player and manager (AEK Athens, national team).
- Ruan Posheng, 100, Chinese politician, member of the National People's Congress (1979–1988).
- Jeff Sauer, 73, American ice hockey coach (Wisconsin Badgers), pancreatic cancer.
- Seymour Jonathan Singer, 92, American cell biologist.
- Su Hongjun, 76, Chinese astronomer.
- Gonzalo Taboada, 88, Spanish Olympic bobsledder (1956).

=== 3 ===
- Dritëro Agolli, 85, Albanian writer, pulmonary disease.
- Zoya Bulgakova, 102, Russian actress.
- Donald Campbell, 90, American sprinter.
- Earl H. Carroll, 91, American federal judge, U.S. District Court for the District of Arizona (1980–1994).
- Carmelo Cassati, 92, Italian Roman Catholic prelate, Archbishop of Trani-Barletta-Bisceglie (1990–1999).
- Marjorie Corcoran, 66, American particle physicist, traffic collision.
- Anthony French, 96, British-American physicist, contributor to the Manhattan Project.
- Joseph Green, 82, American academic and theatre producer.
- Joe Grima, 80, Maltese politician and broadcaster (Radio Malta).
- Yoshiro Hayashi, 89, Japanese politician, Minister of Finance (1992–1993), multiple organ failure.
- John M. Hayes, 76, American geochemist, pulmonary fibrosis.
- Roy Heenan, 81, Canadian lawyer and academic, founder of Heenan Blaikie.
- Colin Hutton, 90, English rugby league player (Widnes, Hull F.C.), manager and executive (Hull Kingston Rovers).
- Hassan Joharchi, 48, Iranian actor, liver disease.
- Marisa Letícia Lula da Silva, 66, Brazilian trade unionist, First Lady (2003–2010), stroke.
- Richard Lyon, 93, American admiral and politician, Mayor of Oceanside, California (1992–2000).
- Francis X. Mahoney, 94, American politician.
- Shumon Miura, 91, Japanese Third Generation author, pneumonia.
- Benny Perrin, 57, American football player (St. Louis Cardinals), suicide by gunshot.
- Qin Huasun, 81, Chinese diplomat, Permanent Representative of China to the United Nations (1995-2000).
- Lou Rowan, 91, Australian Test cricket umpire.
- Lorenzo Servitje, 98, Mexican businessman and philanthropist, co-founder of Grupo Bimbo.
- Martin Gotthard Schneider, 86, German theologian, cantor and church music composer.
- Bob Stewart, 66, Canadian ice hockey player (California Golden Seals, St. Louis Blues).
- Don Trousdell, 79, American artist.
- John Waggener, 91, American major general.
- Michael Whinney, 86, British Anglican prelate, Bishop of Southwell (1985–1988).

=== 4 ===
- Neil Betts, 90, Australian rugby union player (Queensland, Wallabies).
- Antonio Casale, 84, Italian actor (The Good, the Bad and the Ugly, Le salamandre).
- Dewey Crump, 70, American politician.
- García de Andoin, 83, Spanish football player and manager.
- Gervase de Peyer, 90, British clarinetist.
- John Dickson, 72, New Zealand poet.
- John Gay, 92, American screenwriter (Run Silent, Run Deep, Separate Tables).
- Basil Hetzel, 94, Australian medical researcher, iodine deficiency campaigner.
- Hans van der Hoek, 83, Dutch footballer (Feyenoord).
- John Howes, 92, American professor of Asian studies.
- Steve Lang, 67, Canadian bass guitarist (April Wine), complications from Parkinson's disease.
- Margaret Mungherera, 59, Ugandan physician, President of the World Medical Association (2013–2014), cancer.
- Sir Kenneth Newman, 90, British police officer, Commissioner of the Metropolitan Police (1982–1987).
- Ivor Noël Hume, 89, British archaeologist (Wolstenholme Towne).
- David Phillips, 60, American cinematographer (The Basketball Diaries, Saturday Night Live).
- Tim Piazza, 19, American student, injuries sustained in a hazing.
- Bano Qudsia, 88, Pakistani writer (Raja Gidh).
- Noel Simms, 82, Jamaican reggae percussionist and singer, lung cancer.
- Marc Spitz, 47, American writer (We Got the Neutron Bomb, Bowie: A Biography) and music journalist (Spin).
- Georgy Taratorkin, 72, Russian stage and film actor.
- Yang Shiming, 92, Chinese thermodynamicist.

=== 5 ===
- Irma Adelman, 86, Romanian-born American economist.
- Rahila Al Riyami, Omani politician.
- García de Andoin, 83, Spanish football player and manager (Espanyol).
- David Axelrod, 85, American arranger, composer and producer, lung cancer.
- Ron Billingsley, 71, American football player (San Diego Chargers, Houston Oilers).
- Ray Christensen, 92, American sportscaster (WCCO), upper respiratory infection.
- Betty Collette, 86, American veterinary pathologist.
- Glen Dudbridge, 78–79, British sinologist.
- Sonny Geraci, 70, American singer (The Outsiders, Climax).
- Gila Goldstein, 69, Italian-born Israeli actress, singer and transgender rights activist, stroke.
- Luis Gómez-Montejano, 94, Spanish football executive, President of Real Madrid (2006).
- Björn Granath, 70, Swedish actor (Madicken, Pelle the Conqueror, The American).
- Carroll Izard, 93, American psychologist.
- Kálmán Katona, 69, Hungarian politician.
- Thomas Lux, 70, American poet, lung cancer.
- Gopalkrishna P. Nayak, 89, Indian writer.
- James Sankowski, 67, American ceramic artist.
- Suranjit Sengupta, 71, Bangladeshi politician, MP (since 1979).
- Harry Sullivan, 84, Australian VFL footballer (Carlton, Collingwood).

=== 6 ===
- Ivar Aronsson, 88, Swedish rower, Olympic silver medalist (1956).
- Boy Asistio, 80, Filipino politician, Mayor of Caloocan (1980–1986, 1988–1995).
- Len Bosman, 93, Australian politician, member of the Australian House of Representatives for St George (1963–1969).
- Bill Britton, 82, Canadian football player (BC Lions, Calgary Stampeders).
- Irwin Corey, 102, American comedian (The Steve Allen Show) and actor.
- David Culver, 92, Canadian businessman (Alcan).
- Christine Dolce, 35, American model, liver failure.
- Marc Drogin, 80, American writer and illustrator.
- Raymond Clare Edwards, 96, Canadian politician.
- José Gea Escolano, 87, Spanish Roman Catholic prelate, Bishop of Ibiza (1976–1987) and Mondoñedo-Ferrol (1987–2005).
- Neil Gehrels, 64, American astronomer, pancreatic cancer.
- Stan Jones, 67, American politician, member of the Indiana House of Representatives (1974–1990).
- Inge Keller, 93, German actress (The Last Year, Aimée & Jaguar, Lola and Billy the Kid).
- Djelloul Khatib, 80, Algerian independence activist and politician.
- Mary Ann Knowles, 70, American politician, member of the New Hampshire House of Representatives, cancer.
- Alec McCowen, 91, English actor (A Night to Remember, Frenzy, Gangs of New York).
- Frances Prince, 79, American politician.
- Ted Proud, 86, British postal historian.
- Vacys Reimeris, 95, Lithuanian poet.
- Luis Santamarina, 74, Spanish Olympic bicycle racer (1964) .
- Roy Forge Smith, 87, British production designer (Monty Python and the Holy Grail, Ghost Whisperer, Teenage Mutant Ninja Turtles).
- Raymond Smullyan, 97, American mathematician and philosopher.
- Deborah Lynn Steinberg, 55, American-British academic, author, educator and sociologist, breast cancer.
- Albert Stubblebine, 87, American major general.
- Roger Walkowiak, 89, French racing cyclist, Tour de France winner (1956).
- Joost van der Westhuizen, 45, South African rugby union player (Bulls, Blue Bulls, national team), motor neuron disease.
- Ritchie Yorke, 73, Australian music journalist, chronic obstructive pulmonary disease.

=== 7 ===
- Svend Asmussen, 100, Danish jazz violinist.
- Matt Baker, 61, American horse trainer and jockey.
- Pat Beard, 69, American politician, member of the Minnesota House of Representatives (1983–1994), complications from exposure to Agent Orange.
- Sam Blackwell, 86, American politician.
- Valeriu Bularca, 85, Romanian wrestler, Olympic silver medalist (1964).
- Andrew Davison, 37, American football player (New York Jets, Dallas Cowboys).
- Sotsha Dlamini, 76, Swazi politician, Prime Minister (1986–1989), fall.
- Smail Hamdani, 86, Algerian politician, Prime Minister (1998–1999).
- Richard Hatch, 71, American actor (Battlestar Galactica, The Streets of San Francisco, All My Children), pancreatic cancer.
- Michael Henshall, 88, British Anglican prelate, Bishop of Warrington (1976–1996).
- Huang Mulan, 110, Chinese secret agent.
- Loukianos Kilaidonis, 73, Greek singer-songwriter, respiratory infection.
- Martti Laitinen, 87, Finnish footballer.
- Sidney H. Liebson, 96, American scientist.
- Luis Alberto Luna Tobar, 93, Ecuadorian Roman Catholic prelate, Archbishop of Cuenca (1981–2000).
- Norah McClintock, 59, Canadian author, ovarian cancer.
- Miho Nakayama, 78, Japanese comedian.
- Nilawan Pintong, 101, Thai writer.
- Gianfranco Plenizio, 76, Italian composer and conductor (Hotel Rwanda).
- Antonín Přidal, 81, Czech writer and translator.
- Hans Rosling, 68, Swedish academic, professor of International Health and co-founder of the Gapminder Foundation, pancreatic cancer.
- John Salt, 75, British Anglican bishop, Diocese of St Helena (1999–2011).
- Tzvetan Todorov, 77, Bulgarian-French philosopher.
- Richard B. Wright, 79, Canadian novelist (Clara Callan).

=== 8 ===
- Ljubiša Beara, 77, Bosnian military officer and convicted war criminal.
- Timothy Behrens, 79, British painter.
- Claudia Belk, 79, American judge and lawyer.
- Don Busath, 86, American photographer.
- Alvin C. Bush, 93, American politician.
- Viktor Chanov, 57, Ukrainian footballer, beaten.
- Richard DuFour, 69, American educational researcher, cancer.
- Georges El-Murr, 86, Lebanese-born Jordanian Melkite Catholic hierarch, Archbishop of Petra and Philadelphia (1992–2007) and Patriarchal Exarch of Iraq (1997–2004).
- Giorgio Giacomelli, 87, Italian diplomat.
- Kjell Heggelund, 84, Norwegian writer and editor.
- Arthur Hyman, 95, American academic.
- Sir Elihu Lauterpacht, 88, British lawyer.
- Sir Peter Mansfield, 83, English physicist, laureate of the Nobel Prize in Physiology or Medicine (2003).
- Rina Matsuno, 18, Japanese pop singer (Shiritsu Ebisu Chugaku), lethal arrhythmia.
- Brendan McGahon, 80, Irish politician, TD (1982–2002).
- Patrick Mumbure Mutume, 73, Zimbabwean Roman Catholic prelate, Auxiliary Bishop of Mutare (since 1979).
- Mohamud Muse Hersi, Somali politician, 79–80, President of Puntland (2005–2009).
- Ray Newman, 94, American football coach.
- Ólöf Nordal, 50, Icelandic politician, Minister of the Interior (2014–2017), cancer.
- Tara Palmer-Tomkinson, 45, British socialite and television presenter, perforated ulcer and peritonitis.
- José Luis Pérez de Arteaga, 66, Spanish music critic, musicologist and journalist.
- Eileen Ramsay, 101, British photographer.
- Tom Raworth, 78, British poet and publisher.
- Tony Särkkä, 44, Swedish multi-instrumentalist (Abruptum, Ophthalamia).
- Alan Simpson, 87, British comedy scriptwriter (Hancock's Half Hour, Comedy Playhouse, Steptoe and Son), lung disease.
- Steve Sumner, 61, English-born New Zealand footballer (Christchurch United, Manurewa, national team), prostate cancer.
- Mikhail Tolstykh, 36, Ukrainian DPR separatist commander (War in Donbas), rocket launcher explosion.
- Yoshio Tsuchiya, 89, Japanese actor (Seven Samurai, The Human Vapor, Funeral Parade of Roses).
- Jan Vansina, 87, Belgian historian and professor (University of Wisconsin–Madison).
- Sir John Wells, 91, British politician, MP (1959–1987), complications from a fall.

=== 9 ===
- Serge Baguet, 47, Belgian racing cyclist, colon cancer.
- Walter Brasch, 71, American journalist.
- Joanne Brekke, 81, American politician, member of the Washington House of Representatives (1978–1993).
- Donald Leslie Brothers, 93, Canadian politician, member of the Legislative Assembly of British Columbia (1958–1972).
- Chen Hsing-ling, 92, Taiwanese military officer, head of the Air Force and Armed Forces.
- Marcel Dandeneau, 85, American politician, member of the Wisconsin State Assembly (1975–1979), cancer.
- Radu Gabrea, 79, Romanian film director (Călătoria lui Gruber) and screenwriter.
- Claude Geffré, 91, French Roman Catholic theologian.
- Barbara Gelb, 91, American biographer, playwright and journalist.
- Kenneth Harrap, 85, British biochemist.
- Piet Keizer, 73, Dutch footballer (Ajax, national team), lung cancer.
- Josefina Leiner, 88, Mexican actress.
- Božena Moserová, 90, Czech Olympic alpine skier.
- Packy, 54, American-born Asian elephant, euthanized.
- Simon Porter, 66, English cricket player and administrator (Oxfordshire).
- André Salvat, 96, French Army colonel.
- Warren Unna, 93, American journalist (The Washington Post), congestive heart failure.
- William Uttal, 90, American psychologist and engineer.

=== 10 ===
- Wiesław Adamski, 69, Polish sculptor, stroke.
- Roger Boas, 95, American politician, chief administrative officer of San Francisco (1977–1986).
- Albert Boscov, 87, American businessman (Boscov's), pancreatic cancer.
- Edward Bryant, 71, American science fiction and horror writer.
- Miles Cahn, 95, American businessman, co-founder of Coach, Inc.
- H. R. Crawford, 78, American real estate developer and politician, prostate cancer.
- Robert K. Dodge, 88, American politician.
- Peter Farrer, 90, English author and cross-dresser.
- Maxine Grimm, 102, American religious figure (Latter-day Saints).
- Larry Hickman, 81, American football player (Hamilton Tiger-Cats, Green Bay Packers).
- Max Hooper, 82, English naturalist.
- Mike Ilitch, 87, American businessman (Little Caesars, Detroit Red Wings, Detroit Tigers).
- Dahlov Ipcar, 99, American painter and author.
- Piet Keizer, 73, Dutch footballer (AFC Ajax).
- Ben Martin, 86, American photographer, complications from pulmonary fibrosis.
- Hal Moore, 94, American lieutenant general and author (We Were Soldiers Once... And Young).
- Yuriy Poyarkov, 80, Ukrainian volleyball player, Olympic champion (1964, 1968).
- Royal Delta, 9, American racehorse, foaling complications.
- James E. Service, 86, American vice admiral.
- John Simpson, 84, American police official, President of Interpol (1984–1988).
- Irwin Stambler, 92, American writer.
- Bob Sweetan, 76, Canadian professional wrestler.
- Charles Truman, 67, British art historian.
- Wang Lin, 64, Chinese qigong master, multiple organ failure.
- Tsuyoshi Yamanaka, 78, Japanese swimmer, Olympic silver medalist (1956, 1960), pneumonia.

=== 11 ===
- Danièle Djamila Amrane-Minne, 77, French-Algerian political activist, academic and writer.
- Bruno A. Boley, 92, Italian-born American engineer.
- Joe Bonnar, 68, English rugby league player.
- Trish Doan, 31, South Korean-Canadian bass guitarist (Kittie).
- Jeremy Geathers, 30, American arena football player (Spokane Shock, Orlando Predators), traffic collision.
- Chavo Guerrero Sr., 68, American professional wrestler (NWA, AWA, WWE), liver cancer.
- Eivind Hjelmtveit, 90, Norwegian cultural administrator (Riksteatret, Oslo Kino).
- Knut Kleve, 90, Norwegian philologist.
- Vasily Kudinov, 47, Russian handball player, Olympic champion (1992, 2000).
- Allan Juel Larsen, 85, Danish Olympic cyclist.
- Howard Leeds, 97, Canadian-born American television producer and writer (The Brady Bunch, Silver Spoons, Diff'rent Strokes).
- Harvey Lichtenstein, 87, American arts administrator (Brooklyn Academy of Music), complications from a stroke.
- Kurt Marti, 96, Swiss poet and theologian.
- Fab Melo, 26, Brazilian basketball player (Boston Celtics).
- M. Mike Miller, 87, American travel writer and politician, member of the Alaska House of Representatives (1971–1987).
- Gregg Northington, 68, American basketball player.
- Piet Rentmeester, 78, Dutch racing cyclist.
- Jaap Rijks, 97, Dutch Olympic equestrian (1948).
- Amanda Rudd, 93, American librarian.
- Jarmila Šuláková, 87, Czech folk singer.
- Jiro Taniguchi, 69, Japanese manga artist (A Distant Neighborhood).
- Juan Ulloa, 82, Costa Rican footballer (Alajuelense, national team).
- Jozef Zlatňanský, 89, Slovak Roman Catholic prelate, Titular Bishop of Mons Faliscus (since 1997) and Secretary of ICCEE (1997–2004).
- Joseph Zoundeiko, c.46-48, Central African warlord, airstrike.

=== 12 ===
- Dave Adolph, 79, American football coach (Cleveland Browns, San Diego Chargers, Los Angeles Raiders), cancer.
- Ákos Ajtony, 72, Hungarian Olympic fencer.
- Sam Arday, 71, Ghanaian football coach (national team).
- Herminio Bautista, 82, Filipino actor and director (Bagets), member of Quezon City Council (1988–1991).
- Jay Bontatibus, 52, American actor (The Young and the Restless, General Hospital), cancer.
- Stacy Bromberg, 60, American woman darts player, world champion (2010), cancer.
- Barbara Carroll, 92, American jazz pianist.
- Sara Coward, 69, British actress (The Archers), breast cancer.
- Damian, 52, British pop singer, cancer.
- Nancy Diamond, 75, Canadian politician, Mayor of Oshawa, Ontario (1991–2003).
- Åsleik Engmark, 51, Norwegian actor and comedian.
- Héctor Fautario, 92, Argentine Air Force officer.
- Michel Harvey, 80, Canadian ice hockey player (Hershey Bears, Quebec Nordiques).
- Al Jarreau, 76, American jazz and R&B singer ("Moonlighting", "Since I Fell for You", "We Are the World"), seven-time Grammy winner, respiratory failure.
- Hamida Khuhro, 80, Pakistani politician, writer, professor and historian.
- Sione Lauaki, 35, Tongan-born New Zealand rugby union player (Chiefs, New Zealand national team), kidney failure.
- Yitzhak Livni, 82, Israeli media executive and writer.
- Alice Ludes, 104, American singer.
- Albert Malbois, 101, French Roman Catholic prelate, Bishop of Évry-Corbeil-Essonnes (1966–1977).
- Anna Marguerite McCann, 83, American archaeologist and art historian.
- Quentin Moses, 33, American football player (Miami Dolphins, Arizona Cardinals), house fire.
- Bobby Murdoch, 81, English footballer (Liverpool).
- Giusto Pio, 91, Italian violinist and songwriter ("I treni di Tozeur").
- Ren Xinmin, 101, Chinese rocket scientist.
- Clint Roberts, 82, American politician, member of the U.S. House of Representatives from South Dakota's 2nd congressional district (1981–1983), COPD.
- David Seals, 69, American author and screenwriter (Powwow Highway).
- Krystyna Sienkiewicz, 81, Polish actress and singer.
- Philip Sorensen, 83, American politician.

=== 13 ===
- Ricardo Arias Calderón, 83, Panamanian politician, vice president (1990–1992).
- Aage Birch, 90, Danish sailor, Olympic silver medalist (1968).
- Edward E. David Jr., 92, American electrical engineer, Director of the White House Office of Science and Technology (1970–1973).
- Melvin Defleur, 93, American mass communications scholar.
- Harold Denton, 80, American public servant, Director of the Office of Nuclear Reactor Regulation.
- Raymond Dugrand, 92, French geographer.
- E-Dubble, 34, American rap artist, infection.
- Mostafa El-Abbadi, 88, Egyptian historian, heart failure.
- Fame and Glory, 11, Irish racehorse, winner of the Irish Derby and Ascot Gold Cup, heart attack.
- Paulo Henrique Filho, 52, Brazilian footballer.
- Richard Gebhardt, 85, American politician.
- Jan Grabowski, 66, Polish speedway rider.
- Aileen Hernandez, 90, American union organizer and women's rights activist, President of the National Organization for Women (1970–1971).
- Gerald Hirschfeld, 95, American cinematographer (Young Frankenstein, Fail Safe).
- Giorgos Ioannou, 90, Greek artist.
- Kim Jong-nam, 45, North Korean political figure, member of Kim dynasty, poisoned.
- Bruce Lansbury, 87, British-American television producer (Murder, She Wrote, The Wild Wild West, Knight Rider) and screenwriter, complications from Alzheimer's disease.
- Carol Lloyd, 68, Australian singer, complications from COPD.
- Lucky Pulpit, 16, American racehorse, heart attack.
- John Rote, 88, American field hockey player.
- J. Glenn Schneider, 81, American educator and politician.
- Salma Siddiqui, 85, Indian novelist.
- Darrell K. Smith, 55, American football player (Toronto Argonauts), cancer.
- Momo Wandel Soumah, 39, Guinean footballer, heart attack.
- Seijun Suzuki, 93, Japanese director and screenwriter.
- Robin Tamplin, 88-89, Irish Olympic rower.
- Odd Tandberg, 92, Norwegian painter.
- Satya Pal Wahi, 88, Indian corporate executive (Oil and Natural Gas Corporation).
- Jim Watson, 73, New Zealand biotechnologist.
- Rebecca Welles, 89, American actress.

=== 14 ===
- Anne Aaserud, 74, Norwegian art historian.
- Mikhail Agranovich, 86, Russian mathematician.
- B. B. Bhattacharya, 71, Indian economist and professor, cardiac arrest.
- Cipriano Chemello, 71, Italian racing cyclist, Olympic bronze medalist (1968).
- Adrien Duvillard, 82, French Olympic skier (1956, 1960).
- Siegfried Herrmann, 84, German Olympic long-distance runner (1956, 1964).
- Ríkharður Jónsson, 87, Icelandic footballer.
- Jiří Lanský, 83, Czech Olympic high jumper (1960), European championship silver medalist (1954, 1958).
- Elisabeth Lichtenberger, 91, Austrian geographer.
- Molly Mahood, 97, British literary scholar.
- Joseph Neal, 66, American politician, member of the South Carolina House of Representatives (since 1993).
- Paul Nguyên Van Hòa, 85, Vietnamese Roman Catholic prelate, Bishop of Phan Thiết (1975) and Nha Trang (1975–2009).
- Deanna Summers, 76, American songwriter ("Goodbye Priscilla (Bye Bye Baby Blue)").
- Jim Swan, 75, Scottish chemist and whisky expert.
- Hans Trass, 88, Estonian botanist.
- Casimir Wang Mi-lu, 74, Chinese clandestine Roman Catholic prelate, Bishop of Qinzhou (1981–2003).
- John Watkinson, 84, New Zealand soil chemist.
- George Herbert Weiss, 86, American mathematician.
- Walter Wheeler, 91, American politician.

=== 15 ===
- Gretchen Garner, 77, American art historian and curator.
- Rich Ingold, 53, American arena football player and coach (Washington Commandos, Quad City Steamwheelers, Wilkes-Barre/Scranton Pioneers).
- Manfred Kaiser, 88, German football player and manager (Wismut Gera).
- Margareta Kjellin, 68, Swedish politician, MP (since 2006), lung cancer.
- Olavi Luoto, 90, Finnish Olympian.
- Stuart McLean, 68, Canadian radio broadcaster (The Vinyl Cafe), melanoma.
- Michèle McQuigg, 69, American politician, member of the Virginia House of Delegates (1998–2008).
- Silvana Pierucci, 87, Italian Olympic long jumper.
- Roy Proverbs, 84, English footballer (Gillingham).
- Gelek Rimpoche, 77, Tibetan-born American Buddhist teacher.
- José Solé, 87, Mexican stage actor and director.
- Tadeusz Swietochowski, 84, Polish-American historian.
- Loren Wiseman, 65, American game designer (Game Designers' Workshop), heart attack.

=== 16 ===
- Cordelia Agbebaku, 55, Nigerian academic administrator.
- Josef Augusta, 70, Czech ice hockey player and coach, Olympic silver medalist (1976), pancreatic cancer.
- William Beck, 87, American Olympic skier.
- Dick Bruna, 89, Dutch author and illustrator (Miffy).
- Les Cocker, 77, English footballer (Wolverhampton).
- Teresa del Conde, 82, Mexican art historian and critic.
- Norman Thomas di Giovanni, 83, American editor and translator.
- Ross Greenberg, 60, American journalist and antivirus pioneer, pneumonia and multiple sclerosis.
- Bengt Gustavsson, 89, Swedish football player and manager.
- Hamish Hardie, 88, British Olympic sailor.
- Isahak Isahakyan, 83, Armenian banker, chairman of the Central Bank (1986–1994).
- Jannis Kounellis, 80, Greek-Italian artist.
- Elsa Marston, 83, American author.
- Osmond P. Martin, 86, Belizean Roman Catholic Prelate, Bishop of Belize City-Belmopan (1983–2006).
- Jack Mulrooney, 82, Australian rules footballer (St Kilda).
- Dimitris Mytaras, 83, Greek painter.
- Pericoma Okoye, 81–82, Nigerian singer.
- Ali Osman, 58–59, Sudanese composer and conductor.
- Richard Pankhurst, 89, British academic.
- Peter Richardson, 85, English cricketer (Worcestershire, Kent, national team).
- Krishnaraj Sriram, 43, Indian cricketer, cardiac arrest.
- George Steele, 79, American professional wrestler (WWF) and actor (Ed Wood), renal failure.
- Jerome Tuccille, 80, American writer and activist.
- Wang Ben-hu, 63, Taiwanese television presenter, cancer.
- Duke Washington, 83, American football player (Philadelphia Eagles), pneumonia.
- Ep Wieldraaijer, 89, Dutch politician, member of House of Representatives (1963–1974).

=== 17 ===
- Alan Aldridge, 73, British graphic designer (The Who, Elton John).
- Ernest Ambler, 93, British-American physicist.
- Charles L. Bartlett, 95, American journalist (Chattanooga Times), Pulitzer Prize winner (1956), heart ailment.
- Evangelos Basiakos, 63, Greek politician, MP (since 1989), heart attack.
- Nicole Bass, 52, American bodybuilder and professional wrestler (WWF, ECW, XPW), stroke.
- Peter Belt, 87, British inventor.
- David Braine, 76, British philosopher.
- Helmut Brenner, 60, Austrian musicologist.
- P. Michael Conneally, 85, American geneticist.
- Lars Engberg, 74, Danish politician, Lord Mayor of Copenhagen (2004–2005).
- Tore Eriksson, 79, Swedish biathlete, Olympic bronze medalist (1968).
- Just Faaland, 95, Norwegian economist.
- Warren Frost, 91, American actor (Twin Peaks, Matlock, Seinfeld).
- Börge Hellström, 59, Swedish writer (Roslund/Hellström), cancer.
- Tomislav Ivančić, 78, Croatian Roman Catholic theologian and academic.
- Cecil J. Kempf, 89, American military officer, Chief of United States Navy Reserve (1983–1987).
- Emmanuelle Khanh, 79, French stylist and fashion designer, pancreatic cancer.
- Kim Ji-young, 78, South Korean actress (Silenced, Arahan, Too Beautiful to Lie).
- Louis Quatorze, 24, American thoroughbred racehorse and sire, heart attack.
- Theodore J. Lowi, 85, American political scientist.
- Robert H. Michel, 93, American politician, U.S Representative from Illinois's 18th district (1957–1995), pneumonia.
- Leonard Myers, 38, American football player (New England Patriots), cancer.
- Isarapong Noonpakdee, 83, Thai army officer, Commander of the Royal Thai Army (1992).
- Michael Novak, 83, American Roman Catholic theologian, complications from colon cancer.
- Russ Prior, 67, Canadian Olympic weightlifter (1976), world championship bronze medalist (1976).
- Tom Regan, 78, American philosopher and animal rights advocate, pneumonia.
- Andrew Schneider, 74, American journalist (Pittsburgh Press, Seattle Post-Intelligencer), Pulitzer Prize winner (1986, 1987), heart failure.
- Doris Seale, 80, American librarian and poet.
- Hank Searls, 94, American author and screenwriter.
- Ved Prakash Sharma, 61, Indian writer, lung cancer.
- Peter Skellern, 69, English singer-songwriter, brain cancer.
- Niki Stajković, 57, Austrian Olympic diver (1972, 1976, 1980, 1988, 1992), European championship silver medalist (1987), heart failure.
- James Stevenson, 87, American illustrator and author.
- Su Qiang, 85, Chinese inorganic chemist.
- Thomas Sweeney, 87, Australian rugby union player.
- Michael Tuchner, 82, British film and theatre director.
- Marko Veselica, 81, Croatian politician, economist and convicted dissident.
- Tony Vinson, 81, Australian social scientist.
- Sir Nicholas Wall, 71, English judge, President of the Family Division (2010–2012).
- Magnus Wenninger, 97, American mathematician and author.

=== 18 ===
- Omar Abdel-Rahman, 78, Egyptian Muslim leader and convicted terrorist.
- Victor Arbekov, 74, Russian motocross racer, world champion (1965).
- Kelvin Belcher, 55, American tennis player.
- Jambuwantrao Dhote, 77, Indian politician, cardiac arrest.
- Nick Dupree, 34, American disability rights activist, sepsis and cardiac failure.
- Lyla Elliott, 82, Australian politician, member of the Western Australian Legislative Council (1971–1986), cancer.
- Hiram Fong Jr., 77, American politician.
- Frank Gotch, 90, American physician.
- Gene Hatfield, 91, American artist.
- Roger Hynd, 75, Scottish football player (Rangers, Birmingham City) and manager (Motherwell).
- Kris Kaspersky, 40, Russian computer security researcher, injuries sustained in skydiving accident.
- Ivan Koloff, 74, Canadian professional wrestler (WWF, NWA), liver cancer.
- Erland Kops, 80, Danish badminton player, European championship silver medalist (1970).
- Tom Larson, 69, American politician, member of the Wisconsin State Assembly (2011–2016), lung cancer.
- Norma McCorvey, 69, American political activist, plaintiff in U.S. Supreme Court case Roe v. Wade.
- Henk Nienhuis, 75, Dutch football player and manager (Veendam).
- Sir Michael Ogio, 74, Papua New Guinean politician, Governor-General (since 2010).
- Nadezhda Olizarenko, 63, Ukrainian track athlete, Olympic champion (1980).
- Samuel Poyntz, 90, Irish prelate, Bishop of Connor (1987–1995).
- John Ross, 90, Austrian-born American chemist.
- Richard Schickel, 84, American film critic (Time), complications from a series of strokes.
- Lawrence F. Snowden, 95, American military officer.
- Pasquale Squitieri, 78, Italian film director and screenwriter (Gang War in Naples, Father of the Godfathers, Il prefetto di ferro).
- Clyde Stubblefield, 73, American drummer (James Brown), kidney failure.
- Sulamani, 17, Irish racehorse, euthanized.
- Alan Thompson, 92, British academic and politician, MP for Dunfermline Burghs (1959–1964).
- Peggy Tiger, 74, American Cherokee Nation author and art gallery owner.
- Dan Vickerman, 37, South African-born Australian rugby union footballer (Brumbies, Waratahs, national team), suicide.
- Carmen Delgado Votaw, 81, Puerto Rican civil rights activist.

=== 19 ===
- Bjarne Arentz, 88, Norwegian Olympic alpine skier.
- Alejandro Atchugarry, 64, Uruguayan lawyer and politician, Minister of Economy and Finance (2002–2003), aneurysm.
- Shibaji Banerjee, 60s, Indian footballer (Mohun Bagan), heart attack.
- Xavier Beulin, 58, French agribusiness executive (Avril), heart attack.
- Charismatic, 20, American racehorse, winner of the 1999 Kentucky Derby and the 1999 Preakness Stakes, pelvic hemorrhage.
- Richard J. Coffee, 92, American politician, Chairman of the New Jersey Democratic State Committee (1977–1981).
- Larry Coryell, 73, American jazz guitarist, heart failure.
- Don Dixon, Baron Dixon, 87, British politician, MP for Jarrow (1979–1997).
- Dean Ehlers, 87, American college basketball coach (Memphis, James Madison).
- Kaci Kullmann Five, 65, Norwegian politician, Storting (1981–1997) and Chairwoman of the Norwegian Nobel Committee (since 2015), breast cancer.
- Anthony Forbes, 79, British stockbroker (Cazenove).
- Karla M. Gray, 69, American state judge, Associate Justice (1991–2000) and Chief Justice (2001–2008) of the Montana Supreme Court, cancer.
- Darryl Hammond, 49, American arena football player (St. Louis Stampede, Nashville Kats, Georgia Force), amyotrophic lateral sclerosis.
- Kyoko Hayashi, 86, Japanese author.
- Altamas Kabir, 68, Indian judge, Chief Justice (2012–2013).
- Hillar Kärner, 81, Estonian chess player.
- Jørgen Kieler, 97, Danish physician and World War II resistance member.
- Maggie Lunn, 56, English casting director (Robin Hood, Notes on a Scandal, Cranford), cancer.
- Harry MacPherson, 90, American baseball player (Boston Braves).
- Halaevalu Mataʻaho ʻAhomeʻe, 90, Tongan royal, Queen Consort (1965–2006), Queen Mother (since 2006).
- Paul McCarthy, 45, Irish footballer (Wycombe Wanderers, Brighton & Hove Albion).
- Richard McMillan, 65, Canadian actor (The Day After Tomorrow, The Fountain, M. Butterfly), thyroid cancer.
- Charlotte Oleson, 84, Canadian politician.
- Sidney Schwartz, 87, American tennis player.
- Igor Shafarevich, 93, Ukrainian-born Russian mathematician.
- Saadi Simawe, 70, Iraqi-born American author.
- Renate Simson, 82, American scholar of African-American literature.
- Danuta Szaflarska, 102, Polish actress.
- Bob White, 81, Canadian trade unionist.
- Chris Wiggins, 86, English-born Canadian voice actor (Babar, Friday the 13th: The Series, The Best Damn Fiddler from Calabogie to Kaladar).
- Nancy Willard, 80, American writer.
- John S. Wold, 100, American politician, U.S. House of Representatives from Wyoming's at-large congressional district (1969–1971).
- Marilyn B. Young, 79, American historian.
- Roman Zhuravskyi, 68, Ukrainian footballer (Dynamo Kyiv, Karpaty Lviv).

=== 20 ===
- Benjamin F. Bailar, 82, American civil servant, Postmaster General (1975–1978).
- Ilene Berns, 73, American record executive (Bang Records).
- George L. Blackburn, 81, American surgeon, clinician, researcher and author.
- Jaroslava Blažková, 83, Slovak writer.
- Torbjörn Blomqvist, 76, Finnish Olympic sprint canoer.
- Brenda Buttner, 55, American news correspondent (Fox News), cancer.
- Vitaly Churkin, 64, Russian diplomat, Permanent Representative to the United Nations (since 2006), Ambassador to Belgium (1994–1998) and child actor (A Mother's Heart), heart failure.
- Timothy A. Cohn, 59, American hydrologist, mantle cell lymphoma.
- Mildred Dresselhaus, 86, American nanotechnologist.
- José Fernandes Fafe, 90, Portuguese diplomat and writer.
- Jamie Fox, 62, American government official and political strategist, New Jersey Commissioner of Transportation (2014–2015), heart failure.
- Steve Hewlett, 58, British journalist (The Guardian) and radio presenter (The Media Show), oesophageal cancer.
- Huang Feili, 99, Chinese musician and conductor.
- Sofía Ímber, 92, Romanian-born Venezuelan journalist.
- Alan Knight, 67-68, Australian academic.
- Antony Mitradas, 103, Indian film director.
- Fenton Mole, 91, American baseball player (New York Yankees).
- Leo Murphy, 78, Northern Irish Gaelic footballer.
- Cyril Pavlov, 97, Russian religious leader (Russian Orthodox Church).
- Dickie Roche, 86, Irish rugby union player.
- Eric Smith, 97, Australian artist.
- Suthan Suthersan, 60, Sri Lankan-born American environmental engineer.
- Carol Vereș, 90, Romanian Olympic rower.
- André Vlayen, 85, Belgian racing cyclist.

=== 21 ===
- Max Angus, 102, Australian painter.
- Kenneth Arrow, 95, American economist, Nobel Prize laureate (1972).
- Brunella Bovo, 84, Italian actress (Miracle in Milan, The White Sheik).
- Regina Branner, 85, Austrian Olympic athlete.
- Enzo Carella, 65, Italian singer-songwriter.
- Jeanne Martin Cissé, 90, Guinean teacher and politician.
- Douglas Coe, 88, American evangelical leader.
- Desmond Connell, 90, Irish Roman Catholic cardinal, Archbishop of Dublin (1988–2004).
- Ion Croitoru, 53, Canadian professional wrestler (SMW, AWA, WWF) and convicted criminal.
- Frank Delaney, 74, Irish author and journalist.
- Jamal Udeen Al-Harith, 50, British terrorist, suicide bombing. (death announced on this date)
- Sir Cosmo Haskard, 100, Irish-born British colonial administrator, Governor of the Falkland Islands (1964–1970).
- Joy Hruby, 89, Australian actress (Brides of Christ) and television presenter.
- Jean-Pierre Jorris, 91, French stage actor.
- Salome Karwah, 28, Liberian nurse and ebola survivor, co-Time Person of the Year (2014), complications from childbirth.
- Edwin Kessler, 88, American atmospheric scientist.
- Long John, 6, American bucking bull.
- Sir Michael Palmer, 88, British Army officer, Defence Services Secretary (1982–1985).
- Graciela Paraskevaidis, 76, Argentine writer and composer.
- Ruth L. Ratny, 89, American journalist and screenwriter, heart failure.
- David Rhoads, 84, American Olympian.
- Garel Rhys, 76, British economist and motor industry academic.
- Setrak Sarkissian, 80–81, Lebanese tabla player.
- Stanisław Skrowaczewski, 93, Polish-American conductor and composer.

=== 22 ===
- David Bárcena Ríos, 75, Mexican Olympic pentathlete (1964, 1968), equestrian (1972, 1976), and bronze medallist (1980).
- Ronald Blackwood, 91, Jamaican-born American politician, Mayor of Mount Vernon, New York (1985–1996), first elected black mayor in New York state, Parkinson's disease.
- Tommy Byars, 88, American motorcycle racer.
- Kim Chance, 70, Australian politician and farmer, member of the Western Australian Legislative Council (1992–2009).
- Maurice Chollet, 89, Swiss Olympic basketball player.
- Gordon Gray Currie, 93, Canadian politician, member of the Legislative Assembly of Saskatchewan (1982–1986).
- Ricardo Domínguez, 31, Mexican welterweight boxer, colon cancer.
- Eni Faleomavaega, 73, American Samoan politician and attorney, Delegate to the U.S. House of Representatives (1989–2015), Lieutenant Governor (1985–1989).
- Sir John Fieldsend, 95, British Zimbabwean judge.
- Trevor D. Ford, 91, British geologist.
- Ed Garvey, 76, American labor attorney, NFLPA executive director and counsel (1970–1983).
- J. Karl Hedrick, 72, American mechanical engineer, lung cancer.
- Clifford Kinvig, 82, British military historian.
- Fritz Koenig, 92, German sculptor, creator of The Sphere at the World Trade Center.
- Nikos Koundouros, 90, Greek film director (O Drakos).
- Roberto Lamarca, 57, Venezuelan actor (Por estas calles), pulmonary illness.
- Marcus Leyrer, 87, Austrian Olympic fencer (1964).
- Ralph A. Loveys, 87, American politician, member of the New Jersey General Assembly (1983–1989).
- John McCormack, 91, Canadian ice hockey player (Toronto Maple Leafs, Montreal Canadiens).
- Dag Østerberg, 78, Norwegian sociologist, philosopher and musicologist.
- Aleksei Petrenko, 78, Ukrainian-born Russian actor (Agony, World War II: Behind Closed Doors).
- Stephen Rhodes, 66, Irish radio presenter (BBC Three Counties Radio), motor neurone disease.
- George Weedon, 96, British Olympic gymnast (1948, 1952).
- Bill Woodson, 99, American voice actor (This Is Your FBI, Super Friends).

=== 23 ===
- Antonio Borghesi, 67, Italian politician.
- Ward Chamberlin, 95, American public broadcasting executive (WETA), dementia.
- Alan Colmes, 66, American political commentator (Fox News), lymphoma.
- Don Cousens, 78, Canadian politician, Ontario MPP (1981–1994), Mayor of Markham, Ontario.
- Bernie Custis, 88, American CFL player (Hamilton Tiger-Cats, Ottawa Rough Riders), member of the Canadian Football Hall of Fame.
- Edward Diethrich, 81, American cardiovascular surgeon, brain cancer.
- Bengt Fahlström, 78, Swedish journalist and television presenter, pneumonia.
- Vic Fair, 78, British graphic designer.
- Noli Francisco, 75, Filipino-born American poker player, kidney failure.
- Charles M. Herzfeld, 91, Austrian-born American scientist.
- Alfonso de Jesús Hinojosa Berrones, 92, Mexican Roman Catholic prelate, Bishop of Ciudad Victoria (1974–1985).
- Derek Ibbotson, 84, British runner, Olympic bronze medalist (1956).
- David Keightley, 84, American sinologist.
- Armin Medosch, 54, Austrian arts journalist, cancer.
- Maurice Mewis, 87, Belgian Olympic wrestler.
- Yashpal Mohanty, 38, Indian cricketer.
- Sabine Oberhauser, 53, Austrian physician and politician, Minister of Health (since 2014) and Women's Affairs (since 2016), abdominal cancer.
- Horace Parlan, 86, American-born Danish jazz pianist.
- Óscar Salas Moya, 80, Bolivian politician and trade unionist, complications from pulmonary fibrosis.
- Ivo Svoboda, 68, Czech politician, Finance Minister (1998–1999).
- Richard Tilghman, 97, American politician.
- David Waddington, Baron Waddington, 87, British politician, Home Secretary (1989–1990), Leader of the House of Lords (1990–1992), Governor of Bermuda (1992–1997).
- Leon Ware, 77, American musician, record producer, and songwriter ("I Want You", "I Wanna Be Where You Are"), complications from prostate cancer.
- Zander Wedderburn, 81, British psychologist.

=== 24 ===
- Faye Glenn Abdellah, 97, American nursing researcher and admiral.
- Aldona Aleškevičienė-Statulevičienė, 81, Lithuanian mathematician.
- Araldo Cossutta, 92, American architect.
- Daryl, 61, American magician, suicide by hanging.
- Carl Lodewijk Ebeling, 93, Dutch linguist.
- Nderitu Gachagua, 63, Kenyan politician, Governor of Nyeri County (since 2013), pancreatic cancer.
- Ronald T. Halverson, 80, American religious leader (LDS Church) and politician.
- Fumio Karashima, 68, Japanese jazz pianist, cancer.
- Lee Tsuntung, 100, Chinese Olympic basketball player (1948).
- Gustaw Lutkiewicz, 92, Polish actor (A Year of the Quiet Sun).
- Leigh Markopoulos, 48, German-born American art critic and curator.
- Fred Oldfield, 98, American painter.
- Vito Ortelli, 95, Italian racing cyclist.
- Ren Hang, 29, Chinese photographer, suicide.
- Tom Ryan, 92, Australian football player.
- Seikaku Takagi, 93, Japanese calligrapher, pneumonia.
- Miriam Tlali, 83, South African author.
- Xie Xuejin, 93, Chinese geochemist.

=== 25 ===
- Hassan Al-Jundi, 78, Moroccan author, playwright and actor (The Message).
- Abdullah Balak, 79, Turkish composer.
- Johnny Boyle, 85, Irish Gaelic footballer.
- Hassan Daaboul, Syrian general, head of military intelligence, bombing.
- Neil Fingleton, 36, English basketball player, actor and stuntman (Game of Thrones, 47 Ronin, Avengers: Age of Ultron), heart failure.
- Shifa Zikri Ibrahim, 30, Iraqi journalist (Rudaw), bombing.
- Jan Hoem, 77, Norwegian demographer.
- Scott Lew, 48, American screenwriter (Sexy Evil Genius, Bickford Shmeckler's Cool Ideas), amyotrophic lateral sclerosis.
- Bobby Lumley, 84, English footballer (Hartlepool United, Charlton Athletic).
- Eric Miller, 75, American record producer (Pablo Records), heart attack.
- Carlos Miloc, 85, Uruguayan football coach (Tigres UANL).
- Toshio Nakanishi, 61, Japanese musician (Plastics), esophageal cancer.
- Elli Norkett, 20, Welsh rugby player (national team), traffic collision.
- Bill Paxton, 61, American actor (Apollo 13, Titanic, Big Love), stroke as a complication from heart surgery.
- Don Payne, 84, American jazz bassist.
- Chez Pazienza, 47, American journalist, author and television producer.
- Jack Pope, 103, American judge, attorney and author, Chief Justice of the Texas Supreme Court (1982–1985).
- Dorothy P. Rice, 94, American economist, complications from a fall.
- Boaz Vaadia, 65, Israeli-born American sculptor, pancreatic cancer.
- Lloyd Williams, 83, Welsh rugby player (Cardiff, national team).

=== 26 ===
- Abu Khayr al-Masri, 59, Egyptian deputy leader of al-Qaeda, drone strike.
- Katalin Berek, 86, Hungarian actress (Adoption).
- Cabral, 16, Polish-born British dressage horse, Paralympic gold winner (2012), euthanized.
- Jay Cronley, 73, American writer (Tulsa World).
- Ludvig Faddeev, 82, Russian theoretical physicist and mathematician (Faddeev equations, Faddeev-Popov ghost).
- Guðjón Finnbogason, 89, Icelandic footballer
- L. R. Ford Jr., 89, American mathematician.
- Eugene Garfield, 91, American linguist.
- Ned Garver, 91, American baseball player (St. Louis Browns, Detroit Tigers, Kansas City Athletics).
- Sunny Hale, 48, American polo player, complications from breast cancer.
- Preben Hertoft, 89, Danish sexologist.
- Louis S. Kahnweiler, 97, American property developer.
- Aristides Kalantzakis, 89, Greek politician, Minister of Labor (1990–1993), Minister of Trade (1980–1981).
- Sir Gerald Kaufman, 86, British politician, MP for Manchester Ardwick (1970–1983) and Manchester Gorton (since 1983), Father of the House (since 2015).
- Stephen Lodge, 74, American screenwriter.
- Jean-Paul Martin du Gard, 89, French Olympic runner (1952, 1956).
- Essa Moosa, 81, South African judge and anti-apartheid activist.
- Robert Nurock, 78, American stock market analyst.
- Abdul Salam, 48–49, Afghan Taliban-recognized Governor of Kunduz, drone strike.
- Mushi Santappa, 93, Indian chemist.
- Irvine Sellar, 82, English property developer (The Shard).
- Ray Stokes, 92, Australian footballer.
- Joseph Wapner, 97, American judge (Los Angeles County Superior Court) and television personality (The People's Court, Judge Wapner's Animal Court), respiratory failure.

=== 27 ===
- Lyn Barnett, New Zealand-born Australian pop singer. (body discovered on this date)
- Zvjezdan Cvetković, 56, Croatian football player and manager.
- Marcel De Corte, 87, Belgian footballer (Anderlecht, national team).
- John Harlan, 91, American radio and television personality (Password, Name That Tune).
- Arvo Krikmann, 77, Estonian folklorist and academic.
- Liu Zemin, 72, Chinese politician.
- Syd Lowdon, 81, English rugby league player (Whitehaven, Workington Town, Cumberland).
- Peter Mathews, 65, Irish politician, TD (2011–2016), oesophageal cancer.
- Allen Morris, 84, American tennis player.
- Eigil Nansen, 85, Norwegian human rights activist.
- Carlos Humberto Romero, 92, Salvadoran politician, president (1977–1979).
- P. Shiv Shankar, 87, Indian politician, Governor of Sikkim (1994–1995) and Kerala (1995–1996).
- Sin Kek Tong, 72, Singaporean politician, founder of the Singapore People's Party.
- Sam Summerlin, 89, American foreign correspondent (Associated Press), complications from Parkinson's disease.
- Jórunn Viðar, 98, Icelandic pianist and composer.
- Alex Young, 80, Scottish footballer (Hearts, Everton, national team).
- Eva Maria Zuk, 71, Polish-born Mexican pianist.
- Muhammad Tauseef Ahmed, 24, Pakistani footballer.

=== 28 ===
- Yuri Abramovich, 81, Ukrainian-born Russian test pilot.
- Euel Box, 88, American film composer (Benji) and musician.
- John H. Carrington, 82, American politician.
- A. Welford Castleman Jr., 81, American physicist and chemist.
- Walker Connor, 90, American political scientist.
- Simeon Datumanong, 81, Filipino politician.
- Donald Easten, 98, British Army officer, recipient of the Military Cross.
- Leone di Lernia, 78, Italian radio host, singer and composer, liver cancer.
- Peter Feil, 69, Swedish Olympic swimmer (1968).
- Daphne Lorraine Gum, 101, Australian educator.
- Spencer Hays, 80, American art collector.
- Jarle Høysæter, 83, Norwegian television journalist.
- Marian Javits, 92, American arts patron.
- Paul Kangas, 79, American broadcaster (Nightly Business Report), complications from Parkinson's disease and prostate cancer.
- Gabriel Konertz, 62, German Olympic rower (1976).
- Carl Adam Lewenhaupt, 69, Swedish count.
- Ric Marlow, 91, American songwriter ("A Taste of Honey") and actor (Bonanza, Magnum, P.I., Hawaii Five-O).
- James McGrath, 85, Canadian politician, Lieutenant Governor of Newfoundland and Labrador (1986–1991), MP (1957–1963, 1968–1986).
- Douglas Milmine, 95, British Anglican prelate, Bishop of Paraguay (1973–1985).
- Nicholas Mosley, 93, British novelist and biographer.
- Joseph A. Panuska, 89, American educator, President of the University of Scranton (1982–1998).
- Claude Pascal, 96, French composer.
- Pierre Pascau, 78, Mauritian-Canadian journalist.
- Vladimir Petrov, 69, Russian ice hockey player, Olympic champion (1972, 1976) and silver medalist (1980).
- Antônio Ribeiro de Oliveira, 90, Brazilian Roman Catholic prelate, Bishop of Ipameri (1975–1985) and Archbishop of Goiânia (1985–2002).
- Dave Rosenfield, 87, American baseball manager (Norfolk Tides).
- Abdul Salam, 69, Indian politician.
- Bernard Shir-Cliff, 92, American book editor.
- Elisabeth Waldheim, 94, Austrian political figure, First Lady (1986–1992).
- James Walker, 76, British actor (Nineteen Eighty-Four, Empire of the Sun).
- William Wightman, 87, Canadian politician.
