= Summerlin (surname) =

Summerlin is a surname. Notable people with the surname include:

- Ed Summerlin (1928–2006), American composer, jazz saxophonist and music educator
- George T. Summerlin (1872–1947), United States Army officer and diplomat
- Jacob Summerlin (1820–1893), Florida cattleman, founder of Orlando
- Mark Summerlin (born 1970), American songwriter
- Robert L. Summerlin, American judge and politician
- Sam Summerlin (1928–2017), American journalist and writer
- William Summerlin (born 1938), American dermatologist
