= Senator Halvorson =

Senator Halvorson may refer to:

- Debbie Halvorson (born 1958), Illinois State Senate
- Rod Halvorson (born 1949), Iowa State Senate

== See also ==
- Ronald T. Halverson (1936–2017), Utah State Senate
