= Ray Byars =

Professional motorcycle racer and Harley Davidson dealer

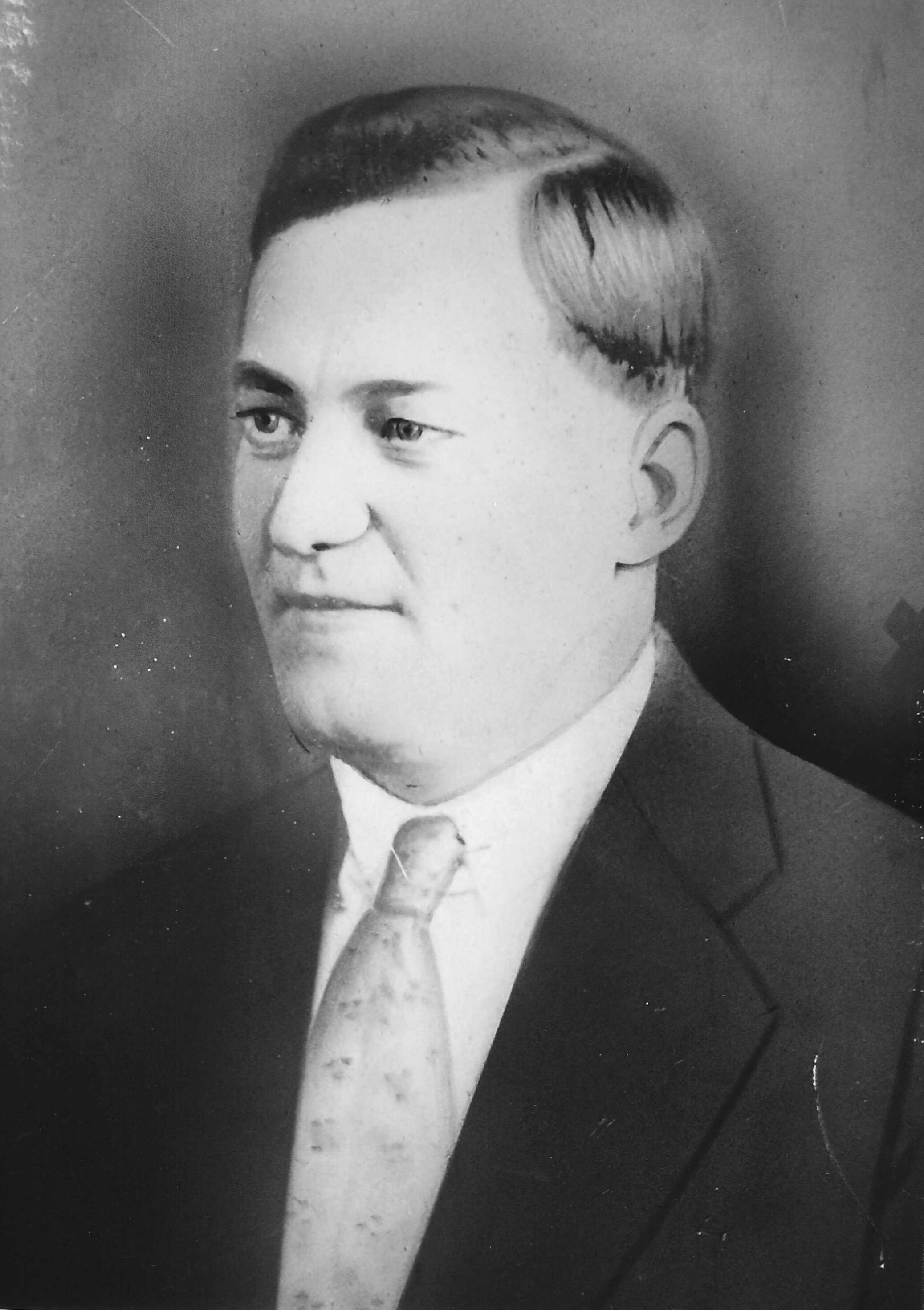
- Byars in 1927
- Born: Henry Raymond Byars; June 1, 1899
- Died: November 21, 1952
- Children: Tommy Byars

Ray Byars (June 1, 1899 - November 21, 1952) was an American professional motorcycle racer and Harley Davidson dealer from Beaumont, Texas.

== Early life ==
Ray Byars was born as Henry Raymond Byars, the son of Nora Centennial Beyers and Thomas E. Byars. He was a native of Louise, Wharton County, TX. By 1900, his family moved to Beaumont, Texas, where he grew up and resided until he died on November 21, 1952.

== Racing career ==
Byars was a professional racer from Beaumont, Texas and the progenitor of three generations of the Byars world of racing. Byars began his racing career in the late 1920s and continued through the 1930s and 1940s. The magazine Motorcyclist rated him as his district's Class B champion hill climber. Byars sometimes listed the name "The Motorcycle Man" in his newspaper ads. Byars spent much of his time racing motorcycles and traveling 8,000-35,000 miles a year. He and his "cycle-minded friends" would take off and ride somewhere to compete in motorcycle races, traveling about 500 miles each week. Byars stated, "Racing events are sanctioned so they won't conflict and there's someplace to go almost every week."

Byars raced in many motorcycle competitions sponsored by the American Motorcycle Association (AMA). He had been a motorcycle enthusiast for years and was a member of the Beaumont Motorcycle Club, which was listed as one of the ten most outstanding motorcycle clubs in the United States. He was an "outstanding sportsman" and a notable man of the Beaumont community, active in civic work who engaged in many civic affairs and was known as a friend of the community. Byars was an AMA official and he played a big part in the way time-racing techniques were formulated in America for boats and motorcycles. A 1932 endurance race victory earned him a silver medal from the AMA, a tire, and some cash.

Byars became famous throughout Texas, Louisiana and other states. Byars entered a race at McFaddin's Beach near Port Arthur, TX. He placed a classified ad for a "Gypsy Tour" race to Waco, Texas, in 1935, which was a special race and gathering of groups of motorcyclists that shared the same love of riding and racing. These events today are called "rallies" or "bike weeks".

Byars mentored his two sons (the second generation), in the racing industry helping them to earn their own titles in the world of motorcycle racing. Tommy Byars and Don Byars, became nationally famous racing in the late 1940s and 50s. Byars' grandsons (the third generation), Tommy Byars, Jr. and Robert "Bubba" Byars, became well known in AMA races during the 1960s and 1970s, winning numerous races in Daytona, Florida and various races throughout Texas and Louisiana, such as road racing, drag racing and flat track racing in the 1960s and 1970s.

Byars not only raced motorcycles, he engaged in other types of sports and racing events, such as boat racing, bicycle racing, auto racing. In addition to racing, Byars managed many motorcycle races all over Texas where thousands of spectators were in attendance to watch eligible racers that were required to be licensed by the AMA. If Byars was not racing, he was managing, judging, timing, refereeing and flagging race events. He was also an official stop-watch timer for AMA and other sporting events. In addition to flagging motorcycles, he was also a flagman for the Neches Boat Club.

== Business career ==
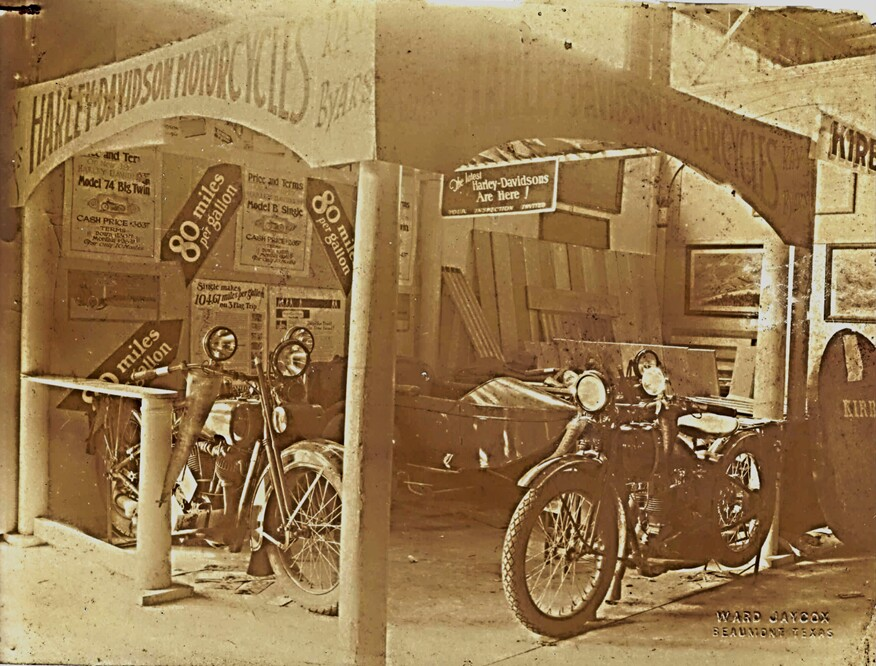
Byars' Harley Davidson shop (1927)

Byars began selling and repairing motorcycles and bicycles in Beaumont at a very young age, opening his first motorcycle and bicycle sales and service business in 1918. After a few years in business, Byars signed on with the Harley Davidson manufacturers in 1923 to become the first Harley-Davidson dealer of East Texas, "having a jurisdiction over seven counties which included Jefferson, Orange, Liberty, Hardin, Jasper, Chambers and Newton and many locations in Louisiana."

Byars' business was growing and required more space to accommodate his large inventory of motorcycles forcing him to move his business twice until it found a permanent location in 1941. Byars continued to operate his business for over a quarter of a century. After his death, his son, Tommy Byars, took over the business and continued to operate the Byars business until he retired in the 1980s.

By 1926, Byars opened his second place of business in Port Arthur, TX. Byars was now well known throughout Texas and Louisiana as a motorcycle dealer and racer, serving both Texas and Louisiana.

Byars won the bids for selling motorcycles to the area police departments. When Byars started selling Harley Davidsons to Jefferson County there were only two cycles in the area. After winning the bid, there were six in Southeast Texas, including Beaumont, Port Arthur, Liberty and Dayton. Byars was complimented by the Beaumont police chief for greatly improving the efficiency of the police departments in the surrounding cities.

Byars served at least 110 different types of businesses. He sold Package Trucks to various businesses in the community which were essentially a fast way to get attention by the public. The package truck was used for delivery in numerous businesses throughout Southeast, Texas. These trucks saved the business owners anywhere from 4 to 7 cents per mile and it equipped items suitable for the businesses to deliver to their patrons. According to records, the cost of the package truck was at least two thirds less than operating an automobile. There were numerous stock bodies that came in open or closed cabs making them satisfactory for each line of business.

Besides selling motorcycles and package trucks, Byars sold Courtesy Cars. The courtesy car consisted of a standard Harley-Davidson that attached to the side car converting the motorcycle into a three-wheel cycle. It allowed for the cyclist to transport or pick-up other individuals. It was very attractive to the eye and had a folding tow-bar that could be attached to the rear bumper of an automobile.

In an article of the Beaumont Journal published on April 26, 1941, "Byars declares that motorcycles and Beaumont have gotten into his blood and he is 'kinda figuring on staying now!' Byars, being a veteran merchant of Beaumont mentioned that he didn't care 'if the folks call his pet machines 'motorsickles' or 'motorcycles' so long as they are willing to appreciate his love of the things." Byars described motorcycles as being nothing better on the market because they were economical and that they were acceptable as a sport and had many more uses. Byars stated, "If cars were constructed like Harley Davidson motorcycles, they'd cost $7000."

Byars made many donations to various charities and businesses throughout the community. Byars participated in judging many sporting events and donated trophies for motorcycle races that were all-time records for the AMA.

== Awards ==
Byars became nationally famous after engaging in many motorcycle racing events all over America, taking the championship for 1st place, winning numerous trophies, awards and cash prizes nationwide. Byars participated in such events as hill climbing, turkey runs, endurance runs and more. For at least eight consecutive years Byars sponsored motorcycle races in Beaumont and was recognized by the American Motorcycle Association and appointed as a life member by the organization, being one of only 200 out of the entire nation's membership of 100,000 members.

== Organizations ==
Byars was active in numerous organizations throughout the community of Beaumont and the Golden Triangle. He was an active member of Calvary Baptist Church of Beaumont, TX. He was also a member of the Gulf States Harley-Davidson Dealer's Association who met frequently throughout the United States to discuss the sponsorship of upcoming motorcycle races and other events, hosting social dinners at business sessions and elections.

Byars and his wife were both members of the Beaumont Motorcycle's Club where Byars held the positions of Treasurer in 1938 and President in 1939. He and his wife hosted meetings every Wednesday night at his motorcycle shop. They also entertained members of the club, sponsoring numerous parties, games, contest, prizes and refreshments in their home during the 1930s. The club was affiliated with the American Motorcycle Association.

Byars was a member of the chamber of commerce in the Golden Triangle, and he was one of the first members of the Young Men's Business League (YMBL).

Byars became affiliated with the Masons when he was inducted into the Order of the Beaumont Masonic Lodge 286 as a Senior Steward on June 30, 1938. By August 16, 1939, Byars had achieved the level of Master Mason.

Byars was also a member of the Woodmen of the World, a fraternal benefit organization.

== Personal life ==
Byars' first wife was Katie Elphám Cole. They had three sons, one daughter, seven grandchildren and twelve great-grandchildren. Two of their sons, Tommy Byars and Don Byars, as well as grandsons Tommy, Jr. and Robert "Bubba" Byars became well known throughout Texas, Louisiana and Florida in road racing, drag racing and flat track racing in the 1960s and 1970s.

Byars divorced his first wife and married his second wife, Maxine Celestine Marble of Beaumont, on December 17, 1945. They had one son, Hugh Edgar Byars.

Byars died of a heart attack on November 21, 1952, at the age of 53 years old.
