= Cecil J. Kempf =

United States Navy vice-admiral (1927–2017)

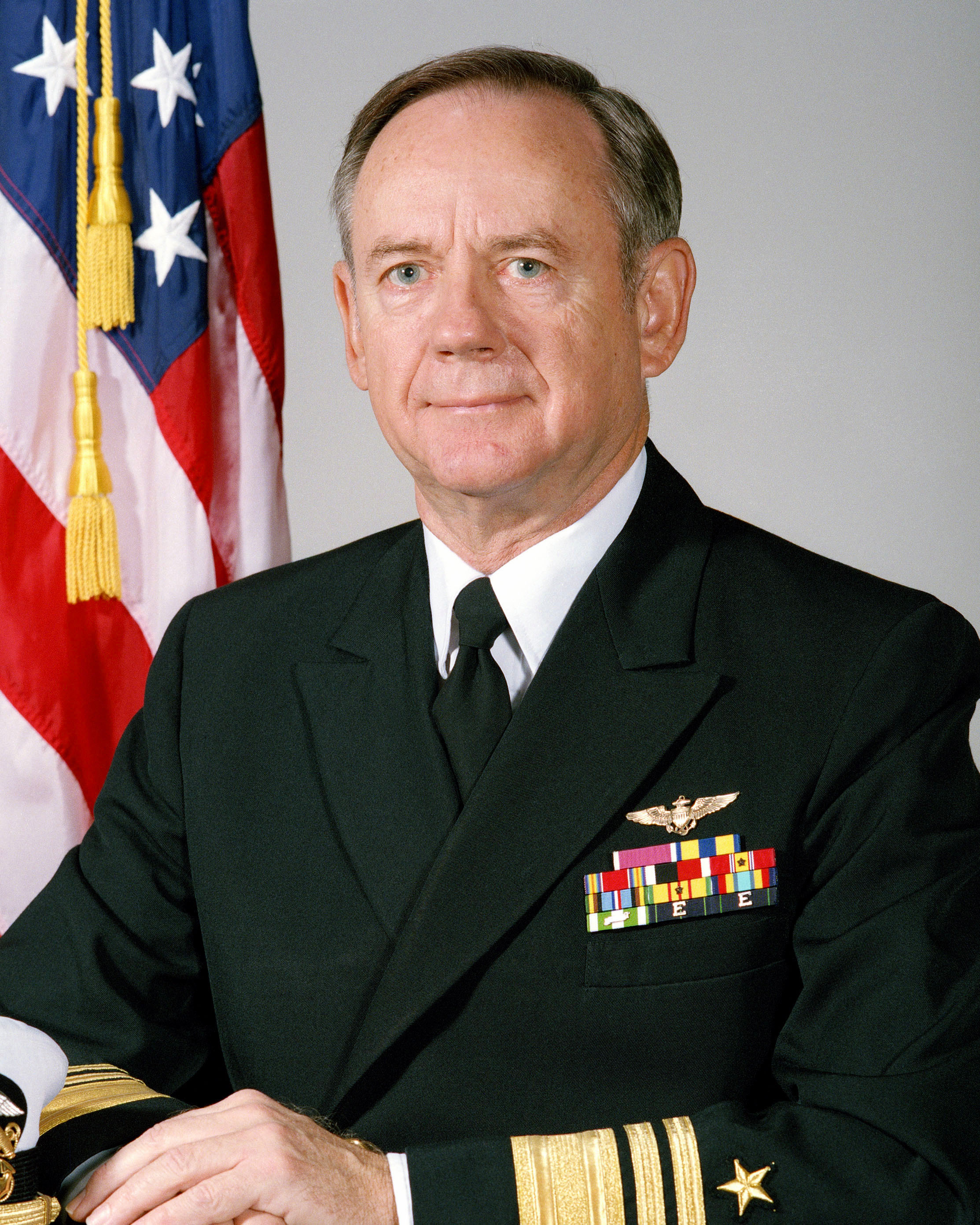
- Vice Admiral Kempf in 1985
- Born: November 20, 1927; Maud, Oklahoma
- Died: February 17, 2017 (aged 89); Coronado, California
- Military career
- Allegiance: United States
- Branch: United States Navy
- Service years: 1950–1987
- Rank: Vice Admiral
- Commands: United States Naval Reserve; USS Tripoli (LPH-10); USS Dubuque (LPD-8); Carrier Antisubmarine Air Group 60; VFA-31
- Conflicts: Vietnam War
- Awards: Navy Distinguished Service Medal; Legion of Merit; Air Medal

Cecil Joseph Kempf (November 20, 1927 – February 17, 2017) was a vice admiral in the United States Navy. He was Chief of the United States Naval Reserve from November 1983 until May 1987.

Kempf graduated from the United States Naval Academy in 1950. After completing flight school, he was designated a Naval Aviator in November 1951. Kempf later earned an M.S. degree in Aeronautical Engineering from the Massachusetts Institute of Technology in 1957.

Kempf died in February 2017 at the age of 89.
