= Yang Shiming =

Chinese thermodynamicist (1925–2017)

- Born: January 5, 1925; Wuxi, Jiangsu, China
- Died: February 4, 2017 (aged 92); Shanghai, China
- Education: Shanghai Jiao Tong University; Case Institute of Technology; Illinois Institute of Technology
- Scientific career
- Fields: Heat transfer Thermodynamic engineering
- Workplaces: Xi'an Jiao Tong University; Shanghai Jiao Tong University
- Doctoral advisor: Max Jakob

Yang Shiming or Shih-Ming Yang (simplified Chinese: 杨世铭; traditional Chinese: 楊世銘; pinyin: Yáng Shìmíng; Wade–Giles: Yang Shih-Ming) was a Chinese thermodynamicist, who was a pioneer in heat transfer in mainland China.

Yang was a standing member of the Executive Committee of the Chinese Society of Engineering Thermophysics and vice chairman of the National Educational Advisory Committee on Thermal Engineering. He had also served on the editorial board of the Journal of Engineering Thermophysics since 1980, the honorary editorial advisory board of the International Journal of Heat and Mass Transfer since 1982, and the executive committee as well as the Scientific Council of the International Centre of Heat and Mass Transfer since 1987.

== Early life and education ==
Yang fled to Shanghai at age 12. The CPC influenced him when he was studying at a high school, and he joined the party in 1941.

Yang was enrolled at Shanghai Jiao Tong University in 1942. There was a hiatus in his undergraduate life, he backed to the university in 1946 and received his BS degree from there in 1948. Meantime, he successively served as a teacher at a technical school and an engineer at a rubber factory. Afterwards, he received his MS degree from Case Institute of Technology in 1950. Then he became a graduate student with Professor Max Jakob's guidance and obtained his Ph. D. degree from Illinois Institute of Technology in 1953.

== Career ==
Upon the request of Jakob, Yang joined the Heat Transfer Laboratory of IIT before he returned to Shanghai at the end of 1953. Their concerted effort revealed the Jakob number.

Yang began to teach at Jiao Tong University since 1956, he followed the university's westward moving to Xi'an in the next year. During 1958–85, he was in charge of the thermal engineering section of Xi'an Jiaotong University as an associate professor and then a professor.

Bereavement of wife led to Yang's return to Shanghai Jiao Tong University, where he continued his work until retirement.

Yang made a great contribution to the Chinese thermodynamics education. The textbook Heat Transfer, which he edited, received the National Excellent Textbook Award in 1988.

== Family ==
Yang's wife died in the 1980s. They had a daughter and a son.
