= Saadi Simawe =

Sa'adi Simawe (1946 – February 19, 2017) was an Iraqi American author, teacher and translator, who has published many articles in English and Arabic, both original and in translation, and a novel (in Arabic) Al-Khuruj min al-Qumqum, London 1999. He was the editor of an anthology of 40 writers, "Iraqi Poetry Today", published by Zephyr Press in 2003 and author of the work of cultural criticism, "Black Orpheus: Music in African American Fiction from the Harlem Renaissance to Toni Morrison", Garland 2000.

== Background ==
Simawe was born in Diwaniyah, Iraq, in 1946. While a teenager, he was arrested, imprisoned, and beaten severely for publishing leaflets against the Ba'ath Party. After six years in prison, he was freed in a political amnesty and was allowed to return to school; he completed a BA degree in English at Al-Mustansiriya University in Baghdad. He graduated in June 1976 and left Iraq on a tourist visa; his mother paid a substantial fine, equivalent to approximately a year's income, when he did not return.

Simawe made his way via Paris to North Africa, where he taught Arabic and English in high schools in Libya until 1980.

Simawe obtained a student visa to the USA in 1980 and traveled from Tripoli, Libya to Lincoln, Nebraska, where he enrolled as a graduate student at the University of Nebraska–Lincoln. He received an MA in English from the University of Nebraska–Lincoln in 1983. The following fall he enrolled at the University of Iowa in Iowa City. Simawe first completed an MA in African-American Literature, before going on to a PhD in English, which he completed in 1994.

He joined the faculty of Grinnell College in 1992, where he was an associate professor of English, teaching courses in African-American and Arabic literature. Simawe took a leave from teaching effective fall 2007 due to illness.

As is frequently the case with Iraqi intellectuals of the most recent generation, he was unable to return to Iraq after he left in 1976, except for a two-week trip into the northern Kurdish zone after the fall of Saddam Hussein.

Simawe died on February 19, 2017, in Coralville, Iowa, from complications with Parkinson's disease.
