= Leigh Markopoulos =

American art critic, curator, and educator

- Born: September 10, 1968; Hannover, Germany
- Died: February 24, 2017 (aged 48); Los Angeles
- Occupations: Curator, professor
- Years active: 1991-2017
- Known for: Art History and Curatorial studies

Leigh Markopoulos (1968 – 2017) was an American art critic, curator, and teacher. Markopoulos was the chair of the graduate program in curatorial practice at California College of the Arts. She curated over 50 exhibitions, including ones at the Serpentine Gallery and the Hayward Gallery. Her focus was the art and artworld of the 1960s and 1970s.

== Early life and education ==
Leigh Markopoulos was born in Hannover, Germany, and grew up in Iraq, Australia and the UK. Markopoulos received a Bachelor of Arts degree from the University of Southampton, in England.

== Career ==
Starting in 1991, Markopoulos worked as a curator in London, first at the Hayward gallery, and then at the Serpentine gallery. At the Serpentine she worked with artists that included Richard Artschwager, Hans Haacke and Bridget Riley. In 2002 she moved to San Francisco to become the deputy director at the CCA Wattis Institute for Contemporary Art. From 2005 to 2008 she was the director at the Rena Bransten gallery. In 2008 she began teaching full-time at CCA as chair of the curatorial practice program, in which she had been teaching part-time since 2003. In 2010 she started working with Creative Growth, a center for artists with developmental, mental and physical disabilities, where she curated Love is a Stranger (2010).

== Publications ==
=== Books and exhibition catalogues ===
- Markopoulos, Leigh; Verlag der Buchhandlung Walther König Köln (2016). Great Expectations: Prospects for the Future of Curatorial Education. Koenig Books. ISBN 978-3-86335-914-0.
- Smith, Terry, Leigh Markopoulos and Kate Fowle, eds. Talking Contemporary Curating. New York: Independent Curators International, 2015.
- Markopoulos, Leigh (2010). Wendover. San Francisco: California College of the Arts.
- Markopoulos, Leigh and Julian Myers, eds. "HSz : as is/as if." San Francisco: California College of the Arts, 2010.
- Neshat, Shirin, and Leigh Markopoulos. Shirin Neshat. London: Serpentine Gallery, 2000.
