= Jean-Pierre Jorris =

French theatre actor

- Born: Jean-Pierre Leroux; 21 October 1925; Clamart, France
- Died: 21 February 2017 (aged 91); Versailles, France
- Occupation: Actor

Jean-Pierre Jorris (21 October 1925 – 21 February 2017) was a French theatre actor.
