= William Uttal =

American psychologist and engineer (1931–2017)

- Born: William Reichenstein Uttal; March 24, 1931; Mineola, New York
- Died: February 9, 2017 (aged 85); Phoenix, AZ
- Citizenship: USA
- Education: Ohio State University
- Known for: Criticism of cognitive neuroscience
- Partner: Michiye May Nishimura Uttal
- Children: Lynet Uttal, Lisa Uttal
- Scientific career
- Fields: Engineering; Psychology
- Workplaces: University of Michigan; Arizona State University
- Thesis: Cutaneous sensitivity to pulse electrical stimuli (1957)
- Doctoral advisor: Philburn Ratoosh

William Reichenstein Uttal (March 24, 1931 – February 9, 2017) was an American psychologist and engineer known for his criticism of cognitive neuroscience, and for his advocacy for distributed neural processing. In Uttal's obituary in the American Journal of Psychology, Stanley Coren wrote that "His distinguished academic career is difficult to classify, but his specialty probably should be put under the heading "cognitive science"."

== Career ==
Uttal studied at Ohio State University, where he earned a BS in Physics and a PhD in experimental psychology and biophysics, then joined IBM, where he worked until 1963. That year, he returned to academia at the University of Michigan, where he researched perception and consciousness. He wrote his first book, The Psychobiology of Sensory Coding, in 1973. In 1985, he retired from the University Michigan to concentrate on writing and relocated to Hawaii to work with the US Navy. Two years later, he became chair of the psychology department at Arizona State University in the school of Computing, Informatics and Decision Systems Engineering, remaining there until his retirement (for a second time) in 1999. During his career, he published 32 books (roughly one every 18-24 months) and about 140 journal articles.
