= Gretchen Garner =

American art historian (1939–2017)

- Born: December 27, 1939; Minneapolis, Minnesota, U.S.
- Died: February 15, 2017 (aged 77); Columbus, Ohio, U.S.
- Education: University of Chicago (BA); School of the Art Institute of Chicago (MFA)
- Occupations: Art historian; curator; writer; teacher; photographer

Gretchen Garner (December 27, 1939 – February 15, 2017) was an American art historian, curator, writer, teacher, and self-taught photographer.

== Biography ==
=== Education ===
Garner was born in Minneapolis, Minnesota. She enrolled at the University of Chicago in 1965 and received her BA degree in Art History. After graduating, Garner spent a year studying photography on her own with her father's 35mm camera. Between 1973 and 1975, Garner studied photography at the School of Art institute in Chicago where she took her MFA.

=== Career ===
While working as a photographer, photo editor, and instructor Garner raised two children in Chicago and Evanston, Illinois. Garner worked as a press photographer at the Chicago Daily News. Garner taught fine arts photography and history of photography at such universities as Grand Valley State College in Allendale, Michigan; Moore College of Art and Design in Philadelphia, and the University of Connecticut, where she also served as the Chair of the Art and Art History Department.

=== Later life and death ===
During Garner's later life, she continued to write scholarly articles, exhibition catalogs and books. Her last book was Winold Reiss and the Cincinnati Union Terminal where Garner reawakens Reiss’ full-color images of the mosaic murals in the Cincinnati Union Terminal. In the 1980s, Garner was inspired by the countryside around Chicago and which inspired her to take up outdoor photography. She then travel around the USA and Europe for a decade. Some of the landscapes Garner portrayed included Denmark, Sweden and France. During the 1980s she also served as the Head, Department of Art at the University of Connecticut from 1989 to 1992 and served as a Professor there until 1994. From there, Garner transferred to Moore College of Art and Design to become an Academic Dean until 1997. Garner was an adjunct professor as well as visiting artist for The Ohio State University between 2003 and 2007. From 2007 to 2017 Garner resided in her residence in Columbus, Ohio until she died at the age of 77.

== Contributions and influence ==
=== Feminist art history ===
Garner's contribution to feminist art history is especially notable. Her exhibition Reclaiming Paradise: American Women Photograph the Land (1987) was widely popular, traveling to thirteen different location sites within two years. This catalog traces the lives of nineteenth-and twentieth-century women and their relationship with the landscape. Garner redressed the exclusion of women from the landscape canon throughout her writing. Her catalog for this exhibition became a primary source on women and modern American photography.

=== Contemporary landscape photography: "The New Metaphorics" ===
In opposition to William Jenkins's New Topographics gambit, Garner advocated for a “New Metaphorics.” Garner, along with photographer and critic Deborah Bright, critiqued the work of the New Topographics as having a macho undertone. Garner's work showcased her own perspectives on documentary photography. The debate over documentary landscape photography remains an important component in contemporary landscape photography, but especially that of the 1970–80's.

== Publications ==
- Disappearing Witness: Change in Twentieth-Century American Photography. Johns Hopkins Press, 2003.
- Garner, Gretchen (2012). Gerry Sharpe: Sun And Shade, A Photographer's Story.
- Winold Reiss and the Cincinnati Union Terminal Ohio University Press; 1st ed. (2016)
- Six Ideas in Photography: A Celebration of Photography's Sesquicentennial, 1989.
- Landscapes 1981–1988, 1989.
- Reclaiming Paradise: American Women Photograph the Land, 1987.
- An Art History of Ephemera: Gretchen Garner's Catalog, Photographs, 1976–1978.

=== Photographic work ===
- "Vanitas" 1980.
- ""Portfolio '74" 1974.
- "Landscapes," 1990.
- "Jamaica."

== Exhibitions ==
| Place | Work | Location | Time |
|---|---|---|---|
| Image House Gallery | "Intimate Panoramas" | Santa Fe, NM | February–March 2001 |
| Moore College of Art and Design | | Philadelphia | September–October 1994 |
| Weir Farm National Historic Site | | Wilton, CT | April–May 1993 |
| Danforth Museum of Art | | Framingham, MA | January–February 1993 |
| Evanston(IL) Art Center, Dart Gallery Chicago | | | |
| Ithaca College Photography Gallery | "Intimate Landscapes" | | |
| Atrium Gallery, University of Connecticut | | Storrs, CT | September–October 1990 |
| Duluth (MN) Art Institute | | | June 1989 |
| Grand Rapids Art Museum | "Six Ideas in Photography: A Celebration of Photography's Sesquicentennial" | | February–March 1989 |
| Space Gallery, West Michigan University | "Kalamazoo" | | February 1989 |
| Museum of Contemporary Photography | "Birches" | Chicago, IL | September–October 1988 |
| Memorial Union Gallery, Nevada State University | | Fargo, ND | February 1987 |
| Saint Paul (MN) Academy | | | January 1987 |
| Tweed Museum of Art, University of Minnesota | "Reclaiming Paradise: American Women Photograph the Land" | Duluth, MN | 1987 |
| Lincoln Gallery, Northern State College | | Aberdeen, SD | October–November 1985 |
| Film in the Cities, St. Paul | | | November 1985 |
| Krannert Art Museum, University of Illinois | | Champaign, IL | October 1985 |
| Ruth Volid Gallery | | Chicago, IL | November 1984 – January 1985 |
| Chicago Center for Contemporary Photography | | | December 1982 |
| Exposures Gallery | | Libertyville, IL | February, 1981 |
| Dart Gallery | | Chicago, IL | December, 1982 |
| Hayden Gallery, MIT | | Cambridge, MA | May–June 1980 |
| Evanston (IL) Art Center | | | March–April 1980 |
| | "Friends of Photography" | Carmel, CA | September–October 1979 |
| New Mexico State University | | Las Cruces, NM | June, 1979 |
| Augustana College | | Rock Island, IL | January, 1979 |
| Lorado Taft in Illinois, traveling show for IL Arts Council | | Illinois | 1978–1982 |
| The Dark Room | | Chicago, IL | April, 1976 |
| ARC Gallery | | Chicago, IL | December, 1975 |
