= Robert K. Dodge =

American politician

Member of the New Hampshire House of Representatives from the Rockingham 4th district
- In office 1994–1998
- In office 2000–2001

Member of the New Hampshire House of Representatives from the Rockingham 80th district
- In office 2002–2004

Member of the New Hampshire House of Representatives from the Rockingham 9th district
- In office 2004–2006

Personal details
- Born: Robert Kenneth Dodge; June 3, 1928 Manchester, New Hampshire, U.S.
- Died: February 10, 2017 (aged 88) Merrimack, New Hampshire, U.S.
- Party: Republican
- Spouse: Irene L. Dodge (died. 2016)
- Children: 5
- Education: Rhode Island Radio and Electronics School

Robert Kenneth Dodge (June 3, 1928 – February 10, 2017) was an American politician. A member of the Republican Party, he served in the New Hampshire House of Representatives from 1994 to 1998, from 2000 to 2001 and from 2002 to 2006.

== Life and career ==
Dodge was born in Manchester, New Hampshire, the son of Fred Dodge and Victoria Rupprecht. He served in the United States Air Force during World War II, which after his discharge, he attended Rhode Island Radio and Electronics School, graduating in 1966. After graduating, he attended Bryant College, but did not graduate. He was a selectman.

Dodge served in the New Hampshire House of Representatives from 1994 to 1998. He lost his seat in the House, in 1998, when he ran as a Republican candidate for New Hampshire state senator from the 17th district. He received 926 votes, but lost in the Republican primary election to candidate Mary E. Brown, who won with 1,655 votes, which after losing in the state senate election, he served again in the House from 2000 to 2001 and again from 2002 to 2006.

== Death ==
Dodge died on February 10, 2017, in Merrimack, New Hampshire, at the age of 88.
