= Nick Dupree =

Disability rights activist and advocate in America

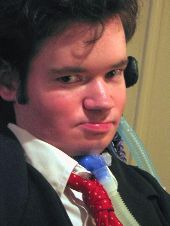
- Dupree in February 2004
- Born: Nicholas Folk Dupree; February 23, 1982; Morgantown, West Virginia, U.S.
- Died: February 18, 2017 (aged 34); New York City, New York, U.S.
- Occupations: Disability rights activist, artist, writer
- Known for: Nick's Crusade
- Partner: Alejandra Ospina

Nicholas Folk Dupree (February 23, 1982 – February 18, 2017) was an American disability rights activist and writer. His campaign, labelled "Nick's Crusade," resulted in a special program for 30 ventilator-dependent Alabamians (including himself and his younger brother) to continue home care after they turn 21 years old.

== Life ==
=== Early life ===
Dupree was born in Morgantown, West Virginia, on February 23, 1982, with an unknown mitochondrial disease believed to be related to the metabolic cycle and carnitine. Despite the disease, he was able to go to school by himself, feed himself, and use a manual wheelchair for several years into his childhood. On September 13, 1991, an infected surgical site during a Luque rods surgery triggered a collapse that killed Dupree's remaining muscle tone.

In October 1991, he got his first feeding tube, and he began using a non-invasive BiPAP ventilator to breathe in February 1992. In 1994, due to respiratory failure, Dupree underwent a tracheostomy and began using a ventilator to breathe at all times.

Dupree was admitted to Spring Hill College in Mobile, Alabama, at age 16.

=== Personal life ===
Due to his disability, he depended on a ventilator to breathe, and used a wheelchair, though he was often bedbound. He worked, created art, and communicated via the computer by using his thumb on a trackball mouse to click out text on the computer screen using KeyStrokes, an on-screen keyboard.

From 2008 onward, Dupree lived in New York City with his partner Alejandra Ospina, who is also a disability rights activist. In 2010, the couple held a public commitment ceremony in New York's Central Park, conducted in part to dramatize concern that people with disabilities are dissuaded from marrying because of U.S. government rules that could cause them to lose disability benefits if they were married.

=== Death ===
Dupree died on February 18, 2017. He had spent the last 9.5 months of his life living in hospital and nursing home environments, which he had always sought to avoid. He developed sepsis and suffered cardiac failure after many months of facility-acquired infections.

== Activism ==
=== Nick's Crusade ===
Dupree organized "Nick's Crusade", a campaign which attempted to gain continued in-home services for Alabamians with disabilities who are over the age of 21. On February 10, 2003, United States Department of Health and Human Services secretary Tommy Thompson announced a limited program in Alabama that would fund in-home services for Dupree, his younger brother, and 28 others who were turning 21 shortly.

== Other activities ==
Dupree was a prolific webcomic artist who self-published a variety of comics in different styles. He also enjoyed creating self-portraits, along with portraits of family and friends, some of which were exhibited publicly in New York City.

Dupree was active on podcaster Dan Carlin's message boards. Carlin recorded an episode about healthcare in his honor.

Dupree enjoyed writing and was working on his memoir before his death.
