= Tommy Byars =

American motorcycle racer (1928–2017)

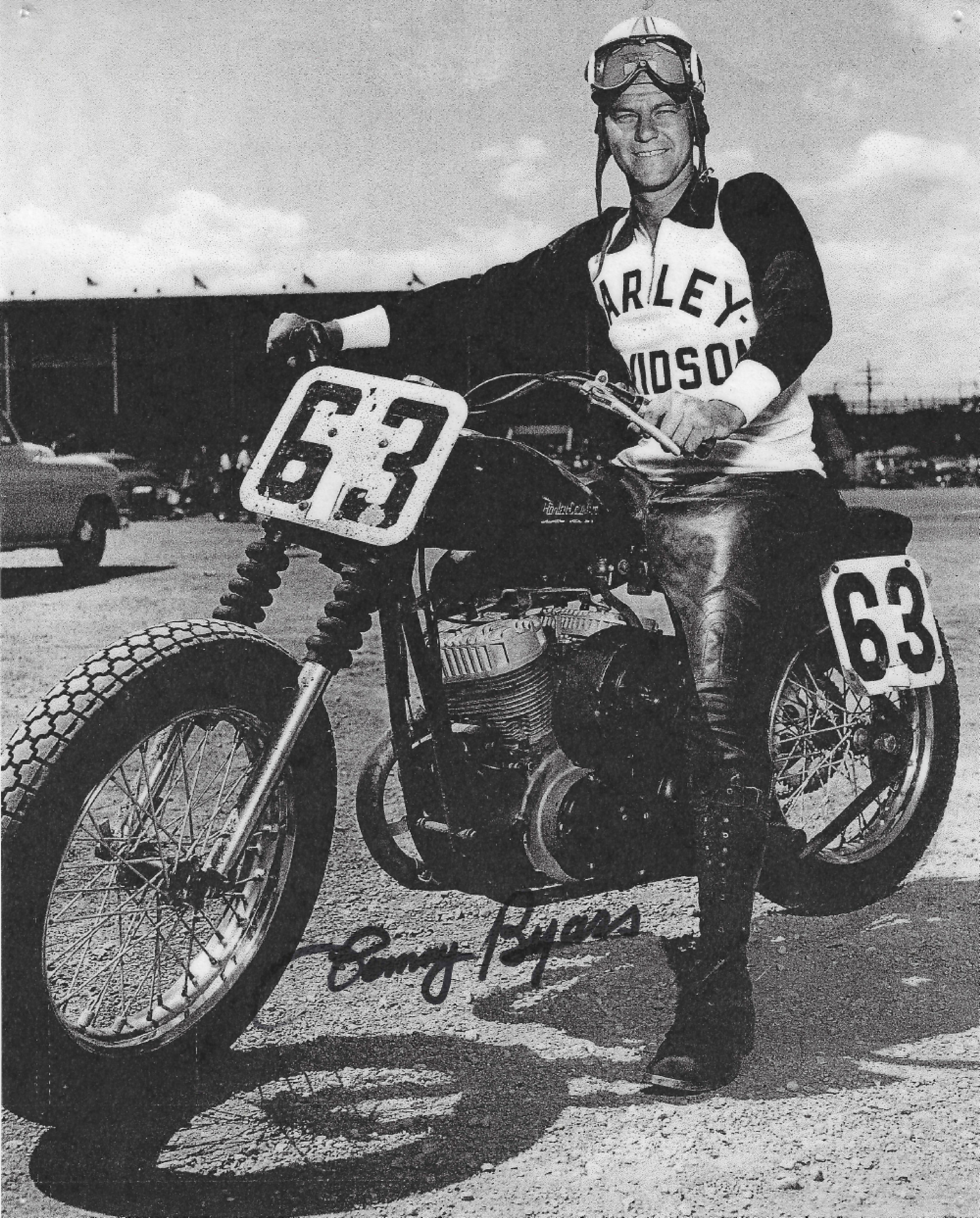
- Byars on a 1952 K model Harley-Davidson
- Born: Jesse Tommy Byars, Sr. December 28, 1928
- Died: February 22, 2017
- Bike number: 63

Jesse Tommy Byars Sr., known as Tommy Byars (December 27, 1928 - February 22, 2017) was an American professional motorcycle racer and motorcycle dealer.

== Early life ==
Byars was the son of Katy Elphám Cole and Henry Raymond Byars, also known as Ray Byars. He was a resident of Beaumont, Texas, where he owned and operated the Harley Davidson and Suzuki Dealerships. Byars' father, Ray Byars, opened his first business in 1918 where it evolved over three years into the first Harley-Davidson dealership of East Texas. Byars grew up in the motorcycle business, spending his youth in his father's bicycle/motorcycle shop. Byars began racing bicycles at 12 years old and advanced to racing motorcycle in his teens.

== Racing career ==
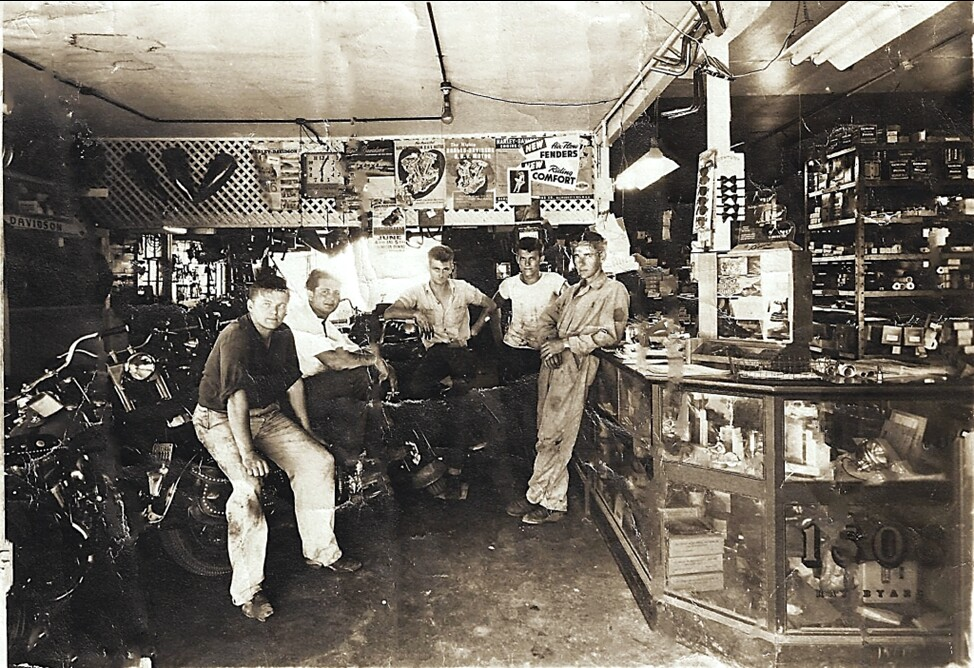
Byars (2nd from right) standing with friends.

Byars began his racing career in the mid-1940s. By 1944, Byars was assisting his father in refereeing and time keeping for motorcycle races.

Byars earned his Expert license, #63, through the American Motorcycle Association early in his racing career, during the heyday of Flat Track and TT Steeplechase dirt racing, riding alongside Caroll Resweber, Joe Leonard and Bobby Hill.

Byars started attending Harley Davidson schools for mechanics when he was about 17 years old. When the new Harley Davidson K model was introduced, Byars, being a factory-sponsored Harley rider, was issued one of the new models. He was one of the first six riders to be issued the new K model in 1951 before it was released on the market in 1952. Byars raced in numerous events and won several state and national titles, such as the Southwestern Championship, the Texas State Championship, and the Milwaukee National 5-mile race. Byars became known as the "Beaumont Hornet" after winning the Texas State Championship of the Houston Hornets. After winning the Southwest flat track motorcycle title in Houston, Byars respectively became the "Man to Beat".

Byars was ranked among the most popular men riders in the United States, rated top in numerous articles nationwide. If he was not winning the race, he was placing in the top 5 most of the time. He was unceasingly racing throughout the nation in state and national events and constantly making news. Such events included: Nashville, Tennessee; Shreveport, Louisiana; Sturgis, South Dakota; Springfield, Illinois; and Daytona Beach, Florida.

By 1957, Byars' Harley Davidson dealership required his undivided attention. Although his racing career ended, he continued in the racing industry by mentoring both of his sons, Tommy Byars, Jr. and Robert "Bubba" Byars, in road racing, drag racing and flat track racing in the 1970s.

== Business career ==
Byars was the heir of his father's business where he owned and operated the Harley Davidson dealership in Beaumont, TX. Byars literally grew up in the business, spending his youth repairing, riding and racing bicycles and motorcycles.

In the 40s, while working in his father's shop, Byars was seriously burned in an explosion. When he went to clean the grease from his hands, he grabbed a bucket of what he thought was kerosene that had been accidentally replaced with gasoline by his mother. Byars carried the bucket with him to the bathroom and poured the fluid on his hands where the fumes from the gasoline ignited by a pilot light on a nearby hot water heater causing an explosion. He was taken to Hotel Dieu Hospital in Beaumont, TX where he was treated and hospitalized for his burns.

Byars was at the height of his racing career in 1952 when his father died. After inheriting the business from his father, the dealership became more demanding of Byars’ attention; however, Byars continued to share his time between operating the dealership and professionally racing throughout the nation for several years. In 1957, the business was legally transferred into Byars’ name after his father's estate was settled. Byars’ business demanded his undivided attention; therefore, Byars was forced to retire from his racing career. Byars continued to sell Harley Davidson motorcycles throughout the 50s, 60s and early 70s and later adding Suzuki motorcycles to his business, advertising as Byars Harley Davidson-Suzuki.

In 1973, Byars invested in a new enterprise in the marketing of his motorcycles. Since Suzuki motorcycles were more equitable and becoming more popular for marketing, Byars relinquished his entire assets of the Harley Davidson dealership and contracted with the Suzuki manufacturers, organizing a new cooperation, Suzuki, INC., of Beaumont. Byars continued to own and operate his business until he retired in the late 80s.

== Awards and recognition ==
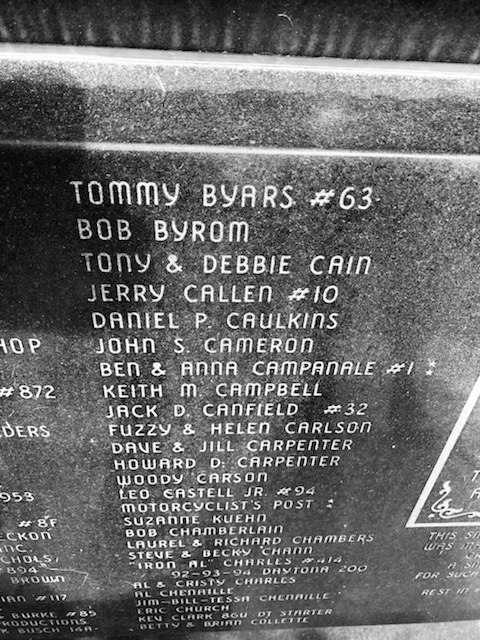
The Daytona 200 Monument Wall with "Tommy Byars No.63" carved in stone.

In 1999, Byars was inducted into the Daytona Motorcycle Hall of Fame. In his latter years, he was invited for autograph signings to many racing events in recognition of former state and national champions. In March 2002, the Daytona 200 monument was built and presented to the City of Daytona Beach by the people and various companies to preserve the memories of the original riders that raced on the beach at Daytona. Byars' name is carved in stone at this monument.

== Personal life ==
Byars married Joyce Ratcliff, the daughter of Viola Walsh and Midlredge B. Ratcliff; they had two sons, Jessie Thomas Byars Jr., born September 30, 1949, in Beaumont and Robert Wayne "Bubba" Byars, born October 3, 1951, in Beaumont. Byars left five grandchildren and 13 great-grandchildren.

Besides his main occupation of racing and selling motorcycles, Byars was interested in other competitions, such as boat racing and big game hunting.

After a long illness, Byars died at Harbor Hospice on February 22, 2017, in his home town of Beaumont.
