= Stan Jones (Indiana politician) =

American educator and politician

Member of the Indiana House of Representatives
- In office 1975–1990

Personal details
- Born: Stanley Gordon Jones; November 22, 1949 Cincinnati, Ohio, U.S.
- Died: February 6, 2017 (aged 67) Indianapolis, Indiana, U.S.
- Party: Democratic
- Spouse: Linda Jane Vaughan (m. 1973) Karen Deery (m. 2006)
- Children: Three
- Education: Purdue University

Stanley Gordon "Stan" Jones (November 22, 1949 – February 6, 2017) was an American educator and politician.

Born in Cincinnati, Ohio, Jones moved to West Lafayette, Indiana in 1967. In 1974, Jones received his bachelor's degree from Purdue University. From 1975 to 1990, Jones served in the Indiana House of Representatives and was a Democrat. Then Stan served as senior advisor to Governor of Indiana Evan Bayh, a post he would hold for more than five years, before being appointed as Indiana's 5th Higher Education Commissioner in 1995. During his more than 12-year tenure, he is credited as the primary architect of several landmark education policy initiatives, including the 21st Century Scholars program, an early promise scholarship aimed at increasing the number of low-income students attending and completing a postsecondary education. He was instrumental in the creation of the state's community college system (Ivy Tech); Indiana's Education Roundtable; the deployment of outcomes-based funding; and the implementation of Core 40, a college prep curriculum that has contributed to significant increases in high school seniors going to college.

In 2009, Jones founded the national nonprofit Complete College America and was President for 8 years, getting 42 states on board. Jones died at his home in Indianapolis, Indiana.
