= John Waggener =

U.S. Army general

- Born: August 17, 1925; Gideon, Missouri, US
- Died: February 3, 2017 (aged 91); Cape Girardeau, Missouri, US
- Burial place: IOOF Cemetery in Charleston, Missouri
- Spouse: Mary Ella Drake
- Military career
- Service years: 33 years in the U.S. Army
- Rank: Major general
- Commands: U.S. Army Engineer Training Center at Fort Leonard Wood, 1974-1976
- Conflicts: Korean War and Vietnam War
- Awards: Legion of Merit (with four oak leaf clusters), the Distinguished Service Medal, the Army Commendation with an oak leaf cluster

John "Jack" Garnett Waggener (August 17, 1925 – February 3, 2017) was an American military officer who served as Commanding General of the United States Army Engineer Training Center at Fort Leonard Wood.

== Biography ==
Born in Gideon, Missouri, Waggener grew up in Charleston, Missouri where he graduated from high school. In 1948, he graduated from the United States Military Academy at West Point. He had begun his military career in 1943 when he enlisted in the Army from Charleston. During his time in the military, Waggener held several important command posts in West Germany, the Dominican Republic, Peru, Argentina, Korea, and Vietnam. While stationed in South America, he helped build roads in the Andes Mountains and through the jungles. He was a combat veteran of both the Korean and Vietnam conflicts. He also lived for 19 years in the Lake of the Ozarks. His final assignment was as Commanding General of the U.S. Army Engineer Training Center at Fort Leonard Wood where he retired after 29 years of service. On May 30, 2003, Congressman Ike Skelton dedicated a new gate and entrance to the fort as Waggener Gate at Fort Leonard Wood. Waggener received many awards and decorations include the Legion of Merit (with four oak leaf clusters), the Distinguished Service Medal, and the Army Commendation with an oak leaf cluster.

Waggener died at age 91 in Cape Girardeau, Missouri, on February 3, 2017. He was buried at the IOOF Cemetery in Charleston, Missouri. His son, a local farmer also named John Waggener, who was born in Fort Belvoir, Virginia, died in 2022 at age 69. His grandson attended the United States Naval Academy at Annapolis, Maryland. In 2021, Waggener was posthumously inducted into the Missouri Veterans Hall of Fame.
