= Keith Barber (geographer) =

British geographer and academic

Keith Edward Barber (9 November 1944 – 1 February 2017) was a professor of physical geography at the University of Southampton. Barber specialized in palaeoecology, landscape and climate change, and human impact throughout the Quaternary. He retired in 2009.
