= Jack Mulrooney =

Australian rules footballer

Personal information
- Full name: John Mulrooney
- Born: 24 August 1934
- Died: 16 February 2017 (aged 82); Wangaratta, Victoria
- Original team: Golden Point
- Height: 180 cm (5 ft 11 in)
- Weight: 76 kg (168 lb)

Playing career^{1}
Years	Club	Games (Goals)
1956–58	St Kilda	36 (18)
- ^{1} Playing statistics correct to the end of 1958.

John Mulrooney (24 August 1934 – 16 February 2017) was an Australian rules footballer who played with St Kilda in the Victorian Football League (VFL).
