= Alice Ludes =

American singer

- Born: Alice Sizer; December 20, 1912; Tacoma, Washington, U.S.
- Died: February 12, 2017 (aged 104); Ventura, California, U.S.
- Occupation: Singer
- Years active: 1933–1945

Alice Ludes (née Sizer; December 20, 1912 – February 12, 2017) was an American singer, a member of the Music Maids, a quintet heard on radio and in several films in the 1940s.

== Early life ==
Alice Sizer was born a twin on December 20, 1912, in Tacoma, Washington, one of eight children born to E.R. and Minnie Sizer. Her father was a car mechanic who served in World War I.

== Career ==
Sizer entered show business after graduating from high school. Along with a pair of sisters, Ethelyn and Laura Williams, she formed a trio called The Williams Sisters. The group relocated to San Francisco after signing a contract with NBC.

With her 1939 marriage and move to Los Angeles, Ludes joined an all-women vocal group promoted by musical comedian Bob Burns, called the Music Maids. One of the other members of the Music Maids was Trudy Erwin; Kay Thompson arranged music for the ensemble. The Music Maids often posed for publicity photographs together in matching dresses. They regularly performed on Bing Crosby's radio program and in several movies, including Broadway Melody of 1940, Hit Parade of 1943 and Meet Me in St. Louis. During her professional career, she performed with notable performers such as Judy Garland Mary Martin, Victor Borge, and Dick Winslow.

== Filmography ==
- East Side of Heaven (1939)
- Broadway Melody of 1940 (1940)
- Kiss the Boys Goodbye (1941)
- Ziegfeld Girl (1941)
- Babes on Broadway (1941)
- Panama Hattie (1942)
- Du Barry was a Lady (1943)
- Hit Parade of 1943 (1943)
- Hoosier Holiday (1943)
- Girl Crazy (1943)
- Broadway Rhythm (1944)
- Jamboree (1944)
- Meet Me In St. Louis (1944)
- A WAVE, a WAC and a Marine (1944)
- Yolanda and the Thief (1945)
- Riffraff (1947)

== Personal life ==
In 1939, Sizer married radio announcer and audio technician Ed Ludes. They had three children. Her husband died in 1987. Alice Ludes was living in Ventura, California, and still playing piano, at the time of her 102nd birthday in December 2014. She turned 104 years old on December 20, 2016. Alice Ludes died on February 12, 2017, aged 104.
