= Hassan Daaboul =

- حسن دعبول
- Died: February 25, 2017
- Military career
- Allegiance: Ba'athist Syria
- Branch: Military Intelligence Directorate
- Rank: General
- Commands: Head of Military Intelligence in Homs

Hassan Daaboul (Arabic: حسن دعبول; died February 25, 2017) was a Syrian army general. He was the head of Military Intelligence for the city of Homs. He was one of the 42 people killed by Hay'at Tahrir al-Sham in a series of suicide bombings in Syria on February 25, 2017.
