= James Sankowski =

American artist

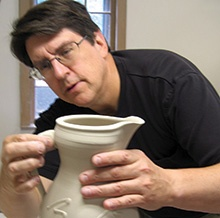
- Born: James Sankowski; October 28, 1949; Schenectady. NY
- Died: February 5, 2017 (aged 67); Ballston Lake, New York
- Education: Central College; Bowling Green State University
- Known for: Ceramic Art
- Website: http://ballstonlakepottery.com/

James "Jim" Sankowski (October 28, 1949 – February 5, 2017) was an American ceramic artist. He was a studio potter known for creating high-fired porcelain pottery that was described as functional, decorative, and contemporary.

Sankowski attended Central College in Iowa, graduated with a Bachelor's Degree in Art in 1972, and received an MFA in Ceramic Art in 1974 from Bowling Green State University in Ohio. In 1975, he moved back to upstate New York to open a gallery in Ballston Lake, New York. Sankowski worked and displayed his pottery out of his gallery until he died on February 5, 2017, at 67.

== Career ==
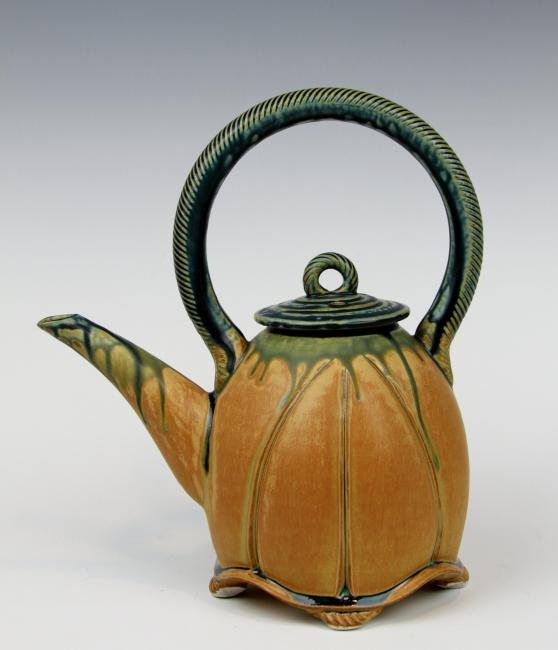
A pot made by James Sankowski

After college, Sankowski opened Ballston Lake Pottery and worked out of his studio as an artist, but sold his works nationally. He thought it was important that his work was both durable and functional. In Ceramics Monthly, Sankowski said: "When someone tells me they would be afraid to use my pots, they deny themselves the pleasures of putting the pot into service. To do this is to neglect the tactile qualities of the pot. The balance of a handle, a good pouring spout and the fit of a lid are as important as the visual response."

Sankowski was one of the founding members of the Albany Saratoga Pottery Trail, which encouraged people to buy local, highlighting local potters and their connection to the area.

In addition to displaying his work in Ballston Lake, he was a nationally exhibiting craftsperson. Sankowski's work has been highlighted in industry publications like Ceramics Monthly, Studio Potter, and The Art of Contemporary American Pottery. He's exhibited at craft and arts fairs like the Cedar Creek Gallery's National Teapot Show IX in 2014, the Memorial Art Gallery Clothesline Festival in 2012, and the 1999 Smithsonian Craft Show in Washington, D.C. Sankowski also held workshops and seminars around the country.
