= Yashpal Mohanty =

Indian cricketer (1978–2017)

Personal information
- Born: 6 November 1978; Cuttack, Odisha, India
- Died: 23 February 2017 (aged 38)
- Source: Cricinfo, 18 April 2018

Yashpal Mohanty (6 November 1978 – 23 February 2017) was an Indian cricketer. He died after being in a coma for two years following a car accident. He played in seven first-class and seven List A matches for Odisha between 1997 and 2002. His family announced the foundation of BEN-E-VOLENT, in memory of Yasphal, an organization to give financial aid to patients of neurosurgery, cardiac, and paediatric care.
