= Frances Prince =

American politician

Frances Kay Roush Prince
- Born: October 24, 1937; San Pedro, California
- Died: February 6, 2017 (aged 79)
- Other names: Frances Prince
- Occupation: Mayor
- Years active: 1969-1984

Frances K Prince (1937–2017) was the first woman mayor of Thousand Oaks, California, and played a pivotal role in the city's development for three decades. Initially entering politics as a result of a dispute with a developer over her residential neighborhood, Prince returned to school and earned a Juris Doctor degree. She was concerned about over-development, conservation, and city planning, and formally entered politics in 1972, moving from the planning commission to the city council and finally mayor. She also served on state agencies, chairing the regional commission of the state parks authority. Upon leaving office, she worked at a large law firm which focused in the area of civil defense before scaling back her career to work as a director of a senior citizens' facility.

== Early life ==
Frances Kay Roush was born on October 24, 1937, in San Pedro, California. She attended the San Diego State University, receiving a bachelor's of arts degree in history and political science. While at university, she met her husband Harvey Prince, with whom she had three children and in 1968 they moved to Thousand Oaks.

== Career ==
Prince entered politics soon after the family's move, after noting the developmental company William Lyon Homes breaking a promise to use some of its land for a park, with it instead being used for the construction of high-density housing. She was one of the residents who founded the homeowner's association for the neighborhood and was elected as its president. The association was active, with Prince fighting developers who failed to live up to their plans or violated their permits. In 1972, she was appointed to serve on the planning commission evaluating development issues at the city-wide level, looking at such things as balancing code violations with safety issues and public desire. She was one of the commissioners who worked on the development of the Thousand Oaks General Plan to ensure that adequate open space reserves were maintained.

Prince served on the planning commission until 1975 and was elected to the City Council in 1976. Her concerns were about controlling over development and limiting growth to maintain lower taxes and housing prices, as well as preserving the semi-rural environment of the area. In 1978, Prince founded and served as chair of Conejo Open Space Conservation Agency to protect area green spaces. She served two terms as mayor with her first term from 1978-1979 and her second from 1983-1984 the first woman elected to that office. She was active in plans to develop the city library, which opened in 1982 and to develop an arts center, which was finally approved for development as the Thousand Oaks Civic Arts Plaza in 1990.

During her tenure on the council, Prince returned to school and graduated as valedictorian of her class with Juris Doctor's degree from University of La Verne College of Law in 1980. She was also appointed to serve on the governor's state parks agency conservation commission. Serving on the Santa Monica Mountains Conservancy, the regional board of the state agency, she began as an advisor 1980, became a full member in 1982, and served as the chair on the Conservancy's board of directors until 1984. At the end of her final term as mayor, she chose not to run again, and went to work for a large Los Angeles law firm specializing in civil defense work.

In 1991, Prince resigned from the firm and went to work for Senior Concerns, a facility which focused on the needs of older citizens and functioned as a day center for people who had Alzheimer's disease. When the group was given a building to repurpose an apartment complex for their needs, she led the sometimes heated discussion with the City Council and was seen as a pivotal force in the final approval of the project in 1992.

== Death and legacy ==
She died on 6 February 2017 and is remembered for her skill as a public policy maker. The Los Angeles Times noted in an article in 1997, that between 1969 and 1984, "probably no one had more impact than Prince on the public life of Thousand Oaks".
