= Timothy A. Cohn =

American hydrologist

Timothy A. Cohn (1957 – February 20, 2017) was an American hydrologist with the US Geological Survey, USGS Science Advisor for Hazards (1998–2001), and lecturer at Johns Hopkins University (2006 - ). Cohn served in the office of Senator Bill Bradley (D-NJ) in 1995-97 as a AAAS Congressional Science Fellow, and worked on the unsuccessful Bradley presidential campaign in 2000. After 2005, Cohn was a member of the Governing Board of the American Institute of Physics.

Cohn's research focused on flood frequency analysis, estimation of nutrient transport in rivers, and the interpretation of trends in hydroclimatological data. Cohn's most controversial research, which has not been fully embraced by the climate science community, suggests that the significance of climate trends may be greatly overstated because it does not consider the possibility that long-term persistence is a component of climatic variability.

Cohn held a B.A. in mathematics from Swarthmore College (1979) and M.A. (1984) and PhD (1986) degrees in water resource systems engineering from Cornell University.

Cohn was an avid marathoner and past president of the Reston Runners organization in Reston, Virginia.

Cohn was a board member of the Reston Association.

== Selected publications ==
- "Estimating Contaminant Loads in Rivers: An Application of Adjusted Maximum Likelihood to Type I Censored Data," Water Resources Research 41(8), 13 pp., 2005.
- "The Uneasy Courtship of Science and Politics," Eos, 83(49), 3 December 2002. (Reprinted in Water Resources IMPACT, 5(2), pp. 28–29, March 2003.)
- "Recent Advances in Statistical Methods for the Estimation of Sediment and Nutrient Transport in Rivers," chapter 21 in Contributions in Hydrology, US National Report to the IUGG, pp. 1117–1124, 1995.
- Cohn contributed in several areas to the publication of Statistical Methods in Water Resources, particularly to the sections on bias correction in regression, and methods for data below the reporting limit.
