= Richard Gebhardt =

American politician (1931–2017)

Member of the Colorado House of Representatives from the 7th district
- In office January 11, 1967 – January 8, 1969
- Succeeded by: Paco Sanchez

Member of the Colorado House of Representatives from the 40th district
- In office January 13, 1965 – January 11, 1967

Personal details
- Born: May 18, 1931 Denver, Colorado, U.S.
- Died: February 13, 2017 (aged 85)
- Party: Democratic
- Spouse: Vici
- Education: University of Colorado Boulder

Richard Gebhardt (May 18, 1931 – February 13, 2017) was an American politician. He served as a Democratic member of the Colorado House of Representatives.

== Life and career ==
Gebhardt was born in Denver, Colorado. He attended the University of Colorado Boulder.

He was adopted by Glenn and Dora Gebhardt when he was two and a half; his adoptive parents were both public teachers.

Gebhardt grew up in Denver, and spent summers traveling in the western U.S. with his photographer father.

He served as a medic during the Korean War, was wounded, captured briefly, then rescued and discharged.

== Elections ==
In 1960, Gebhardt ran for District 5 in the Colorado Senate. He won the Democratic primary election, but in the general election he was defeated by A. Woody Hewett.

In 1964, Gebhardt ran to represent District 40 (Boulder County) in the Colorado House of Representatives. He was elected and took office in January 1965. In 1966, redistricting put Gebhardt in House District 7. He was re-elected and began representing the district in 1967.

In 1968, Gebhardt sought election to House District 41, again following a redistricting. In the general election, he was defeated by Sandy Arnold.

In 1970, Gebhardt sought election to Colorado's 2nd congressional district. He was unopposed in the Democratic primary election but lost to Donald G. Brotzman in the general election.

Richard was the first Democrat elected in Boulder County in 16 years.

== Death ==
Gebhardt died on February 13, 2017, at the age of 85.
