= Don Busath =

American photographer

Don Busath (February 4, 1931– February 8, 2017) was an American photographer who specialized in portraiture. He photographed Ezra Taft Benson, Gordon B. Hinckley and Thomas S. Monson among many other leaders of The Church of Jesus Christ of Latter-day Saints. He also photographed many government officials, although his true speciality was making family photographs.

Don Busath was born on February 4, 1931. He opened his own studio in 1973 after having worked for 15 years for Hal Rumel Studios. His wife, Donna, ran the business aspects of the studio while he focused on the artistic side. His main focus over the years was wedding and portrait photography. He also did the photography that is shown on many Mormon Tabernacle Choir CDs.

In the late 1990s, the Busaths served an LDS mission in California. Their son, Drake, became a photographer and eventually took over the business. He renamed it Busath Studio and Gardens and expanded from the one location in downtown Salt Lake City to a second one in Provo, Utah.

Busath was a recipient of the Professional Photographers of America National Award. He as well as his son Drake and daughter Deanne have all served as presidents of the Intermountain Professional Photographers Association. Busath has also been an instructor in photography at the Salt Lake Art Center School of Photography.

Busath produced at least two books Temple Square: In the Light of the Seasons and Temples: A Photographic Journey of Temples, Lands and Peoples. The latter was co-authored with Matthew Heiss. Busath also created Ibn Tulun Mosque: Gayer Anderson Museum Book #5 with Amal Ahmad El Emary.

Busath died on February 8, 2017.

== Sources ==
- Professional Photography Magazine article on Busath
- Mormon Times July 14, 2010
- Busath Studio webpage
- All books listing for Busath
- DeseretBook.com bio of Busath
- list of Prophessional Photographers Association National Award recipients
