= Dewey Crump =

American politician

Member of the Missouri House of Representatives from the 84th district
- In office January 5, 1983 – November 30, 1990
- Preceded by: Eileen McCann
- Succeeded by: Mark Holloway

Member of the Missouri House of Representatives from the 71st district
- In office January 3, 1979 – January 5, 1983
- Preceded by: Stephen Banton
- Succeeded by: Fred Brummel

Personal details
- Born: November 11, 1946
- Died: February 4, 2017 (aged 70) High Ridge, Missouri
- Party: Democratic

Dewey Crump (November 11, 1946 – February 4, 2017) was an American politician who served in the Missouri House of Representatives from 1979 to 1990. His political career ended with a drug crimes conviction.

He died on February 4, 2017, in High Ridge, Missouri at age 70.
