= Irwin Stambler =

American writer

Irwin Stambler (20 November 1924 – 10 February 2017) was an American writer.

== Early life and education ==
Born in Brooklyn, New York, to Sidney Stambler, a jewelry and silver fabricator, and Bessie Levine, a piano teacher, Irwin Stambler attended New York University. His studies in aeronautical engineering were interrupted by a two-year service in the Army during World War II, after which he completed his bachelor's and master's degrees.

== Career ==
Stambler started his career as an aerospace engineer, but later transitioned to writing about topics such as aerospace, technology, music, and sports.

By 1969, he had authored two music encyclopedias, including a collaboration on a country music volume. Despite an initial interest in authoring a rock encyclopedia in the 1960s, his first major music work was Encyclopedia of Popular Music (1965), which included entries on Elvis Presley and the Everly Brothers. His work The Encyclopedia of Pop, Rock and Soul, published in 1974 by St. Martin's Press, covered a broad spectrum of music history. He also wrote articles for Space Aeronautics and newsletters.

== Bibliography ==
- Space Ship: Story of the X-15 (1961)
- The Battle for Inner Space: Undersea Warfare and Weapons (1962)
- Wonders of Underwater Exploration (1962)
- Breath of Life: Story of Our Atmosphere (1963)
- Build the Unknown (1963)
- Project Gemini (1964)
- Encyclopedia of Popular Music (1965)
- Supersonic Transport (1965)
- Orbiting Space Stations (1965)
- Automobiles of the Future (1966)
- Great Moments in Auto Racing (1967)
- Guide to Model Car Racing (1967)
- Weather Instruments (1968)
- Worlds of Sound (1968)
- Ocean Liners of the Air (1969)
- Encyclopedia of Folk, Country and Western Music (1969, 1984) (with G. Landon)
- World of Microelectronics (1969)
- Project Viking (1970)
- Guitar Years: Popular Music from Country and Western to Hard Rock (1970)
- Golden Guitars: The Story of Country Music (1971) (with G. Landon)
- Great Moments in Stock Car Racing (1971)
- Unusual Automobiles of Today and Tomorrow (1972)
- Shorelines of America (1972)
- Automobile Engines of Today and Tomorrow (1973)
- Revolution in Light (1973)
- The Supercars and the Men Who Drive Them (1974)
- Speed Kings (1974)
- Women in Sports (1975)
- Encyclopedia of Pop, Rock and Soul (1975, 1989)
- The Supercars and the Men Who Race Them (1975)
- Bill Walton, Super Center (1976)
- Catfish Hunter (1976)
- Here Come the Funny Cars (1976)
- Minibikes and Small Cycles (1977)
- New Automobiles of the Future (1978)
- Top Fuelers (1978)
- Racing the Sprint Cars (1979)
- Dream Machines: Vans and Pickups (1980)
- New Encyclopedia of Folk, Country and Western Music (1983) (with G. Landon)
- Off-Roading (1984)
- Encyclopedia of Country & Country Rock (1997)
- Encyclopedia of Folk and Blues (2000) (with L. Stambler)
