= Su Qiang =

Chinese inorganic chemist (1931–2017)

- Born: July 15, 1931; Guangzhou, Guangdong, China
- Died: February 17, 2017 (aged 85); Guangzhou, Guangdong, China
- Education: Sun Yat-sen University; Peking University (Tianjin University)
- Scientific career
- Fields: Rare earth elements
- Workplaces: Changchun Institute of Applied Chemistry, CAS; Sun Yat-sen University

Su Qiang (simplified Chinese: 苏锵; traditional Chinese: 蘇鏘; pinyin: Sū Qiāng; Wade–Giles: Su Ch'iang; 1931–2017) was a Chinese inorganic chemist. A pioneer in rare earth research and applications, he was elected an academician of the Chinese Academy of Sciences in 1995.

Su enrolled at Sun Yat-sen University in 1948, he transferred to Department of Chemical Engineering (which is a part of Tianjin University nowadays), Peking University two years later, and graduated in 1952. Then he went to Changchun, and became a professor there in 1983. He taught at Sun Yat-Sen University since 1999.

Su was the Chairman of the Second International Conference on the Spectra of Rare Earth Elements, and a Committee Member of the Third and Sixth International Conferences on f-elements.
