= Huang Mulan =

Chinese Communist Party agent

- Born: Huang Dinghui; 9 July 1906; Liuyang, Hunan, Qing China
- Died: 7 February 2017 (aged 110 years, 213 days); Hangzhou, Zhejiang, China
- Other names: Huang Zhangding, Huang Shuyi
- Occupation: Espionage
- Known for: Agent for the Chinese Communist Party

Huang Mulan (Chinese: 黄慕兰; 9 July 1906 – 7 February 2017) was a secret agent for the Chinese Communist Party (CCP). She was also known as Huang Zhangding and Huang Shuyi.

== Early career ==
She was born as Huang Dinghui (黄定慧) in Liuyang, Hunan, Qing dynasty. Her parents supported emancipation for women. For example, they made the decision not to have her feet bound, an unusual choice among educated people living near them, and sent her to a local women's school at the age of twelve. At the age of 18 she escaped an arranged marriage and arrived in Hankou, Hubei, where she joined women's campaigns and one year later was elected president of the city's women's department.

In 1926, after joining the Chinese Communist Party (CCP), she changed her name to "Huang Mulan," expressing admiration for legendary woman warrior Hua Mulan. In 1927 the First United Front fell apart and a purge of communists related to the party began. Huang went underground along with her husband, Wan Xiyan. Wan died in 1928, a few months after the couple's son was born. Following her husband's death, Huang sent her son to her in-laws and began taking up tasks again.

Huang is credited with saving China's first premier Zhou Enlai from kidnappers in 1930, based on information she learned from the Kuomintang. She was the person who alerted the CCP leadership to the defection of the party's General Secretary Xiang Zhongfa and, thanks to her alarm, heavy losses were avoided.

== Later life ==
Huang Mulan was twice imprisoned and spent 17 years in prison from the 1950s to 1975. Following her release, Huang kept filing lawsuits to clear her name. In 1980, with the support of Zhou Enlai's widow Deng Yingchao, her achievements were confirmed by the CCP.

== Personal life ==
She was married four times and her stories have been captured in several books, films and TV drama series. An autobiography was released in 2012.

Huang spent her final three years at the Zhejiang hospital in Hangzhou, China living under her birthname "Huang Dinghui." She died on 7 February 2017, aged 110 years.
