= Joseph Green (producer) =

- Born: 1934; Philadelphia, United States
- Died: 3 February 2017; Toronto, Ontario, Canada
- Education: Indiana University Bloomington
- Occupations: Producer, professor
- Years active: 1965-2017
- Employer: York University
- Notable work: Glory Enough for All
- Spouse: Rhoda Green
- Children: 2

Joseph Green (1934 – 3 February 2017) was the founding chair of the Department of Theatre and Dean of the Faculty of Fine Arts (1973–1980) at York University, Toronto. He also worked as a producer for a number of theatre, film and television projects.

== Early life ==
Joe Green was born and raised in Philadelphia. He studied Theatre at Temple University, graduating with a BA in 1956. He went on to obtain a Ph.D. in Dramatic Theory and Rhetoric at Indiana University Bloomington in 1964. Green had a number of early teaching positions, including the University of Louisville, Indiana University, South Bend and Hunter College. He came to York University, Toronto in 1968.

== Career and personal life ==
As a faculty member at York University Green held a number of important positions which served to advance the Fine Arts and Theatre programs at York. In late winter of 1969, while serving as associate dean, Green was appointed Acting Dean, serving in the interim months until founding dean Jules Heller's return from medical leave. Dean of the Faculty of Fine Arts from 1973 to 1980—a period of enormous growth and change at the university—Green founded the departments of Visual Art, Dance, Film, Music and Theatre. He also established the York Winds Ensemble and the Canadian Theatre Review. The Canadian Theatre Review is an important publication in the sphere of theatre in Canada. At York Green was instrumental in a number of important initiatives, including bringing Mavor Moore to the Faculty, as well as founding the York Performance Artists Series at Burton Auditorium, where numerous artists, such as Alan Ginsberg, Tom Wolfe and Henry Moore were guests. He also helped to establish the MBA in Arts Administration at York University. He was active as a board member, serving on the boards for the Gardiner Museum of Ceramic Art, the Canada Council, and the Ontario Arts Council. He also served on the boards of the Toronto Garden District Residents’ Association, and the Canadian Senior Artists’ Resource Network (CSARN). He retired from York University in 1994. Green was an active member of a number of community groups, including the Democrats Abroad (Canada, serving as Chair and international Voter Registration Chair).

Green produced a number of successful projects through Gemstone Productions, including The Dining Room, The Sunshine Boys (1986) and with Ken Ludwig, Sullivan and Gilbert. Sullivan and Gilbert was a co-production with the National Arts Centre in Ottawa and the Kennedy Center. Green acted as a co-producer, along with John McKeller, on the Mirvish Productions work Syncopation. He also was involved in television, acting as executive producer for the award-winning mini-series Glory Enough for All, a work focused on Frederick Banting and the discovery of insulin. The series was aired on the CBC, PBS, and Thames Television in the United Kingdom.

In 2016 Green moved to Kensington Hospice, Toronto. He gave an interview to CBC in December 2016, reflecting on terminal illness and hospice care. He died on February 3, 2017, due to renal and bladder cancer.

== Awards and honours ==
- Green received a Gemini award in 1989 for the series Glory Enough for All
- "In recognition of Green’s long tenure at York as first Chair (then Associate Dean of AMPD, then Dean of AMPD) that the department’s most used performance space, the black box studio in CFT, is today known as the Joe Green Theatre."

== Further resources ==
- From orchestras to apartheid. Jean M Guiot, J. G Green, Politics, and the Arts Conference on Social Theory (eds.). North York, Ontario: Captus Press. 1990. ISBN 9780921801689.
- Green, J. G (1965). Joseph Wood Krutch, critic of the drama (Thesis).
