= Aldona Aleškevičienė-Statulevičienė =

Lithuanian mathematician (1936–2017)

- Born: 1 January 1936; Džiugai, Ukmergė County, Lithuania
- Died: 24 February 2017 (aged 81); Vilnius, Lithuania

Academic background
- Education: Vilnius University (PhD); Academy of Sciences of Uzbekistan (PhD)
- Thesis: Limit Theorems for Markov Chains in Case of Stable Limit (1964)
- Doctoral advisor: Vytautas Statulevičius

Academic work
- Discipline: Mathematics
- Institutions: Lithuanian Academy of Sciences
- Main interests: Probability theory

Aldona Džiugaitė-Aleškevičienė-Statulevičienė (1 January 1936 – 24 February 2017) was a Lithuanian mathematician who specialized in probability theory.

== Biography ==
Aleškevičienė-Statulevičienė was born on 1 January 1936 in Džiugai, Ukmergė County, Lithuania.

Aleškevičienė-Statulevičienė graduated from Vilnius University as a Doctor of Physics and Mathematics in 1964. She worked at the Institute of Mathematics and Informatics until 2010. She gained a second PhD from the Academy of Sciences of Uzbekistan.

Aleškevičienė-Statulevičienė died in 2017 in Vilnius.

== Scientific activity ==
Aleškevičienė-Statulevičienė's most important work is on the limit theorems of probability theory, including work on renewal theory, and related work involving polynomials, multiple integrals, and nonlinear functions.

Aleškevičienė-Statulevičienė was the chief researcher at the institute of mathematics and informatics at the Lithuanian Academy of Sciences from 1989 to 2010.

== Awards ==
- 1987 Lithuanian State Prize
