= Tom Ryan (Australian footballer) =

Australian rules footballer (1924–2017)

Personal information
- Full name: Thomas Clifford Ryan
- Born: 7 November 1924; Port Lincoln, South Australia
- Died: 24 February 2017 (aged 92); Tongala, Victoria, Australia
- Original team: South Adelaide
- Height: 173 cm (5 ft 8 in)
- Weight: 76 kg (168 lb)
- Position: Back Pocket / Rover

Playing career^{1}
Years	Club	Games (Goals)
1948–52	South Melbourne	61 (3)
- ^{1} Playing statistics correct to the end of 1952.

Tom Ryan (7 November 1924 – 24 February 2017) was an Australian rules footballer who played with South Melbourne in the Victorian Football League (VFL).

Ryan was appointed coach of Stanhope - Girgarre Football Club in 1953 and coached them until 1955.
