= Matt Baker (horse trainer) =

American Quarter Horse trainer and jockey

Personal information
- Born: March 26, 1955 Columbus, Georgia
- Died: February 7, 2017 (aged 61) Lafayette, Louisiana
- Occupations: Jockey, horse trainer

Horse racing career
- Sport: Horse racing
- Career wins: 790

Major racing wins
- Old South Futurity (1981); Sound of Summer Derby (1990); Lazy E Nat'l QH Jockey 400 Championship (1991); Lassie Futurity (1994); Yellow Rose Stakes (1999); Hipodromo de Las Americas Stakes (2000); Las Colinas Stakes (2000); Sam Houston Futurity (2000); TQHA Sale Futurity (2000); Gulf Coast Stakes (2000); Sundowner Trailer Stakes (2000); Governor's Cup Marathon (2005); Barnmaster Sprint Stakes (2005); Texas Distance Challenge (2005, 2006); LQHBA Breeders Futurity (2006); AQHA Distance Challenge Championship (2006); Delta Dash Stakes (2006)

Significant horses
- Johnny Vittoro, Shining Sky, Cash To The Front, Mr Bar Code, My Prince of Strides, Strider Man, Editor's Note, Jack Zee Quick, MM Magnum, First Down Toro, Destirona, Miss de Great
- Updated on May 9, 2014

Matt Baker (1955 – 2017) was an American Quarter Horse trainer and jockey.

== Early life ==
Maddox "Matt" Lafayette Baker was born on March 26, 1955, in Columbus, Georgia and died on February 7, 2017. He grew up in Texas, graduating from Deer Park High School in 1974. As a teenager he was a jockey in east Texas and began his training career shortly thereafter.

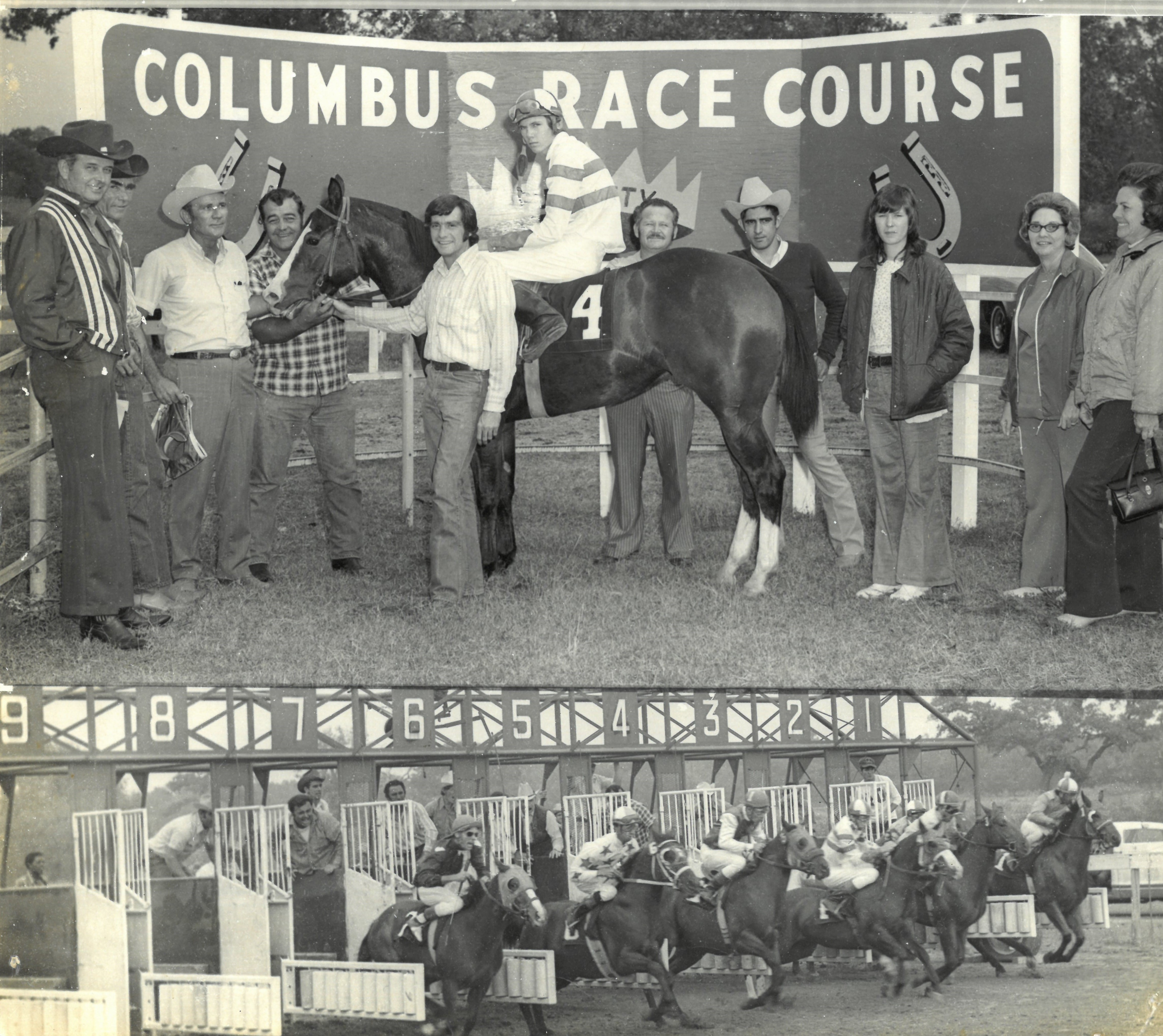

== Racing career ==
Based in Louisiana and Texas, from 1974 to 2007 Baker saddled 4,088 horses, compiling a record of 790 wins, including 17 stakes victories in Texas and Louisiana. His top earner was First Down Toro, who won the 2006 LQHBA Breeders Futurity at Evangeline Downs. He won the 2000 TQHA Sale Futurity with Cash To the Front and had multiple stakes wins with Prince of Strides, Jack Zee Quick, Strider Man and Mr Bar Code.

Other notable racehorses trained by Baker include past AQHA Champions Johnny Vittoro, and Shining Sky.

== Awards ==
In 2005, Baker was awarded the Texas Department of Public Safety's Director's Award after rescuing a toddler from a submerging car that had driven off the road and into a pond on his ranch.

- Multiple Graded Stakes winning trainer
- 1981 Leading Trainer, Delta Downs
- "Million-Dollar Trainer" Speedhorse Magazine

== Posthumous Honors ==
Matt Baker Memorial Race at Delta Downs

- May 12, 2017
  - Winner: Strong Guns, owned by Lester Colomb Jr., trained by Kenneth Weeks, and ridden by Damian Martinez.
- May 26, 2018
  - Winner: Dashing Padre, owned by Rodney Verret, trained by Kenneth Roberts Sr., and ridden by Noe Castaneda.
- May 18, 2019
  - Winner: TBD

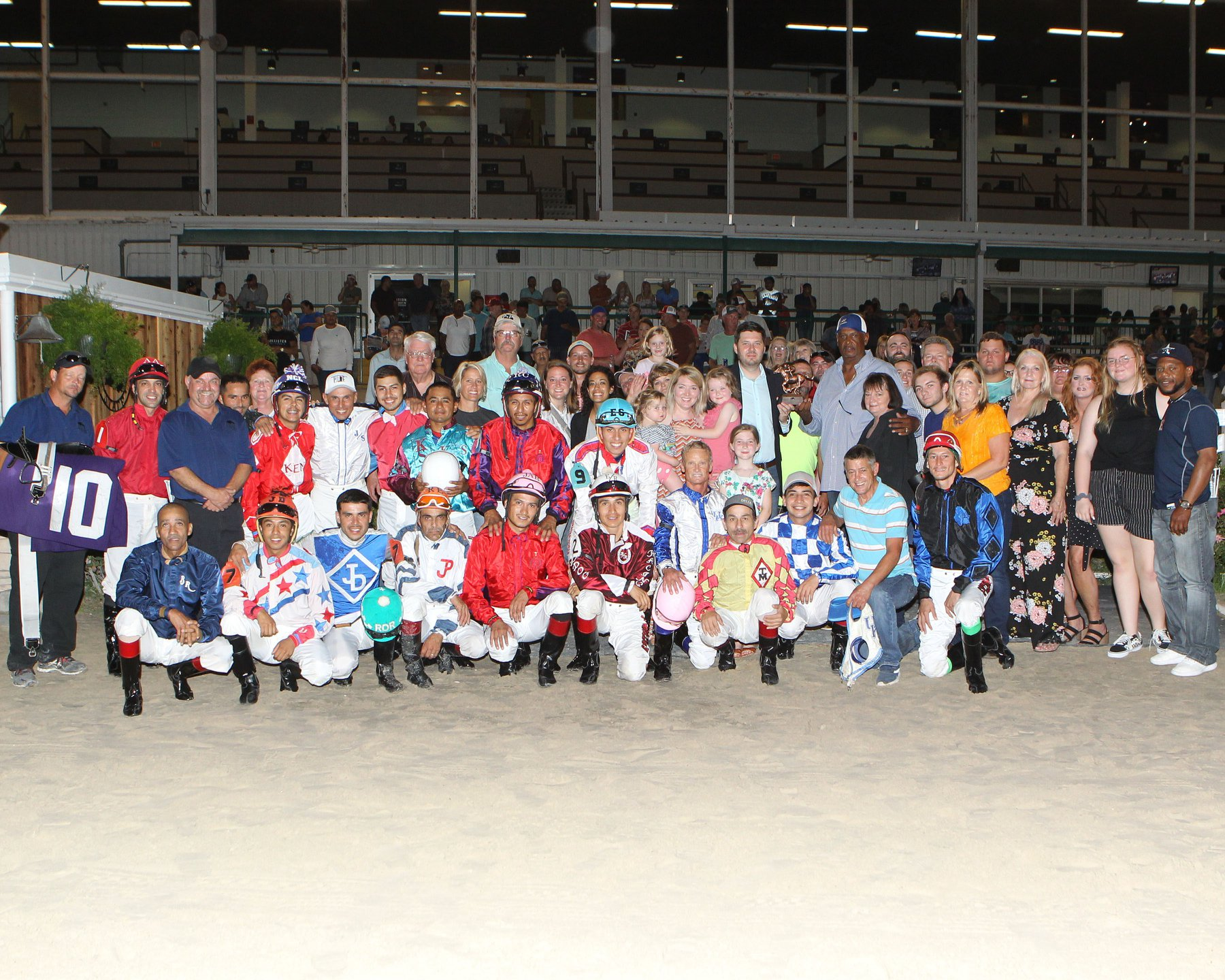
Win picture for the 2018 running of the Matt Baker Memorial
