= John Rote (field hockey) =

American field hockey player

Personal information
- Nationality: American
- Born: March 24, 1928 Bloemendaal, Netherlands
- Died: February 13, 2017 (aged 88) Manchester, Connecticut, United States

Sport
- Sport: Field hockey

John Rote (March 24, 1928 – February 13, 2017) was an American field hockey player. Originally from the Netherlands, he was educated at Wadham College in Oxford. Rote later moved to the United States and was selected for the United States men's national field hockey team that contested the men's tournament at the 1956 Summer Olympics. Living for a period in Connecticut, he was active politically and was a publicity director for Connecticut Citizens for Eisenhower, a group which advocated for Dwight D. Eisenhower during the 1956 United States presidential election in Connecticut. From 1957 to 1963, Rote was chairperson of "The Privateers", an organization which originated with the 1956 US Olympic field hockey team and sought to "develop the sport worldwide".
