= Ronald T. Halverson =

American politician and businessman

Ronald Tomlinson Halvorson (December 18, 1936 – February 24, 2017) was an American politician and businessman.

Halvorson was born and raised in Ogden, Utah. He attended what is now Weber State University and then studied at the University of Utah. He was president of the Halverson Mechanical Inc. Halverson was a member of the Church of Jesus Christ of Latter-day Saints. He served a mission for the LDS church in Norway during which he served as a counselor in the mission presidency.

He served in the Utah House of Representatives from 1967 to 1978 and then served in the Utah State Senate from 1978 to 1982. Halverson was a Republican.

Halvorson served as a stake president and regional representative in the LDS Church. In the early 1990s he served as president of the Norway Oslo Mission. He was called as a general authority in 1998 and served in that position until 2006.
