= Sam Summerlin =

American journalist, author and foreign correspondent

- Born: January 1, 1928; Chapel Hill, North Carolina, US
- Died: February 27, 2017; Carlsbad, California, US
- Education: University of North Carolina
- Occupation: War correspondent
- Employer(s): Associated Press; New York Times
- Known for: First person to report the end of the Korean War

Sam Summerlin (January 1, 1928 – February 27, 2017) was an American journalist, author and foreign correspondent. He was best known for his time as an Associated Press correspondent from 1949 to 1975. On July 27, 1953, while working as an AP war correspondent, Summerlin became the first journalist to report on the signing of the Korean Armistice Agreement which ended the Korean War.

He was born in Chapel Hill, North Carolina, on January 1, 1928. He received his bachelor's degree from the University of North Carolina before joining the staff of the Associated Press as a journalist in 1949. In 1951, the AP sent him to cover the Korean War as a foreign correspondent when he was 23-years old, becoming one of the youngest journalists to cover the conflict.

Summerlin left the Associated Press in 1975 to take the position of president and chairman of the news service and syndicate at the New York Times. He also authored several books, including The China Cloud and Latin America: Land of Revolution.

Summerlin was also the recipient of the Maria Moors Cabot award given by Columbia University to journalist for the advancement of understanding for the people of Latin America and the Caribbean. While stationed in Havana, Cuba Summerlin became well acquainted with Fidel Castro and Ernest Hemingway. Summerlin was the person responsible for informing Hemingway of his being awarded the Nobel Prize for literature for The Old Man and the Sea.

Sam Summerlin died from complications of Parkinson's disease at a nursing home in Carlsbad, California, on February 27, 2017, at the age of 89.
