= Deaths in August 2018 =

The following is a list of notable deaths in August 2018.

Entries for each day are listed alphabetically by surname. A typical entry lists information in the following sequence:

- Name, age, country of citizenship at birth, subsequent country of citizenship (if applicable), reason for notability, cause of death (if known), and reference.

== August 2018 ==
=== 1 ===
- Alija Behmen, 77, Bosnian politician, PM of Bosnia and Herzegovina federation (2001–2003) and Mayor of Sarajevo (2009–2013).
- Garnet Bloomfield, 89, Canadian politician, MP for London—Middlesex (1980–1984).
- Gaqo Çako, 83, Albanian opera singer.
- Mary Carlisle, 104, American actress (College Humor, Doctor Rhythm, Dead Men Walk).
- Maruja Carrasco, 74, Spanish botanist, herbalist and academic (Complutense University of Madrid, University of Chicago).
- David I. Cleland, 92, American engineer and writer.
- John Cornwall, 83, Australian politician.
- Mário Cravo Júnior, 95, Brazilian sculptor, designer, and painter.
- Cui Xiuwen, 50–51, Chinese artist.
- Saralyn R. Daly, 94, American writer and translator.
- Jack Gaffney, 88, Australian footballer (Fitzroy) and lawyer.
- Rick Genest, 32, Canadian fashion model and actor (Carny, 47 Ronin), fall.
- Howard Grant, 79, American jockey.
- Jan Kirsznik, 84, Polish rock saxophonist.
- Eleonore Koch, 92, German-born Brazilian painter and sculptor.
- Frédéric Kyburz, 74, Swiss Olympic judoka.
- Fakir Musafar, 87, American performance artist and modern primitive proponent, lung cancer.
- Jüri Rätsep, 83, Estonian politician and judge, magistrate of the Supreme Court (1993–2002).
- Celeste Rodrigues, 95, Portuguese fado singer.
- Hasanaga Sadigov, 67, Azerbaijani ashik musician, cancer.
- Jakob Schönenberger, 86, Swiss oberst, banker (Swiss National Bank) and politician, member of Council of States (1979–1991).
- Jalees Sherwani, 70, Indian screenwriter and lyricist.
- Bhishma Narain Singh, 85, Indian politician, Governor of Assam (1984–1989) and Tamil Nadu (1991–1993).
- John Tangi, 67, Niuean-born Cook Island politician.
- Nancy Tuckerman, 89, American secretary, White House Social Secretary (1963), chronic obstructive pulmonary disease.
- Umbayee, 66, Indian ghazal singer, cancer.
- Rolf Valtin, 93, American soccer player.
- Hannie van Leeuwen, 92, Dutch politician, Senator (1995–2007).
- Stefano Vetrano, 95, Italian politician, Deputy (1968–1975).
- Taylor Whitley, 38, American football player (Miami Dolphins, Denver Broncos, Washington Redskins).
- Rotraut Wisskirchen, 82, German biblical archaeologist and academic, Order of Merit (2011).

=== 2 ===
- Neil Argo, 71, American composer (Wild America, Mission: Impossible), heart failure.
- Shaharuddin Badaruddin, 55, Malaysian politician, colon cancer.
- Bob Berry, 102, New Zealand dendrologist.
- A. K. Bose, 69, Indian politician, cardiac arrest.
- Marcial, 77, Brazilian footballer.
- Givi Chikvanaia, 79, Georgian water polo player, Olympic silver medalist (1960, 1968).
- Gabriel Covarrubias Ibarra, 88, Mexican politician, Senator (1997–2000), Mayor of Guadalajara (1989–1992).
- Tom Cox, 88, British politician, MP for Wandsworth Central (1970–1974) and Tooting (1974–2005).
- Armand de Las Cuevas, 50, French racing cyclist, suicide.
- Harald Hauptmann, 82, Czech-born German prehistorian, archaeologist and academic (Heidelberg University), member of Serbian Academy of Sciences and Arts.
- Jon Hohman, 75, American football player (Hamilton Tiger-Cats, Denver Broncos).
- Yogi Huyghebaert, 74, Canadian politician, Saskatchewan MLA (2000–2016).
- Brian Kelly, 75, English footballer.
- Herbert King, 55, Colombian actor (Pasión de Gavilanes, Guajira, Loving Pablo), heart attack.
- Salvatore Meleleo, 89, Italian politician, Deputy (1983–1994) and Senator (2001–2006).
- Winston Ntshona, 76, South African actor (Marigolds in August) and playwright (The Island, Sizwe Banzi Is Dead), Tony winner (1975).
- Vladimír Plaček, 53, Czech politician and physician, Senator (since 2012).
- Mihai Radu Pricop, 68, Romanian politician, Senator (2000–2004).
- Uusarqak Qujaukitsoq, 70, Greenlandic Inuk politician and human rights activist, member of the Inatsisartut (1984–1995).
- Heinz Rökker, 97, German night fighter pilot during World War II.
- Daan Schrijvers, 76, Dutch footballer (national team, AFC DWS, PSV Eindhoven, NAC Breda).
- Alberto Spinola, 75, Italian Olympic water polo player.
- Darrel Sutton, 71, Canadian curler.
- Eric Torell, 20, man with Down syndrome who was shot by Swedish police.
- Viktor Tyumenev, 61, Russian ice hockey player, Olympic champion (1984).
- María José la Valenciana, 44, Spanish transsexual sex worker and internet personality.
- Bill Wattenburg, 82, American engineer, author, and radio talk show host, cancer.
- Ferdinand Willeit, 79, Italian politician, Deputy (1987–1992), heart attack.

=== 3 ===
- Matija Barl, 78, Slovene actor (Kekec).
- Joseph C. Burke, 86, American educator and academic, President of the State University of New York at Plattsburgh (1974–1986).
- Terry Bush, 75, English footballer (Bristol City).
- Carlos Buttice, 75, Argentine footballer (Unión Española, Bahia, CASLA).
- Raffaele Castielli, 91, Italian Roman Catholic prelate, Bishop of Lucera–Troia (1987–1996).
- Carlos Chávez, 59, Bolivian football administrator, cancer.
- June Holeman, 75, American barrel racer.
- Ingrid Espelid Hovig, 94, Norwegian television chef and cookbook author.
- Cliff Huxford, 81, English football player (Southampton, Exeter City) and manager.
- Koulla Kakoulli, 56, British musician, dominatrix and bodybuilder.
- Reinhart Langer, 97, German-born New Zealand plant physiologist and academic (Lincoln University).
- John Loone, 87, Australian politician, member of the Tasmanian Legislative Council (1989–2001).
- Murray Matthewson, 73, New Zealand hand surgeon.
- Moshé Mizrahi, 86, Egyptian-born Israeli film director (Madame Rosa, Every Time We Say Goodbye, The House on Chelouche Street), Oscar winner (1978).
- John Schella, 71, Canadian ice hockey player (Vancouver Canucks, Houston Aeros).
- Zbigniew Ścibor-Rylski, 101, Polish Air Force officer (Warsaw Uprising) and brigadier general.
- Piotr Szulkin, 68, Polish film director (The War of the Worlds: Next Century, O-Bi, O-Ba: The End of Civilization).
- Ronnie Taylor, 93, British cinematographer (Gandhi, Cry Freedom, A Chorus Line), Oscar winner (1983).
- Zhang Baosheng, 57–58, Chinese qigong master.

=== 4 ===
- Sergey Ambartsumian, 96, Armenian scientist, member of Supreme Soviet of the Soviet Union (1979–1984).
- Afsar Amed, 58, Indian Bengali writer.
- Frederick Barnes, 93, Australian air vice marshal.
- Lorrie Collins, 76, American rockabilly singer (The Collins Kids).
- Delwyn Costello, 58, New Zealand cricketer.
- Lluïsa Forrellad, 91, Spanish writer.
- Stephen Goodson, South African banker and Holocaust denier, Director of the Reserve Bank (2003–2012).
- Leonard Patrick Harvey, 89, British historian.
- Donald Hunt, 88, British choral conductor.
- Brian Illman, 80, Australian cricketer.
- Alan Jackson, 82, Australian businessman, director of Nylex.
- Samizu Matsuki, 82, Japanese-born American painter.
- Anita Miller, 91, American author and publisher, co-founder of Academy Chicago Publishers.
- Josy Moinet, 88, French politician, Senator for Charente-Maritime (1973–1989), Mayor of Saint-Rogatien (1959–2008).
- James Morrison, 82, New Zealand cricketer.
- Tommy Peoples, 70, Irish fiddler (The Bothy Band).
- Arsène Tchakarian, 101, Armenian-born French resistance fighter (FTP-MOI).
- Karma Topden, 77, Indian Sikkimese politician, member of the Rajya Sabha (1988–1993, 1994–2000), Ambassador to Mongolia.
- Masahiko Tsugawa, 78, Japanese actor (Otoko wa Tsurai yo, Godzilla, Mothra and King Ghidorah: Giant Monsters All-Out Attack, Tampopo).
- N. Frank Ukadike, 67-68, American film historian.
- Myron White, 61, American baseball player (Los Angeles Dodgers).

=== 5 ===
- Majid Al-Majid, 52, Saudi folk singer, shot.
- Bernard F. Burke, 90, American astronomer.
- Miguel Ángel Campano, 70, Spanish painter.
- Ulises Aurelio Casiano Vargas, 84, Puerto Rican Roman Catholic prelate, Bishop of Mayagüez (1976–2011).
- Barry Chuckle, 73, English children's entertainer (ChuckleVision), bone cancer.
- Rodolfo de la Garza, 75, American political scientist.
- Robert Dugard, 76, British speedway rider and promoter.
- Tom Heckert Jr., 51, American football executive (Cleveland Browns, Philadelphia Eagles), amyloidosis.
- David Landsberg, 73, American actor (C.P.O. Sharkey, Shoot the Moon) and screenwriter (Cosby), complications from surgery.
- Gerry Lenfest, 88, American media executive (Triangle Publications, TelVue) and philanthropist (Columbia University).
- Ellen Joyce Loo, 32, Canadian-born Hong Kong singer (at17), suicide by jumping.
- Harry Mares, 79, American politician, member of the Minnesota House of Representatives (1995–2002).
- Lauri Mononen, 68, Finnish Olympic ice hockey player (1972).
- Alan Rabinowitz, 64, American conservationist and zoologist, founder president of Panthera Corporation, leukemia.
- Charlotte Rae, 92, American actress (The Facts of Life, Diff'rent Strokes, 101 Dalmatians: The Series), bone cancer.
- Bob Sadowski, 80, American baseball player (Milwaukee Braves, Boston Red Sox).
- Aji Muhammad Salehuddin II, 93, Indonesian royal, Sultan of Kutai (since 1999).
- Roy Schafer, 95, American psychologist and psychoanalyst.
- John Shaw, 86, Australian cricketer.
- Matthew Sweeney, 65, Irish poet, motor neurone disease.
- Mitsuteru Tanaka, 46, Japanese Olympic cyclist.
- Nev Warburton, 86, Australian politician, Leader of the Opposition of Queensland (1984–1988).
- Mary E. White, 92, South African-born Australian paleobotanist and author, homicide by overdose.

=== 6 ===
- Patricia Benoit, 91, American actress (Mister Peepers).
- Kamrul Hasan Bhuiyan, 66, Bangladeshi military officer and writer.
- Rosa Maria Carrasco i Azemar, 82, Spanish politician, co-founder of Democrats of Catalonia.
- Anthony Catt, 84, English cricketer (Kent).
- R. K. Dhawan, 81, Indian politician.
- Robert Dix, 83, American actor (Forbidden Planet, Forty Guns, The Rebel Rousers), respiratory failure.
- William H. Faucher, 80, American politician.
- Martin Galvin, 81, American poet.
- Christian Habicht, 92, German historian (Ancient Greece).
- Margaret Heckler, 87, American politician and diplomat, Ambassador to Ireland (1986–1989), Secretary of Health and Human Services (1983–1985), member of the U.S. House of Representatives (1967–1983), cardiac arrest.
- Nat Indrapana, 80, Thai sports executive, Vice Minister of Tourism and Sports (2007–2008), Vice President of the World Taekwondo Federation (1999–2009).
- Jimmy il Fenomeno, 86, Italian actor.
- Nicole Kullen, 38, Australian Paralympic equestrian, meningococcal disease.
- Paul Laxalt, 96, American politician, Governor of Nevada (1967–1971), member of the U.S. Senate (1974–1987).
- Leonard Lewinsohn, 64–65, American Islamic scholar.
- Helen Mackenzie, 88, New Zealand swimmer.
- Sanaa Mazhar, 85, Egyptian actress.
- Robert A. Plane, 90, American chemist, vintner and academic administrator, President of Clarkson University (1974–1985) and Wells College (1991–1995), founder of Cayuga Lake AVA.
- Pete Richens, 65, English screenwriter (The Comic Strip Presents).
- Joël Robuchon, 73, French chef and cookbook author, Meilleur Ouvrier de France winner 1976, complications from pancreatic cancer.
- William E. Schluter, 90, American politician, member of the New Jersey Legislature (1968–1974, 1987–2002).
- Anya Krugovoy Silver, 49, American poet, breast cancer.
- Dennis Thrower, 80, English footballer (Ipswich Town).

=== 7 ===
- Étienne Chicot, 69, French actor (The Da Vinci Code) and composer.
- John Ciaccia, 85, Italian-born Canadian politician, member of the National Assembly of Quebec for Mont-Royal (1973–1998).
- David Coates, 71, British political economist.
- Andrew Coburn, 86, American author.
- John Doaninoel, 68, Papua New Guinean Roman Catholic prelate, Auxiliary Bishop of Honiara (since 2011).
- Dumitru Fărcaș, 80, Romanian tárogató player.
- Arvonne Fraser, 92, American women's rights activist, Ambassador to the United Nations Commission on the Status of Women (1993–1994).
- Gustavo Giagnoni, 86, Italian football player (Mantova) and manager (Milan, Roma).
- Nan Joyce, 77–78, Irish human rights activist (Irish Travellers).
- M. Karunanidhi, 94, Indian politician and writer, Chief Minister of Tamil Nadu (1969–1971, 1971–1976, 1989–1991, 1996–2001, 2006–2011), multiple organ failure.
- Richard H. Kline, 91, American cinematographer (King Kong, Star Trek: The Motion Picture, Camelot).
- Anton Lehmden, 89, Austrian painter.
- Liu Guangding, 88, Chinese marine geologist, member of the Chinese Academy of Sciences.
- Stan Mikita, 78, Slovak-born Canadian Hall of Fame ice hockey player (Chicago Blackhawks, St. Catharines Teepees), NHL champion (1961).
- Aaron Monsonego, 90, Moroccan religious leader, Chief Rabbi (since 1994).
- Enno Patalas, 88, German film historian, restorer and collector.
- Joel H. Silbey, 84, American historian.
- Rika Vagiani, 56, Greek actress, journalist and writer, lung cancer.
- Gerald Weinberg, 84, American computer scientist.
- Robley Wilson, 88, American writer.

=== 8 ===
- Mario Alinei, 91, Italian linguist.
- Nicholas Bett, 28, Kenyan hurdler, world champion (2015), traffic collision.
- Göran Bundy, 97, Swedish diplomat, Ambassador to Kuwait, Qatar, Bahrain and United Arab Emirates (1977–1980) and Iran (1980–1985).
- Katie Cannon, 68, American theologian, leukemia.
- Ronald Crawford, 82, Australian Olympic racewalker (1956, 1960, 1964).
- Arthur Davies, 77, Welsh opera singer.
- Willie Dille, 53, Dutch politician, member of the House of Representatives (2010–2012), suicide.
- Wendell Erickson, 93, American politician, member of the Minnesota House of Representatives (1965–1987).
- Pál Fábry, 99, Hungarian politician, MNA (1947).
- Robert Hugh Ferrell, 97, American historian and author.
- John Glines, 84, American theatre producer (Torch Song Trilogy, As Is, Whoop-Dee-Doo!) and playwright.
- Xenia Gratsos, 78, Greek-American actress.
- Dave Hargreaves, 63, English footballer (Accrington Stanley).
- Jarrod Lyle, 36, Australian golfer, acute myeloid leukaemia.
- Hernán Masanés, 86, Chilean Olympic cyclist.
- Takeshi Onaga, 67, Japanese politician, Governor of Okinawa Prefecture (since 2014), Mayor of Naha (2000–2014), pancreatic cancer.
- Élise Paré-Tousignant, 81, Canadian music administrator and educator.
- Pro, 37, South African rapper and DJ, hemosuccus pancreaticus.
- Philip Riteman, 96, Polish-born Canadian lecturer and Holocaust survivor.
- Richard Searby, 87, Australian lawyer.
- Mikhail Shakhov, 86, Ukrainian wrestler, Olympic bronze medalist (1956).
- Richard Sipe, 85, American sociologist, multiple organ failure.

=== 9 ===
- Tamara Degtyaryova, 74, Russian actress (Eternal Call, Nikolai Vavilov).
- Donald F. Holcomb, 92, American physicist.
- Scott Imler, 60, American cannabis activist.
- Billy Ray Irick, 59, American convicted murderer, execution by lethal injection.
- John Kennedy, 77, American baseball player (Boston Red Sox, Los Angeles Dodgers, Washington Senators).
- John D. P. Meldrum, 78, British mathematician.
- Manfred Melzer, 74, German Roman Catholic prelate, Auxiliary Bishop of Cologne (1995–2015).
- Mehrdad Pahlbod, 101, Iranian royal and politician, Minister of Culture and Art (1964–1978).
- Carol Springer, 81, American politician, State Treasurer of Arizona (1998–2003).

=== 10 ===
- Emmanuel C. Aguma, Nigerian politician, Attorney General of Rivers State (since 2015).
- Anant Bajaj, 41, Indian businessman (Bajaj Electricals), heart attack.
- Peter Berck, 68, American economist.
- Andrey Budnik, 65, Soviet-Russian diplomat, Ambassador to Pakistan (2009–2013) and Nepal (since 2015).
- Paul Cantor, 76, Canadian lawyer.
- William Corbett, 75, American poet, pancreatic cancer.
- László Fábián, 82, Hungarian sprint canoeist, Olympic (1956) and world champion (1958, 1963, 1966).
- Árpád Fazekas, 88, Hungarian footballer (national team, FC Bayern Munich).
- Robert J. LeRoy, 74, Canadian chemist.
- Fernando Llort, 69, Salvadoran artist.
- Dawn Mabalon, 45, American academic, asthma attack.
- Mahmut Makal, 88, Turkish writer.
- Jim McKiernan, 73, Irish-born Australian politician, Senator (1984–2002), cancer.
- Katherine Nelson, 87–88, American psychologist.
- A. R. Schwartz, 92, American politician, member of the Texas House of Representatives (1955–1959) and Senate (1960–1981), heart attack.
- Kin Sugai, 92, Japanese actress (Godzilla, Dodes'ka-den, The Funeral), heart failure.
- Steve Travis, 67, American professional wrestler (WWF).
- Mohammed Awad al-Zayyud, 62, Jordanian politician, Secretary-General of Islamic Action Front, cancer.

=== 11 ===
- James H. Baxter Jr., 94, American politician.
- Bùi Tín, 90, Vietnamese military officer and dissident, kidney failure.
- Pierre Coustillas, 88, French literary scholar (George Gissing) and academic (University of Lille).
- Terry A. Davis, 48, American computer programmer (TempleOS), struck by train.
- Art Griffiths, 93, Canadian Olympic rower.
- Morris G. Hallock, 92, American politician, member of the South Dakota House of Representatives (1953–1954, 1967–1968).
- Kazimierz Karabasz, 88, Polish documentarian.
- Stanley Keleman, 86, American writer and chiropractor.
- Li Chaoyi, 84, Chinese neurobiologist, academician of the Chinese Academy of Sciences.
- Benno Müller-Hill, 85, German biologist and author.
- Sir V. S. Naipaul, 85, Trinidadian-born British writer (A House for Mr Biswas), Nobel Prize laureate (2001).
- Fabio Mamerto Rivas Santos, 86, Dominican Roman Catholic prelate, Bishop of Barahona (1976–1999).
- John Smyth, 77, British barrister, heart attack.
- Manch Wheeler, 79, American football player (Buffalo Bills).

=== 12 ===
- Fariha Al-Ahmad, 74, Kuwaiti royal (House of Al Sabah) and philanthropist.
- Samir Amin, 86, Egyptian-French Marxian economist.
- Richard Lloyd Anderson, 92, American LDS Church historian (Brigham Young University).
- Peter Chadwick, 87, British applied mathematician and physicist.
- Rio Fanning, 86, Northern Irish actor (The District Nurse, Priest) and television writer (EastEnders), complications from Alzheimer's disease.
- Bryant Giles, 90, Australian politician, MP (1968–1970).
- Betty Gray, 96, Welsh table tennis player.
- Ma Jin, 83, Chinese geophysicist and structural geologist.
- Thomas J. Moran, 65, American executive (Mutual of America) and humanitarian (Concern Worldwide), Chancellor of Queen's University Belfast (since 2015).
- Willy Rasmussen, 80, Norwegian Olympic javelin thrower (1960).
- Michael Scott Rohan, 67, Scottish fantasy and science fiction author.
- Steven T. Ross, 81, American military historian.
- Wilfred Sircus, 98, British gastroenterologist.
- Kazimiera Utrata, 86, Polish actress.
- John Veevers, 87, Australian geologist.

=== 13 ===
- Mark Baker, 71, American actor (Candide, Via Galactica, Swashbuckler).
- Zvonko Bego, 77, Croatian footballer (Hajduk Split, Yugoslavia national team), Olympic champion (1960).
- John Calder, 91, Canadian-born British publisher (Calder Publishing).
- Morlaye Camara, 81–82, Guinean Olympic footballer.
- Shirley Aley Campbell, 93, American painter.
- Salvatore Cantalupo, 59, Italian actor (Gomorrah).
- John Carter, 95, American film editor (The Heartbreak Kid, Friday, Men of Honor).
- Somnath Chatterjee, 89, Indian politician, Speaker of the Lok Sabha (2004–2009), multiple organ failure.
- Tajul Islam Choudhury, 73, Bangladeshi politician, Opposition Chief Whip of Jatiya Sangsad.
- Paul Coppejans, 84, Belgian Olympic pole vaulter.
- Ian Dean, 48, English professional wrestler (ASW, WCW, NJPW), heart attack.
- Santiago María García de la Rasilla, 81, Spanish-born Peruvian Roman Catholic prelate, Vicar Apostolic of Jaén en Perú (2005–2014).
- Don Garrison, 93, American politician, member of the Texas House of Representatives (1961–1966).
- Giam Choo Kwee, 76, Singaporean chess player.
- Sir Alan Greengross, 89, British politician, lung cancer.
- Georges Hausemer, 61, Luxembourgish writer.
- Unshō Ishizuka, 67, Japanese voice actor (Pokémon, JoJo's Bizarre Adventure, Cowboy Bebop), colon infection.
- Sonia Keys, 57, American amateur astronomer, cancer.
- Mie Mie, 46, Burmese democracy activist, traffic collision.
- Powell A. Moore, 80, American government official.
- Ann Moss, 80, British literary historian.
- Gerald Nazareth, 86, Hong Kong judge, Non-Permanent Judge of the Court of Final Appeal (1997–2012).
- Jim Neidhart, 63, American professional wrestler (WWF, Mid-South, Stampede), head injury from fall.
- Rico Pontvianne, 74, Mexican Olympic basketball player (1964, 1968), Pan American championship silver medalist (1967).
- Miguel Ángel Sanz Bocos, 100, Spanish fighter pilot, last living aviator of the Civil War.
- Golam Sarwar, 75, Bangladeshi journalist and founding editor of Samakal.
- Bob Seaman, 86, American football coach.
- Ola Skanks, 91, Canadian dancer and choreographer.
- Laura Spong, 92, American painter.
- Gyula Szabó, 70, Hungarian Olympic sports shooter.

=== 14 ===
- Brief Truce, 29, Irish racehorse.
- Chemmanam Chacko, 92, Indian poet.
- Sir Hugh Cortazzi, 94, British diplomat, Ambassador to Japan (1980–1984).
- Charles Victor Grahmann, 87, American Roman Catholic prelate, Bishop of Dallas (1990–2007).
- Mela Hudson, 31, American actress (Split Costs, Men in Black 3) and filmmaker.
- Jill Janus, 42, American rock singer (Huntress), suicide.
- Tomasz Jędrzejak, 39, Polish motorcycle speedway rider (national team), suspected suicide.
- Itai Keisuke, 62, Japanese sumo wrestler.
- Jean Kittrell, 91, American jazz pianist and singer.
- Valentina Levko, 92, Russian opera and chamber singer.
- Michael Persinger, 73, American-born Canadian psychology professor, neuroscience researcher (Laurentian University) and ufologist.
- Mary Pratt, 83, Canadian painter.
- Randy Rampage, 58, Canadian thrash metal singer and bassist (D.O.A., Annihilator, Stress Factor 9), heart attack.
- Hakam Singh, 64, Indian race walker, Asian Games champion (1978), liver and kidney disease.
- Balram Das Tandon, 90, Indian politician, Governor of Chhattisgarh (since 2014).
- Mario Trebbi, 78, Italian footballer (Milan, Torino, national team).
- Eduard Uspensky, 80, Russian author (Uncle Fedya, His Dog, and His Cat) and screenwriter (Gena the Crocodile, Plasticine Crow).

=== 15 ===
- Malik Ghulam Abbas, 60, Pakistani politician, heart attack.
- Kunihiro Abe, 50, Japanese animator (Gundam).
- Rita Borsellino, 73, Italian anti-Mafia activist and politician, MEP (2009–2014), cancer.
- Kenneth Bowles, 89, American computer scientist.
- Peter Box, 86, Australian footballer (Footscray).
- Martin Brandon-Bravo, 86, British politician, MP for Nottingham South (1983–1992).
- Marie-Françoise Bucquet, 80, French pianist and teacher.
- Pierre Camou, 72, French rugby union administrator.
- Robert Everett, 97, American computer scientist.
- Peter Fisher, 67, British physician, traffic collision.
- François Garnier, 74, French Roman Catholic prelate, Archbishop of Cambrai (since 2000).
- Edmond Haan, 94, French footballer (Strasbourg, national team).
- Abu Bakr al-Jazaeri, 97, Algerian Islamic scholar and writer.
- Vivian Matalon, 88, British theatre director.
- Albert Millaire, 83, Canadian actor (Tartuffe, Le Misanthrope, Dom Juan), cancer.
- Stuart Mitchell, 52, Scottish pianist and composer, lung cancer.
- Allan Rune Pettersson, 82, Swedish author.
- Marisa Porcel, 74, Spanish actress (Escenas de matrimonio, Aquí no hay quien viva, Médico de familia).
- Sir John Shipley Rowlinson, 92, British chemist.
- Momoko Sakura, 53, Japanese manga artist (Chibi Maruko-chan, Coji-Coji), breast cancer.
- Sterling Stuckey, 86, American historian.
- Joy Thompson, 94, Australian botanist.
- Ajit Wadekar, 77, Indian cricketer (Bombay, national team), cancer.

=== 16 ===
- David Campion Acheson, 96, American attorney.
- Benny Andersen, 88, Danish author, poet and pianist.
- Michael Bettaney, 68, British MI5 agent and spy for the Soviet Union.
- George Athan Billias, 99, American historian.
- Glen Chin, 70, American actor (50 First Dates, Naked Gun 33 1/3: The Final Insult, Natural Born Killers).
- Mohamed Demagh, 88, Algerian sculptor.
- Donald E. Edwards, 81, American military officer and politician.
- Aretha Franklin, 76, American Hall of Fame singer ("Respect", "Chain of Fools", "A Natural Woman"), pianist and songwriter, 18-time Grammy winner, pancreatic cancer.
- Arne Johansson, 91, Swedish Olympic cyclist (1952).
- Kim Yong-chun, 82, North Korean military officer and politician, Deputy (1986–1988), Chief of the KPA General Staff (1995–2007), heart attack.
- Gavri Levy, 80, Israeli dancer and choreographer, Chairman of the Israel Football Association (1996–2003).
- Hermann Lingnau, 81, German Olympic shot putter.
- Michael McGuire, 92, British politician, MP for Ince (1964–1983) and Makerfield (1983–1987).
- Count Prince Miller, 83, Jamaican-born British singer and actor (Desmond's), cancer.
- Joseph Minj, 87, Indian Roman Catholic prelate, Bishop of Simdega (1993–2008).
- Samir Salameh, 74, Palestinian-French visual artist.
- Warwick Selvey, 78, Australian Olympic discus thrower (1960).
- Yelena Shushunova, 49, Russian Hall of Fame gymnast, European (1985), World (1985, 1987), and Olympic champion (1988), complications from pneumonia.
- Atal Bihari Vajpayee, 93, Indian politician, Prime Minister (1996, 1998–2004), Minister of External Affairs (1977–1979), multiple organ failure.
- Wakako Yamauchi, 93, American playwright.
- Rafif al-Yasiri, 33, Iraqi plastic surgeon and television host, drug overdose.

=== 17 ===
- Bromley Armstrong, 92, Jamaican-born Canadian civil rights leader.
- Glen Ashman, 62, American lawyer.
- Bob Bass, 89, American basketball coach (Texas Tech Red Raiders) and executive (Charlotte Hornets, San Antonio Spurs), strokes.
- Graham Bond, 81, Australian Olympic gymnast (1956, 1960, 1964).
- Leonard Boswell, 84, American politician, member of the U.S. House of Representatives from Iowa's 3rd district (1997–2013), complications from pseudomyxoma peritonei.
- Rodney Cass, 78, English cricketer (Essex, Tasmania, Worcestershire).
- Jeremy Catto, 79, English historian.
- Ezzatolah Entezami, 94, Iranian actor (The Cow, Hajji Washington, Once Upon a Time, Cinema).
- Linton Freeman, 91, American sociologist.
- Bunky Henry, 74, American golfer, complications following heart surgery.
- Claudio Lolli, 68, Italian singer-songwriter, cancer.
- David McReynolds, 88, American pacifist (War Resisters League) and magazine editor (Liberation), fall.
- Paul Naumoff, 73, American football player (Detroit Lions).
- Anne-Li Norberg, 64, Swedish actress, cancer.
- Danny Pearson, 65, American R&B singer, liver cancer.
- Dennis Randall, 73, American football player (New York Jets, Cincinnati Bengals).
- Warwick Roger, 72, New Zealand journalist, founder of Metro magazine.
- Tom Roggeman, 86, American football player (Chicago Bears).
- Hardyal Singh, 90, Indian field hockey player, Olympic champion (1956).
- Sahar Taha, 61, Iraqi-born Lebanese musician and journalist.
- Sir Peter Tapsell, 88, British politician, MP (1959–1964, 1966–2015) and Father of the House of Commons (2010–2015).
- Mike Timm, 81, American politician, member of the North Dakota House of Representatives (1972–1986, 1988–2006) and Speaker of the North Dakota House of Representatives (1996–1998).
- Halima Xudoyberdiyeva, 71, Uzbekistani writer and poet.
- Kurt Walker, 64, American ice hockey player (Toronto Maple Leafs), sepsis.

=== 18 ===
- Kofi Annan, 80, Ghanaian diplomat, Secretary-General of the United Nations (1997–2006), Nobel Prize laureate (2001).
- Tom Clark, 77, American poet and biographer, traffic collision.
- Jack Costanzo, 98, American percussionist, complications from a ruptured aneurysm.
- Mieke Fortune, 41, Australian rugby union player, breast cancer.
- Eduard Frolov, 85, Russian historian.
- Gaetano Gifuni, 86, Italian civil servant, Secretary General of the President (1992–2006) and Minister for Parliamentary Relations (1987).
- Jim Hnatiuk, 67, Canadian politician.
- Costas Kondylis, 78, American architect.
- Hilary Lister, 46, British sailor, complications from reflex sympathetic dystrophy.
- Gabriel López Zapiain, 75, Mexican footballer (Irapuato, Guadalajara, national team).
- Charles L. Mader, 88, American physical chemist.
- John E. McCarthy, 88, American Roman Catholic prelate, Bishop of Austin (1985–2001).
- Ronnie Moore, 85, Australian-born New Zealand speedway rider, world champion (1954, 1959), lung cancer.
- Pedro Queiroz Pereira, 69, Portuguese natural resource magnate and Formula Two driver, chairman of The Navigator Company and Semapa, heart attack.
- Robert Todd, 55, American filmmaker.
- John Townend, 84, British politician, MP (1979–2001).
- Ozzie Van Brabant, 91, Canadian baseball player (Philadelphia/Kansas City Athletics).
- Chennupati Vidya, 84, Indian politician, MP for Vijayawada (1980–1984, 1989–1991), heart attack.
- Henk Wesseling, 81, Dutch historian.

=== 19 ===
- Khaira Arby, 59, Malian singer.
- Bazlur Rahman Badal, 95, Bangladeshi folk dancer, Independence Day Award recipient (2017), pneumonia as a complication of COPD.
- Vaughn Beals, 90, American businessman (Harley-Davidson).
- Alan Boyson, 87–88, English muralist and sculptor.
- Rafael Calventi, 86, Dominican architect and diplomat, heart attack.
- Edoardo Catellani, 96, Italian politician, Senator (1968–1979).
- Susan Ciriclio, 71, American photographer.
- Louis Gambaccini, 87, American civil servant, NJDOT commissioner, founding chairman of NJ Transit, general manager of SEPTA.
- Alastair Gillespie, 96, Canadian politician and businessman.
- Hong Chaosheng, 97, Chinese physicist, academician of the Chinese Academy of Sciences.
- Darrow Hooper, 86, American shot-putter, Olympic silver medal (1952).
- Miguel Irízar Campos, 84, Spanish Roman Catholic prelate, Bishop of Callao (1975–1995).
- Joe Landrum, 89, American baseball player (Brooklyn Dodgers).
- Margareta Niculescu, 92, Romanian artist, puppeteer, director and teacher.
- Margaret Reid, 95, New Zealand religious leader, moderator of the General Assembly of the Presbyterian Church of Aotearoa New Zealand (1987).
- Rosa Ríos, 83, Bolivian actress, stroke.
- Pedro Roncal, 56, Spanish journalist, heart attack.
- Rod Saddler, 52, American football player (St. Louis/Phoenix Cardinals, Cincinnati Bengals).
- Marisa Sánchez, 85, Spanish chef and gastronomist.
- Genie Shenk, 81, American artist.

=== 20 ===
- John N. Abrams, 71, American military officer, Commander of TRADOC (1998–2002).
- Matthew Aid, 60, American author and historian, heart disease.
- Richard D. Alexander, 88, American evolutionary biologist.
- Ted Atkins, 60, British mountaineer, climbing accident.
- Uri Avnery, 94, Israeli peace activist (Gush Shalom) and politician, member of the Knesset (1965–1974, 1979–1981), complications from a stroke.
- Andrés Aylwin, 93, Chilean politician and human rights activist, Deputy (1965–1973, 1990–1998).
- Turgut Berkes, 65, Turkish rock musician and artist.
- Charles Blackman, 90, Australian painter.
- Greg Boyed, 48, New Zealand television presenter (TVNZ).
- Ken Braddock, 79, Welsh rugby union player.
- Elizabeth Connell, 92, American gynecologist and obstetrician, heart failure.
- Sam Cornish, 82, American poet.
- Doc Edwards, 81, American baseball player (Kansas City Athletics) and manager (Cleveland Indians).
- Ottó Heinek, 58, Hungarian politician and journalist, Chairman of the National Self-Government of Germans in Hungary (since 1999).
- Jean Létourneau, 97, tenor, french hornist, music educator, choir and opera director.
- María Isabel Chorobik de Mariani, 94, Argentinian human rights activist, co-founder of the Grandmothers of the Plaza de Mayo, stroke.
- Antoinette Martignoni, 99, American artist.
- Jimmy McIlroy, 86, Northern Irish football player (Burnley, national team) and manager (Oldham Athletic).
- Fidelis Mhashu, 76, Zimbabwean politician, Minister of National Housing and Social Amenities (2009–2013), MP for Chitungwiza North.
- Brian Murray, 80, South African Hall of Fame actor (Treasure Planet, Bob Roberts, Dream House) and theatre director.
- Peter Nott, 84, British Anglican prelate, Bishop of Norwich (1985–1999).
- Antonio Pischedda, 75, Italian actor and politician, Senator (1992–1994), complications from a stroke.
- Jennifer Ramírez Rivero, 39, Venezuelan model and businesswoman.
- Piloo Sarkari, 91, Indian Olympic cyclist.
- Alexander Shihwarg, 95, British poet and restaurateur.
- Jacques Tétreault, 89, Canadian politician.
- Eddie Willis, 82, American studio guitarist (The Funk Brothers), complications from poliomyelitis.
- Craig Zadan, 69, American film producer (Chicago, Footloose, Hairspray), complications following shoulder surgery.

=== 21 ===
- George Andrie, 78, American football player (Dallas Cowboys).
- John Christgau, 84, American writer, heart attack.
- Enrico De Angelis, 97, Italian singer (Quartetto Egie, Quartetto Ritmo, Quartetto Cetra).
- Otávio Frias Filho, 61, Brazilian journalist, editorial director of Folha de S.Paulo (since 1984), pancreatic cancer.
- Charles Gain, 94, American police officer, respiratory failure.
- Barbara Harris, 83, American actress (The Apple Tree, Freaky Friday, Nashville), Tony winner (1967), co-founder of The Second City, lung cancer.
- Richards Heuer, 91, American intelligence analyst.
- Spencer P. Jones, 61, New Zealand singer and guitarist (The Johnnys, Beasts of Bourbon, Sacred Cowboys), liver cancer.
- Vesna Krmpotić, 86, Croatian writer and translator.
- Donald Mackay, Baron Mackay of Drumadoon, 72, Scottish lawyer and politician, Lord Advocate (1995–1997).
- Hanna Mina, 94, Syrian novelist.
- Renzo Sclavi, 94, Italian politician, Senator (1983–1987).
- Stefán Karl Stefánsson, 43, Icelandic actor (LazyTown), bile duct cancer.
- Dean Stone, 88, American baseball player (Washington Senators).
- John van Reenen, 71, South African discus thrower, AAA champion (1975), diabetes.
- Vicente Verdú, 75, Spanish writer, journalist and economist.
- Villano III, 66, Mexican professional wrestler (UWA, CMLL, AAA), cerebral infarction.
- Vincino, 72, Italian editorial cartoonist.
- James Whittico Jr., 102, American physician.

=== 22 ===
- Sergio Arredondo, 92, Chilean militant, member of the Caravan of Death, lung cancer.
- Natan Bernot, 87, Slovenian slalom canoeist, world championship silver medalist (1963).
- Chris Champion, 57, American professional wrestler (WCW, CWA, CWF), stroke.
- Roger E. Combs, 73, American Air National Guard major general and judge.
- DuWayne Deitz, 87, American football player and coach (St. Thomas).
- Jeremy Geffen, 45, American entrepreneur, drug overdose.
- H. M. Hoover, 83, American author.
- Tullio Ilomets, 97, Estonian chemist and science historian.
- Richard Kadison, 93, American mathematician.
- Gurudas Kamat, 63, Indian politician, MP (2004–2014), heart attack.
- Ed King, 68, American Hall of Fame guitarist (Strawberry Alarm Clock, Lynyrd Skynyrd) and songwriter ("Sweet Home Alabama"), lung cancer.
- Lazy Lester, 85, American Hall of Fame blues musician, stomach cancer.
- António Marquilhas, 85, Portuguese Olympic fencer.
- Bill McGrath, 81, Australian politician, Victorian MLA (1979–1999).
- Joey Mente, 42, Filipino basketball player (San Miguel Beermen, Welcoat Dragons), cancer.
- Marion Ranyak, 93, American painter.
- Krishna Reddy, 93, Indian artist.
- Norman Rosemont, 93, American television producer.
- Martin Shubik, 92, American economist.
- Jesús Torbado, 75, Spanish writer.

=== 23 ===
- Arcabas, 91, French painter.
- Henry H. Arnhold, 96, American banker.
- Ted Bennett, 93, English footballer (Queens Park Rangers, Watford, Great Britain Olympic team).
- Yves-Marie-Henri Bescond, 94, French Roman Catholic prelate, Auxiliary Bishop of Corbeil (1971–1979) and Meaux (1979–1986).
- Jim Condon, 60, American politician, Member of the Vermont House of Representatives (since 2004), esophageal cancer.
- Brian Drebber, 68, American sportscaster (Speed), traffic collision.
- Andriy Fedetskyi, 60, Ukrainian football player (Volyn Lutsk, Metalist Kharkiv, Gwardia Chelm) and manager.
- Delio Gamboa, 82, Colombian footballer (Millonarios, Once Caldas, national team).
- Cindy Haug, 61, Norwegian writer.
- Russ Heath, 91, American comic book artist (Men of War, Little Annie Fanny, G.I. Combat), cancer.
- Dieter Thomas Heck, 80, German television host (ZDF-Hitparade, Die Pyramide) and actor (Das Millionenspiel).
- Oliver Hoare, 73, English art dealer, cancer.
- Ron Hunt, 72, English footballer (Queens Park Rangers).
- Wendy Hutton, 77, New Zealand travel and food writer.
- Ann Ireland, 65, Canadian novelist, carcinoid syndrome.
- Dominik Kalata, 93, Slovak Roman Catholic prelate, Titular Bishop of Semta (since 1985).
- Eli Kassner, 94, Canadian guitar teacher and musician.
- Gordon Kew, 88, English football referee.
- Yasser Al-Masri, 47, Jordanian actor (Dawa'er Hob: Circles of Love, Al-Gama'a), traffic collision.
- Kuldip Nayar, 95, Indian journalist (The Statesman), human rights activist and politician, MP (1997–2003).
- Mick O'Toole, 86, Irish racehorse trainer (Dickens Hill).
- Dario Pegoretti, 62, Italian bicycle framebuilder, heart attack.
- Del Riley, 93, American county clerk.
- George Sheldon, 71, American politician, member of the Florida House of Representatives (1974–1982), complications from a fall.
- Lance Thompson, 40, Australian rugby league player (St George Dragons, Cronulla Sharks).
- Franck Venaille, 81, French poet and writer.
- George Walker, 96, American composer (Lilacs), Pulitzer Prize recipient (1996), fall.
- David Yallop, 81, British author, complications from Alzheimer's disease.

=== 24 ===
- Stan Black, 62, American football player (San Francisco 49ers), traffic collision.
- Andre Blay, 81, American film producer (Prince of Darkness, They Live, Village of the Damned).
- Vijay Chavan, 63, Indian actor (Mumbaicha Dabewala), lung disease.
- Lawrence J. DeNardis, 80, American politician, member of the U.S. House of Representatives (1981–1983), President of the University of New Haven (1991–2004).
- Claudiomiro Estrais Ferreira, 68, Brazilian footballer (Internacional, Botafogo, national team).
- Sherkhan Farnood, 57, Afghan banker (Kabul Bank) and poker player, heart attack.
- Tom Frost, 81, American mountaineer and photographer, cancer.
- Uri Katzenstein, 67, Israeli sculptor and musician, stroke.
- Robin Leach, 76, British writer and television host (Lifestyles of the Rich and Famous), complications from a stroke.
- Jeff Lowe, 67, American mountaineer, amyotrophic lateral sclerosis.
- Princeton Lyman, 82, American diplomat, Ambassador to Nigeria (1986–1989) and South Africa (1992–1995), lung cancer.
- James Mallinson, 74–75, English record producer.
- Gordon McOmber, 98, American politician, Lieutenant Governor of Montana (1988–1989).
- Stanley Morgan, 88, English novelist and actor (The Return of Mr. Moto).
- Emiddio Novi, 72, Italian journalist and politician, MP (1994–2008), traffic collision.
- Javier Otxoa, 43, Spanish cyclist, Paralympic champion (2004, 2008).
- Aleksei Paramonov, 93, Soviet-born Russian football player (Spartak Moscow, national team) and manager (Étoile Sahel), Olympic champion (1956).
- Antonio Pennarella, 58, Italian actor (The Butterfly's Dream, On My Skin, We Believed).
- Valentina Rastvorova, 85, Soviet-born Russian fencer, Olympic champion (1960) and silver medalist (1960, 1964), eight-time world champion.
- Gordon Riddick, 74, English footballer (Luton Town, Gillingham, Brentford).
- Monique Rossi, 80, French Olympic gymnast.
- Trudy Stevenson, 73, Zimbabwean politician and diplomat, Ambassador to Senegal (since 2009).
- Ivan Štraus, 90, Bosnian architect (Belgrade Museum of Aviation).
- Sir Adrian Swire, 86, British businessman (Swire).
- Ciril Zlobec, 93, Slovene poet, writer and politician.

=== 25 ===
- Miyoko Asō, 92, Japanese actress and voice actress (Fullmetal Alchemist, Ranma ½, Sazae-san), senile dementia.
- Al Barks, 82, American baseball player (New York Black Yankees).
- Florian Beigel, 76, German architect, cardiac arrest.
- Rolf Yngvar Berg, 92, Norwegian botanist.
- Dieudonné Bogmis, 63, Cameroonian Roman Catholic prelate, Bishop of Éséka (since 2004), stroke.
- Art Bragg, 87, American Olympic sprinter (1952).
- Harry M. Clor, 91, American political philosopher.
- Con Cooney, 84, Irish hurler and coach.
- Ruth Finley, 98, American publisher (The Fashion Calendar), respiratory failure.
- S. H. Hasbullah, 67, Sri Lankan geographer and academic, heart attack.
- Lindsay Kemp, 80, English dancer, choreographer (Ziggy Stardust) and actor (The Wicker Man, Valentino).
- Karl F. Lopker, 66, American business executive (QAD, Deckers), prostate cancer.
- John McCain, 81, American politician and Navy officer, member of the U.S. Senate (since 1987) and House of Representatives (1983–1987), glioblastoma.
- Hari Chand Middha, 76, Indian politician, heart attack.
- David Parrott, 85, English cricketer.
- Meyer Rosen, 98, American politician, Member of the South Carolina House of Representatives (1963–1966).
- Tadeusz Rudolf, 92, Polish economist and politician, Minister of Labor and Social Policy (1974–1979).
- Noam Sheriff, 83, Israeli composer and conductor, heart attack.
- Eugenio Tarabini, 88, Italian politician, MP (1968–1994), heart attack.
- Victorino Tejera, 95, Venezuelan-born American academic.
- Vojtěch Varadín, 69, Slovak footballer (Spartak Trnava, Slovan Bratislava, Czechoslovakia national team).
- Germán Villegas, 74, Colombian lawyer and politician, Mayor of Cali (1990–1992), Governor of Valle del Cauca (1995–1997, 2001–2003) and Senator (2006–2014), stroke.

=== 26 ===
- Alyosha Abrahamyan, 72, Armenian footballer (Ararat Yerevan).
- Federico Barbosa Gutiérrez, 66, Mexican jurist and politician, member of the Congress of the Union (2003–2006), heart attack.
- Martin van Beek, 58, Dutch politician, Senator (2012–2015, 2017, since 2018).
- Inge Borkh, 97, German soprano.
- Gopal Bose, 71, Indian cricketer (Bengal, national team), heart attack.
- Rosa Bouglione, 107, French circus performer.
- Carlo Della Corna, 66, Italian football player (Varese, Udinese) and manager (Voghera), cancer.
- Barrie Dunsmore, 79, American journalist (ABC News).
- George J. Eade, 96, American Air Force general.
- Odysseus Eskitzoglou, 86, Greek sailor, Olympic champion (1960).
- K. K. Haridas, 52, Indian film director, heart attack.
- Kerry Hill, 75, Australian architect.
- Tony Hiller, 91, British songwriter ("United We Stand", "Save Your Kisses for Me", "Figaro") and producer.
- Brahim Karabi, 84, Tunisian Olympic sprinter (1960).
- Juhani Keto, 70, Finnish basketball player.
- Cristina Marsans, 72, Spanish golfer.
- Juraj Miklušica, 80, Slovak Olympic cyclist.
- Thomas J. O'Brien, 82, American Roman Catholic prelate, Bishop of Phoenix (1982–2003), complications from Parkinson's disease.
- Patrick Quilty, 79, Australian palaeontologist.
- Hamsad Rangkuti, 75, Indonesian writer, complications from a stroke.
- Neil Simon, 91, American playwright (Biloxi Blues, The Odd Couple) and screenwriter (The Goodbye Girl), Tony winner (1965, 1985, 1991), complications from pneumonia.

=== 27 ===
- Alan Cairns, 88, Canadian political scientist.
- Robert Churchhouse, 90, British mathematician.
- Dale M. Cochran, 89, American politician, Secretary of Agriculture of Iowa (1987–1999), member of the Iowa House of Representatives (1965–1987).
- Rohan Daluwatte, 77, Sri Lankan Army general, heart attack.
- Max Geuter, 80, German Olympic fencer (1964, 1968, 1972).
- Grant Greenham, 64, Australian Olympic archer.
- Aya Koyama, 45, Japanese professional wrestler (BJW, AJW) and mixed martial artist (Smackgirl), cancer.
- Henry McNamara, 83, American politician, member of the New Jersey Senate (1985–2008).
- S. Nagoor Meeran, 55, Indian politician, renal failure.
- Olga Meyer, 88, Norwegian journalist.
- Mirka Mora, 90, French-born Australian artist and cultural figure, complications from Alzheimer's disease.
- Iolanda Nanni, 49, Italian politician, Deputy (since 2018), cancer.
- Ron Newman, 82, British-born American soccer player (Atlanta Chiefs, Fort Lauderdale Strikers) and manager (San Diego Sockers).
- Alfonso Osorio, 94, Spanish military lawyer and politician, Minister of Presidency (1975–1977) and Second Vice President (1975–1977).
- Emil Rachev, 28, Bulgarian footballer (Burgas, Neftochimic Burgas, Rozova Dolina), heart attack.
- Robert H. Solo, 85, American film producer (Invasion of the Body Snatchers, Scrooge, Bad Boys).
- Bobby Walden, 80, American football player (Minnesota Vikings, Pittsburgh Steelers).
- Fredd Wayne, 93, American actor (The Spiral Road, Hangup, Bewitched).
- Rupert Webb, 96, English cricketer (Sussex).
- Stellan Westerdahl, 81, Swedish sailor, Olympic silver medalist (1972).
- Murray Westgate, 100, Canadian actor (Happy Birthday to Me, Blue City Slammers, Scanners II: The New Order).

=== 28 ===
- Eiko Ando, 84, Japanese-American actress (The Barbarian and the Geisha).
- Ray Barry, 89, American-born Canadian ice hockey player (Boston Bruins).
- Abraham Eisenstark, 98, Polish-born American microbiologist.
- Josep Fontana, 86, Spanish historian and academic (Pompeu Fabra University).
- C. David Gutsche, 97, American chemist.
- Andrew Hughes, 62, Australian police officer, Fijian Commissioner of Police (2003–2006), bowel cancer.
- Maqbool Hussain, Pakistani war prisoner.
- Adrienne Lash Jones, 83, American academic.
- Tatyana Kuznetsova, 77, Soviet-born Russian cosmonaut.
- Nestorius Timanywa, 81, Tanzanian Roman Catholic prelate, Bishop of Bukoba (1973–2013).
- Szczepan Wesoły, 91, Polish Roman Catholic prelate, Auxiliary Bishop of Gniezno (1968–2003).

=== 29 ===
- Robin Birley, 83, British archaeologist (Vindolanda).
- Jim Breithaupt, 83, Canadian politician.
- Stan Brock, 82, British philanthropist, founder of Remote Area Medical.
- Tony Camillo, 90, American record producer (Bazuka) and arranger.
- Silvano Campeggi, 95, Italian film poster designer (Casablanca, Singin' in the Rain, Breakfast at Tiffany's).
- Samuel Conti, 96, American judge (U.S. District Court for the Northern District of California).
- Charley Ellis, 74, American Olympic boxer (1964).
- Gary Friedrich, 75, American comic book writer (Sgt. Fury and his Howling Commandos, Captain Marvel), co-creator of Ghost Rider, complications from Parkinson's disease.
- Ken Ford, 88, British sculptor.
- Joseph P. Graw, 103, American politician, member of the Minnesota House of Representatives (1963–1974).
- Nandamuri Harikrishna, 61, Indian actor and politician, traffic collision.
- Elizabeth Kishkon, 87, Canadian politician, Mayor of Windsor, Ontario (1983–1985).
- François Konter, 84, Luxembourgish footballer (Anderlecht, Gent, national team).
- Erich Lessing, 95, Austrian photographer.
- Ellie Mannette, 90, Trinidadian steelpan musician.
- Sir James Mirrlees, 82, Scottish economist, Nobel Prize laureate (1996).
- Peter Mond, 4th Baron Melchett, 70, British environmentalist and politician.
- Tom Murphy, 81, Canadian politician, member of the Newfoundland and Labrador House of Assembly (1989–1996).
- Carilda Oliver Labra, 96, Cuban poet.
- Mihály Petrovszky, 67, Hungarian Olympic judoka.
- Marie Severin, 89, American Hall of Fame comic book artist (Thor, Iron Man), co-creator of Spider-Woman, stroke.
- Liston Sprauve, 74, United States Virgin Islands Olympic weightlifter.
- Paul Spudis, 66, American geologist and planetary scientist, lung cancer.
- David Sugarbaker, 65, American physician.
- Paul Taylor, 88, American choreographer (Paul Taylor Dance Company), renal failure.
- Kolya Vasin, 73, Russian author and collector of Beatles memorabilia, fall.
- Thomas Wiseman, 87, British author, playwright and screenwriter.
- Sir Barry Wilson, 82, British admiral.

=== 30 ===
- Peter Corris, 76, Australian author (Deep Water, That Empty Feeling, The Empty Beach) and historian.
- Peter Frame, 61, American ballet dancer (New York City Ballet), suicide by jumping.
- Jack Garrick, 90, New Zealand ichthyologist.
- Ed Husmann, 87, American football player (Chicago Cardinals, Houston Oilers, Dallas Cowboys).
- B. Jaya, 54, Indian film director (Gundamma Gaari Manavadu, Lovely) and actress, heart attack.
- Joseph Kobzon, 80, Russian singer, People's Artist of USSR (1987), prostate cancer.
- Ray Kubala, 75, American football player (Denver Broncos), amyotrophic lateral sclerosis.
- Zohar Manna, 79, Israeli computer scientist.
- Vanessa Marquez, 49, American actress (ER, Stand and Deliver, Wiseguy), shot.
- Medicean, 21, British racehorse (Eclipse Stakes).
- William Joseph Nealon Jr., 95, American judge (U.S. District Court for the Middle District of Pennsylvania).
- Ray, 36, Hong Kong professional wrestler (WNC, JWP, Ice Ribbon), brain cancer.
- Richard W. Waggener, 88, American politician.
- David Watkin, 77, English architectural historian.

=== 31 ===
- Susan Brown, 86, American actress (General Hospital, Santa Barbara, As the World Turns), complications from Alzheimer's disease.
- Luigi Luca Cavalli-Sforza, 96, Italian population geneticist.
- John M. Darley, 80, American social psychologist.
- Brian Davis, 84, Australian politician, member of the Queensland Legislative Assembly (1969–1974, 1977–1989).
- José Luis Dibildox Martínez, 75, Mexican Roman Catholic prelate, Bishop of Tarahumara (1993–2003) and Tampico (since 2003); chronic illness.
- Marianne Eckardt, 105, German-born American psychoanalyst, translator and editor.
- Mario Facco, 72, Italian football player (Lazio, Avellino) and manager (Frosinone).
- Peter Hatendi, 91, Zimbabwean Anglican prelate, Bishop of Harare and Mashonaland (1979–1995), heart and lung disease.
- Gloria Jean, 92, American singer and actress (The Under-Pup, Pardon My Rhythm, Manhattan Angel), heart failure.
- Ian Jones, 86, Australian author and television producer.
- Hans Joachim Keil III, 74, Samoan politician, cancer.
- Wolfgang Klausewitz, 96, German ichthyologist and marine biologist.
- Amanda Kyle Williams, 61, American crime novelist, cancer.
- Anita Lindman, 86, Swedish television announcer and producer (Anita och Televinken).
- Elmar Pieroth, 83, German politician, member of the Bundestag (1969–1981).
- Carole Shelley, 79, British actress (Wicked, The Elephant Man, Robin Hood), Tony winner (1979), cancer.
- Philip Short, 58, Irish chess player.
- Phil Slosburg, 91, American football player (Boston Yanks, New York Bulldogs).
- Alice Yotopoulos-Marangopoulos, 101, Greek criminologist and women's rights activist, President of the International Alliance of Women (1989–1996).
- Alexander Zakharchenko, 42, Ukrainian separatist leader, President and Prime Minister of the Donetsk People's Republic (since 2014), bombing.
