= Bescond =

Bescond is a French surname. Notable people with the surname include:

- Anaïs Bescond (born 1987), French biathlete
- Jean-Baptiste Le Bescond (born 1980), French football player
- Yves-Marie-Henri Bescond (1924–2018), French Prelate of Roman Catholic Church
