= Wagoner (surname) =

Wagoner, Waggoner and Waggonner are surnames. Notable people with one of these surnames include:

- Adeline Palmier Wagoner (1868–1929), American volunteer organizational leader and author
- Amy Wagoner Johnson, American materials scientist and bioengineer
- Andrew Waggoner (born 1960), American composer and violinist
- Betty Wagoner (1930–2006), baseball player
- Brady Wagoner (born 1980), American-Danish psychologist
- Brooke Waggoner (born 1984), American singer-songwriter
- Dan Wagoner (born 1959), American football player
- Daniel Waggoner (1828–1902), early American settler and rancher
- Darrel Waggoner, American clinical geneticist
- David Wagoner (1926–2021), American poet
- E. Paul Waggoner (1889–1967), American rancher and horsebreeder
- Electra Waggoner (1882–1925), American rancher and socialite
- Electra Waggoner Biggs (1912–2001), American sculptor, daughter of E. Paul and Electra
- Ellet J. Waggoner (1855–1916), American theologian
- Eric Wagoner, American college football coach
- Esther Van Wagoner Tufty (1896–1986), American journalist
- Fred Waggoner (1895–1986), American politician from Nebraska
- George Wagoner (disambiguation), multiple people
- Guy Waggoner (1883–1950), American rancher and businessman
- Hal Waggoner (1930–2004), American football player
- Harold E. Wagoner (1905–1986), American ecclesiastical architect
- Henry O. Wagoner (1816–1901), American abolitionist and civil rights activist
- Hyatt Howe Waggoner (1913–1988), American literary scholar
- J. T. Waggoner (born 1937), American politician
- Jaiden Waggoner (born 1997), American soccer player
- James E. Waggoner Jr. (1948 or 1949–2026), American clergyman
- Jarom Wagoner, American city planner and politician
- Jeff Waggoner, American college baseball coach
- Joe Waggonner (1918–2007), American politician
- John Wagoner (1923–2017), American football player
- Keith Wagoner, American politician
- Kenneth S. Wagoner (1911–2000), American physiological skin scientist
- Kirk Wagoner, American politician
- Kristen Waggoner, American attorney
- Linda Waggoner, American historian
- Lyle Waggoner (1935–2020), American actor
- Mark Wagoner (born 1971), American politician
- Marsha Waggoner (born 1940), American poker player
- Merle E. Wagoner (1894–1971), American football, basketball, baseball, track, tennis coach and college athletics administrator
- Murray Van Wagoner (1898–1986), American politician from Michigan
- Paul Waggoner (born 1979), American musician
- Paul Waggoner (politician), American politician and businessman
- Philip Dakin Wagoner (1876–1962), American businessman
- Porter Wagoner (1927–2007), American country music singer
- Presley Merritt Wagoner, American clubwoman
- Richard S. Van Wagoner (1946–2010), American historian, audiologist and author
- Rick Wagoner (born 1953), American businessman
- Sophronia Wilson Wagoner (1834-1929), pioneer missionary
- Stanley Wagoner (1891–1949), American pole vaulter
- Thomas Wagoner (born 1942), American politician and businessman
- Tim Waggoner (born 1964), American author
- Todd Waggoner (born 1965), American pair skater
- William Thomas Waggoner (1852–1934), American rancher, oilman, banker, horse breeder and philanthropist
- William Van Wagoner (1870–after 1920), American bicycle racer, designer of the Van Wagoner
- Willie Waggonner (1905–1976), American sheriff from Louisiana
- Winfred E. Wagoner (1888–1948), American educator

== See also ==
- Waggener (surname)
