= Faucher =

Faucher may refer to:

== People with the surname ==
- Calvin Faucher (born 1995), American baseball pitcher
- Françoise Faucher (born 1929), Canadian actress
- Léon Faucher (1803–1854), French politician and economist
- Julius Faucher (1820–1878), German journalist
- Narcisse Henri Édouard Faucher (1844–1897), Canadian writer, journalist, army officer and politician who published books under the name Faucher de Saint-Maurice
- Louis-Eugène Faucher (1874–1964), French general
- William H. Faucher (1938–2018), American politician

== Places ==
- Faucher River, a tributary of Tessier Lake in La Tuque, Mauricie, Quebec, Canada
- La Chapelle-Faucher, a commune in the Dordogne department in Aquitaine in southwestern France
