= Waggener =

Waggener is a family name. Notable people with the name include:

- John Waggener (1925–2017), U.S. Army officer
- Leslie Waggener (1841–1896), American professor and administrator
- Oliver G. Waggener, 13th Secretary of State of Kentucky
- Richard W. Waggener (1930–2018), member of the Wyoming House of Representatives

== See also ==
- Waggoner (disambiguation)
- Wagener (surname)
