= Gutsche =

Gutsche is a German surname. Notable people with this surname include:

- C. David Gutsche (1921–2018), American chemist
- Clara Gutsche (born 1949), American-born Canadian photographer
- Gail Gutsche, American activist and politician
- Thelma Gutsche (1915–1984), South African filmmaker
- Torsten Gutsche (born 1968), East German-German sprint canoer
