= Berck (surname) =

Berck is a surname. Notable people with the surname include:

- Omer Berck (1895–1926), Belgian fencer
- Peter Berck (1950–2018), American economist

== See also ==
- Berk (name)
