= Vetrano =

Vetrano is a southern Italian surname from western Sicily, Campania and Apulia, either derived from the town of Castelvetrano, Sicily, or from nicknames related to Latin vetus 'old' (cf. English veteran). Notable people with the surname include:

- Candela Vetrano (born 1991), Argentine actress
- Giulia Vetrano (born 2005), Italian swimmer
- Joe Vetrano (1918–1995), American football player
- Karina Vetrano (1986–2016), American speech-language pathologist and murder victim
- Stefano Vetrano (1923–2018), Italian politician

== See also ==
- Vitrano
