= Adrienne Jones =

Adrienne Jones may refer to:

- Adrienne A. Jones, American politician from Maryland
- Adrienne Lash Jones, American academic of Black studies
