= Van Wagoner (automobile) =

Defunct American motor vehicle manufacturer

- Type: Automobile Manufacturing
- Industry: Automotive
- Genre: Electric and gasoline run-about called the Van Wagoner and later renamed to Syracuse
- Founded: 1899
- Defunct: 1903
- Fate: Manufactured by Syracuse Automobile Company that discontinued production in 1903. Later models produced by Century Motor Vehicle Company
- Headquarters: Syracuse, New York, United States
- Area served: United States
- Key people: William H. Van Wagoner, automobile designer
- Products: Automobiles

The Van Wagoner was an American electric automobile manufactured between 1899 and 1903 in Syracuse, New York, by the Syracuse Automobile Company. It was advertised as "built on a simple plan that does away with several levers and push buttons" and could purportedly be "controlled with one hand."

During 1900 the model was renamed to the Syracuse and was produced under that name until 1903. There were a number of reported problems with the car in 1901 because the rear brake compressor periodically gave out.
