= Vitrano =

Vitrano is a southern Italian surname from Palermo, Sicily, derived from the town of Castelvetrano. Notable people with the surname include:

- Annandrea Vitrano (born 1988), Italian actress, comedian and singer
- Carlo Vitrano (1938–2020), Italian wrestler

== See also ==
- Vetrano
