= Hits (film) =

- Theatrical release poster
- Directed by: David Cross
- Written by: David Cross
- Produced by: Giles Andrew; Ryan A. Brooks; Charles Denton; Jessica Latham
- Starring: Matt Walsh; James Adomian; Meredith Hagner; Jason Ritter; Jake Cherry; Derek Waters; Wyatt Cenac; Michael Cera
- Cinematography: Paul Koestner
- Edited by: Patrick Colman
- Production company: Honora Productions
- Distributed by: Honora Productions
- Release dates: January 21, 2014 (Sundance Film Festival); February 13, 2015 (United States)
- Running time: 100 minutes
- Country: United States
- Language: English
- Budget: $1 million

Hits is a 2014 American comedy-drama written and directed by David Cross. The film is the directorial debut of Cross. The film had its world premiere at 2014 Sundance Film Festival on January 21, 2014. The film later screened at 2014 Sundance London Film Festival on April 26, 2014. On February 13, 2015, Hits became the first feature-length film to be released on BitTorrent with a pay-what-you-want model. The Recording Academy's Chapter President Tammy Susan Hurt contributed music to the film via Georgia Music Partners.

== Plot ==
Municipal worker Dave's life changes completely when videos of his rants about potholes at City Hall go viral on YouTube.

== Cast ==
- James Adomian as Donovan
- Amy Carlson as Christina Casserta
- Wyatt Cenac as Babatunde
- Michael Cera as Bennie
- Jake Cherry as Cory
- Meredith Hagner as Katelyn
- Amy Sedaris as Crystal
- Erinn Hayes as Maddy
- Mela Hudson as Juli's Friend
- David Koechner as Rich
- Jason Ritter as Julian
- Russ Tamblyn as Russ
- Matt Walsh as Dave
- Derek Waters as Larson

== Reception ==
Hits received mixed reviews from critics. On review aggregator website Rotten Tomatoes, the film holds an approval rating of 35% based on 23 reviews, and an average rating of 5.35/10. The site's critics consensus reads: "Hits undermines its undeniably timely message with a darkly bitter tone that makes the movie's caustic humor harder to swallow." On Metacritic, the film has a weighted average score of 45 out of 100, based on 9 critics, indicating "mixed or average" reviews.

Alee Karim of Under the Radar called it "a terrific film whose (apparently) controversial conclusion is earned." Justin Chang of Variety, said in his review that "David Cross’s scattershot “Hits” resembles early Alexander Payne in its playful (or hateful?) skewering of local yokels and their purportedly dim dreams." David Rooney in his review for The Hollywood Reporter said that "Celebrity in the age of the viral sensation gets broad treatment in this modest effort, unlikely to reflect its title," while Katherine Kilkenny of IndieWire opined that "the film’s holier-than-thou approach produces laughs in the initial scenes but edges closer to bland misanthropy once Liberty’s developed characters get their unjust deserts."
