= Genie Shenk =

American book and fiber artist (1937–2018)

- Born: August 3, 1937; Montgomery, Alabama
- Died: August 19, 2018 (aged 81); Seattle, Washington
- Known for: Book arts, fiber art

Genie Shenk (1937–2018) was an American artist, editor, and educator known for her work in artist books and fiber arts.

== Early life and education ==
Genie Shenk was born on August 3, 1937, in Montgomery, Alabama.

She earned a BA in 1959, MA in 1961, and PhD in 1963 in English from Rice University in Houston, Texas, a Master of Fine Arts at UCLA in 1990.

== Career ==
Shenk worked in fiber arts, creating quilts of handmade paper she pressed from natural and recycled materials. Her work focused on book art and has strong references to Jungian philosophy, where she recorded her dreams in visual form.

Shenk's work has been widely exhibited including the University of Washington Library Special Collections, the University of California San Diego Special Collections, the Athenaeum Music and Arts Library in La Jolla, the Long Beach Museum of Art, Her work is in the collection of the National Museum of Women in the Arts (NMWA), and the Yale University Art Gallery.

Shenk was the Assistant English Professor at Texas Southern University, Houston, from 1963 to 1964, and editor at both the University of California-San Francisco Medical Center, from 1964 to 1965, and the American Book Company, New York City, from 1965 to 1967. She worked as student activities coordinator for the University of California, San Diego, from 1970 to 1974.

== Awards ==
Shenk received the following acknowledgements; Women's Festival of the Arts, 1978; third award winner, Multicultural Art Institute, 1982; Woodrow Wilson fellowship, 1959. Member of Phi Beta Kappa, National Surface Design Association, San Diego Artists Guild, American Crafts Council, Allied Craftsmen, Artists Equity, California Fibers.

The San Diego Book Arts (SDBA) grants "The Genie Shenk Excellence in Book Arts Award" once a year to recognize an outstanding mid-career artist.

== Death ==
Shenk died on August 19, 2018, in Seattle, Washington at the age of 81.
