= I Just Want My Pants Back =

- Genre: Comedy
- Based on: I Just Want My Pants Back by David J. Rosen
- Developed by: David J. Rosen
- Starring: Peter Vack; Elisabeth Hower; Jordan Carlos; Kim Shaw; Sunkrish Bala
- Music by: Josh Myers
- Country of origin: United States
- Original language: English
- No. of seasons: 1
- No. of episodes: 12

Production
- Executive producers: Dave Bartis; David J. Rosen; Doug Liman
- Production locations: Brooklyn, New York
- Camera setup: Single-camera
- Running time: 22 minutes
- Production companies: Universal Cable Productions; Hypnotic; Open 4 Business Productions

Original release
- Network: MTV
- Release: August 28, 2011 – April 5, 2012

I Just Want My Pants Back is an American comedy-drama that premiered with a special sneak peek on August 28, 2011 on MTV, with the series airing the new episodes beginning on February 2, 2012. The series is based on David J. Rosen's 2007 novel of the same name.

On May 16, 2012, MTV canceled the series.

== Synopsis ==
The series follows the life of a group of twenty-somethings as they try to get through life as best they can in Brooklyn.

== Cast ==
- Peter Vack as Jason Strider, a young Jewish twenty-something trying to juggle sex, love, career and friendship out of college.
- Kim Shaw as Tina, Jason's best friend
- Elisabeth Hower as Stacey, Eric's college sweetheart. She's studying to be a lawyer
- Jordan Carlos as Eric, Stacey's college sweetheart. He's studying to be a medical doctor
- Sunkrish Bala as Bobby, the owner of the local bodega.

=== Recurring cast ===
- Chris Parnell as J.B. Jason's no-nonsense boss at the casting agency
- Nick Kocher as Lench
- Kelli Barrett as Jane
- Steve Talley as Brett
- Stephanie Brait as Ness

=== Guest stars ===
- Mela Hudson, Bartender
- Ashley Austin Morris, Jocoby
- Billy Keenly, Chunky
- Reza Garakani, Brian
- Zack Robidas, Meyers

== Production ==
The series is based on David J. Rosen's 2007 novel I Just Want My Pants Back. The pilot was written by David J. Rosen and directed by Doug Liman. The series is executive produced by Rosen, Liman and Dave Bartis with Universal Cable Productions and Hypnotic. It is also co-executive produced by Gene Klein.

Peter Vack, Elisabeth Hower, Jordan Carlos, Kim Shaw were cast as the four leads, Jason, Stacey, Eric and Tina. Production on the half-hour pilot began in New York City on September 3, 2010.

On January 14, 2011, MTV ordered the pilot to series of 12 episodes, with production started on the rest of the season in June 2011. A sneak peek of the pilot episode aired on August 28, 2011, following the 2011 MTV Video Music Awards and averaged 5.1 million viewers and a 4.9 P12-34 rating. The series began the rest of season one on February 2, 2012, following Jersey Shore. The re-airing of the pilot on February 2, 2012, pulled in 1.81 million viewers and a 1.0 rating.

== Episodes ==
No.	Title	Directed by	Written by	Original release date	U.S. viewers (millions)
1	"Pilot"	Doug Liman	Teleplay by : David J. Rosen	August 28, 2011	5.1
After a one night stand leaves him with a pair of his jeans stolen, Jason Strider begins his quest through New York City, to get his beloved jeans back, and hopefully the girl, whilst also dealing with his entry-level job at a casting agency, and his friends, Tina, Eric and Stacey.
2	"Baby Monkeys"	Jace Alexander	David J. Rosen	February 2, 2012	1.22
Jason posts an ad looking for Jane on missed connections, Tina, while anxiously awaiting a text from Brett, de-virginizes an intern, and Stacey and Eric have new mattress sex on a mattress that turns out to be anything but new.
3	"Never Trust a Moonblower"	Jace Alexander	Isaac Aptaker & Elizabeth Berger	February 9, 2012	1.88
Jason quits his job for a new job he's promised only to find out it's only an internship. Stacey and Eric kinda have a foursome. At another promising job interview Jason sees Jane and consequently blows the interview.
4	"Pecker Necklace"	Jace Alexander	Jessi Klein	February 16, 2012	2.04
Tina and Stacey are forced to join a bachelorette party, Jason ends up backrubbing his weed dealer and transporting a giant piñata penis through town. Eric has a less than enthusiastic first night at the hospital.
5	"Something's Wrong Down There"	Jace Alexander	David J. Rosen	February 23, 2012	1.76
Eric diagnoses Tina with Chlamydia, Jason is confused whether he's being paid for cleaning or sex. He solves the problem by being fired.
6	"Safety Nets"	Rosemary Rodriguez	Adam Stein & David J. Rosen	February 23, 2012	1.31
Tina gets evicted because she didn't pay rent for 4 months, spending the money on bags instead. Her plan to use Stacey as leverage falls short too. Jason meets a lovely french girl who teaches him about how the universe provides.
7	"Piece of Cake"	Rosemary Rodriguez	Isaac Aptaker & Elizabeth Berger	March 1, 2012	1.64
Tina learns that people one breaks up with (Brett) tend to see other people and gets drunk with Bobby. Jason - dressed as cake - finally meets Jane on the street and shares a suspicious joint with a co-worker. Events spiral downwards from there. Both show up to Stacie and Eric's party wasted and broken.
8	"The Blackout"	Doug Liman	Jessi Klein	March 8, 2012	1.70
The gang's invited by Ness to a party way out in Bushwick. On the way, a short citywide blackout brings hidden tensions to the surface: Stacey possibly is pregnant and Tina asks Jason not to flirt with Ness as he "keeps peeing in her pool", chasing away possible friends.
9	"Love Equation"	Rosemary Rodriguez	Story by : Isaac Aptaker & Elizabeth Berger; Teleplay by : Adam Stein	March 15, 2012	1.45
Tina tries to "Yoko" her new man out of a cover band, and Jason puts his relationship with Ness in jeopardy after some poor birthday gift-giving.
10	"Sextipated"	Jace Alexander	Jessi Klein	March 22, 2012	1.09
Jason meets Ness' ex, Tina is assigned to work with an LA photographer, and Eric and Stacey lock themselves down in a 72-hour study session.
11	"Quid No Quo"	Jace Alexander	Isaac Aptaker & Elizabeth Berger	March 29, 2012	0.93
Jason tries to impress his high-school crush; Tina goes on a romantic date with Paul; a tough semester has Eric questioning his future.
12	"Jerk or Dork"	Jace Alexander	David J. Rosen	April 5, 2012	N/A
Tina and Jason's big night out doesn't go as planned. Jason has a run-in with Jane and tries to find out what happened between them, while Tina worries that things are moving too quickly with Paul.
