= Century Motor Vehicle Company =

Defunct American motor vehicle manufacturer

- Company type: Automobile Manufacturing
- Industry: Automotive
- Genre: Runabouts, roadsters
- Founded: 1899
- Founder: Charles F. Saul, William Van Wagoner, Charles Listman, Charles A. Bridgman and Hiram W. Plumb
- Defunct: 1903
- Fate: Failed - underestimated their production costs
- Headquarters: Syracuse, New York, United States
- Area served: United States
- Products: Vehicles; Automotive parts

Century Motor Vehicle Company (1899–1903) was a manufacturer of electric and steam automobiles in Syracuse, New York. The company switched to gasoline-fuelled internal combustion engine-powered automobiles in January 1903, and went out of business later that year.

It is not to be confused with Century, a British motor company that produced cars until 1907.

== Advertisements ==
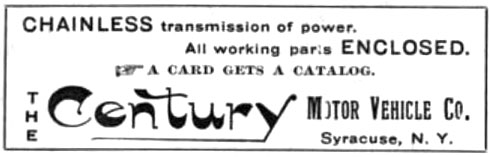
Century Motor Vehicle Company - Chainless transmission of power - The Horseless Age, 1901

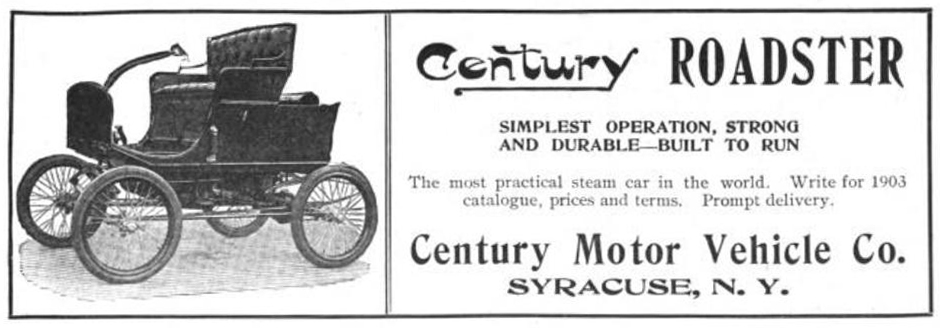
Century Roadster - 1903

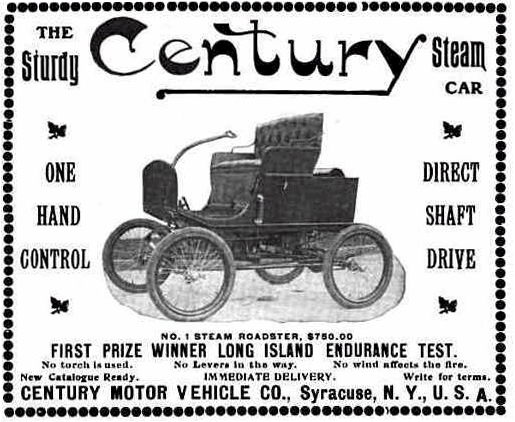
Century Motor Vehicle Company - 1903

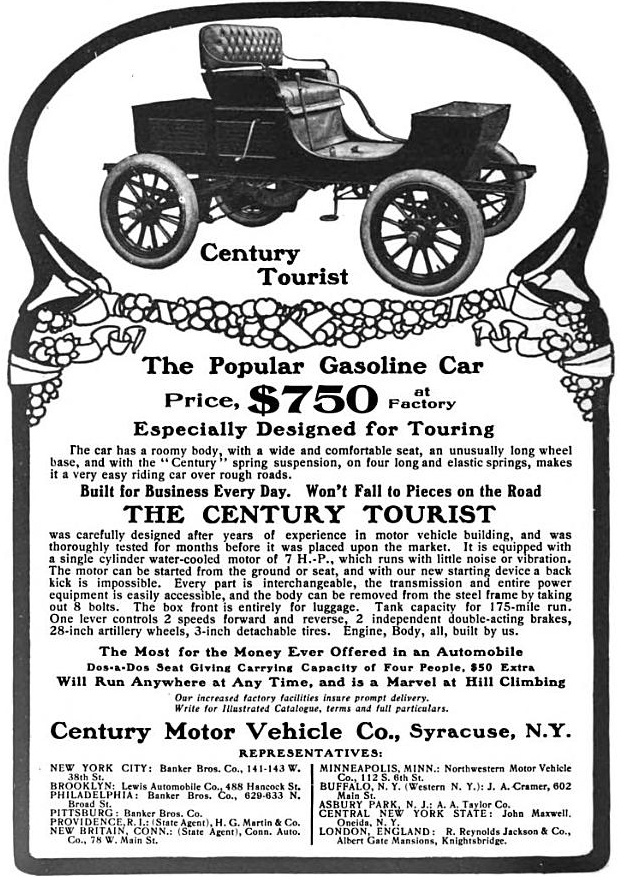
Century Tourist - 1903

For Sale - Century Steam automobile - Altoona Mirror, December 10, 1906
