= Waggoner =

Waggoner may refer to:

== People ==
- Wagoner (surname), a list of people named Wagoner, Waggoner or Waggonner
- Waggoner Carr (1918–2004), American politician

== Places in the United States ==
- Waggoner, Illinois, a village
- Waggoner Ranch, a large historic ranch in northwest Texas
- Waggoner Ranch Formation, a geologic formation in Texas
- Waggoner Airport, a private airport on the Bell Ranch, Tucumcari, New Mexico

== Buildings in the United States ==
- Daniel Waggoner Log House and Barn, a historic home in Centre County, Pennsylvania
- Waggoner Mansion in Decatur, Texas
- W. T. Waggoner Building, a skyscraper in Fort Worth, Texas

== Companies ==
- Waggoner National Bank of Vernon, a bank in Texas

== See also ==
- Wagner (disambiguation)
