= Iolanda Nanni =

Italian politician (1968–2018)

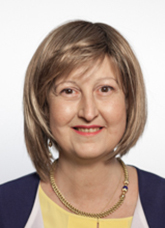

Member of the Chamber of Deputies
- In office 23 March 2018 – 27 August 2018

Personal details
- Born: 29 November 1968 Pavia, Italy
- Died: 27 August 2018 (aged 49) Pavia, Italy
- Party: Five Star Movement
- Occupation: Politician

Iolanda Nanni (29 November 1968 – 27 August 2018) was an Italian politician for Five Star Movement. Nanni graduated from the classical high school, before becoming a politician she worked as an employee in a private company.

In the regional elections in Lombardy in 2013 she was elected Regional Councilor, among the ranks of the 5 Star Movement in the Province of Pavia.

In January 2018 she decided to run for the 2018 parliamentary elections in the Chamber of Deputies despite being ill. She was elected to the Chamber in its constituency with 21.88% of the votes.

She had been diagnosed with cancer and died on 27 August 2018 at the age of 49. Valentina Barzotti took her place in the Chamber.

== Biography ==
Iolanda Nanni was born on November 29, 1968, in Pavia.

In 2013, she was elected to the Lombardy Regional Council.

Despite being diagnosed with cancer, she decided to run in the 2018 general election and was elected to Parliament in March. She died on August 27, 2018, in Pavia, and was replaced by Valentina Barzotti.
