= Ferdinand Willeit =

Italian politician and lawyer (1938–2018)

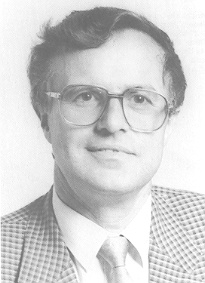
Ferdinand Willeit

Ferdinand Willeit (14 September 1938 – 2 August 2018) was an Italian politician and lawyer.

Born on 14 September 1938 in Franzensfeste, Willeit was trained as a lawyer. He took a leadership role in the administration of several businesses. He was elected to the Chamber of Deputies as a representative of South Tyrolean People's Party in 1987, serving until 1992. He died in Verona on 2 August 2018.
