= Laura Spong =

American painter (1926–2018)

- Born: Laura Alice Miles; February 20, 1926; Nashville, Tennessee
- Died: August 13, 2018 (aged 92); Columbia, South Carolina
- Occupation: Painter
- Spouse: Ernest Maye Spong Jr.
- Awards: Elizabeth O’Neill Verner Award, South Carolina Arts Commission, 2017

Laura Spong (February 20, 1926 – August 13, 2018) was an American painter whose career spanned more than 50 years. In her later years, she emerged as one of South Carolina’s leading non-objective artists, primarily associated with Abstract Expressionism. Fellow artist Mary Gilkerson described her work as “movement between calligraphic and pictographic, alluding to, without ever specifying, representational images.”

== Early life and education ==
Laura Alice Miles was born in Nashville, Tennessee, one of three daughters of Thomas Edwin Miles, Sr. and Mary Jared Bryan. She graduated cum laude from Vanderbilt University where she majored in English and first took drawing classes in 1948. She married later that year and moved with her husband to Columbia, South Carolina. Between 1949 and 1959, Spong had six children.

== Career ==
Beginning in the mid-1950s, Spong took art classes at the Richland Art School of the Columbia Museum of Art. Among her instructors there were J. Bardin and Gil Petroff, two of the modern artists who introduced New York School paradigms to mid-century Columbia. Spong became a member of the Columbia Artists' Guild and in 1957 she was one of three winners of the guild's spring exhibition at the Columbia Museum of Art. From that year, Spong was an active member of the Columbia art community and her work was often recognized by inclusion in juried exhibitions and awards in the region.

After her husband died in 1973, Spong worked for the Columbia Department of Parks and Recreation for ten years but continued to paint and exhibit. It was not until the mid to late-1980s, however, that Spong became a full-time artist. She took a studio space at Vista Studios in downtown Columbia in 1991. She was enormously productive thereafter with her work seen in many solo and group exhibitions, receiving awards, and being acquired for public and private collections. She was active to the end of her life, completing works shortly before her death.

== Work ==
From the beginning of her career, Spong worked mostly in a vernacular associated with Abstract Expressionism. Her mature style developed gradually, moving away from geometric to more organic gesture in the late 1980s and early 1990s. According to Mary Bentz Gilkerson, Spong's mature work has more affinity with the paintings of Robert Motherwell and Joan Mitchell, than with Jackson Pollock. "Line in her work," according to Gilkerson, "moves between calligraphic and pictographic, alluding to, without ever specifying, representational images."

== Selected exhibitions ==
- “Articles
- Auction results
- Artworks
- Exhibitions
- Biography
