= Szczepan Wesoły =

Polish Catholic titular archbishop and auxiliary bishop (1926–2018)

Szczepan Wesoły (16 October 1926 – 28 August 2018) was a Polish Catholic titular archbishop and auxiliary bishop.

Wesoły was born in Poland and was ordained to the priesthood in 1956. He served as auxiliary bishop of the Archdiocese of Gniezno, Poland and was titular archbishop of Dragonara from 1968 to 2003.
