= Alexander Shihwarg =

British poet and restaurateur (1923–2018)

- Born: 30 January 1923; United Kingdom
- Died: 20 August 2018 (aged 95)
- Military career
- Unit: Hong Kong Volunteer Defence Corps
- Conflicts: World War II

Alexander "Shura" Shihwarg (30 January 1923 - 20 August 2018) was a poet and restaurateur known for his membership of the "Chelsea Set" in London in the 1950s. During the Second World War he fought with the Hong Kong Volunteer Defence Corps and his reminiscences are the subject of an oral history recording at the Imperial War Museum.
