= Split Costs =

- Directed by: Jeffrey B. Palmer
- Starring: Mela Hudson; Tori Hall
- Music by: Kai Engel
- Production company: Flicker Pictures
- Distributed by: Amazon Video
- Release date: July 16, 2016 (Bluestocking)
- Running time: 20 minutes
- Country: United States
- Language: English

Split Costs is a 2016 dramatic short film, written and directed by Jeffrey B. Palmer. The film premiered at the 2016 Bluestocking Film Festival in Portland, Maine, where it received an Audience Choice Award. Since then, the film has received 15 awards, and has 14 nominations.

== Cast ==
- Mela Hudson as Emma
- Tori Hall as Judy
- Jane Harte as Brenda
- Lauren Kirby as Helen

== Plot ==
The story begins in Boston, Massachusetts in the dead of winter, where Emma (Mela Hudson) picks up a young woman named Judy (Tori Hall), for a ride share to Western Massachusetts so that Judy can surprise her girlfriend Helen (Lauren Kirby), and Emma can hopefully score some money from her mother Brenda (Jane Harte). The two women begin their journey listening to mix tapes, and forcing small talk. Emma hits a pothole on the highway and the glove compartment opens to reveal a gun. Judy becomes extremely uncomfortable and confronts Emma about the weapon. Emma tells Judy that she has to protect herself due to the fact that she lives in her car, and the two get into an argument. The argument dwindles down as the car's check engine light comes on and forces them to stop for a while.

They sit down at a Panera Bread, and Emma tries to call her mother, but there is no answer. As they finish their meals and head back to the car, Judy offers to look under the hood to see what is causing it to overheat. She explains that the car needs oil and coolant, and offers to chip in for this as payment for the ride. As Judy walks off, Emma tries her mother again, but there is still no answer.

As they continue driving towards their destinations, now with heat in the car, they celebrate and Emma expresses her gratitude. Their relationship improves and they become closer to each other. But as Emma arrives in front of Helen's apartment, and says goodbye to her new friend, she is overwhelmed with the feeling of loneliness once again.

Judy quietly sneaks through the door and sits down at the dining room table as she listens to her girlfriend sing in the shower. Without warning, another voice can be heard. Judy suddenly realizes that Helen is being unfaithful and Judy decides to exact her revenge on an oversize Teddy Bear, hacking its head off with a kitchen knife. She arranges the bear's head, along with an upside down box of baked goods she brought as a gift, on the table and leaves.

Emma arrives at her mother's motel where she takes a swig of an alcoholic beverage, and smokes a cigarette before trying the door. When her mother doesn't answer after a moment of knocking, Emma decides to crawl through the window. Once inside, she finds her mother's cellphone on the nightstand, and then proceeds to rummage through her belongings in hopes of finding money. But an unexpected twist awaits her in the bathroom. As she turns the corner, her mother lies on the floor, a victim of a heroine overdose. Emma crumbles and falls to the floor, sobbing and trying to convince herself that her mother is just unconscious. After a moment of screaming for her mother to wake up, she leaves the motel room. Back in her car, she makes a phone call and sirens can be heard in the distance. Afterwards, Emma joins Judy at a cafe and they console each other.

Moments later they sit by a bridge and discuss throwing Emma's gun into the creek below. She steps up to the railing and throws the gun in the water. Emma rejoins Judy in the car and they decide to drive down south and get "umbrella drinks".

== Reception ==
Richard Propes of The Independent Critic wrote in his review, "Excellent pacing and editing along with emotionally honest, and disciplined performances from both Mela Hudson and Tori Hall."

Laura MacLeod of Movie Critic Next Door said, "Utterly convincing ... a taut drama with dialog that hits all the right notes."

Jacqui Blue of Film Inquiry wrote, "Emma walks into a nightmare and her world is turned upside down. With a strong performance from Hudson, this point in Split Costs actually had me fighting back tears. I felt her pain as if it was mine."

Kirk Fernwood of One Film Fan's review said, "Formidable in its message, convincing in its execution, and deeply human in its raw portrayal of both the strength and frailty of relationships and their impact on our state of being ... another shining example of the much more grounded nature of stories found within independent cinema."

=== Accolades ===
Split Costs won Best Drama, Best Overall, and both Hudson and Hall both received Best Actress awards at the Women's Only Entertainment Film Festival (July 2016). At the Bluestocking Film Series (July 2016), the film received an Audience Choice Award. Hudson was nominated for Best Actress in a Short Film at the Hudson Valley International Film Festival (August 2016). They accepted Best Screenplay at the Destiny City Film Festival (Aug 2016). Mela Hudson accepted the Award of Merit for Leading Actress at the Best Shorts Competition (September 2016). Palmer and Hudson were both nominated for a SOFIE Award in the categories Best Director, and Best Actress at the Short Film Awards (December 2016). The film won Best Screenplay at the Sandbar International Film Awards (December 2016), and won Best Director, Best Ensemble Performance, Best Screenplay, Best Editing, and an Award of Excellence in Storytelling at the Stories by the River Film Festival (January 2017). At the Red Carpet Cine Fest (January 2017), the film won Best USA Short Film. The film won a Silver Award, and Hudson was nominated for Best Actress at the North American Film Awards (January 2017). At the Creative Arts Film Festival (March 2017), the film was nominated in the categories Best Dramatic Short Film, Best Screenplay, and Best Motion Picture Editing. Split Costs most recently won Best Short Film at the Twin Falls Film Festival (October 2017). Split Costs was nominated for Best Short Film, and Best Screenplay at the Romford Film Festival (May 2018). Hudson won Best Supporting Actress, beating Kate Mulgrew by one point.
