= John D. P. Meldrum =

British mathematician

John David Philip Meldrum (18 July 1940 in Rabat, Morocco; died 9 August 2018 in Edinburgh, Scotland) was a British mathematician. Meldrum was an algebraist and his research was mostly related to group theory.

== Biography ==
Meldrum was born in Rabat, Morocco.

In 1964 he was appointed as a supernumerary fellow and college lecturer in mathematics at Emmanuel College. Meldrum received his PhD from the University of Cambridge in 1967 on the topic of "Central Series in Wreath Products". His supervisor was Derek Roy Taunt.

In 1969 he became a lecturer for mathematics at the University of Edinburgh and in 1982 he was appointed there as a senior lecturer.

He died on 9 August 2018 in Edinburgh after a battle with the Parkinson's disease.

== Books ==
=== As an author ===
- John D. P. Meldrum (1985). Near-rings and Their Links with Groups. Longman Higher Education. ISBN 978-0273087014.
- John D. P. Meldrum (1995). Wreath Products of Groups and Semigroups. Chapman and Hall/CRC. ISBN 9780582026933.

=== As a translator ===
Meldrum translated the following book by Nicolas Bourbaki:

- Nicolas Bourbaki (1994). Elements of the History of Mathematics. Translated by John D. P. Meldrum. Springer Verlag. ISBN 978-0387193762.
