= Mela Hudson =

American actress

- Born: Nicole Marie Marinucci; July 24, 1987; Poughkeepsie, New York
- Died: August 14, 2018 (aged 31); Burbank, California, U.S.
- Occupations: Actress, director, writer, Producer
- Years active: 2009–2018
- Website: melahudson.com

Mela Hudson (July 24, 1987 – August 14, 2018) was an American actress, and producer best known for her roles in Split Costs, The Sisterhood of Night, Hits, Eight, and Melancholia. Hudson made her producer debut in 2013 for such films as Presence, and Resident Evil: Red Falls. Hudson died on August 14, 2018, in Burbank, California.

== Personal life ==
Hudson was born and raised in Poughkeepsie, New York, to Michael Marinucci Jr., and Carol Ann Dalrymple. She had a brother, Michael, who is five years older, and a twin brother, Vincent. At the age of four, she belonged to the Estelle and Alfonso Performing Arts Program, and the Betty Jean Studio where she performed on stage in huge venues such as the Mid-Hudson Civic Center. She started acting at the age of eight when she was cast as the lead in her elementary school's play. She attended Holy Trinity Catholic School from first grade to third grade, then finished elementary school at Brinkerhoff Elementary. She then attended Van Wyck Junior High, and then John Jay Senior High School where she continued to act on stage, as well as build sets for the productions. She graduated from high school in 2005.

Progressing to motion picture, she then studied acting at Dutchess Community College where she focused her skill in multiple student films. In 2009 she was introduced to the New York Talent Club where she started to obtain professional on-set experience working in independent films, TV commercials, and music videos that were being shot locally. She has trained professionally at the John Pallotta Studio of Acting, and Jordan Bayne's Permission Playground in New York City. Hudson is most proud of learning from the Dustin Hoffman, and Kevin Spacey in their Masterclasses.

== Career ==
Hudson starred in the multi-award winning short film, Split Costs, written and directed by Jeffrey B. Palmer. The film premiered at the 2016 Bluestocking Film Festival in Portland, Maine, where it received an Audience Choice Award. Since then, the film has received 15 awards, and has 14 nominations, including Hudson's 3 wins, and 3 nominations.

Hudson directed and appeared in commercials and music videos, such as Deborah Harry's music video for "Mother".

Hudson appeared in David Cross' film Hits which premiered at Sundance Film Festival in 2014.

In October 2014, Hudson announced that she was creating her first animation film, Tomboy. She had written it as a short story at first, but then soon after decided to adapt it to screen.

== Philanthropy ==
In September 2016 Hudson started volunteering her time monthly with the Play For Your Freedom an organization focused on helping veterans suffering from PTSD through wellness workshops. In an interview she said, "These things have always been important to me in my life. It is important that we use our position to do good in the world." Some of Hudson's charities include those devoted to fighting hunger, domestic violence, and suicide prevention.

== Filmography ==
Year	Title	Role	Notes
2018	Eight	Sara	Lead role short film
2018	Melancholia	Becky Shackle	Supporting short film
2016	Split Costs	Emma	Lead role short film
2016	Pick Me Up	Jen	Lead role
2014	The Sisterhood of Night	Secret Sisterhood Girl	
2014	Hits	Juli's Friend	
2013	Where Is My Golden Arm	Alisha	short film
2012	Men in Black 3	Downtown Hipster	
2012	The Curse of Ba'al	Natalie	Supporting
2010	Z Day	Katherine	Supporting

== Television ==
Year	Title	Role	Notes
2018	The Coroner: I Speak for the Dead	Amanda Rylie, EMT	1 Episode
2015–present	Essence Cartoon	Elmo / Shannon (voice)	6 Episodes
2014	Celebrity Paranormal Lockdown	Herself	Episode: "Madison Seminary"
2013	Blue Bloods	Helpful Stranger	Episodes: "Unwritten Rules" & "The City That Never Sleeps" (uncredited)
2011–2012	I Just Want My Pants Back	Bartender	Episodes: "Pilot" & "Baby Monkeys"

=== Producer ===
Year	Title	Notes
2018	Luz	Executive Producer
2018	Eight	Executive Producer, producer
2016	Rainbow Six: Plan B	Producer
2015	Hybrid Vigor	Associate Producer
2013	Resident Evil: Red Falls	Co-Executive Producer
2013	Presence	Executive Producer

=== Director / Screenwriter ===
Year	Title
2018	Eight

== Awards ==
=== Accolades ===
Hudson started to gain recognition after playing Emma in the short film, Split Costs, in which she received three awards in the categories: Award of Merit for Leading Actress at the Best Shorts Competition (September 2016), Best Actress at the Women's Only Entertainment Film Festival (July 2016), and shared Best Ensemble Performance with Tori Hall, Jane Harte, and Lauren Kirby at the Stories by the River Film Festival (January 2017). She also received three nominations in the categories: Best Actress at the North American Film Awards (January 2017), Best Actress in a Short Film at the Hudson Valley International Film Festival (August 2016), and a SOFIE Award for Best Actress at the Short Film Awards (December 2016). She has also won a People's Choice Award at the Coleman Awards (September 2012), out of seventy-five nominees nationwide, and Best Supporting Broad at the Broad Humor Awards (July 2015). and was nominated for Best Actress in Social Media at the Shorty Awards.

Year	Ceremony	Category	Title	Result
2018	Romford Film Festival	Best Supporting Actress	Split Costs	Won
2017	Stories by The River Film Festival	Best Ensemble Performance	Split Costs	Won
2016	The Short Film Awards	SOFIE Award – Best Lead Actress	Split Costs	Nominated
2016	North American Film Awards	Best Actress in a Short Film	Split Costs	Nominated
2016	Best Shorts Competition	Award of Merit for Leading Actress	Split Costs	Won
2016	Hudson Valley International Film Festival	Best Actress in a Short Film	Split Costs	Nominated
2016	Women's Only Entertainment Film Festival	Best Actress	Split Costs	Won
2015	The Broad Humor Awards	Best Supporting Broad		Won
2015	Shorty Awards	Best Actress in Social Media		Nominated
2012	Coleman Awards	People's Choice Award		Won
