= Susan Ciriclio =

American photographer and educator (1946–2018)

Susan Efay Ciriclio
- Born: November 27, 1946; New York City, United States
- Died: August 19, 2018 (aged 71)
- Known for: Photography
- Awards: National Endowment for the Arts Fellowship, 1979

Susan Efay Ciriclio (November 27, 1946 – August 19, 2018), also known as S.E. Ciriclio, was an American photographer and educator known for her photographic mapping project Neighborhood.

She lived and worked in Oakland, California. Ciriclio worked for 40 years as a professor of photography at California College of the Arts (CCA), retiring as Professor Emerita in 2017.

== Life and education ==
Ciriclio was born in 1946 in New York City, grew up in Westchester County, New York and later moved to Phoenix, Arizona. While she was a student at Phoenix College, she worked as a dispatcher and crime scene photographer for the Phoenix Police Department.

She received an A.A. from Phoenix College in 1969, a B.F.A. from California College of Arts and Crafts in 1972, and a M.F.A. from Mills College in 1974.

== Career ==
Early in her teaching career, Ciriclio was an instructor in photography at Chabot College and the San Francisco Art Institute. She chaired CCA's photography program from 1988 to 1992 and again from 1999 to 2008.

In addition to serving as a professor of photography at the California College of the Arts, she was interim Vice President for Academic Affairs from 1986 to 1987 and Vice President for Academic Affairs from 1989 to 1992. In addition to her work as a photography educator and academic administrator, Ciriclio served on the board of directors of San Francisco Camerawork from 1983 to 1986.

== Awards and fellowships ==
In 1979, Ciriclio was awarded a National Endowment for the Arts Fellowship.

== Works ==
Ciriclio's map projects explore the chronicling of place, combining large-scale map replicas with thousands of detailed photographs of an area to create works that function both sculpturally and temporally.

Ciriclio cites her day to day surroundings as inspiration in her photographic practice; she searches out visual texture in the ordinariness of her suburban environment and neighborhood, documenting the visual landscape over time and compiling photographs into map works and book works.

Ciriclio's Neighborhood was exhibited in 1977 as part of the group exhibition San Francisco/Los Angeles/New York at the San Francisco Art Institute and in 1980 as a solo exhibition at the University of California, Davis Memorial Union Art Gallery. The work depicted the ordinary features of her suburban neighborhood in a way that viewers could associate with their own neighborhoods, whether in San Francisco, Salt Lake City, or Atlanta. Hal Fischer described Ciriclio's piece as "sympathetic to the New Topographics genre ".

Another of Ciriclio's works, "Haddon Roadwork" was featured as part of a group exhibition at 1708 Gallery in Richmond, Virginia in 1985 when it was known as 1708 East Main. Similar to Ciriclio's "Neighborhood", "Haddon Roadwork" also involved creating a map with pictures she had taken of houses along the streets of her neighborhood. As Mitchell Kahan wrote in Art Papers, "There is neither an aestheticized quality to them nor the cool detached aura of scientific documentation. They are as off hand and casual as a realtor's handbook".

== Selected exhibitions ==
Ciriclio's work has been featured in solo and group exhibitions.

=== Solo exhibitions ===
Susan Ciriclio had a solo exhibit at the Memorial Union Art Gallery at UC Davis in 1980.

=== Group exhibitions ===
Susan Ciriclio's work has been selected for group exhibition including the following:

- deYoung Museum, San Francisco, New Photography: San Francisco and the Bay Area (1974)
- San Francisco Art Institute, San Francisco Los Angeles New York (1977)
- San Francisco Museum of Modern Art, Billboard Show (1979)
- 1708 Gallery, Richmond, and SF Camerawork, San Francisco, Artists and Photographic Installations (1985)
- Axiom Centre for the Arts, Cheltenham, England, California Women in Photography (1987)
- Seibu Museum of Art, Tokyo, Young Californians (1989)
- Museum of New Mexico, Santa Fe, Forecast (1994)
- Kiyosato Museum of Photographic Arts, Yamanashi, Japan, An Artist and His Circle (1998)

== Collections ==
Ciriclio's work is held in many permanent collections including:

- San Francisco Museum of Modern Art, San Francisco
- Oakland Museum, Oakland
- Barnsdall Collection, Los Angeles
- Seibu Museum, Tokyo
- Kiyosato Museum of Photographic Arts, Yamanashi, Japan
- Mills College, Oakland
