= Abraham Eisenstark =

American professor of microbiology

Abraham Eisenstark (born September 5, 1919, Warsaw, Poland – August 28, 2018) was an American professor of microbiology. He was a Guggenheim Fellow for the academic year 1958–1959.

== Biography ==
As a child, Eisenstark immigrated to the United States from Poland. After education (including junior college) in Kansas City public schools, he graduated with A.B. and M.A. from the University of Illinois. His study for a Ph.D. in microbiology was interrupted by WW II. He became a technical sergeant in the 8th Medical Laboratory of the U.S. Army Medical Service from 1942 to 1945. His service in the Pacific involved diagnostic procedures for malaria. He returned to graduate study at the University of Illinois and became a research assistant in charge of electron microscopy.

As part of his Ph.D. dissertation, which he completed in 1948, he showed that penicillin worked to stop infection by interfering with the cell wall during bacterial division. The results of his work were published in Science magazine in 1947.

(Note: The tribute to Eisenstark from the Division of Biological Sciences at the University of Missouri cited the wrong journal for his work on penicillin. This work was published in the Journal of Bacteriology. The paper that appeared in the journal Science in 1947 reported electron micrographs of X-ray treated Escherichia coli.)

Eisenstark was a faculty member from 1948 to 1951 at Oklahoma State University and from 1951 to 1971 at Kansas State University. For the academic year 1958–1959 he was on sabbatical as a Guggenheim Fellow at Ole Maaløe's laboratory in Copenhagen. From 1968 to 1969 he spent 15 months on sabbatical at the National Science Foundation as a program director for molecular biology. In 1971 he resigned from Kansas State University to become a professor at the University of Missouri, where he was the head of the Division of Biological Sciences from 1971 to 1980.

Some of his contributions were highlighted in the Division's Fall 1991 Alumni Newsletter. They include defining the nature of Newcastle virus and the observation of "incomplete" viral particles usable for use in vaccines; development of "recombinationless" strains of Salmonella typhimurium; the discovery that bacteriophage can transfer plasmid genes as well as chromosomal genes; and the establishment of the antigenic and morphological properties of the mutator phage, mu-1, a bacterial virus that has been important for understanding gene transposition and the development of molecular genetics

At the University of Missouri, in 1990 he went into mandatory retirement as professor emeritus. In 1990 he became the director of Cancer Research Center (near Ellis Fischel Cancer Center) in Columbia, Missouri. There he continued doing research for the next twenty years.

Eisenstark supervised 20 doctoral students. His first wife, Roma Gould Eisenstark of Chickasha Oklahoma, died in 1984. They had a daughter and two sons. His second wife was Joan Ragsdell Eisenstark. Abe Eisenstark died on August 28, 2018. A memorial/ birthday celebration was held later that week on what would have been his 99th birthday at the Unitarian Fellowship in Columbia Missouri.

== Selected publications ==
=== Articles ===
- Eisenstark, A.; Clark, G. L. (1947). "Electron Micrographs of X-Ray—treated Escherichia coli Cells". Science. 105 (2734): 553–555. Bibcode:1947Sci...105..553E. doi:10.1126/science.105.2734.553.b. PMID 17752778. S2CID 28362946.
- Eisenstark, A. (1965). "Mutagen-induced hybridization of Salmonella typhimurium LT2 X Escherichia coli K12 Hfr". Proceedings of the National Academy of Sciences. 54 (1): 117–120. doi:10.1073/pnas.54.1.117. ISSN 0027-8424. PMC 285806. PMID 5323014.
- Ackermann, Hans-W.; Eisenstark, Abraham (1974). "The Present State of Phage Taxonomy". Intervirology. 3 (4): 201–219. doi:10.1159/000149758. ISSN 1423-0100. PMID 4461697.
- McCormick, J. P.; Fischer, J. R.; Pachlatko, J. P.; Eisenstark, A. (1976). "Characterization of a cell-lethal product from the photooxidation of tryptophan: Hydrogen peroxide". Science. 191 (4226): 468–469. doi:10.1126/science.1108203. PMID 1108203.
- Hartman, P. S.; Eisenstark, A.; Pauw, P. G. (1979). "Inactivation of phage T7 by near-ultraviolet radiation plus hydrogen peroxide: DNA-protein crosslinks prevent DNA injection". Proceedings of the National Academy of Sciences. 76 (7): 3228–3232. Bibcode:1979PNAS...76.3228H. doi:10.1073/pnas.76.7.3228. PMC 383797. PMID 290998.
- Sak, B. D.; Eisenstark, A.; Touati, D. (1989). "Exonuclease III and the catalase hydroperoxidase II in Escherichia coli are both regulated by the katF gene product". Proceedings of the National Academy of Sciences. 86 (9): 3271–3275. Bibcode:1989PNAS...86.3271S. doi:10.1073/pnas.86.9.3271. PMC 287112. PMID 2541439.
- Eisenstark, Abraham; Miller, Cathy; Jones, Joyce; Leven, Sara (1992). "Escherichia coli genes involved in cell survival during dormancy: Role of oxidative stress". Biochemical and Biophysical Research Communications. 188 (3): 1054–1059. Bibcode:1992BBRC..188.1054E. doi:10.1016/0006-291X(92)91338-Q. PMID 1445342.
- Ivanova, Anna; Miller, Cathy; Glinsky, Gennadi; Eisenstark, Abraham (1994). "Role of rpoS (KatF) in oxyR-independent regulation of hydroperoxidase I in Escherichia coli". Molecular Microbiology. 12 (4): 571–578. doi:10.1111/j.1365-2958.1994.tb01043.x. PMID 7934880. S2CID 39191907.
- Ahmad, S. I.; Kirk, S. H.; Eisenstark, A. (1998). "Thymine Metabolism and Thymineless Death in Prokaryotes and Eukaryotes". Annual Review of Microbiology. 52: 591–625. doi:10.1146/annurev.micro.52.1.591. PMID 9891809.
- Eisenstark, Abraham (1998). "Bacterial gene products in response to near-ultraviolet radiation". Mutation Research/Fundamental and Molecular Mechanisms of Mutagenesis. 422 (1): 85–95. Bibcode:1998MRFMM.422...85E. doi:10.1016/S0027-5107(98)00178-X. PMID 9920431.
- Wang, Cheng-Zhi; Kazmierczak, Robert A.; Eisenstark, Abraham (2016). "Strains, Mechanism, and Perspective: Salmonella-Based Cancer Therapy". International Journal of Microbiology. 2016: 1–10. doi:10.1155/2016/5678702. PMC 4848419. PMID 27190519.

=== Books ===
- Schatten, H.; Eisenstark, A. (22 August 2007). Schatten, Heide; Eisenstark, Abraham (eds.). Salmonella: Methods and Protocols. Methods in Molecular Biology. Vol. 394. pp. v–vi. doi:10.1007/978-1-59745-512-1. ISBN 978-1-58829-619-1. PMID 18389936. S2CID 265865660.
