= Samir Salameh =

French painter

Personal details
- Born: 16 August 1944 Safed, Palestine
- Died: 16 August 2018 (aged 74) Le Grand-Lucé, France
- Party: Palestine Liberation Organization
- Education: Faculty of Fine Arts of the Damascus University
- Alma mater: École des Beaux-Arts
- Occupation: Visual artist

Samir Salameh (Arabic: سمير سلامة; 16 August 1944 – 16 August 2018) was a Palestinian-born French visual artist, known for painting.

== Early life ==
Salameh was born in the city of Safed, Palestine on 16 August 1944 and on the impact of the 1948 exodus was forced to move with his family to the city of Majd al-Krum in Galilee, and from there to the Bint Jbeil village in Lebanon. Samir stayed with there for a short time, and continued his career in Beirut and Damascus, and finally settled in the monastery of the Christian community on the shield.

== Career ==
Salameh began painting early, and received encouragement from the art teacher, a Syrian artist named Adham Ismail. He entered the faculty of fine arts of the Damascus University, and finished his studies in 1972 and then moved to Beirut, where he joined Palestine Liberation Organization. He participated in several collective exhibitions in Beirut, as well as numerous international exhibitions on Palestine. He contributed to the structuring of the Union of Arab Artists, being Ismail Shammout the first General Secretary.

In 1975, Samir moved to Paris, France to continue his studies at École des Beaux-Arts, in front of the Louvre Museum, and when he received his residency he discovered on the sheet card that his birthplace was in Israel. He opposed that and knew that his nationality "was special," but Samir fought a few years later a war over the adoption of Safed / Palestine as a place of birth in his passport and the French had in the previous mission success in achieving them.

After Samir finished his education and settled in France, he received a job in the Department of Arabic Literature at UNESCO Headquarters.

Samir participated in a series of foreign art exhibitions in Japan, Sweden, Germany, Morocco, Egypt, Jordan and more, and several exhibitions in French cities. He has established an international exhibition in Beirut under the supervision of Mona Saudi, then moved to Tokyo before returning to Beirut and exhibiting paintings destroyed by warplanes bombed during the Israeli invasion of Lebanon in June 1982.

In 1996 he returned to Safed for the first time, but could not find his childhood home. Received in Ramallah, a presidential decree appointing him as an advisor to the Ministry of Culture. He worked for two years in the design of International Red Cross and Red Crescent Movement hospital in Khan Yunis. In 2005 Samir exposed for first time in Palestine. President of Palestine, Mahmoud Abbas, granted him the Order of Culture, Arts and Science in recognition of his career and for his role in the creation of the Faculty of Fine Arts and Media in the PLO.

== Death ==
Samir Salama died on 16 August 2018 in Le Grand Lucé.
