= Don Garrison =

American lawyer and politician (1925–2018)

Member of the Texas House of Representatives
- In office January 10, 1961 – October 1, 1966

Personal details
- Born: May 23, 1925 Los Angeles, California, U.S.
- Died: August 13, 2018 (aged 93) Leesport, Pennsylvania, U.S.
- Party: Democratic
- Profession: Attorney

Donald E. Garrison (May 23, 1925 – August 13, 2018) was an American lawyer and politician.

== Political career ==
He served as a Democratic member in the Texas House of Representatives from 1961 to 1966.

== Biography ==
Garrison was born in Los Angeles, California. He graduated from El Monte High School, in El Monte, California. He served in the United States Army during World War II. He then went to Stanford University for three years. During the Korean War, Garrison served in the United States Air Force and was commissioned a captain. In 1964, Garrison received his law degree from South Texas College of Law and practiced law in Houston, Texas. He died at Berks Heim Nursing Facility in Leesport, Pennsylvania.
