= Peter Chadwick (mathematician) =

British applied mathematician and physicist

- Born: 23 March 1931; Huddersfield, England
- Died: 12 August 2018 (aged 87)
- Education: University of Manchester; Pembroke College, Cambridge

Peter Chadwick FRS (23 March 1931 – 12 August 2018) was a British applied mathematician and physicist.

A Huddersfield native born on 23 March 1931, Chadwick attended the University of Manchester (BSc, 1952) and completed his PhD at Pembroke College, Cambridge in 1957. He was Professor of Mathematics at the University of East Anglia from 1965 to 1991, and was made a Fellow of the Royal Society in 1977. He died on 12 August 2018, aged 87.
