= Marisa Sánchez =

Spanish chef, gourmet and businesswoman

Marisa Sánchez Echaurren (27 January 1933 – 19 August 2018) was a Spanish chef, gourmet and businesswoman. In 1987, she received the National Prize of Gastronomy for the Best Chef, awarded by the Royal Academy of Gastronomy. In 2008, she was awarded the Medal of Merit at Work. In 2012, the Government of La Rioja granted it the distinction of "Riojana Ilustre".

Born in Ezcaray, La Rioja, Marisa Sánchez led the fourth generation of the restaurateur family that owns the nowadays known as Hotel Echaurren Gastronómico. According to the parish archives of Ezcaray, as early as 1698 an inn was located in front of the church that offered lodging and stables. In 1861, Pedro Echaurren and Andrea García, grandparents of Marisa, acquired the sale and transformed it into Hostal Echaurren.

She learned the science and art of cooking with his great-aunt and teacher of Ezcaray, Andrea Garcia, his aunt Cristina García and his mother, Julia García. Among her most famous dishes is the croquette, praised by the public and critics, but also other preparations such as monkfish with clams, fish soup from Echaurren, pochas a la riojana with tomato fry, "grandmother's meatballs", Hake with the romana, the lamb legs or the corns with calf snouts.

Her work began to be recognized by critics and institutions in the eighties. The first to include Marisa Sánchez in the gastronomic map of the critics were Xavier Domingo and Rafael Ansón. He was the mother of Francis Paniego, Spanish chef with two Michellin Stars.

== Publications ==
- Echaurren: el sabor de la memoria
- La cocina del vino y los cinco sentidos: tradición y modernidad
