= Multicultural art =

Multicultural art concentrates on pieces of creativity that have an essence of a certain cultural theme. Kristen Ali Eglinton, in her 2003 book Art in the Early Years, defined multicultural art as "the study of artistic and aesthetic endeavors of the people and cultures that form the non-Western world".

Multicultural art revolves around dance, music, graffiti and many other mediums of many cultures and races who express passion for the city life. Cultures inspire many people on a global level to send political, positive and unique messages to the public in an artistic and creative way.

== See also ==
- Multiculturalism
