= Valentina Barzotti =

Italian politician

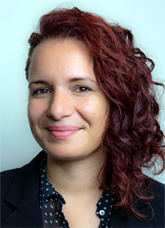

Member of the Chamber of Deputies of Italy
- Incumbent
- Assumed office 2018
- Constituency: LOMBARDIA 4 - 01

Personal details
- Born: February 5, 1986 (age 40) Milan
- Party: 5 Star Movement

Valentina Barzotti is a member of the Chamber of Deputies of Italy.

She was elected in 2018 and re-elected in 2022.

== Biography ==
Born in Milan but currently residing in Lodi, Lombardy, she earned a high school diploma in classical studies before going on to earn a law degree from the University of Bologna and a degree in political science from the University of Milan; she is a practicing attorney.

In the 2018 general election, she ran for the Chamber of Deputies as the third candidate on the Five Star Movement (M5S) list in the Lombardy 4 - 01 multi-member constituency, but finished as the highest-ranking unelected candidate. On September 11, 2018, she became a deputy, succeeding the late Iolanda Nanni. During the 18th legislature, she served on the 9th Committee on Transport, Post, and Telecommunications (2018–2019), the 11th Committee on Public and Private Employment (2019–2022), and the Parliamentary Commission of Inquiry on Consumer and User Protection (2021–2022), in addition to serving as deputy leader of the M5S Parliamentary group in the Chamber of Deputies (2021–2022).

In the 2022 early general election, she ran again for the Chamber of Deputies both in the single-member constituency of Lombardy 4 - 02 (Lodi) and as the lead candidate for the Five Star Movement in the multi-member constituency of Lombardy 4 - 01 , and this time was elected as a deputy in the multi-member district, while in the single-member district she received 8.45% of the vote but was surpassed by center-right candidate Fabio Raimondo (53.95%) and center-left candidate Paolo Costanzo (25.12%)[9]. In the 19th legislature, she is a member of the 11th Committee on Public and Private Employment, the Parliamentary inquiry committee on Working Conditions in Italy, Exploitation, and the Protection of Health and Safety in Public and Private Workplaces, the Judicial Committee for Personnel, and the Committee on Legislation, where she serves as chair.

In December 2023, he became a member of the M5S Youth Policy Committee.
