= Rosa Ríos =

Bolivian actress and theater director

Rosa Ríos Valdivia (17 April 1935 – 19 August 2018) was a Bolivian actress and theater director.

Born in La Paz, she was a policewoman for 24 years. Ríos debuted in the work directed by Raúl Salmón, Condeuyo, la calle del pecado. She also worked in musical works under the direction of Tito Landa, in works such as Los Jaraneros, La ocasión hace al ladrón or La Rosita; with David Santalla in "Toribio Satanás"; with Hugo Pozo in "La Rebelión de las Cholas" or "Zambo Salbito"; with Ninón Dávalos in "Bajo el panorama del puente" and with Juan Barrera in "Rupertita, la Maestra Mayor".

It was characterized by the interpretation of characters characterized as Bolivian chola, a Bolivian indigenous. She died on 19 August 2018 at the age of 83 after suffering a stroke.

== Works ==
=== Theater ===
- Condeuyo, la calle del pecado
- Toribio Satanás
- La Rebelión de las Cholas
- Zambo Salbito
- Bajo el Panorama del Puente
- Rupertita, la Maestra Mayor
- La Sanguchera de la esquina
- El calvario de mi madre
- Me avergüenzan tu polleras 1
- Me avergüenzan tu polleras 2

=== Musicals ===
- Los Jaraneros
- La ocasión hace al ladrón
- La Rosita
- El calvario de mi madre

=== Cinema ===
- Cuestión de Fe
- Corazón de Jesús
- American Visa
- No le digas
- Postales a Copacabana
- El Gran Escape
- Forgotten
