= Wilfred Sircus =

British gastroenterologist (1919–2018)

Wilfred "Bill" Sircus (26 November 1919 – 12 August 2018) was a British gastroenterologist.

== Early life and education ==
Sircus was born on 26 November 1919 in Liverpool to Jewish immigrants. He studied medicine at Liverpool University, which was interrupted by his service in the Royal Army Medical Corps during World War II. He graduated with distinction upon resuming his studies post-war.

== Career ==
From 1953, Sircus spent the majority of his career at the Western General Hospital and the University of Edinburgh, where he was instrumental in establishing the first specialized gastrointestinal unit in the UK.

Sircus' research was focused on gastrointestinal physiology and the clinical applications of endoscopy. He played a major role in expanding the facilities at Western General Hospital, including securing funding for new laboratory suites. Sircus also held leadership positions in several gastroenterological and endoscopic societies.

== Personal life ==
Outside of his medical career, Sircus had a keen interest in his cultural heritage and the arts. He was married twice and had three children. Sircus died of natural causes in Cupar, Bow of Fife, at the age of 98, survived by his partner Anna Caplan.
