= Jakob Schönenberger =

Swiss politician

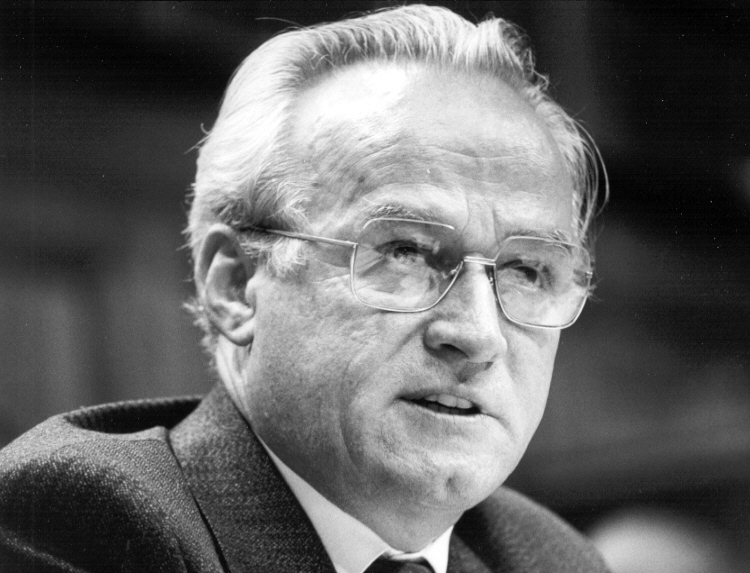

Member of Council of States
- In office 1979–1991

Personal details
- Born: 2 October 1931 Kirchberg, St. Gallen, Switzerland
- Died: 1 August 2018 (aged 86) Kirchberg, St. Gallen, Switzerland
- Children: Andrea Gmür-Schönenberger
- Education: University of Freiburg

Jakob Schönenberger (2 October 1931 – 1 August 2018), was a Swiss conservative politician for Christian Democratic People's Party of Switzerland, banker and Oberst.

Schönenberger attended high school in Einsiedeln before completing a law degree at the University of Freiburg. In 1959 he made the St. Gallen Bar and doctorate in 1960 with the title of Dr. med. iur. also in Freiburg. From 1977 he worked as a lawyer in Wil.

From 1961 to 1976 Schönenberger was a municipal councilor in Kirchberg and from 1968 to 1980 for the CVP in the Canton of St. Gallen Kantonsrat. From 1979 to 1991 he sat in the Council of States. As Oberst, he presided the Divisional Court 7. He sat down among other things for financial policy issues. He later was from 1978 to 1996 President of the Swiss Clothing Industry Association, from 1985 to 1999 member of the Bank Council of the Swiss National Bank, which he chaired from 1993 to 1999, and from 1985 to 2000 a member of the Board of Directors of Helvetia Insurance.

His daughter Andrea Gmür-Schönenberger was also elected CVP politician and in 2015 in the National Council.
