= Graham Bond (gymnast) =

Australian artistic gymnast

- Full name: Graham Francis Bond
- Born: 6 May 1937
- Died: 17 August 2018 (aged 81)
- Height: 5 ft 9.5 in (177 cm)

Gymnastics career
- Discipline: Men's artistic gymnastics
- Country represented: Australia

Graham Francis Bond (6 May 1937 – 17 August 2018) was an Australian gymnast who competed at three Olympic Games. He competed at the 1956 Melbourne, 1960 Rome and 1964 Tokyo Olympics. He was inducted into the Gymnastics Australia Hall of Fame in May 2018.

Bond attended the University of Queensland, graduating with a Bachelor of Engineering from the Department of Mining, Minerals and Materials Engineering in 1960. In 1961 he was awarded a Rhodes Scholarship to attend Balliol College, Oxford. In 1966 he was awarded a PhD on The application of computers to the solution of mine ventilation networks at the University of Queensland.
