= Amy Wagoner Johnson =

American materials scientist and bioengineer

Amy Jaye Wagoner Johnson (born 1974) is an American materials scientist and bioengineer whose research focuses on biomaterial, artificial bone, the reconstruction of coral reefs, and biomechanics related to reproductive health. She works at the University of Illinois Urbana-Champaign as a professor in the Department of Mechanical Science and Engineering of the Grainger College of Engineering, professor in the Department of Biomedical and Translational Sciences of the Carle Illinois College of Medicine, Andersen Faculty Scholar, and (by courtesy) professor in the Department of Bioengineering.

== Education and career ==
Wagoner Johnson was born in 1974 in Warren, Michigan, and grew up in Columbus, Ohio, where her father, Robert H. Wagoner, was a professor of metallurgical engineering at the Ohio State University. Her own interest in science and engineering began in high school, when her father took a sabbatical year in France and she studied at an international school. She majored in materials science at Ohio State and graduated in 1996. She continued her studies in materials science at Brown University, received a master's degree there in 1998, and completed her Ph.D. in 2002. Her dissertation, Deformation and failure mechanisms in Ti-6Al-4V/TiC particulate and layered composites, was jointly advised by Clyde L. Briant and K. Sharvan Kumar.

She began working at the University of Illinois Urbana-Champaign in 2001, initially as a research scientist and lecturer in the Department of Mechanical and Industrial Engineering. In 2005 she became a regular-rank faculty member. She held a chair of excellence at the Nanosciences Foundation in Grenoble from 2014 to 2017, has been professor of mechanical science and engineering and of bioengineering at the University of Illinois Urbana-Champaign since 2018, and was head of the Department of Biomedical and Translational Sciences from 2019 to 2024.

== Recognition ==
Wagoner Johnson was elected to the American Institute for Medical and Biological Engineering (AIMBE) College of Fellows in 2022, "for work in recruiting and advancing women and persons of color in academe and pioneering research in biomaterials and biomechanics". In 2024, the American Society of Mechanical Engineers (ASME) named her as an ASME Fellow, "for seminal contributions to biomechanics and biomaterials, particularly in bone regeneration, soft tissue mechanics, and coral restoration, as well as for her innovative teaching and impactful leadership in engineering and medicine".

The Society of Women Engineers gave Wagoner Johnson their Distinguished Engineering Educator Award in 2020. She is also a recipient of the 2025 M. Hetényi Award of the Society for Experimental Mechanics.
