= Tadeusz Rudolf =

Polish economist and politician (1926–2018)

Tadeusz Rudolf (22 January 1926 Bochnia— 25 August 2018 Warsaw) was a Polish economist and politician, who served as Minister of Labor and Social Policy from 21 November 1974 to 8 February 1979.
