= Jean-Baptiste Le Bescond =

French footballer (born 1980)

Personal information
- Date of birth: 9 June 1980 (age 46)
- Place of birth: Pabu, France
- Height: 1.79 m (5 ft 10 1/2 in)
- Position: Midfielder

Team information
- Current team: Paris FC
- Number: 18

Senior career*
Years	Team	Apps	(Gls)
2000–2005	En Avant de Guingamp	3	(0)
2005–2006	AS Moulins		
2006–2007	Vannes OC		
2007–2008	US Orléans		
2008–2009	FC Gueugnon		
2009–2011	Paris FC		

Managerial career
- 2011–2026: En Avant de Guingamp
- * Club domestic league appearances and goals

Jean-Baptiste Le Bescond (born 9 June 1980) is a former French professional football player, Assistant Coach of the professional Team and now Director of the Youth Center at En Avant de Guingamp.

He played on the professional level in Ligue 1 for En Avant de Guingamp.

For more than 15 years, he is specialised in identifying, recruiting and developing young players and talents for the High level.
