= Meyer Rosen =

American politician

Member of the South Carolina House of Representatives from the Georgetown County district
- In office 1963–1966

Personal details
- Born: November 17, 1919 Georgetown, South Carolina, U.S.
- Died: August 25, 2018 (aged 98) Georgetown, South Carolina, U.S.
- Occupation: lawyer

Meyer Rosen (November 17, 1919 – August 25, 2018) was an American politician from South Carolina. He served in the South Carolina House of Representatives from 1963 to 1966, representing Georgetown County, South Carolina. He was a lawyer.
