= Martin Galvin (poet) =

American poet

- Born: Martin George Galvin; February 21, 1937; Mount Airy, Philadelphia, U.S.
- Died: August 6, 2018 (aged 81); Chevy Chase, Maryland, U.S.
- Education: Villanova University; University of Maryland, College Park
- Occupations: Poet teacher
- Writing career
- Notable awards: Columbia Prize for poetry Poet Lore
- Website: www.martingalvin.com

Martin George Galvin (February 21, 1937 – August 6, 2018) was a prize-winning American poet and teacher. He taught at the Writer's Center in Bethesda, Maryland, St. Joseph's College in Emmitsburg, Maryland and Walt Whitman High School in Bethesda.

== Life ==
Galvin grew up in Mount Airy, Philadelphia, Pennsylvania. He attended Catholic schools including St. John's High School, Manayunk, Pennsylvania, from which he graduated in a class of 15. After graduating from Villanova University with a BA degree in Liberal Arts, he continued his education and received his Masters and his Ph.D. degrees in American Literature from the University of Maryland, College Park while teaching literature at St. Joseph's College, Emmitsburg, Maryland. After moving to the Washington, D.C. area in the early 1970s, he taught creative writing and poetry at Walt Whitman High School, Bethesda, Maryland. Before his death, he had most recently taught at the Writer's Center in Bethesda, Maryland.

== Family ==
He and his wife, Theresa, have two daughters, Brenna and Tara. They divided their time between Chevy Chase, Maryland and Ocean View, Delaware.

== Work ==
His poetry, fiction and essays have appeared in The Atlantic Monthly, Best American Poetry 1997, Beltway Poetry Quarterly, Delaware Poetry Review, Four Quarters, Midwest Quarterly, Orion, Poet Lore, Poetry, and Texas Review.

=== Selected works ===
==== Articles ====
- "PASSIVE AGGRESSIVE". Atlantic Monthly. August 1998.
- "THE TOAD IN THE GARDEN; SUMMER HOUSE; FISH, HERON, RIVER". Delaware Review. 2007.

==== Books ====
- 'A Way To Home: New and Selected Poems,' (Poets Choice Publishing, 2017) ISBN 978-0-9972629-2-6
- "Sounding the Atlantic," (Broadkill River Press, 2010) ISBN 978-09826030-1-7
- Circling Out. Finishing Line Press. 2007. ISBN 978-1-59924-145-6.
- Appetites (Bogg Publications, 2000). OP.
- Making Beds (Sedwick House, 1989). OP.
- Wild Card (Washington Writers Publishing House, 1989) ISBN 0-931846-34-X

==== Anthologies ====
- Hamill, Sam; Anderson, Sally, eds. (2003). "Army Burn Ward". Poets against the War. Thunder's Mouth Press. ISBN 978-1-56025-539-0.
- Tate, James; Lehman, David, eds. (1997). "Introductions". The Best American Poetry 1997. Simon and Schuster. ISBN 978-0-684-81452-0.
- "The Poet Upstairs", Washington Writers Publishing House, 1997;
- "70 on the 70's", Ashland College, 1981;
- "Anthology of Magazine Verse", Los Angeles, 1981, 1983, 1985;
- "Songs from Unsung Worlds", Boston, 1985;

== Awards ==
His book of poems, Wild Card, was the winner of the 1989 Columbia Prize for Poetry judged by Howard Nemerov. He was also the recipient of the 1992 Poet Lore Narrative Poetry Award.
