= David Parrott =

English cricketer

David Parrott (c.1933 – 25 August 2018) was an English cricketer. He was a right-handed batsman who played for Oxfordshire.

Parrott, who played for Oxfordshire in the Minor Counties Championship between 1963 and 1973, made a single List A appearance for the side, during the 1972 season, against Durham. From the upper-middle order, he scored a single run.

Parrott died in Perth, Australia, on 25 August 2018, aged 85.
