= Miguel Ángel Sanz Bocos =

Spanish aviator (1918–2018)

- Born: 5 July 1918; Arganda del Rey, Spain
- Died: 13 August 2018 (aged 100); Benidorm, Spain
- Military career
- Allegiance: Spanish Republican Army
- Conflicts: Spanish Civil War

Miguel Angel Sanz Bocos, also known as El Vallecas (5 July 1918 – 13 August 2018), was a Spanish aviator who was a member of the Spanish Republican Army during the Spanish Civil War.

Sanz Bocos was born in Arganda del Rey, Community of Madrid, on 5 July 1918, under the care of his father, Marcelo Sanz, who was part of a family of renowned ironmongers in Vallecas.

At the beginning of the Spanish Civil War in 1936, at the age of 18, Sanz Bocos enlisted in the Republican army, in the Antigas unit, starting at the front of Villanueva del Pardillo, to later be assigned to the Talavera front. He was part of a group sent to the pilot school in Kirovabad, Azerbaijan, where he was chosen to become pilot of the Polikarpov I-16.

After the war, in February 1940 Sanz Bocos was ordered to take land in Toulouse, along with his unit, heading to the French Pyrenees where agents and mobile guards from France waited for them. There they waited in unsatisfactory conditions, which caused in a short time that most of his unit began to die of dysentery, starvation and hypothermia; later they were transferred to the station of Oloron-Sainte-Marie, in the concentration camp of Gurs.

In 1981, he published his first book entitled Luchando en tierras de Francia: la participación de los españoles en la Resistencia (Fighting in the lands of France: the participation of the Spaniards in the Resistance) where he expressed his lived experiences. In the year 2000, he published his second book entitled Memorias de un chico de Vallecas: piloto de caza de la República (Memories of a boy from Vallecas: fighter pilot of the Republic).

On 13 August 2018, he died at 100 years of age in Benidorm, Province of Alicante.
