= Morris G. Hallock =

American politician

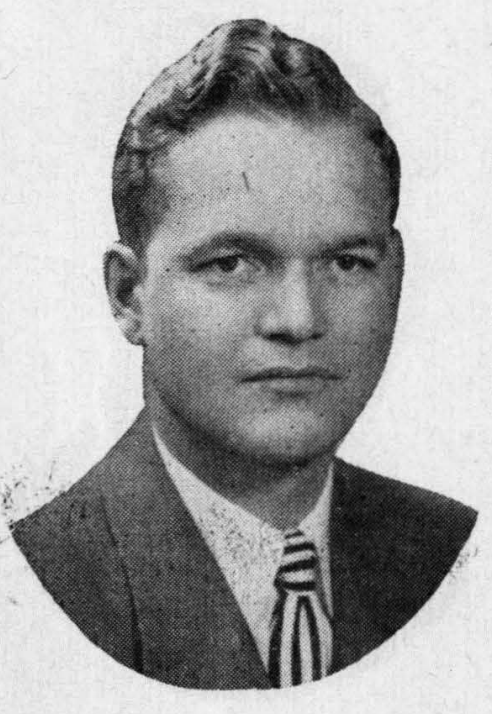

Member of the South Dakota House of Representatives from the 47th district
- In office 1953–1954
- In office 1967–1968

Personal details
- Born: February 17, 1926 Springview, Nebraska, U.S.
- Died: August 11, 2018 (aged 92)
- Party: Republican
- Profession: newspaper publisher

Morris G. Hallock (February 17, 1926 – August 11, 2018) was an American politician from the state of South Dakota. He was a member of the South Dakota House of Representatives briefly in the 1950s and 1960s. Hallock has a high school education and was a newspaper publisher. He also served in the United States Navy. In the 1950s, Hallock also served as Secretary of Finance in the South Dakota Government.
