= N. Frank Ukadike =

Scholar of African cinema and film history (1950–2018)

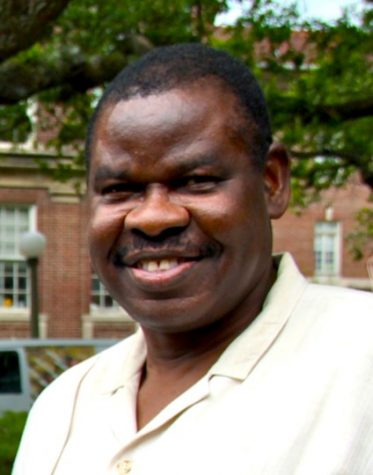

Nwachukwu Frank Ukadike (1950–2018) was a scholar of African cinema and film history, and a member of faculty at Tulane University.

== Life ==
Born in 1950, Ukadike gained a BA from Croydon College and a master's in film and telecommunications from the University of Oregon. At New York University he gained a master's in cinema studies in 1986 and a PhD in 1989. He joined the faculty of the University of Michigan before moving to Tulane University in 1998.

Ukadike died on August 4, 2018, in Agbor, Nigeria, while researching and visiting family.

== Works ==
- African Black Cinema, 1994
- (ed.) New discourses of African Cinema, 1995
- Questioning African Cinema: Conversations with African Filmmakers, 2002
- (ed.) African Cinema: Narratives, Perspectives and Poetics, 2014
- Critical Approaches to African Cinema Discourse, 2014
