= María José la Valenciana =

Spanish internet personality

- Born: 1974; Sagunto, Province of Valencia, Spain
- Died: August 2, 2018

María José la Valenciana (1974 – August 2, 2018) was a Spanish internet personality, mostly known for her account on Instagram.

== Life ==
Born in Sagunto, Province of Valencia, Spain and assigned male at birth, she was abandoned by her mother shortly after she was born and was raised with her grandparents. After their deaths, she was forced to practice prostitution to survive and face the expenses of the sex change operation, working mostly in "Parthenon", a night club in Torremolinos, Málaga. She was a roommate of the vedette and prostitute La Veneno. Her father, a fisherman in the port of Sagunto, tolerated her transsexuality, something unusual at that time. In 2016, Maria gained in popularity on Instagram as her co-worker began posting videos of her on the social media.

== Death ==
María José la Valenciana died on 2 August 2018 after relapsing into alcoholism shortly after finishing the detoxification process.
