= Carlo Della Corna =

Italian footballer and manager (died 2018)

Personal information
- Date of death: 26 August 2018 (aged 66)
- Height: 1.80 m (5 ft 11 in)
- Position: Goalkeeper

Senior career*
| Years | Team | Apps | (Gls) |
| 1971–1977 | Varese | 66 | (0) |
| 1971–1972 | → Chieti (loan) | 12 | (0) |
| 1977–1983 | Udinese | 118 | (0) |
| 1983–1984 | Perugia | 1 | (0) |
| 1984–1985 | Como | 0 | (0) |
- Pavia
| Total | | 197 | (0) |
- * Club domestic league appearances and goals

Carlo Della Corna (died 26 August 2018) was an Italian professional football player and manager.

== Career ==
Born in Monza, Della Corna played as a goalkeeper for Varese, Chieti, Udinese, Perugia, Como and Pavia.

After retiring as a player he worked as a manager and coach, primarily with youth players.
