= Antonio Pischedda =

Italian politician (died 2018)

Antonio Pischedda (died 20 August 2018) was an Italian politician who served as a Senator from 1992 to 1994.
