= William Van Wagoner =

American bicyclist and automobile designer

William H. Van Wagoner
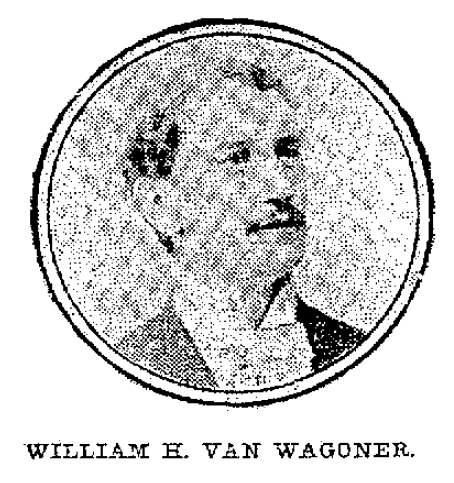
- Born: April 1870; New Jersey, United States
- Died: After 1920
- Occupations: Automobile designer, bicyclist
- Spouse(s): Blanche Viola Marshall, daughter of Alexander Marshall and Mary E. Studvvell

William H. Van Wagoner (April 1870 – after 1920) was born in New Jersey and was a bicycle racer from 1888 through the mid 1890s who won many competitions throughout the Northeastern United States. He went on to design the Van Wagoner, an American electric automobile manufactured between 1899 and 1903 in Syracuse, New York, by the Syracuse Automobile Company.
