= Yves-Marie-Henri Bescond =

French Roman Catholic prelate (1924–2018)

His Excellency Yves-Marie-Henri Bescond
- Titular bishop of Aquae Thibilitanae
- Church: Roman Catholic Church
- See: Titular See of Aquae Thibilitanae
- In office: 1971–2018
- Predecessor: Charles-Marie-Jacques Guilhem
- Successor: Current
- Previous post: Prelate

Orders
- Ordination: 29 June 1949

Personal details
- Born: 19 May 1924 Clamart, France
- Died: 23 August 2018 (aged 94) Paris, France

Yves-Marie-Henri Bescond (19 May 1924 – 23 August 2018) was a French prelate of the Catholic Church.

Bescond was born in Clamart and ordained a priest on 29 June 1949. Bescond was appointed auxiliary bishop to the Diocese of Corbeil, as well as Titular bishop of Aquae Thibilitanae, on 26 January 1971 and ordained bishop on 28 March 1971. Bescond was appointed auxiliary bishop to the Diocese of Meaux on 12 July 1979 and resigned on 20 October 1986. He died on 23 August 2018.
