= Richard W. Waggener =

American politician

Member of the Wyoming House of Representatives
- In office 1985–1986

Personal details
- Born: January 24, 1930 Green River, Wyoming, U.S.
- Died: August 30, 2018 (aged 88)
- Party: Republican
- Education: University of Wyoming

Richard W. Waggener (January 24, 1930 – August 30, 2018) was an American politician. He served as a Republican member of the Wyoming House of Representatives.

== Life and career ==
Waggener was born in Green River, Wyoming. He attended the University of Wyoming.

Waggener served in the Wyoming House of Representatives from 1985 to 1986.

Waggener died on August 30, 2018, at the age of 88.
