= Adrienne Lash Jones =

American Black studies scholar (1935-2018)

- Born: Adrienne Lash; July 15, 1935; Salisbury, North Carolina, U.S.
- Died: August 28, 2018 (aged 83); Cary, North Carolina

Academic work
- Discipline: Black studies
- Institutions: Oberlin College

Adrienne Lash Jones (July 15, 1935 - August 28, 2018) was an American academic of African-American studies. She was a professor at Oberlin College for most of her career.

== Early life and education ==
Adrienne Lash was born in Salisbury, North Carolina to Wiley I. Lash and Thelma Spalding Lash. Her family had a history of operating small businesses and valued education; her mother had earned a PhD. One of two daughters, she grew up in Salisbury, where she worked in the family-owned Lash’s Self Service Grocery and attended Price High School. Lash's father went on to become Salisbury's first Black mayor from 1981 to 1985.

Jones graduated from Fisk University in 1956 with a bachelor's degree in business management. While at Fisk, she joined Alpha Kappa Alpha. She earned a graduate degree (1979) and a doctorate in American studies (1983) at Case Western Reserve University. Her dissertation was titled Jane Edna Hunter: A Case Study of Black Leadership, 1915- 1950. It was republished in 1990 in volume 12 of the 16- volume series, Black Women in United States History (Carlson Publishing, Inc.).

== Career ==
Jones became involved in civil rights activism in Cleveland in the 1960s, eventually becoming recognized as a local leader, meeting with figures such as Malcolm X and Cleveland mayor Carl Stokes.

Much of Jones' academic publishing was on Black women in the YWCA, exploring the history of inclusion, segregation, and racism within the organization. In 1987, she received a grant from the National Endowment for the Humanities for her research into the history of Black women in the YWCA.

Jones was a professor at Oberlin College for most of her career, and became the school's first tenured female Black professor. She was head of Oberlin College's Black Studies Department by 1991, and developed a curriculum for the department which focused on "a mix of courses in history, politics, education, and fine arts". She also played a pivotal role in the development of the college's feminist studies department.

== Personal life and death ==
She married L. Morris Jones (d. 2015) in 1957. The couple moved to Cleveland in 1958, and L. Morris Jones started a medical practice in the Hough neighborhood. In 1962, they relocated to Shaker Heights as part of integration efforts.

The couple had three sons, two of whom were twins. The couple retired in the late 1990s, relocating to Myrtle Beach, South Carolina. Following Morris's death in 2015, Jones relocated to Cary, North Carolina to live near her sister.

Adrienne Lash Jones died in Cary, North Carolina on August 28, 2018.

== Publications ==
=== Articles ===
- Jane Edna Hunter: A Case Study of Black Leadership, 1915- 1950.
  - Republished in Black Women in United States History. Vol. 12. Carlson Publishing. 1990.
- Jones, Adrienne Lash (1991-04-12). Struggle among Saints: Black Women in the YWCA, 1860-1920 (Report). Oberlin College Department of Black Studies.
  - Republished in Mjagkij, Nina; Spratt, Margaret, eds. (1997). Men and Women Adrift: The YMCA and the YWCA in the City. New York University Press. ISBN 978-0-8147-5541-9.
- Jones, Adrienne Lash (February 2000). "Bowles, Eva Del Vakia (24 January 1875–14 June 1943), secretary for colored work for the Young Women's Christian Association". American National Biography. doi:10.1093/anb/9780198606697.article.1500081.
- Jones, Adrienne Lash (2005-05-19). "Young Women's Christian Association". Oxford African American Studies Center. doi:10.1093/acref/9780195301731.013.44496. ISBN 978-0-19-530173-1.

=== Chapters ===
- Jones, Adrienne Lash. "Addie Waits Hunton". In Sklar, Kathryn Kish; Dublin, Thomas (eds.). Black Women Suffragists. Women and Social Movements Database. Alexander Street Press.
- Jones, Adrienne Lash (1993). "Phyllis (Phillis) Wheatley Clubs and Homes". In Hine, Darlene Clark (ed.). Black Women in America: A Historic Encyclopedia. New York City: Carson Publishing.
- Jones, Adrienne Lash (1996-11-22). "Philanthropy in the African American Experience". In Schneewind, Jerome B. (ed.). Giving: Western Ideas of Philanthropy. Indiana University Press. ISBN 978-0-253-11333-7.
