= Stefano Vetrano =

Italian politician (1923–2018)

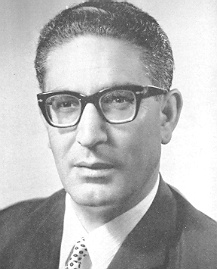
Stefano Vetrano

Stefano Vetrano (25 March 1923 – 1 August 2018) was an Italian politician who served as a Deputy representing the Italian Communist Party from 1968 to 1975, and held a degree in industrial chemistry. He died at the age of 95 in Baiano, Province of Avellino, on 1 August 2018.

== Biography ==
An active member of the CGIL trade union, he served as general secretary of the List of trade unions in Italy from 1956 to 1968.

He served as mayor of his hometown. A member of the Italian Communist Party (PCI), he was elected to the Chamber of Deputies in 1968 for the 5th legislature and was re-elected in 1972 for the Legislature VI of Italy; his term in Parliament ended in 1976.

He was married to Annamaria and had two children.
