= Peter Berck =

American economist

Peter Berck (April 26, 1950 – August 10, 2018) was an American economist.

Berck studied mathematics and economics at the University of California, Berkeley, and completed a doctorate in economics from the Massachusetts Institute of Technology in 1976. Berck returned to Berkeley as a faculty member and was named the S.J. Hall Professor of Forest Economics.

== Background ==
Berck grew up in New York, attended UC Berkeley, and earned a PhD in economics from MIT. Returning to Berkeley, he spent his academic career of nearly 42 years in UC Berkeley's Department of Agricultural & Resource Economics, College of Natural Resources.

Berck was an environmental economist focusing on farming, forests, fisheries, pollution, and energy.
