= William H. Faucher =

American politician (1938–2018)

Member of the New Hampshire House of Representatives from the Cheshire 3rd district
- In office 1976–1978

Personal details
- Born: February 13, 1938 Webster, Massachusetts, U.S.
- Died: August 6, 2018 (aged 80)
- Party: Democratic

William H. Faucher (February 13, 1938 – August 6, 2018) was an American politician. He served as a member for the Cheshire 3rd district of the New Hampshire House of Representatives.

== Life and career ==
Faucher was born in Webster, Massachusetts. He attended Notre Dame Parochial School.

Faucher served in the New Hampshire House of Representatives from 1976 to 1978.

Faucher died on August 6, 2018, at the age of 80.
