= C. David Gutsche =

American chemist (1921–2018)

Carl David Gutsche (March 21, 1921 – August 28, 2018) was an American chemist.

Gutsche was raised in La Grange Park, Illinois. He studied at Oberlin College and later earned a doctorate in organic chemistry from the University of Wisconsin. Gutsche taught at Washington University in St. Louis from 1947 to 1989 earning the rank of professor emeritus. From 1989 to 2002, he was appointed Robert A. Welch Professor of Chemistry at Texas Christian University. Upon retirement in 2002, Gutsche moved to Tucson, Arizona and became a visiting scholar at the University of Arizona.
