= Fieger =

Fieger is a surname. Notable people with the surname include:

- Carl Fieger (1893–1960), German architect, designer, and teacher
- Doug Fieger (1952–2010), American singer–songwriter and musician
- Geoffrey Fieger (born 1950), American attorney

== See also ==
- Fiegert
- Rieger
