= Rieger =

Rieger is a surname. Notable people with the surname include:

- August Rieger, Austrian screenwriter and director
- Bernhard Rieger, German Prelate of the Roman Catholic Church
- Durhane Wong-Rieger, Canadian physician
- Eric Rieger, American artist
- Erich Rieger, German astrophysicist
- Eva Rieger, German musicologist
- František Ladislav Rieger, Czech politician and leader of nationalist movement
- Franz Rieger (1895–1965), German painter
- Franz Rieger (writer) (1923–2005), Austrian writer
- Fritz Rieger, German conductor
- Gottfried Rieger (1764–1855), Austrian composer
- Heinrich Rieger, Austrian dentist and art collector
- James E. Rieger, American lawyer and US Army officer
- Janusz Rieger, Polish linguist
- Joerg Rieger (born 1963), American professor
- Joy Rieger, Israeli actress
- Jürgen Rieger, German lawyer and Holocaust denier
- Ladislav Svante Rieger, Czech mathematician
- Lukas Rieger (born 1999), German singer
- Marc Oliver Rieger, German mathematician
- Max Rieger (skier) (born 1946), German alpine skier
- Max Rieger (musician) (born 1993), German singer-songwriter, musician and producer
- Nicole Rieger, German pole-vaulter
- Paul Rieger, New Zealand politician
- Reinhard Rieger, Austrian zoologist
- Renate Wagner-Rieger, Austrian art historian
- Sabine Günther née Rieger, East German athlete
- Silvia Rieger, German athlete
- Wendy Rieger, American journalist and actress
- William Rieger, American politician

== See also ==
- De Reiger, Nijetrijne, a smock mill in Nijetrijne, Friesland, Netherlands
- De Dans van de Reiger, a 1966 Dutch film
- Rieger Orgelbau, Austrian organ-building firm
- Rieger–Kloss, Czech organ-building firm
- Rieger Tuning, automobile tuning specialist and bodykit manufacturer
