= Kurt Weill Centre =

Cultural site in Dessau, Saxony-Anhalt, Germany

- Kurt-Weill-Zentrum
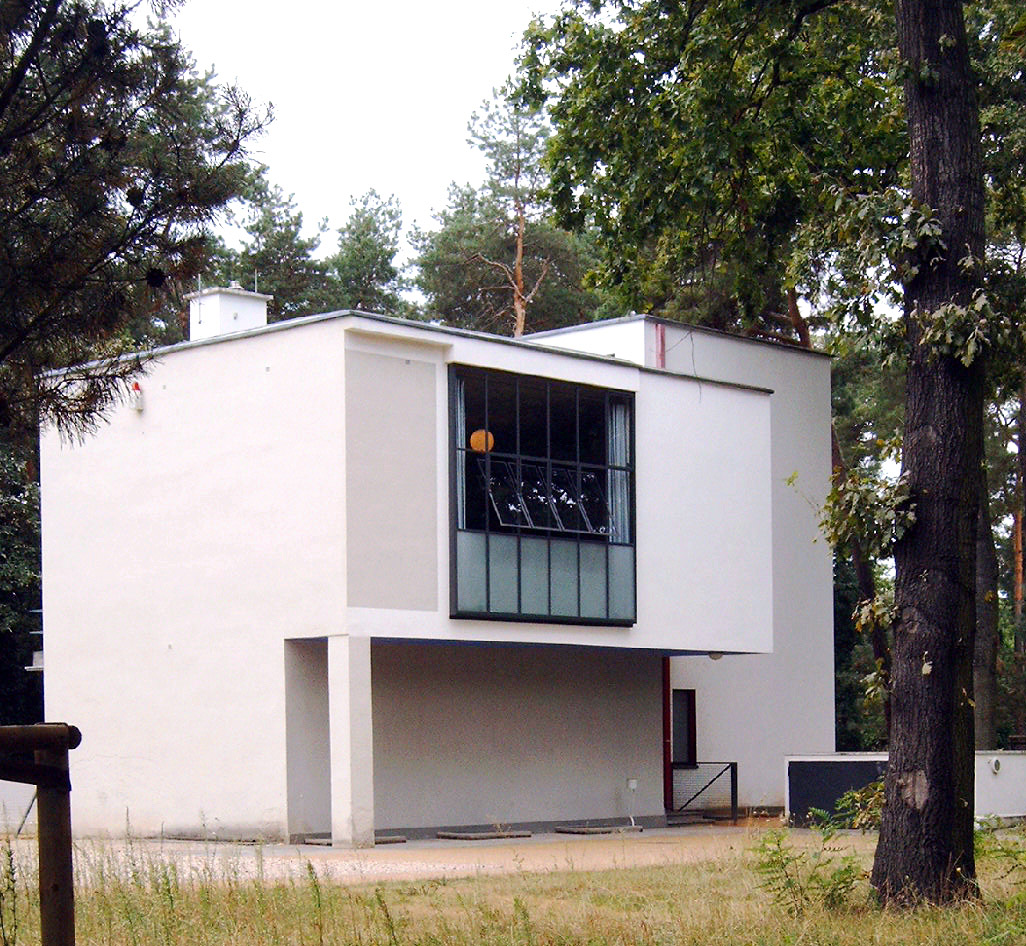
- Meisterhaus Feininger
- Interactive map of Kurt Weill Centre

General information
- Architectural style: Modernism
- Location: Ebertallee 63; 06846 Dessau, Germany
- Coordinates: 51°50′35″N 12°13′19″E

The Kurt Weill Centre is a cultural site in Dessau, in Saxony-Anhalt, Germany. It is a museum and information centre about the life and work of the composer Kurt Weill (1900–1950), who was born in Dessau.

== History ==
The museum is in the Meisterhaus Feininger, built in 1925–26. It was one of the houses designed by Walter Gropius as accommodation for the masters of the Bauhaus; the artist Lyonel Feininger lived here from 1926 to 1932. (Apart from its location in Dessau, it has no direct connection with the life of the composer.) The building is included in the Blaubuch (Blue Book) of the Federal Government, as an important cultural site.

In the 1990s the Kurt Weill Foundation for Music, in New York, and the cultural office of Dessau, founded the Kurt Weill Festival, an annual festival in Dessau about the composer. The Kurt Weill Centre was opened as the European centre for the composer's work, and a base for organizing the festival. It was accommodated initially in the nearby Meisterhaus Schlemmer in 1993, and relocated in the present building in December 1994 when renovation was complete.

== Exhibition and library ==
There is a permanent exhibition about the composer; a special exhibition is shown at the time of the Kurt Weill Festival.

The library, open to interested visitors on request, contains sheet music, mainly by Kurt Weill, literature relating to classic modernism, CDs and DVDs.
