= Fiegert =

Fiegert (German pronunciation: [ˈfiːgərt]) is a German surname. Notable people with the surname include:

- Anna Fiegert (born 1994), German ice hockey player
- Elfie Fiegert (born 1946), German actor
- Nigel Fiegert (born 1976), Australian Australian rules football player
