= Reinhard Rieger =

Austrian zoologist (1943–2006)

Reinhard M. Rieger (10 May 1943 – 11 October 2006) was an Austrian zoologist.

== Life ==
Reinhard Rieger was born in Linz, and raised in Hartberg. His parents were high school teachers. He studied zoology and botany at the University of Vienna, where his doctoral thesis was supervised by Rupert Riedl. After his studies he followed Riedl to the University of North Carolina at Chapel Hill in the United States, and was himself eventually appointed a professor of zoology and marine sciences there in 1981. In 1985 he returned to Austria to take up a professorship in zoology at the University of Innsbruck.

Rieger's research focused on the morphology, developmental biology, and evolution of basal animal groups, especially the platyhelminths. His research group worked on the stem cells of turbellarians.

He coauthored, with Wilfried Westheide, the standard German-language zoological reference work Spezielle Zoologie. The Reinhard-Rieger-Award in Zoomorphology, initiated in 2008, was established in his memory.

Rieger was married to Gunde Reinwald, who also studied zoology at the University of Vienna, and who gave up her own career to support his work. Rieger died on 11 October 2006 in Birgitz, Tirol.

== Selected works ==
- Spezielle Zoologie. 2nd ed. Elsevier, Spektrum Akademischer Verlag, München 2007 (2 vols., coauthored with Wilfried Westheide).
- Einzeller und Wirbellose Tiere, 2007. ISBN 978-3-8274-1575-2
- Wirbel- oder Schädeltiere, 2010. ISBN 978-3-8274-2039-8.
