= Eric Rieger =

American artist

HOTTEA
- Born: Eric Rieger
- Style: Graffiti

Eric Rieger, also known as HOTTEA, is a Minneapolis, Minnesota based artist. Rieger uses brightly colored yarn to design words and images on fences around Minneapolis. Originally a graffiti painter, Reiger switched to "yarn bombing" after spending time in jail for using paint. Instead of continuing on with graffiti art, Reiger studied for and received a degree in graphic design at the Minneapolis College of Art and Design (MCAD). He graduated in 2007 and became a freelance artist.

== History ==
Rieger's change in his street art began with him weaving the word HOTTEA onto a chained fence. HOTTEA seemed to stick and soon became his street name. HOTTEA includes family influences throughout all of his work. When Rieger's grandmother died in 2007, Rieger began to use the knitting she had taught him to create works of art throughout the Minneapolis area.

The word HOTTEA was seen all over Minneapolis. HOTTEA began to create images, such as one image of his grandmother, created by connecting yarn to nails, which created the image.

While HOTTEA's art was being discussed online, he started to focus on hanging yarn from canopies over walkways on freeways in the Twin Cities.

HOTTEA continued installing pieces throughout the Twin Cities and eventually started to install pieces of his work in local businesses, such as the HAUS Salon and he has a piece at the Minneapolis Institute of Art (MIA).

In 2013, Rieger was named Best Street Artist in Minneapolis.

Even though HOTTEA is exhibiting his work indoors, he is still creating public art out on the streets. In 2013 he had outdoor installations in London, Berlin, New York and Los Angeles.
