= Blaubuch =

The Blaubuch ('Blue Book') is an inventory of "cultural lighthouses": culturally important sites in the eastern Länder of Germany.

It was first published in 2001, as an evaluation study proposed by the then Secretary of Culture of the German Federal Republic, Michael Naumann, and written by the librarian Paul Raabe; further editions have since been published. It lists sites of European standing in the eastern Länder – museums of national cultural heritage, and sites associated with important German personalities – and it documents the particular efforts of the federal, state and local governments to restore the cultural infrastructure.
