= Carl Fieger =

German architect

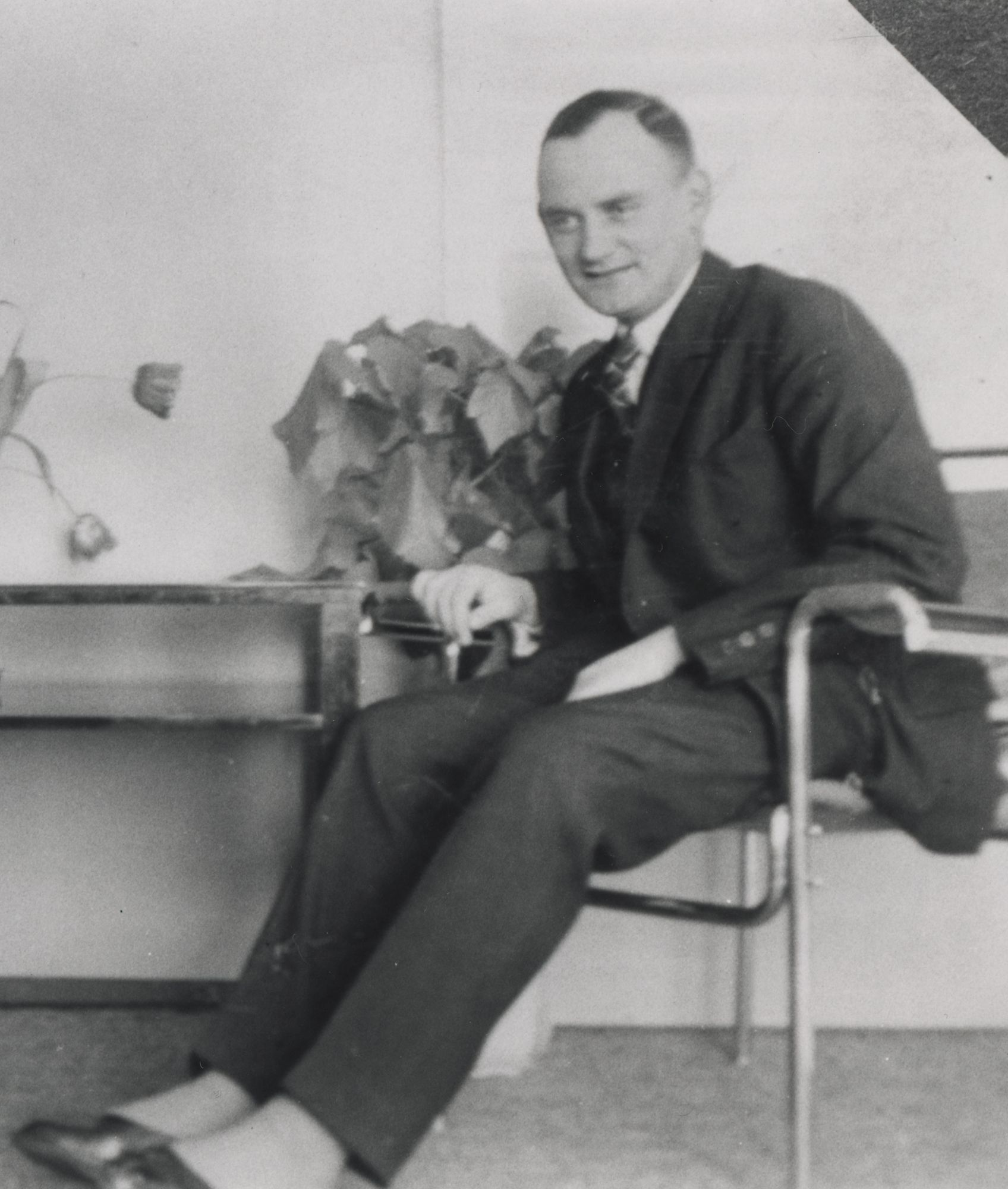
- Portrait of Carl Fieger (circa 1935)
- Born: 15 June 1893; Mainz, German Empire
- Died: 21 November 1960 (aged 67); Dessau, East Germany
- Education: Kunst und Baugewerkschule Mainz

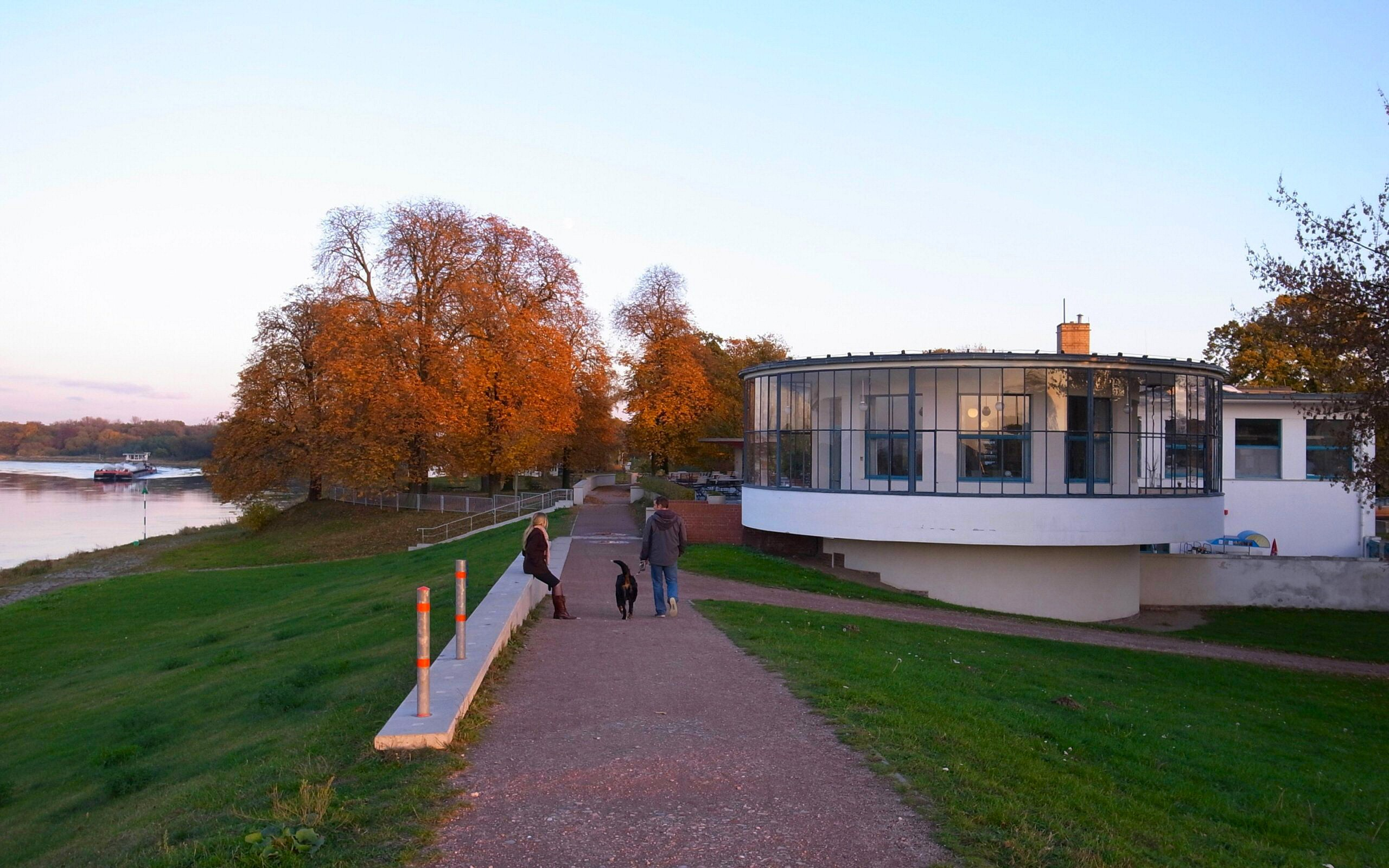
Kornhaus Restaurant in Dessau designed by Fieger in 1929

Carl Fieger (1893–1960) was a German architect, designer, and teacher at the Bauhaus.

== Life ==
=== Early life ===
Carl Fieger was born in Mainz, German Empire on 15 June 1893. Beginning in 1908, Fieger studied at the Mainz Art and Vocational School (German: Kunst und Baugewerkschule Mainz). After completing his studies in 1911, he worked at the studio of Peter Behrens where he became acquainted with Le Corbusier and Walter Gropius. In 1912, Fieger began working for Walter Gropius, with whom he would collaborate until 1934. Among the designs Fieger was involved with at Gropius' studio were the Fagus Factory (1922) and Bauhaus Building (1925).

In 1921, Gropius appointed Fieger as a teacher of architectural drawing at the Bauhaus, Weimar.

In 1929, Fieger submitted his design for an architectural contest by the city of Dessau and the Schultheiss-Patzenhofer for a restaurant located on the Elbe River in Dessau. His design was selected and the restaurant, the Kornhaus, was completed in 1930.

In 1934, Fieger was blacklisted by the Nazi Party, though he continued to produce architectural work anonymously.

==== Das Kornhaus ====
Carl Fieger had been working with Bauhaus founder Walter Gropius since 1921 and followed him to Dessau. In March 1929, the city of Dessau and the Schultheiss-Patzenhofer brewery announced a competition to design a restaurant on the Elbe. Although Fieger did not originally win the competition, his design was eventually selected likely due to economic reasons. The name comes from an 18th century granary which once stood at the site ("Kornhaus" means granary in German) and there was also a restaurant called "Kornhaus" which once occupied the site, utilizing the old granary structures. The original granary was built in 1781 under Leopold I of Anhalt Dessau and stood five stories and was demolished in the early 1800s. The granary and original restaurant were demolished so new construction plans could begin.

The Kornhaus is notable for being the only Bauhaus building constructed along a waterfront. It was intentionally built to resemble the steamships which would have been a common sight on the Elbe especially since it was located near a steamship pier. The restaurant is two-stories with the first floor holding a beer hall and the second floor featuring the kitchen, restaurant seating, a dance hall, a stage, and a large terrace which faces the river. The dance hall and seating flank the central kitchen. One of the most recognizable elements of the Kornhaus is the semi-circular room encased in glass which gives visitors a good view of the Elbe. The large windows are a notable aspect of Bauhaus design and the curves are sculptural curves of the design are also a signature element of Fieger's designs. This room was originally designed as an open balcony before it was later decided to enclose it in glass. The white color of the buildings with the blue and red accents are meant to invoke a maritime feeling.

During World War II the restaurant was used as a temporary hospital. Starting in the 1950s, and throughout the GDR period, it was run by the Handelsorganisation and was renovated on different occasions until 1996 when it was renovated with the purpose of protecting its historical significance. It reopened again in 2012 and being run by Kornhaus Betreiber GmbH with cooperation from the city of Dessau. The renovations in 2012 worked to restore the interior of the building to how it was originally when it opened and according to Fieger's plans. It remains open as a restaurant today.

=== Postwar ===
Following World War II Fieger participated in the rebuilding of Dessau and was involved in Hubert Hoffmann's efforts to reopen the Bauhaus.

In 1952, he began working as a research fellow at Deutsche Bauakademie in East Berlin.

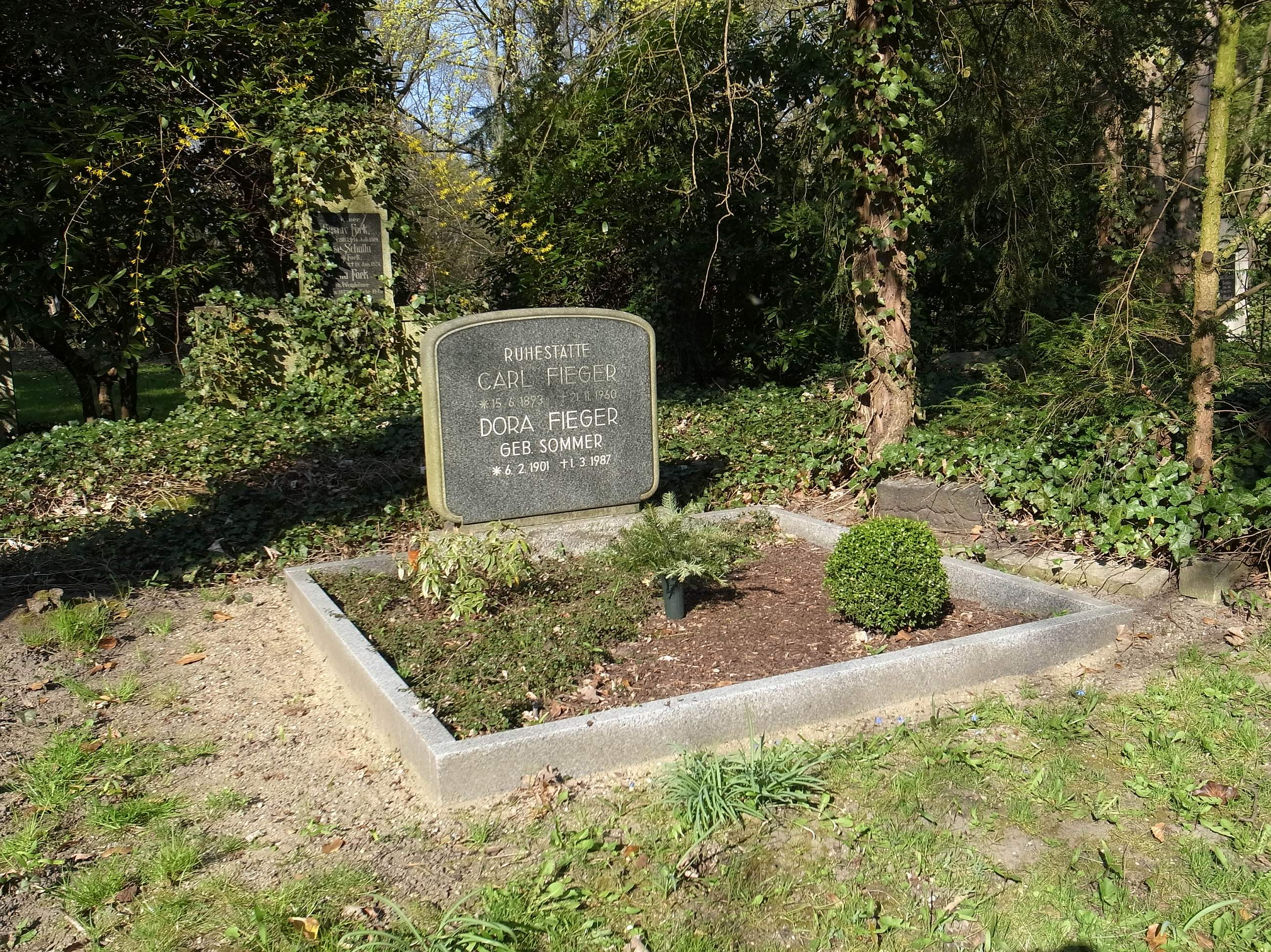
Grave at the III. Städtischer Friedhof Stubenrauchstraße in Dessau

Carl Fieger died on 21 November 1960 in Dessau, East Germany at age 67.

== Gallery ==
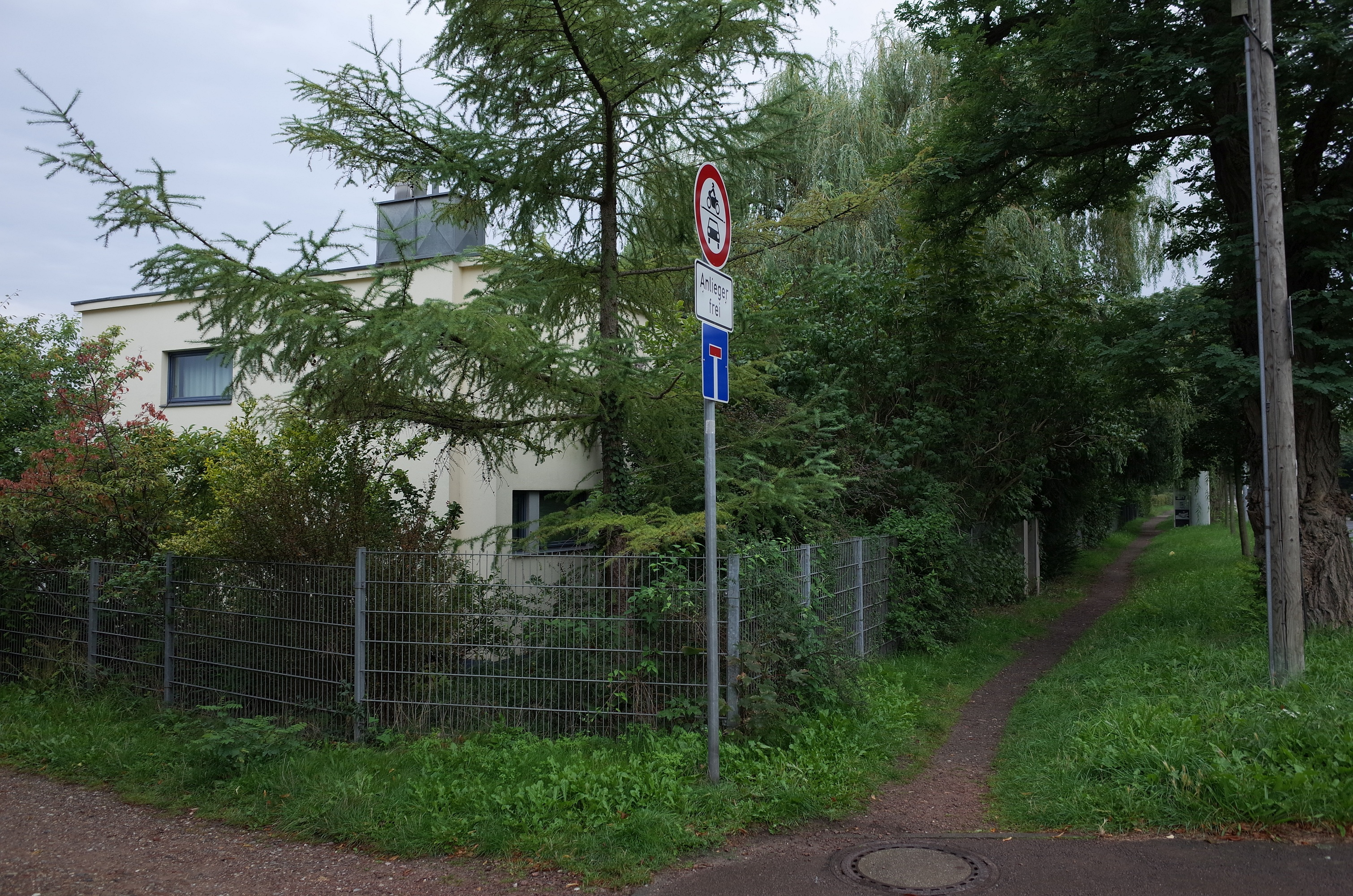
Haus Fieger in Dessau (1926)

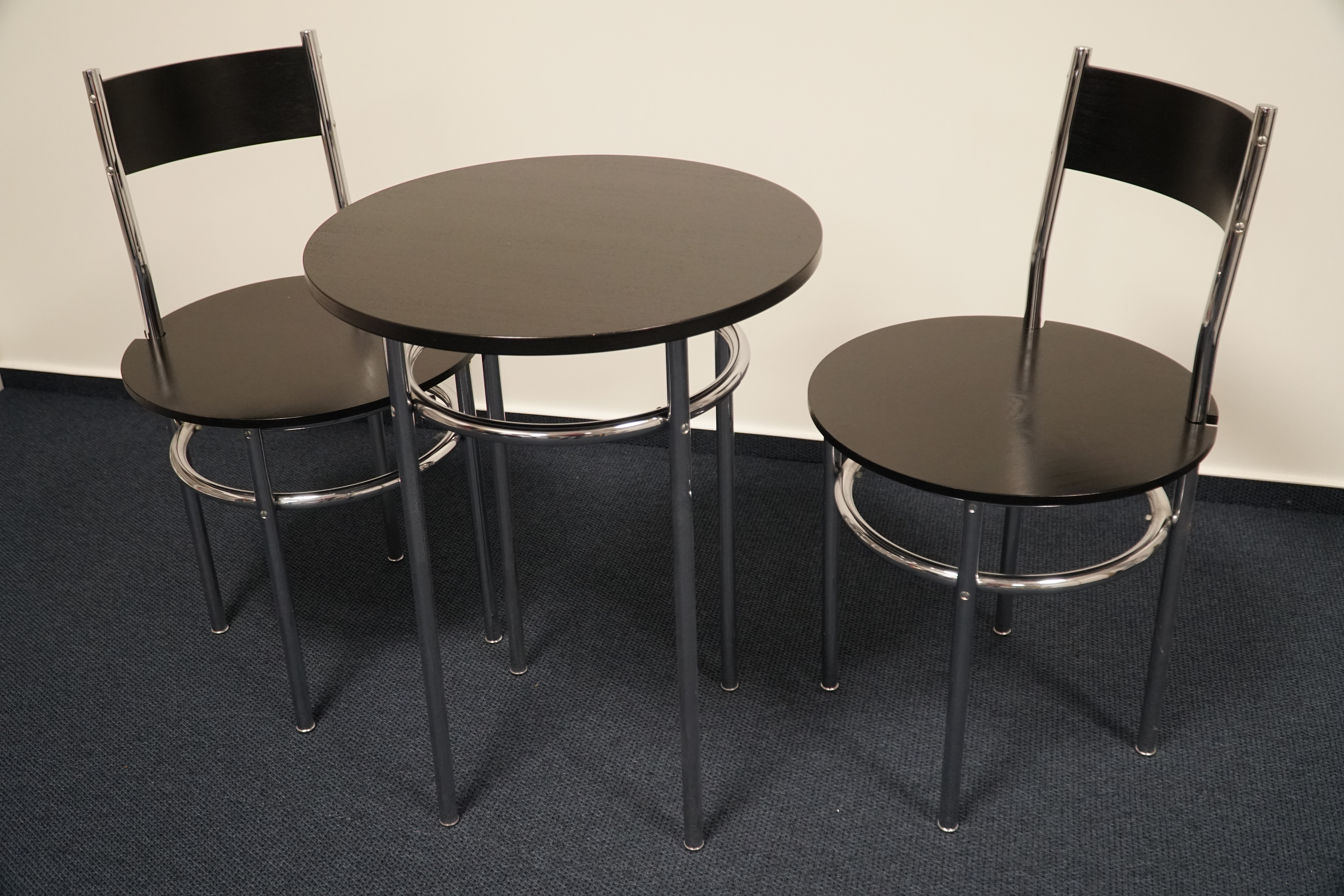
Fieger Chair and Table (1928)

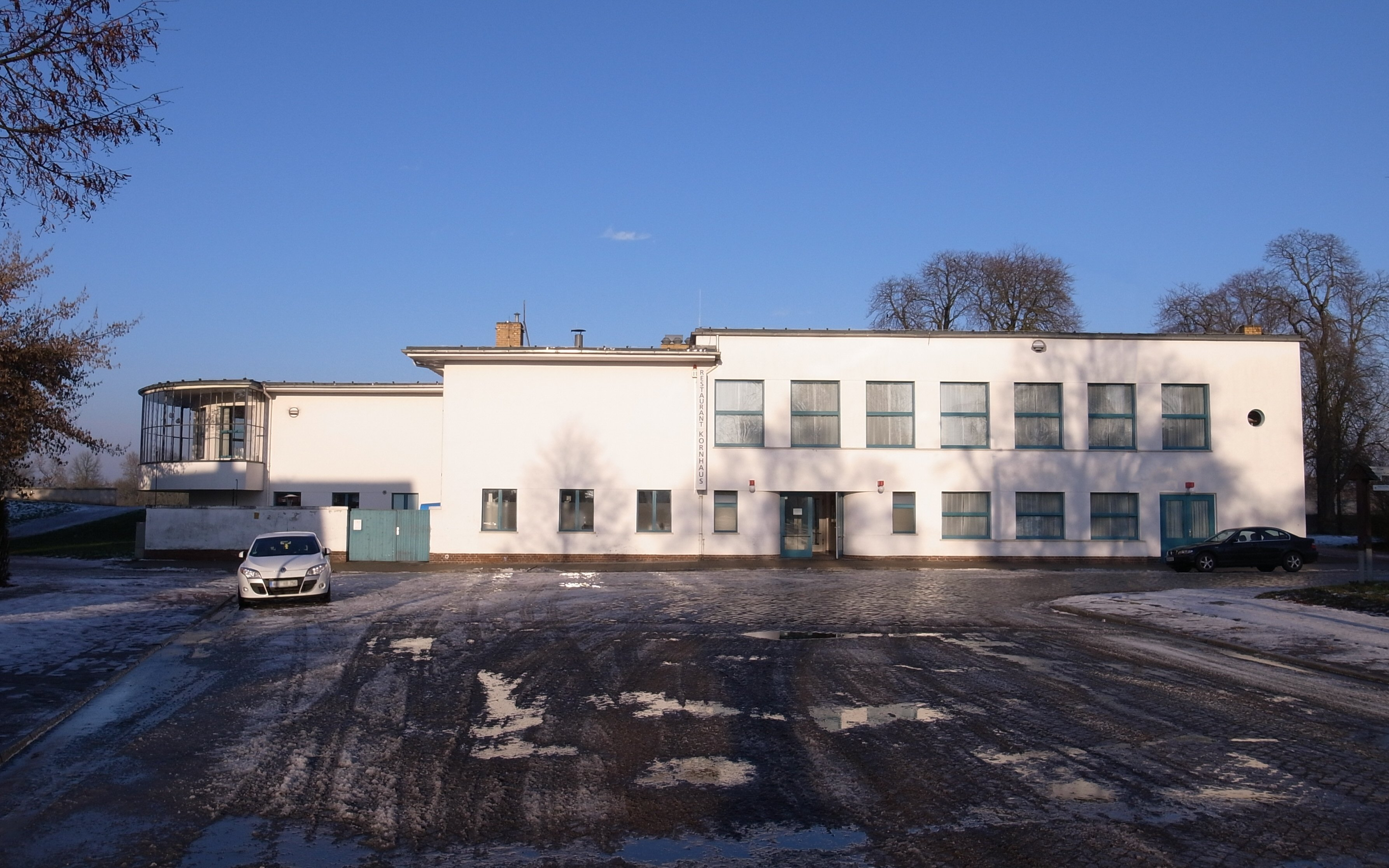
Kornhaus, Dessau (1929)

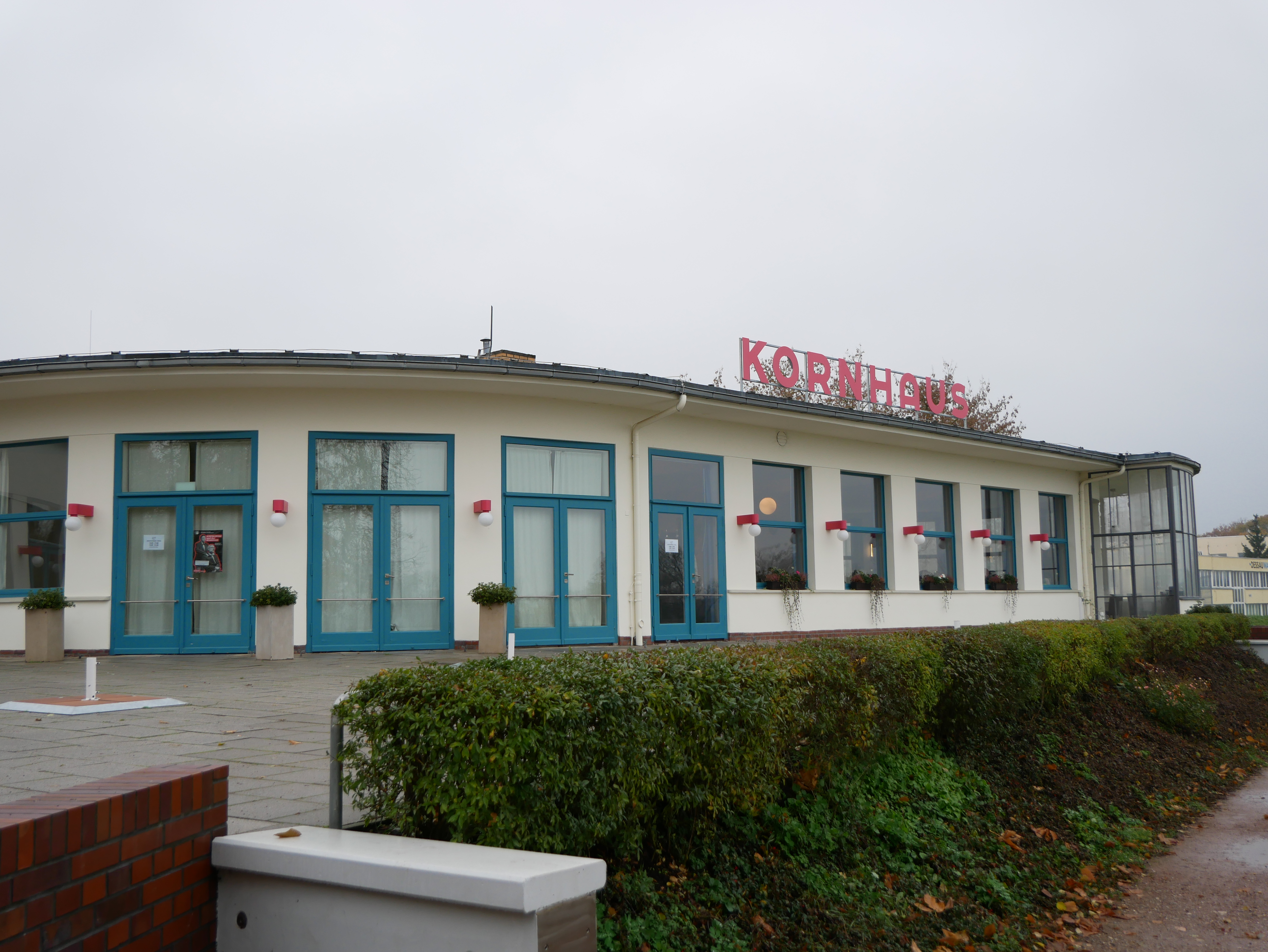
The front of the Kornhaus

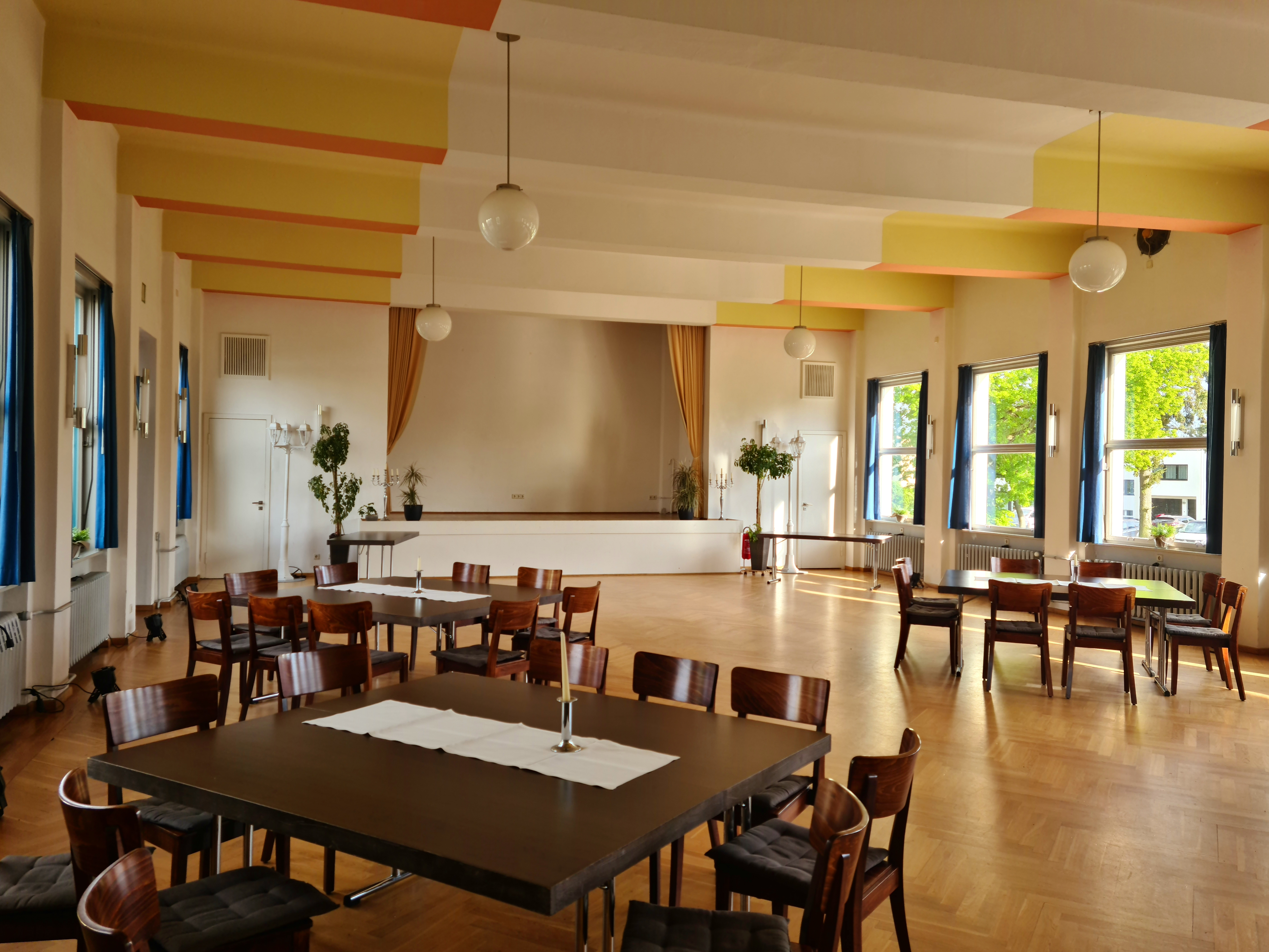
Inside the Kornhaus
