= Wagner (surname) =

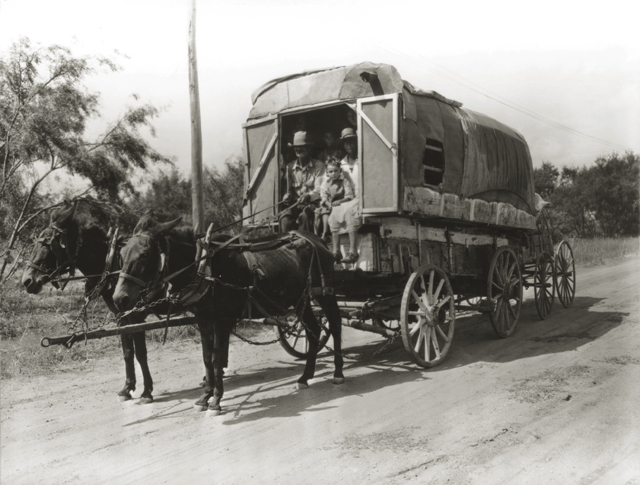
- Pronunciation: German name: /ˈvɑːɡnər/ VAHG-nər, German: [ˈvaːɡnɐ]; English name: /ˈwæɡnər/ WAG-nər
- Language: German

Origin
- Meaning: A maker or driver of wagons
- Region of origin: Germany

Other names
- Variant forms: Carter; Cartwright; Vagner; Wagoner; Wainwright; Wayne

The surname Wagner is derived from the Germanic surname Waganari, meaning 'wagonmaker' or 'wagon driver.' The surname is German but is also well-established in Scandinavia, the Netherlands, eastern Europe, and elsewhere as well as in all German-speaking countries, and among Ashkenazi Jews.

The Wagner surname was first found in Saxony, where the family became a prominent contributor to the development of the area from ancient times. The alternatively spelled surname Wegner has its origin in Silesia.

This common occupational surname was often given to one who transported produce or other goods via high-sided wagons or carts. Among some German populations, especially the Pennsylvania Germans, Wagner also denoted a wagon-maker, wainwright, or cartwright.

== People with the surname Wagner ==
- Aamil Wagner (born 2003), American football player
- Adolph Wagner (1835–1917), German economist
- Agnieszka Wagner (born 1970), Polish actress
- Alan Wagner (1931–2007), American television executive, radio personality, writer, opera historian and critic
- Alan Wagner (golfer) (born 1989), Argentine professional golfer
- Alex Wagner (born 1977), American television host, liberal journalist and author
- Allan Wagner (disambiguation)
- Amber Wagner (born 1980), American soprano
- Andreas Wagner (disambiguation)
- Anna Wagner (1914–2026), Austrian supercentenarian
- Ann Wagner (born 1962), American politician, U.S. Representative from Missouri
- Annett Wagner-Michel (born 1955), German chess master
- Anthony Wagner (1908–1995), British Garter Principal King of Arms
- Wagner (footballer, born 1966) (born Antonio Wagner de Moraes in 1966), Brazilian football forward
- Arthur Wagner (1824–1902), English clergyman from Brighton
- Ashley Wagner (born 1991), American figure skater
- Audrey Wagner (1927–1984), American baseball player (1943–1949), obstetrician and gynecologist
- Austin Wagner (born 1997), Canadian professional ice hockey player playing for United States teams
- Ben Wagner (born 1980), American radio sportscaster
- Billy Wagner (born 1971), American Major League Baseball player
- Blake Wagner (born 1988), American soccer coach
- Bobby Wagner (born 1990), American NFL football player
- Boyd Wagner (1916–1942), an American aviator and the first United States Army Air Forces (USAAF) fighter ace of World War II.
- Bruce Wagner (born 1954), American novelist and screenwriter
- Carl-Ludwig Wagner (1930–2012), German politician
- Carolin Wagner (born 1982), German politician
- Charles Wagner (1852–1919), French pastor and author who was invited to preach at the White House
- Chris Wagner (born 1991), American National Hockey League player
- Christean Wagner (1943–2025), German politician
- Chuck Wagner (born 1958), American actor, director, musical theater historian and teacher
- Cosima Wagner (1837–1930), director of the Bayreuth Festival, daughter of Liszt and widow of Richard Wagner
- Dajuan Wagner (disambiguation)
- Dalton Wagner (born 1998), American football player
- Daniela Wagner (born 1957), German politician
- Daniel Wagner, several people
- David Wagner (disambiguation), several people
- Denisa D. Wagner, American biologist and professor of pediatrics at Boston Children's Hospital, Harvard Medical School
- Dennis Wagner (disambiguation), several people
- Dietrich Wagner (1945–2023), German engineer
- Dinara Wagner (born 1999), German chess woman grandmaster
- Donald P. Wagner (born 1960), American politician
- Dr. Wagner (disambiguation), multiple people
- Eberhard Wagner (born 1938), German academic, linguist and author
- Eduard Wagner (1894–1944), quartermaster-general of the German Army in World War II
- Eric Wagner (1959–2021), American heavy metal vocalist
- Florence Wagner (disambiguation)
- Floyd E. Wagner (1898–1983), American politician
- Franz Wagner (disambiguation)
- Friedelind Wagner (1918–1991), German writer and broadcaster, daughter of Siegfried and Winifred Wagner
- Fridolin Wagner (born 1997), German footballer
- Gabriel Wagner (c. 1660 – c. 1717), a radical German philosopher
- Gary Wagner, multiple people
- George Wagner, several people
- Gerhard Wagner, multiple people
- Gillian Wagner (1927–2025), British writer and social administrator
- Gottfried Wagner (born 1947) writer and critic of the Wagner family, son of Wolfgang Wagner
- Gudrun Wagner (1944–2007), second wife of Wolfgang Wagner
- Günter P. Wagner (born 1954), Austrian biologist
- Guillermo Wagner (disambiguation)
- Gustav Wagner (disambiguation), several people
- Hans Wagner, multiple people
- Harvey M. Wagner (1931–2017), American management scientist and professor
- Haylie Wagner (born 1993), American softball player in the National Pro Fastpitch league
- Heinrich Wagner (disambiguation)
- Henry Wagner, multiple people
- Ina Wagner (born 1946), Austrian scientist and university professor
- Jack Wagner, multiple people
- James Wagner, multiple people
- Jane Wagner (born 1935), American writer, director and producer
- Jaques Wagner (born 1951), Brazilian federal government's Minister of Defence
- Jasmin Wagner (born 1980), stage name Blümchen, German singer, actress, model and spokeswoman
- Jenny Wagner (disambiguation)
- Jens-Christian Wagner (born 1966), German historian
- Jill Wagner (born 1979), American actress
- Johann Wagner (disambiguation), multiple people
- Johannes Wagner, multiple people
- John Wagner (born 1949), American-born British comics writer
- Josef Wagner (disambiguation), several people
- Kai Wagner (born 1997), German footballer
- Karl Wagner, multiple people
- Katharina Wagner (born 1949), German opera director, daughter of Wolfgang and Gudrun Wagner
- Katie Wagner (born 1964), American television personality and Hollywood reporter
- Klaus Wagner (1910–2000), German mathematician
- Kristina Wagner (born 1962), American actress
- Kurt Wagner, multiple people
- Lindsay Wagner (disambiguation), multiple people
- Madge Morris Wagner (1862–1924), American poet and journalist
- Marah Wagner (born 2000), American ice hockey player
- Markus Wagner (born 1964), German politician
- Martin Wagner (disambiguation), several people
- Mary Wagner (born 1949), American politician and jurist
- Mathias Wagner (born 1974), German politician
- Matt Wagner (born 1961), American comics writer and artist
- Melinda Wagner (born 1957), American composer
- Michael Wagner, multiple people
- Milt Wagner (born 1963), American former basketball coach and former basketball player
- Mirel Wagner (born 1987) Ethiopia-born Finnish singer-songwriter
- Moritz Wagner, multiple people
- Nancy Wagner, American politician from Delaware
- Nándor Wagner (1922–1997), Hungarian sculptor
- Natasha Gregson Wagner (born 1970), American actress
- Neil Wagner (disambiguation), multiple people
- Nike Wagner (born 1945), German dramaturge, daughter of Wieland Wagner
- Nikolai Wagner (1829–1907), Russian zoologist, writer and psychic researcher
- Otto Wagner (1841–1918), Austrian architect and urban planner
- Paul Wagner (born 1967), American baseball player
- Paula Wagner (born 1946), American film and theatre producer and film executive
- Pauline Wagner (1910–2014), American actress, dancer and glamour girl
- Renan Wagner (born 1991), Brazilian footballer
- René Wagner (born 1972), Czech footballer and manager
- Richard Wagner (disambiguation), multiple people
- Robert Wagner (disambiguation), multiple people
- Robin Wagner, multiple people
- Ruth Wagner (1940–2025), German politician
- Ryan Wagner (born 1982), Major League Baseball player
- Sandro Wagner (born 1987), German footballer
- Sascha H. Wagner (born 1980), German politician
- Siegfried Wagner (1869–1930), German composer and conductor, son of Richard and Cosima Wagner
- Sofia Wagner (born 2010) paraguayan born in lambare city
- Stanley Wagner (disambiguation), several people
- Steve Wagner (disambiguation), several people
- Sue Wagner (1940–2026), American politician
- Susan Wagner (born 1961), American businesswoman
- Thomas Wagner (disambiguation), several people
- Tini Wagner (1919–2004), Dutch swimmer
- Todd Wagner (born 1960), American entrepreneur, co-founder, founder and CEO
- Tyler Wagner (born 1991), American Major League Baseball and Atlantic League of Professional Baseball player
- Thomas Wagner, multiple people
- Viktor Wagner (1908–1981), Russian mathematician
- Vladimir Wagner (1849–1934), Russian psychologist and naturalist
- Walter Wagner, multiple people
- Warren Wagner, multiple people
- Webster Wagner (1817–1882), American railroad inventor, manufacturer and politician
- Wende Wagner (1941–1997), American actress
- Wendy Wagner (1973–2025), American cross-country skier
- Wieland Wagner (1917–1966), German opera director and producer, son of Siegfried Wagner and Winifred Wagner
- Wilhelm Wagner, multiple people
- Willi Wagner (born 1941), German Olympic athlete
- William Wagner (disambiguation), multiple people
- Winifred Wagner (1897–1980), British-born director of the Bayreuth Festival, wife of Siegfried Wagner and friend of Adolf Hitler
- Wolfgang Wagner (disambiguation), several people

== People with the surname Wagnerová ==
In Czech, the feminine form of the surname is Wagnerová. Notable people with the surname include:

- Alena Wagnerová (born 1936), Czech author and journalist
- Eliška Wagnerová (1948–2025), Czech judge and politician
- Magdalena Wagnerová (born 1960), Czech writer
- Petra Novotná (orienteer) (née Wagnerová, born 1966), Czech orienteering competitor

== Fictional characters ==
- Ivan Wagner, protagonist of Alexander Belyayev's series Professor Wagner's Inventions
- Kurt Wagner (Nightcrawler) from Marvel Comics
- Talia Wagner (Nocturne) from Marvel Comics
- Lucius Wagner, the main character in the game trilogy Lucius

== See also ==
=== General ===
- Wagner family tree, the composer Richard Wagner and his family, many of whom have been active in the arts
- Julius Wagner-Jauregg (1857–1940), Austrian physician, Nobel Prize laureate in medicine
- Von Wagner, ring name of professional wrestler Calvin Bloom

=== Things named similarly to Wagner ===
- Wagner (disambiguation), a list of things named Wagner
- Wagner (given name), a list of people with given name Wagner
- Vagner (name), a list of people with given name or surname Vagner
- Wágner, a list of people with given name or surname Wágner
- Wagener, a list of people with surname Wagener
- Waggener, a list of people with surname Waggener
- Waggoner, a list of people with surname Wagoner, Waggoner and Waggonner
