= Wagner (given name) =

Wagner is a given name. Notable people with the name include:

- Wagner Diniz Gomes de Araújo (born 1983), Brazilian football player
- Wagner Fernandes (born 1967), Brazilian football player
- Wagner Ferreira dos Santos (born 1985), Brazilian football player
- Wagner (singer), full name Wagner Fiuza-Carrilho, Brazilian singer and participant in The X Factor
- Wagner Jorgensen (1913–1977), American football player
- Wagner Lamounier, Brazilian singer
- Wagner Lopes (born 1969), Japanese football player
- Wagner Moura (born 1976), Brazilian actor
- Wagner Neto (born 1991), Brazilian politician
- Wagner Pereira Cardozo (born 1966), Brazilian football player and coach
- Wagner Ricardo Silva da Silva (born 1991), Brazilian football player
- Wagner Santos Lago (born 1978), Brazilian football player
- Wagner Tiso (born 1945), Brazilian musician

== See also ==
- Wagner (disambiguation)
- Wagner (surname)
- Wágner, given name and surname
- Vagner, given name and surname
