= Richard Wagner (disambiguation) =

Richard Wagner (1813–1883) was a German Romantic composer.

Dick, Rick or Richard Wagner may also refer to:

== People ==
- Richard Paul Wagner (1882–1953), German locomotive designer for Deutsche Reichsbahn 1922–1942
- Richard E. Wagner (born 1941), American economist
- Dick Wagner (1942–2014), American rock musician
- Dick Wagner (activist) (1943–2021), American historian
- Richard Wagner (novelist) (1952–2023), Romanian-born German poet, writer and essayist
- Richard Wagner (judge) (born 1957), Canadian 18th Chief Justice since 2017
- Richard K. Wagner, American psychologist, Alfred Binet Professor at Florida State University since 1999
- Rick Wagner (born 1989), American football offensive tackle
- Dick Wagner (baseball) (1927–2006), American baseball executive

== Places ==
- Richard Wagner Platz (Berlin), Berlin square
- Richard-Wagner-Straße (Munich), Munich street
- Richard-Wagner-Platz (Leipzig), square in Leipzig
- Richard-Wagner-Platz (Berlin U-Bahn), Berlin railway station
- Richard Wagner Monument, in Berlin's Tiergarten
- Richard-Wagner-Festspielhaus, opera house used by Bayreuth festival

== Other ==
- Richard Wagner Festival, a/k/a Bayreuth Festival
- Richard Wagner Conservatory, Viennese music school
- Richard Wagner Foundation run by descendants of Richard Wagner

== See also ==
- Rick Wagoner, American business executive
- Wagner (disambiguation)
- Wagner (surname)
- List of compositions by Richard Wagner
- International Association of Wagner Societies
