= Wagner (disambiguation) =

Richard Wagner (1813–1883) was a German composer.

Wagner may also refer to:

== People ==
- Wagner (surname), including a list of people
- Wagner (given name), a list of people
- Wágner, a given name and surname, including a list of people

== Places ==
=== United States ===
- Wagner, Montana, an unincorporated village
- Wagner, South Dakota, a city
- Wagner, Wisconsin, a town
- Wagner (community), Wisconsin, an unincorporated community in the town
- Wagner Township, Clayton County, Iowa
- Wagner Township, Aitkin County, Minnesota
- Wagner Lake, a lake in Minnesota

=== Canada ===
- Wagner, Alberta, a hamlet

=== Outer space ===
- Wagner (crater), on the planet Mercury
- 3992 Wagner, a main-belt asteroid

== Fictional characters ==
- Wagner, in Christopher Marlowe's play Doctor Faustus, Goethe's Faust and Gounod's opera Faust
- Wagner, a shaman in the video game Fire Emblem: Fūin no Tsurugi
- Wagner, a dragon in the video game Odin Sphere
- Wagner, a pig in the Finnish comic strip Viivi & Wagner
- Kurt Wagner, a.k.a. Nightcrawler (comics), a character in the Marvel universe

== Business ==
- Nestlé Wagner, a frozen pizza brand
- Wagner Manufacturing Company, an cookware and metal products maker (1891–1952)
- Wagner Motorcycle Company, an American manufacturer (1901–1914)

== Military ==
- Wagner Group, a Russian paramilitary organisation
- USS Wagner, a destroyer escort

== Schools ==
- Wagner College, a private liberal arts college on Staten Island, New York City
  - Wagner Seahawks, the athletic program of Wagner College
- Wagner Graduate School of Public Service, New York University
- Karen Wagner High School, a high school in San Antonio, Texas
- W.P. Wagner High School, Edmonton, Alberta, Canada

== Other uses ==
- Wagner (mini-series), a 1983 television series about Richard Wagner
- Wagner Act, common name for the National Labor Relations Act, a 1935 U.S. labor law
- Wagner's disease, familial eye disease of the connective tissue in the eye that causes blindness
- Wagner's law, an economic theory of development
- Wagnerian (horse), a racehorse

== See also ==
- Vagner (disambiguation)
- Wágner (disambiguation)
