= Wilhelm Wagner =

Wilhelm Wagner may refer to either of:

- Wilhelm Richard Wagner (1813–1883), a German composer
- Willi Wagner (born 1941), German Olympic athlete
- Wilhelm Wagner, Ph.D. (1843–1880), a German scholar of medieval and modern Greek poetry
- Wilhelm Wagner, (1895–1977), German entomologist

== See also ==
- Wagner (disambiguation) & (surname)
