= Carl Wagner (disambiguation) =

Carl Wagner (1901–1977) was a German physical chemist.

Carl Wagner may also refer to:

- Carl Wagner (painter) (1796–1867), German painter
- Carl Robert Wagner (1859–1931), German entrepreneur and draftsman
- Carl-Ludwig Wagner (1930–2012), German CDU politician

== See also ==
- Karl Wagner (disambiguation)
- Wagner (surname)
