= John Wagner (disambiguation) =

John Wagner (born 1949) is an American-born British comics writer.

John Wagner may also refer to:

- John A. Wagner (1885–1964), Michigan politician
- John C. Wagner (1858–1937), American politician and businessman
- John D. Wagner, American author and businessman
- John P. Wagner (1874–1955), American baseball shortstop
- John W. Wagner, (1837–1896), Union Army soldier in the American Civil War who received the Medal of Honor

== See also ==
- Jack Wagner (disambiguation)
- Johann Wagner (disambiguation)
- John Waggener (1925–2017), American military officer
- John Wagoner (1923–2017), American football player
