= Sadie Grimm =

Canadian motorcyclist (1895–1970)

Sadie Mildred Grimm
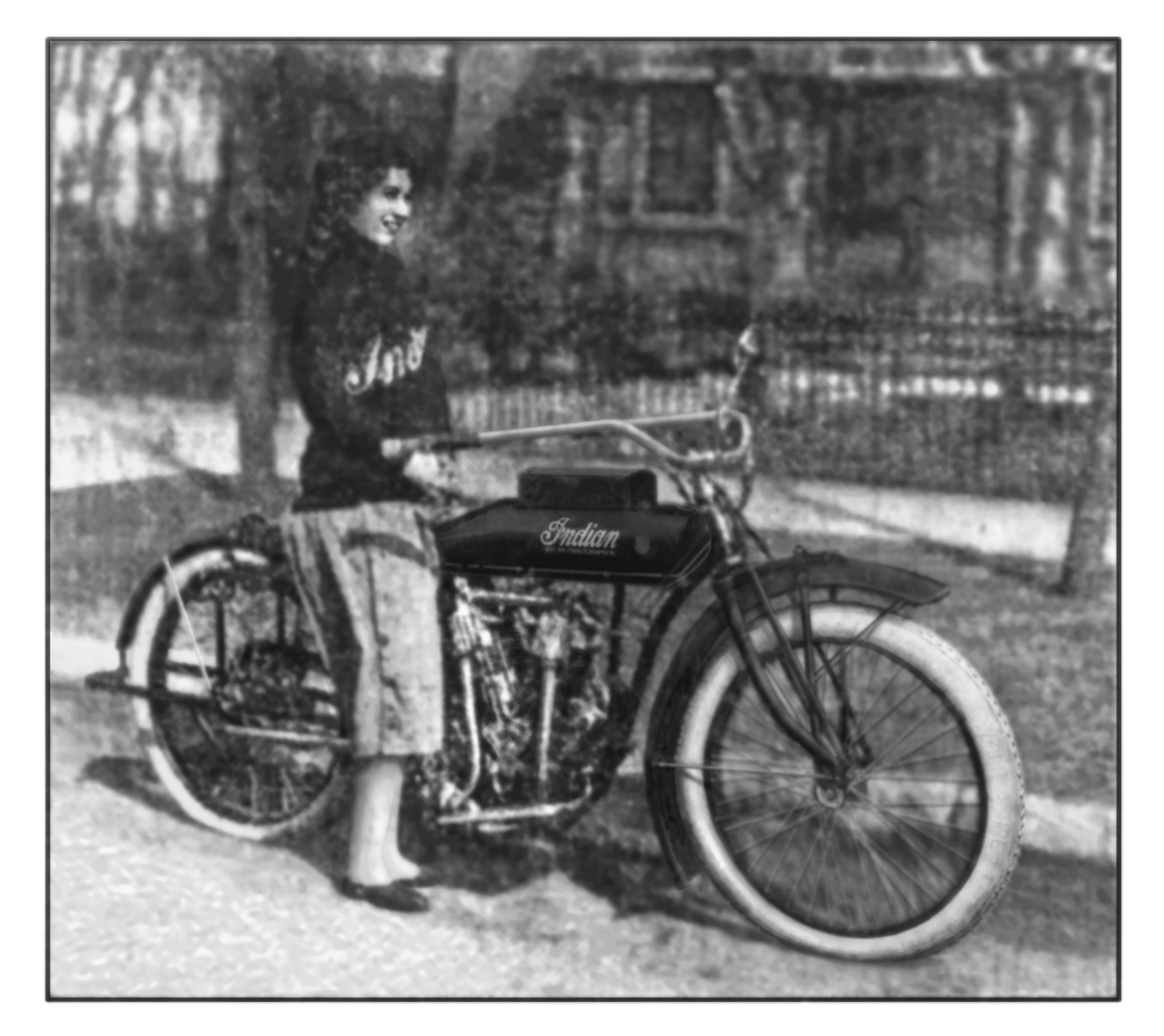
- Sadie Grimm standing beside her 1914 7hp "Big Twin" motorcycle

Sadie Mildred Grimm (27 March 1895 – 8 February 1970) was the winner of the 1914 Manitoba Motorcycle Club's gold medal. This is the first documented award in motorcycling by a woman in Canada in a competition open to men. It is also notable that unlike American Clara Wagner, she was not denied the award due to gender.

There was a significant political element to this competition. The gold medal was to be presented for the first person to ride the approximately fifty-five miles by motorcycle from Winnipeg to the popular resort town of Winnipeg Beach. The roads at that time, like many in the province, were poor to impassible to non-existent with stretches being nothing but swamps and pastures. With thousands flocking to Winnipeg Beach during the summer, the Canadian Pacific Railway had a de facto monopoly on what was claimed to be the most profitable stretch of track in Canada.

To underscore the difficulty of the task, there had been numerous failed attempts by other riders during the winter and early spring prior to Grimm's accomplishment on June 14, 1914. She actually completed the feat twice on the same day by successfully returning to Winnipeg by a different route.

Her novel achievement also made her an obvious choice as a spokesperson for the participation of women in motorcycling where she promoted the activity as benefiting both health and independence. On November 4, 2017, Sadie Grimm was inducted into the Canadian Motorcycle Hall of Fame. On January 28, 2021, the 105th anniversary of Manitoba women being the first in Canada to receive the right to vote, Grimm was announced as one of 150 Manitoba Women Trailblazers.
