= George Wagner =

George, Georg or Georges Wagner may refer to:

== People ==
=== Public officials ===
- George D. Wagner (1829–1869), American general and state official
- G. Harold Wagner (1900–1960), American politician from Pennsylvania
- George O. Wagner (born 1946), American politician from Pennsylvania
- George Wagner, postmaster who named Rosecrans, Sugar Valley, Pennsylvania
- George H. Wagner, candidate in 1970 California gubernatorial election
- George Wagner, candidate in 1975 Saskatchewan general election

=== Sports ===
- Gorgeous George (George Raymond Wagner, 1915–1963), American professional wrestler
- George Wagner (tennis), 1907 U.S. National Championships – Men's singles

=== Other people ===
- George Wagner, hanged in 1867, see List of people executed in New York
- George Wagner, founder of Wagner Motorcycle Company
- Yegor Wagner (1849–1903), sometimes Georg Wagner, elucidated the structure of carvone
- George Wagner, who helped rehabilitate prostitutes at Wykeham Terrace, Brighton
- George Wagner (bishop) (1930–1993), German Eastern Orthodox archbishop
- George Wagner, founder of Leavenworth Nutcracker Museum
- George Wagner (zoologist), see Deepwater cisco
- George Wagner III, suspect in the Pike County shootings

== Other uses ==
- George Wagner House, on List of New York State Historic Markers in Albany County, New York
- George Wagner, a character in the film Are You Listening?

== See also ==
- George Wagner Hale (1894–1945), American baseball catcher
- George Waggner (1894–1984), American director
- George Wagoner (disambiguation)
- Wagner (surname)
