= Gustav Wagner (disambiguation) =

Gustav Wagner (1911–1980) was an Austrian Nazi SS officer, deputy commander of Sobibór extermination camp, and Holocaust perpetrator.

Gustav Wagner may also refer to:

- Gustav Wagner (Wehrmacht) (1890–1951), German Generalmajor in the Wehrmacht during World War II
- Gustav Wagner (bobsledder) (1901–1972), Luxembourgish bobsledder
- Gustav Wagner (doctor), German dermatologist

== See also ==
- Wagner (surname)
