= Wágner =

Wágner is a name. As a given name, it is Portuguese in origin. The surname (Czech feminine: Wágnerová) is a Czechized form of German surname Wagner. Notable people with the name include:

== Given name ==
- Wágner (footballer, born 1945), full name Wágner Canotilho, Brazilian footballer
- Wágner (footballer, born 1969), full name Sebastião Wágner de Souza e Silva, Brazilian footballer
- Wágner (footballer, born 1973), full name Wágner Pires de Almeida, Brazilian footballer
- Wágner (footballer, born 1985), full name Wágner Ferreira dos Santos, Brazilian footballer
- Wágner (footballer, born 1987), full name Wágner de Andrade Borges, Brazilian footballer
- Wágner (footballer, born 1989), full name Wágner Luiz Fogolari, Brazilian footballer

== Surname ==
- József Wágner (born 1961), Hungarian judoka
- Ludvík Wágner, Czech weightlifter
- Martin Wágner (born 1980), Czech photographer
- Pál Wágner (born 1935), Hungarian rower
- Raimundo Wágner (born 1971), Brazilian football coach and former player
- Tomáš Wágner (born 1990), Czech footballer

== See also ==
- Vagner
- Wagner (disambiguation)
