= List of presidents of Disney Channel =

Disney Branded Television is a unit of the Disney Entertainment business segment of the Walt Disney Company.

== Alan Wagner (1983–1984) ==
Wagner left CBS in 1982 when the Walt Disney Company approached him to become the first president of Disney Channel. The cable channel was a novel idea at the time, being the first cable station to be entirely dedicated to programming for children and the family. Given a $100 million budget, Wagner put together a staff of programmers to create new shows for the channel in addition to drawing from Disney’s extensive collection of prior television programs and films. The channel's first broadcasting day aired on April 18, 1983. It initially started with a 16-hour-a-day service.

Wagner left Disney Channel after the station's first year of programming, after which he formed his own independent film and television production company, Boardwalk Entertainment.

== Anne Sweeney (1996–2004) ==
Sweeney joined The Walt Disney Company in February 1996 as president of Disney Channel and executive vice president of Disney/ABC Cable Networks.

From October 2000 to April 2004, Sweeney served as president of ABC Cable Networks Group and The Disney Channel Worldwide. Continuing with the strategy that was begun by her predecessor John F. Cooke, The Disney Channel more than quintupled its subscriber base with its mix of original series and movies and acquired programming. It is now available on basic cable in more than 87 million homes in the United States. Disney Channel executives hoped to become more "boy friendly" in 2010; especially when Good Luck Charlie premiered and when Aaron Stone and Zeke and Luther joined the main program line-up.

In April 2004, she was named president of the Disney/ABC Television Group. In this role, Sweeney is responsible for Disney's entertainment and news television properties globally. These include the ABC Television Network, which encompasses ABC Entertainment, ABC Kids, ABC Daytime, ABC Sports and ABC News; ABC Studios, which is the television production division of the Disney-ABC Television Group; and Disney ABC Cable Networks Group, comprising The Disney Channel Worldwide—which has grown to 24 wholly owned international channels—Toon Disney, SOAPnet, ABC Family and Jetix. She oversees Walt Disney Television Animation, Buena Vista Worldwide Television and Walt Disney Television International, and has responsibility for managing Disney's equity interests in Lifetime Entertainment Services, and A&E Television Networks.

== Rich Ross (2004–2009) ==
In 1996, Ross joined Disney Channel in programming and production as a senior vice president, becoming general manager and executive vice president in 1999. In 2002 he became president of entertainment for Disney Channel, before being named president of Disney Channels Worldwide in 2004, where he oversaw the Disney Channel, Disney XD, Playhouse Disney, Disney Cinemagic, Hungama, GXT, Jetix, and Radio Disney brands. He is credited with establishing Disney's global kids' TV business as the prime entertainment source for the tween market with shows like Hannah Montana, Lizzie McGuire, Wizards of Waverly Place, The Suite Life of Zack & Cody and The Suite Life on Deck, That's So Raven and Phineas and Ferb. He launched the highly successful Disney Channel Original Movie franchise that produced the worldwide hit High School Musical series, as well as the Camp Rock and The Cheetah Girls series. Popular Playhouse Disney shows developed during his tenure include Handy Manny and Mickey Mouse Clubhouse.

== Gary Marsh (2011–2021) ==
Marsh joined Disney Channel in July 1988 as executive director, original programming. He was made vice president eight months later, and in 1994 became senior vice president. In 1999, he was promoted to executive vice president, and in 2001 Marsh assumed the role of executive vice president, original programming and production, Disney Channel. From 2005 to 2009, he was president, entertainment, Disney Channels Worldwide, and in 2009 he assumed the role as chief creative officer, Disney Channels Worldwide, before being promoted to president and chief creative officer, Disney Channels Worldwide, in 2011.

== Ayo Davis (2021–present) ==
In September 2021, Davis, who most recently served as the EVP, creative development, and strategy, was promoted as president by Peter Rice (chairman of Disney General Entertainment).
