= Santa Cruz Civic Auditorium =

Concert hall in Santa Cruz, California

Coordinates: 36.97395°N 122.0292°W

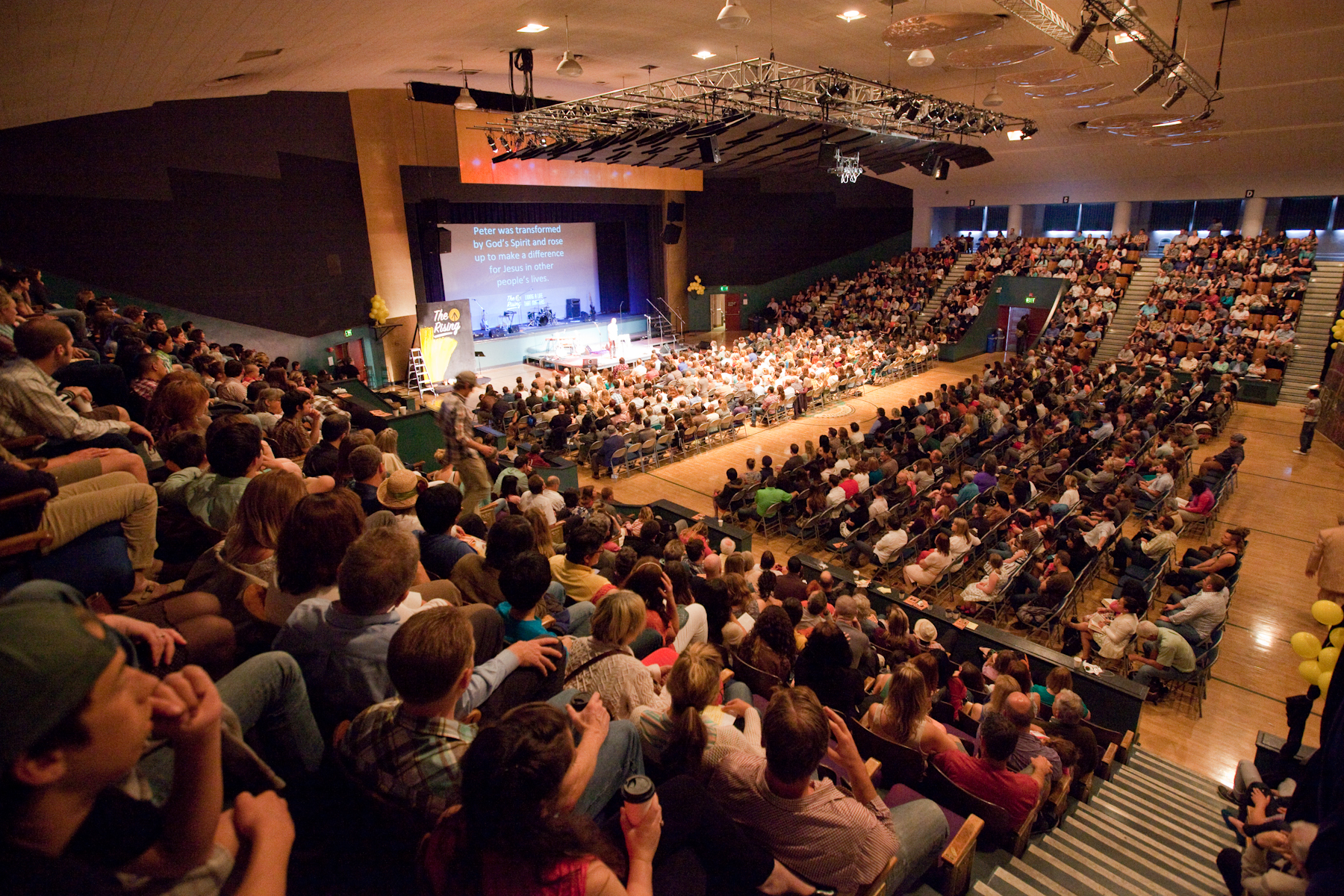
Easter service at the Santa Cruz Civic Auditorium, 2013

The Santa Cruz Civic Auditorium is an event and convention venue located in downtown Santa Cruz, California. It is owned by the City of Santa Cruz and is located at 307 Church Street. Opened in 1940, it was built in what was described as, "Mission-style in architecture with a modern touch and an arrangement of open porches on the corners and sides." Its style has also been described as Art Deco. It is the home of the Santa Cruz County Symphony and the Cabrillo Festival of Contemporary Music as well as other concerts, expos, conferences, and sporting events. A carillon was installed in 1963.

In 1956, the Santa Cruz Civic Auditorium was the location of a rock and roll concert that drew national attention after the local police stopped the event because of what they characterized as the dancers' "suggestive, stimulating and tantalizing motions".

The Santa Cruz Civic Auditorium was the site of the annual Miss California beauty pageant from 1966 until 1985, when the pageant left Santa Cruz after years of protests and a "Myth California" counter-pageant organized by local feminist activists led by Ann Simonton and Nikki Craft.

In 1984, artist Guillermo Wagner Granizo donated a ceramic tile mural entitled, "A Gift of Appreciation to this Area," which featured imagery of past events at the Santa Cruz Civic Auditorium.

The auditorium was used as a temporary shelter for displaced and homeless people following the 1989 Loma Prieta earthquake. It was used for this purpose again in 2020 during the CZU Lightning Complex fires.

== Concerts ==
The Civic Auditorium hosted numerous bands such as Bad Religion, Bob Dylan, Bob Marley and the Wailers, Fela Kuti, Huddy, Amalia Rodrigues, Oliver Tree and Ween.
