= Rowac =

Hardware factory founded by Carl Robert Wagner in 1888, Chemnitz

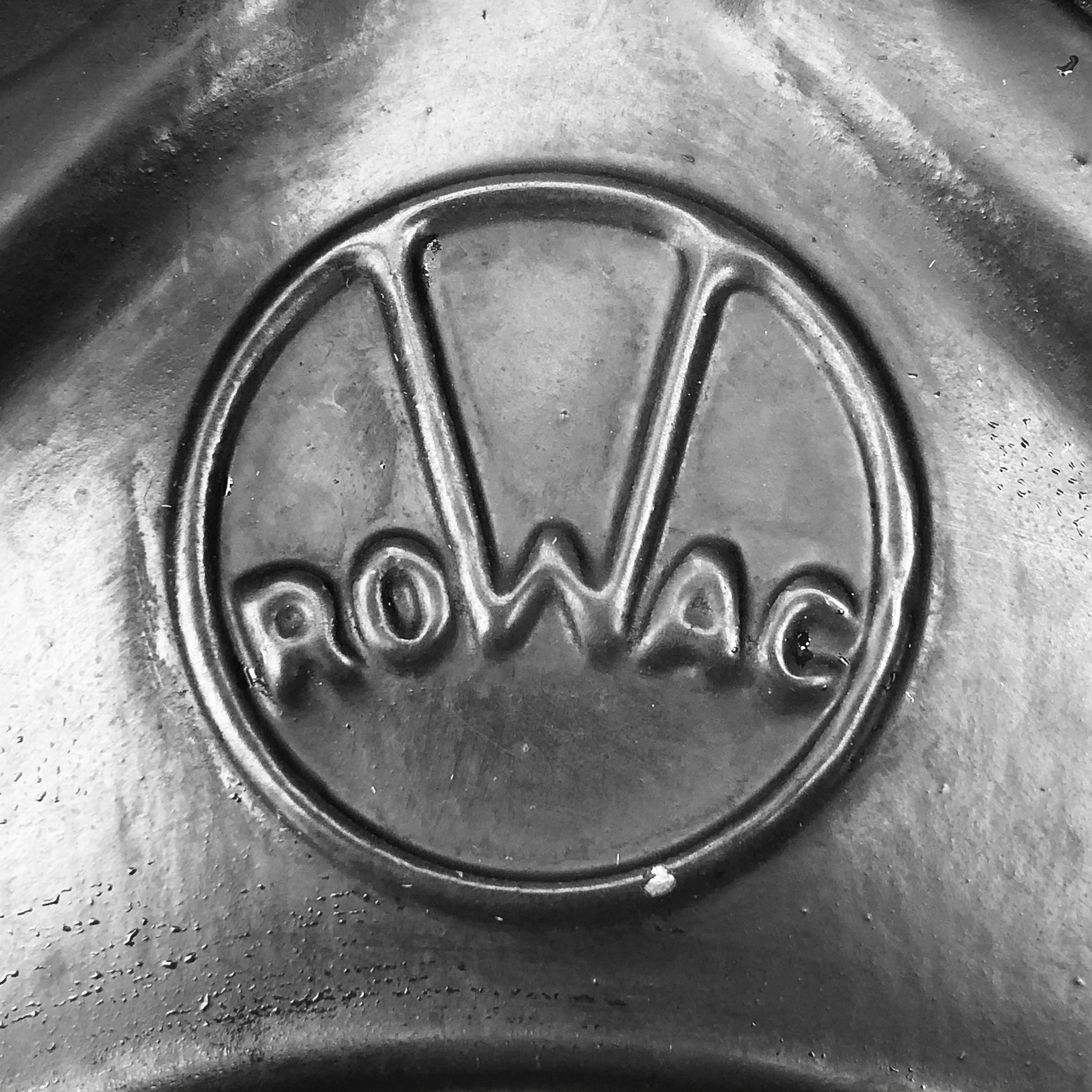
- Type: KG
- Industry: Industrial Furniture & Hardware
- Founded: 1888
- Founder: Carl Robert Wagner
- Defunct: 1946
- Fate: Expropriation & conversion into a publicly owned company
- Headquarters: Chemnitz, Germany
- Website: rowac.com

Rowac (acronym for Robert Wagner Chemnitz) was a hardware factory founded by Carl Robert Wagner in 1888 in Chemnitz, Germany which most notably produced furniture for industrial use. Carl Robert Wagner is regarded as the inventor of the steel stool, which among other things was chosen for the workshops and classrooms of the Bauhaus Dessau. Today, mainly stools, chairs and cabinets carrying the Rowac name are traded as antiques.

== History ==
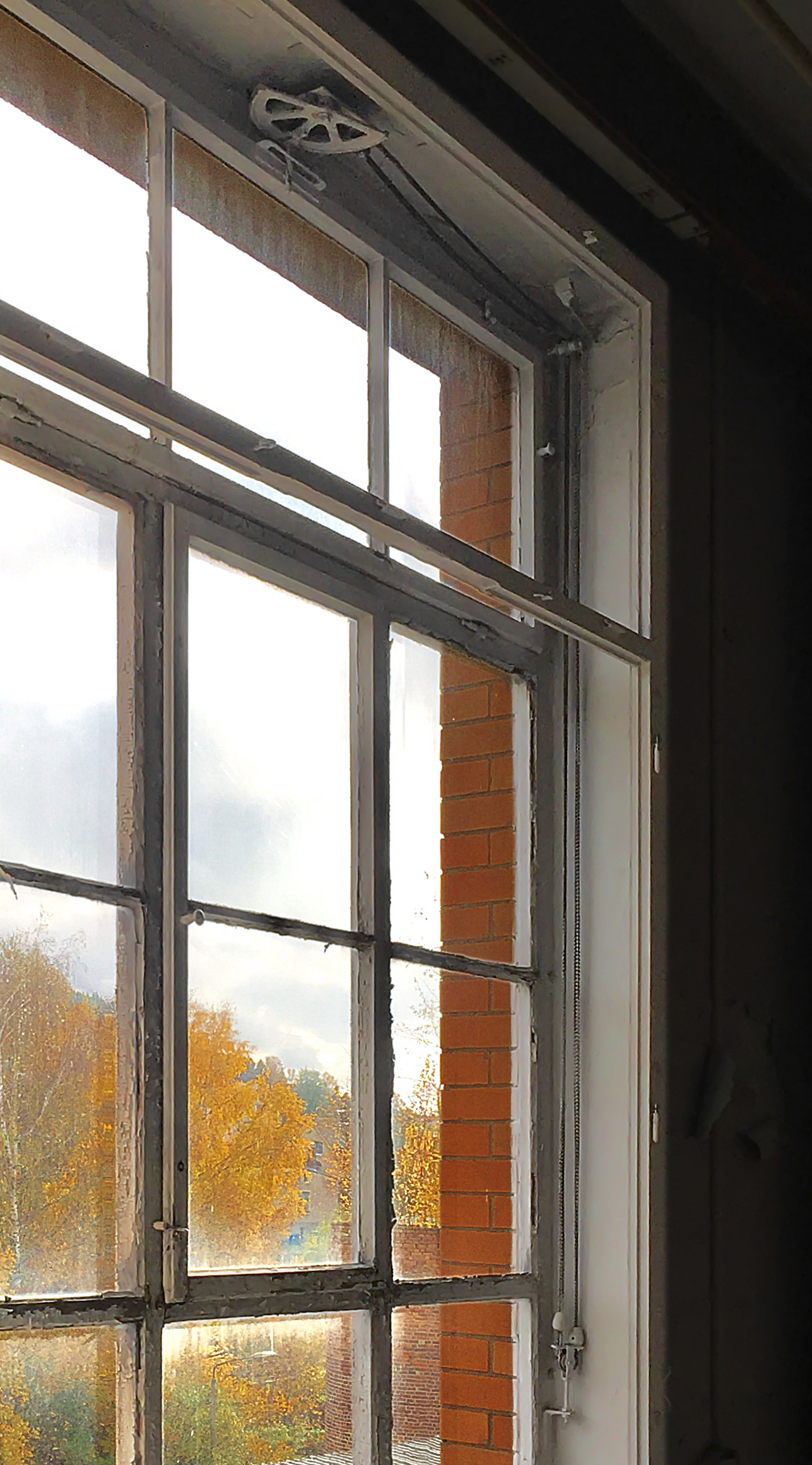
Ventilation window closure in the old ESDA stocking factory in Thalheim, Germany

=== From foundation to fast–growing company (1888–1904) ===
On May 11, 1888, Carl Robert Wagner founded the Hardware Factory Robert Wagner Chemnitz, abbreviated Rowac, with the company located in the Zschopauer Straße in Chemnitz, Germany. The company was entered in the commercial register on March 9, 1895. Carl Robert Wagner embarked on his entrepreneurial career with the production of mass-produced products made of steel and wood, such as a wide range of closures and fittings for windows, as well as bottle crates.

The company was initially listed in the Saxony/Thuringia manufacturers' address book in 1893 as a draw curtain furnishing factory. And no later than 1896, with the patent for a ventilation window closure, Rowac not only quickly acquired a satisfied customer base, but also asserted itself alongside its competitors. In 1898, the German Construction Newspaper (Deutsche Bauzeitung) had a resoundingly positive opinion of the ventilation window closure, as the mechanisms in use up to that time could not be recommended due to their major shortcomings. The so-called "Wagner'sche Verschluss" was particularly suitable for opening large and heavy overhead windows, such as those found in very high rooms, such as churches, concert halls, hospital halls, riding halls and gymnasiums. The advantage of the mechanism was an effortless opening and closing of the overhead windows of any width by simply pulling a chain connected to a semi-circular cogwheel mounted in the center of the overhead windows. Apart from these advantages, the initial cost was even lower than that of other designs for the same purpose. In Dresden, Wagner's ventilation window closures were installed in, among other places, the Residence Palace, the Imperial Palace, railroad station buildings and the district school in the neighborhood of Striesen.

The constantly growing demand was so high that the company had to move its factory premises within Chemnitz several times, before finally in 1900 a location was chosen in Altchemnitz (Annaberger Straße 282a). A modern factory complex planned by architect Wenzel Bürger was built here. Besides the expansion, it is worth mentioning that in the same year Carl Robert Wagner was even awarded an honorary certificate, a gold medal, from the permanent trade exhibition in Leipzig, and in old Rowac brochures there are references from the former royal and municipal authorities across Germany.

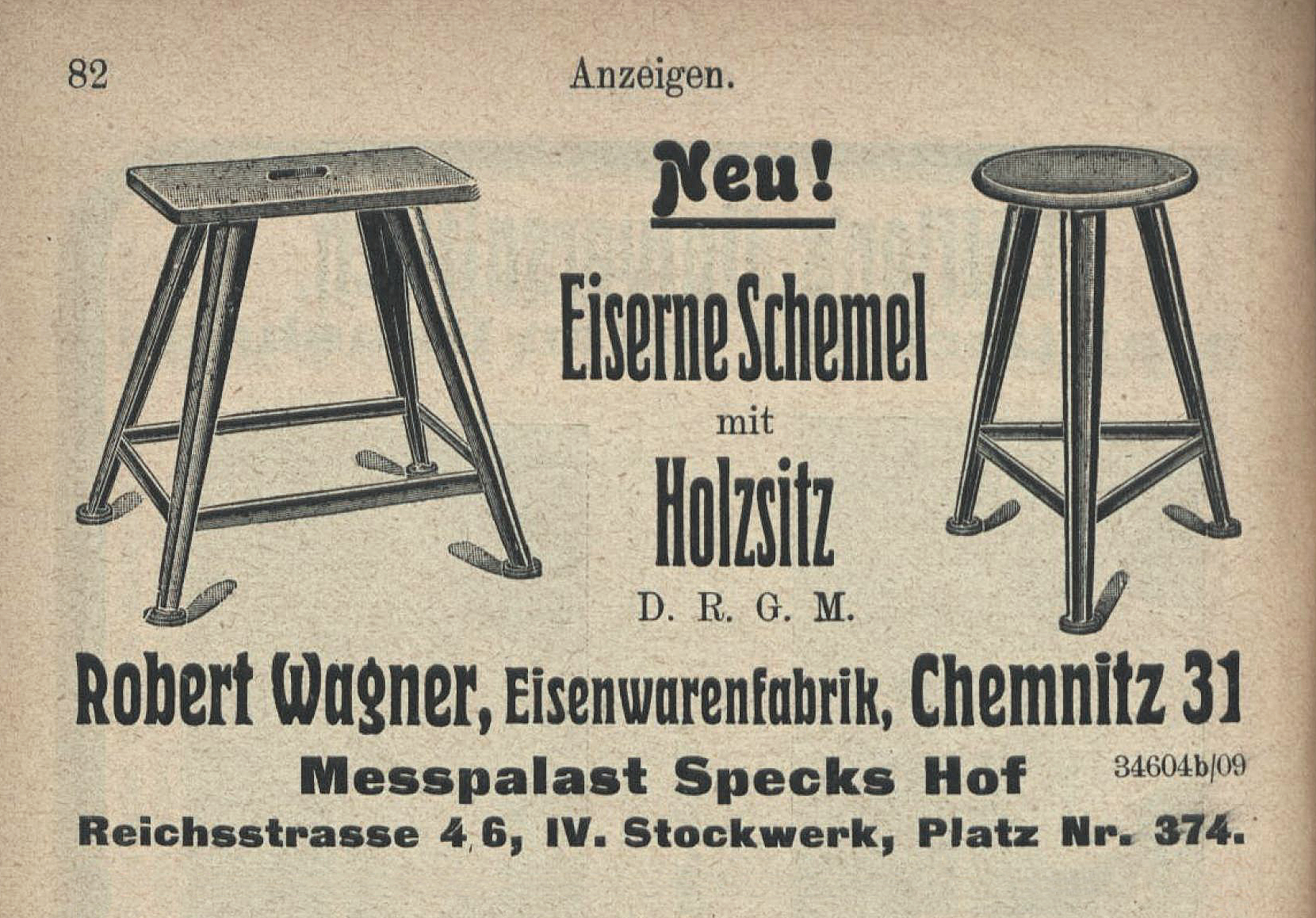
Advertisement for steel stools in the Leipziger Messe Address Book 1909

=== Specialization in steel furniture and industrial equipment (1905–1938) ===
Over the years, the product range changed and Rowac concentrated more and more on steel furniture and industrial equipment. It specialised in creating ergonomic seating for workshops and offices. At least once a year, the products were exhibited at the Leipzig Trade Fair (Leipziger Messe). The Rowac stool in particular earned a strong reputation. It is considered the first industrially produced steel stool and was widely used in the 1920s. The reason for this was its superior durability compared to simple wooden stools, which had to be repaired again and again due to cracks, loose legs, etc. It is of particular note that in 1923 architects Max Taut und Franz Hoffman chose Rowac stools to furnish the administration building of the General German Trade Union Federation in Berlin-Mitte, and in 1926 the stools found a place in the classrooms and workshops of Walter Gropius' Bauhaus building in Dessau.

At its peak, Rowac employed up to 175 people. In addition to stools, Rowac also produced chairs, tables and benches made of steel, which were used, for example, to furnish entourage rooms. But tool cabinets, cotton wool and waste bins, transport and storage bins, and all kinds of bottle and spool crates were also produced. Among other things, the Monthly Newspaper for the Textile Industry in Leipzig (Leipziger Monatsschrift für Textil-Industrie) wrote in 1925: "In the field of auxiliary equipment for weaving and knitting, spool transport and dampening boxes by Robert Wagner, Chemnitz, should be mentioned." Goods were supplied to all European countries (with the exception of Russia, Poland and the Balkan states) until the effects of the Great Depression were also felt in Saxony. At the meeting of Saxon industry on 23 January 1931 in Chemnitz, leading industrialists, including Kurt Robert Wagner (the son of Carl Robert Wagner), spoke out about the consequences of the economic catastrophe in Saxony.

After the death of Carl Robert Wagner in 1931, his son, Kurt Robert Wagner, and his grandsons, Hans Kurt Wagner and Werner Alexander Wagner, took over management of the company. The guiding principle of the company continued to be "the creation of healthy workstations", which was even referenced as a prime example in specialist literature on hygiene in the office workplace in 1931.

=== Wartime and expropriation (1939–1946) ===
During the Second World War, a manufacturing ban was imposed on the production of steel furniture in Germany. This also led to considerable restrictions for the company in supplying customers throughout Europe. A letter from 1941 from Rowac to the wheat starch factory Crespel & Deiters in Ibbenbüren reveals that the processing of the steel chassis of the swivel chairs was switched to beech wood. The Rowac company initially continued operating during this period because it fulfilled orders for the navy, aviation, the military, the national defense industry, the Ingolstadt ammunition factory, the state railway, the German state post office and police. These were furnishings, such as various boxes, tables and benches, which were also used for air-raid shelters. In 1946, however, the company was expropriated and converted into VEB BEMEFA (industrial equipment and hardware factory). In 1990, the company bemefa Metallmöbel GmbH was privatised and has remained at the same location ever since.

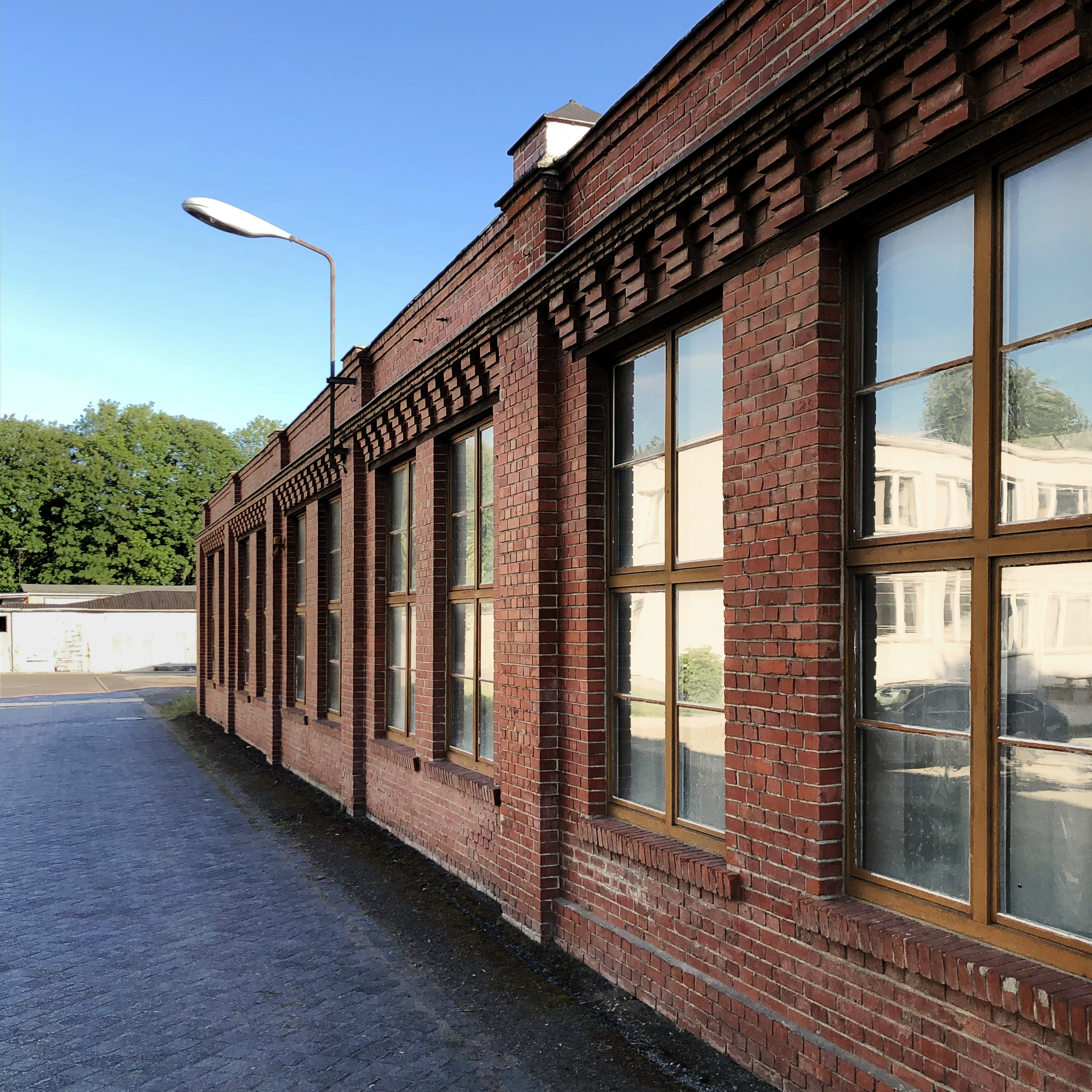
The Bemefa Factory Building (formerly Rowac)

=== Present ===
Today, Rowac products are bought and sold as antiques and exhibited in museums. Some of the original stools from the Bauhaus building are kept in the archives of the Bauhaus Dessau Foundation. In the Museum of Applied Arts, Vienna (MAK), a stool as well as a Rowac advertising stamp can be found. A bottle crate made by Rowac is exhibited in the Kreismuseum Bitterfeld. The Rowac stool is included in the chair collection of the Institute for Art History, Architecture and Urbanism at the Delft University of Technology, Netherlands. Various Rowac stools can also be found in the permanent exhibition of the Industrial Museum in Chemnitz. Built in 1901, the factory building is a protected historic landmark and continues to be used by bemefa Metallmöbel GmbH for the production of metal furniture. At the end of 2015, Goldstein & Co. in Leipzig, together with the former copyright holder, relaunched the Rowac folding stool.

== Product range ==
=== Stools ===
Model I, II, III, IV, folding stool

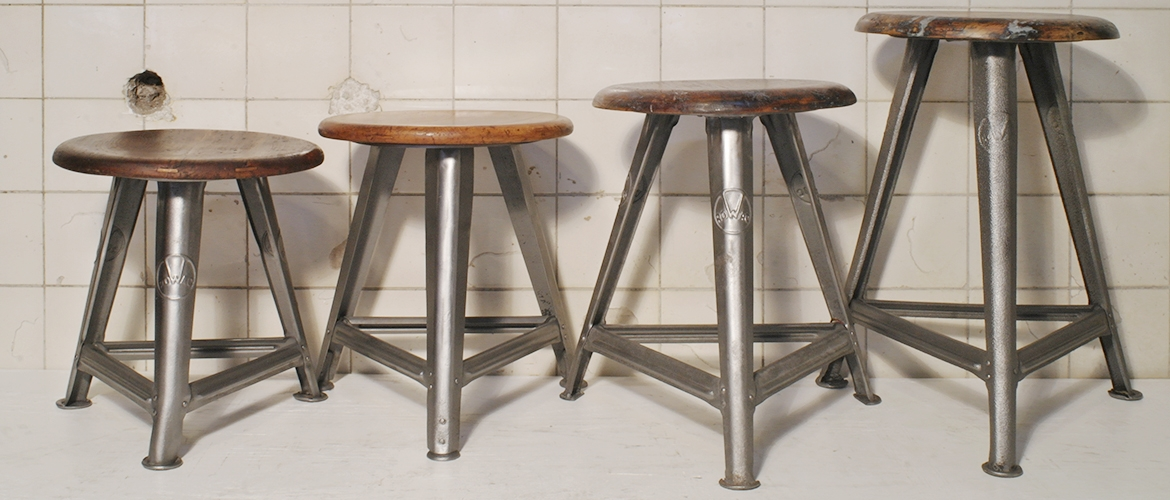
Rowac stools in various heights (model I)

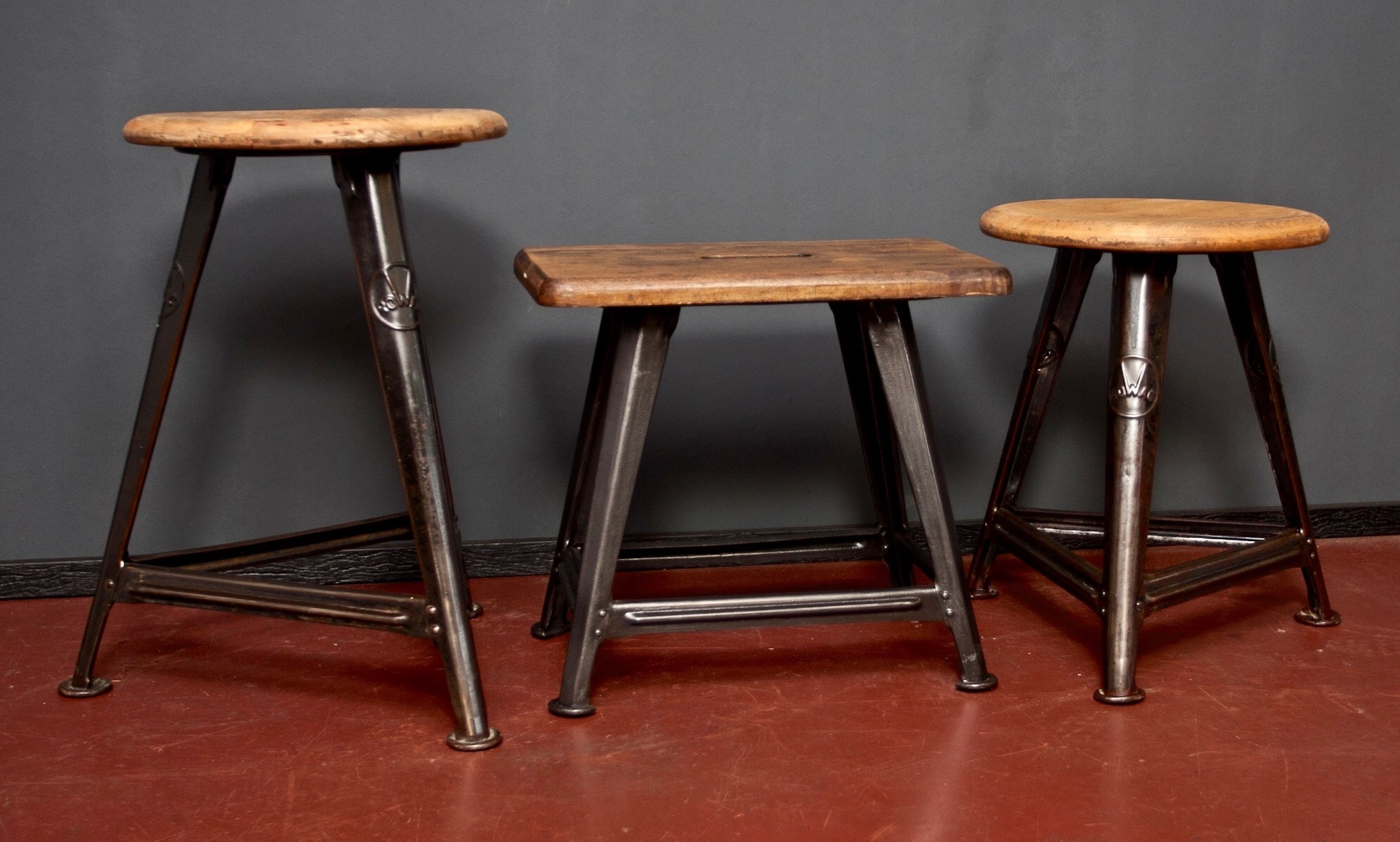
Three- and four-legged Rowac stools (model I & II)

In a document celebrating the 50th anniversary of the company, the Rowac stool is touted as the first steel stool to be manufactured and sold. The first model, a three-legged stool with a round wooden seat, was conceived in 1905 and presented for the first time at the Leipziger Michaelis-Messe (Leipzig Michaelis Trade Fair) in 1909. Rowac advertised the stool in a brochure as follows: "One principle applies to every business: work that can be done just as well sitting down should never be done standing up". At first it was a big gamble to bring this entirely new product to market. But as early as 1909, it was praised in the General Journal for Watchmaking (Allgemeinen Journal der Uhrmacherkunst) for its great durability compared to simple wooden stools for use in workshops. In addition, the purchasing costs were also much lower because repairs were virtually eliminated. Among others, the Rowac stools were brought to market by the retailers Gustav Sturm in Leipzig and Wilhelm Herbst in Berlin. By the 1920s at the latest, they were in widespread use, especially in workshops and factories. Today, the three-legged stool is one of Rowac's best-known products. It was not only offered in different heights, but also with a backrest (model IV), as a four-legged version with a rectangular wooden seat (model II), as a folding stool and for special applications also as a height-adjustable swivel stool (model III). A rare example is model Ib, which is welded rather than riveted like all the other models.

Characteristic of models I, II, III and IV are the U-shaped bent legs, which broaden from the bottom to the top, as well as the horizontal L-shaped bent supporting struts. This braced frame construction of formed and riveted steel sheet ensures the greatest possible stability. The legs are fitted with elaborately folded, non-detachable feet which provide a flat surface in order to protect floors. The rounded details of the base were important to prevent damage to the sitter's clothes and shoes. The wooden seat (initially made of solid wood and later plywood) is attached to a base plate of embossed steel sheet via screws. The basic construction of the Rowac stool has always remained the same, but various originals and brochures indicate that individual parts, such as the foot, the legs, the struts and the wooden seat, were developed further over the years. For example, the foot was initially round and was not fitted with the patented semicircular foot until the 1930s, which provided even more durability. When looking at the overall structure with all its individual parts, it becomes clear why Robin Rehm in his book The Bauhaus Building in Dessau (Das Bauhausgebäude in Dessau) compares it to the steel structures of bridges, exhibition halls and towers of the second half of the 19th century. No wonder that even back then, the enormously high durability was emphasised, and even nowadays, after more than 100 years, they can still be found in immaculate condition. From the 1920s onwards, in order to distinguish themselves from the market and as a sign of quality, the legs, sometimes also the base plate, were embossed with the Rowac logo. Essentially, the design of the Rowac stool is reduced and matter-of-fact, because it was conceived for use in the factory and not for an aesthetically attentive public. It was first at the Bauhaus and in Max Taut's office building that the Rowac stool was given a representative role.

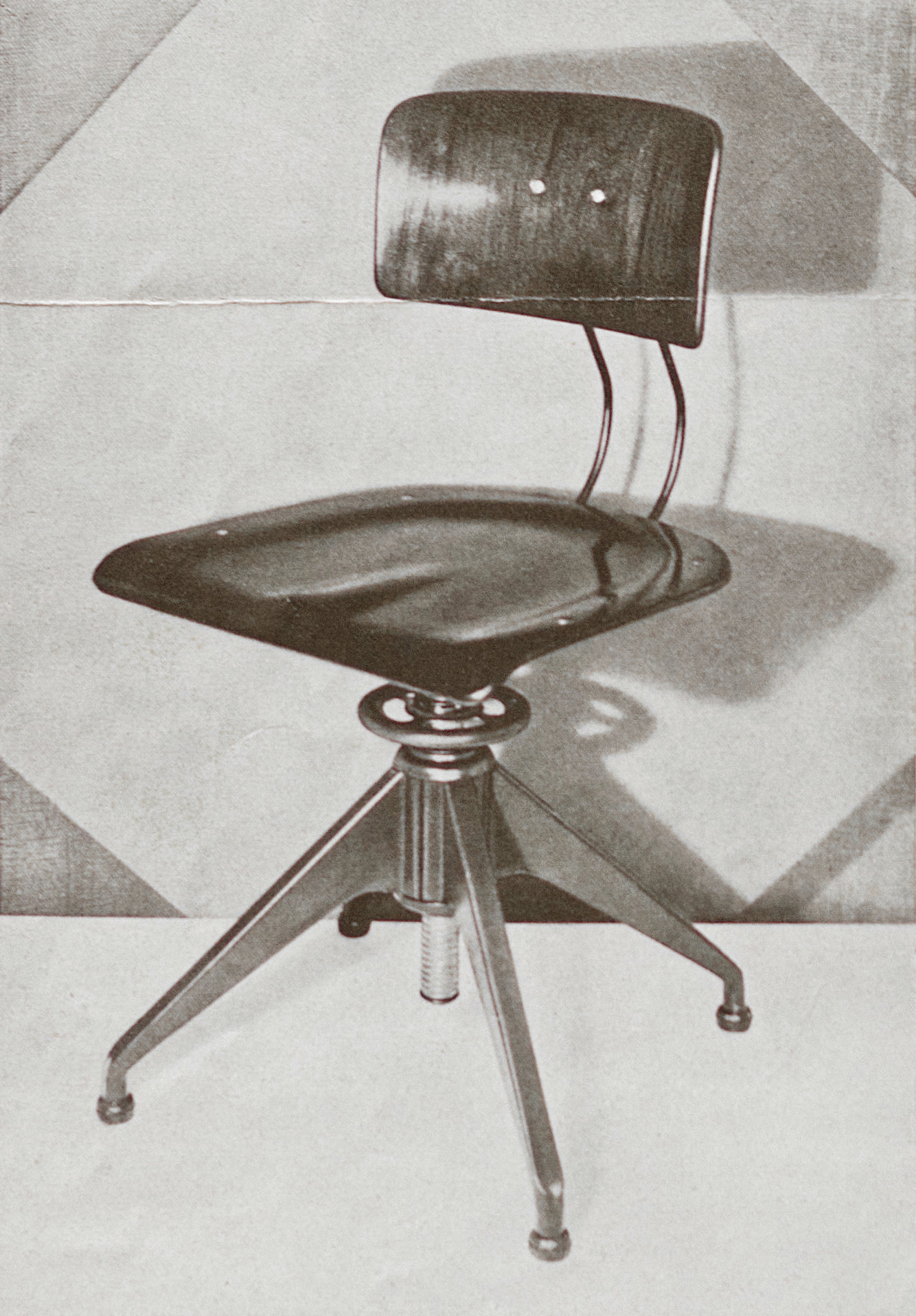
Swivel chair model XII b in a Rowac brochure

=== Chairs and swivel chairs ===
Modell X, XI, XI a, XII a & b, XIII, XVI

With the specialisation in ergonomic seating for workshops and offices, Rowac also created chairs with elastic backrests. The first of these were steel work chairs with curved backrests (models X and XI), which featured a sturdy construction comparable to the stool and were mainly used in workshops, and the steel chair (model XI a), which was used to furnish break-rooms. The second type was the swivel chair (models XII a and b), in which not only the seat height but also the backrest could be adjusted (model XII b even had a horizontally and vertically adjustable backrest). The adjustments could be changed individually by a simple turn of the hand and without the need for any tools. The purpose was clearly to ensure a healthy, correct and straight sitting posture. It is also admirable how comfortable the chairs are due to the suspension of the wide saddle seat which ultimately has the effect of an upholstered seat. Due to the ban on manufacturing steel furniture during the Second World War, the processing of the steel frame had to be switched to beech wood. A rare example is the armrest swivel chair (model XVI), which served among other things as a fixture in the legendary Feuerhand factory in Beierfeld, Germany. As with the stools, the chairs were also specially designed to protect clothes, shoes and floors. In the supplement "Hygiene in the office & in commercial operations" of the 1931 edition of The Central Journal for Industrial Hygiene & Accident Prevention, it was emphasised, among other things, how important it is to choose the right office chairs. For example, there should be enough space between the chair and the lower edge of the desk and the chair should not have any armrests that could hinder the user. In this context, the Rowac typewriter swivel chair was mentioned as an example. The steel chairs were also examined by physicians and found to comply with the regulations of the time. The company also received several patents, e.g. on the elastic backrest.

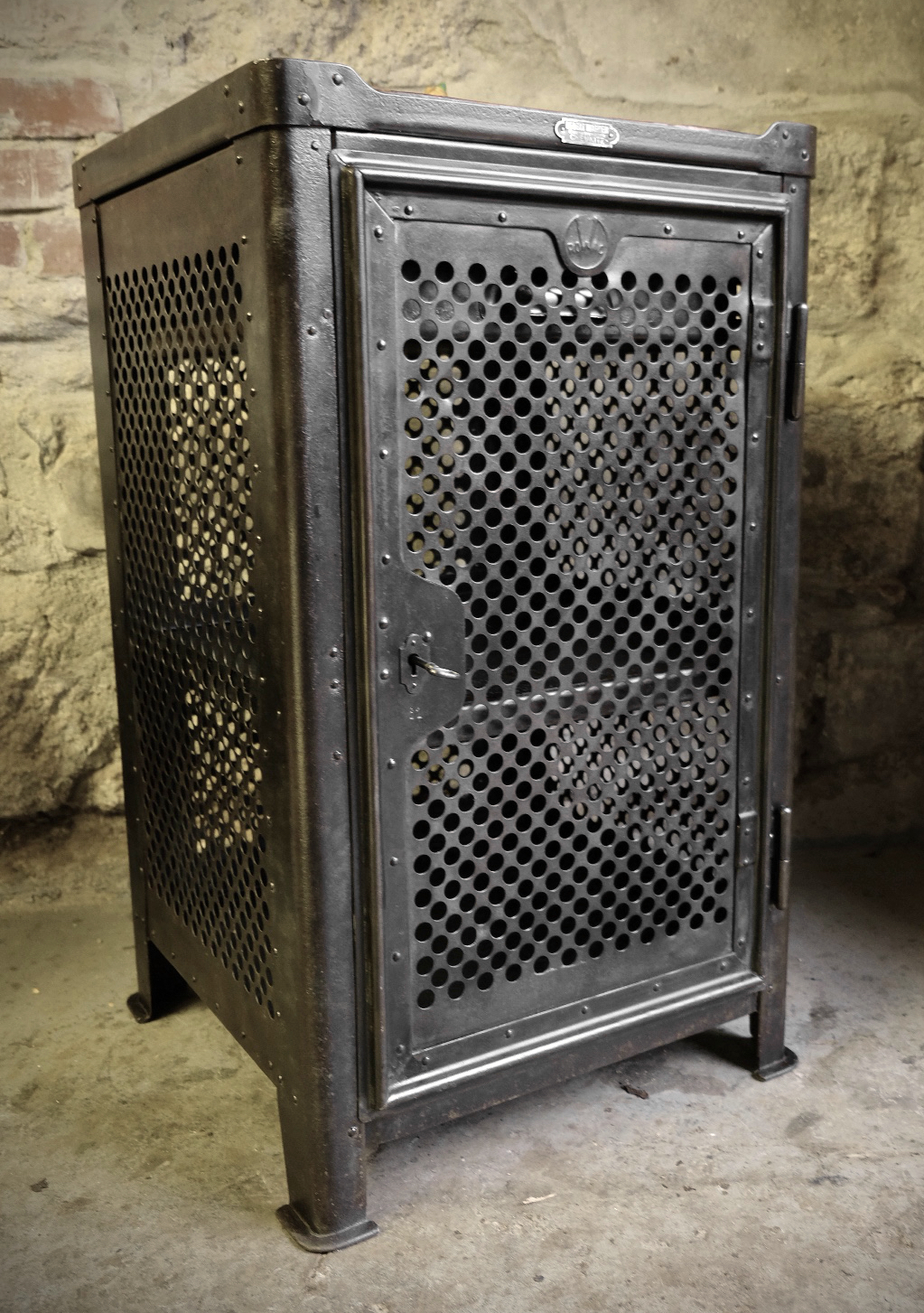
Tool cabinet no. 4 with perforated sheet metal covering

=== Tool cabinets and tables ===
Model Nr. 2, 4 to 8, wall cabinet

Metal lathes, drill-presses and milling-machines often required an assortment of bits, wrenches and many other tools. Rowac produced tool cabinets and tables, to put an end to the resulting time-consuming searches for all of these different tools and to keep everything in order. These products attracted special attention for their well-proportioned, stable and durable construction. As with the stools and chairs, Rowac offered these in various configurations. Not only were the tool cabinets available in different sizes, but also with panels made of perforated (model no. 4+5) or solid steel sheet (model no. 6-8), with steel shelves, with or without drawers (model no. 4-8, optionally made of steel or wood) and lockable doors. Models No. 2, 4 and 5 have a hardwood worktop, while models No. 6-8 have a plywood worktop. A rare example is the wall-mounted tool cabinet. Another rarity are the collapsible tables with wooden tops and coloured linoleum which were used for break-rooms.

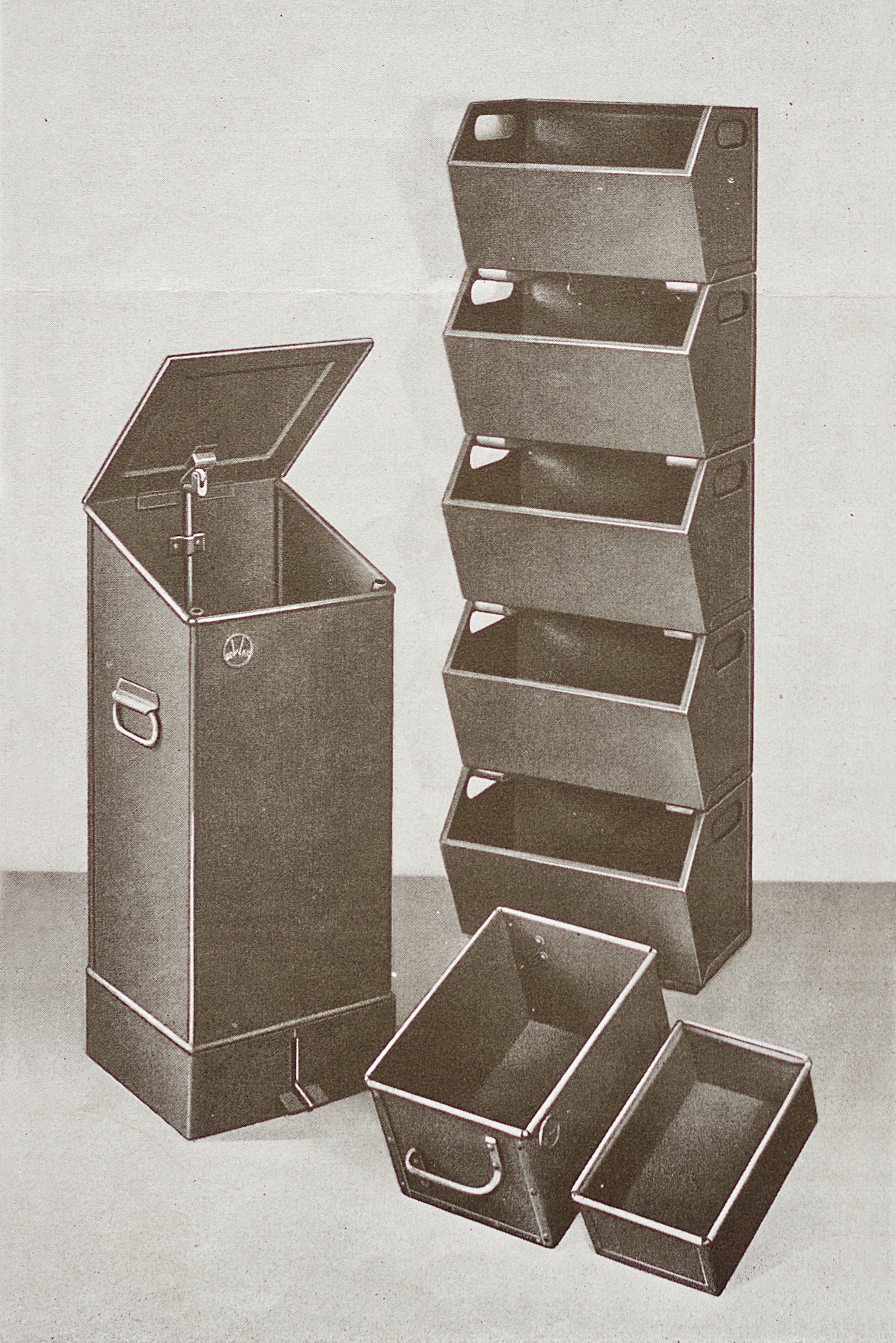
Various crates and boxes in a Rowac brochure

=== Containers and bins for transport, open front storage, waste and cotton wool ===
Industrial enterprises of the time made extensive use of containers for storing and transporting small parts and components. Wooden containers were known to fall apart after heavy use, leading Rowac to introduce a sturdy metal alternative. Metal and wooden products were often cleaned and polished using cotton wool soaked in flammable oils. To prevent fires, the company developed fireproof bins for storing this used up cotton wool. Rowac not only offered a wide range of containers, but also created customised solutions based on customer needs and requirements. The transport containers, for example, were available in different sizes, in a tapered format, with a handle opening and optionally with or without compartments. On request, not only different materials (plain or galvanised steel) but also different material thicknesses and even the option of oil-tight welding could be specified. All transport containers were provided with a strong round steel reinforcement along the upper edge for a particularly long service life. Like the transport containers, the open front storage boxes were also offered in different sizes according to requirements and were equipped with handle openings and two bottom rails made of hardwood. The cotton wool bins had a carrying handle on each side and an embossed label. They were available in three different variations, and could be commissioned either with an automatic closing lid, or if desired, with a foot lever to open the lid automatically. The galvanised waste bins were particularly sturdy, had a swing-open lid with strong hinges, firm handles on both the lid and sides, and could also be fitted with an additional hanging hook.

=== Crates for breweries, dairies and spinning mills ===
The company also received several patents for various crates used by breweries (e.g. Dresdner Felsenkeller, Schlossbrauerei Chemnitz, Brauerei Riebeck), dairies (e.g. Genossenschaftsmolkerei Chemnitz, Molkerei Sofia Bulgaria) and spinning mills. As early as 1906, beer bottle crates were included in Rowac's product range, as can be seen in The Address Book of all Nations on Earth (Adressbuch aller Länder der Erde).

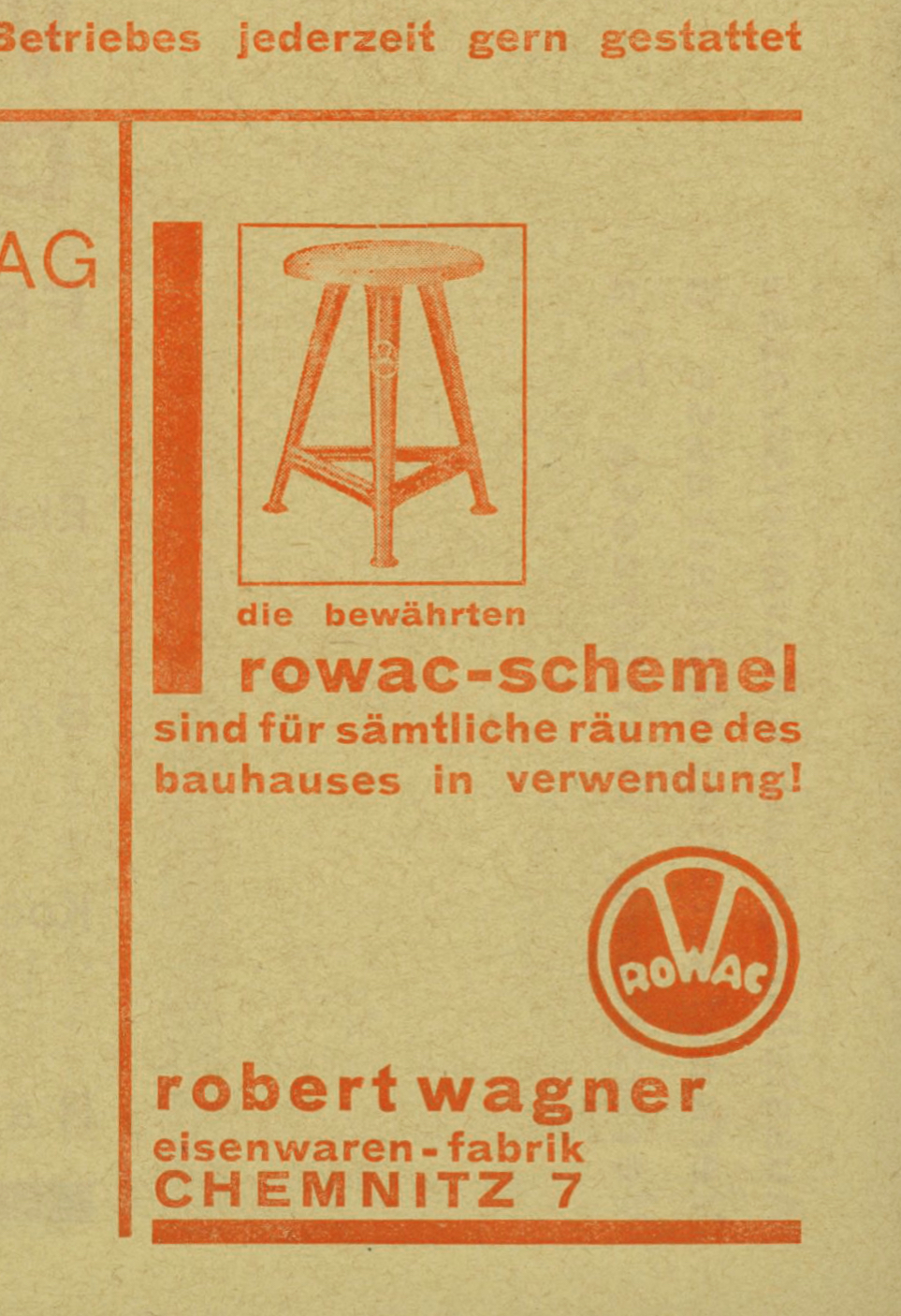
Rowac advertisement in a Bauhaus Dessau brochure – around 1927

== Rowac and the Bauhaus ==
The design of the Rowac stool represents the functionalist ideal advocated by the Bauhaus, among others, in Germany in the interwar period, in which practicality and utility were intended to be at the centre of aesthetic interest. From 1926 on, the stools found their way into the classrooms and workshops of what was probably the most influential art school of the new, modern style, the Bauhaus Dessau. The fact that Walter Gropius chose the Rowac stool, of all things, for the Bauhaus building is believed to be due to its technically refined yet simple construction. Rowac advertised its stool in a Bauhaus brochure as follows: "the tried and tested rowac stools are in use in all rooms of the bauhaus!" Photos from the Bauhaus archive show that Rowac stools were not only used as seating in the workshops, but also for all kinds of other activities in the Prellerhaus and by the in-house band (Die Bauhauskapelle).

== Use and practicality of metal furniture ==
In the middle of the 19th century, furniture production changed fundamentally with the progress of machine technology. As the ability to produce everyday goods on an industrial scale grew, so did the need for functional and durable factory furnishings. Rowac was not only one of the first companies to mass-produce industrial furniture, but was also the company that attracted particular recognition. Nevertheless, comparable products were also in widespread use in factories across Europe from the 1920s onwards. The purpose of this factory furniture was, for example, to prevent premature fatigue that would have resulted from standing for long periods of time, or to organise tools for space- and time-saving work. The choice of furniture depended on the particular workplace and its requirements, such as ensuring mobility. Therefore, back and armrests were only appropriate where they were shown to improve work performance. It was not until the 1930s, when the technical literature on ergonomics in the office workplace became concerned with improving work performance and preventing work-related posture problems through the use of special furniture, that height-adjustable stools and chairs with backrests became more and more common in the workplace. However, as previously stated, they were only used where it could be demonstrated that an improvement in work performance could be achieved or work-related postural damage could be avoided. Rowac also expanded its range and produced this technically more complex, material and cost-intensive option, after having opted for the more cost-effective solution in the early days, when it offered only stools in various heights. Tubular steel and metal furniture, such as toolboxes, filing cabinets and safes, lockers, shelves, tables and various seating furniture, were not only used in factories and industrial enterprises, but also became established in public institutions such as offices, schools, nursing homes and hospitals and in the food service industry.

== Patents ==
In the online archive of the German Patent and Trademark Office, numerous patents registered by the company can be found relating to details of various stools and chairs, but also other things such as bottle crates, spool crates and window fasteners. For example, in 1920 Rowac was granted two patents on "the attachment of steel stool legs", according to which the stool could be delivered – without loss of sturdiness – in a disassembled state and then using only screws, assembled directly at the planned site of use, thereby saving space and reducing shipping costs, especially when delivered in large quantities. However, it is questionable whether this solution was actually used in series production.
