= Allan Wagner (disambiguation) =

Topics referred to by the same term

Allan Wagner may refer to:

- Allan Wagner Tizón (born 1942), Peruvian diplomat
- Allan R. Wagner (1934–2018), American experimental psychologist and learning theorist

== See also ==
- Alan Wagner (1931–2007), American television executive, radio personality, writer, and critic
- Alan Wagner (golfer) (born 1989), Argentine professional golfer
