= Henry Wagner =

Henry Wagner may refer to:

- Henry F. Wagner (died 1943), American judge
- Henry Michell Wagner (1792–1870), Church of England clergyman
- Henry N. Wagner (1927–2012), professor in nuclear medicine
- Henry Raup Wagner (1862–1957), American book collector and bibliographer

== See also ==
- Henry Wagener (1891–1979), American businessman, farmer, and politician
