= Wagner's disease =

Medical condition of the eye

- Other names: Wagner’s hyaloid retinal degeneration, Wagner’s vitreoretinal degeneration, Wagner syndrome
- Wagner's disease is inherited in an autosomal dominant manner

Wagner's disease is a familial disease of the eye that can cause reduced visual acuity. Wagner's disease was originally described in 1938. This disorder was frequently confused with Stickler syndrome, but lacks the systemic features and high incidence of retinal detachments. Inheritance is autosomal dominant, and affects less than 1,000 people in the United States.

== Genetics ==
Wagner's syndrome has for a long time been considered a synonym for Stickler's syndrome. However, since the gene that is responsible for Wagner disease (and Erosive Vitreoretinopathie) is known (2005), the confusion has ended. For Wagner disease is the Versican gene (VCAN) located at 5q14.3 is responsible.

For Stickler there are 4 genes are known to cause this syndrome: COL2A1 (75% of Stickler cases), COL11A1 (also Marshall syndrome), COL11A2 (non-ocular Stickler) and COL9A1 (recessive Stickler).

The gene involved helps regulate how the body makes collagen, a sort of chemical glue that holds tissues together in many parts of the body. This particular collagen gene only becomes active in the jelly-like material that fills the eyeball; in Wagner's disease this "vitreous" jelly grabs too tightly to the already weak retina and pulls it away.

== Signs & Symptoms ==
The most common sign of the disease is sudden worsening of vision at young ages where it isn't normal, and without any obvious cause like trauma; onset of symptoms can vary a lot, but it's not unusual for symptoms to appear as young as two years. Specific symptoms include cataracs, atrophy of the choroid (connective tissues) & retina, glaucoma & increased intraocular pressure, myopia, optic nerve atrophy, lack of gel in the vitreous cavity, peripheral retinal detachment, loss of retinal pigmentation, visual field defects that often involve loss of peripheral vision, vitreoretinopathy leading to full detached retina, and overall loss of visual acuity especially with focusing on distant objects.

== Diagnosis ==
Diagnosis is based on fundus examination that reveals an empty vitreous with vitreoretinal degeneration in similar picture to Stickler's syndrome but with no systemic associations.

== Treatment ==
Most people with the disease need laser repairs to the retina, and about 60 per cent need further surgery to remove cataracts.

== History ==
In 1938 Hans Wagner described 13 members of a Canton of Zurich family with a peculiar lesion of the vitreous and retina. Ten additional affected members were observed by Boehringer et al. in 1960 and 5 more by Ricci in 1961. In the Netherlands Jansen in 1962 described 2 families with a total of 39 affected persons. Both families had only ocular features. Alexander and Shea in 1965 reported a family. In the last report, characteristic facies (epicanthus, broad sunken nasal bridge, receding chin) was noted. Genu valgum was present in all. In addition to typical changes in the vitreous, retinal detachment occurs in some and cataract is another complication.
