= George Wagoner =

George Wagoner could refer to:

- George Chester Robinson Wagoner (1863–1946), American politician
- Rick Wagoner (George Richard Wagoner Jr., born 1953), American businessman and former CEO of General Motors

== See also ==
- George Wagner (disambiguation)
