= Martin Wagner =

Martin Wagner may refer to:

- Martin Wagner (architect) (1885–1957), German architect
- Martin Wagner (artist) (born 1966), American artist and filmmaker, co-host of The Atheist Experience television show
- Martin Wagner (footballer, born 1968), German footballer
- Martin Wágner (born 1980), Czech photographer
- Martín Wagner (born 1985), Argentine footballer
- Martin Wagner (footballer, born 1986), German footballer
