= Guillermo Wagner (disambiguation) =

Guillermo Wagner may also refer to:

- Guillermo Wagner (1939–1993), Mexican basketball player
- Guillermo Wagner Granizo (1923–1995) American ceramic tile muralist in Northern California
