= Wagner (crater) =

Crater on Mercury

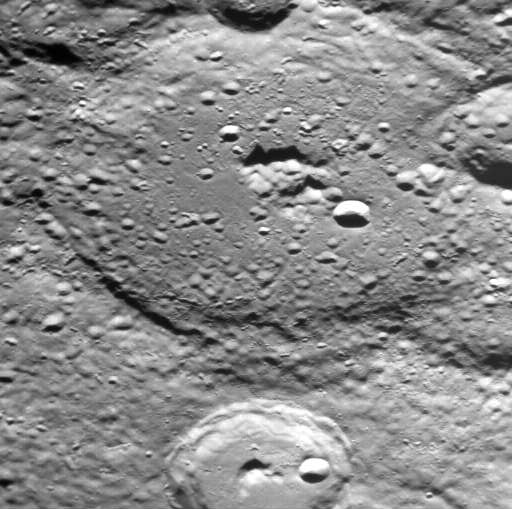
- MESSENGER NAC image
- Planet: Mercury
- Coordinates: 68.25°S 114.78°W
- Quadrangle: Bach
- Diameter: 134 km (83 mi)
- Eponym: Richard Wagner

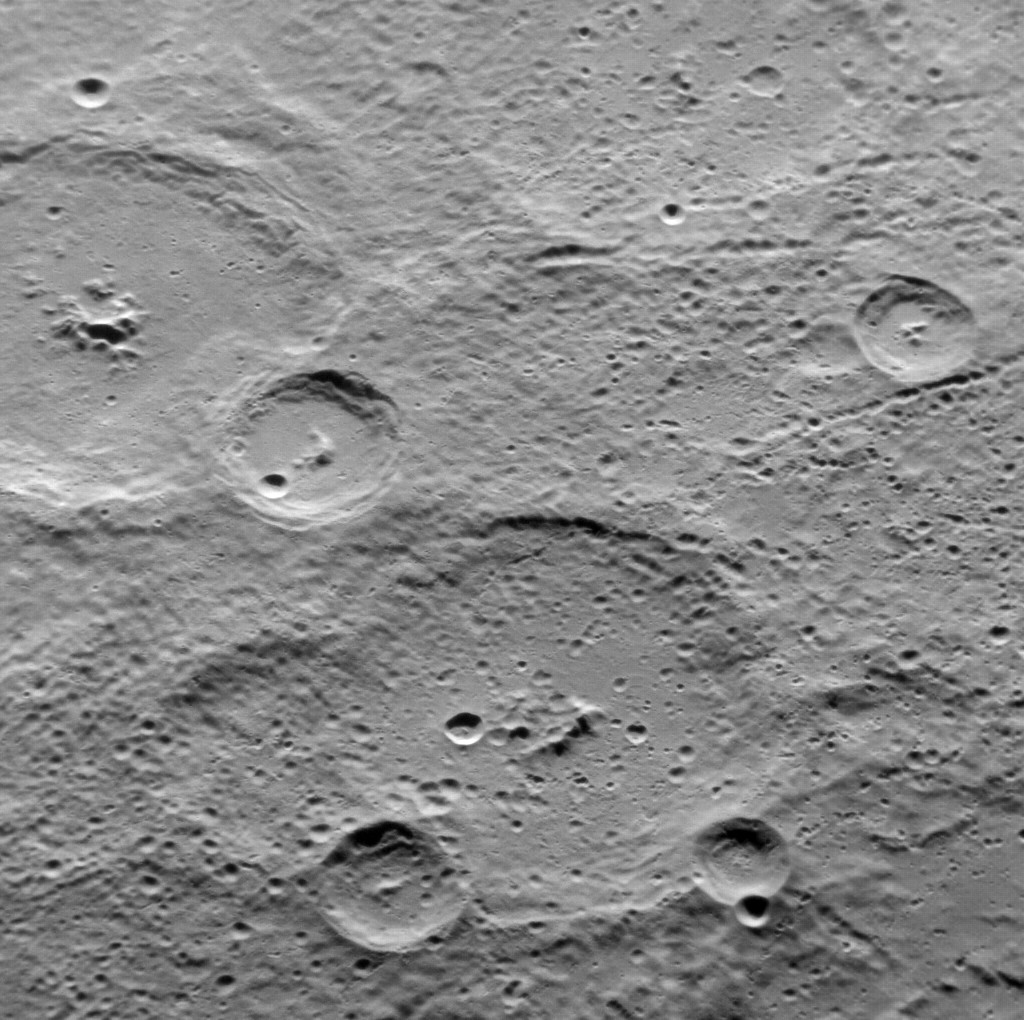
Wagner (bottom) and Chopin (upper right)

Wagner is an impact crater in the south polar region of the planet Mercury. It was named after the German composer Richard Wagner (1813–1883) in 1976, as recognized by the International Astronomical Union. The crater was first imaged by Mariner 10 in 1974.

Wagner is one of several craters on Mercury named after famous composers. Other examples include Brahms (after Johannes Brahms), Scarlatti (after Domenico Scarlatti), and Couperin (after Francois Couperin). A number of Mercurian craters are named after historic cultural figures from different fields, including literature, philosophy, and art, but others feature names from popular culture, including Walt Disney and Muddy Waters.

Wagner is located in the Bach quadrangle, between Bach and Chopin.
