= Joseph Wagner =

Joseph Wagner may refer to:

- Joseph Wagner (New York politician) (1853–1932), New York politician
- Joseph Wagner (engraver) (1706–1786), Austrian engraver
- Joseph Wagner (Massachusetts politician) (born 1960), Massachusetts politician
- Joseph Wagner (Wisconsin politician) (1809–1896), Wisconsin politician
- Joe Wagner (Joseph Bernard Wagner, 1889–1948), American baseball player

== See also ==
- Josef Wagner (disambiguation)
