= William Wagner =

William, Will, Bill, or Billy Wagner may refer to:

== Sports ==
- Bill Wagner (baseball) (1894–1951), American baseball catcher
- Billy Wagner (William Edward Wagner, born 1971), MLB pitcher
- Bull Wagner (William George Wagner, 1887–1967), pitcher in Major League Baseball
- Will Wagner (American football) American football player and coach
- Will Wagner (baseball) (William James Wagner, born 1998), MLB infielder, son of Billy Wagner
- William Wagner (long snapper) (born 2000), American football long snapper

== Others ==
- Bill Wagner (software), American software developer
- Bill Wagner III (1944–2012), Arizona politician
- George "Billy" Wagner III, suspect in the Pike County shootings
- Guillermo Wagner Granizo (1923–1995, Guillermo "Bill" Wagner Granizo), American ceramic tile artist
- Kenny Wagner (William Kenneth Wagner, 1903–1958), Mississippi bootlegger
- Stanley Wagner (winemaker) (Stanley "Bill" Wagner), early American vintner
- William Wagner (actor) (1883–1964), American character actor
- William Wagner (land surveyor) (1820–1901), Polish-born Canadian land surveyor
- William Wagner (philanthropist) (1796–1885), American philanthropist and natural history museum founder in Philadelphia
- William Wagner (physician) (1825–1872), German American physician and revolutionary
- William G. Wagner (1950–2021), Williams College faculty member and former interim president
- Wolfe Wagner (William Wolfe Wagner, died 1937), Irish Anglican clergyman
