= Hans Wagner =

Hans Wagner may refer to:

- Hans Wagner (entomologist) (1884–1949), German entomologist; see Trichapion
- Hans Wagner (general) (1896–1967), German World War II general
- Hans Wagner (medicine) (1905–1989), Swiss ophthalmologist
- Hans Wagner (sculptor) (1905–1982), German sculptor and painter
- Hans Wagner (ice hockey) (1923–2010), Austrian ice hockey player
- Hans Wagner (bobsleigh) (1949–2026), West German bobsledder
- Hans Wagner (politician) (1963–2026), Dutch politician and member of the House of Representatives, 2006
- Hans Wagner (type designer), German type designer for Ludwig & Mayer type foundry
- Hans Wagner, protagonist of the 1903 musical comedy The Prince of Pilsen

== See also ==
- Honus Wagner (1874–1955), baseball player and Hall of Fame shortstop
- Julius Wagner (nicknamed Hans, 1906–1960), American football and wrestling coach
