= Karl Wagner =

Karl Wagner is the name of:

- Karl Edward Wagner (1945–1994), American writer of fantasy stories
- Karl Wagner (bobsleigh) (1907–1959), Austrian bobsledder who competed in the early 1950s
- Karl Wagner (luger), German luger who competed in the 1920s
- Karl Willy Wagner (1883–1953), German pioneer in the theory of electronic filters

== See also ==
- Carl Wagner (disambiguation)
- Wagner (surname)
