= Gustav Wagner (doctor) =

Gustav Wagner (born 18 January 1918; died 16 September 2006) was a German doctor, a dermatologist and an expert in medical informatics.

== Biography ==
Wagner attended the Realgymnasium in Hanover, and studied medicine in Leipzig and Berlin.

In 1951, he established the first professional organisation for medical informatics in Germany (and among the first worldwide), the Gesellschaft fur Medizinische Dokumentation, Informatik und Statistik, initially as a subgroup of the Deutsche Gesellschaft für Dokumentation.

Also from 1951, he edited with Heinz-Egon Kleine-Natrop Schriftenreihe der Nordwestdeutschen Dermatologischen Gesellschaft.

In 1961, he was the senior physician in the Department of Dermatology at the Medical Center of the University of Kiel.

He was the first editor of the journal Methods of Information in Medicine (1962-5) and served as the journal's editor-in-chief for 26 years, through to 1988. He continued as a senior editor on the journal through to at least 2011.

Wagner also wrote articles on the history of medicine.

== Selected Publications ==
- with R. Thome: Dokumentation, Datenverarbeitung und Statistik in der Medizin. 1975; 2nd edition 1983.
- with S. Koller: Handbuch der medizinischen Dokumentation und Datenverarbeitung.
- with C. O. Köhler: Interaktive Datenverarbeitung in der Medizin. 1976.
- with O. Nacke: Dokumentation und Information im Dienste der Gesundheitspflege. 1976.
- with C. S. Muir: Directory of On-going Research in Cancer Epidemiology. 1976 ff. (annually).
- Laboratory Information System – Hospital Pharm. System. 1978.
- Tumor-Lokalisationsschlüssel. 2nd edition. 1979.
- with R. Frentzel-Beyme, R. Leutner & H. Wiebelt: Krebsatlas der Bundesrepublik Deutschland. 1979.
- with M. Blohmke & H. Schipperges: Medizinische Ökologie. 1979.
- with B. Spieß & Otto Scheibe: TNM-Atlas. 1982.
- with Ekkehard Grundmann: Basisdokumentation für Tumorkranke. 1983.
- with C. O. Köhler & P. Tautu: Der Beitrag der Informationsverarbeitung zum Fortschritt der Medizin. 1984.
- with N. Becker & R. Frentzel-Beyme: Krebsatlas für die Bundesrepublik Deutschland. 2nd edition. 1985.
- with H. J. Bochnik: Spielräume. 1985.
