= Wagner Neto =

Brazilian politician (born 1991)

Member of the Legislative Assembly of Goiás
- Incumbent
- Assumed office 1 January 2019

Personal details
- Born: 19 April 1991 (age 34)
- Party: Solidarity (since 2023)

Wagner Camargo Neto (born 19 April 1991) is a Brazilian politician serving as a member of the Legislative Assembly of Goiás since 2019. He previously served as deputy mayor of Itapuranga.
