= Steve Wagner =

Stephen, Steven, or Steve Wagner may refer to:

- Stephen Wagner (born 1977), Canadian ice hockey goaltender
- Steve Wagner (American football) (born 1954), NFL football defensive back
- Steve Wagner (field hockey) (born 1967), American Olympic field hockey goalkeeper
- Steve Wagner (ice hockey) (born 1984), American ice hockey defenceman
- Steve Wagner (brewer), American brewer and founder of Stone Brewing Co.
