= Dr. Wagner (disambiguation) =

Dr. Wagner (1936–2004) was a Mexican wrestler.

Dr. Wagner may also refer to:

- Dr. Wagner Jr. (born 1965), Mexican wrestler
- El Hijo de Dr. Wagner Jr. (born 1991), Mexican wrestler
