= Andreas Wagner (disambiguation) =

Andreas Wagner (born 1967) is an Austrian-American evolutionary biologist.

Andreas Wagner may also refer to:

- Andreas Wagner (politician) (born 1972), German politician
- Johann Andreas Wagner (1797–1861), German palaeontologist, zoologist and archaeologist
