= Moritz Wagner =

Moritz Wagner may refer to:

- Moritz Wagner (basketball) (born 1997), German professional basketball player
- Moritz Wagner (naturalist) (1813–1887), German explorer, naturalist and geographer
