= Daniel Wagner =

Daniel, Dan or Danny Wagner may refer to:

- Daniel Wagner (footballer) (born 1987), German association football goalkeeper
- Daniel Wagner (parathlete) (born 1993), Danish Paralympic athlete
- Daniel Wagner (actor) (born 1980), German actor in Die Kunst des Krieges
- Dan Wagner (data scientist), American political consultant
- Dan Wagner (born 1963), British Internet entrepreneur
- Danny Wagner (1922–1997), American basketball player
- Danny Wagner (politician), West Virginia state legislator
- Danny Wagner (musician) (born 1998), drummer for rock band Greta Van Fleet
