= Thomas Wagner =

Thomas Wagner may refer to:

- Tom Wagner (politician), Delaware state auditor
- Tom Wagner (financier), (born 1969) co-founder and co-CEO of Knighthead Capital Management
- Thomas Wagner (designer) (born 1977), German video game designer
- Thomas Wagner (footballer) (born 1976), Austrian football striker
- Thomas Wagner (writer), American television writer and producer
- Thomas M. Wagner (c. 1824–1862), Confederate Army officer

== See also ==
- Thomas Wagoner (born 1942), American politician and businessman
