= Dennis Wagner =

Topics referred to by the same term

Dennis Wagner may refer to:

- Dennis Wagner (American football) (born 1958), American football coach
- Dennis Wagner (chess player) (born 1997), German chess grandmaster
