= Mathias Wagner =

German politician (born 1974)

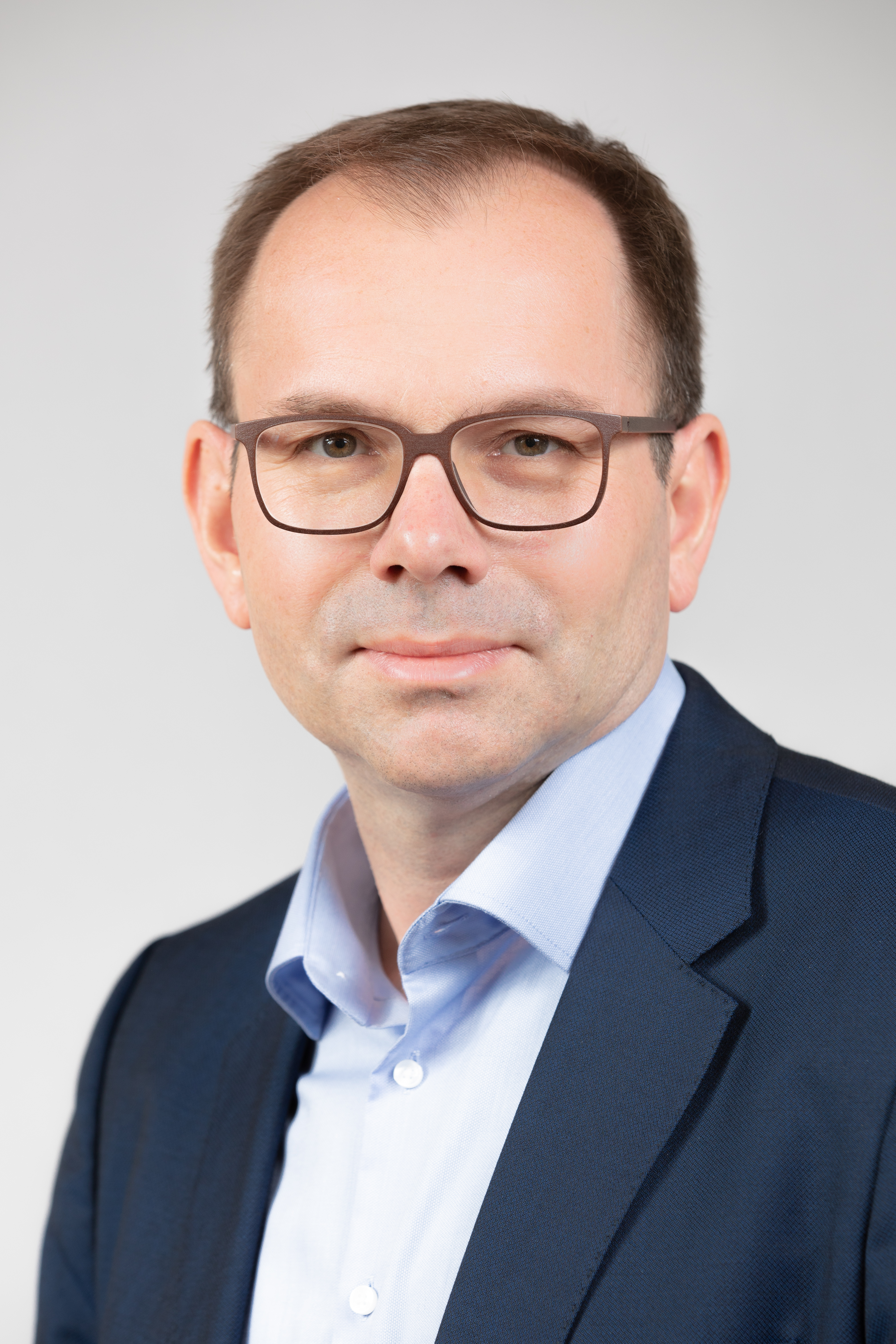
- Wagner in 2019

Member of the Landtag of Hesse
- Incumbent
- Assumed office 5 April 2003

Personal details
- Born: 29 March 1974 (age 52) Frankfurt am Main
- Party: Alliance 90/The Greens (since 1995)

Mathias Wagner (born 29 March 1974 in Frankfurt am Main) is a German politician serving as a member of the Landtag of Hesse since 2003. He has served as group leader of Alliance 90/The Greens since 2014.
