= Josef Wagner =

Josef Wagner may refer to:

- Josef Wagner (composer) (1856–1908), Austrian composer
- Josef Wagner (cyclist) (1916–2003), Swiss cyclist
- Josef Wagner (Gauleiter) (1899–1945), Nazi official in the Third Reich
- Josef Wagner the Younger (1901–1957), Czech painter and sculptor
- Josef Wagner (painter) (born 1938), Czech painter and graphic artist
- Josef Wagner (water polo) (1886-?), Austrian Olympic water polo player

== See also ==
- Joseph Wagner (disambiguation)
