= Richard K. Wagner =

American psychologist

- Other name: Rick Wagner

Academic background
- Education: University of Akron; Yale University

Academic work
- Discipline: Psychology
- Institutions: Florida State University

Richard K. Wagner is an American psychologist, having been the Alfred Binet Professor at Florida State University.
