= Clara Wagner =

Pioneering female motorcyclists (1891–1961)

Clara Marian Wagner
- Born: November 11, 1891; St Paul, Ramsay County, Minnesota
- Died: December 30, 1961 (aged 70); Cathedral City, Riverside County, California
- Known for: Pioneer female motorcyclist and racer

Clara Marian Wagner (11 November 1891 – 30 December 1961) was one of the first documented women motorcyclists, who became notable as an endurance racer and was sponsored by the Eclipse Machine Co., a bicycle company, for using its braking products.

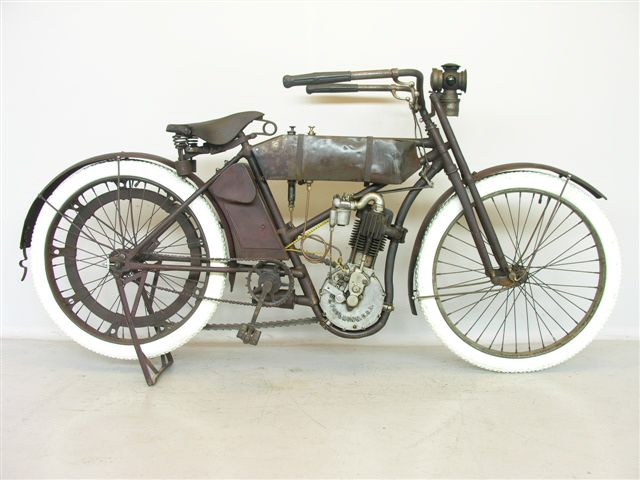
Wagner motorcycle, 1911 model

In 1907, Wagner, 15 years old and the daughter of the Wagner Motorcycle Company (1901-1914 ) owner George Wagner from Saint Paul, Minnesota, became a member of the American Federation of Motorcyclists (FAM).

Clara Wagner put the company's motorcycles on the map by achieving a perfect score in a FAM 360-mile endurance race from Chicago to Indianapolis in 1910, aged 18,, but was denied the trophy because she was female. She won several such events.

At the time, Wagner was celebrated on a series of postcards as "The most successful and experienced lady motorcyclist" and rode one of the first motorcycles designed specifically for women.
