= Jack Wagner =

Jack Wagner may refer to:

- Jack Wagner (screenwriter) (1891–1963), American screenwriter and cinematographer
- Jack Wagner (announcer) (1925–1995), announcer for Disney theme parks
- Jack Wagner (politician) (born 1948), former Auditor General of Pennsylvania
- Jack Wagner (actor) (born 1959), actor and singer
- Jack Wagner (podcaster) (born 1989), host of Yeah, But Still

== See also ==
- John Wagner (disambiguation)
- Jack Wrangler (1946–2009), American actor
