= Walter Wagner =

Walter Wagner may refer to:

- Walter Wagner (footballer) (born 1949), German soccer player
- Walter Wagner (notary) (1907–1945), notary who married Adolf Hitler and Eva Braun

== See also ==
- Walt Wagner, American pianist, composer, and arranger
- Walter Wanger (1894–1968), American film producer
