= Henry N. Wagner =

Henry N. Wagner (1927–2012), a former professor at Johns Hopkins University, is one of the pioneering researchers in nuclear medicine.
