= Florence Wagner (disambiguation) =

Florence Wagner may also refer to:

- Florence Wagner (1883–1971), American screenwriter
- Florence Signaigo Wagner (1919–2019), American botanist who served as president of the American Fern Society
