= Johann Wagner (disambiguation) =

Johann Wagner may refer to:

- Johann Wagner (footballer) (born 1990), Australian rules footballer
- Johann Peter Alexander Wagner (1730–1809), German rococo sculptor
- Johann Andreas Wagner (1797–1861), German zoologist
- Johann Philipp Wagner (1799-1879), German merchant and inventor

== See also ==
- John Wagner (disambiguation)
