= Chopin (crater) =

Crater on Mercury

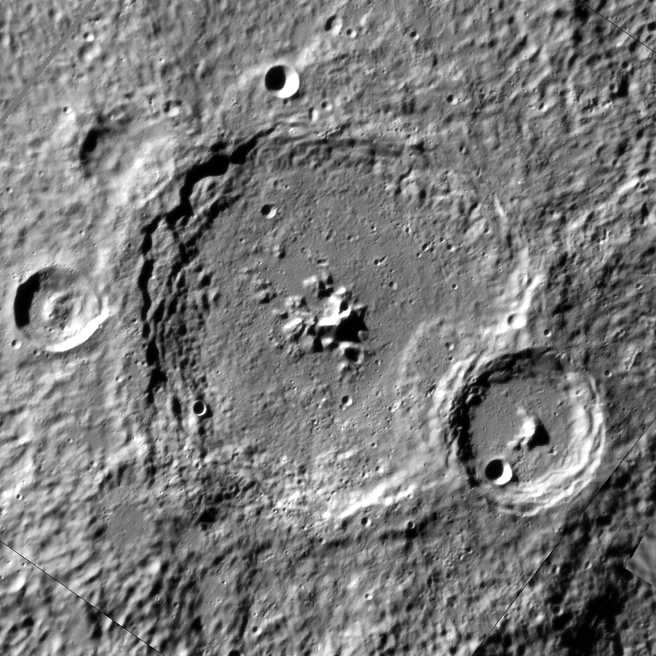
- Mosaic of photos by MESSENGER centered on Chopin
- Feature type: Central-peak impact crater
- Location: Michelangelo quadrangle, Mercury
- Coordinates: 65.45°S 123.40°W
- Diameter: 131 km (81 mi)
- Eponym: Frédéric Chopin

Chopin is a crater on Mercury. It has a diameter of 131 kilometers. Chopin is named for the Polish composer Frédéric Chopin (lived 1810–49). Its name was adopted by the International Astronomical Union in 1976. The crater was first imaged by Mariner 10 in 1974.

== Links ==
- Spudis P. D., Prosser J. G. (1984). "Geologic Map of the Michelangelo Quadrangle of Mercury". U.S. Geological Survey.
- Maps of the region with current names of surface features: northern part, southern part
