= Michael Wagner =

Michael Wagner may refer to:

== Sports ==
- Michael Wagner (footballer, born 1975), Austrian footballer
- Michael Wagner (footballer, born 2000), German footballer
- Mike Wagner (1949–2026), American football player

== Others ==
- Michael Wagner (writer) (1947–1992), television writer and producer
- Michael J. Wagner (1941–2014), American politician and businessman
- Mike Wagner (musician) (born 1975), American musician and producer
