= John D. Wagner =

American author and businessman

- Occupations: Author; businessman
- Title: Managing director, 1stWEST Mergers & Acquisitions

John D. Wagner is an American author and businessman active in the lumber and building materials and corporate finance sectors.

== Career ==
Wagner has contributed articles and opinion pieces to trade publications within the construction and building materials industry, including the LBM Journal and the Journal of Light Construction. Articles written by Wagner have appeared in The New York Times, the Los Angeles Times, and the Chicago Tribune.

In addition to business and construction writing, Wagner has published fiction, including the 2011 middle grade novel The Crash Crystal: A Lego Mystery. His poetry collections include Fake Cities (2016) and The Kallima Butterfly (2022).

Wagner has served as an instructor at several institutions, including the University of Alabama and Norwich University. Since 2011, he has been the chief marketing officer of Wagner Media. In 2015, he became a managing director focusing on the LBM sector for 1stWest M&A.

== Bibliography ==
=== Authored books ===
- Building a Multi-Use Barn. Williamson Press. 1994. ISBN 9780913589854.
- Building Adirondack Furniture: The Art, the History, and the How-To. Williamson Press. 1995. ISBN 9780913589878.
- The Builders' Revolution. Sun Forest Systems. 1996. ISBN 9780964933903.
- Mission Furniture You Can Build. Houghton Mifflin. 1997. ISBN 9781576300404.
- House Framing. Creative Homeowner Press. 1998. ISBN 9781880029985.
- Drywall: Pro Tips for Hanging and Finishing. Creative Homeowner Press. 2000. ISBN 9781580110679.
- The Interactive Marketplace: Business-to-Business Strategies for Delivering Just-in-Time, Mass-Customized Products. McGraw Hill. 2001. ISBN 9780071363433.
- Ultimate Guide to Barns, Sheds and Outbuildings: Plan, Design, Build. Creative Homeowner Press. 2005. ISBN 9781580112369.
- The Ultimate Guide to Yard and Garden Sheds: Plan, Design, Build. Creative Homeowner Press. 2006. ISBN 9781580112802.
- Smart Guide: Painting: Interior and Exterior Painting Step by Step. Creative Homeowner Press. 2008. ISBN 9781580114233.
- Green Remodeling: Your Start toward an Eco-Friendly Home. Creative Homeowner Press. 2008. ISBN 9781580113960.
- Smart Guide: Sheds: Step-by-Step Projects (Home Improvement). Creative Homeowner Press. 2009. ISBN 9781580114394.
- The Crash Crystal: A Lego Mystery. Self-published. 2011. ISBN 9781468079449.
- Fake Cities: Poems by John D. Wagner. Ex Ophidia Press. 2016. ISBN 9781519151674.
- M&A Basics for People in a Hurry!: Key Deal Elements and Common Practices of Mergers and Acquisitions. 1StWest MA Press. 2018. ISBN 9781981551750.
- M&A Basics For Cannabis & Hemp Companies: A Company Owner's Guide to Key Deal Elements & Common Practices of Mergers & Acquisitions. 1StWest MA Press. 2019. ISBN 9781795527972.
- M&A Basics For Craft Beer & Spirit Companies: A Company Owner's Guide to Key Deal Elements & Common Practices of Mergers & Acquisitions. 1StWest MA Press. 2019. ISBN 9781090994097.
- M&A Basics For People in a (BIG) Hurry: Master the Latest Methods for Getting Top Dollar for Your Business. 1StWest MA Press. 2021. ISBN 9780578952871.
- The Kallima Butterfly. Plain Wrapper Press. 2022. ISBN 9798985089905.
- Wagner, Asa S.; Wagner, John D. (2023). Kick the World, Break Your Foot: applying the wisdom of Asian aphorisms to your everyday life and business life. The Conrad Press. ISBN 9781915494221.
- FINDINGS: Wood, Cacti & Sand; Photographs by John D. Wagner. Mexico City: MORG Press. 2023.
- Wagner, John D. (2024). Give Him Light, a Two-Act Play. KDP. ISBN 979-8879220636.
- Wagner, John D. (2026). Don’t Leave Millions on the Table!: The Lumber and Building Material Retailer's Guide to Selling Your Business. 1stWest M&A Press. ISBN 979-8189754258.

=== As editor, rewrite editor or contributing editor ===
- Advanced Framing: Techniques, Troubleshooting & Structural Design. Journal of Light Construction. 1992. ISBN 9780963226808.
- Essential Home Tips: 500 Solutions for Problems Around Your Home. Today's Homeowner. 1998. ISBN 9780517221471.
- Around the Yard: 750 Essential Tips & Projects for Your Landscape. Today's Homeowner. 1999. ISBN 9780865736344.
- Ultimate Guide to Home Repair & Improvement (Creative Homeowner Ultimate Guide to Home Repair and Improvement). Creative Homeowner Press. 2006. ISBN 9781580113168.
- Donegan, Fran J. (2007). No-Fear Home Improvement: 100 Projects Anyone Can Do (Creative Homeowner). ISBN 9781580113687.
- Richard "McCarthy" Coyle (2015). The Cherry Tree Is Blossoming: Selected Letters, Poems, Journals, Fictions, and Dramas. Self-published. ISBN 9781512239898.

=== Chapter contributions ===
- Burton, Ken, ed. (1995). "Heating and Cooling". Adding on: How to Design and Build the Perfect Addition for Your Home. Emmaus, Pennsylvania: Rodale Press. St. Martin's Press. ISBN 9780875966052.
- Mack, Daniel (2008). The Adirondack Chair: A Celebration of a Summer Classic. Harry N. Abrams, Inc. ISBN 9781584795681.
