= Carl Robert Wagner =

German entrepreneur and draftsman (1859–1931)

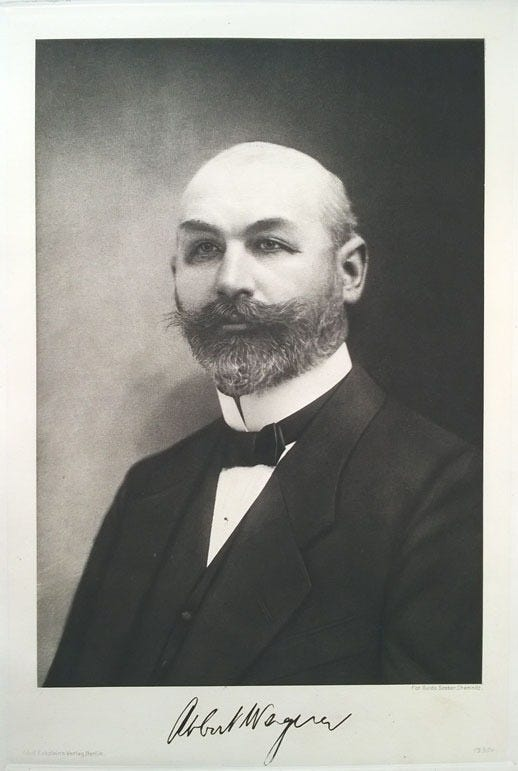
- Carl Robert Wagner
- Born: 31 January 1859; Chemnitz, Kingdom of Saxony
- Died: 25 July 1931 (aged 72); Dresden
- Occupation: Entrepreneur

Carl Robert Wagner (January 31 1859 – July 25 1931) was a German entrepreneur and draftsman. As founder of the company Rowac, he was responsible for bringing the first industrially produced steel stool to market.

== Early life ==
Carl Robert Wagner was born in Chemnitz, Kingdom of Saxony, on January 31, 1859.

== Career ==
After successfully completing his apprenticeship in metalworking, Wagner travelled through Germany, Austria, Italy and Switzerland as a journeyman from 1874 to 1879 and acquired not only technical know-how, but also an enormous amount of self-dependence.

After completing his military service in Dresden, he worked first as a metalworker in a machine factory in Chemnitz and from 1885 as a machine technician for the Sächsische Maschinenfabrik. He turned down an offer to work as a foreman in the spinning department of the Wiedesche Maschinenfabrik. Instead, he became self-employed in 1888 and founded the company Rowac.

== Death ==
He died in Dresden, Germany on July 25 1931. His son, Kurt Robert Wagner, and two grandsons, Hans Kurt Wagner and Werner Alexander Wagner, took over management of the company.
