= Wolfgang Wagner (disambiguation) =

Wolfgang Wagner (1919–2010) was a German opera festival director and younger brother of Wieland Wagner.

Wolfgang Wagner may also refer to:

- Wolfgang Wagner (swimmer) (born 1938), German Olympic swimmer
- Wolfgang Wagner (social psychologist), Austrian social psychologist
