= Lindsay Wagner (disambiguation) =

Lindsay Wagner (born 1949) is an American actress.

Lindsay Wagner may also refer to:

- Lindsay Peoples Wagner (born 1990), American journalist and editor
- Lindsay Wagner (model) (born 1988), American model and Playboy's Playmate for November 2007
