= Kurt Wagner =

Kurt Wagner may refer to:

- Kurt Wagner (actor) (1953–2023), German actor
- Kurt Wagner (general) (1904–1989), German general and politician
- Kurt Wagner (musician) (born 1959), American musician
- Kurt Wagner (comics), also known as Nightcrawler, a Marvel comic book superhero
