= Gerhard Wagner =

Gerhard Wagner may refer to:

- Gerhard Maria Wagner (born 1954), Austrian priest, gave up appointment as auxiliary bishop of Linz
- Gerhard Wagner (admiral) (1898–1987), naval officer
- Gerhard Wagner (physician) (1888–1939), leader of the Reich Physicians' Chamber
- Gerhard Wagner (physicist), German-American physicist
