= Robin Wagner =

Robin Wagner may refer to:

- Robin Wagner (figure skater) (born 1957), American figure skating coach
- Robin Wagner (designer) (1933−2023), American scenic designer
- Robin Wagner (cyclist) (born 1993), Czech cyclist
