= Robert Wagner (disambiguation) =

Robert Wagner (born 1930) is an American actor.

Robert, Rob, or Bob Wagner may also refer to:

== Law and politics ==
- Robert F. Wagner (1877–1953), U.S. Senator (D-NY), author Wagner Act enabling labor unions
- Robert F. Wagner Jr. (1910–1991), New York City mayor (1954–1965)
- Robert F. Wagner Jr. (deputy mayor) (1944–1993), New York City deputy mayor
- Robert Heinrich Wagner (1895–1946), Nazi Gauleiter and Reich Governor of Alsace
- Rob Wagner (politician) (born 1973), Democratic politician from Oregon

== Science and medicine ==
- Robert R. Wagner (1923–2001), American virologist
- Robert P. Wagner (1918–2004), American professor of genetics
- Robert Wagner (chemist), industrial chemist and S.D. and Gestapo officer

== Sports ==
- Bob Wagner (1947–2023), head football coach at the University of Hawaii, 1988–1995
- Robert Wagner (darts player) (born 1965), darts player from Norway
- Robert Wagner (cyclist) (born 1983), German professional cyclist
- Robert Wagner (footballer) (born 2003), German association football midfielder

== Others ==
- Robert T. Wagner (1932–2011), president of South Dakota State University, 1985–1997
- Tom Wagner (politician) (Robert Thomas Wagner Jr.), state auditor of Delaware
- Robert Wagner (serial killer) (born 1971), Australian serial killer convicted of 10 murders as part of the Snowtown murders
- Rob Wagner (publisher) (1872–1942), editor and publisher of Script, a weekly literary film magazine
- Rob L. Wagner (born 1954), American journalist covering Middle East issues

== See also ==
- Robert F. Wagner Jr. Institute For Arts & Technology, in Long Island City, Queens
- Robert Wagner House, listed on the National Register of Historic Places, in Illinois
