= Wagner Lake =

Lake in the state of Minnesota, United States

- Location within Minnesota
- Location: Wright County, Minnesota
- Coordinates: 45°9′7″N 93°43′13″W
- Type: lake

Wagner Lake is a lake in Wright County, in the U.S. state of Minnesota.

Wagner Lake was named for an early settler.

== See also ==
- List of lakes in Minnesota
