= Vagner =

Vagner or Vágner is both a masculine given name and a surname. It is a version of the Germanic surname Wagner. Notable people with the name include:

== Given name ==
- Vágner Bacharel (1954–1990), Brazilian footballer
- Vágner Benazzi (born 1954), Brazilian footballer and manager
- Vagner Gonçalves (Brazilian footballer) (born 1996)
- Vagner Gonçalves (Cape Verdean footballer) (born 1996)
- Vágner Mancini (born 1966), Brazilian footballer and manager
- Vágner (footballer, born 1973), full name Vágner Rogério Nunes, Brazilian football midfielder
- Vagner (footballer, born 1978), full name Vagner da Silva Sarti, Brazilian football midfielder
- Vagner Luís (born 1980), Brazilian footballer
- Vágner Kaetano Pereira (born 1980), Russian futsal player
- Vagner Rocha (born 1982), Brazilian mixed martial artist
- Vagner da Silva Noronha (born 1984), Brazilian long-distance runner
- Vágner (footballer, born 1983), full name Rafael Vágner Dias Silva, Brazilian football centre-back
- Vágner Love (born 1984), Brazilian footballer
- Vagner (footballer, born 1986), full name Vagner da Silva, Brazilian football goalkeeper
- Vagner (footballer, born 1987), full name Vagner Pereira Costa, Brazilian football midfielder
- Vagner (footballer, born 1989), full name Vagner Antônio Brandalise, Brazilian football goalkeeper

== Surname ==
- Alexandru Vagner (1989–2022), Romanian footballer
- Enzo Vagner (born 2006), Brazilian footballer
- Ivan Vagner (born 1985), Russian engineer and cosmonaut
- Jakub Vágner (born 1981), Czech television presenter and angler
- Jindřich Vágner (born 1943), Czech swimmer
- Josef Vágner (1928–2000), Czech zoologist, tropical forester, author and director
- László Vágner (born 1955), Hungarian football referee
- Martin Vagner (born 1984), Czech ice hockey player
- Matyáš Vágner (born 2003), Czech professional footballer
- Robert Vágner (born 1974), Czech footballer
- Yana Vagner (born 1973), Russian writer and journalist
- Yegor Yegorovich Vagner (1849–1903), Russian organic chemist

== See also ==
- Wagner (surname)
