= Hans Wagner (medicine) =

Hans Wagner (born Zurich, Switzerland; 1905-1989) was an ophthalmologist, and was the first to describe people who suffered from degenerative hyaloidea-retinalis hereditaria. L. Jansen, a Dutch ophthalmologist, suggested in 1966 that the disease be named after his Swiss colleague.
