= Wagner Motorcycle Company =

Defunct American motor vehicle manufacturer

- Founded: 1901
- Founder: George Wagner
- Headquarters: St Paul, Minnesota, USA
- Key people: Clara Wagner (racer)
- Products: Motorcycles

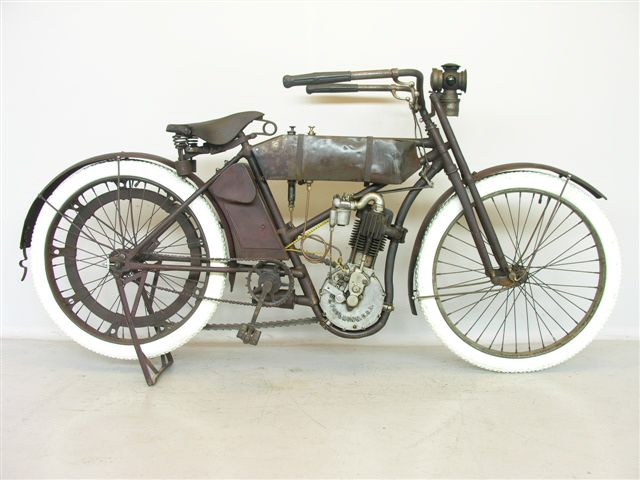
Wagner motorcycle, 1911 model

The Wagner Motorcycle Company (1901–1914) was established in Saint Paul, Minnesota, by George Wagner as an offshoot of the former Wagner Bicycle Company. It produced approximately 8,500 Wagner motorcycles and was one of the first manufacturers to position the engine low down, using a "loop frame" at a time when most companies were producing high-engined Indian clones.

The push rod engines ranged in size from 15 cubic inches in 1904 to 29 cubic inches by 1911, had a suction intake valve and were driven by a V-belt. The vehicles had many unique features not found in other motorcycles of its time, for example, using the loop frame as part of the exhaust system. Prices ranged from $175 to $210. The highly curved frames had brazed bronze fittings and early models had front baskets fitted.

== Women's model ==
In 1909, it produced a women's "drop frame" model which brought the company to national renown in the hands of Wagner's daughter Clara, one of the world's first documented woman motorcyclists.

== End of production ==
By 1914, sales had decreased dramatically, so Wagner sold the company to the Motorcycle Accessories Company.

== Bibliography ==
- Winkowski, Fred. 100 Motorcycles 100 Years: The First Century of the Motorcycle. Richard E. Mancini Book Sales, 2003.
