= Guillermo Wagner Granizo =

Ceramic tile muralist (1923–1995)

- Born: William Joseph Wagner; March 11, 1923; San Francisco, California, U.S.
- Died: November 1995; Benicia, California, U.S.
- Other name: Bill Wagner Granizo
- Years active: 1960–1995
- Known for: Ceramic tile murals
- Spouses: Amalia Mary Castillo, Lark Lucas
- Children: 2
- Website: https://www.granizoart.com/

Guillermo "Bill" Wagner Granizo (né William Joseph Wagner; March 11, 1923 – November 1995) is an American artist, known for his brightly colored ceramic tile murals which often featured historical or autobiographical references. He was active in Northern California from 1960 to 1995, and lived in San Francisco, Ben Lomond, San Jose, and Benicia.

== Early life and education ==
Guillermo Wagner Granizo was named William Joseph Wagner at birth, he was born in San Francisco, California on March 11, 1923. His mother Dora Granizo was Nicaraguan, and his father Joseph Wagner was of German descent and from the East Coast. Granizo lived in Guatemala and Nicaragua for eleven years in childhood. Upon returning to San Francisco he attended St. Dominic’s School in the Western Addition neighborhood, and High School of Commerce.

He served in the United States Army during World War II and was injured on Utah Beach during D-Day. After the war, Granizo attended San Francisco College of Art (later known as San Francisco Art Institute) for a year, although some sources state he graduated in 1949.

== Career ==
Granizo worked as an art director at KRON-TV, a television station in the San Francisco Bay Area in the 1950s, and later worked on directing educational films.

He started doing ceramic tile murals in 1970, and at that time he changed his name to Guillermo Wagner Granizo. He worked with the Stonelight Tile Company of San Jose for many years. His works are made of brightly colored ceramic tiles, and feature bold geometric shapes and abstract characters. He would often sign his work "BWG".

== Personal life ==
After World War II, Granizo married Amalia Mary "Mollie" Castillo, from a prominent Guatemala family. They had two sons, and divorced in the early 1970s.

Granizo's second marriage was to artist Lark Lucas, and they lived in Ben Lomond, California. The couple separated in 1984, and Granizo moved to San Jose, California to be closer to the tile factory. Granizo moved to Benicia, California in 1980 and resided there until his death in 1995. He died in November 1995 in Benicia, from cancer.

== Public art work ==
This is a select list of notable public artwork created by Granizo, and listed by year of creation.

Year	Title and/or description	Artist(s)	Material(s)	Dimensions	Location	Notes
1962	Eight indoor murals	Guillermo Wagner Granizo	Ceramic tile mural		San Francisco Academy of Sciences and the Steinhart Aquarium (now California Academy of Sciences), San Francisco, California	
1980	"Cathedral of Man"	Guillermo Wagner Granizo	Ceramic tile mural	Spans multiple walls and ceiling	Institute for Scientific Information (ISI), on the 3rd floor landing, 3501 Market St, Philadelphia, Pennsylvania	
1981	"A Gift of Appreciation to this Area", one mural	Guillermo Wagner Granizo	Ceramic tile mural	4-foot by 12-foot mural	Santa Cruz Civic Auditorium, 307 Church St, Santa Cruz, California	Mural depicts past events that have been held at that location.
1984	"Monterey Mural", one outdoor mural	Guillermo Wagner Granizo	Ceramic tile mural	11-foot by 45-foot mural	Monterey Conference Center, 1 Portola Plaza, Monterey, California	Mural depicts 150 scenes of history of the city of Monterey including the Rumsiens, Spanish colonists, and Mexican farmers. In 1983, the city of Monterey commissioned a 11-foot- by 45-foot tile mural, depicting the history of the city, which was completed a year later in 1984. From 2015 until 2018 the Monterey mural was removed and placed in storage, for restoration and a remodel of the building that housed it.
1984	Four outdoor murals	Guillermo Wagner Granizo, Lark Lucas	Ceramic tile mural	each mural is 7-foot by 13-foot mural	Institute for Scientific Information (ISI), in the Caring Center playground, 3501 Market St, Philadelphia, Pennsylvania	
1984	One outdoor mural	Guillermo Wagner Granizo	Ceramic tile mural		Mission Dolores, courtyard, San Francisco, California	Mural depicts the arrival of the San Carlos ship in the San Francisco Bay.
1984	“Olympic Fantasy,” one outdoor mural	Guillermo Wagner Granizo	Ceramic tile mural	93-foot by 24-foot mural	California State University, Los Angeles (CalState LA), Physical Education building, Los Angeles, California	The mural was restored in 2010.
1984	"Sausalito"	Guillermo Wagner Granizo	Ceramic tile mural	7-foot by 9 foot mural	Private owner, Woodside, California	Sold at auction the Sausalito Art Festival in 1984. In 2022, parts of this mural were found in a parking lot with 11 missing pieces.
1989	"Lighthouse Fantasy", four indoor murals	Guillermo Wagner Granizo	Ceramic tile mural		El Faro restaurant, 2399 Folsom Street, San Francisco, California	These murals hang on the upper level of two walls and depict happy people in San Francisco, with many party balloons, hot air balloons, the ocean, a light house, and more.
1992–1995	"Vacaville Centennial", twenty outdoor murals, set into three freestanding walls	Guillermo Wagner Granizo	Ceramic tile mural		Vacaville Civic Center, 650 Merchant St, Vacaville, California	Murals depict the city of Vacaville history.
1995	"Pleasanton Centennial"	Guillermo Wagner Granizo	Ceramic tile murals on three columns		At Bernal Avenue and Main Street in Civic Park, Pleasanton, California	Murals depict the Pleasanton Fairgrounds, local agriculture, the Ohlone people, and the railroad.
