= Martin Wágner =

Czech photographer (born 1980)

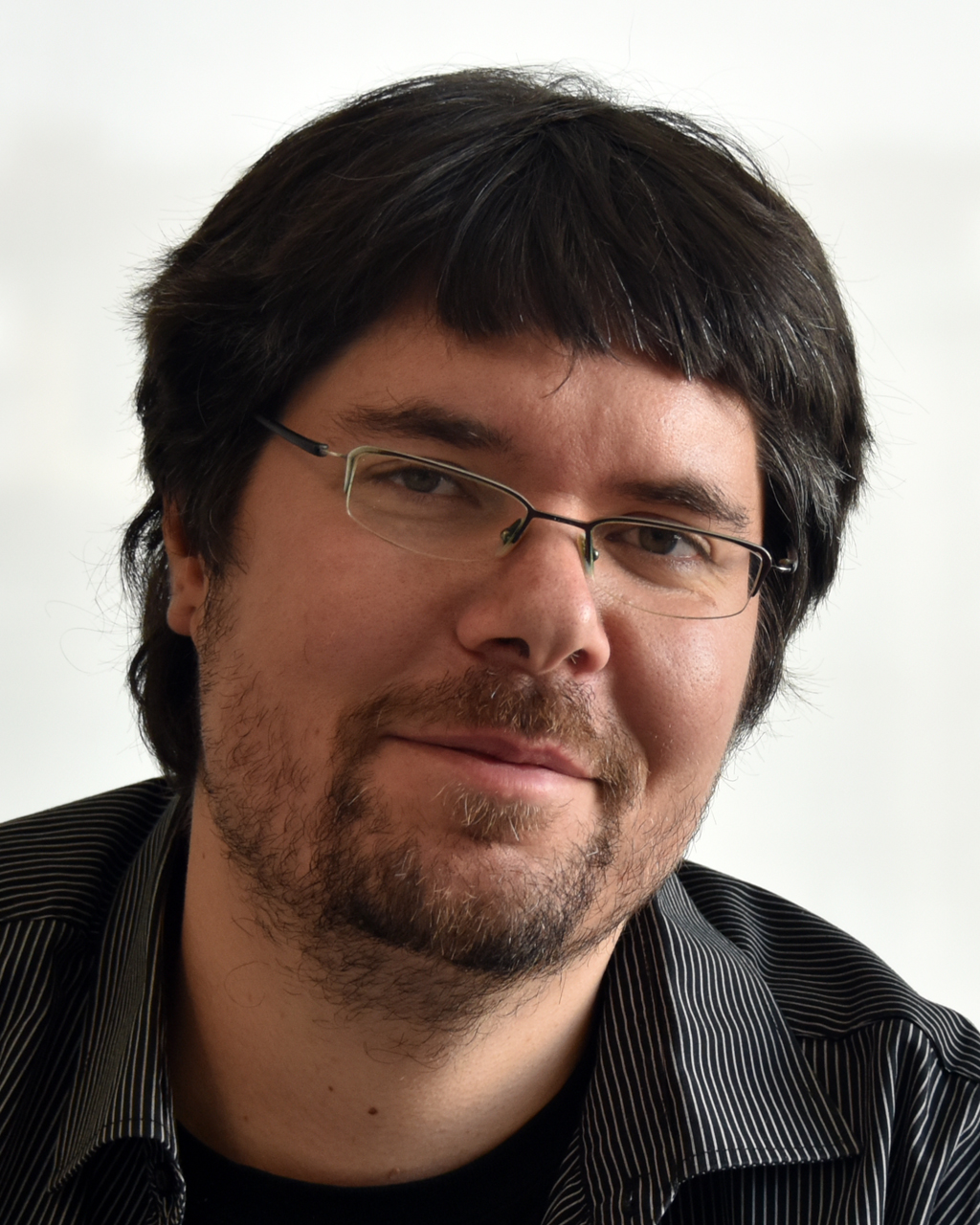
Martin Wágner (2019)

Martin Wágner (born 14 June 1980 in Prague, Czechoslovakia) is a Czech photographer known for his series of photographs taken in former Soviet Union. In his works made between 1994 and 2012, Wágner focuses mainly on depicting urban and village life in Siberia.

In ten years, he took the Czech Press Photo award for best Czech and Slovak photojournalists four times. In 2009, he received 2nd prize in the international FRAME competition.

In 2006, he participated in the documentarist project Prayer for Chernobyl with Czech-American photographer Antonín Kratochvíl and Greenpeace spokesman Václav Vašků.
