= Willi Wagner =

German middle-distance runner (born 1941)

Personal information
- Full name: Wilhelm Wagner
- Nationality: German
- Born: 3 October 1941 (age 84)

Sport
- Sport: Middle-distance running
- Event: Steeplechase

Wilhelm Wagner (born 3 October 1941) is a German middle-distance runner. He competed in the 3000 metres steeplechase at the 1968 Summer Olympics and the 1972 Summer Olympics.
