= Alan Wagner =

American journalist

Alan Cyril Wagner (October 1, 1931 – December 18, 2007) was an American television executive, radio personality, writer, and opera historian and critic. He served as the East Coast vice president of programming at CBS from 1976 to 1982. After he left CBS, he became the first president of Disney Channel, but only served in the role for a year.

== Biography ==
Born in New York City, Wagner grew up in the Brighton Beach neighborhood of Brooklyn. He earned bachelor's and master's degrees from Columbia University. He served in the United States Navy during the mid-1950s, notably appearing on The Ed Sullivan Show in 1956 performing a stand-up comedy bit with a group of fellow seamen. A passionate advocate for opera, Wagner became the host of the WNYC radio program Living Opera in 1957 after his contract with the Navy came to an end. The program aired for two-hours every Sunday morning, featuring excerpts from opera recordings and interviews with performers and other personalities from the opera world. Wagner would also often relate humorous and interesting backstage stories that he had experienced or had heard about. He left Living Opera in 1968 after hosting the program for eleven years.

Wagner's contributions to the field of opera also extended to more scholarly activities. He was a frequent contributor to both the New York City Opera's radio broadcasts and the Metropolitan Opera radio broadcasts, serving as a commentator, host, and a frequent intermission guest on those programs. Considered a knowledgeable opera historian, he gave popular lectures on opera for the Metropolitan Opera Guild's education department, was a guest lecturer at several universities, and wrote articles for many years for Opera News magazine. His first contribution to the magazine was the 1958 article "Tristan and God," an essay which "placed Tristan und Isolde in the tradition of Christian redemption drama". He continued to write articles for the magazine up into the 2000s (decade) with his more recent work including an interview with opera legend Judith Blegen. Wagner also contributed articles to Playbill, High Fidelity, Musical America, Stage Bill, and Reader's Digest. In 1961 he published a book of backstage anecdotes entitled, Prima Donnas and Other Wild Beasts.

While doing Living Opera, Wagner began working for CBS and eventually worked his way up to becoming the company's East Coast vice president of programming in 1976. He served in that position for almost seven years, during which time he was responsible for developing and overseeing numerous television programs, most notably hits like All in the Family, Kojak, M*A*S*H, The Bob Newhart Show, The Waltons, and The Mary Tyler Moore Show. He also brought several cultural programs to CBS, notably commissioning Igor Stravinsky's opera The Flood (1962), and orchestrating Vladimir Horowitz: a Concert at Carnegie Hall (1968) and Sills and Burnett at the Met (1976).

Wagner left CBS in 1982 when the Walt Disney Company approached him to become the first president of the Disney Channel. The cable channel was a novel idea at the time, being the first cable station to be entirely dedicated to programming for children and the family. Given a $100 million budget, Wagner put together a staff of programmers to create new shows for the channel in addition to drawing from Disney’s extensive collection of prior television programs and films. The channel's first broadcasting day aired on April 18, 1983. It initially started with a 16-hour-a-day service.

Wagner left the Disney Channel after the station's first year of programming, after which he formed his own independent film and television production company, Boardwalk Entertainment. He also worked as an adjunct professor at Syracuse University and Yale University where he lectured on subjects related to his interests in both television and opera. He was awarded a Burkey Award from the Writers Guild of America in 1983 and a Silver Circle Award from the New York Chapter of the National Academy of Television Arts and Sciences.

Wagner died in Manhattan in 2007. He was married to Martha Wagner (née Dreyfus) for fifty-one years. They had one son, David, two daughters, Susan and Elizabeth, and five grandchildren.
