= 2018 in literature =

This article contains information about the literary events and publications of 2018.

== Events ==
- July – Stormzy's publisher imprint Merky Books is launched in London.
- August 11 – Writer V. S. Naipaul, on his deathbed in London, has Tennyson's poem "Crossing the Bar" read to him by the newspaper editor Geordie Greig.
- September 16 – Lady Mary Wroth's pastoral closet drama Love's Victory receives its first fully professional, publicly staged (filmed) performance, at Penshurst Place in England, where it was probably written about 1618. It is the first known original pastoral drama and thought to be the first original dramatic comedy to be written by a woman.
- October 19 – The exhibition Anglo-Saxon Kingdoms: Art, Word, War, opening at the British Library, includes the earliest surviving will of an Englishwoman. Written on "a small, stained sheet of parchment", the detailed testament of Wynflæd is thought to date from the mid- to late 10th century.
- October 26 – Under the Thirty-seventh Amendment of the Constitution of Ireland, a referendum in the Republic approves removing the offence of publishing or uttering blasphemous matter from the Constitution.
- November 19 – The Prix littéraire des collégiens in Quebec is suspended after five shortlisted authors condemn its sponsorship by Amazon as "promotion of a multinational that harms bookstores".

== New books ==
Dates after each title indicate U.S. publication, unless otherwise indicated.

=== Fiction ===
- Claudia Amengual - El lugar inalcanzable (April)
- Sharon Bala – The Boat People
- Jason Barker – Marx Returns (February 23, UK)
- Pat Barker – The Silence of the Girls (September 4, UK)
- Julian Barnes – The Only Story (February 1, UK)
- Paul Goldberg – The Chateau (February 13)
- Belinda Bauer – Snap (May 15)
- John Boyne – A Ladder to the Sky
- Anna Burns – Milkman (May, UK)
- Jonathan Coe – Middle England (November 8, UK)
- S. A. Cosby – My Darkest Prayer
- Tsitsi Dangarembga – This Mournable Body
- Patrick deWitt – French Exit
- Nick Drnaso – Sabrina (May 22, graphic novel)
- Esi Edugyan – Washington Black (August)
- Chris Hammer – Scrublands
- Sarah Henstra – The Red Word
- Jonas Jonasson – The Accidental Further Adventures of the Hundred-Year-Old Man
- Stephen King – Elevation
- Torsten Krol – Foreverman
- Rachel Kushner – The Mars Room (June)
- Olivia Laing – Crudo (June, UK)
- Ian McDonald – Time Was (April 24, UK)
- Sophie Mackintosh – The Water Cure (May, UK)
- Rebecca Makkai – The Great Believers (June)
- Daniel Mason – The Winter Soldier (September 11)
- Andrés Neuman – Fractura (Madrid and Buenos Aires)
- Michael Ondaatje – Warlight (May 8, UK)
- Delia Owens – Where the Crawdads Sing (August 14)
- Casey Plett – Little Fish
- Richard Powers – The Overstory (April 3)
- Tom Rachman – The Italian Teacher (March 22, UK)
- Marieke Lucas Rijneveld – The Discomfort of Evening (De avond is ongemak) (Netherlands)
- Robin Robertson – The Long Take (February 13, UK)
- Sally Rooney – Normal People (August 28, UK)
- Donal Ryan – From a Low and Quiet Sea (March 22, UK)
- Elif Şafak – On Dakika Otuz Sekiz Saniye (10 Minutes 38 Seconds in this Strange World) (Turkey)
- Nic Stone – Dear Martin
- Tanya Tagaq – Split Tooth
- Zlatko Topčić – Overture
- Nico Walker – Cherry (August 14)
- Joshua Whitehead – Jonny Appleseed

=== Children and young people ===
- Elizabeth Acevedo – The Poet X (verse novel, March 6)
- Arndís Þórarinsdóttir – Nærbuxnaverksmiðjan
- Tomi Adeyemi – Children of Blood and Bone (March 6)
- David Almond – The Colour of the Sun (May 3, UK)
- Ross Burach – Truck Full of Ducks
- Connie Glynn – Princess in Practice (September 15, UK)
- Candy Gourlay – Bone Talk (August 2, UK)
- Grace Lin – A Big Mooncake for Little Star
- Hilary McKay – The Skylarks War (September 20, UK)
- Patricia McKissack – Who Will Bell the Cat?
- Charlotte Pence – Marlon Bundo's: A Day in the Life of the Vice President (March 19)
- Anne Renaud – Fania's Heart
- Manon Steffan Ros – Llyfr Glas Nebo (Wales)
- Jill Twiss – A Day in the Life of Marlon Bundo (March 18)
- David Walliams – The Ice Monster (November 6, UK)

=== Drama ===
- Howard Brenton – The Shadow Factory
- Jackie Sibblies Drury – Fairview
- Jeremy O. Harris – Slave Play

=== Non-fiction ===
- Behrouz Boochani – No Friend But the Mountains: Writing from Manus Prison (Australia)
- Amaranth Borsuk – The Book (April 27)
- James Comey – A Higher Loyalty: Truth, Lies and Leadership (April 17)
- Anthony Freeman – One Step Closer: 40 Doses of Motivation, Hacks, and Experiences to Share with Millennial Catholics (February 6, Italy)
- Jim Holt – When Einstein Walked with Gödel (May 15)
- Dan Jones – The Colour of Time: A New History of the World, 1850–1960 (August 9, UK)
- Michelle McNamara – I'll Be Gone in the Dark: One Woman's Obsessive Search for the Golden State Killer (February 27)
- Omarosa Manigault – Unhinged: An Insider's Account of the Trump White House (August 14)
- Martin Rees – On the Future
- Albert Samaha – Never Ran, Never Will (September 4)
- Julius S. Scott – The Common Wind: Afro-American Currents in the Age of the Haitian Revolution (written as PhD thesis 1986)
- Antony Sher – Year of the Mad King: the Lear diaries (March 15, UK)
- Sylvain Tesson – Un été avec Homère (April 26, France)
- Sander Verhaeg – Working from Within: The Nature and Development of Quine's Naturalism
- Tara Westover – Educated: A Memoir
- Michael Wolff – Fire and Fury: Inside the Trump White House (January 9)
- Shoshana Zuboff – The Age of Surveillance Capitalism: The Fight for a Human Future at the New Frontier of Power

=== Biography and memoirs ===
- Viv Albertine – To Throw Away Unopened (April/May, UK)
- Paul D. Gibson – The Lost Soul of Eamonn Magee (April, UK)
- Tom Gregory – A Boy in the Water (August 30, UK)
- Lindsey Hilsum – In Extremis: The Life and Death of the War Correspondent Marie Colvin (November)
- Jean-Marie Le Pen – Mémoires: fils de la nation (March 1, France)
- Michelle Obama – Becoming (November 13)
- Bart Van Es – The Cut Out Girl: a story of War and Family, Lost and Found (August 2, UK)
- Clemantine Wamariya with Elizabeth Weil – The Girl Who Smiled Beads
- Raynor Winn – The Salt Path (March 22, UK)
- Benjamin Zephaniah – The Life and Rhymes of Benjamin Zephaniah: The Autobiography (May 3, UK)

== Deaths ==
Birth years link to the corresponding "[year] in literature" article:

- January 1 – Jahn Otto Johansen, Norwegian non-fiction writer and 1982 Cappelen Prize recipient, 83 (born 1934)
- January 3 – Fred Bass, American bookseller and owner of the Strand Bookstore, 89 (born 1928)
  - Valery Chalidze, Russian-born American publisher, 79 (born 1938)
  - Philip Eden FRMetS, English weather historian, 66 (born 1951)
  - Keorapetse Kgositsile, South African poet and National Poet Laureate, 79 (born 1938)
  - Ambalavaner Sivanandan, Sri Lankan writer and 1998 Commonwealth Writers' Prize winner in the Best First Book category for Europe and South Asia, 94 (born 1923)
- January 4 – Aharon Appelfeld, Romanian-born Israeli writer, 85 (born 1932)
- January 5 – Muntazir Baba, Pakistani Pushto poet, 68 (born 1950)
  - Rasa Chughtai, Indian-born Pakistani Urdu poet, 89 (born 1928)
  - Donald D. Evans, Canadian philosopher with an interest in Dostoevsky and Camus, 90 (born 1927)
  - Carlo Pedretti, Italian historian, 89 (born 1928)
  - Marina Ripa di Meana, Italian best-selling autobiographer, 76 (born 1941)
- January 7 – Markku Into, Finnish poet and translator, 72 (born 1945)
  - Bjørg Vik, Norwegian novelist, short story writer and playwright, co-founder of feminist magazine Sirene, 82 (born 1935)
- January 8 – J. F. C. Harrison, English historian, 96 (born 1921)
  - Jenny Joseph, English poet, 85 (born 1932)
  - Tricia Walker, English best-selling writer, 53 (born 1964)
- January 9 – Heikki Kirkinen, Finnish historian, 90 (born 1927)
  - Yılmaz Onay, Turkish writer and translator, 80 (born 1937)
  - Mario Perniola, Italian philosopher and professor of aesthetics, 76 (born 1941)
- January 10 – Gordon Hølmebakk, Norwegian publishing editor, essayist and novelist, 89 (born 1928)
- January 12 – Doodhnath Singh, Indian Hindi language writer, 81 (born 1936)
  - Heinrich von Stietencron, German Indologist, 84 (born 1933)
- January 13 – Darmanto Jatman, Indonesian poet, 75 (born 1942)
- January 14 – Geoffrey Best FBA, English historian, 89 (born 1928)
  - Pablo García Baena, Spanish poet and 1984 Asturias Prize recipient, 96 (born 1921)
  - Samuel A. Schreiner Jr., American writer, 96 (born 1921)
- January 15 – Moussa Diagana, Mauritanian writer, 71 (born 1946)
- January 17 – Guy Dupré, French writer and publisher, 89 (born 1928)
- January 18 – Peter Mayle, English best-selling memoirist of A Year in Provence and A Good Year, 78 (born 1939
  - Nancy Richler, Canadian novelist and second cousin of the novelist Mordecai Richler, 60 (born 1957)
  - Henry Soles Jr., American editor of two books: The Soul Food New Testament and the Children of Color Bible (both published by Tyndale House), 82 (born 1935)
- January 19 – Saqi Farooqi, Pakistani poet, 81 (born 1936)
  - David M. Knight, English historian of science, 81 (born 1936)
- January 21 – Jock Haswell, English military historian and intelligence officer, 98 (born 1919)
- January 22 – Emilio Gastón, Spanish poet, 83 (born 1935)
  - Ursula K. Le Guin, American science fiction and fantasy author, 88 (born 1929)
- January 23 – Nicanor Parra, Chilean poet and physicist, 103 (born 1914)
- January 24 – Matti Rissanen, Finnish philologist with an interest in Old English, director of the project that produced the Helsinki Corpus of English Texts covering 1,000 years of the English language and used widely since its publication in 1991, involved in the translation of Shakespeare, 80 (born 1937)
- January 25 – Claribel Alegría, Nicaraguan poet, 93 (born 1924)
  - Shawkat Ali, Bangladeshi writer, 81 (born 1936)
  - Neagu Djuvara, Romanian historian, essayist, philosopher and novelist, 101 (born 1916)
- January 29 – Anthony Kemp, English military historian, 78 (born 1939)
  - Stewart Sutherland, Baron Sutherland of Houndwood KT, FRSE, FBA, FKC, Scottish philosopher of religion, explorer of continental thinkers including Fyodor Dostoevsky, Søren Kierkegaard, Albert Camus and Simone Weil, 76 (born 1941)
- January 30 – Andreas Gruschke, German writer and sinologist, 57 (born 1960)
  - Richard Murphy, Irish poet, 90 (born 1927)
- January 31 – Haim Gouri, Israeli poet, 94 (born 1923)
- February 1 – André Baudry, French philosophy professor and founder of the homophile review Arcadie, 95 (born 1922)
  - Niranjan Bhagat, Indian poet in the English and Gujarati languages (the English being mostly in the style of Gitanjali), 1949 Kumar Suvarna Chandrak recipient, 1953 Narmad Suvarna Chandrak recipient, 1969 Ranjitram Suvarna Chandrak recipient, 1998 Premanand Suvarna Chandrak recipient, 1999 Sahitya Akademi Award for Gujarati language recipient, 2001 Narsinh Mehta Award winner, 91 (born 1926)
  - William Whitehead, Canadian writer and longtime partner of fellow writer Timothy Findley, 86 (born 1931)
- February 3 – Bill Teale, American educator and literacy advocate, 70 (born 1947)
- February 5 – Gregor Dorfmeister (pseudonym Manfred Gregor), German novelist (Die Brücke, Town Without Pity), 88 (born 1929)
  - Mathieu Riboulet, French novelist and 2012 Prix Décembre recipient, 57 (born 1960)
- February 6 – Liliana Bodoc, Argentine fantasy writer, 59 (born 1958)
  - Douglas Botting, English biographer, 83 (born 1934)
  - Jao Tsung-I (饒宗頤), Chinese-born Hong Kong sinologist, calligrapher and historian, 100 (born 1917)
  - James W. Sire, American writer, professor of English literature, philosophy and theology, editor for InterVarsity Press, 84 (born 1933)
  - John Anthony West, American science fiction writer with an interest in Egypt, 85 (born 1932)
  - Michael White, English biographer of C. S. Lewis and others, and mystery fiction writer, 58 (born 1959)
- February 7
  - Brahim Akhiat, Moroccan writer, 77 (born c. 1941)
  - John Perry Barlow, American internet activist, writer, and lyricist, 70
- February 9 – Alfonso Lacadena, Spanish Mesoamerican epigraphist and academic at Complutense University of Madrid, 53 (born 1964)
  - Edward Pearce, English biographer and playwright, 78 (born 1939)
  - Keith M. Wilson, English historian (date of birth unknown)
- February 10 – Michiko Ishimure (石牟礼道子), Japanese writer, 90 (born 1927)
- February 11 – Raymond Vautherin, French-born Italian linguist, patois poet, playwright and translator, 82 (born 1935)
- February 12 – Bill Crider, American writer of crime, mystery, horror and westerns, 76 (born 1941)
  - Jack Ludwig, Canadian novelist, short story writer, essayist and the basis of the character Valentine Gersbach in Saul Bellow's novel Herzog, 95 (born 1922)
  - Françoise Xenakis, French writer, 87 (born 1930)
- February 13 – Ernest Hecht OBE, Czechoslovak-born English publisher and founder of Souvenir Press, 88 (born 1929)
  - Victor Milán, American libertarian science fiction writer, 63 (born 1954)
- February 14 – Lerone Bennett Jr., American scholar, chronicler of life for the blacks in that country and editor of Ebony, 89 (born 1928)
- February 15 – Tosun Bayrak, Turkish writer and translator known for efforts on works of the Sufi mystic Ibn Arabi, 92 (born 1926)
  - Steven Collins, English-born American Buddhist studies scholar, 66 (born 1951)
  - Iseabail Macleod MBE, Scottish lexicographer and former Director of the Scottish National Dictionary Association, 81 (born 1936)
  - Daniel Vernet, French writer, 72, (born 1945)
- February 16 – Eleanor Winsor Leach, American academic from whom "Vergilians learned much... on the Eclogues, Georgics, and Aeneid, her 1974 book on the Eclogues, her two major [of] Roman literature, art, and society, and many articles on Latin poetry and painting and their reception," 80 (born 1937)
- February 17 – Akinwunmi Isola, Nigerian playwright, novelist (O Leku) and promoter of the Yoruba language, 78 (born 1939)
- February 18 – John David Morley, English novelist and travel writer, 70 (born 1948)
- February 20 – Tōta Kaneko (金子兜太), Japanese Person of Cultural Merit, 2005 Cikada Prize recipient, 2015 Asahi Prize recipient, 98 (born 1919)
  - Roy McDonald, Canadian poet, 80 (born 1937)
  - Zigmas Zinkevičius, Lithuanian linguist-historian and 1994 Herder Prize recipient, 93 (born 1925)
- February 21 – Beryl Fletcher, New Zealand feminist novelist, 79 (born 1938)
- February 22 – Euler Granda, Ecuadorian poet and 2009 Premio Eugenio Espejo recipient, 82 (born 1935)
- February 23 – Wolfhart Westendorf, German Egyptologist, 93 (born 1924)
- February 25 – Michael Green, English novelist and playwright, 91 (born 1927)
  - Cynthia Heimel, American feminist writer of satirical books and playwright, 70 (born 1947)
  - Penny Vincenzi, English writer of novels and short stories, 78 (born 1939)
- February 28 – Pierre Milza, French historian and biographer, 85 (born 1932)
- March 1 – Diana Der Hovanessian, Armenian American poet, translator and professor at Yerevan State University, 83 (born 1934)
- March 2 – Adela Calva Reyes, Mexican writer and playwright, 50–51 (born 1967)
  - Gordon Challis, New Zealand poet, 85 (born 1932)
  - Ota Filip, Czech novelist who wrote both in German and Czech, 87 (born 1930)
- March 2 – Barbara Kiefer Lewalski, American literary scholar and authority on Renaissance literature known for work on John Milton, 87 (born 1931)
- March 3 – Jacques Gernet, French sinologist, 96 (born 1921)
  - Emma Hannigan, Irish writer known for writing about her experience with cancer, 45 (born 1972)
  - Anthony Lejeune, English writer, 89 (born 1928)
  - Ivone Ramos, Cape Verdean writer, 91 (born 1926)
  - Jorge Wagensberg Lubinski, Spanish physicist, academic (University of Barcelona), writer and aphorist, founder director of CosmoCaixa, 69 (born 1948)
- March 4 – José Triana, Cuban poet and playwright, 87 (born 1931)
- March 5 – Robert Assaraf, Moroccan historian, 81 (born 1936)
  - Derek Bickerton, English-born American linguist, academic and writer of novels, 91 (born 1926)
  - Clive Sinclair FRSL, English fiction writer included in Granta's 1983 list of Best Young British Novelists, 70 (born 1948)
  - Hayden White, American historian in the tradition of literary criticism (Metahistory: The Historical Imagination in Nineteenth-Century Europe), 89 (born 1928)
- March 6 – Lucie Brock-Broido, American poet and academic, 61 (born 1956)
  - Peter Nicholls, Australian writer and editor of The Encyclopedia of Science Fiction, 78 (born 1939)
  - Indra Bahadur Rai, Indian writer, 91 (born 1927)
- March 8 – Sir Wilson Harris, Guyanese poet, essayist, and fiction writer (Palace of the Peacock), 96 (born 1921)
  - Jean Jolivet, French philosopher and medievalist, 93 (born 1925)
  - Gerd Søraa, Norwegian writer of novels and local history, 83 (born 1934)
  - Peter Temple, Australian crime fiction writer, 71 (born 1946)
  - Kate Wilhelm, American science fiction, mystery and suspense writer, 89 (born 1928)
- March 9 – Ulla Nenonen, Finnish missionary and Bible translator, 84 (born 1933)
- March 10 – Val Mulkerns, Irish writer and poet, 93 (born 1925)
- March 11 – H. Blair Neatby, Canadian historian, 93 (born 1924)
  - David W. Noble, American historian, 92 (born 1925)
  - Mary Rosenblum, American science fiction and mystery writer, 65 (born 1952)
  - Mario Vegetti, Italian historian of philosophy, 81 (born 1937)
- March 12 – Emily Stipes Watts, American literary historian, 81 (born 1936)
- March 13 – Emily Nasrallah, Lebanese writer of novels, children's stories and short story collections, 86 (born 1931)
- March 14 – Robert L. Bireley, American Jesuit historian of Counter-Reformation Central Europe, 84 (born 1933)
  - Alfred W. Crosby, American ecological historian (The Columbian Exchange, Ecological Imperialism), 87 (born 1931)
  - David Wyman, American historian (The Abandonment of the Jews), 89 (born 1929)
- March 16 – Russell Freedman, American biographer, non-fiction and children's writer, 88 (born 1929)
- March 17 – Zdeněk Mahler, Czech writer and biographer, 89 (born 1928)
  - Sushil Siddharth, Hindi prose and poetry writer, critic, editor and satirist, 59 (born 1958)
- March 18 – Li Ao (李敖), Chinese-Taiwanese essayist and historian, 82 (born 1935)
  - Michael Rutschky, German writer and 1997 Heinrich Mann Prize recipient, 74 (born 1943)
- March 19 – Jürg Laederach, Swiss writer and 1997 Austrian State Prize for European Literature recipient, 72 (born 1945)
  - Luo Fu, Taiwanese poet, 89 (born 1928)
  - Kedarnath Singh, Indian poet, critic and essayist, 83 (born 1934).
- March 20 – Ann-Charlotte Alverfors, Swedish writer, 71 (born 1947)
  - Tom Griffin, American playwright (The Boys Next Door), 72 (born 1946)
- March 22 – Khozh-Akhmed Bersanov, Russian Chechen writer and ethnographer, 91 (born 1926)
  - Jan Kantůrek, Czech translator, 69 (born 1948)
  - Morten Piil, Danish film critic and translator of Vladimir Nabokov, 75, (born 1943)
  - Dariush Shayegan, Iranian cultural theorist and philosopher, winner of the French ADELF award presented by the Association of French Authors in 2004 for his French novel Land of Mirage, 83, (born 1935)
- March 23 – Philip Kerr, Scottish writer of historical detective thrillers and children's books, 62 (born 1956)
  - Alberto Ongaro, Italian writer of historical and adventure books, 92 (born 1925)
  - Aileen Paterson MBE, Scottish writer and illustrator of children's books, 83 (born 1934)
- March 24 – John Ehle, American "father of Appalachian literature", 92 (born 1925)
- March 25 – Bob Biderman, British-American novelist, 77 or 78 (born 1940) (date death announced)
- March 28 – Clément Rosset, French philosopher and writer, 78 (born 1939)
- March 29 – Anita Shreve, American novelist (The Pilot's Wife, The Weight of Water, Stella Bain), 71 (born 1946)
  - Ivor Forbes Guest, English historian and writer, 97 (born 1920)
  - Drue Heinz, American literary publisher (The Paris Review) and patron (Drue Heinz Literature Prize), 103 (born 1915)
- March 31 – Margarita Carrera, Guatemalan philosopher, professor, writer and 1996 laureate of the Miguel Ángel Asturias National Prize in Literature, 88 (born 1929)
- April 1 – Brian Moynahan, English historian and biographer, 77 (born 1941)
  - Efraín Trelles, Peruvian historian of Spanish colonialism, 64 (born 1953)
- April 2 – Ahmed Khaled Tawfik, Egyptian novelist, 55 (born 1962)
- April 3 – Arrigo Petacco, Italian journalist and writer, 88 (born 1929)
- April 4 – John Lynch, English historian of Latin America, 91 (born 1927)
- April 5 – Irina Tokmakova, Russian poet, playwright and translator, 89 (born 1929)
- April 6 – Daniel Chavarría, Uruguay-born Cuban writer, 84 (born 1933)
  - Henryk Skolimowski, Polish philosopher, 87 (born 1930)
  - Edla Van Steen, Brazilian playwright and short story writer, 81 (born 1936)
- April 7 – Gerd Honsik, Austrian writer, 76 (born 1941)
- April 8 – Efraín Jara Idrovo, Ecuadorian writer, existentialist poet and 1999 Premio Eugenio Espejo recipient, 92 (born 1926)
- April 10 – Danarto, Indonesian writer and artist, 76 (born 1941)
  - J. D. McClatchy, American poet, 72 (born 1945)
- April 11 – Alexander Welsh, American literary scholar, 84 (born 1933)
- April 12 – Sergio Pitol, Mexican novelist, translator and 2005 Miguel de Cervantes Prize recipient, 85 (born 1933)
- April 14 – Frank Bren, Australian actor and playwright, 74 (born 1943)
  - Sam Hamill, American poet and publisher, 74 (born 1943)
  - Jon Michelet, Norwegian writer, 73 (born 1944)
- April 15 – Luise Hercus, German-born Australian linguist, 92 (born 1926)
- April 16 – Beverley Farmer, Australian novelist and short story writer, 77 (born 1941)
- April 17 – Joan Chase, American novelist, 81 (born 1936)
- April 18 – Jean Flori, French medieval historian, 82 (born 1936)
  - Howard Sachar, American historian, 90 (born 1928)
  - Willibald Sauerländer, German art historian, 94 (born 1924)
- April 19 – Arnold Eidslott, Norwegian poet, 91 (born 1926)
  - Herbert Pilch, German linguist and celtologist, 91 (born 1926)
- April 20 – Pavel Šrut, Czech poet, writer and translator, 78, (born 1940)
- April 21 – Firmin Le Bourhis, French writer, 67 (born 1950)
- April 22 – Balantrapu Rajanikanta Rao, Indian writer, composer and musicologist, 98 (born 1920)
- April 23 – Edward W. Tayler, American literary scholar, 87 (born 1931)
- April 24 – Belal Chowdhury, Bangladeshi poet, 79 (born 1938)
  - Dinu C. Giurescu, Romanian historian, 91 (born 1927)
  - Emma Smith, English writer whose best-selling novel was republished 50 years later, 94 (born 1923)
- April 25 – Steven Marcus, American literary critic and scholar, 89 (born 1928)
- April 26 – Elvira Orphée, Argentine writer, Guggenheim Fellow (1988), 95 (born 1922)
- April 28 – Yevgeny Titarenko, Russian writer, 82 (born 1935)
- May 2 – Kottayam Pushpanath, Indian novelist and translator, 80 (born 1938)
- May 3 – Demetrio Túpac Yupanqui, Peruvian academic and Quechua translator of Don Quixote, 94 (born 1923)
- May 4 – Renate Dorrestein, Dutch writer and journalist, 64 (born 1954)
- May 5 – Klaus Dede, German writer and journalist, 82 (born 1935)
  - Rosemarie Schuder, German writer, 89 (born 1928)
- May 6 – Cirilo Bautista, Filipino writer and poet, 76 (born 1941)
  - Jamal Naji, Jordanian fiction writer, 63 (born 1954)
- May 7 – Andreas Findig, Austrian writer, 56 (born 1933)
  - Mikhail German, Russian writer, 85 (born 1933)
- May 9 – Murai Shimako (村井志摩子), Japanese playwright, 89 (born 1928)
- May 10 – Günther Haensch, German linguist and lexicographer, 95 (born 1923)
  - Adam Parfrey, American writer, editor and publisher (Feral House), 61 (born 1957)
- May 11 – Gérard Genette, French literary theorist, 87 (born 1930)
  - Josh Greenfeld, American playwright and screenwriter, 90 (born 1928)
  - Peter Mayer, American publisher (The Overlook Press, Penguin Books), 82 (born 1936)
- May 13 – Balkavi Bairagi, Indian poet and politician, 87 (born 1931)
- May 14 – John James, Welsh poet, 79 (born 1939)
- May 15 – Balakumaran, Indian writer, 71 (born 1946)
  - Tom Murphy, Irish playwright, 83 (born 1935)
  - Barbara Nawrocka-Dońska, Polish journalist and feminist essayist, 93 (born 1924)
- May 16 – François Bréda, Romanian writer and literary critic, 62 (born 1956)
  - Elena Gremina, Russian scriptwriter, director and playwright, 61 (born 1956)
  - Miriam T. Griffin, American classical scholar, Emeritus Fellow in Ancient History at Somerville College, 82 (born 1934)
- May 17 – Inger Brattström, Swedish writer, 97 (born 1923)
  - Craig Harbison, American art historian, 74 (born 1944)
- May 18 – John Ashdown-Hill, English historian and writer on late medieval English history, focusing on the House of York and Richard III of England, whose work led to the discovery of Richard III's remains, 69 (born 1949)
  - Liam Ó Muirthile, Irish poet, 68 (born 1950)
- May 19 – Bernard Lewis, Anglo-American Middle East historian and professor (Princeton University), 101 (born 1916)
- May 20 – Ramón Chao, Spanish anti-Francoist journalist (Le Monde, La Voz de Galicia) and writer, 82 (born 1935)
- May 21 – António Arnault, Portuguese politician, poet and Grand Master of Grande Oriente Lusitano, Minister of Social Affairs (1978), 82 (born 1936)
- May 22 – Alberto Dines, Brazilian journalist (Jornal do Brasil, Grupo Abril, Observatório da Imprensa), writer and professor (Columbia University Graduate School of Journalism), 86, (born 1932)
- May 23 – Vinod Bhatt, Indian humorist and biographer, 80 (born 1938)
- May 24 – Paul Harris, Scottish writer and publisher, 69 (born 1948)
- May 26 – Mazhar Kaleem, Pakistani lawyer and novelist (Imran Series), 75 (born 1942)
- May 27 – Gardner Dozois, American science fiction writer (born 1947)
- May 28 – Semavi Eyice, Turkish art historian (Istanbul University), 95 (born 1922)
- May 31 – M. L. Thangappa, Indian writer, 84 (born 1934)
- June 1
  - Poldy Bird, Argentine writer, 76 (born 1941)
  - Jill Ker Conway, Australian-American scholar and author, 83 (born 1934)
  - John Julius Norwich, English historian and travel writer, 88 (born 1929)
  - Michael Andrew Screech, English Renaissance scholar, 92 (born 1926)
- June 3 – Alessandra Appiano, Italian writer and journalist, 59 (born 1959)
  - Gilbert Trausch, Luxembourg historian, 86 (born 1931)
  - Kyra Petrovskaya Wayne, Russian-born American writer, 99 (born 1918)
- June 4 – Abhimanyu Unnuth, Mauritian writer, 80 (born 1937)
- June 5 – Daša Drndić, Croatian radio playwright (Radio Belgrade) and novelist (Sonnenschein), 71 (born 1946)
- June 6 – Mateja Matevski, Macedonian poet, 89 (born 1929)
  - David McFadden, Canadian poet and travel writer, 77 (born 1940)
  - Mary Wilson, Baroness Wilson of Rievaulx, English poet, Spouse of the Prime Minister (1964–1970, 1974–1976), 102 (born 1916)
- June 7 – Philippe de Baleine, French writer, 96 (born 1921).
- June 8
  - Per Ahlmark, Swedish politician and writer (born 1939)
  - Anthony Bourdain, American chef, writer, and television personality (born 1956)
  - Liu Yichang, Hong Kong novelist, editor and publisher, a founder of Hong Kong's modern literature, 99 (born 1918)
- June 15 – Raoul Van Caenegem, Belgian historian, 90 (born 1927)
  - Macdara Woods, Irish poet, 76 (born 1942)
- June 17 – Andrei Ivanovich Stepanov, Soviet-born Russian diplomat and writer, 88 (born 1930)
- June 18 – Paul Gratzik, German writer, 82 (born 1936)
  - Nathan Shaham, Israeli writer, 93 (born 1925)
  - Marta Terry González, Cuban librarian, 87 (born 1931)
- June 19 – Stanley Cavell, American philosopher, 91 (born 1926)
  - Ivan Drach, Ukrainian poet, screenwriter and politician, member of Verkhovna Rada (1990–1994, 1998–2000, 2002–2006), 81 (born 1936)
  - Frank Vickery, Welsh playwright, 67 (born 1951)
- June 20 – Sándor Kányádi, Hungarian poet and translator, 89 (born 1929)
  - Mushtaq Ahmad Yusufi, Pakistani banker, writer and humorist, 94 (born 1923)
- June 21 – Oldřich Král, Czech sinologist and translator, 87 (born 1930)
  - Eric Stanley, English literary scholar and historian, 94 (born 1923)
- June 22 – Nahum Korzhavin, Russian-American poet, 92 (born 1925)
- June 23 – Donald Hall, American poet, former U.S. Poet Laureate, 89 (born 1926)
  - Richard Lowitt, American historian, 96 (born 1922)
  - Phan Huy Lê, Vietnamese historian, 84 (born 1934)
- June 24 – Keith Bosley, English poet and translator, 80 (born 1937)
- June 26 – Andrey Dementyev, Russian poet, 89 (born 1928)
- June 28 – François Bluche, French historian, 92 (born 1925)
  - Domenico Losurdo, Italian Marxist philosopher and historian (Liberalism: A Counter-History), 76 (born 1941)
  - Christine Nöstlinger, Austrian writer, 81 (born 1936)
- June 30 – Timothy Murphy, American poet, 67 (born 1951)
  - Fuat Sezgin, Turkish Islamic science historian (Goethe University Frankfurt), 93 (born 1924)
- July 1 – Bozhidar Dimitrov, Bulgarian historian, 72 (born 1945)
- July 2 – Meic Stephens, Welsh writer and editor (The Oxford Companion to the Literature of Wales, Library of Wales: Poetry 1900–2000), 79 (born 1938)
- July 3 – Thérèse Kleindienst, French librarian, 101 (born 1916)
- July 4 – Rogelio Mangahas, Filipino poet and writer, 79 (born 1939)
- July 5 – François Budet, French singer-songwriter, novelist, and poet, 78 (born 1940)
  - Gerald Messadié, French essayist and novelist, 87 (born 1931)
  - Michel Suffran, French novelist, 87 (born 1931)
- July 6 – Amritlal Vegad, Indian writer, 89 (born 1928)
- July 7 – Peter Sawyer, English historian, 90 (born 1928)
- July 8 – Anthony Kirk-Greene, English historian, 93 (born 1925)
- July 10 – Clive King, English writer, 94 (born 1924)
- July 13 – Atukwei Okai, Ghanaian poet and academic (University of Ghana), 77 (born 1941)
  - Claude Seignolle, French writer, 101 (born 1917)
- July 14 – Petr Weigl, Czech director, playwright and dramaturge, 79 (born 1939)
- July 17 – Radoslav Nenadál, Czech writer and English-language translator, 88 (born 1929)
  - Hugh Whitemore, English playwright, 82 (born 1936)
- July 18 – Anne Olivier Bell, English literary editor and art scholar, member of the Monuments Men Brigade, 102 (born 1916)
  - Ling Li (凌力), Chinese historical novelist and missile engineering technologist, 76 (born 1942)
- July 26 – Sha Yexin (沙叶新), Chinese playwright and political activist, 79 (born 1939)
- July 27 – Marco Aurelio Denegri, Peruvian linguist, intellectual and sexologist, 80 (born 1938)
- August 4 – Lluïsa Forrellad, Spanish writer, 91 (born 1927)
  - Anita Miller, American writer, publisher and co-founder of Academy Chicago Publishers, 91, (born 1926)
- August 5 – Matthew Sweeney, Irish poet, 65 (born 1952)
- August 6 – Kamrul Hasan Bhuiyan, Bangladeshi military officer and writer, 66 (born 1952)
  - Christian Habicht, German historian (Ancient Greece), 92 (born 1926)
  - Leonard Lewinsohn, American Islamic scholar, 64–65 (born 1953)
  - Anya Krugovoy Silver, American poet, 49 (born 1968)
- August 7 – Andrew Coburn, American fiction writer, essayist and newspaper columnist, 86 (born 1932)
  - Joel H. Silbey, American historian, 84 (born 1933)
  - Robley Wilson, American writer, 88 (born 1930)
- August 8 (actual date) or 9 (official date) – Mario Alinei, Italian linguist, 91 (born 1926)
  - Robert Hugh Ferrell, American historian, 97 (born 1921)
- August 10 – William Corbett, American poet, 75 (born 1942)
  - Mahmut Makal, Turkish writer, 88 (born 1930)
- August 11 – Pierre Coustillas, French University of Lille academic and literary scholar specialising in George Gissing, 88 (born 1930)
  - Sir Vidiadhar Surajprasad Naipaul, Trinidad-born British novelist and 2001 Nobel Prize laureate, 85 (born 1932)
- August 12 – Michael Scott Rohan, Scottish fantasy and science fiction writer, 67 (born 1951)
  - Steven T. Ross, American military historian, 81 (born 1937)
- August 13 – John Calder, Canadian-born British publisher who founded Calder Publishing in 1949, 91 (born 1927)
  - Georges Hausemer, Luxembourg fiction, travelogue and non-fiction writer, and translator from French, English, Spanish and Luxembourgeois into German, who sometimes worked as an illustrator using the pseudonym 'Theo Selmer, 92, 61 (born 1957)
  - Ann Moss FBA, English literary historian, 80 (born 1938)
- August 14 – Chemmanam Chacko, Indian poet, 92 (born 1926)
  - Eduard Uspensky, Russian children's writer (Uncle Fedya, His Dog, and His Cat), poet, playwright and screenwriter, 80 (born 1937)
- August 15 – Abu Bakr al-Jazaeri, Algerian Islamic scholar and writer, 97 (born 1921)
  - Allan Rune Pettersson, Swedish writer (Frankenstein's Aunt, Frankenstein's Aunt Returns), 82 (born 1936)
  - Sterling Stuckey, American historian specialising in slavery and Afro-American culture, 86 (born 1932)
- August 16 – Benny Andersen, Danish poet, short story writer, children's writer and pianist, 88 (born 1929)
  - George Athan Billias, American historian, 99 (born 1919)
  - Wakako Yamauchi, Japanese American playwright whose works were influential in Asian-American theatre, 93 (born 1924)
- August 17 – Jeremy Catto, English historian, 79 (born 1939)
  - Halima Xudoyberdiyeva, Uzbekistani nationalist, liberationist, feminist writer and poet, 71 (born 1947)
- August 18 – Tom Clark, American poet, biographer and poetry editor of The Paris Review between 1963 and 1973, 77 (born 1941)
  - Eduard Frolov, Russian historian, Head of Department of History of Ancient Greece and Rome at Saint Petersburg State University in 1971–2015 and member of the Journal of Ancient History editorial board, 85 (born 1933)
  - Henk Wesseling, Dutch historian, 81 (born 1937)
- August 20 – Matthew Aid, American military historian specializing in signal intelligence and history of National Security Agency, 60 (born 1958)
- August 21 – John Christgau, American writer on sports and his country's history, 84 (born 1934)
  - Vesna Krmpotić, Croatian writer, translator 1999 Vladimir Nazor Award recipient and 2013 Tin Ujević Award recipient, 86 (born 1932)
  - Hanna Mina, Syrian novelist, 94 (born 1924)
- August 22 – Jesús Torbado, Spanish writer and 1965 Alfaguara Prize recipient, 75 (born 1943)
- August 23 – Cindy Haug, Norwegian writer, 61 (born 1956)
  - Ann Ireland, Canadian novelist, writing instructor and past president of PEN Canada, 65 (born 1953)
  - Franck Venaille, French poet and 1996 Prix Mallarmé recipient, 81 (born 1936)
- August 24 – Stanley Morgan, English thriller writer, 88 (born 1929)
  - Ciril Zlobec, Slovene poet, 93 (born 1925)
- August 26 – Hamsad Rangkuti, Indonesian short story writer, 75 (born 1943)
  - Neil Simon, American playwright (Biloxi Blues, The Odd Couple), 1991 Pulitzer Prize winner (Lost in Yonkers) and 1965, 1985 and 1991 Tony winner, 91 (born 1927)
- August 28 – Josep Fontana, Spanish historian and Pompeu Fabra University academic, 86 (born 1931)
- August 29 – Carilda Oliver Labra, Cuban poet, 96 (born 1922)
- August 30 – Peter Corris, Australian academic, historian, journalist and novelist of historical and crime fiction, 76 (born 1942)
- August 31 – Ian Jones, author and television writer and director, 86 (born 1931)
  - Amanda Kyle Williams, American novelist of crime fiction, 61 (born 1957)
- September 1 – Margit Sandemo, Norwegian Swedish writer of historical fantasy works such as The Legend of the Ice People, 94 (born 1924)
  - Mykola Shytyuk, Ukrainian historian, 64 (born 1953)
  - Ehsan Yarshater, Iranian historian, linguist and Iranologist who was director of the Center for Iranian Studies at Columbia University, 98 (born 1920)
- September 3 – Rama Chowdhury, Bangladeshi writer, 81 (born 1937)
- September 5 – Bhagwatikumar Sharma, Indian Gujarati writer and journalist, 84 (born 1934)
  - Priscila Uppal, Canadian poet, novelist, playwright and teacher of creative writing, 43 (born 1974)
- September 6 – Salawat Gallyamov, Russian linguist, 58 (born 1959)
  - Gilbert Lazard, French linguist, Iranologist and translator of classical Persian poetry, 98 (born 1920)
- September 7 – Gaston-Armand Amaudruz, Swiss neo-fascist political philosopher, 97 (born 1920)
- September 8 – Christopher Harper-Bill, English medieval historian focusing on "the ecclesiastical history of England from the Norman Conquest to the eve of the Reformation" and editing episcopal and monastic records, 71 (born 1947)
- September 9 – Adrian C. Louis, American Lovelock Paiute tribe writer whose work focused on poverty, alcoholism and social problems, 72 (born 1946)
  - John W. Rogerson, English Anglican priest, theologian, biblical scholar and Emeritus Professor of Biblical Studies at the University of Sheffield, 83 (born 1935)
- September 10 – Paul Virilio, French philosopher of aesthetics, cultural theorist and urbanist, 86 (born 1932)
- September 12 – Ronald Carter MBE FRSA AcSS, English linguist and founding member of the Poetics and Linguistics Association, 71 (born 1947)
  - Albert Ullin OAM, German Australian children's bookseller and founder of Australia's first children's bookstore-The Little Bookroom, 88 (born 1930)
- September 13 – Guido Ceronetti, Italian poet, philosopher, playwright, puppeteer and translator, 91 (born 1927)
  - Albrecht Wellmer, German philosopher and 2006 Theodor W. Adorno Award recipient, 85 (born 1933)
  - John Wilcock, 91, English travel writer and co-founder of The Village Voice, 91 (born 1927)
- September 14 – Rudolf Schieffer, German historian specialising in medieval history and president of Monumenta Germaniae Historica between 1994 and 2012, 71 (born 1947)
- September 15 (date death announced) – Joris Borghouts, Dutch Egyptologist who in 1999 was elected a member of the Royal Netherlands Academy of Arts and Sciences, 79 (born 1939)
  - David Lowenthal FBA, American historian and geographer known for his work on cultural heritage, 95 (born 1923)
  - Lionello Puppi, Italian art historian, 86 (born 1931)
  - Charles Rappleye, American writer, editor and co-founder of the art magazine Artillery, 62 (born 1956)
  - David Rubadiri, Malawi poet, playwright, novelist, academic and diplomat, 88 (born 1930)
- September 16 – John Molony, Australian historian and Emeritus Professor of History at Australian National University, 91 (born 1927)
- September 17 – Stephen Jeffreys, English playwright who gave Thomas Shadwell's The Libertine a modern adaptation, 68 (born 1950)
  - Daniel N. Robinson, American philosopher, 81 (born 1937)
- September 18 – Marceline Loridan-Ivens, French memoirist (But You Did Not Come Back), 90 (born 1928)
- September 19 – Vishnu Khare, Indian Hindi poet and translator, 78 (born 1940)
  - Kondapalli Koteswaramma, Indian feminist writer, 100 (born 1918)
  - David Wong Louie, Chinese American novelist and short story writer, 63 (born 1954)
  - Pavel Řezníček, Czech poet, novelist (Alexandr v tramvaji), short story writer and translator from French, 76 (born 1942)
- September 20 – John Cunliffe, English children's writer, 85 (born 1933)
  - Inge Feltrinelli, German-born Italian publisher and photographer, 87 (born 1930)
  - Huang Ching-yuen, Chinese children's writer, 98 (born 1920)
- September 21 – Herbert Meier, Swiss writer, translator of French classical and modern plays into German and 1964 Conrad Ferdinand Meyer Prize recipient, 90 (born 1928)
  - Zinaida Mirkina, Russian poet, essayist (on Marina Tsvetaeva, Fyodor Dostoevsky and Alexander Pushkin) and translator of Sufi poetry as well as works by Rabindranath Tagore and Rainer Maria Rilke, 92 (born 1926)
- September 23 – Olav Angell, Norwegian poet, jazz musician, novelist, translator of James Joyce's Ulysses, and 2002 Riksmål Society Literature Prize and 2006 Bastian Prize recipient, 86 (born 1932)
  - Jane Fortune, American feminist art historian, 76 (born 1942)
  - Derek Wheatley QC, English barrister and novelist-The Silent Lady (Mona Lisa), 92 (born 1926 or 1927?)
- September 24 – Arnold Krammer, American historian specialising in German and American history, 77 (born 1941)
- September 25 – Ismail Fahd Ismail, Kuwaiti novelist, short story writer and literary critic, 78 (born 1940)
- September 27 – Kavita Mahajan, Indian feminist Marathi fiction and non-fiction writer, children's writer and translator focusing on social issues, 51 (born 1967)
- September 28 – Tamaz Chiladze, Georgian dramatist, poet and novelist (The Pond and The Brueghel Moon), 87 (born 1931)
  - Joe Masteroff, American playwright (Cabaret, She Loves Me) and 1967 Tony winner, 98 (born 1919)
- September 29 – Pascale Casanova, French literary critic rejected by French academia after her PhD but secured a posting at the United States Duke University, 59 (born 1959)
- September 30 – John J. McDermott, American philosopher, 86 (born 1932)
- October 1 – Donald Read, English historian, 88, (born 1930)
  - Antoine Sfeir, Franco-Lebanese journalist and professor who wrote books such as The Columbia World Dictionary of Islamism, 69 (born 1930)
- October 2 – Smilja Avramov, Serbian academic and educator, 100 (born 1918)
- October 3 – Fang Nanjiang (方南江), Chinese writer of military-themed novels and major general of the People's Armed Police, 75 (born 1942)
  - Heo Su-gyeong (허수경), South Korean poet, 54 (born 1964)
- October 6 – James Cowan, Australian author, 76 (born 1942)
  - Ira Gasman, American playwright and lyricist, 76 (born c. 1942)
  - Michel Vovelle, French historian specialising in French Revolution, 85 (born 1933)
- October 7 – Oleg Pavlov, Russian writer, 48 (born 1970)
- October 8 – David Wise, American spy novelist, writer of non-fiction (exposing Operation Ajax, Operation PBSuccess, Central Intelligence Agency involvement in the Bay of Pigs Invasion, in Laos and Vietnam, and efforts to overthrow Sukarno) and (inaugural) 1975 Orwell Award recipient, 88 (born 1930)
- October 9 – Robert Bausch, American novelist and short story writer, 73 (born 1945)
- October 11 – Fatos Arapi, Albanian poet and 2008 Struga Poetry Evenings Golden Wreath recipient, 89 (born 1929)
  - Pran Nevile, Indian historian (Lahore: A Sentimental Journey), 95 (born 1922)
  - Hebe Uhart, Argentine writer, 81 (born 1936)
- October 12 – Jan Jakob Tønseth, Norwegian biographer, essayist, member of the Norwegian Academy, novelist, poet, short story writer, translator, 1977 Gyldendal's Endowment recipient, 2002 Cappelen Prize recipient and 2007 Dobloug Prize recipient, 71 (born 1947)
- October 13 – Sue Hubbell, American librarian and essayist who wrote about beekeeping, 83 (born 1935)
- October 14 – H. G. Jones, American archivist, 94 (born 1924)
- October 15 – Arto Paasilinna, Finnish novelist (The Year of the Hare), 76 (born 1942)
- October 16 – David Helwig, Canadian editor, essayist, memoirist, novelist, poet, short story writer and translator, 80 (born 1938)
  - Even Hovdhaugen, Norwegian linguist, 77 (born 1941)
- October 18 – Anthea Bell OBE, English translator of Asterix, Austerlitz, Freud and Kafka, 82 (born 1936)
  - Hideo Osabe (長部日出雄), Japanese essayist, novelist and 1973 Naoki Prize recipient, 84 (born 1934)
- October 20 – Gaétan Gervais, Canadian historian and co-designer of the Franco-Ontarian flag, 74 (born 1944)
- October 21 – Robert Faurisson, British-born French professor of literature and historian, 89 (born 1929)
  - François Montmaneix, French poet, writer and 2003 Prix Guillaume Apollinaire recipient, 80 (born 1938)
  - Eleanor Witcombe, Australian screenwriter and playwright, 95 (born 1923)
- October 22 – Anne Fairbairn, Australian poet, journalist and expert in Arab culture, 90 (born 1928)
  - Raymond Fraser ONB, Canadian biographer, editor, essayist, memoirist, novelist, poet and short story writer, 77 (born 1941)
  - Robert Saladrigas, Catalan literary critic, 1991 Premi Sant Jordi de novel·la recipient and 2004 Josep Pla Award recipient, 78 (born 1940)
- October 23 – Tony Hoagland, American poet, 64 (born 1953)
  - John Hostettler, English writer of legal histories and biographies, 93 (born 192)
  - Louis O'Neill, Canadian writer, professor and politician, MNA (1976–1981), 93 (born 1925)
  - Rein Põder, Estonian writer and publisher, 75 (born 1943)
- October 23 – Alojz Rebula, Italian-born Slovene writer, playwright, essayist and 2005 Kresnik Award recipient, 94 (born 1924)
- October 24 – Anatoly Gladilin, Russian writer who defected to Paris, 83 (born 1935)
- October 25 – John Taylor Gatto, American teacher and writer on that country's modern education system (Dumbing Us Down, The Underground History of American Education), 82 (born 1935)
- October 26 – György Károly, Hungarian poet and writer, 65 (born 1953)
- October 27
  - Angela Bianchini, Italian-born woman critic and literary critic who defected to the United States during the 1940s, 97 (born 1921)
  - Ntozake Shange, American black feminist playwright and poet (born 1948)
- October 28 – Luis Miguel Enciso Recio, Spanish historian and politician, Senator (1977–1982), 88 (born 1930)
  - Peter Everwine, American poet, Professor Emeritus of English at Fresno State and translator, 88 (born 1930)
  - David Kenneth Fieldhouse FBA, English historian of the British Empire, 93 (born 1925)
  - I. John Hesselink, American theologian, 90 (born 1928)
  - Erno Polgar, Hungarian writer, 64 (born 1954)
- October 29 – Klaas Bruinsma, lecturer in English and history at Drachten and West Frisian language translator from Dutch, Spanish, Latin (Virgil) and Greek (Homer, Sophocles) among others—, 87 (born 1931)
  - Dave Duncan, Scottish-born Canadian fantasy and science fiction writer (West of January, The Cutting Edge), 85 (born 1933)
  - Li Xifan (李希凡), Chinese literary scholar and redologist, 90 (born 1927)
- October 30 – Yashwant Dev, Indian Marathi poet and composer, 91 (born 1926)
  - María Irene Fornés, Cuban-American playwright who led Off-Off-Broadway and engaged in a sexual liaison with Susan Sontag, 88 (born 1930)
  - Jin Yong GBM OBE, Hong Kong wuxia novelist, essayist and newspaper proprietor (Ming Pao), 94 (born 1924)
- October 30 – Sangharakshita, British Buddhist teacher and writer from the Triratna Buddhist Community, 93 (born 1925)
- October 31 – Louise DeSalvo, American writer on Italian-American culture and scholar of Virginia Woolf, 76 (born 1942)
- November 2 – Jane H. Hill, American anthropologist and linguist working with Native American languages of the Uto-Aztecan language family and anthropological linguistics of North American communities, 79 (born 1939)
- November 3 – Alistair Elliot, English librarian, poet, translator of Euripides's Medea and 2000 Cholmondeley Award recipient, 86 (born 1932)
  - Eric Schiller, American writer on chess and player of it, 63 (born 1955)
- November 4 – Bertil Mårtensson, Swedish writer of crime, fantasy and science fiction, 73 (born 1945)
  - Grant R. Osborne, American theologian and New Testament scholar, 76 (born 1942)
  - Ali Squalli Houssaini, Moroccan children's writer and lyricist of the national anthem, 86 (born 1932)
- November 6 – Coşkun Büktel, Turkish playwright, novelist and translator of D. H. Lawrence, 67 (born 1950)
  - Frances M. López-Morillas, American translator of Spanish literature (fiction and non-fiction) into English and wife of Professor Juan López-Morillas of the Departments of Spanish and Comparative Literature at Brown University, 1000 (born 1918)
- November 7 – Christopher Lehmann-Haupt, Scottish-born American editor, obituarist and book reviewer (The New York Times Book Review from 1965; senior daily book critic at The New York Times between 1969 and 1995), 84 (born 1934)
  - Alan Watson, Scottish legal scholar, one of the world's foremost authorities on Roman law, comparative law, legal history and law and religion, credited with coining the term "legal transplants", 85 (born 1933)
- November 8 – Bartolomé Bennassar, French historian specializing in Spanish and Latin American history, 1987 Grand Cross of the Civil Order of Alfonso X, the Wise recipient and 2005 Grand prix Gobert recipient, 89 (born 1929)
  - Chin Yang Lee (黎錦揚), Chinese-born American bestselling writer of The Flower Drum Song, 102 (born 1915)
- November 9 – Janet Paisley, Scottish writer and poet in Scots and English, 70 (born 1948)
  - Barre Toelken, American folklorist president of the American Folklore Society between 1977 and 1978 and editor of the Journal of American Folklore and Western Folklore, 83 (born 1935)
- November 10 – Liu Xuyi (刘绪贻), Chinese historian specialized in American studies, 105 (born 1913)
  - Marc Wilmet, Belgian linguist, 80 (born 1938)
- November 11 – Olga Harmony, Mexican playwright, 90 (born 1928)
  - Donald McCaig, American novelist, 78 (born 1940)
  - Alun Morgan, Welsh jazz critic noted for plain, lucid prose, 90 (born 1928)
  - Zeng Shiqiang (曾仕強), Taiwanese sinologist noted for his study of the oldest of the Chinese classics I Ching, 84 (born 1934)
  - Fred Patten, American contributor to the fantasy and science fiction genres, 77 (born 1940)
- November 12 – Stan Lee dies in Los Angeles, California.
- November 14 – Prabhat Nalini Das, Indian academic, Professor of English and translator into English, 91 (born 1927)
  - Fernando del Paso, Mexican novelist, essayist, poet, member of El Colegio Nacional de México since 1996, 1966 Xavier Villaurrutia Award, 1982 Rómulo Gallegos Prize, 2007 FIL Award, 2013 Alfonso Reyes International Prize and 2015 Miguel de Cervantes Prize recipient, 83 (born 1935)
- November 15 – E. D. Blodgett, Canadian poet, literary critic and translator, 83 (born 1935)
  - Aldyr Schlee, Brazilian short story writer and translator noted for designing the jersey of the Brazil national football team, 83 (born 1934)
- November 16 – Paul Ferris, Welsh biographer of Dylan Thomas, (and editor of his letters), Thomas's wife and Northcliffe, 89 (born 1929)
  - William Goldman, American writer in the fantasy and thriller genres who turned to screenwriting, 87 (born 1931)
- November 17 – Ajin Panjapan, Thai writer, 91 (born 19??)
- November 18 – Ilko Korunets, Ukrainian linguist, literary critic, professor and translator from English and Italian, 96 (born 1922)
  - Iain Moireach, Scottish Gaelic editor, novelist, poet and short story writer, 80 (born 1938)
- November 19 – Shiao Yi (蕭逸), Taiwanese-American wuxia novelist, 83 (born 1935)
- November 20 – James H. Billington, American academic, history teacher and former Librarian of Congress, 89 (born 1929)
- November 21 – Meena Alexander, Indian-born American feminist poet and scholar, 67 (born 1951)
  - Fahmida Riaz, Pakistani feminist poet, 72 (born 1946)
- November 22 – Judith Rodriguez AM, Australian editor, lecturer, librettist and poet who was the wife of Thomas Shapcott, 82 (born 1936)
- November 23 – Jean-Loup Rivière, French playwright and drama critic, 70 (born 1948)
- November 24 – Ikeogu Oke, Nigerian poet and writer of children's literature who received the 2017 Nigeria Prize for Literature, 51 (born 1967)
- November 25 – Paul Ellingworth, Scottish biblical scholar and translator, 87 (born 1931)
  - Philip Levine, American classicist, 96 (born 1922)
  - Claude Péloquin, Québécois poet, 76 (born 1942)
- November 26 – Luc Deflo, Belgian writer, 60 (born 1958)
  - Iravatham Mahadevan, Indian epigraphist noted for his successful decipherment of Tamil-Brahmi inscriptions and expertise on Indus Valley civilisation epigraphy, 88 (born 1930)
  - Leo P. Ribuffo, American historian, 72–73 (born 1945)
  - Goran Stefanovski, Macedonian playwright, 66 (born 1952)
  - Barbara Brooks Wallace, American writer of children's literature, 95 (born 1922)
- November 28 – Thomas J. J. Altizer, American radical theologian noted for his contribution to the short-lived "God is dead" cultural moment experienced by that country, 91 (born 1927)
  - Blaže Ristovski, Macedonian folklorist, historian, linguist and member of the Macedonian Academy of Sciences and Arts, 87 (born 1931)
  - Harry Leslie Smith, English memoirist, 95 (born 1923)
- November 29 – Elisa Brune, Belgian writer, 52 (born 1966)
  - Altaf Fatima, Pakistani Urdu novelist and short story writer, 91 (born 1927)
  - Miguel Romero Esteo, Spanish professor and playwright, 88 (born 1930)
- November 30 – Attash Durrani, Pakistani linguist and scholar noted for his work on Urdu language and literature, 66 (born 1952)
- December 1
  - Ivan Katardžiev, Macedonian historian, 92 (born 1926)
  - Pauls Putniņš, Latvian playwright, journalist and politician, 81 (born 1937)
- December 2 – Séry Bailly, Ivorian writer and politician, 70 (born 1948)
- December 3
  - Andrei Bitov, Russian novelist and short story writer of Circassian ancestry, 81 (born 1937)
  - Justin Cartwright MBE FRSL, South African-born British Booker Prize-shortlisted novelist, 75 (born 1943)
  - Hans-Günther Thalheim, German linguist and writer noted for work on the eighteenth century (especially the Sturm und Drang phase of the German classicist movement; Schiller; Winckelmann; Goethe Kleist), 94 (born 1924)
- December 4 – Nh. Dini, Indonesian feminist novelist, 82 (born 1936)
- December 5 – Julia Vinograd, American street poet, graduate of the Iowa Writers' Workshop and Berkeley's unofficial poet laureate, 74 (born 1943)
- December 6
  - Kuslan Budiman, Indonesian poet and fiction writer, 83 (born 1935)
  - Joseph Joffo, French novelist noted for a widely translated memoir, A Bag of Marbles, 87 (born 1931)
  - Murray Murphey, American historian, philosopher and advocate of social sciences, 90 (born 1928)
- December 8 – Jamal Nebez, Iraqi Kurdish linguist, mathematician and translator of Gogol and Shakespeare into Kurdish, 85 (born 1933)
- December 9
  - William Blum, American historian (Killing Hope, Rogue State), 85 (born 1933)
  - Tor Fretheim, Norwegian writer of children's literature and recipient of the 1986 Norwegian Critics Prize for Best Children's Book, 72 (born 1946)
- December 10
  - Mushirul Hasan, Indian historian, 69 (born 1949)
  - Robert Spaemann, German Roman Catholic philosopher seen as a member of the Ritter school, whose work focused on Christian ethics, 91 (born 1927)
  - Xavier Tilliette, French philosopher and theologian, 97 (born 1921)
- December 11
  - Harold L. Kahn, American historian focusing on Imperial China, 88 (born 1930)
  - Lia Wyler, Brazilian translator of Harry Potter series, 84 (born 1934)
- December 12
  - Wilhelm Genazino, German novelist, 2004 Georg Büchner Prize recipient and 2007 Kleist Prize recipient, 75 (born 1943)
  - Meng Lang (孟浪), Chinese poet and promoter of dissidents such as Liu Xiaobo, 57 (born 1961)
- December 15
  - Eryue He (二月河), Chinese historical fiction writer, 73 (born 1945)
  - Jacques Verdier, French novelist, 61 (born 1957)
- December 19 – Bhai, Surinamese poet, 83 (born 1935)
- December 20 – F. W. Bernstein, German poet and 2008 Wilhelm Busch Prize recipient, 80 (born 1938)
- December 21 – Tom Leonard, Scottish poet writing in Glaswegian dialect, 74 (born 1944 with Alasdair Gray and James Kelman)
- December 22
  - Gary N. Knoppers, Canadian theologian noted for work on 1 Chronicles, 62 (born 1956)
  - Jane Langton, American writer of children's literature and detective fiction, 95 (born 1922)
  - Roger Owen, English historian noted for work on Middle East, 83 (born 1935)
- December 23 – Eileen Battersby, American-born Irish literary critic known for advocating fiction in translation, 60 (born c. 1958)
- December 24 – Osvaldo Bayer, Argentine "ultra-pacifist anarchist" novelist, 91 (born 1927)
- December 25
  - Nirendranath Chakravarty, Indian poet and writer about the fictional detective Bhaduri Moshai, 94 (born 1924)
  - Baldur Ragnarsson, Icelandic poet and writer of Esperanto works, 88 (born 1930)
  - Rosalyn Terborg-Penn, American writer on African American women, 77 (born 1941)
  - Terence Wheeler, English novelist and playwright, 82 (born 1936)
- December 26 – Elizabeth Zachariadou, Greek historian of Turkish studies, notably the early Ottoman Empire (c. 1300–1600), 87 (born 1931)
- December 27 – Wilfred Shuchat, Canadian scholar and rabbi, 98 (born 1920)
- December 28
  - Seydou Badian Kouyaté, Malian novelist and lyricist of his country's national anthem "Le Mali", 90 (born 1928)
  - Amos Oz, Israeli novelist, memoirist, etc., recipient of 2005 Goethe Prize and 2013 Franz Kafka Prize, 79 (born 1939)
- December 30 – Edgar Hilsenrath, German novelist ranged from the grotesque (The Nazi and the Barber) to the poetic (The Story of the Last Thought), 92 (born 1926)
- December 31 – Gülriz Sururi, Turkish novelist, memoirist and essayist, 89 (born 1929)

== Awards ==
The following list is arranged alphabetically:

- Folio Prize: Richard Lloyd Parry, Ghosts Of The Tsunami: Death and Life in Japan's Disaster Zone
- Friedenspreis des Deutschen Buchhandels: Aleida and Jan Assmann
- German Book Prize: Inger-Maria Mahlke for Archipel
- Governor General's Award for English-language fiction: Sarah Henstra, The Red Word
- Governor General's Award for French-language fiction: Karoline Georges, De synthèse
- International Prize for Arabic Fiction:
- Lambda Literary Awards: Multiple categories; see 30th Lambda Literary Awards.

Award	Category	Date	Author	Nominated work	Date Published	Ref
Akutagawa Prize		Jul 18, 2018	Hiroki Takahashi	Okuribi (Ceremonial Fire)		
Akutagawa Prize		Jan 17, 2019	Ryōhei Machiya	1R 1-Pun 34-Byō (1 round 1 minute 34 seconds)		
Akutagawa Prize		Jan 17, 2019	Takahiro Ueda	Nimuroddo (Nimrod)		
America Award in Literature			Haruki Murakami	—	—	
Andre Norton Award			Sam J. Miller	The Art of Starving	Jul 11, 2017	
Anisfield-Wolf Book Award	Fiction		Jesmyn Ward	Sing, Unburied, Sing	Sep 5, 2017	
Anisfield-Wolf Book Award	Nonfiction		Kevin Young	Bunk: The Rise of Hoaxes...	Nov 14, 2017	
Anisfield-Wolf Book Award	Poetry		Shane McCrae	In the Language of My Captor	Feb 7, 2017	
Anisfield-Wolf Book Award	Lifetime Achievement		N. Scott Momaday	—	—	
Arthur C. Clarke Award			Anne Charnock	Dreams Before the Start of Time	Apr 18, 2017	
Astounding Award for Best New Writer			Rebecca Roanhorse	"Welcome to Your Authentic Indian Experience"		
Atwood Gibson Writers' Trust Fiction Prize			Kathy Page	Dear Evelyn		
Baillie Gifford Prize			Serhii Plokhy	Chernobyl: History of a Tragedy		
BBC National Short Story Award			Ingrid Persaud	"The Sweet Sop"		
Bookseller/Diagram Prize for Oddest Title of the Year			Achse Verlag	The Joy of Waterboiling		
Booker Prize	Booker Prize		Anna Burns	Milkman	Sep 20, 2018	
Booker Prize	International Booker Prize		Olga Tokarczuk	Flights	2017	
Bram Stoker Award	BSA–Best (Horror) Novel		Paul G. Tremblay	The Cabin at the End of the World	Jun 26, 2018	
British Book Awards	Author of the Year	May 14, 2018	Philip Pullman	—	—	
British Book Awards	Book of the Year	May 14, 2018	Gail Honeyman	Eleanor Oliphant is Completely Fine	May 9, 2017	
British Book Awards	Children's Book of the Year	May 14, 2018	Robert Macfarlane and Jackie Morris	The Lost Words		
British Book Awards	Children's Book of the Year	May 14, 2018	Angie Thomas	The Hate U Give		
British Book Awards	Fiction Book of the Year	May 14, 2018	Jon McGregor	Reservoir 13		
British Book Awards	Crime & Thriller	May 14, 2018	Jane Harper	The Dry		
British Book Awards	Nonfiction Narrative	May 14, 2018	Reni Eddo-Lodge	Why I'm No Longer Talking to White People About Race		
British Fantasy Award	Fantasy Novel (Robert Holdstock Award)		Jen Williams	The Ninth Rain		
British Fantasy Award	British Fantasy Award for Best Horror Novel (August Derleth Award)		Victor LaValle	The Changeling		
British Fantasy Award	Novella		Ellen Klages	Passing Strange		
British Fantasy Award	Short Story		Laura Mauro	"Looking for Laika"		
British Fantasy Award	Collection		Joe Hill	Strange Weather		
British Fantasy Award	Anthology		Mark Morris, ed.	New Fears		
British Fantasy Award	Non-fiction		F. T. Barbini, ed.	Gender Identity and Sexuality in Science Fiction and Fantasy		
Caine Prize for African Writing			Makena Onjerika	"Fanta Blackcurrant"		
Camões Prize			Germano Almeida	—	—	
Carl Zuckmayer Medal			Yoko Tawada	—	—	
Carnegie Medal			Geraldine McCaughrean	Where the World Ends		
Center for Fiction First Novel Prize			Tommy Orange	There There		
Costa Book Awards	Costa Book of the Year		Bart van Es	The Cut Out Girl: A Story of War...		
Costa Book Awards	Costa–Biography		Bart van Es	The Cut Out Girl: A Story of War...		
Costa Book Awards	Costa–Novel		Sally Rooney	Normal People		
Costa Book Awards	Costa–Children's Book		Hilary McKay	The Skylarks' War		
Costa Book Awards	Costa–First Novel		Stuart Turton	The Seven Deaths of Evelyn Hardcastle		
Costa Book Awards	Costa–Poetry		J. O. Morgan	Assurances		
Danuta Gleed Literary Award			Norma Dunning	Annie Muktuk and Other Stories		
David Cohen Prize		—	— (No award given)		—	
Dayne Ogilvie Prize			Ben Ladouceur	—	—	
Desmond Elliott Prize			Preti Taneja	We That Are Young		
DSC Prize for South Asian Literature			Jayanth Kaikini	No Presents Please		
Dylan Thomas Prize			Kayo Chingonyi	Kumukanda		
Edgar Awards	Best Novel		Attica Locke	Bluebird, Bluebird		
Eugie Award			Fran Wilde	"Clearly Lettered in a Mostly Steady Hand"		
European Book Prize	European Book Prize (Novel)		Géraldine Schwarz	Those Who Forget		
European Book Prize	European Book Prize (Essay)		Philippe Sands	East West Street		
Folio Prize			Richard Lloyd Parry	Ghosts of the Tsunami: Death and Life in Japan's Disaster Zone		
Franz Kafka Prize			Ivan Wernisch	—	—	
Giller Prize			Esi Edugyan	Washington Black		
Goldsmiths Prize			Robin Robertson	The Long Take		
Gordon Burn Prize			Jesse Ball	Census		
Governor General's Awards	Governor General's Award for English-language fiction		Sarah Henstra	The Red Word		
Governor General's Awards	Governor General's Award for French-language fiction		Karoline Georges	De synthèse		
Governor General's Awards	Governor General's Awards, other categories	—	—	—	—	—
Grand Prix du roman de l'Académie française			Camille Pascal	L'Été des quatre rois		
Hilary Weston Writers' Trust Prize for Nonfiction			Elizabeth Hay	All Things Consoled: A Daughter's Memoir		
Holberg Prize			Cass Sunstein	—	—	
Hugo Award	Best Novel		N. K. Jemisin	The Stone Sky		
Hugo Award	Best Novella		Martha Wells	All Systems Red		
Hugo Award	Best Novelette		Suzanne Palmer	"The Secret Life of Bots"		
Hugo Award	Best Short Story		Rebecca Roanhorse	"Welcome to Your Authentic Indian Experience"		
Hurston/Wright Legacy Award	Fiction		Alain Mabanckou	Black Moses		
Hurston/Wright Legacy Award	Nonfiction		Tiya Miles	The Dawn of Detroit		
Hurston/Wright Legacy Award	Debut		Ladee Hubbard	The Talented Ribkins		
Hurston/Wright Legacy Award	Poetry		Evie Shockley	semiautomatic		
International Dublin Literary Award			Mike McCormack	Solar Bones		
James Tait Black Memorial Prize	Fiction		Olivia Laing	Crudo		
James Tait Black Memorial Prize	Biography		Lindsey Hilsum	In Extremis: The Life and Death of the War Correspondent Marie Colvin		
James Tait Black Memorial Prize	Drama		Clare Barron	Dance Nation		
Jerusalem Prize		—	— (No award given)		—	
Kerry Group Irish Fiction Award			Paul Lynch	Grace		
Latner Writers' Trust Poetry Prize			Jordan Scott	—	—	
Matt Cohen Award			David Bergen	—	—	
Miguel de Cervantes Prize			Ida Vitale	—	—	
Miles Franklin Award			Michelle de Kretser	The Life to Come		
National Biography Award			Judith Brett	The Enigmatic Mr Deakin		
National Book Award	National Book Award–Fiction		Sigrid Nunez	The Friend		
National Book Award	National Book Award–Nonfiction		Jeffrey C. Stewart	The New Negro: The Life of Alain Locke		
National Book Award	National Book Award–Poetry		Justin Phillip Reed	Indecency		
National Book Award	National Book Award–Translated Literature		Yoko Tawada	The Emissary		
National Book Award	National Book Award–Young People's Literature		Elizabeth Acevedo	The Poet X		
National Book Critics Circle Award	National Book Critics–Fiction		Anna Burns	Milkman		
National Book Critics Circle Award	National Book Critics–Nonfiction		Steve Coll	Directorate S: The C.I.A. and America's...		
National Book Critics Circle Award	National Book Critics–Biography		Christopher Bonanos	Flash: The Making of Weegee the Famous		
National Book Critics Circle Award	National Book Critics–Criticism		Zadie Smith	Feel Free: Essays		
Nebula Award	Best Novel		N. K. Jemisin	The Stone Sky		
Nebula Award	Best Novella		Martha Wells	All Systems Red		
Nebula Award	Best Novelette		Kelly Robson	"A Human Stain"		
Nebula Award	Best Short Story		Rebecca Roanhorse	"Welcome to Your Authentic Indian Experience"		
New Academy Prize in Literature			Maryse Condé	—	—	
Newbery Medal			Erin Entrada Kelly	Hello, Universe		
Nike Award	Jury Award		Marcin Wicha	Rzeczy, których nie wyrzuciłem		
Nike Award	Audience Award		Marcin Wicha	Rzeczy, których nie wyrzuciłem		
Nobel Prize in Literature			Olga Tokarczuk	—	—	
Orwell Prize			Darren McGarvey	Poverty Safari		
PEN/Faulkner Award for Fiction			Joan Silber	Improvement		
Philip K. Dick Award	Winner		Audrey Schulman	Theory of Bastards		
Philip K. Dick Award	Special Citation		Claire North	84K		
Premio Planeta de Novela			Santiago Posteguillo	Yo, Julia		
Premio Strega Prize			Helena Janeczek	La ragazza con la Leica		
Pritzker Literature Award			Dennis Showalter	—	—	
Prix Femina	Prix Femina		Philippe Lançon	Le Lambeau		
Prix Femina	Prix Femina étranger		Alice McDermott	The Ninth Hour		
Prix Femina	Prix Femina essai		Élisabeth de Fontenay	Gaspard de la nuit		
Prix Femina	Prix Femina des lycéens		Isabelle Desesquelles	Je voudrais que la nuit me prenne		
Prix Goncourt			Nicolas Mathieu	And Their Children After Them		
Prix Médicis			Pierre Guyotat	Idiotie		
Prix Renaudot			Valérie Manteau	Le Sillon		
Pulitzer Prize	Pulitzer Prize for Fiction		Andrew Sean Greer	Less		
Pulitzer Prize	Pulitzer Prize for Drama		Martyna Majok	Cost of Living		
Pulitzer Prize	Pulitzer Prize for Nonfiction		James Forman Jr.	Locking Up Our Own: Crime and Punishment in Black America		
Pulitzer Prize	Pulitzer Prize for History		Jack E. Davis	The Gulf: The Making of an American Sea		
Pulitzer Prize	Pulitzer Prize for Biography		Caroline Fraser	Prairie Fires: The American Dreams of Laura Ingalls Wilder		
RBC Taylor Prize			Tanya Talaga	Seven Fallen Feathers		
SAARC Literary Award			Najibullah Manalai	—	—	
Struga Poetry Evenings	Golden Wreath laureate		Adam Zagajewski	—	—	
Struga Poetry Evenings	Bridges of Struga laureate		Pauli Tapio	—	—	
Walter Scott Prize			Benjamin Myers	The Gallows Pole		
Whiting Awards	Fiction		Brontez Purnell	—	—	
Whiting Awards	Fiction		Patrick Cottrell	—	—	
Whiting Awards	Drama		Nathan Alan Davis	—	—	
Whiting Awards	Drama		Hansol Jung	—	—	
Whiting Awards	Drama		Antoinette Nwandu	—	—	
Whiting Awards	Nonfiction		Anne Boyer	—	—	
Whiting Awards	Nonfiction		Esmé Weijun Wang	—	—	
Whiting Awards	Nonfiction		Weike Wang	—	—	
Whiting Awards	Poetry		Anne Boyer	—	—	
Whiting Awards	Poetry		Rickey Laurentiis	—	—	
Whiting Awards	Poetry		Tommy Pico	—	—	
Women's Prize for Fiction			Kamila Shamsie	Home Fire		
World Fantasy Award	Novel		Victor LaValle	The Changeling		
World Fantasy Award	Novel		Fonda Lee	Jade City		
World Fantasy Award	Novella		Ellen Klages	Passing Strange		
World Fantasy Award	Short Fiction		Natalia Theodoridou	"The Birding: A Fairy Tale"		
World Fantasy Award	Collection		Jane Yolen	The Emerald Circus		
Writers' Trust Engel/Findley Award			Alissa York	—	—	
W. Y. Boyd Literary Award for Excellence in Military Fiction			Jeff Shaara	The Frozen Hours: A Novel of the Korean War		
Zbigniew Herbert International Literary Award			Nuala Ní Dhomhnaill	—	—	
