= Steven Collins (Buddhist studies scholar) =

British-born Buddhist studies scholar

- Born: 16 September 1951; England
- Died: 15 February 2018 (aged 66); New Zealand
- Known for: Work on Theravada Buddhism

Academic background
- Education: University of Oxford

Academic work
- Discipline: Buddhology, religious studies
- Institutions: University of Bristol; University of Chicago

Steven Collins (16 September 1951 – 15 February 2018) was a British-born Buddhist studies scholar, who made noteworthy contributions to the study of Theravada Buddhism and Pali Buddhist Literature. He was the Chester D. Tripp Professor in the Humanities in the University of Chicago’s Department of South Asian Languages and Civilizations, and in the Divinity School’s History of Religions program.

== Background ==
Steven Collins grew up in north London, England, with Irish Catholic ancestry. He gained a double-first degree at Christ Church, University of Oxford, going on to earn a master's degree and doctorate (DPhil) there. He lectured at the University of Bristol before joining the University of Chicago faculty in 1991, where he was named the Chester D. Tripp Professor in the Humanities.

== Death ==
Collins died in New Zealand, where he was attending a seminar, on 15 February 2018, at the age of 66.

== Bibliography ==
- Selfless Persons: Imagery and Thought in Theravāda Buddhism (1981)
- The Category of the Person: Anthropology, Philosophy, History (editor, 1986)
- Nirvana and Other Buddhist Felicities (1998)
- A Pali Grammar for Students (2006)
- Nirvana: Concept, Imagery, Narrative (2010)
- Civilisation et femmes célibataires dans le Bouddhisme en asie du sud et du sud-est: une 'étude de genre' (2011)
- Self and Society: Essays on Pali Literature and Social Theory, 1988-2010 (2014)
- Readings of the Vessantara Jātaka (editor, 2016)
- Theravāda Buddhist Encounters with Modernity (editor, 2017)
- Wisdom as a Way of Life: Theravāda Buddhism Reimagined (2020)
