= Harold L. Kahn =

American historian (1930–2018)

- Born: November 15, 1930; Poughkeepsie, New York, U.S.
- Died: December 11, 2018 (aged 88); San Francisco, California, U.S.

Academic background
- Education: Williams College; Harvard University

Academic work
- Discipline: Historian
- Institutions: SOAS, University of London; Stanford University
- Main interests: History of China

Harold L. Kahn (November 15, 1930 – December 11, 2018) was an American historian. He was a professor of Chinese History at Stanford University, and the author of a book about Imperial China.

== Early life ==
Kahn was born on November 15, 1930, in Poughkeepsie, New York. He graduated from Williams College, and he earned a PhD in history from Harvard University.

== Career ==
Kahn began his career as a History professor at the SOAS, University of London. He taught Chinese History at Stanford University from 1968 to 1998. The Kahn-Van Slyke Award for Graduate Mentorship and the Harold Kahn Reading Room at Stanford University were named in his honor. Kahn authored a book about Imperial China.

Kahn was opposed to United States involvement in the Vietnam War.

== Death ==
Kahn died on December 11, 2018, in San Francisco.

== Selected works ==
- Kahn, Harold L. (1971). Monarchy in the Emperor's Eyes: Image and Reality in the Ch'ien-lung Reign. Cambridge, Massachusetts: Harvard University Press. OCLC 470209346.
