= Donald Read =

British historian (1930–2018)

- Born: 31 July 1930
- Died: 1 October 2018 (aged 88); Blackpool, England
- Occupation: Historian

Donald Read (31 July 1930 – 1 October 2018) was a British historian. He was emeritus Professor of Modern English History at the University of Kent and in 1988 was appointed to write the authorised history of Reuters. Read died in 2018 at the age of 88 in Blackpool.

== Education ==
- Manchester, Green End, elementary schools (1934–41); William Hulme's Grammar School, Manchester (1941–9); University College, Oxford (1949–55).

== Career ==
- Research Studentship in Arts, University College, Hull (1954–5); Knoop Research Fellowship in Economic History, University of Sheffield (1955–6); assistant lecturer (1956), lecturer (1958) in modern history, University of Leeds (1956–65); senior lecturer (1965), reader (1969), Professor of Modern English History (1974), University of Kent (1965–90); Emeritus Professor (1990–2018).
- National President of the Historical Association (1985–8); company historian at Reuters, London (1988–2001).

== Books ==
- Peterloo: The Massacre and its Background (Manchester: Manchester University Press, 1958, 1973).
- Press and People 1790–1850: Opinion in Three English Cities (London: Arnold, 1961, 1993).
- [with E.H.L. Glasgow] Feargus O'Connor: Irishman and Chartist (London: Arnold, 1961).
- The English Provinces, 1760-1960: A Study in Influence (London: Arnold, 1964).
- Cobden and Bright: A Victorian Political Partnership (London: Arnold, 1967).
- Edwardian England 1901-15: Society and Politics (London: Harrap, 1972).
- [ed.] Documents from Edwardian England, 1901-1915 (London: Harrap, 1973).
- England 1868-1914 (London: Longman, 1979, revised 1994 as The Age of Urban Democracy).
- [ed.] Edwardian England (London: Croom Helm, with the Historical Association, 1982).
- Peel and the Victorians (Oxford: Blackwell, 1987).
- The Power of News: The History of Reuters (Oxford: Oxford University Press, 1992, 2nd ed. 1999).
- A Manchester Boyhood in the Thirties and Forties: Growing up in War and Peace (Lampeter: Edwin Mellen Press, 2003).
- All You Need is Love: A Campus Tale (Sussex: Book Guild, 2010).
- Clever By Half: Learning and Loving in a Fifties University (Sussex: Book Guild, 2012).
- Never Trust Professors: Life and Death on Campus (Sussex: Book Guild, 2016).

== Articles ==
This list excludes numerous book reviews, which appeared especially in Northern History from its start in 1965

- "The Social and Economic Background to Peterloo" (Trans. Lancs. & Ches. Antiq. Soc., LXIV (1954), pp. 1–18 (1954).
- "Manchester News-Letter: A Discovery at Oxford" (Manchester Review, 8 (1957), pp. 1–5) (reprinted from Manchester Guardian, 31 August 1956).
- "Lancashire's Hampden Clubs: A Spy's Narrative" (Manchester Review, 8 (1957), pp. 83–7) (revised from Manchester Guardian, 2 October 1956).
- "John Harland: The Father of Provincial Reporting" (Manchester Review, 8 (1958), pp. 205–12) (revised from Manchester Guardian, 4 September 1957).
- "North of England Newspapers and their Value to Historians" (Proc. Leeds Phil. & Lit. Soc., VIII (1957), pp. 200–15).
- "Robert Owen, 1771-1858: From Manchester to Utopia" (Manchester Review, 8 (1959), pp. 317–20) (reprinted from Manchester Guardian, 17 November 1958).
- "Reform Newspapers and Northern Opinion, c.1800-c.1848" (Proc.Leeds Phil. & Lit. Soc., VIII (1959), pp. 301–14).
- "Feargus O'Connor: Irishman and Chartist" (History Today, XI (1961), pp. 165–74).
- "The Use of Local History: The Local History of Modern Times" (Amateur Historian, 6 no.4 (1964), pp. 121–24).
- "Travelling the North" (Northern History, III (1968), pp. 219–22).
- "Introduction" to the Third Edition of Archibald Prentice, Historical Sketches and Personal Recollections of Manchester (Cass, 1970) (pp.v-xvii)
- "The New Cities" (in History of the English Speaking Peoples (Purnell, 1971), pp. 3388–95).
- "History: Political and Diplomatic" (in C.B. Cox & A.E. Dyson [eds.] The Twentieth Century Mind, I: 1900-1918 (OUP, 1972), pp. 1–50).
- "Edwardian England" (Historical Association Pamphlet G79 (1972) 56pp.).
- "Bright, John" (in Encyclopaedia Britannica, 15th ed. (1974), vol.2, pp. 517–18).
- "Introduction: Crisis Age or Golden Age" 'in D. Read [ed.], Edwardian England (Croom Helm, 1982), pp. 14–39).
- "President's Page" (in The Historian [Historical Association], nos.6–17 (1985–88)).
- "Sir Roderick Jones and Reuters: Rise and Fall of a News Emperor" (in D. Fraser [ed.], Cities, Class and Communications, Essays in Honour of Asa Briggs (Harvester, 1990), pp. 175–99).
- "War News from Reuters: Victorian and Edwardian Reporting" (Despatches, 4 (1993), pp. 72–85).
- "Reuters: News Agency of the British Empire" (Contemporary Record, 8 (1994), pp. 195–212).
- "Truth in News: Reuters and the Manchester Guardian, 1858-1964" (Northern History, 31 (1995), pp. 281–97).
- "Reuters and South Africa: South Africa is a country of monopolies" (South African Journal of Economic History, 11 (1996), pp. 104–43).
- "Sir Christopher Chancellor" (Dictionary of National Biography, 1986-1990 (OUP, 1996), pp. 65–6).
- "The Local History Committee: A Very Personal Retrospect" (The Historian [Historical Association], no.54 (1997), pp. 16–17).
- "The Impact of Electric News 1846-1914: The Role of Reuters" (in F.A.J.L. James [ed.], Semaphores to Short Waves (RSA, 1998), pp. 121–35).
- "Obituary, Gerald Long, 1923-1998" (The Independent, 14 November 1998).
- "The Relationship of Reuters and other News Agencies with the British Press, 1858-1984: Service at Cost or Business for Profit?" (in P. Caterall et al. [eds.], Northcliffe's Legacy, Aspects of the British Popular Press, 1896-1996 (Macmillan, 2000), pp. 149–68).
- "Don't Blame the Messengers: News Agencies Past and Present" (The Historian [Historical Association], no.69 (spring 2001), pp. 9–15).
- "A Parade of Past Presidents 1906–1982" (The Historian [Historical Association], no.91 (autumn 2006), pp. 10–23).
- "New Universities of the Sixties, One Professor’s Recollections: Glad Confident Morning and After" (The Historian [Historical Association], no.114 (summer 2012), pp. 28–31).
- "Obituary, Asa Briggs, 1921-2016" (The Historian [Historical Association], no.129 (spring 2016), p. 37).
