= Lionello Puppi =

Italian politician (1931–2018)

Lionello Puppi (22 December 1931 – 15 September 2018) was an Italian art historian and politician.

A native of Belluno born in 1931, he later moved to Conegliano. He began teaching at the University of Padua in 1971. He left for the Ca' Foscari University of Venice in 1991, and retired as professor emeritus in 2005.

He represented the Italian Communist Party in the Senate from 1985 to 1987, replacing Antonino Papalia, who died in office. Puppi died in Treviso at the age of 86 on 15 September 2018.
