= Terence Wheeler =

British writer

Terence Wheeler (also known as Terry Wheeler and T.E.R. Wheeler) (1936 – 25 December 2018) was a British writer. His debut novel The Conjunction set in India was shortlisted for the Booker Prize in 1970. He published two other novels, From Home in Heaven (1971) also set in India and The Wreck of the Rat Trap (1973) set in Portsmouth where he grew up. He wrote two screen plays titled Spice Island, Farewell and Brent Geese both of which were broadcast by the BBC in the nineteen seventies. He also wrote short stories two of which "The Philadelphia Connection" and "Safe Wintering" were published by Macmillan in their annual collection Winter's Tales (1979 and 1981 respectively).

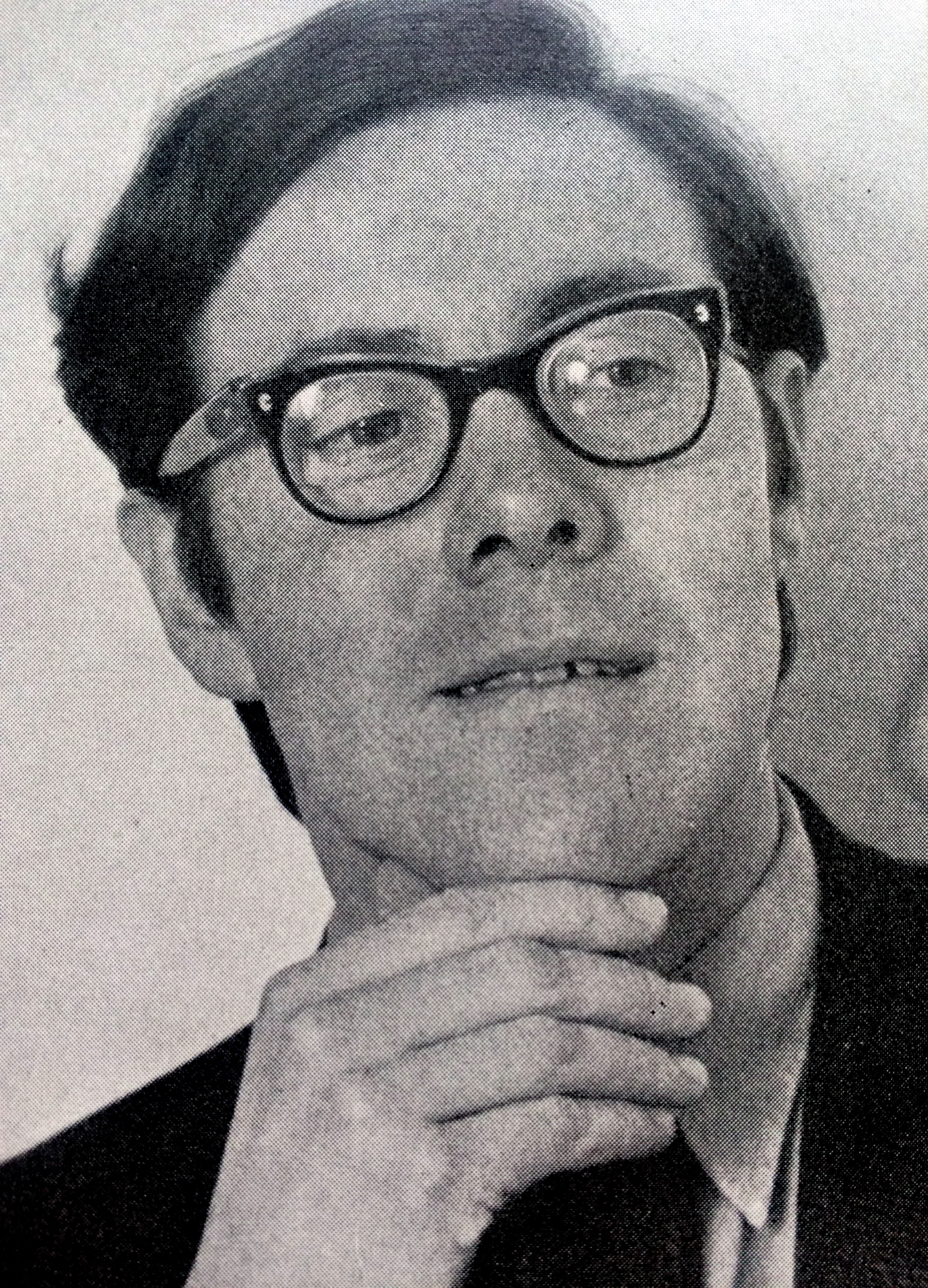
Terence Wheeler, 1973 (photo by Tom Parker)

He lived in Whitstable, Kent and died on 25 December 2018 at the age of 82.

== Early life and education ==
Wheeler was born in Portsmouth, England in 1936. His parents were Eddie and Florrie Wheeler and he had a brother Barry.

Eddie was a worker in Portsmouth dockyard and joined the Marines in 1941.

As a naval dockyard, Portsmouth was subjected to heavy bombing during the war. To escape the bombs, Florrie evacuated the two brothers to comparatively rural Waterlooville. Wheeler's experiences during the war years formed the basis for his third novel, The Wreck of the Rat Trap.

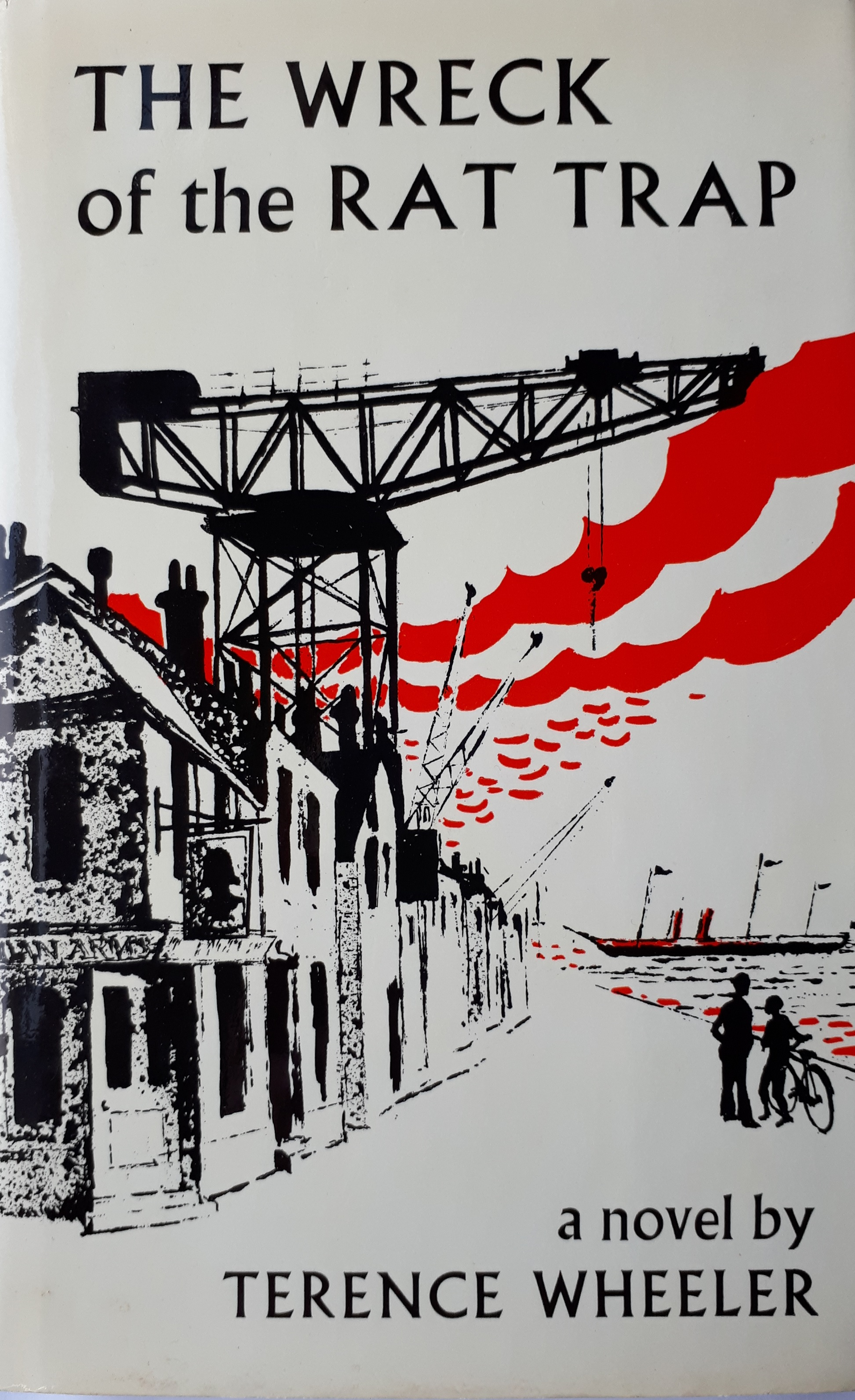
The Wreck of the Rat Trap. Cover design by Sara Wheeler.

Despite being active and staunch Marxists, Eddie and Florrie sent Wheeler to a Roman Catholic primary school where they thought he would get a good education. The dissonance between the Marxism of home and the traditional Catholic doctrine of school was intense for him. Nonetheless, he excelled, passed his eleven-plus exam and progressed to a local grammar school.

The years at grammar school were productive thanks to the influence of his charismatic English master who fed his love of literature and enabled him to gain a place at Oxford to read English.

The public school culture of Oxford was a shock for the boy from Portsmouth. However, he immersed himself into the world of the University Dramatic Society. His time at Oxford cemented his love of words and language and his practical knowledge of the theatre.

Wheeler graduated from Oxford and took up his first teaching post at a comprehensive school in Holloway.

Whilst at Oxford, Wheeler met Sara Tooze whom he married in 1959. Their marriage lasted nearly 60 years and together they had a son and two daughters.

Sara, an artist trained at Goldsmiths College of Art in London, designed the covers of two of Wheeler's books.

== India ==
Shortly after his marriage to Sara and keen to broaden their horizons, Wheeler found a job in Buenos Aires only to receive a message just before they set sail saying, "There's been a revolution. Job not available."

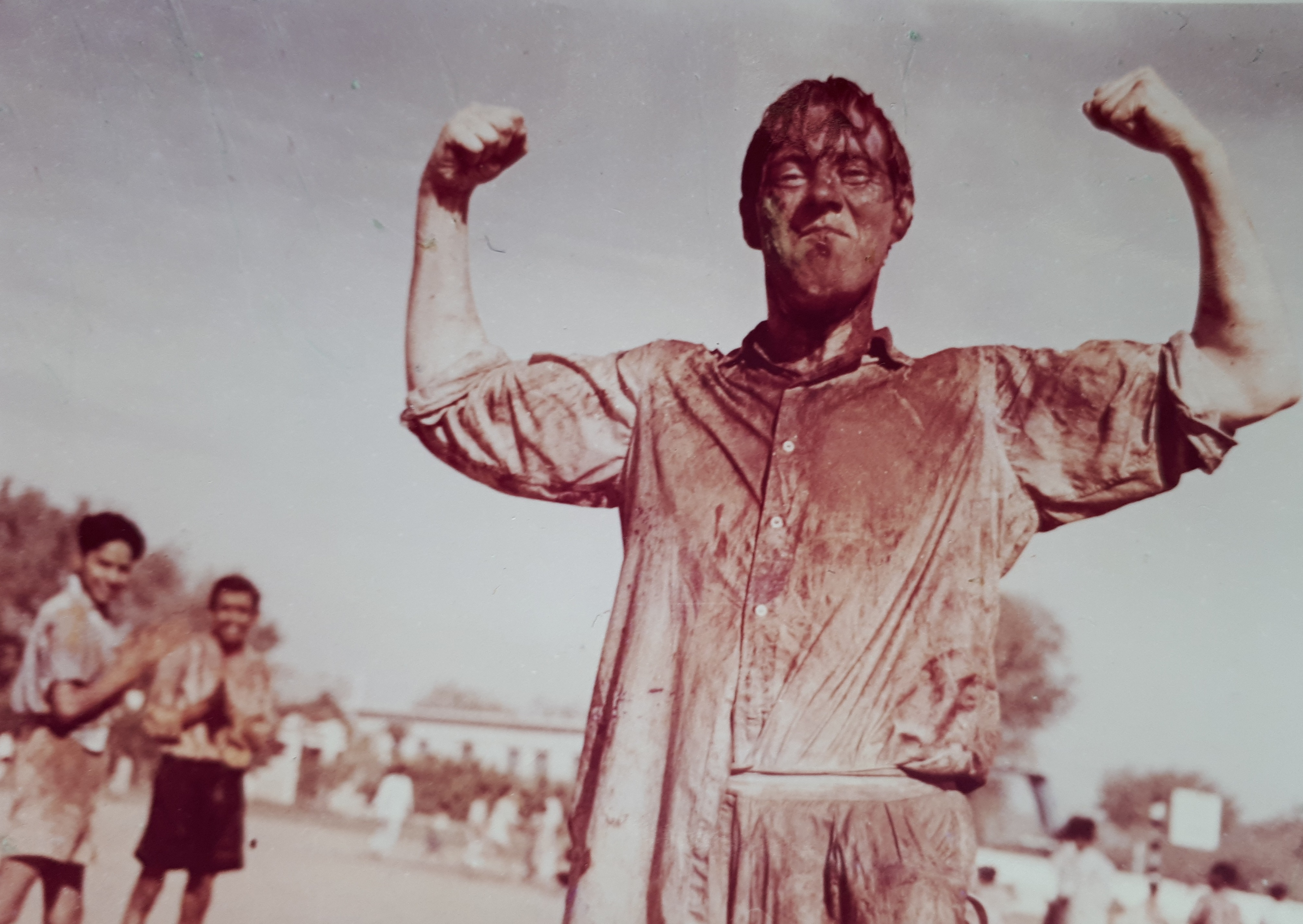
Wheeler celebrating Holi, the festival of colour, with some of the boys he taught in Pilani, India (circa 1961).

Undeterred, Wheeler then found a 3-year teaching post at Pilani Public School in the middle of the Rajasthan desert in North India. They (with their new born daughter, Rachel) set sail for Bombay (now Mumbai).

During their time in India, Wheeler came to see that the anti-colonialist Marxism of his upbringing was in contrast to the influence of the British Raj - the legal system, education, railway infrastructure and even the medical and educational work of the missionaries. His observations prompted him to write his first novel, The Conjunction.

The book tells of a divided man educated in India and England and facing discordant world views: traditional Hindu caste attitudes and modern democratic ones, superstitions about pollution and purity against modern medical views. The book was shortlisted for the Booker Prize in 1970.

Another novel From Home in Heaven also set in India followed in 1971.

== America ==
On returning to England, Wheeler held various teaching posts before taking up a position in 1968 at the then new Christ Church College, Canterbury founded to train Anglican teachers. There he lectured in 18th century and later modern literature.

The family had by now moved to Whitstable "because it was the cheapest place in England". There Wheeler became heavily involved in amateur dramatics directing many productions from Restoration Comedy to Gorky.

In 1974 Wheeler took up a one-year exchange lectureship at Villanova University in Philadelphia. Wheeler departed England again with Sara and now their three children (Rachel, Charlotte and Matthew).

At the end of the year (and as a result of a wager) Wheeler took the family on a month long road trip from Philadelphia to Mexico City camping all the way and listening to John Denver singing Take Me Home, Country Roads on the radio.

Wheeler relished encountering characters on the journey such as a Louisiana peanut farmer who invited them to shell a pan of nuts.

The trip inspired his short stories. Macmillan published two of these in their prestigious annual collections by leading authors called Winter's Tales. The first, "The Philadelphia Connection" in 1979 and the second "Safe Wintering" in 1981. His fellow contributors to Winter's Tales included Martin Amis, John Wain and Fay Weldon.

== Later life ==
In 1982, Wheeler stopped writing altogether, partly due to his growing administrative duties as a lecturer. But also, he said, “It just didn’t seem important any more”.

He remained a lecturer at Christ Church College (now a university) until retirement.

In retirement, he devoted himself to animal welfare, collecting for and assisting at local animal sanctuaries.

== Works ==
=== Novels ===
- The Conjunction, Angus & Robertson Ltd, London (1969)
- From Home In Heaven, Macmillan Ltd, London (1971)
- The Wreck of the Rat-Trap, Macmillan Ltd, London (1973)

=== Short stories ===
- "The Philadelphia Connection", Winter's Tales 25, Macmillan Ltd, London (1979)
- "Safe Wintering", Winter's Tales 27, Macmillan Ltd, London (1981)

=== Screenplays ===
- Brent Geese (1975)
- Spice Island, Farewell (1976)
