= Anya Krugovoy Silver =

American writer

Anya Krugovoy Silver (December 22, 1968 – August 6, 2018) was an American poet. She won a Guggenheim fellowship, and a Georgia Author of the Year Award.

== Biography ==
Silver was born in 1968 in Media, Pennsylvania, but raised in Swarthmore, and graduated from Haverford College, and Emory University. She then became a professor at Mercer University. Her work has appeared in The Christian Century, among other publications.

In 2004, Silver was pregnant and teaching at Mercer University when she was diagnosed with inflammatory breast cancer. She gave birth to her son Noah and had a mastectomy. The cancer remained, and her coping with it, along with her son and husband, intensified her poetry.

Silver died at age 49 in Macon, Georgia, on August 6, 2018.

== Works ==
- ''Scattered at Sea'', Penguin/Penguin Random House, ISBN 9780143126898
- The Ninety-Third Name of God, Baton Rouge : Louisiana State University Press, 2010. ISBN 9780807136904, OCLC 695838872
- I watched you disappear, Baton Rouge, Louisiana : Louisiana State University Press, 2014. ISBN 9780807153048, OCLC 908740255
- From Nothing, Baton Rouge : Louisiana State University Press, 2016. ISBN 9780807163467, OCLC 940795255
- Second bloom : poems, Eugene, OR: Cascade Books, 2017. ISBN 9781532630071, OCLC 1001883912
