= Luis Miguel Enciso Recio =

Spanish historian and politician (1930–2018)

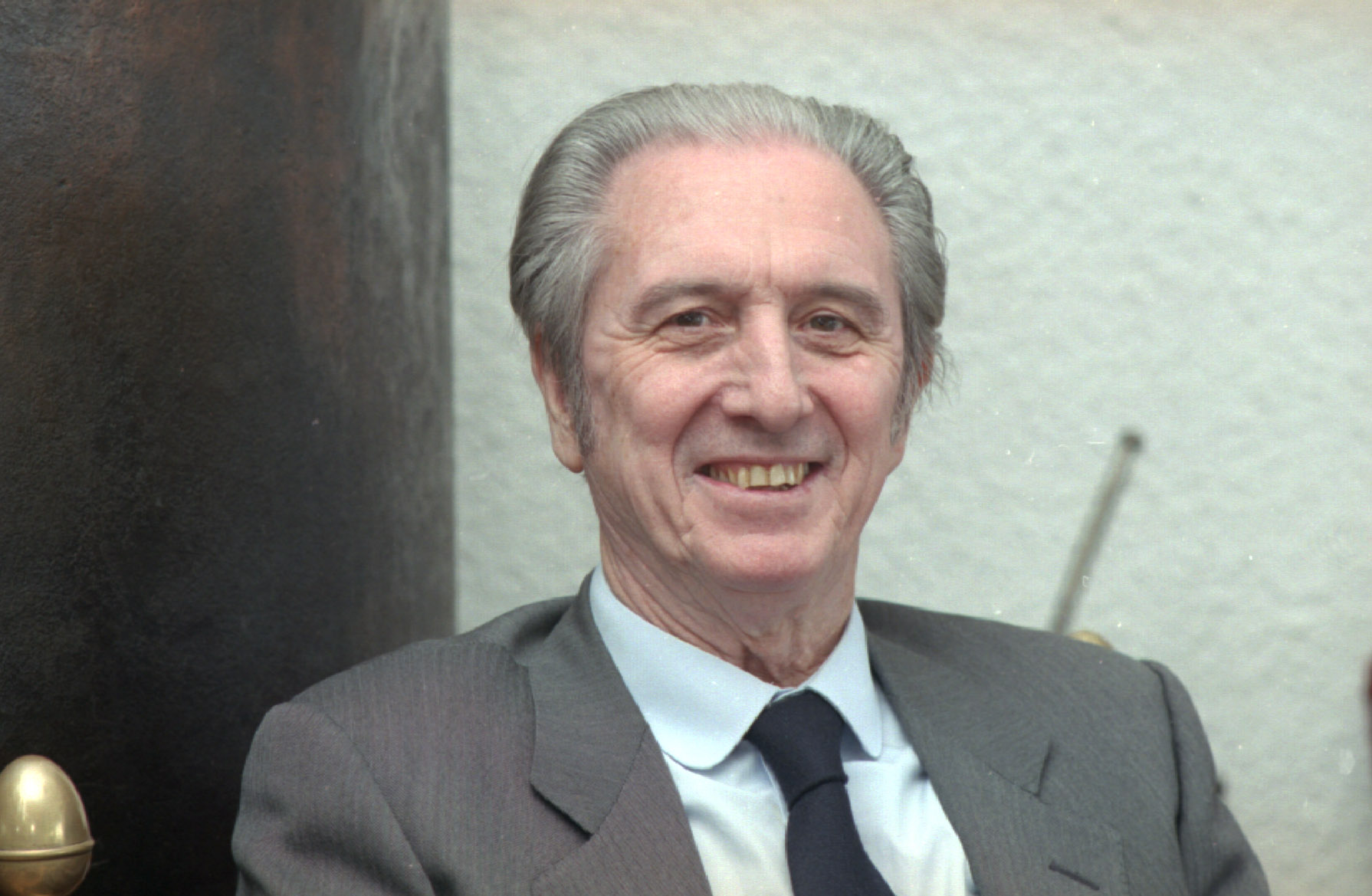

Luis Miguel Enciso Recio (8 April 1930 – 28 October 2018) was a Spanish historian and politician.

== Biography ==
Enciso was born on 8 April 1930 and earned a doctorate in history from the University of Valladolid in his hometown. Enciso began his academic career at his alma mater, then joined the faculty of the Complutense University of Madrid in 1980. He served on the Senate from 1977 to 1982, as a representative of the Union of the Democratic Centre. In 1999, Enciso was appointed to the Real Academia de la Historia.
