= Günther Haensch =

German linguist and lexicographer

Günther Haensch (April 22, 1923, Munich, Germany – May 10, 2018, Augsburg, Germany) was a German linguist and lexicographer. A specialist on Catalan and Aragonese dialectology, he has also published more general dictionaries and works on Spanish and French culture.

== Life ==
Günther Haensch was born in Munich. Between 1945 and 1951, he studied Romance languages and history at the University of Geneva, the University of Barcelona and the Ludwig-Maximilians-Universität München. From 1968 to 1973, he was Professor of Romance Languages and Cultural Studies at the Economics Faculty of the University of Erlangen–Nuremberg. From 1973 to 1992, he was Professor of Applied Linguistics (Romance Languages) at the University of Augsburg and director of its language center.
