= Mémoires: fils de la nation =

- Author: Jean-Marie Le Pen
- Language: French
- Release number: 50,000
- Subject: Autobiography
- Genre: non-fiction
- Publisher: Muller Editions
- Publication date: March 1, 2018
- Publication place: France
- Pages: 450
- ISBN: 979-10-90947-21-4 (Paperback)
- Website: jeanmarielepen.com

Mémoires: fils de la nation is a book by Jean-Marie Le Pen that was published in 2018. It details his life from his birth in 1928 to the foundation of the National Front in 1972. It sold 100,000 copies and was out of stock at Amazon on its first day of sales.

== Synopsis ==
Le Pen opens with an introduction about his ancestry and early life in Brittany, writing about his family and education. Le Pen defends the Vichy regime, hailing it as "legal and legitimate", and that Philippe Pétain was right to sign the Armistice of 22 June 1940. He went on to say that Charles de Gaulle fled France but Pétain stayed to face the situation. He also criticized him for leaving the "pseudo-resistants" to do what they called their "epuration" of Nazi collaborators after the liberation, and for vilifying Pétain to get power and honor.

== Writing ==
Jean-Marie Le Pen started taking notes for his autobiography in 1975 during a 2-month-long cruise across the Pacific Ocean, saying, "I will write my memories when I will be old." Le Pen started writing in 2015 with the help of Marie-Christine Arnautu. The original version was written on sheets of white paper with a blue marker. Le Pen would do nothing else except for writing his biography for several weeks. Le Pen has already started writing a sequel, scheduled to be released in Spring 2019.

== Release ==
Several publishing houses, notably éditions Robert Laffont, refused to publish the book and it was finally published by Muller Editions, owned since 2009 by Guillaume de Thieulloy, known for websites such as le Salon beige and Nouvelles de France. Hachette has now agreed to be the publisher of the book.

The first print of 50,000 copies was already sold three days before the release of the book including 10,000 online sales. The book was in first place of Amazon's sales in all categories two days before its release. A second print of 50,000 copies was launched the day before the book was released, and it ran out of stock at Amazon the next day.

== Reception ==
Saïd Macaraig, a political journalist specialising in the right-wing French politics, said that "it is impossible to miss such an important document. The text is well composed, at times lyrical and informative about certain historical periods". For him, this narrative, which breaks down in 1972, is "that of a nationalist in construction, torn between his desire to become a white father and the one to enjoy life. It is also a pamphlet against General de Gaulle, a recurring character in the narrative." He nevertheless judged the work inferior to the Mémoires de guerre of De Gaulle.

The Union of Young People for Progress, the official movement of the Gaullist youths, criticized the words of Le Pen about De Gaulle, especially the passages where Le Pen wrote that, "Charles de Gaulle remains a horrible source of suffering for France," or that he was, "a false great man whose destiny was to help France to become small". President of the Union, Ferréol Delmas, said, "the book that emerges from the old theory of 'sword and shield' is ultimately only a detail of the history of Littérature".
