= James W. Sire =

American Christian author, speaker, and editor (1933-2018)

James W. Sire (October 17 1933 – February 6, 2018) was an American Christian author, speaker, and editor for InterVarsity Press.

Born on a ranch on the rim of the Nebraska Sandhills, Sire was an officer in the Army, a college professor of English literature, philosophy and theology, the chief editor of InterVarsity Press (a Christian books publisher), a lecturer at over two hundred universities in the U.S., Canada, Eastern and Western Europe and Asia, and the author of twenty books on literature, philosophy and the Christian faith. His book The Universe Next Door, published in 1976 and as of 2020 in its sixth edition, has sold over 400,000 copies and has been translated into 20 foreign languages. He held a B.A. in chemistry and English from the University of Nebraska, an M.A. in English from Washington State College (now University) and a Ph.D. in English from the University of Missouri. His most recent publication was Rim of the Sandhills an eBook memoir of life on the ranch, in the military in Korea, at the university, in publishing and lecturing on three continents. It traces his early coming to faith and his gradual development of a mature apologetic for the Christian faith. He is known for introducing the works of Francis Schaeffer, Os Guinness, and others.

== Personal life and death ==
Sire and his wife, Marjorie, had four children, Carol, Gene, Richard, and Ann and eight grandchildren.

Sire died on February 6, 2018, at the age of 84.

== Books ==
His books included:

- Rim of the Sandhills (eBook on Kindle, 2012) ISBN 978-0-9858929-0-6 Memoir beginning with the author's growing up on a ranch in Nebraska and tracing his education, career as editor and international lecturer/apologist for the Christian faith.
- Deepest Differences (IVP 2009), with Carl Peraino. ISBN 978-0-8308-3358-0.
- The Universe Next Door ISBN 978-0-8308-2780-0. Over 400,000 in print as of 2020 in its sixth edition and translated into 20 languages.
- Scripture Twisting (IVP, 1980)
- Discipleship of the Mind, (IVP, 1990) "How do we love God with all our minds? A serious look at the academic enterprise from a Christian perspective. Very helpful and thought-provoking"
- Chris Chrisman Goes to College (IVP, 1993)
- Why Should Anyone Believe Anything at All? (IVP, 1994)
- Habits of the Mind: Intellectual Life as a Christian (IVP, 2001)
- Naming the Elephant: Worldview as a Concept (IVP, 2004)
- Learning to Pray Through the Psalms(IVP, 2005)
- Why Good Arguments Often Fail (IVP, 2006)
- Václav Havel (IVP, 2001)(a biography of the Czech Republic's former philosopher-president)
- Praying the Psalms of Jesus (IVP, 2007)
- A Little Primer on Humble Apologetics (IVP, 2006)
- How to Read Slowly: Reading for Comprehension (Wheaton Literary, 2000)
