= Luc Deflo =

Belgian writer (1958–2018)

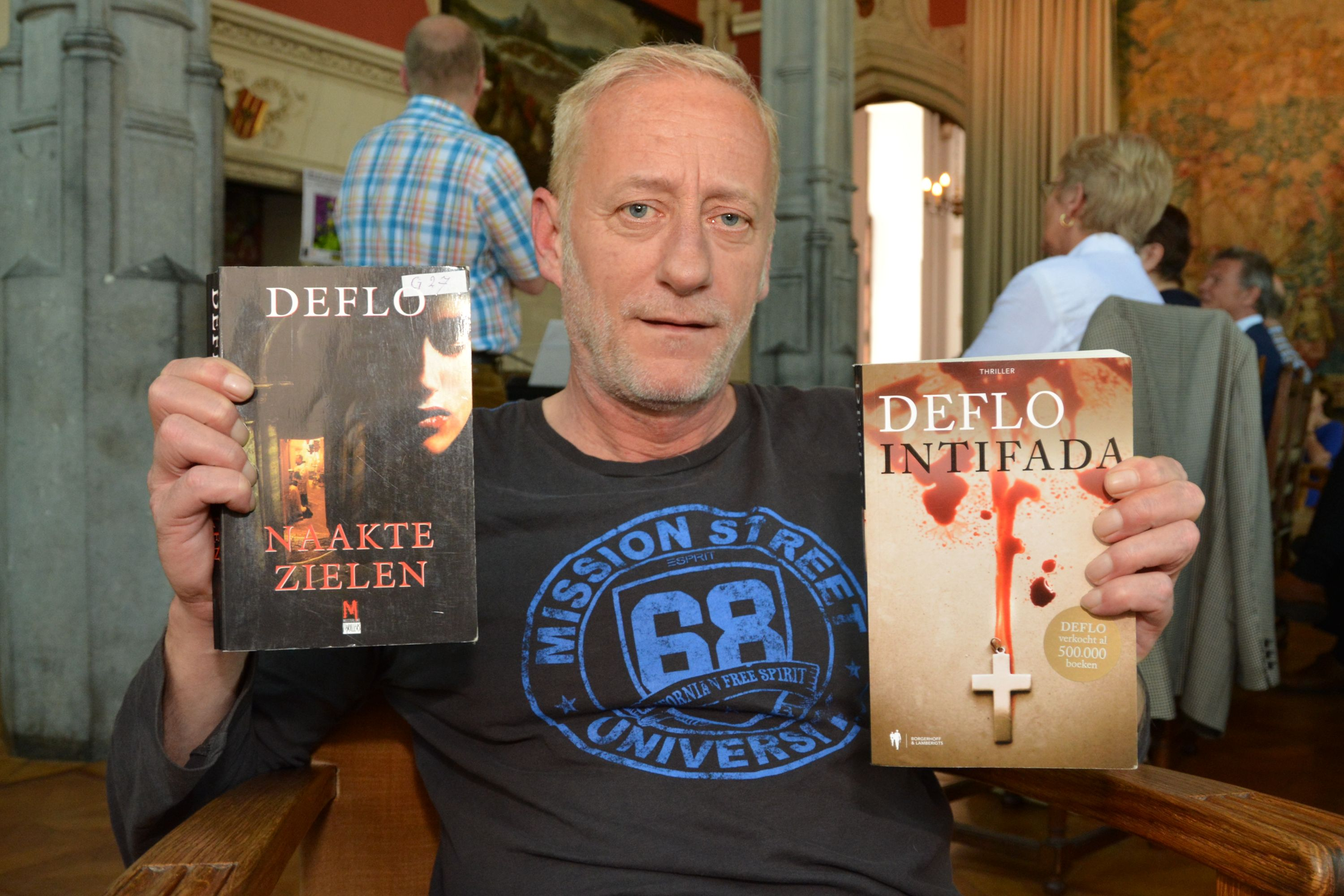
- Luc Deflo in 2014
- Born: 27 February 1958; Malines, Belgium
- Died: 26 November 2018 (aged 60)
- Occupation: Writer

Luc Deflo (27 February 1958 – 26 November 2018) was a Belgian writer.

== Biography ==
Luc Deflo began his career as a playwright, but upon reading a news article on an American serial killer, he became a novelist. In 1999, he published his first work, Naakte zielen.

After fifteen years with his publisher, WPG Uitgevers, his philosophy was no longer compatible with that of his old publisher, so he moved on to Borgerhoff & Lamberigts.

The studio MMG (Multimedia) plans on making movies out of his works Naakte zielen and Sluipend gif.

== Works ==
- Naakte zielen (1999)
- Bevroren hart (2000)
- Lokaas (2001)
- Kortsluiting (2002)
- Sluipend gif (2003)
- Onschuldig (2004)
- Copycat (2005)
- Weerloos (2005)
- Hoeren (2006)
- Ademloos (2006)
- Angst (2007)
- Spoorloos (2007)
- Pitbull (2008)
- Schimmen (2009)
- Lust (2009)
- Jaloezie (2010)
- Prooi (2010)
- Enigma (2011)
- Enigma (2012)
- Losers (2012)
- Genadeloos (2013)
- Giftige vlinders (2013)
- Intifada (2014)
- Onderhuids (2014)
- Macht (2014)
- Teek (2015)
