= Coşkun Büktel =

Turkish writer (1950–2018)

- Born: 18 December 1950; İzmir, Turkey
- Died: 6 November 2018 (aged 67)
- Occupations: Playwright, novelist, critic

Coşkun Büktel (18 December 1950 – 6 November 2018) was a Turkish playwright, screenwriter, novelist, theatre critic and translator.

He was born in İzmir, Turkey, in 1950 and graduated from the English Philology department of Istanbul University in 1981. He is best known for his twice-published play Theope, and also as a highly creative theatre critic.

Büktel also published a drama anthology named Eleştiren Oyunlar (The Criticizing Plays) and also translated D. H. Lawrence’s novella The Fox into Turkish. In his later years he wrote three screenplays, including Fiasco, the rights to which famous Turkish director/producer Sinan Çetin purchased, and İkinci Geliş (The Second Coming), which was turned into a novel and is to be published soon.

From 2007 onwards, Coşkun Büktel did uncredited work as a script doctor for one of the best rated TV serials Arka Sıradakiler, which reached its third season, and 88th episode, in October 2009.

== Published works ==
- Theope (1993, 2007)
- Shakespeare'siz Herifler (Guys with no Shakespeare) (1998)
- Türk Tiyatrosundan İnsan Manzaraları (Human Landscapes From Turkish Theater) (1998)
- Eleştiren Oyunlar (The Criticizing Plays) (1998)
- Tilki (The Fox) (1998)
- Yönetmen Tiyatrosuna Karşı (Against The Theater of Directors) (2001)
- Fiyasko (Fiasco) (2005). A funny crime novel, translated into English as Fiasco (Çitlembik Publication, 2008) by Feyza Howell.
