= Eleanor Winsor Leach =

American classical scholar

- Born: August 16, 1937; Providence, Rhode Island, U.S.
- Died: February 16, 2018 (aged 80); Bloomington, Indiana, U.S.
- Education: Bryn Mawr College; Yale University
- Occupation: Classical scholar
- Employer: Indiana University

Eleanor Winsor Leach (August 16, 1937 – February 16, 2018) was the Ruth N. Halls Professor with the Department of Classical Studies at Indiana University. She was a trustee of the Vergilian Society in 1978–83 and was second and then first vice-president in 1989–92. Leach was the president of the Society of Classical Studies (formerly, the American Philological Association) in 2005/6, and the chair of her department (1978–1985). She was very involved with academics and younger scholars – directing 26 dissertations, wrote letters for 200 tenure and promotion cases, and refereed more than 100 books and 200 articles. Leach's research interests included Roman painting, Roman sculpture, and Cicero and Pliny's Letters. She published three books (with another forthcoming) and more than 50 articles. Leach's work had an interdisciplinary focus, reading Latin texts against their social, political, and cultural context. From the 1980s onwards, she combined her work on ancient literature with the study of Roman painting, monuments, and topography.

== Education ==
Eleanor Winsor Leach was an undergraduate at Bryn Mawr College, where she took her A.B. magna cum laude with honors in Latin in 1959. She achieved her M.A. from Yale University in 1960. She achieved her Ph.D. in English and Latin from Yale University in 1963, with her dissertation focused on Ovid and Chaucer.

== Career ==
Eleanor Winsor Leach taught at Bryn Mawr (1962–66), Villanova University (1966–71), University of Texas at Austin (1972–74), Wesleyan University (1974–76), and Indiana University, Bloomington (1977–2018). When she joined the Department of Classical Studies at Indiana University, she was the only tenured woman. She was chair of the department between 1978 and 1985, and was the Director of Graduate Studies between 1997 and 2016.

Leach published three books – Vergil's Eclogues: Landscapes of Experience (Ithaca, 1974); The Rhetoric of Space: Literary and Artistic Representations of Landscape in Republican and Augustan Rome (Princeton, 1988); The Social Life of Painting in Ancient Rome and on the Bay of Naples (Cambridge, 2004) – with another forthcoming – Epistolary Dialogues: Constructions of Self and Others in the Letters of Cicero and the Younger Pliny (University of Michigan Press). Leach's work had an interdisciplinary focus, reading Latin texts against their social, political, and cultural context. From the 1980s onwards, she combined her work on ancient literature with the study of Roman painting, monuments, and topography.

Leach has won fellowships and awards (listed below) including ACLS, NEH, and Guggenheim fellowships. Leach was Vice-President for the Program Division of the Society for Classical Studies (1991–94) and later President of the Society for Classical Studies (2005/6). She was a trustee of the Vergilian Society (1978–93) and second and then first vice-president of it (1989–92). Leach was on the Classical Jury of the American Academy in Rome (1980–82), a Resident Scholar there (Fall 1983), and later conducted 3 NEH summer seminars there (1986, 1989, 2008). She was President of the central Indiana chapter of the Archaeological Institute of America (1985–87).

== Awards ==
- M. Carey Thomas Senior Essay Prize, Bryn Mawr College, 1959
- Woodrow Wilson Fellowship, 1959–60
- Yale University-Wilson Fellowships, 1959–62
- Carnegie Teaching Internship, C.C.N.Y, summer 1961
- U.S. Government Fulbright Award, 1962 (not accepted)
- Grant-in-Aid, American Philosophical Society, 1971
- Grant-in-Aid, ACLS, Summer 1972
- Fellow, Wesleyan University Center for the Humanities, Spring 1974
- Guggenheim Fellowship, 1976–77
- N.E.H. Senior Fellowship for Independent Study and Research, 1983–84
- Resident Scholar in Classical Studies, American Academy in Rome, Fall Semester 1983
- Director, N.E.H. Summer Seminars for College Teachers, American Academy in Rome, Summers 1986, 1989 and 2008.
- Blegen Distinguished Visiting Professor of Classics, Vassar College, 1987–88
- ACLS Senior Research Fellowship, 1992–93
- National Humanities Center Fellowship 1992–93
- Visiting Scholar, Wolfson College, Oxford University, 1996, Trinity Term
- Phi Beta Kappa, Hon. 1998
- John and Penelope Biggs Resident Scholar in Classics, Washington University in St. Louis, March 2000
- Freese Sr. Fellow, Center for Advanced Study in the Visual Arts, National Gallery of Art, Washington D.C. Spring Semester 2004
- Visiting Fellow, Magdalen College, Oxford University, 2010, Michaelmas Term
- Elected Honorary Member SCR 2011–2017

== Publications ==
=== Books ===
- Vergil's Eclogues: Landscapes of Experience. Ithaca, New York. 1974.
- The Rhetoric of Space: Literary and Artistic Representations of Landscape in Republican and Augustan Rome. Princeton. 1988.
- The Social Life of Painting in Ancient Rome and on the Bay of Naples. Cambridge University Press. June 2004; September 2011.
- Epistolary Dialogues: Constructions of Self and Others in the Letters of Cicero and the Younger Pliny. University of Michigan Press. Forthcoming.

=== Articles ===
- 'Georgic Imagery in the Ars Amatoria'. TAPA 95 (1964): 142–154.
- 'Propertius 1.17: The Experimental Voyage'. YCS 19 (1966): 211–232.
- 'Nature and Art in Vergil's Second Eclogue'. AJP 87 (1966): 427–445.
- 'The Unity of Eclogue 6'. Latomus 27 (1968): 12–32.
- 'Meam quom formam noscito: Language and Characterization in the Menaechmi'. Arethusa 2 (1969): 30–45.
- 'De exemplo meo ipse aedificato: An Organizing Idea in the Mostellaria'. Hermes 97 (1969): 318–332.
- 'The Blindness of Mezentius (Aeneid 10.762–768)'. Arethusa 4 (1971): 83–90.
- 'Eclogue 4: Symbolism and Sources'. Arethusa 4 (1971): 167–184.
- 'Horace's Pater Optimus and Terence's Demea: Autobiographical Fiction and Comedy in Sermo 1.4'. AJP 92 (1971): 616–632.
- 'Corydon Revisited: An Interpretation of the Political Eclogues of Calpurnius Siculus'. Ramus 2 (1973): 53–97.
- 'Plautus' Rudens: Venus Born from a Shell'. Texas Studies in Language and Literature 15 (1974): 915–932.
- 'Ekphrasis and the Theme of Artistic Failure in Ovid's Metamorphoses'. Ramus 3 (1974): 102–142.
- 'Ergasilus and the Ironies of the Captivi'. Classica et Mediaevalia 30 (1969): 263–296.
- 'Neronian Pastoral and the World of Power'. Ramus 4 (1975): 204–233.
- 'Sedes Apibus: From the Georgics to the Aeneid'. Vergilius 22 (1977): 2–16.
- 'Parthenian Caverns: Remapping of an Imaginative Topography'. Journal of the History of Ideas 39 (1978): 539–560.
- 'Vergil, Horace, Tibullus: Three Collections of Ten'. Ramus 7 (1978): 79–106.
- 'Poetics and Poetic Design in Tibullus' First Elegiac Book'. Arethusa 13 (1980): 79–96.
- 'Sacral-Idyllic Landscape Painting and the Poems of Tibullus' First Book'. Latomus 39 (1980): 47–69.
- 'The Soldier and Society: Plautus' Miles Gloriosus as Popular Drama'. Rivista di Studi Classici 27 (1979): 185–209.
- 'Georgics 2 and the Poem'. Arethusa 14 (1981): 35–48.
- 'The Metamorphoses of the Myth of Acteon in Campanian Painting'. Mitteilungen des Deutschen Archaeologischen Instituts, Roemische Abteilung 88 (1981): 171–183 and pls. 131–141.
- 'The Anonymity of Romano-Campanian Painting and the Transition from the Second to the Third Style'. In B. Gold (ed.), Literary and Artistic Patronage in Augustan Rome (Austin, Texas, 1982): 135–173.
- '"Morwe of May": A Season of Feminine Ambiguity'. In Carruthers and Kirk (ed.), Acts of Interpretation: The Text in its Context 700–1600: Essays on Medieval and Renaissance Literature in Honor of E. Talbot Donaldson (Norman, Oklahoma, 1982): 299–310.
- 'Illustration as Interpretation in Brant's and Dryden's Editions of Vergil'. In S. Hindman (ed.), The Early Illustrated Book: Essays in Honor of Lessing J. Rosenwald (Washington, Library of Congress, 1982): 175–210.
- 'Transformations in the Georgics: Vergil's Italy and Varro's'. Atti del Convegno scientifico mondiale di studi su Virgilio, Accademia Nazionale Virgiliana, ed., 2 Vols. (Milan, 1984) Vol. I: 85–108.
- 'The Punishment of Dirce: A Newly Discovered Continuous Narrative Painting in the Casa di Giulio Polibio and its Significance within the Visual Tradition'. Roemische Mitteilungen 93 (1986): 118–138 & color pl. 1; pls 49–59.
- 'Landscape and the Prosperous Life: The Discrimination of Genre in Augustan Literature and Painting'. Archeologica Transatlantica: 5 (1985): 189–196.
- 'The Implied Reader and the Political Argument of Seneca's Apocolocyntosis and De Clementia'. Arethusa 22 (1989): 197–230.
- 'The Politics of Self-Presentation: Pliny's Letters and Roman Portrait Sculpture'. Classical Antiquity 9 (1990): 19–39.
- 'The Iconography of the Black Salone in the Casa di Fabio Rufo at Pompeii'. Kölner Jahrbuch fur Vor-und Früh geschichte 24 (1991): 105–112.
- 'Polyphemus in a Landscape: Traditions of Pastoral Courtship'. In John Dixon Hunt (ed.), The Pastoral Landscape, National Gallery of Art, Studies in the History of Art 36 (1992): 63–88.
- 'Horace's Sabine Property in Lyric and Hexameter Verse'. AJP 114 (1993): 271–302.
- 'Absence and Desire in Cicero's De Amicitia'. Classical World 87 (1993): 3–20.
- 'The Entrance Room in the House of Julius Polibius and the Nature of the Roman Vestibulum'. In E.M. Moorman (ed.), Proceedings of the Fifth International Congress on Ancient Wall Painting, Amsterdam, 8–12 September 1992. Publications of the Dutch Institute in Rome, Stichtung Babesch (Leiden, 1993): 23–28.
- 'Horace Odes 1.8: Achilles, the Campus Martius and the Articulation of Gender in Augustan Rome'. Classical Philology 89 (1994): 334–343.
- 'Roman Painting' s.v. In B. M. Fagan (ed.), Oxford Companion to Archaeology (New York/Oxford, 1996): 603–605.
- 'Cicero Decorates a Gymnasium'. Omnibus, 1997: 13–16.
- 'Oecus on Ibycus: Investigating the Vocabulary of the Roman House'. In Rick Jones and Sarah Bon (ed.), Space and Sequence in Ancient Pompeii (Oxbow Books, Oxford, 1997): 50–71.
- 'Venus, Thetis and the Social Construction of Maternal Behavior'. Classical Journal 92 (1997): 347–371.
- 'Horace and the Material Culture of Augustan Rome: A Revisionary Reading'. In T. Habinek and A. Schiesaro (ed.), The Roman Cultural Revolution (Cambridge University Press, November 1997): 105–121.
- 'Personal and Communal Memory in the Reading of Horace's Odes Books I-III'. Arethusa 31 (1998): 43–74.
- 'Satyrs and Spectators: Reflections of Theatrical Settings in Third Style Mythological Continuous Narrative Painting.' In D. Scagliarini Corlàita (ed.), I temi figurativi nella pittura parietale antica (IV sec. a.C. – IV sec. d.C.). Atti del Vi Convegna Internazionale sulla Pittura Parietale Antica (Bologna, 1998): 81–85; 335–336.
- 'Viewing the spectacula of Aeneid 6'. In Christine Perkell (ed.), Reading Vergil's Aeneid (University of Oklahoma Press, 1999): 111–127.
- Contribution to Household Archaeology, P. M. Allison (ed.) Routledge, April 1999.
- 'Ciceronian "Bi-Marcus": Correspondence with M. Terentius Varro and L. Papirius Paetus in 46 B.C.' TAPA 1999: 139–180.
- 'Cicero's Pro Sestio: Spectacle and Performance'. In J. Hallett and S. Dickison (ed.), Rome and her Monuments: Essays on the City and Literature of Rome in Honor of Katherine A Geffcken (Illinois. 2000): 369–397.
- 'G.P. Bellori and the Sepolcro dei Nasonii: Writing a Poet's Tomb'. In Alix Barbet (ed.), La peinture funéraire antique IV siècle av. J.-C. – IV siècle apr. J.-C. (Paris. 2001): 69–77.
- 'Gendering Clodius'. Classical World 94 (2001): 335–359.
- 'Narrative Space and the Viewer in Philostratus' Eikones'. Mitteilungen des Deutschen Archaeologischen Instituts Römische Abteilung 107 (2000): 237–252.
- 'Otium as Luxuria in the Status Economy of Pliny's Letters'. In Roy Gibson and Ruth Morello (ed.), Re-Imagining Pliny the Younger. Arethusa 36 (2003): 147–166.
- 'Doctus spectare lacunar: Roman Ceilings in Verbal Contexts'. In László Borhy (ed.), Plafonds e voûtes à l’époque antique (Budapest, 2004): 55–60.
- 'Constructing Identity: Q. Haterius and C Trimalchio Decorate their Tombs'. In E.V. D’Ambra and Guy Metraux (ed,), The Art of Citizens, Soldiers and Freedmen in the Roman World (Archeo Press, 2006): 1–18.
- 'An gravius aliquid scribam: Roman Seniores write to Iuniores'. TAPA 137 (2006): 247–267.
- 'Claudia Quinta (pro Caelio 34) and an Altar to Magna Mater'. Dictynna 4 (2007). 1–14.
- 'Hypermestra's Querela: Coopting the Danaids in Horace Odes 3.11 and in Augustan Rome'. Classical World 102 (2008): 13–32.
- 'The Implied Reader and the Political Argument in Seneca's Apocolocyntosis AND De Clementia'. Article published in 1989 Arethusa, republished with revisions and added bibliography in John Fitch (ed.), Oxford Readings in Seneca (Oxford, 2008): 264–298.
- 'Harry Berger's Sprezzatura and the Rhetorical Poses of Cicero's de Oratore'. In D. Miller and N. Levene (ed.), A Touch More Rare: Harry Berger’s Art of Interpretation (Fordham, 2009): 182–196.
- 'Litora picta...nativis lapillis: Campanian mosaic fountains and their contexts'. In Irene Bragantini (ed.), Proceedings of the 11th Congress of the Association Internationale pour l’Etude de la Peinture Antique (Naples, University Press 2010): 65–76.
- 'Fortune's Extremities: Q Lutatius Catulus and Largo Argentina Temple B: A Roman Consular and his Monument'. Memoirs of the American Academy in Rome 55 (2010): 111–134.
- 'Rhetorical Inventio and the Expectations of Roman Continuous Narrative Painting'. In D. Balch and A. Weissenreider (ed.), Contested Space (Mohr-Siebeck, Tübingen 2011): 109–127.
- 'Rome's Elegiac Topography: the View form the Via Sacra'. In B. Gold (ed.), Blackwells Companion to Roman Elegiac Poetry (Wiley-Blackwell Press, 2012): 134–152.
- 'Pliny's Diffident Suetonius: A Portrait in Six Epistles'. New England Classical Journal 2012: 87–98.
- 'Response Essay: What has Pliny to Say'. In Ramsby and Bell (eds.), Free at Last: The Impact of Freed Slaves on the Roman Empire (Bristol, UK, 2012): 196–210.
- 'M. Atilius Regulus: Turning Defeat into Victory: Diverse Values in an Ambivalent Story'. In C Pieper and J. Ker (ed.), Valuing the Past in the Greco-Roman World (Leiden 2014): 243–268.
