= Truck Full of Ducks =

2018 American children's picture book by Ross Burach

- Author: Ross Burach
- Illustrator: Burach
- Language: English
- Genre: Children's picture book
- Published: 2018 (Scholastic Press)
- Publication place: United States of America
- Media type: Print (hardback, paperback)
- Pages: 35 (unpaginated)
- ISBN: 9781338129366
- OCLC: 1023864913

Truck Full of Ducks is a 2018 American children's picture book written and illustrated by Ross Burach about a duck delivery service.

== Reception ==
A review in School Library Journal of Truck Full of Ducks wrote "Children will delight in the extreme silliness of this story and will repeatedly pore over the detailed, colorful, and quirky illustrations.".

Truck Full of Ducks has also been reviewed by Kirkus Reviews, Publishers Weekly, and Booklist.
