= Paul Harris (author) =

Paul Anthony Harris (22 July 1948 – 24 May 2018) was an author and publisher, based in Scotland. His first work was When Pirates Ruled the Waves, which ran to four editions within a short space of time between 1968 and 1970. This was published by his own company, Impulse Books in Aberdeen.

His second book, To be a Pirate King, extended the story into 1971 and caused a sensation in the Netherlands, where it was published by De Telegraaf. It led directly to him working for the British intelligence service, MI6, and a long time involvement in analysis of Libya and, later, the Lockerbie disaster.

Following these, he branched out in the topics covered, including the oil industry, murder, and Scottish Art. As of 2012, he was the author of 42 published books.

A third offshore radio book appeared consolidating and updating the previous books, entitled Broadcasting from the High Seas.

He was a founder member of the Scottish General Publishers' Association. The first meeting of what was to become what is now Publishing Scotland, took place in a late afternoon in 1973 in the offices of Canongate in Jeffrey Street.

He had an Honours degree in Politics and International Relations (Aberdeen University 1970). After fifteen years in publishing, he became a publishing consultant. As a result, he found himself trapped in Yugoslavia as war broke out there on 26 June 1991. His Airbus was bombed in the attack on Ljubljana airport and he then stayed on to report from the front line; from children's hospitals; from refugee columns under fire; and, even, from the mortuaries in Christmas week. This also resulted in his book Somebody Else's War, published in 1992.

He stayed on and became a journalist, covering eighteen wars between 1991 and 2001. He worked for the London Daily Telegraph as Colombo correspondent 2000–01 and was columnist for the Daily Mirror there, during which he released 'Fractured Paradise', a photographic analysis of the Sri Lankan conflict found critical of the terrorist group Tamil Tigers. He was expelled as a danger to Sri Lanka's national security in November 2001, at the behest of the Tamil Tigers. He was an editor on the Shanghai Daily from January 2002.

The publishers Kennedy & Boyd (Glasgow) brought out an updated version of When Pirates Ruled the Waves in 2007, the fortieth anniversary of the Marine Broadcasting Offences Act 1967. In 2009, his autobiography More Thrills than Skills: adventures in journalism, war and terrorism was published by Kennedy & Boyd

After settling in Coldingham, Berwickshire, he established a gallery and auction house for Chinese art. He died on 24 May 2018, leaving behind his wife Sulee and daughter Lucy.

== Sources ==
- Testimonial from the 30th Anniversary of SPA
