= Salawat Gallyamov =

Bashkir linguist and researcher

Salawat Gallyamov Салава́т Галля́мов

Personal details
- Born: Salawat Abdrakhmanovich Gallyamov; 24 December 1959 Ufa, Russian SFSR, Soviet Union
- Died: 5 September 2018 (aged 58) Ufa, Bashkortostan, Russia
- Profession: Linguist

Salawat Abdrakhmanovich Gallyamov (December 24, 1959 – September 5, 2018) was a Bashkir linguist, researcher, supporter of the theory of the Turanian origin of the Bashkir people. Gallyamov is known for his research in the field of the epics and myths of the peoples of Eurasia and the connections and linguistic parallels of the Bashkir language with ancient and modern languages.

== Books ==
- Эпосу «Урал-батыр» — 4 тысячи лет Уфа, ж-л «Шонкар», 1996
- Великий Хау Бен. Уфа, Госкомнауки РБ, 1997
- Башкорды от Гильгамеша до Заратуштры. Уфа, РИО РУМНЦ РБ, ISBN 5-295-03513-1 : 1000, 1998
- Введение в сопоставительное изучение грамматики башкордского, кордского и английского языков. Уфа, РИО РУМНЦ РБ, 1999
- Кордско-Башкордско-Англо-Русский словарь. Уфа, РИО РУМНЦ РБ, 2000
- Основы Башкордской Индо-Германской философии, 2001–2003. В 4-х томах: Онтология, Гносеология.
- Башкордский язык и санскрит. М., СПб, 2003. 308 с.
- Башкордская философия. В 4 томах. Уфа: Китап, 2005. ISBN 5-295-03698-7
- Древние арии и вечный Курдистан. (Серия «Тайны древних цивилизаций») - М.: Вече. 2007 г., Твердый переплет, 555 стр. ISBN 978-5-9533-1407-7 Тираж: 3000 экз.
