= Edward W. Tayler =

American literary scholar (1931–2018)

Edward William Tayler (March 13, 1931 – April 23, 2018) was an American literary scholar.

He was born in Berlin on March 13, 1931, and moved to the United States, where he grew up in Westfield, New Jersey. He received a bachelor's degree from Amherst College and earned a doctorate in English from Stanford University. Tayler joined the faculty of Columbia University in 1960, and was named the Lionel Trilling Professor in the Humanities. He was awarded a Guggenheim fellowship in 1968. Tayler retired in 1999, although he returned briefly to teach Literature Humanities and a graduate section in the mid 2000s when he was in fair health. He died of heart failure on April 23, 2018, aged 87.
