= Eduard Frolov =

Russian historian

Eduard Davidovich Frolov
- Born: 1 March 1933; Leningrad, Soviet Union (now Saint Petersburg)
- Died: 19 August 2018 (aged 85); Saint Petersburg, Russia
- Education: Saint Petersburg State University
- Awards: Honored Scientist of the Russian Federation (1998); Honorary Worker of Higher Professional Education of the Russian Federation (2004)
- Scientific career
- Fields: History of Ancient Greece
- Workplaces: Saint Petersburg State University

Eduard Davidovich Frolov (Russian: Эдуард Давидович Фролов; 1 March 1933 – death published on 19 August 2018) was a Russian historian, Doctor of Sciences (Dsc), Honorary Professor at the Saint Petersburg State University since 2010, and Director of the Center for Classics Studies at the same University since 1994, Honored Scientist of the Russian Federation (1998). He was also Honoured Worker of Higher Professional Education of the Russian Federation (2004).

Frolov graduated from the Saint Petersburg State University in 1955. In 1958 he defended his Candidate's Dissertation. In 1972, he defended his doctoral dissertation. In 1974 he received the title of Professor.

From 1971 to 2015, Frolov headed the Department of History of Ancient Greece and Rome at the Saint Petersburg State University.

Frolov was a member of the Editorial Board for Journal of Ancient History.

Professor Frolov is the author more than 300 scientific works, including 15 monographs.
