= Pierre Coustillas =

French literary scholar and professor (1930–2018)

Pierre Coustillas (11 July 1930 – 11 August 2018) was a French literary scholar and emeritus professor of English at the University of Lille. He was a specialist in the work of George Gissing.

== Selected publications ==
- Gissing's writings on Dickens : a bio-bibliographical survey. Enitharmon Press, London, 1971.
- The rediscovery of George Gissing. London, 1971. (With John Spiers)
- London and the life of literature in late Victorian England: The diary of George Gissing, novelist. Harvester Press, 1978. ISBN 0855277491
- George Gissing: the definitive bibliography. Rivendale Press, High Wycomb, England, 2005. ISBN 1904201024
- The heroic life of George Gissing. Pickering & Chatto, London, 2011-2012. (3 volumes)
- George Gissing: The critical heritage. Routledge, London, 2013. (Joint editor with Colin Partridge) ISBN 9780415869638
