= Barbara Nawrocka-Dońska =

Polish journalist (1924–2018)

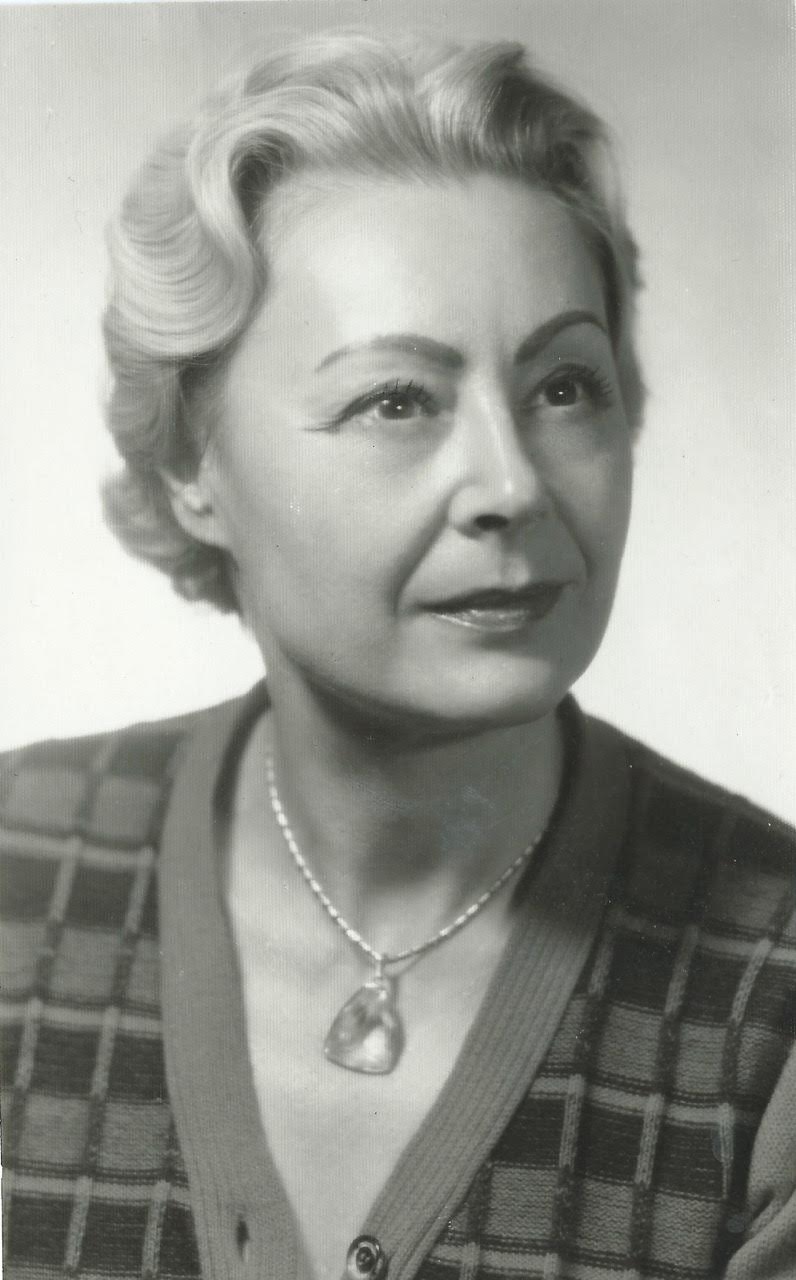
Nawrocka-Dońska in 1975

Barbara Nawrocka-Dońska (17 October 1924 – 15 May 2018) was a Polish prose writer, essayist and journalist. She was born in Warsaw.

== World War II years ==
During World War II, Nawrocka-Dońska was a soldier of the Home Army and took part in the Warsaw Uprising.

She was elevated, by decision of the President of the Republic of Poland, Lech Wałęsa, to second lieutenant of the Polish Army. By order of the Minister of National Defense, Jerzy Szmajdziński, she was promoted to lieutenant.

== Career ==
Nawrocka-Dońska graduated from the Faculty of Law at the University of Warsaw.

Nawrocka-Dońska was the author of over 500 articles in the daily and field press, Warsaw cultural weeklies, including reports, critical-literary articles, film critics and the culture section in Trybuna Ludu; reports from over a dozen stays in the Soviet Union, from China, France, Switzerland, Italy, Greece and Cuba. She also wrote in the women's press, including Zwierciadło.

She was a member of the following:

- Association of Polish Writers, 1958-1990
- The Main Board, the chairwoman of the ZLP Cooperation Commission with the Book House, then until 1990 she was chairwoman of the Loan Fund Committee
- Association of Authors ZAiKS, since 1959
- Association of Journalists of the Republic of Poland, 1982
- International Publicity Club
- Union of Warsaw Insurgent, 1990
- Association of Polish Writers, February 2000
- Association of European Culture, March 2000

Nawrocka-Dońska published 28 books, including 5 book editions of foreign reports.

== Personal life ==
Her husband was journalist Ryszard Doński (1923-1973). They had a daughter, Małgorzata Dońska-Olszko, an educator, and a son, Jacek Nawrocki, who died in 2002.

Barbara Nawrocka-Dońska died on 15 May 2018 in Warsaw at the age of 93.
