= Diana Der Hovanessian =

Armenian American poet, translator, and author

- Born: May 21, 1934; Worcester, Massachusetts
- Died: March 1, 2018 (aged 83)
- Education: Boston University, Harvard University
- Occupation: Professor
- Writing career
- Genre: Poetry

Signature
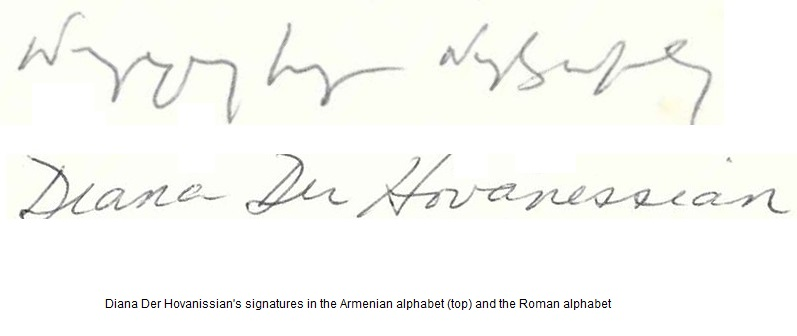

Diana Der Hovanessian (May 21, 1934 – March 1, 2018) was an Armenian American poet, translator, and author. Much of the subject of her poetry was about Armenia and the Armenian diaspora. She wrote and published over twenty-five books.

== Life and career ==
Diana Der Hovanessian was born in Worcester, Massachusetts, to an Armenian family. Her mother Mariam Israelian was born in Worcester, Massachusetts, whereas, her father – John Der Hovanessian's parents were from Tadem Kharpert, Western Armenia. She received her education at Boston University, majoring in English, and then continued her education at Harvard University, studying under Robert Lowell. She became an American literature professor at Yerevan State University, and twice a Fulbright Professor of Armenian Poetry. She led many workshops including Boston University, Bard College, and Columbia University, as well as being a visiting poet and lecturer on American poetry, Armenian poetry in translation. and the literature of human rights in the United States and abroad. For over thirty years she served as the president of the New England Poetry Club, and was on the translation board of Columbia University. She worked as a poet in the Massachusetts schools.

Three volumes of her poetry were translated into Armenian and published in Yerevan. Her works were also translated into Greek, French and Romanian. Der Hovanessian's poems have appeared in The New York Times, The Christian Science Monitor, The Boston Globe, Paris Review, the Writer's Almanac, AGNI, The American Poetry Review, and The Nation, among many others.

== Awards ==
Diana Der Hovanessian's awards include:

- Gold Medal from the Minister of Culture of Armenia
- Mesrob Mashtots Translation Award (2003)
- Armenian National Library Medal
- Armenian Writers Union Award
- The PEN-New England GOLDEN PEN Award
- The National Writers Union Award
- National Endowment for the Arts award (1993)
- St. Sahag Medal
- Paterson Prize
- International Poetry Forum publication prize
- QRL Colladay publication prize
- Awards from American Scholar and Prairie Schooner
- PEN/Columbia Translation Award
- Anahid Award from the Columbia University Armenian Center
- The Barcelona Peace Prize
- Armand Erpf translation prize
- Boston University Distinguished Alumni Award
- Mary Caroline Davies Poetry Society of America Lyric Poem Award
- New England Poetry Club Gretchen Warren Award
- Numerous prizes from the World Order of Narrative Poets

Her poetry has been translated into Armenian, Greek, French and Romanian.

== Partial bibliography ==
- How to choose your past (1978)
- Hovanessian, Diana Der; Margossian, Marzbed, eds. (1978). Anthology of Armenian Poetry. Translated by Hovanessian, Diana Der; Margossian, Marzbed. New York: Columbia University Press. ISBN 978-0-231-04565-0.
- Come sit beside me and listen to Kouchag: Medieval Poems of Nahabed Kouchag (1984)
- About time: poems (1987)
- Songs of bread, songs of salt (1990)
- Selected Poems (1994)
- The Circle Dancers (1996)
- Any Day Now : poems (1999)
- The Burning Glass : poems (2002)
- The Other Voice: Armenian Women's Poetry Through the Ages (2005)
- The Second Question : poems (2007)
- Dancing at the monastery : poems (2011)
