= Philippe de Baleine =

French author (1921–2018)

- Born: 27 September 1921
- Died: 7 June 2018 (aged 96)
- Occupation: Author

Philippe de Baleine (27 September 1921 – 7 June 2018), also known as Philippe de Jonas, was a French author. He is the recipient of two literary prizes from the Académie française: the Prix J.-J. Weiss for Hôtel des Piranhas in 1984, and the Prix de Littérature générale for Voyage espiègle et romanesque sur le petit train du Congo in 1992. He died in June 2018 at the age of 96.
