= 2018 in France =

- Decades: 1990s; 2000s; 2010s; 2020s; 2030s
- See also: History of France; Timeline of French history; List of years in France

This article lists major events that happened in 2018 in France.

== Incumbents ==
- President – Emmanuel Macron (REM)
- Prime Minister – Édouard Philippe (LR)

== Events ==
=== January ===
- 1 January – Corsica becomes a single territorial collectivity
- 4 January – Vésuve de Brekka arrives in China as a diplomatic gift to Xi Jinping from President Macron.
- 17 January – The government decides to abandon the Grand Ouest airport project in Notre-Dame-des-Landes
- 19 January – Beginning of the demonstrations in Mayotte
- 22 January – Wolfgang Schäuble, President of the Bundestag, addresses the National Assembly to celebrate the 55th anniversary of the Élysée Treaty.
- 24 January – Water rising in Paris causes a Seine flood alert.
- 28 January – Val-d'Oise's 1st constituency and Territoire de Belfort's 1st constituency by-elections, 2018.
- 28 January – Beginning of the Daval affair, French criminal case concerning the murder of Alexia Daval, whose body was found on October 30, 2017

=== February ===
- 20 February – Beginning of the "Operation Dead Island ", a general strike lasting several weeks in Mayotte against insecurity and uncontrolled Comorian immigration
- 23 February – 35 mayors in the Nièvre department resign to protest against the closure of the Clamecy hospital emergency room at night.

=== March ===
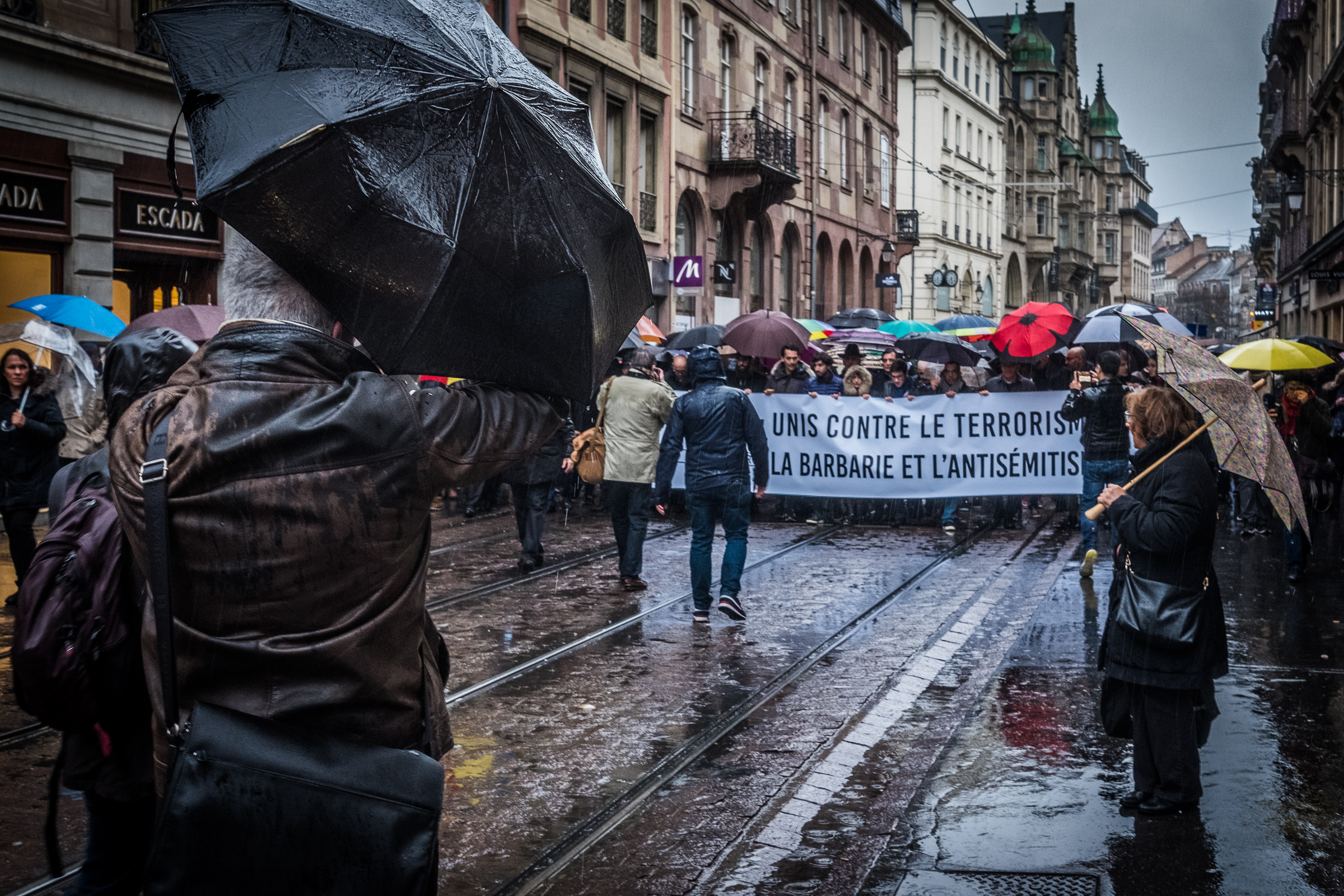
White March in memory of Mireille Knoll

- 2 March –
  - 43rd César Awards.
  - The Embassy of France in Burkina Faso is targeted during the 2018 Ouagadougou attacks.
- 4 March – 2018 French Guiana's 2nd constituency by-election.
- 11 March – 2018 Haute-Garonne's 8th constituency by-election.
- 18 March – Loiret's 4th constituency and Mayotte's 1st constituency by-elections, 2018.
- 23 March –
  - Carcassonne and Trèbes attack.
  - Murder of Mireille Knoll.
- 28 March –
  - National homage to the lieutenant-colonel (promoted colonel on March 27) Arnaud Beltrame
  - White March in memory of Mireille Knoll

=== April ===
- 3 April – Beginning of a period of intermittent strikes at the French National Railway Company until the end of June to protest against the scheduled end of the railway workers' status
- 8 April – 2018 French residents overseas' 5th constituency by-election.
- 15 April – 2018 Wallis and Futuna's 1st constituency by-election.
- 24 April – Tropical Cyclone Fakir touch Reunion.

=== May ===
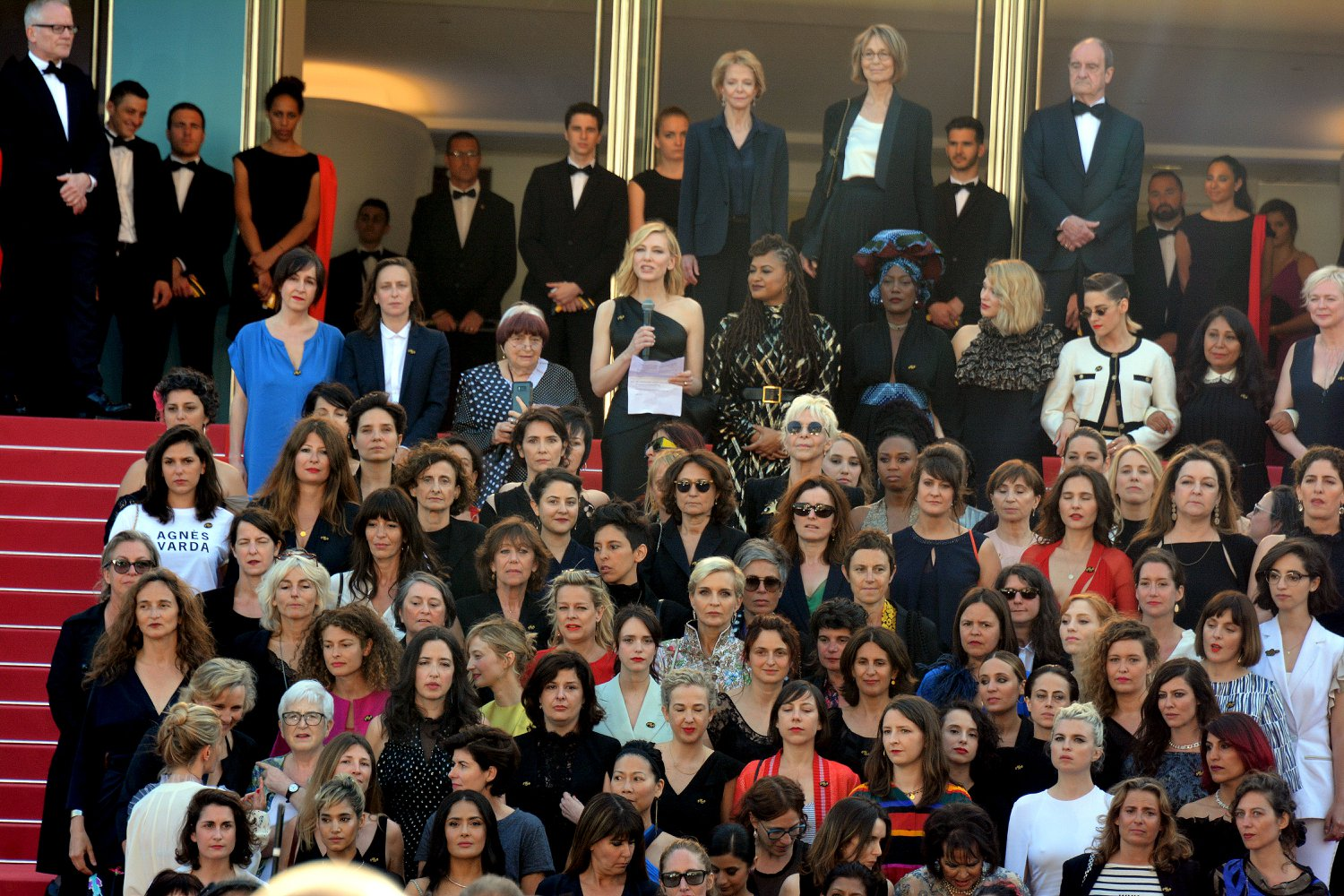
Démonstration by female filmmakers demanding equality between men and women in the film industry, during 2018 Cannes Film Festival

- 8 May – Beginning of the 2018 Cannes Film Festival.
- 12 May – 2018 Paris knife attack.
- 27 May – Beginning of the 2018 French Open.

=== June ===
- 24 June – Dismantling of the right-wing extremist terrorist group "Action of the operational forces" (AFO) by the arrest of its 9 members – including its chief – and arrest of the leader of self-proclaimed group "Volontaires pour la France"; seizure of about twenty firearms and dismantling of a clandestine laboratory of homemade explosives. The AFO had planned to carry out attacks in France against Muslims.

=== July ===
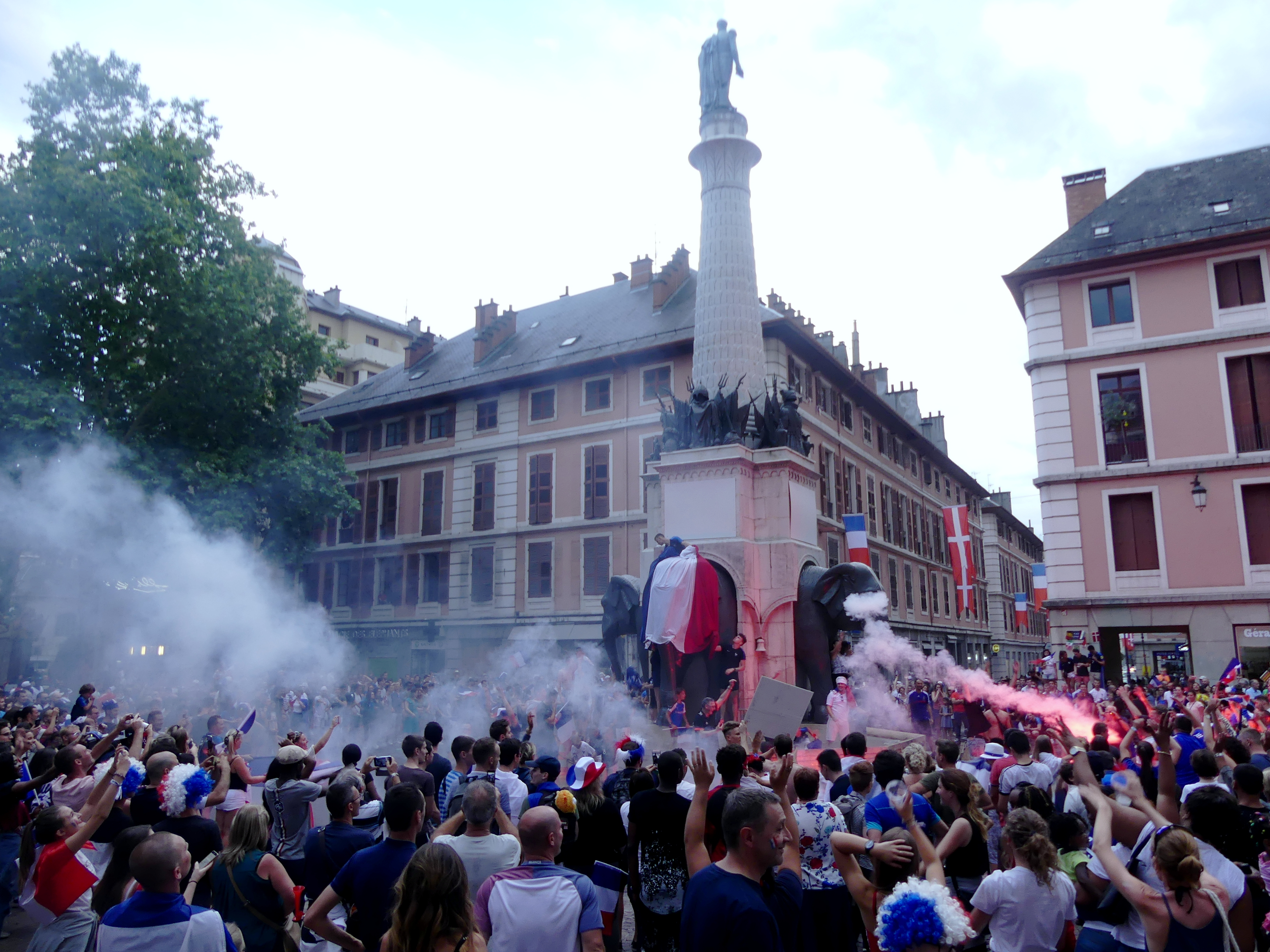
Sight of people to celebrate France's victory at the 2018 football World Cup, in Chambéry

- 1 July – Simone Veil and Antoine Veil, her husband, were buried in the Panthéon
- 7 July – First race of the 2018 Tour de France.
- 15 July – France wins the 2018 FIFA World Cup.
- 18 July – Revelations by Le Monde mark the beginning of the Benalla affair.
- 30 July – A racist shooting wounds 7 people in Beaune, the two suspected shooters are arrested in Saint-Andiol on August 10.

=== August ===
- 1 August – Lawmakers vote to outlaw catcalling.
- 28 August – Nicolas Hulot resigns as Minister of Ecological and Inclusive Transition to protest against the government's ecological policy.

=== September ===
- 4 September –
  - Laura Flessel-Colovic resigns as Minister of Sports for personal reasons.
  - Philippe government reshuffle : François de Rugy becomes Minister of State, Minister of Ecological and Inclusive Transition, replacing Nicolas Hulot, and Roxana Maracineanu replaces Laura Flessel at the Ministry of Sports.
- 12 September – Richard Ferrand is elected President of the National Assembly.
- 16 September – Frédérique Dumas, member of the French National Assembly for Hauts-de-Seine's 13th constituency, leaves both the party La République En Marche! and the La République En Marche group at the French National Assembly.
- 23 September – Réunion's 7th constituency by-elections, 2018 following political differences (notably on the lack of ambition of the cultural policy of the executive).
- 25 September – Former Prime Minister Manuel Valls announces his candidacy for mayor of Barcelona in the framework of the municipal elections of Spain in 2019. He announces his resignation from his mandate as deputy for the 1st constituency of Essonne.
- 27 September – Barbara Cassin receives the CNRS Gold medal.

=== October ===
- 2 October – Gérard Collomb resigns as Minister of the Interior to resume his post as Mayor of Lyon.
- 3 October – Arrest of Rédoine Faïd.
- 5 October – National tribute to singer Charles Aznavour, died on October 1.
- 10 October – Two people lose their lives in floods in Sainte-Maxime because of a Mediterranean episode (178 mm fell).
- 11 October – Resignation of 69 mayors and councilors of the department of Indre to protest against the closure of the Le Blanc maternity ward.
- 15 October – A very violent Mediterranean episode, an indirect consequence of hurricane Leslie, causes exceptional flash floods in the Aude, with accumulations of exceptional rains (295 mm in Trèbes in 12 hours, close to 300 mm in Carcassonne), which kill 15 people (including 9 in Trèbes). The city of Trèbes and the villages of Villegailhenc, Villalier, Villardonnel and Saint-Couat-d'Aude are ravaged. This is the worst flood in the region since 1999.
- 16 October – Philippe government reshuffle : Christophe Castaner becomes Minister of the Interior, Didier Guillaume Minister of Agriculture, Franck Riester Minister of Culture and Marc Fesneau becomes Minister in charge of Relations with Parliament.
- 17 October – Creation of the National Assembly's parliamentary group, Liberties and Territories.

=== November ===
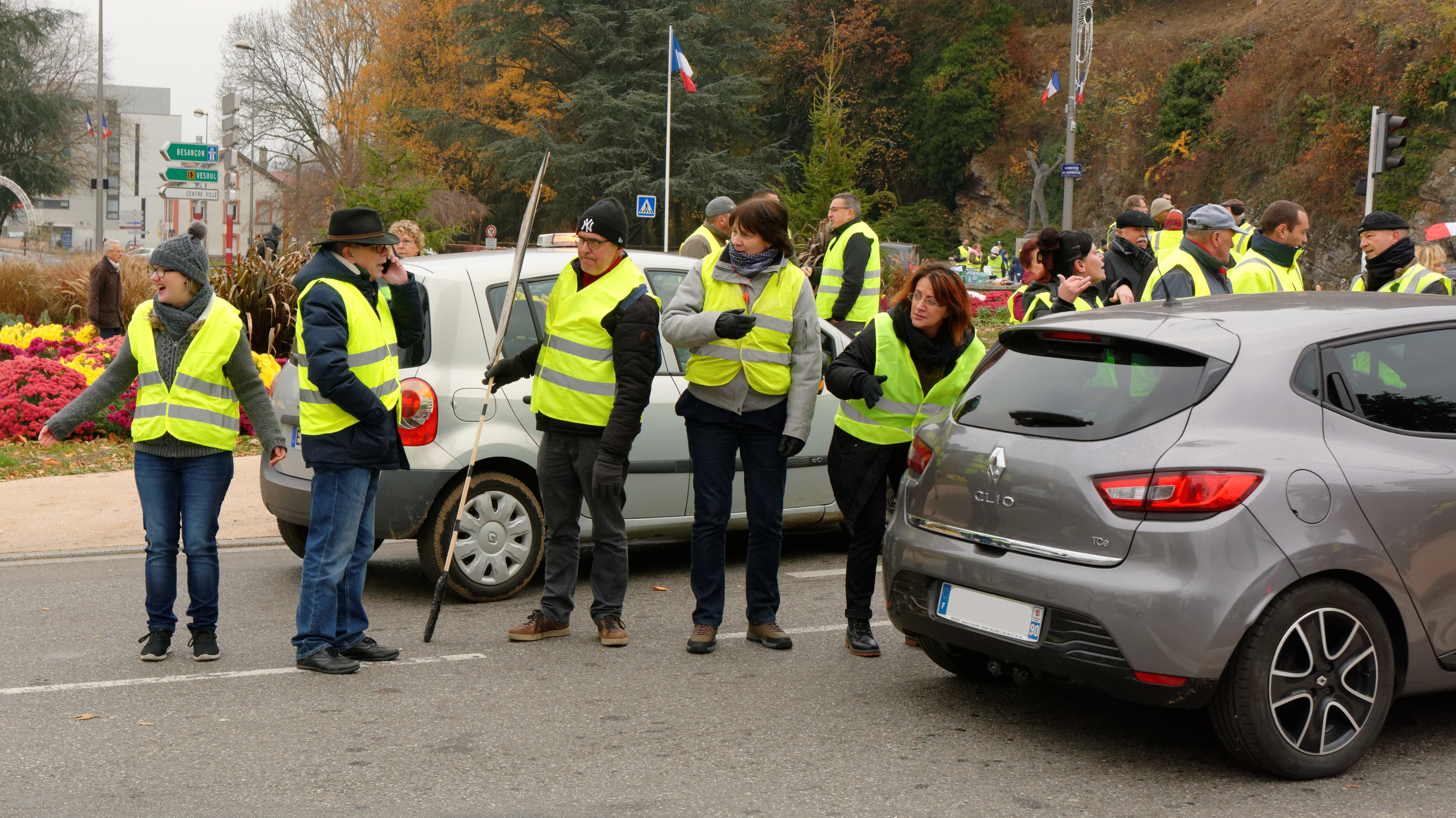
Gilets jaunes in Belfort

- 4 November – 2018 New Caledonian independence referendum
- 5 November — collapse of buildings, rue d'Aubagne in Marseille
- 17 November – Beginning of the Gilets jaunes protests.
- 18 November – 2018 Essonne's 1st constituency by-election.

=== December ===
- 11 December – 2018 Strasbourg attack.
- 15 December – Vaimalama Chaves is elected Miss France 2019.
- 29 December – Joachim Son-Forget, member of the French National Assembly for Sixth constituency for French residents overseas, leaves both the party La République En Marche! and the La République En Marche group at the French National Assembly.

== Deaths ==
=== January ===
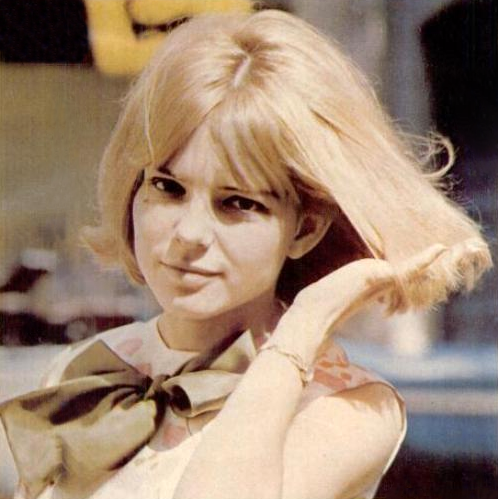
France Gall

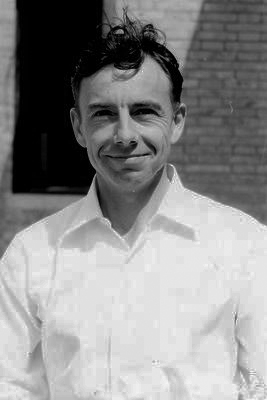
Jean-Louis Koszul

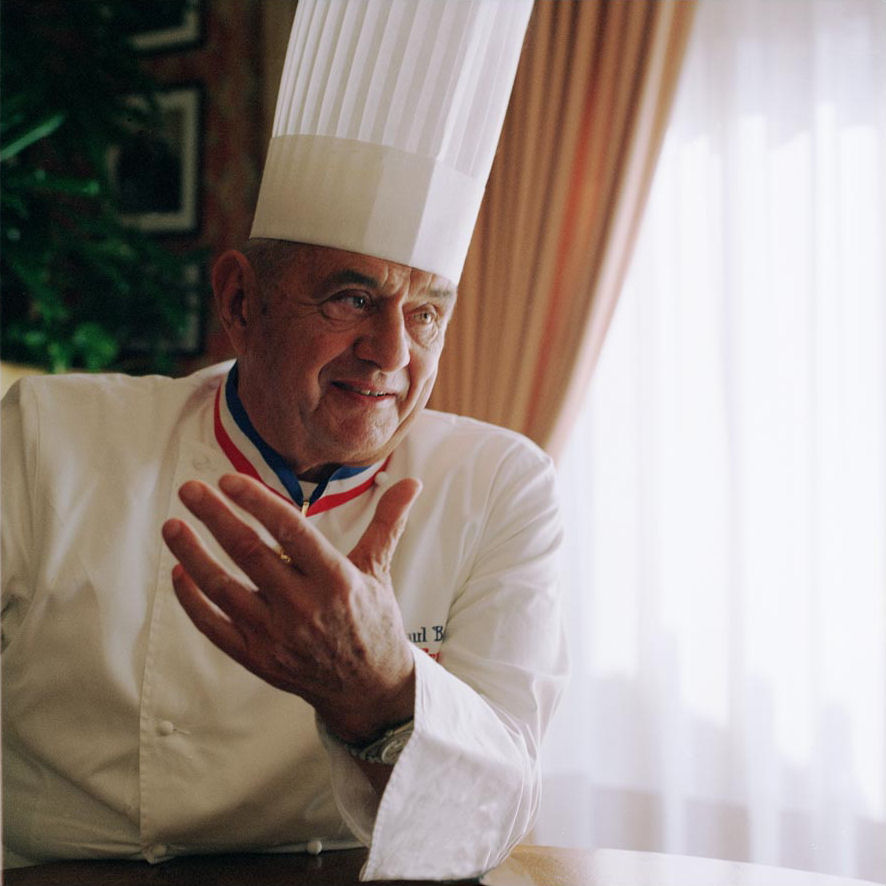
Paul Bocuse

- 4 January –
  - Lyli Herse, racing cyclist (born 1928)
  - Divi Kervella, writer (born 1957)
- 7 January – France Gall, singer (born 1947)
- 9 January – Jean-Marc Mazzonetto, rugby union player (b. 1983)
- 10 January –
  - Étienne Bally, sprinter (b. 1923)
  - Pierre Grillet, footballer (b. 1932)
  - Philippe Marchand, politician (b. 1939)
- 12 January –
  - Pierre Pincemaille, organist (b. 1956)
  - Jean-Louis Koszul, mathematician (b. 1921)
- 17 January –
  - Guy Dupré, writer and publisher (b. 1928)
  - Bénédicte Pesle, arts patron (b. 1927)
  - Claude Prouvoyeur, politician (b. 1927)
- 19 January –
  - Alain Devaquet, politician (b. 1942)
  - Marcel Frémiot, composer and musicologist (b. 1920)
- 20 January – Paul Bocuse, chef (b. 1926)
- 21 January –
  - Yves Afonso, actor (b. 1944)
  - Suzanne Citron, historian (b. 1922)
  - Philippe Gondet, footballer (b. 1942)
- 24 January – Renaud Gagneux, composer (b. 1947)
- 25 January – Arnaud Giovaninetti, actor (b. 1967)
- 28 January – Raymond Lory, politician (b. 1926)

=== February ===
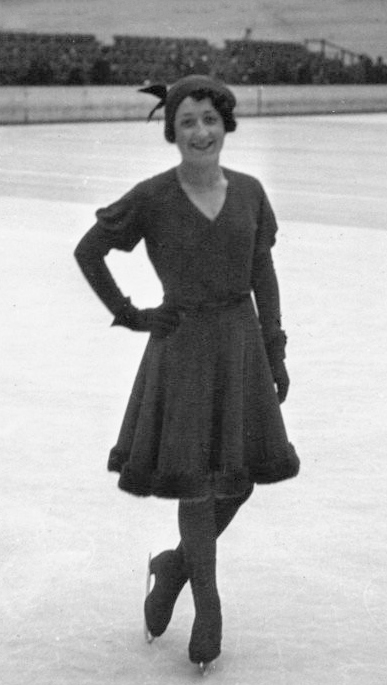
Jacqueline Vaudecrane

- 1 February –
  - André Baudry, magazine editor (b. 1922)
  - Édouard Ferrand, politician (b. 1965)
- 5 February – Mathieu Riboulet, writer and film director (b. 1960)
- 6 February – Bernard Darmet, racing cyclist (b. 1945)
- 9 February –
  - Antoine Culioli, linguist (b. 1924)
  - Bernard Koura, painter (b. 1923)
- 12 February – Françoise Xenakis, writer (b. 1930)
- 13 February – Joseph Bonnel, footballer (b.1939)
- 15 February –
  - Jacques Hébert, politician (b. 1920)
  - Daniel Vernet, journalist and author (b. 1945)
- 18 February –
  - Victor Franco, journalist (b. 1930)
  - Didier Lockwood, jazz violinist (b. 1956)
- 20 February – Arnaud Geyre, racing cyclist (b. 1935)
- 27 February –
  - Henri Leonetti, footballer (b. 1937)
  - Jacqueline Vaudecrane, figure skater (b. 1913)
- 28 February – Pierre Milza, historian (b. 1932)

=== March ===
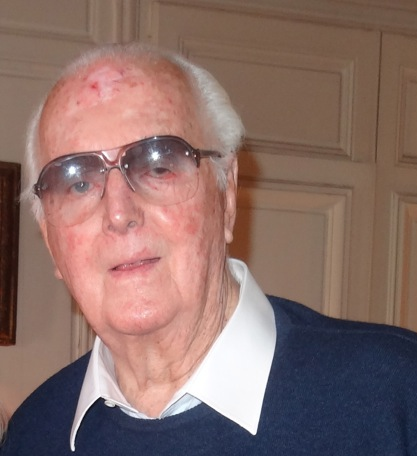
Hubert de Givenchy

- 3 March –
  - Jacques Gernet, sinologist (b. 1921)
  - Yvon Taillandier, artist (b. 1926)
- 5 March – André S. Labarthe, actor, film producer and director (b. 1931)
- 6 March – Francis Piasecki, footballer (b. 1951)
- 8 March – Jean Jolivet, philosopher (b. 1925)
- 10 March –
  - Hubert de Givenchy, fashion designer, founder of the house of Givenchy (b. 1927)
  - Michel Raynaud, mathematician (b. 1938)
- 16 March – Guy Cury, hurdler (b. 1930)
- 17 March – Geneviève Fontanel, actress (b. 1936)
- 19 March – Jean Michel Larrasket, engineer (b. 1950)
- 24 March – Arnaud Beltrame, gendarme, (b. 1973)
- 27 March –
  - Stéphane Audran, actress (b. 1932)
  - Luc Jalabert, rejoneador (b. 1951)
- 28 March – Clément Rosset, philosopher and writer (b. 1939)

=== April ===
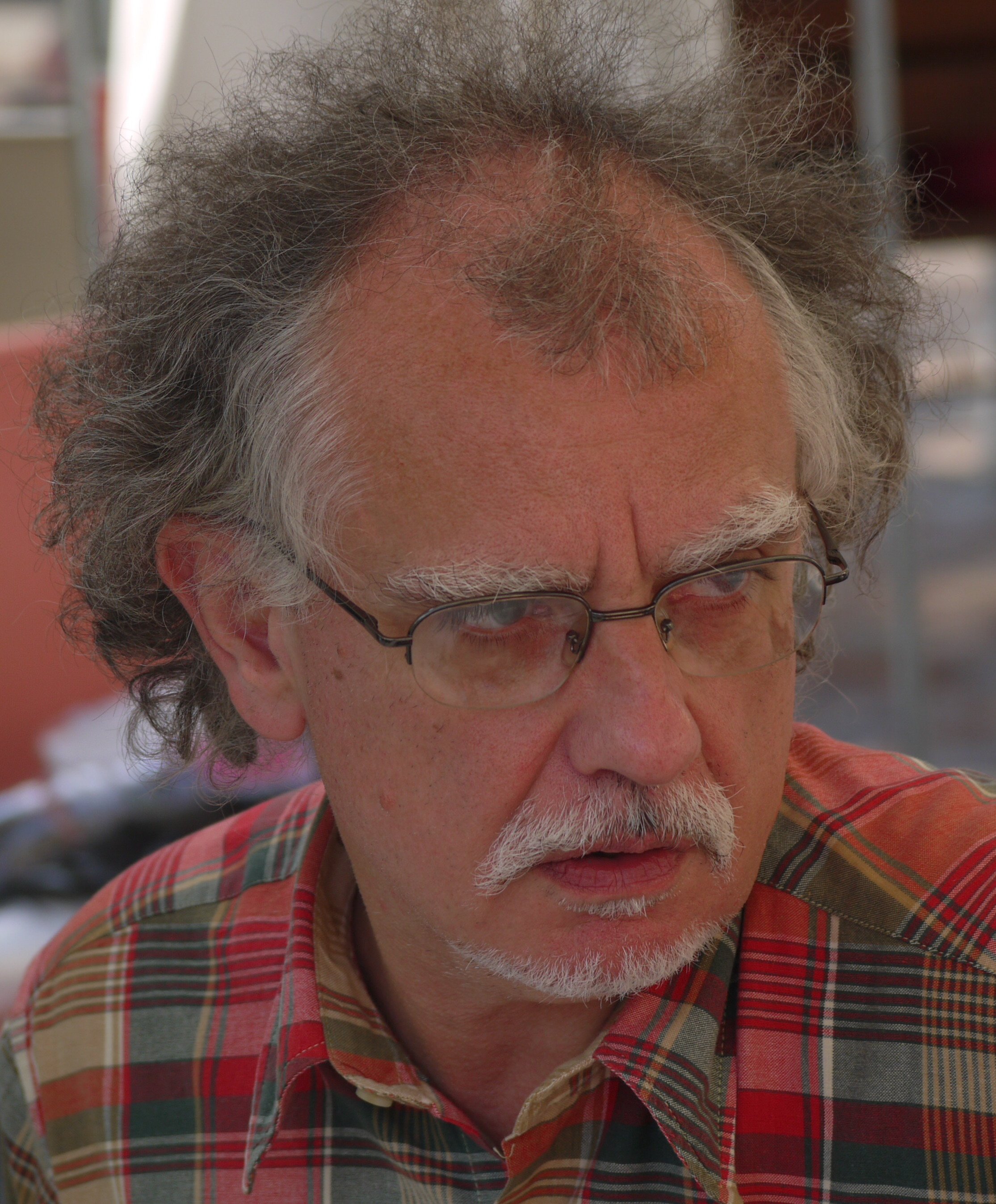
F'Murr in 2009

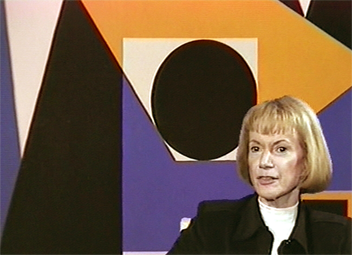
Geneviève Claisse in 1995

- 1 April
  - Françoise Adret, ballerina and choreographer (b. 1920)
  - Michel Sénéchal, tenor (b. 1927)
- 2 April – Paul Sinibaldi, footballer (b. 1921)
- 3 April
  - Irma Rapuzzi, politician (b. 1910)
  - Jacques Tixier, archaeologist and prehistorian (b. 1925)
- 6 April – Jacques Higelin, pop singer (b. 1940)
- 8 April – André Lerond, footballer (b. 1930)
- 10 April – Richard Peyzaret, better known by his pen name F'Murr, comics artist (b. 1946)
- 11 April – Jean-Claude Servan-Schreiber, politician and journalist (b. 1918)
- 13 April – André Maman, politician and philologist (b. 1927)
- 14 April – Jean-Claude Malgoire, conductor (b. 1940)
- 18 April – Jean Flori, medieval historian (b. 1936)
- 19 April
  - Joël Santoni, film director and screenwriter (b. 1943)
  - Agnès-Marie Valois, nun and World War II nurse (b. 1914)
- 21 April – Firmin Le Bourhis, crime fiction writer (b. 1950)
- 24 April – Henri Michel, footballer (b. 1947)
- 26 April
  - Jean Duprat, politician (b. 1936)
  - Pierre Plateau, Roman Catholic prelate (b. 1924)
- 29 April – Rose Laurens, singer-songwriter (b. 1953)
- 30 April – Geneviève Claisse, abstract painter (b. 1935)

=== May ===
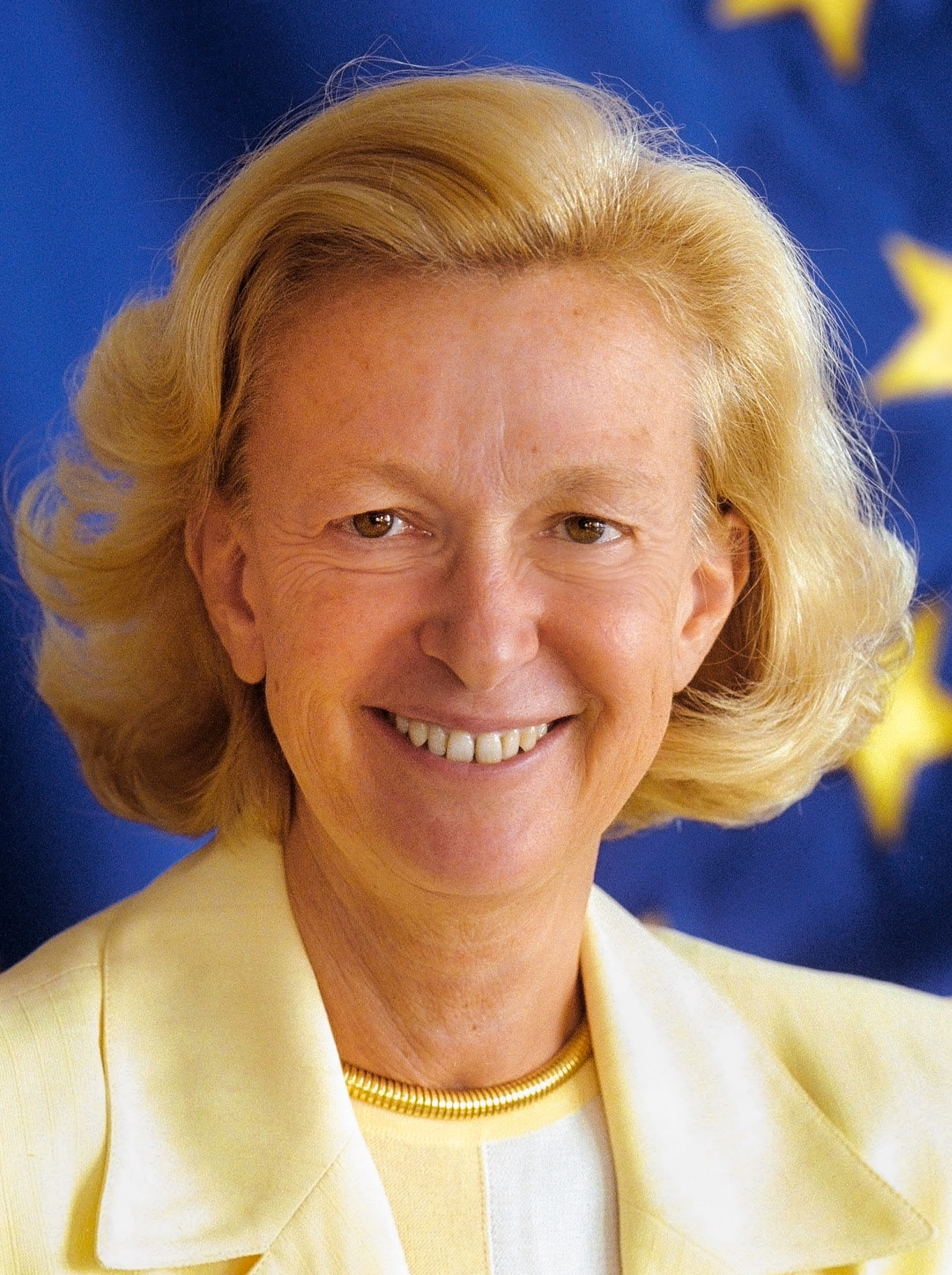
Nicole Fontaine in 2002

- 4 May –
  - Lionel Lamy, footballer (b. 1943)
  - André Le Dissez, cyclist (b. 1929)
- 6 May – Jean-Claude Decagny, politician (b. 1939)
- 11 May – Gérard Genette, literary theorist (b. 1930)
- 13 May – Lucien Villa, politician (b. 1922)
- 15 May – Jean-Claude Lamy, journalist (b. 1941)
- 17 May – Nicole Fontaine, lawyer and politician, President of the European Parliament (b. 1942)
- 28 May
  - Paulette Coquatrix, costume designer (b. 1916)
  - Serge Dassault, businessman and politician (b. 1925)
  - Yves de Daruvar, military officer and politician (b. 1921)

=== June ===
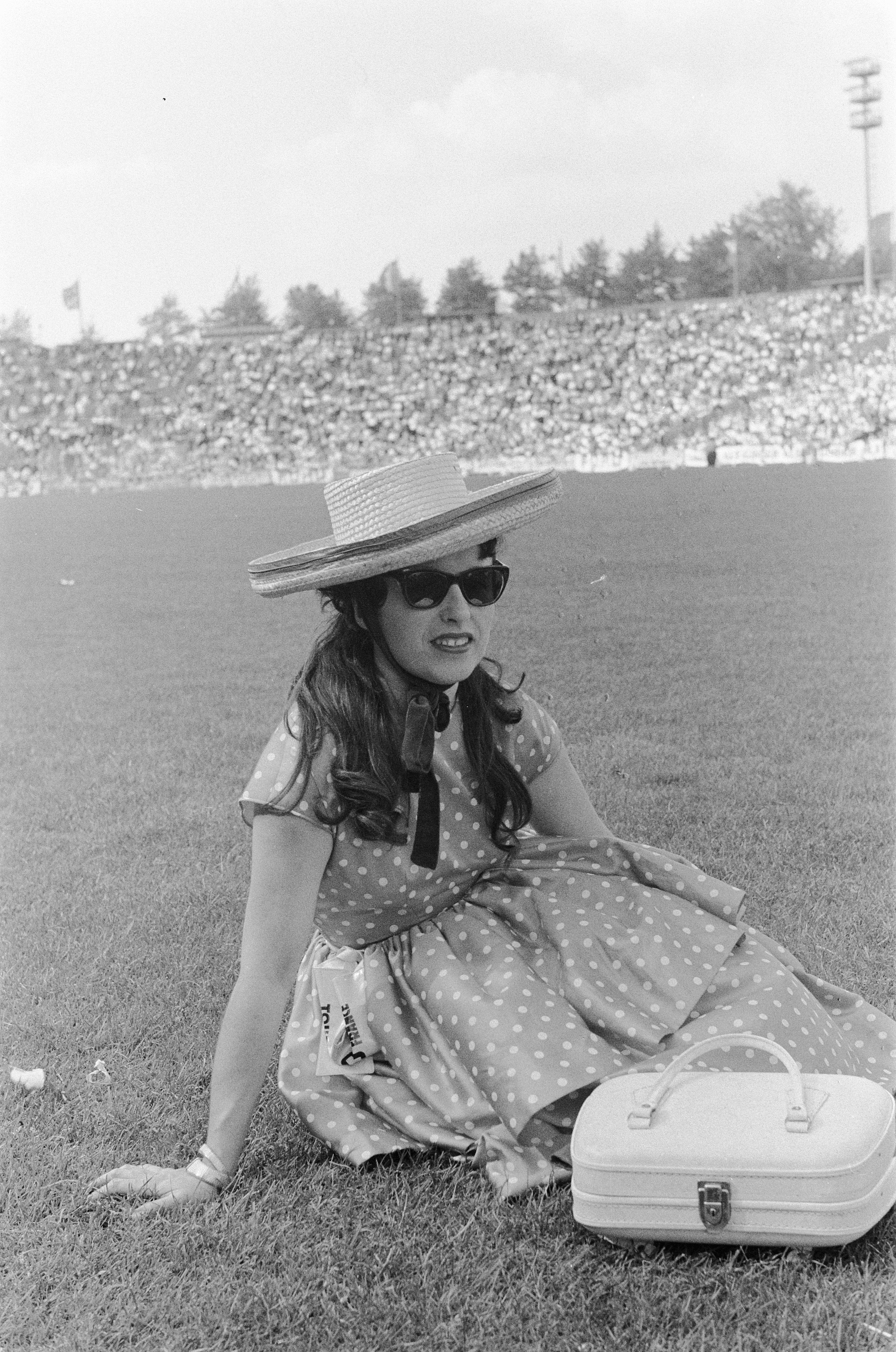
Yvette Horner in 1960

- 1 June –
  - Jean-Claude Boulard, politician, (b. 1943)
  - René Séjourné, Roman Catholic prelate, Bishop of Saint-Flour (b. 1930)
- 2 June – André Desvages, racing cyclist (b. 1944)
- 9 June – Françoise Bonnot, film editor, Oscar winner 1970 for Z (b. 1939)
- 11 June –
  - Marcel Hénaff, philosopher and anthropologist (b. 1942)
  - Yvette Horner, accordionist (b. 1922)
- 19 June – Paul John Marx, Roman Catholic prelate, Bishop of Kerema (Papua New Guinea) (b. 1935)
- 24 June – Jacques Saadé, shipping executive (b. 1937)

=== July ===
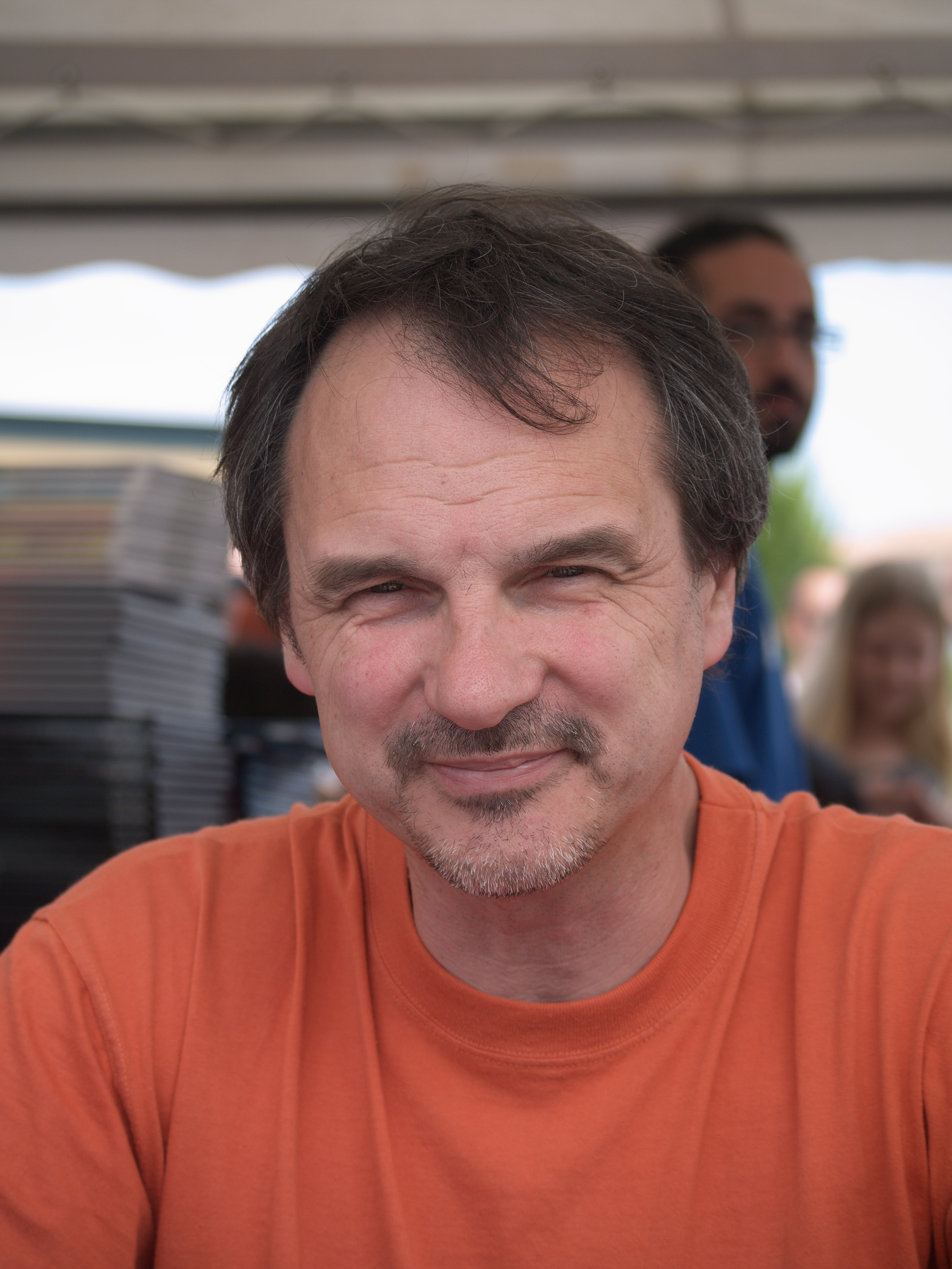
Frank Giroud in 2010

- 1 July – François Corbier, songwriter and television presenter (b. 1944)
- 2 July –
  - Henri Froment-Meurice, diplomat (b. 1923)
  - Maurice Lemaître, artist (b. 1926)
- 3 July –
  - Thérèse Kleindienst, librarian (b. 1916)
  - Henri Martre, telecommunications engineer (b. 1928)
- 4 July – Georges-Emmanuel Clancier, poet and novelist (b. 1914)
- 5 July –
  - François Budet, singer-songwriter, novelist, and poet (b. 1940)
  - Claude Lanzmann, filmmaker (b. 1925)
  - Gerald Messadié, scientific journalist, historian, essayist and novelist (b. 1931)
  - Michel Suffran, novelist (b. 1931)
  - Jean-Louis Tauran, Roman Catholic cardinal (b. 1943)
- 7 July – Prince Michel of Bourbon-Parma, royal, soldier and race car driver (b. 1926)
- 12 July – Alain Fauré, politician (b. 1962)
- 13 July –
  - Frank Giroud, comics writer (b. 1956)
  - Luc Rosenzweig, journalist and non-fiction writer (b. 1943)
  - Claude Seignolle, writer (b. 1917)
- 16 July – Madeleine Kamman, chef and restaurateur (b. 1931)
- 23 July – Pierre Pican, bishop (b. 1935)
- 25 July – Guy Fallot, cellist (b. 1927)

=== August ===
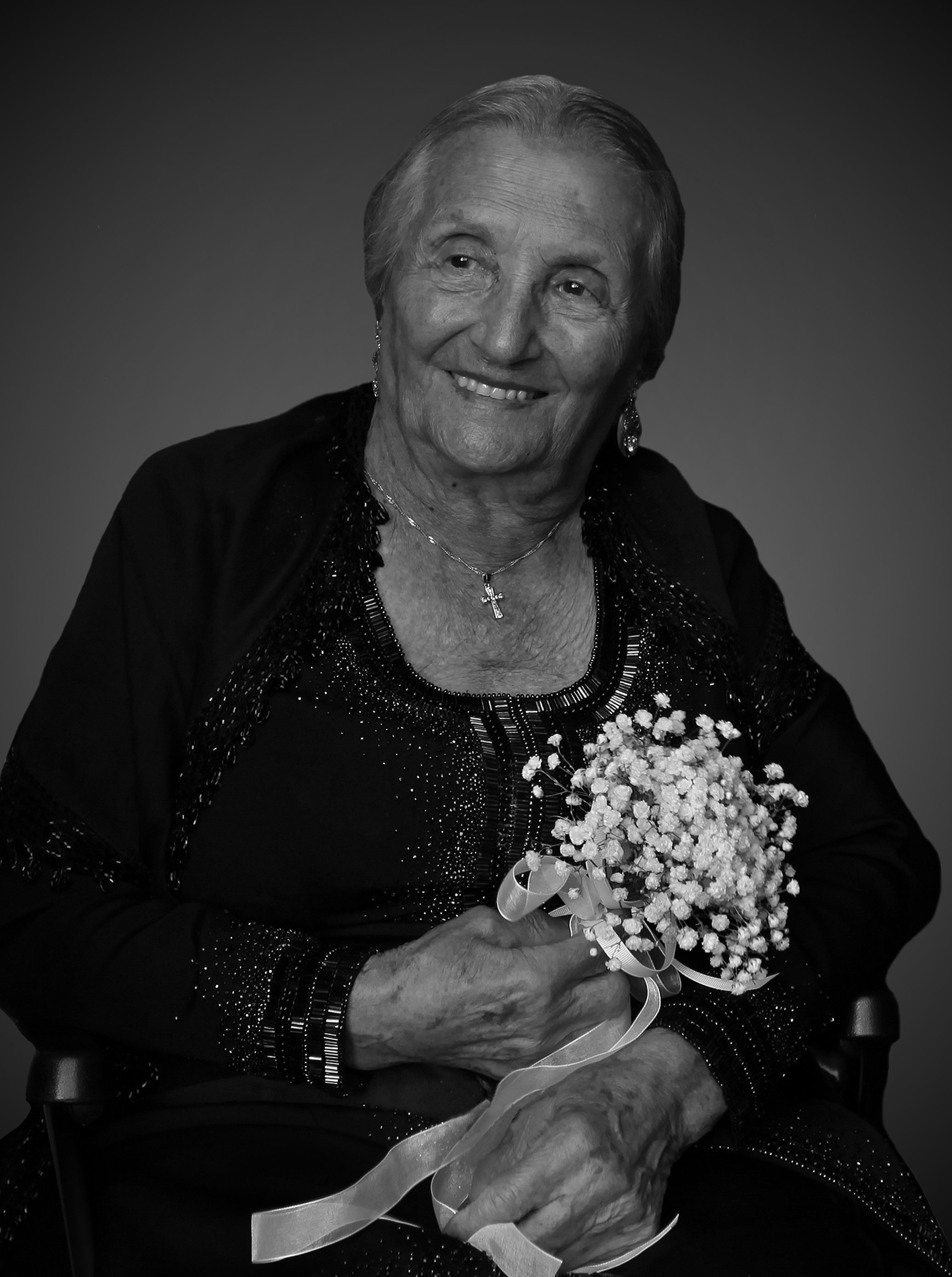
Rosa Bouglione

- 2 August – Armand de Las Cuevas, racing cyclist (b. 1968)
- 4 August –
  - Josy Moinet, politician, Senator for Charente-Maritime (b. 1929)
  - Arsène Tchakarian, Armenian-born French resistance fighter (b. 1916)
- 15 August –
  - Marie-Françoise Bucquet, pianist and teacher (b. 1937)
  - Pierre Camou, rugby union administrator (b. 1945)
  - François Garnier, Roman Catholic prelate, Archbishop of Cambrai (b. 1944)
  - Edmond Haan, footballer (b. 1924)
- 26 August – Rosa Bouglione, circus performer (b. 1910)
- 27 August – Mirka Mora, visual artist (born 1928)

=== September ===
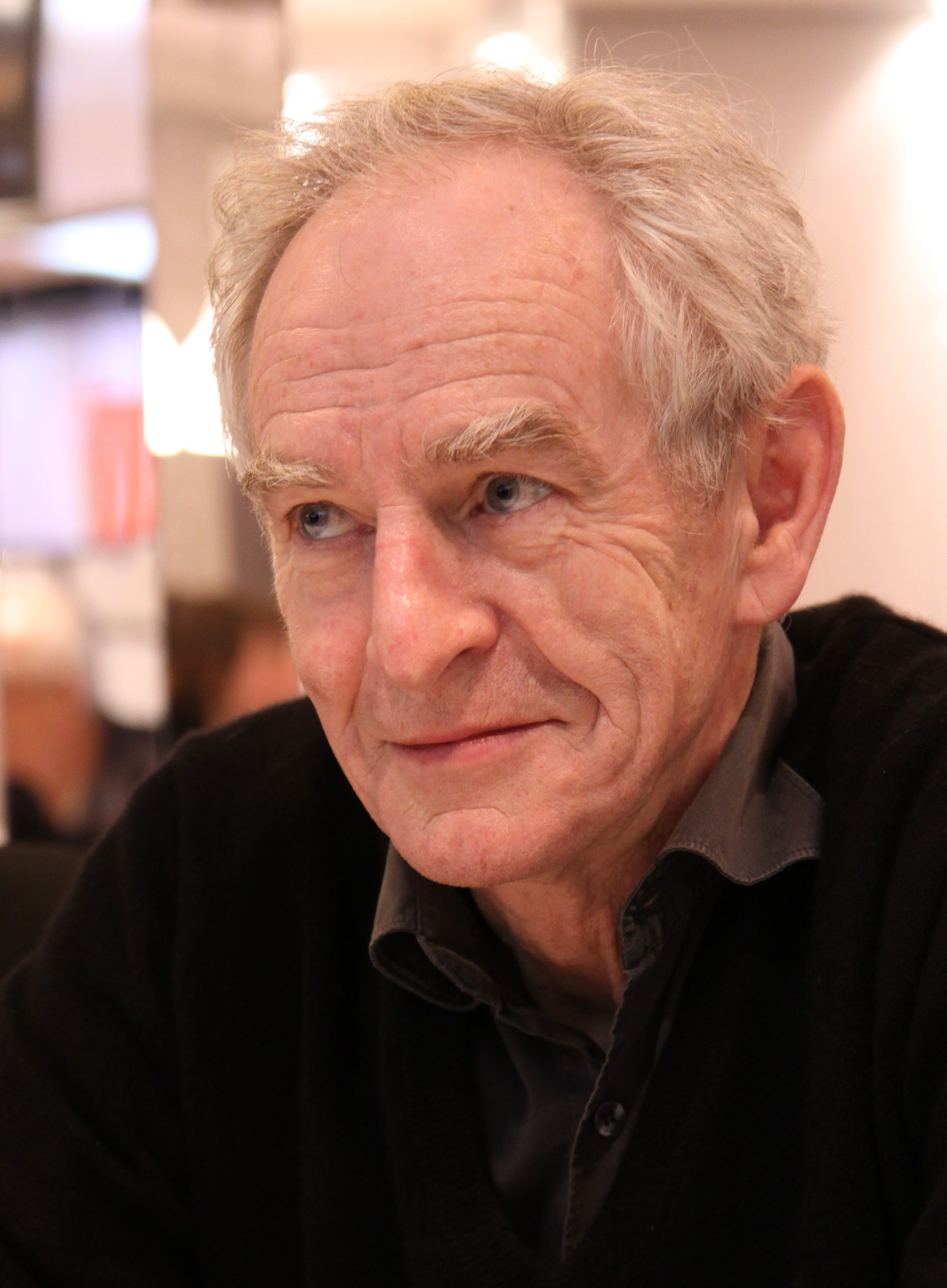
René Pétillon

- 1 September – Jean Seitlinger, politician (born 1924)
- 5 September – François Flohic, naval officer (born 1920)
- 6 September –
  - Philippe Eidel, music producer (born 1956)
  - Gilbert Lazard, linguist and Iranologist (born 1920)
- 7 September – Micheline Rozan, stage and film producer (born 1928)
- 10 September –
  - Michel Bonnevie, basketball player (born 1921)
  - Paul Virilio, urbanist (born 1932)
- 10 September –
  - Marceline Loridan-Ivens, writer and film director (born 1928)
  - Jean Piat, actor and writer (born 1924)
- 21 September – Sophie Body-Gendrot, political scientist, criminologist and sociologist (born 1942)
- 29 September – Pascale Casanova, literary critic (born 1959)
- 30 September – René Pétillon, cartoonist and comics artist (born 1945)

=== December ===
- December 5 – Marie-Thérèse Bourquin, French lawyer and first female member of the Belgian council estate (b. 1916)
- December 28 – Georges Loinger, French resistance fighter (b. 1910)

== See also ==
- List of French films of 2018
