= Prix Moron =

French philosophy prize

Le prix Moron or Grand prix Moron is the annual prix de l'Académie française in philosophy from the Fondation Renaudin, created in 1987 and "awarded to the French author of a book or work promoting a new ethic."

== List of laureates ==
=== 1990s ===
- 1991:
  - Raymond Boudon for L'art de se persuader, des idées douteuses, fragiles ou fausses
  - Silver medal: Michel Lacroix (philosopher) for De la politesse. Essai sur la littérature du savoir-vivre
- 1992:
  - Alain Finkielkraut for Le Mécontemporain: Charles Péguy, lecteur du monde moderne
  - Ruby medal: Michel Maffesoli for La Transfiguration du politique
- 1993: Jacques Testart for Le Désir du gène
- 1994: Nayla Farouki for La Relativité
- 1995: Jean de Maillard for Crimes et lois
- 1996: Marcel Conche for l'ensemble de son œuvre (entire body of work)
- 1997: Agnès Minazzoli for L’Homme sans image. Une anthropologie négative
- 1998: Anne Baudart for La Morale et sa philosophie
- 1999: Lucien Jerphagnon for l'édition des Œuvres de saint Augustin

=== 2000s ===
- 2000: Prix non décerné (Prize not awarded)
- 2001: Régis Debray for Introduction à la médiologie et Cours de médiologie
- 2002: Marcel Hénaff for Le Prix de la Vérité: Le don, l’argent, la philosophie
- 2003: Christiane Frémont for Singularités, Individus et religions dans le système de Leibniz
- 2004: Marc Lachièze-Rey for Au-delà de l'Espace et du temps: La nouvelle physique
- 2005: Florence Ehnuel for L'Amour conjugué: essai sur le conjugal et l'adultère
- 2006: Pascal Picq for Nouvelle histoire de l’Homme
- 2007: Trịnh Xuân Thuận, professor of astronomy at the University of Virginia for his book on vulgarization Les Voies de la lumière: Physique et métaphysique du clair-obscur
- 2008: Pierre Manent for Enquête sur la démocratie. Études de philosophie politique
- 2009: Dominique Guillo for Des chiens et des humains

=== 2010s ===
- 2010: Claude Romano for l'ensemble de son œuvre sur la phénoménologie (for his entire body of work on phenomenology (philosophy)
- 2011: Not awarded
- 2012: Corine Pelluchon for Éléments pour une éthique de la vulnérabilité. Les hommes, les animaux, la nature
- 2013: Sylviane Agacinski for Femmes entre sexe et genre
- 2014: Jean-Marc Drouin for « Philosophie de l’insecte »
- 2015: Olivier Houdé for Apprendre à résister
- 2016: Jacques Lecomte for La Bonté humaine. Altruisme, empathie, générosité
- 2017: Luc-Alain Giraldeau for Dans l’œil du pigeon. Évolution, hérédité et culture
- 2018: Frédéric Worms for l'ensemble de son œuvre (for his entire body of work)
- 2019: Barbara Stiegler for « Il faut s’adapter ». Sur un nouvel impératif politique

=== 2020s ===
- 2020: Édouard Mehl for Descartes et la fabrique du monde. Le problème cosmologique de Copernic à Descartes
- 2021: Vinciane Despret for l'ensemble de son œuvre (for her entire body of work)
- 2022: Sandra Laugier for l'ensemble de ses travaux philosophiques (for her entire body of work on philosophy)
- 2023: Jean-Marie Salamito for Travailleuses, travailleurs ! Les Pères de l’Église et l’économie
- 2024: Daniel S. Milo for La Survie des médiocres. Critique du darwinisme et du capitalisme
- 2025: François Cassingena-Trévedy for Paysan de Dieu
- 2026: Emmanuel Falque for l'ensemble de son œuvre (entire body of work)

== See also ==
- Académie française
- Prix de l'Académie française
