= Taillandier (surname) =

Taillandier is a French surname. Notable people with the surname include:

- Albert Taillandier (born 1879), French racing cyclist.
- François Taillandier (born 1955), a French writer.
- Saint-René Taillandier (1817–1879), French writer and critic.
- Maurice Taillandier (1876–1932), French fencer.
- Jean Taillandier (born 1938), French former football goalkeeper.
- Yvon Taillandier (born 1926), French artist, author and critic.
