= Jacques Lecomte =

French psychologist

- Born: 14 December 1955 (age 70)
- Citizenship: French
- Known for: Positive psychology, resilience
- Awards: Grand prix Moron (2016)
- Scientific career
- Fields: Psychology
- Doctoral advisor: Étienne Mullet
- Website: jacqueslecomte.com

Jacques Lecomte (born 14 December 1955) is a French psychologist and former journalist known for his work on positive psychology and resilience. He holds a doctorate in psychology and has taught at Paris Nanterre University in the department of education sciences and at the Faculty of Social Sciences of the Catholic University of Paris.

== Career ==
From 1992 to 1998, Lecomte was in charge of the psychology section of the French magazine Sciences Humaines. He then wrote a doctoral thesis on resilience after child abuse, supervised by Étienne Mullet and completed in 2002. The thesis is titled Briser le cycle de la violence: quand d'anciens enfants maltraités deviennent des parents non-maltraitants (Breaking the cycle of violence: when abused children grow up to become parents who do not mistreat their own children).

Lecomte is honorary president of the French and Francophone Association of Positive Psychology (Association française et francophone de psychologie positive), founded in October 2009. The association brings together academics, practitioners and others who share an interest in positive psychology.

In 2016, the Académie française awarded him the Grand prix Moron for his book La bonté humaine, a prize given to a work that promotes a new approach to ethics.

== Selected publications ==
- Le Bonheur est toujours possible: construire la résilience (Happiness is always possible: building resilience), with Stefan Vanistendael. Paris: Bayard, 2000.
- Guérir de son enfance (Healing from one's childhood). Paris: Odile Jacob, 2004.
- Donner un sens à sa vie (Giving meaning to one's life). Paris: Odile Jacob, 2007.
- Maxi-fiches de psychologie: courants, débats, applications (Psychology fact sheets: schools, debates, applications). Paris: Dunod, 2008.
- Introduction à la psychologie positive (Introduction to positive psychology), editor. Paris: Dunod, 2009.
- La résilience: se reconstruire après un traumatisme (Resilience: rebuilding after trauma). Paris: Éditions Rue d'Ulm, 2010.
- Élixir de bonheur (Elixir of happiness). Paris: InterÉditions, 2010.
- La bonté humaine: altruisme, empathie, générosité (Human kindness: altruism, empathy, generosity). Paris: Odile Jacob, 2012.
- Les 30 notions de la psychologie (The 30 key concepts of psychology). Paris: Dunod, 2013. Revised edition of Maxi-fiches de psychologie.
- Les entreprises humanistes (Humanist companies). Paris: Les Arènes, 2016.
- Le monde va beaucoup mieux que vous ne le croyez ! (The world is doing much better than you think). Paris: Les Arènes, 2017.
- Rien n'est joué: la science contre les théories de l'effondrement (Nothing is settled: science against collapse theories). Paris: Les Arènes, 2023.
