= Samuel Beckett: Anatomy of a Literary Revolution =

1997 book by Pascale Casanova

- Cover of the English-language hardcover edition
- Author: Pascale Casanova
- Original title: Beckett l'abstracteur. Anatomie d'une révolution littéraire
- Translator: Gregory Elliott
- Language: French
- Subject: Literary criticism
- Publisher: Verso
- Publication date: 1997
- Publication place: France
- English publication date: 2006
- Media type: Print
- ISBN: 978-1-84467-112-0
- OCLC: 72868785
- Dewey Decimal: 848.91409
- LC Class: PR6003.E282 Z58713 2006

Samuel Beckett: Anatomy of a Literary Revolution is a 1997 book by French literary critic Pascale Casanova about the Nobel Prize-winning Irish playwright, novelist and poet Samuel Beckett. She contends that rather than the representative of literary existentialism that he is popularly understood to be, Beckett is best viewed as a creator of a highly autonomous form of literature, that is, a literature that is largely devoid of external references. The book was published in English translation in 2006.

== Overview ==
Casanova begins her study by noting that Beckett has received a secular canonization based on a misunderstanding of his work. She contends that the view of Beckett as an "oracle of being," a view popularized by Maurice Blanchot, is not supported by close attention to Beckett's work. Rather, through a lengthy period of struggle both with his Irish literary homeland and more specifically with the legacy of his friend and mentor James Joyce, Beckett ultimately emerged as an avatar of literary autonomy: a literature of failure that reflects on the writer's process of writing. In pursuing this path, Beckett ultimately produced works that only refer to themselves. Casanova draws upon the varied corpus of Beckett's texts, including not only his poems, plays, and fictional works, but also his art criticism, to show that he was deeply influenced by modernist visual arts, especially the works of Bram van Velde. Casanova concludes her study by saying:

This challenge to the foundations of literature could only be mounted by a writer who all his life put himself in impossible literary situations. Probably no one has occupied so many reputedly untenable positions; no one has been attached to so many impossible aesthetics. To create an upheaval worthy of Joyce without following him on the path of the "apotheosis of the word" compelled Beckett to think that very constraint and inaugurate a different branch of literary modernity, the "literature of the unword."

== Reception ==
John Banville discussed Samuel Beckett: Anatomy of a Literary Revolution in the New York Review of Books and offered qualified praise for Casanova's book, describing it as "fascinating, contentious, and somewhat muddled." Banville questioned Casanova's assertion that with his late work Worstword Ho, “Beckett created a pure object of language, which is totally autonomous since it refers to nothing but itself.” Banville observed that Casanova's statement about Worstword Ho was contradicted by Casanova's statement, earlier in the book that “One cannot advance the hypothesis of an absolute independence of the text with respect to the world, grammar and literary convention.”

Martin Harries reviewed the book in Modernism/Modernity, and demonstrated how it "is in many senses a redaction of her The World Republic of Letters." Harries points to several parallel passages from the two books as evidence that Casanova "cannibalized" the Beckett book for the later publication. Despite these qualms, Harries found value in the way Casanova's study offers "an intriguing reading of the political import of Beckett’s work." After conceding this merit, Harries contends that there is an "incoherence" at the heart of Casanova's reading of Beckett, stating that "Casanova’s historical account of literature cannot ground the value she assigns to modernism. Indeed, it might seem that the logic of her argument would lead her to value precisely the local and nationally committed literatures she recognizes and yet generally dismisses." Harries concludes: "Casanova’s problematic attachment to the very modernist ideal of autonomy her scholarship challenges is not some fluke. Her work may make readers more acutely aware of their own divided allegiances."

Writing in Theatre Journal, Gregory Byala offered a highly laudatory appraisal of Samuel Beckett: Anatomy of a Literary Revolution. Byala praises Casanova's "formidable strengths as a reader" that help her articulate her "sense of Beckett as an author who is attempting to bring into literature the kind of abstraction available in modern painting, music, and sculpture."

The value of Casanova's study, Byala contends, is in her account of Beckett's later literary project "as an attempt to construct purely hermetic texts in which the words function exclusively in relation to the motive force that organizes them, a relation that she describes as "abstractification." Byala concludes: "Casanova's study represents a meaningful engagement with Beckett, even if the critical revolution that it seeks to inaugurate is not as revolutionary as we are asked to believe."

== Sources ==
- Banville, John (22 March 2012). "Storming for Beauty". The New York Review of Books. 59 (5).
- Byala, Gregory (October 2007). "Samuel Beckett: Anatomy of a Literary Revolution (review)". Theatre Journal. 59 (3: Theatre and Translation): 526–527. doi:10.1353/tj.2007.0130. JSTOR 25070091.
- Casanova, Pascale (2006). Samuel Beckett: Anatomy of a Literary Revolution. Translated by Elliott, Gregory. New York: Verso. ISBN 978-1-84467-112-0.
- Harries, Martin (November 2007). "Samuel Beckett: Anatomy of a Literary Revolution (review)". Modernism/Modernity. 14 (4): 781–783. doi:10.1353/mod.2007.0085.
