= A History of the Devil =

Book by Gerald Messadié

- Author: Gerald Messadié
- Original title: Histoire Générale du Diable
- Translator: Marc Romano
- Series: Kodansha Globe Series
- Genre: Religion; History
- Published: 1993 by (Kodansha International)
- Publication place: France
- English publication date: 1 June 1996 by (Kodansha America, Incorporated)
- Media type: Hardcover
- Pages: 377
- ISBN: 9781568361987
- Dewey Decimal: 291.2/16
- Preceded by: L'incendiaire: Vie de Saul, apotre (1991)
- Followed by: L'affaire Marie Madeleine (2001)

A History of the Devil is a book by Gerald Messadié published in 1996. The book was originally published in France in 1993 as Histoire Générale du Diable, and was translated into English by Marc Romano.

== Contents ==
1. The Ambiguous Demons of Oceania
2. India: Spared from Evil
3. China and Japan: Exorcism through Writing
4. Zoroaster, the First Ayatollahs, and the True Birth of the Devil
5. Mesopotamia: The Appearance of Sin
6. The Celts: Thirty-five Centuries without the Devil
7. Greece: The Devil Driven Out by Democracy
8. Rome: The Devil Banned
9. Egypt: Unthinkable Damnation
10. Africa: The Cradle of Religious Ecology
11. The North American Indians: Land and Fatherland
12. The Enigma of Quetzalcoatl: the Feathered Serpent, and the God-Who-Weeps
13. Israel: Demons as the Heavenly Servants of the Modern Devil
14. The Devil in the Early Church: The Confusion of Cause and Effect
15. The Great Night of the West: From the Middle Ages to the French Revolution
16. Islam: The Devil as State Functionary
17. Modern Times and the God of Laziness, Hatred, and Nihilism
