= Trinh Xuan Thuan =

Vietnamese-American astrophysicist

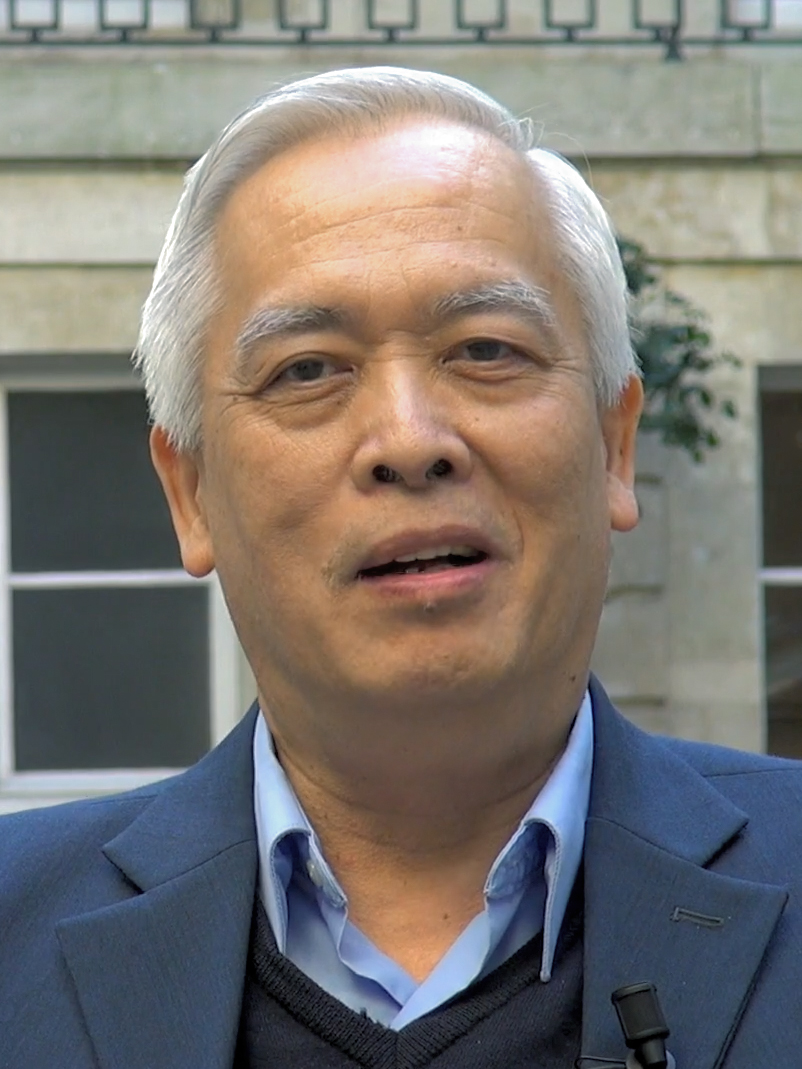
- Trịnh Xuân Thuận in 2015
- Born: Trịnh Xuân Thuận; August 20, 1948 (age 78); Từ Sơn, Bắc Ninh, North Vietnam (now Hanoi, Vietnam)
- Education: California Institute of Technology (BS); Princeton University (PhD)
- Known for: Research in galaxy formation Author of popular books
- Awards: Prix Moron (2007); Kalinga Prize (2009); Prix mondial Cino Del Duca (2012); Legion of Honor – Chevalier (2014)
- Scientific career
- Fields: Astrophysics
- Workplaces: University of Virginia
- Doctoral advisor: Lyman Spitzer

Trịnh Xuân Thuận (born August 20, 1948) is a Vietnamese-American astrophysicist.

== Biography ==
Trịnh Xuân Thuận was born in Thái Bình Village, Danh Lâm Township, Từ Sơn County, Bắc Ninh (now Đông Anh Commune of Hanoi). He completed his B.S. at the California Institute of Technology, and his Ph.D. at Princeton University. He taught astronomy at the University of Virginia, where he was a professor, starting 1976. He is a research associate at the Institut d’Astrophysique de Paris. He was a founding member of the International Society for Science and Religion.

Thuận was the recipient of UNESCO's Kalinga Prize in 2009 for his work in popularizing science. He received the Kalinga chair award at the 99th Indian Science Congress at Bhubaneswar. In 2012, he was awarded the Prix mondial Cino Del Duca from the Institut de France. This prize recognizes authors whose work, literary or scientific, constitutes a message of modern humanism. In 2014 Thuận was inducted into the French Legion of Honor as a Chevalier. Thuận's areas of interest are extragalactic astronomy and galaxy formation. His research has focused on the evolution of galaxies and the chemical composition of the universe, and on compact blue dwarf galaxies.

== Books for general readers ==
- 1992. Le destin de l'univers : Le big bang, et après, collection « Découvertes Gallimard » (nº 151), série Sciences et techniques. Paris: Éditions Gallimard.
  - 1993. UK edition – The Changing Universe: Big Bang and After, 'New Horizons' series. London: Thames & Hudson.
  - 1993. US edition – The Birth of the Universe: The Big Bang and After, "Abrams Discoveries" series. New York: Harry N. Abrams.
- 1994. The Secret Melody.
- 2000. Chaos and Harmony.
- 2001. The Quantum and the Lotus. (with Matthieu Ricard)
- 2008. Voyage au cœur de la lumière, collection « Découvertes Gallimard » (nº 527), série Sciences et techniques. Paris: Éditions Gallimard.
