= 2021 in France =

- Decades: 2000s; 2010s; 2020s; 2030s
- See also: History of France; Timeline of French history; List of years in France

Events in the year 2021 in France.

== Incumbents ==
- President – Emmanuel Macron (REM)
- Prime Minister – Jean Castex (REM)

== Events ==
Ongoing — COVID-19 pandemic in France

=== January to March ===
- 4 March – The government bans Génération Identitaire (Generation Identity), an Identitarian nationalist anti-immigration movement.
- 5 March – Member of Parliament Sophie Auconie resigns from the National Assembly.
- 7 March – Member of Parliament Olivier Dassault is killed in a plane crash.

=== April to June ===
- 21 April – The Valeurs Actuelles published an open letter, with 20 retired generals and 1,000 military personnel warning the country was heading for "civil war" due to Islamist religious extremism.
- 23 April - Rambouillet knife attack

=== July to September ===
- 17 July – Over 100,000 people protest across France against Emmanuel Macron's plan to require COVID-19 vaccinations for health workers, along with other restrictions on unvaccinated citizens.
- 23 July – 8 August – France compete at the Summer Olympics in Tokyo, Japan and win 10 gold, 12 silver, and 11 bronze medals.
- 7 August
  - Handball at the 2020 Summer Olympics – Men's tournament: France defeats Denmark, became the first country to claim the Olympic men's handball title for a third time.
  - Volleyball at the 2020 Summer Olympics – Men's tournament: France defeats Russia, becoming the first to win gold in Tokyo.
- 8 August – Handball at the 2020 Summer Olympics – Women's tournament: France defeats Russia, becoming the first to win gold in Tokyo.

=== October to December ===
- 24 November – November 2021 English Channel disaster
- 19 December - The Junior Eurovision Song Contest 2021 is held at the La Seine Musicale, and is won by Armenian singer Maléna with the song "Qami Qami".

== Deaths ==
- 9 February – Ghédalia Tazartès, musician (b. 1947)
- 22 May – Robert Marchand, cyclist (b. 1911)
- 11 July – Renée Simonot, actress (b. 1911)
- 1 September – Jean-Denis Bredin, lawyer (b. 1929)
- 6 September
  - Jean-Pierre Adams, footballer (b. 1948)
  - Jean-Paul Belmondo, actor (b. 1933)

== See also ==
=== Country overviews ===
- France
- History of France
- History of modern France
- Outline of France
- Government of France
- Politics of France
- Years in France
- Timeline of France history
- List of French films of 2021

=== Related timelines for current period ===
- 2021
- 2021 in the European Union
- 2021 in politics and government
