= Paris's 31st constituency =

Paris's 31st constituency was one of the 31 French National Assembly constituencies in the city of Paris in the period 1958–1986. When it was created it was one of the 55 constituencies in the Seine department (31 for the city of Paris, 24 for its banlieues); from 1968 it was part of the Paris department.

Map of Paris constituencies in 1981.

It was represented by Albert Marcenet, Lucien Villa, and Jean-Paul Planchou.

The constituency was abolished before the 1986 election, which used proportional representation. After this election, the 1986 redistricting of French legislative constituencies did not recreate a 31st constituency of Paris.
