= The World Republic of Letters =

1999 book by Pascale Casanova

- Cover of the English-language paperback edition
- Author: Pascale Casanova
- Original title: La république mondiale des lettres
- Translator: M. B. Debevoise
- Language: French
- Subject: Literary criticism
- Publisher: Harvard University Press
- Publication date: 1999
- Publication place: France
- English publication date: 2004
- Media type: Print
- ISBN: 978-0-674-01021-5
- OCLC: 55679060
- Dewey Decimal: 809'.894—dc22
- LC Class: PN703.C3713 2004

The World Republic of Letters is a 1999 book by French literary critic Pascale Casanova. Published in English translation in 2004, the book was hailed as an important text that applied the sociological concepts developed by Pierre Bourdieu to an analysis of the world literary system by which books are written and consecrated as important works of literature, an economy of prestige that centers on Paris as the world literary capital.

== Overview ==
The World Republic of Letters is divided into two sections: Part I, "The Literary World," and Part II, "Literary Revolts and Revolutions."

In Part I, "The Literary World," Casanova describes the nature of world literature and the structure of the world literary space, in which the path to literary consecration always leads to Paris, the world capital of literature. In order to gain worldwide acceptance and acclaim, writers from marginal countries and languages must find acceptance in the literary world of Paris.

In Part II, "Literary Revolts and Revolutions," Casanova describes the careers of representative writers whose path to literary consecration demonstrates the principles she described in the book's first part. Writers she discusses include Franz Kafka, V. S. Naipaul, Henri Michaux, E. M. Cioran, Charles-Ferdinand Ramuz, Mário de Andrade, W. B. Yeats, John Millington Synge, Sean O'Casey, George Bernard Shaw, James Joyce, Samuel Beckett, and William Faulkner.

Martin Harries, reviewing the book in Modernism/Modernity, pointed out that The World Republic of Letters includes many passages that are nearly identical to passages in Casanova's earlier book, Samuel Beckett: Anatomy of a Literary Revolution. Harries points to several parallel passages from the two books as evidence that Casanova "cannibalized" the Beckett book for the later publication. Harries went on to say that Casanova's

wholesale borrowings from the Anatomy in The World Republic suggest the importance of the example of Beckett to her scholarly project as a whole: Beckett, she argues, continues and subsumes Joyce’s modernism. And that modernism offers a paradigmatic site for her map of “world literary space.”

== Reception ==
Terry Eagleton reviewed The World Republic of Letters for the New Statesman. Eagleton praised the book highly, stating that it is in the "distinguished lineage" of critics like Erich Auerbach, Georg Lukács, and Northrop Frye, each of whom wrote studies that managed to "step back from Dante and Goethe, Balzac and Woolf, and view them, in a powerfully distancing move, as part of a meaningful constellation." Eagleton praised the "exemplary lucidity" of Casanova's book and argued that it "represents a milestone in the history of modern literary thought—even if it does voice its support for the literary underdog from that citadel of high culture, Paris."

Louis Menand, in a review published in The New Yorker, called The World Republic of Letters "rather brilliant." Menand wrote, "Literature departments are almost always organized by language and country, but Casanova's book gives us many reasons to doubt whether this captures the way literature really works."

William Deresiewicz, writing in The Nation, offered a mixed assessment of the book. Deresiewicz found that "Casanova’s work amounts to a radical remapping of global literary space–which means, first of all, the recognition that there is a global literary space." He praised the book and said that "the main thrust of Casanova’s argument, which covers roughly the last century and a half, is unimpeachable. She has created a map of global literary power relations where none had existed, and she has raised a host of further questions." However, he found weaknesses: "Casanova’s reluctance to acknowledge the positive dimensions of the international literary sphere is one of the book’s flaws." He also observed that "Casanova is also surprisingly enamored of the great-man model of historical causation."

Thomas Austenfeld, reviewing The World Republic of Letters for the South Atlantic Review, found it "ambitious and challenging." Austenfeld lauded the book's international scope, saying that "Casanova marshals a truly impressive range of references not often seen together, from Scandinavian to Romanian to Algerian to South American writers. Austenfeld further praised Casanova on the role of translation in disseminating works through the world literary system: "Casanova's observations on translation practice are truly incisive, especially when she turns her attention to Beckett and Nabokov, who functioned as self-translators and thus escaped the linguistic prison-house of a national literature." Austenfeld concluded: "This book is certain to provoke lively discussion, as any good critical study should. The wide-ranging view Casanova brings to her subject puts her in the companionship of very few literary critics capable of competing with her."

Perry Anderson, writing about Casanova's book in the London Review of Books, stated that Casanova's book was an "outstanding example of an imaginative synthesis with strong critical intent in recent years."

Aamir R. Mufti, writing in Critical Inquiry, argued that a flaw in Casanova's account is that she misunderstood the historical role of Orientalism in shaping the world literary space:

Casanova ... fails to comprehend the real nature of the expansion and rearrangement of this until then largely European space in the course of the philological revolution. It is through the philological knowledge revolution—the “discovery” of the classical languages of the East, the invention of the linguistic family tree whose basic form is still with us today, the translation and absorption into the Western languages of more and more works from Persian, Arabic, and the Indian languages, among others—that non-Western textual traditions made their first entry as literature, sacred and secular, into the international literary space that had emerged in early modern times in Europe as a structure of rivalries between the emerging vernacular traditions, transforming the scope and structure of that space forever.

Emilie Bickerton, reviewing The World Republic of Letters in Bookforum, observed that "Casanova's project is to retain the idea of literary autonomy yet, at the same time, to provide a political and historical grounding for it." Bickerton noted the paucity of references to literary theorists—"apart from a scattering of references to Barthes, Foucault, and Deleuze and the passage on Jameson and Said"—and speculated that this fact was explained by Casanova's background in radio journalism, not academia. Bickerton concluded: "It is refreshing that Casanova is critical of the centers' failure to enact the claims of universal value worldwide, instead often basing standards and attention on more conventional and established assumptions that are hostile to innovation of any kind—grammatical, semantic, or structural."

Bali Sahota, reviewing the book for The Bryn Mawr Review of Comparative Literature, questioned Casanova's concept of literariness, finding that it threatens to limit the definition of literature to those works enshrined by institutions: "There is no literature then (or no literature worthy of the title), Casanova seems to be suggesting, unless it is a part of, self-consciously located within, and recognized by the institutions of world literary space." Sahota argued that this concept of literariness "potentially encloses Casanova in a world of literariness that is most familiar and shuts out whatever might literarily exist autonomously of world literary space."

Boyd Tonkin, writing in The Independent, called Casanova's book "heroically ambitious" and described it as "a demanding, rewarding read." Tonkin suggested that for English-speaking readers, "much of the appeal lies in her mind-stretching ability to match familiar anecdotes of revolt or migration with linked histories from elsewhere." Tonkin summed up his assessment by saying that Casanova "draws a remarkably rich and persuasive map of global writing and publishing not as 'an enchanted world that exists outside time,' but as a battlefield on which dominant languages and cultures have always wielded the heavy weapons."

Han Au Chua, writing in Textual Practice, argues that "Casanova’s broad formulations of literary reception, translation, and structural inequalities in the world literary space are relevant – but limited – when we transpose them into the matrix of early twentieth-century China."

== Sources ==
- Anderson, Perry (September 23, 2004). "Union Sucree". London Review of Books. 26 (18): 10–16.
- Austenfeld, Thomas (Winter 2006). "Review of The World Republic of Letters". South Atlantic Review. 71 (1): 141–144.
- Bickerton, Emilie (April–May 2005). "Peripheral Vision". Bookforum: 21, 23, 56.
- Casanova, Pascale (2004). The World Republic of Letters. Cambridge: Harvard University Press. ISBN 978-0-674-01345-2.
- Chua, Han Au (January 2025). "Revisiting Pascale Casanova's world literary space". Textual Practice: 1–17. doi:10.1080/0950236X.2025.2453115.
- Deresiewicz, William (December 16, 2004). "The Literary World System". The Nation.
- Eagleton, Terry (April 11, 2005). "The Empire Writes Back". New Statesman. 18 (854): 50–51.
- Harries, Martin (November 2007). "Samuel Beckett: Anatomy of a Literary Revolution (review)". Modernism/Modernity. 14 (4): 781–783. doi:10.1353/mod.2007.0085. S2CID 145468756.
- Menand, Louis (December 26, 2005). "All That Glitters". The New Yorker. Vol. 81, no. 42. p. 136.
- Mufti, Aamir (Spring 2010). "Orientalism and the Institution of World Literatures". Critical Inquiry. 36 (3): 458–493. doi:10.1086/653408. S2CID 162345966.
- Sahota, Bali (Fall 2007). "Review of The World Republic of Letters". Bryn Mawr Review of Comparative Literature. 6 (2).
- Tonkin, Boyd (March 10, 2005). "The Quest for Literary Hegemony". The Independent.
