= Luc Jalabert =

French rejoneador

- Born: 27 August 1951; Arles, France
- Died: 27 March 2018 (aged 66); Arles, France
- Children: 3 (2 sons, 1 daughter)

Luc Jalabert (27 August 1951 – 27 March 2018) was a French rejoneador. He was the director of the Arles Amphitheatre from 1999 to 2015, and a champion of bullfighting.

== Early life ==
Jalabert was born on 27 August 1951 in Arles, France. His parents were fighting bull and thoroughbred breeders in Camargue.

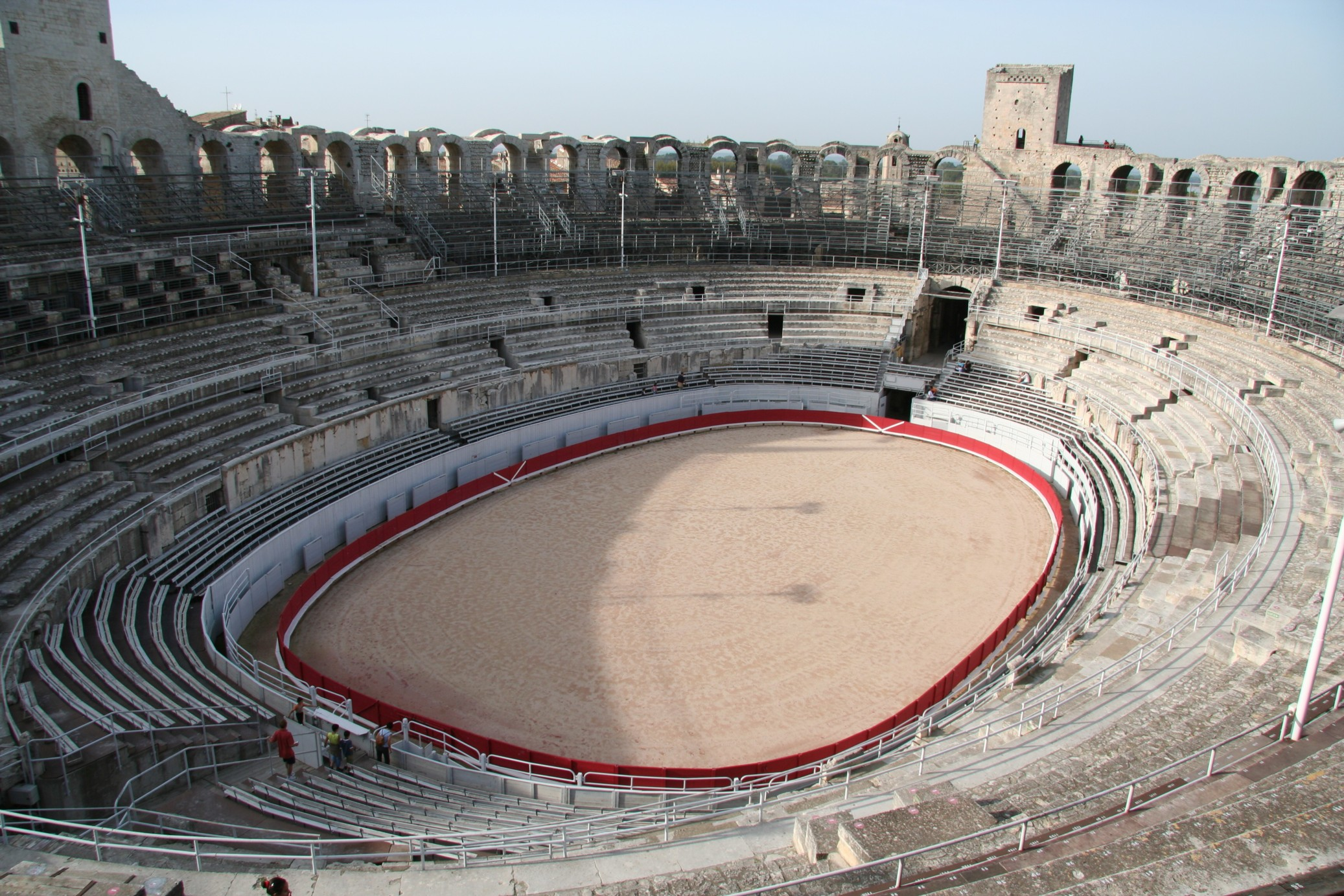
The Arles Amphitheatre

== Career ==
Jalabert began his career as a rejoneador in the Campo Pequeno bullring in Lisbon, Portugal on September 4, 1980. He competed in Portugal, Spain and France. He served as the director of the Arles Amphitheatre from 1999 to 2015. He also worked as an agent for bullfighters and event organizer.

== Personal life and death ==
Jalabert resided in La Chassagne, a mas in Arles. He had two sons and a daughter.

Jalabert died on March 27, 2018, in Arles, at the age of 66. Shortly after his death, many bullfighters and rejoneadors praised his contributions to bullfighting. His funeral was held at the Church of St. Trophime in Arles on 30 March 2018.
