= Pascale Casanova =

French literary critic (1959–2018)

- Born: February 14, 1959
- Died: September 29, 2018 (aged 59)

Academic work
- Discipline: literary criticism
- Notable works: The World Republic of Letters; Samuel Beckett: Anatomy of a Literary Revolution

Pascale Casanova (February 14, 1959 – September 29, 2018) was a French literary critic.

== Life ==
From 1997 to 2010, she was the author and editor of L'Atelier littéraire, a radio show on France Culture.

She was a visiting professor in the Department of Romance Studies at Duke University.

== Works ==
- La republique mondiale des lettres, Paris : Editions du Seuil, 1999. ISBN 9782757809983, OCLC 277230262
- Kafka en colère : essai, Paris : Seuil, DL 2011. ISBN 9782021046731, OCLC 780284447
- La langue mondiale (The World Language), Paris, Seuil, 2015

== Works in English ==
- The World Republic of Letters, translator M B DeBevoise, Cambridge, Massachusetts; London, England : Harvard University Press, 2007. ISBN 9780674010215, OCLC 959649754
- Kafka, angry poet translator Chris Turner, London; New York : Seagull Books, 2015. ISBN 9780857421623, OCLC 908326432
- Samuel Beckett: Anatomy of a Literary Revolution. ISBN 9781786635693, OCLC 1020310268
- "Literature as a World" (PDF). University of Pennsylvania. Archived from the original (PDF) on August 14, 2022.
