= Murder of Alexia Daval =

Murder in France, 2017

- Date: 27 or 28 October 2017
- Location: Gray-la-Ville, Haute-Saône, France; 47.4446°N 5.5852°E
- Convicted: Jonathan Daval
- Convictions: Murder
- Sentence: 25 years' imprisonment

On 28 October 2017, Alexia Daval (born in Fouillot; 18 February 1988 – 27 or 28 October 2017) was reported missing from her hometown of Gray-la-Ville, Haute-Saône, France, by her husband Jonathan Daval. Two days later, her body was discovered in a forest in Esmoulins. Three months later, Jonathan was arrested by the police and confessed for the murder. On 21 November 2020, he was found guilty and sentenced to 25 years in prison.

== Background ==
Alexia Fouillot was born on 18 February 1988 in Gray, Haute-Saône. She had an older sister. Her parents ran a PMU bar in Gray, a town where her mother was a municipal councilor. Fouillot graduated with a master's degree in educational sciences and became a banker. Jonathan Daval, born on 16 January 1984, grew up in Velet. He has four brothers and two sisters. His father died of a heart attack when he was young, and his mother later had a child with a construction worker. Daval and Fouillot met and began a relationship in 2004, aged 20 and 16 years old respectively. They married on 18 July 2015. The Daval couple excelled in sports and shared a common passion for running. According to the couple's friends, they seemed to love each other.

== Disappearance and death ==
On the morning of 28 October 2017, Jonathan reported Alexia missing after she had ostensibly left their marital home in Gray-la-Ville to go jogging and did not return. Her brother-in-law—Alexia's sister's husband—noticed Jonathan's behavior. The case, which echoed several murders of female joggers committed in France since the 2000s, made headlines and attracted significant media attention. It created the beginnings of panic in the region, particularly among walkers, hikers and other outdoor sports enthusiasts, many of whom were in the area where Alexia had ostensibly gone running. In addition, many local residents knew her parents, who were very involved in the life of the community. Alexia's body was discovered two days later in the Bois de la Vaivre, a forest in the nearby commune of Esmoulins. She had been beaten and strangled to death. Public prosecutor Emmanuel Dupic opened a judicial investigation for murder, entrusting the investigation to the Besançon research section. Hundreds of people took part in the various tributes paid to Alexia, in particular in November, during a "white march" organized in Gray. Alexia's relatives spoke at the end of the silent march. Her sister described Alexia as a "pretty, independent, and brilliant young woman with a strong character." Her mother prayed that Alexia was alive and would come home, while Jonathann pleaded for her safe return along with her in-laws.

== Murder investigation ==
Alexia's family defended Jonathan as the police initially suspected him but ruled him out. It was only after three months of investigation that they clearly turned their attention to him, when a witness, a neighbor of the Davals, came forward after seeing his car driving on the day Alexia disappeared. Jonathan then became the main suspect and Alexia's parents were convinced their son-in-law was an innocent man. Police uncovered an analysis of a GPS system that confirmed a trip that night, and experts discovered that the tire tracks found near the body matched those of his car. The arrest of Jonathan took place on 29 January 2018. After 30 hours of denial in police custody, Jonathann confessed to the crime in the presence of his in-laws.

Jonathan had falsely accused Alexia's brother-in-law of being her killer. The police uncovered Alexia's phone, which revealed some fairly violent text messages towards her husband. Alexia's "overwhelming" personality towards her husband became a point of the defense's argument. The suspect's defense noted that when Alexia became pregnant around the summer of 2017 and miscarried, it strained their relationship. However, her sister testified at the trial that Jonathan seemed outgoing and ignored his wife. The messages revealed toxic fights between the couple, particularly about their sex life. Their friends were shocked to hear this. Jonathan's lawyer also commented on the situation by saying Alexia was the aggressive one.

== Trial ==
The trial began on 16 November 2020 at the Assize Court of Haute-Saône and Territoire de Belfort in Vesoul. During the trial, Alexia's family and friends testified about how the couple's relationship had deteriorated. Alexia's mother confronted her son-in-law as he apologized to Alexia's family, his mother said that her son was a good person. The trial concluded on 21 November with Jonathan being found guilty of Alexia's murder. He was sentenced to 25 years in prison. The court found that Jonathan had deliberately killed Alexia and attempted to cover up his actions by initially reporting her missing and later participating in public appeals for her return.
