= Lionel Lamy =

French footballer (1943–2018)

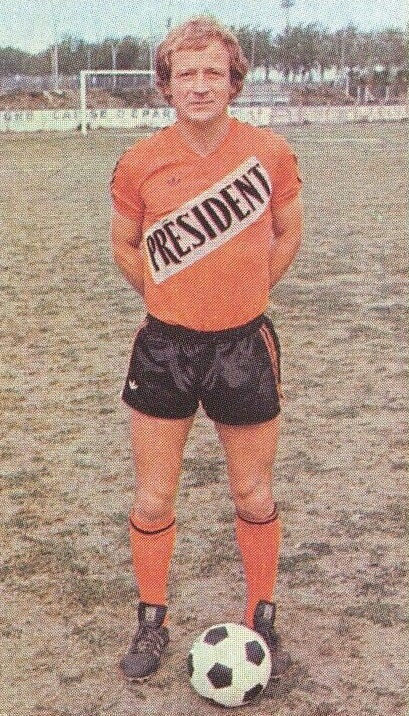
- Lamy in 1976

Personal information
- Date of birth: 29 December 1943
- Place of birth: Le Loroux-Bottereau, France
- Date of death: 4 May 2018 (aged 74)
- Height: 1.75 m (5 ft 9 in)
- Position: Defensive midfielder

Senior career*
Years	Team	Apps	(Gls)
1962–1965	Nantes	4	(0)
1965–1966	Cherbourg		
1966–1968	Le Mans		
1968–1978	Laval		
- * Club domestic league appearances and goals

Lionel Lamy (29 December 1943 – 4 May 2018) was a French professional footballer who played as a defensive midfielder for Nantes, Cherbourg, Le Mans and Laval.
