= Rosa Bouglione =

French circus performer (1910–2018)

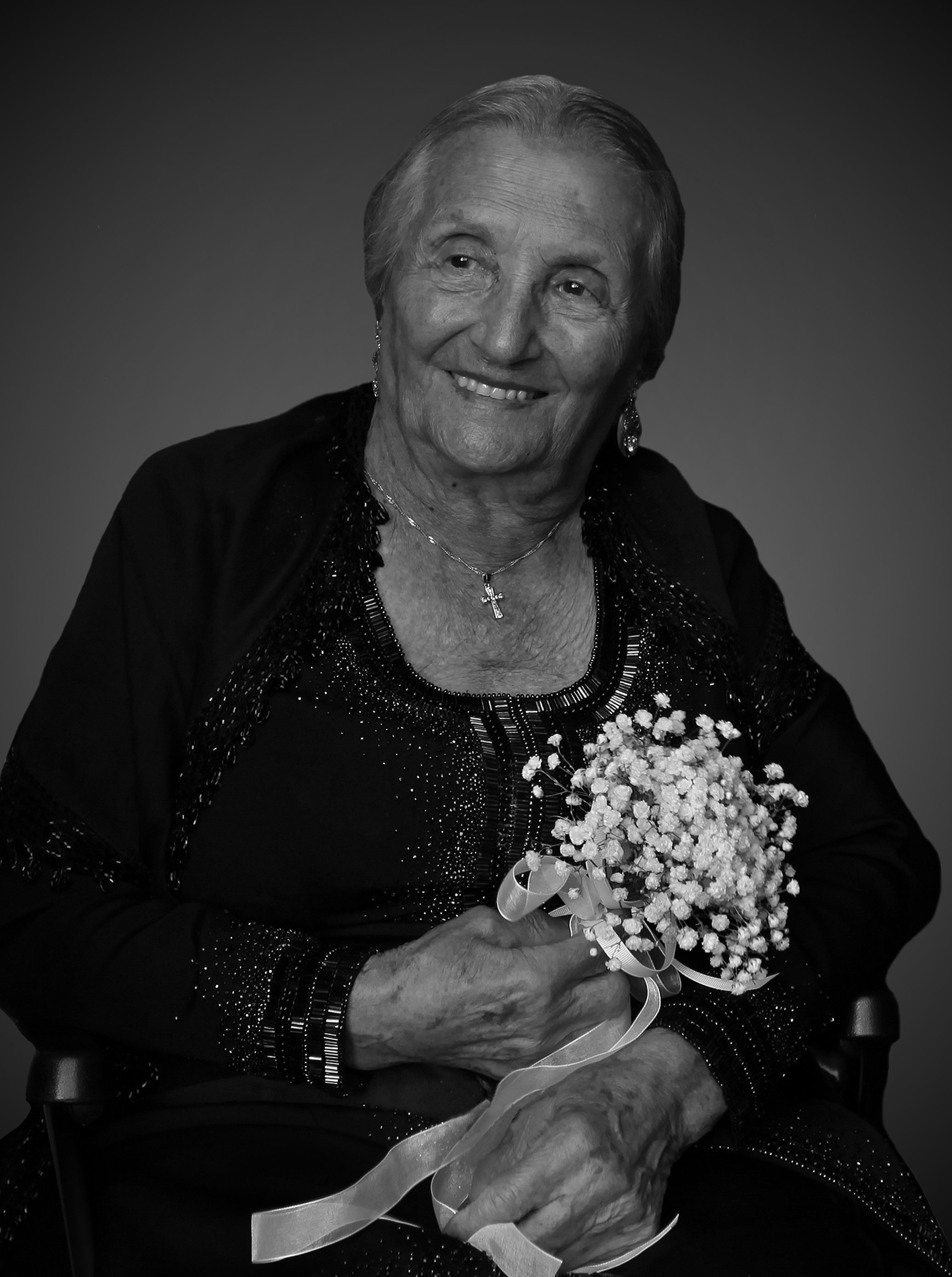
- Bouglione in 2014
- Born: Rosalie Van Been; 21 December 1910; Ixelles, Belgium
- Died: 26 August 2018 (aged 107); Paris, France
- Resting place: Lizy-sur-Ourcq, France
- Known for: Circus performer
- Spouse: Joseph Bouglione (m. 1928; died 1987)

Rosa Bouglione (née Van Been; 21 December 1910 – 26 August 2018) was a French circus performer and the matriarch of the Bouglione circus family.

== Biography ==
Rosalie Van Been was born 21 December 1910 in Ixelles, Belgium. She married Joseph Bouglione in 1928. in her teen years when she began her career in the circus, working with big cats. She was considered the French (and European) circus "Queen," and of course, she was its doyenne.

Rosa Bouglione began performing as a child and was known for her "serpentine" dance, in which she danced "à la Loie Fuller" in a cage full of lions; she married Joseph Bouglione, a cat trainer who became a legendary circus owner and director, in a lions' cage.

In 2011, she published her memoirs, Un mariage dans la cage aux lions : la grande saga du cirque Bouglione ("A wedding in the lions' cage: the great saga of the Bouglione circus").

Until the very end, "Madame Rosa," as Rosa Bouglione was known, was still active; she had seven children and 53 grandchildren and great grandchildren. She died at the age of 107 on 26 August 2018 in her apartment at the Cirque d'Hiver in Paris. Her funeral was held in the Cirque d'Hiver's ring on 29 August 2018 and she was buried in the Bouglione family's tomb at the cemetery of Lizy-sur-Ourcq, near Paris.

== Books ==
- Un mariage dans la cage aux lions. La grande saga du cirque Bouglione, by Rosa Bouglione with the collaboration of Patrick Hourdequin and José Lenzini. (2011, Michel Lafon: ISBN 9782749915258)
