= Lucien Villa =

French politician (1922–2018)

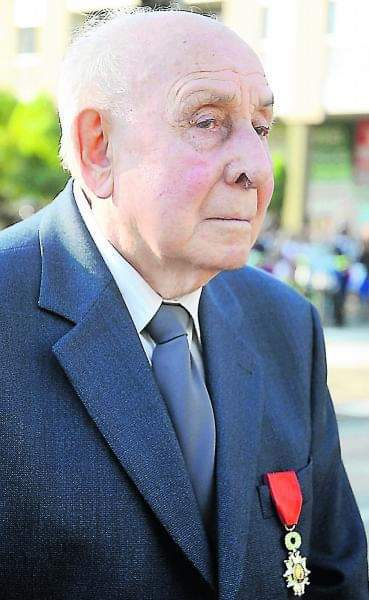
Lucien Villa

Lucien Villa (17 November 1922 – 13 May 2018) was a French politician.

== Biography ==
Villa was born in Carcassonne on 17 November 1922. As a teenager, Villa was active in the Popular Front and the French Resistance. He later joined the National Front. Villa was arrested in September 1942 and jailed for eighteen months. Soon after his release, he enlisted in the First Army. After World War II ended, Villa began working for RATP Group. He sat on the National Assembly as a member of the French Communist Party for the 31st district of Paris from 1967 to 1968, and returned to the office between 1973 and 1981.

Villa was named a chevalier of the Légion d'honneur in November 2015, and died at the age of 95 on 13 May 2018.
