= Henri Froment-Meurice =

French diplomat and author (1923–2018)

Henri Froment-Meurice (5 June 1923 – 2 July 2018) was a French diplomat and the author of several books. He served as the French Ambassador to the Soviet Union from 1979 to 1982. Later he was the French ambassador to the Federal Republic of Germany.
