= Bernard Koura =

French painter

- Born: 25 May 1923; Alençon, France
- Died: 9 February 2018 (aged 94); Vannes, France
- Education: École nationale supérieure des Beaux-Arts
- Occupation: Painter

Bernard Koura (25 May 1923 – 9 February 2018) was a French painter who was best known for his use of shades of blue. He graduated from École des Beaux-Arts in Paris, and he taught at École des Beaux-Arts in Le Mans. He painted many church frescoes, including the one in Moulins-le-Carbonnel.
