= Jean Duprat (politician, born 1936) =

French politician (1936–2018)

Jean Duprat (12 November 1936, Lannemezan – 26 April 2018) was a French politician.

He was a member of the Radical Party of the Left and began his political career as a member of the Tarbes municipal council serving from 1977 to 2001. In 1981, Duprat was named to the National Assembly in place of François Abadie. He served until 1986, and was later elected to the Barbazan-Dessus municipal council, between 2001 and 2014.
