= Michel Suffran =

French novelist (1931–2018)

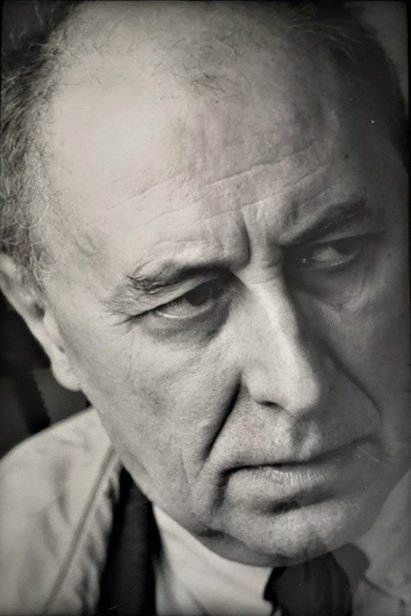
- Suffran in 1998.
- Born: 1 November 1931; Bordeaux, Gironde, France
- Died: 5 July 2018 (aged 86); Bordeaux, Gironde, France

Michel Suffran (1 November 1931 – 5 July 2018) was a French novelist (formerly a doctor). He won the Prix Durchon-Louvet from the Académie française for La nuit de Dieu in 1987.
