= Bénédicte Pesle =

French arts patron (1927–2018)

- Pesle in 2015
- Born: Bénédicte Germaine Marie Pesle; 15 May 1927. Le Havre, France
- Died: 17 January 2018 (aged 90); Paris, France
- Known for: arts patronage
- Awards: Légion d'honneur; Ordre des Arts et des Lettres

Bénédicte Pesle (15 May 1927 – 17 January 2018) was a French arts patron. She was known for having introduced American avant-garde artists of stage, music, dance, and the visual arts to France, and was instrumental in the European careers Merce Cunningham, Robert Wilson, Philip Glass, and Trisha Brown, amongst others.

In the announcement of her Ordre des Arts et des Lettres award, she was listed as an "agent artistique" (artistic agent), but in the course of her career, carried out largely behind the scenes, she was also sometimes described as a "producer" or "presenter". A 1985 article about her in the Christian Science Monitor, described her less formally as "a combination of friend, agent, impresario, producer, fund-raiser, and creative adviser." She herself preferred the term "secrétaire d’artistes" (secretary to artists) to describe her work.

== Life and career ==
Pesle was born in Le Havre, one of the eleven children of Robert Pesle and Marguerite née de Menil. Her father was a businessman active in the import of wood from France's African colonies. Her mother was the sister of the philanthropist and art patron John de Menil. After completing her studies at the Sorbonne in 1950, she worked at a municipal library in Paris and at the bookstore-gallery La Hune, a gathering place for Parisian intellectuals. She received a study grant in 1952 which allowed her to spend two years in the United States where she worked in a Boston bookstore.

It was during this initial visit to the United States that Pesle saw the New York debut of the Merce Cunningham Company in 1953. At the time Cunningham was working with the composer John Cage and several avant-garde artists such as Jasper Johns and Robert Rauschenberg, all of whom Pesle came to know. She was quoted in 1985 as saying "When I came back to France I wanted everyone to know them." On her return to France, she continued her work at La Hune until 1960 and began promoting Cunningham's work, at first working only with a close circle of friends and art patrons. She then became a director of the Paris branch of the Alexander Iolas galleries. She worked there for the next eleven years, especially with the artists Max Ernst, René Magritte and Niki de Saint-Phalle, and often made selections of paintings, sculptures, and drawings for important collections, including that of John and Dominique De Menil.

From her office in the Iolas gallery Pesle also worked to promote performances by Cunningham and artists associated with his company. She was instrumental in organizing the first European tour of his dance company and its Paris debut at the Théâtre de l'Est parisien in 1964. The performance was a controversial one, with some members of the audience throwing tomatoes at the troupe. Undeterred, Pesle said from the wings, "On continue, let's prepare the next one". In 1966, towards the end of the company's tour, Pesle arranged for them all to stay at John de Menil's chateau in Pontpoint. It was there that Gordon Mumma who was working with the company at the time, began composing his piece Pontpoint which he dedicated to Pesle. In the early years of Cunningham's appearances in France, filling the theatres was often a problem. With Niki de Saint-Phalle, Jacqueline Matisse Monnier, and three other friends, Pesle established the French Friends of Merce Cunningham. Each of them undertook to bring at least 10 people to his performances and to convince each of those to bring ten people as well, Self-described as Cunningham's "pilot fish", Pesle remained the dancer's European agent until his death in 2009.

In 1971 Pesle formed the New York-based Performing ArtService (which later became ArtService International) and Modus Vivendi, a foundation to support American artists coming to France. In 1972, she opened her own office in Paris from which she ran ArtService International as a nonprofit organization. During that time she began her long association with Michel Guy, a prominent figure in French cultural life and the Minister of Culture from 1974 to 1976. In 1972 she helped him found the Festival d'automne à Paris, an annual multidisciplinary showcase for the contemporary arts. Both Robert Wilson and Merce Cunningham appeared in the first festival and continued to appear there throughout their careers, often in the world premieres of their works, including Cunningham's Loose Strife and Robert Wilson's Overture. During Guy's tenure as Minister of Culture, Pesle also convinced him to commission Philip Glass and Robert Wilson's opera Einstein on the Beach which had its world premiere at the Festival d'Avignon in 1976 and toured to Hamburg, Paris, Belgrade, Venice, Brussels and Rotterdam later that summer.

Pesle worked as Robert Wilson's representative in Europe up until her final days. When her death in Paris on 17 January 2018 was announced, Wilson wrote:

Of all the people that I have worked with, throughout my life, both professionally and otherwise, there is one person who always stood out. Her name is Benedicte Pesle; she was a visionary, she was capable of envisioning large-scale works and thinking over long periods of time. She had the best critical eye I ever met. She was severe in her dress and taste. She had a great sense of humor. She alone was more responsible than anyone else in bringing American artists to Europe and elsewhere.

Her funeral was held on 24 January 2018 at the Église Notre-Dame-des-Champs in Paris and her ashes interred in the family tomb at the Montparnasse Cemetery. Pesle's life companion, the journalist Arlette Marchal, predeceased her as did most of her siblings, including her brother Etienne Pesle, a social activist and former Catholic priest who disappeared in Chile in 1973 and is presumed to have been killed by the Pinochet regime.

Pesle was made a Chevalier of the Légion d'honneur in 2006 and a Commandeur of the Ordre des Arts et des Lettres in 2013. The main archive of her papers is held at the Institut mémoires de l'édition contemporaine in Caen and includes a detailed documentation of her work with Merce Cunningham from the beginning of their collaboration in the early 1960s until his death in 2009.
