= Gerald Messadié =

French journalist and author (1931-2018)

- Born: 1931; Cairo, Egypt
- Died: 5 July 2018 (aged 86–87)
- Citizenship: French
- Known for: Scientific journalism, history, essays and novels

Gerald Messadié (1931 – 5 July 2018) was a French scientific journalist, essayist and novelist. His work comprised historical novels, biographies, essays on the history of religions, and some science fiction work where esoterism takes a large place.

== Biography ==
Gerald Messadié was an editor of science magazine Science & Vie, for 25 years, and has published over 60 books on various themes. Interested in history, ethnology and theology, he published essays on beliefs, cultures and religions, biographies (including a two-volume biography of Moses) and historical novels, such as Marie-Antoinette – La rose écrasée (Marie-Antoinette: The Crushed Rose, 2006), aimed at rehabilitating the queen, whom he considered slandered and misrepresented.

== Publications ==
- Un personnage sans couronne, (roman), Plon 1955
- Les princes, (roman), Plon 1957
- Le chien de francfort, (roman), Plon 1961
- Le zodiaque à 24 signes, Stock 1973
- Bouillon de culture, Robert Laffont 1973 (en collaboration avec Bruno Lussato)
- Mahomet, (religion), 1974
- L’alimentation suicide. (Les dangers réels et imaginaires des produits chimiques dans notre alimentation.) Fayard 1973
- La messe de saint Picasso, (essai), Robert Laffont 1984
- Les grandes découvertes de la science, (histoire), Bordas 1987
- Les grandes inventions de l’humanité jusqu’en 1850, (histoire), Bordas 1988
- Requiem pour Superman, la crise du mythe américain, (essai), Robert Laffont 1988
- Suite romanesque: L'Homme qui devint Dieu
  - Tome 1 : Le récit, Robert Laffont, 1988 (Réédition : 887 pp., LGF - Livre de Poche, N° 6777, 1990 — ISBN 2-253-05329-5)
  - Tome 2 : Les sources, Robert Laffont, 1989 (2^{e} édition : 1999 — ISBN 2-221-08222-2)
  - Tome 3 : L'incendiaire, vie de Saul, apôtre, Robert Laffont, 1991 — ISBN 2-221-08223-0
  - Tome 4 : Jésus de Srinagar, Robert Laffont, 1995 (Réédition : 527 pp., LGF - Livre de Poche, 1997 — ISBN 2-253-14353-7) "roman foisonnant de personnages et de péripéties"
- Les grandes inventions du monde moderne, (histoire), Bordas 1989
- Matthias et le diable, (roman), Robert Laffont 1990
- Le chant des poissons-lunes, (roman), Robert Laffont 1992
- Ma vie amoureuse et criminelle avec Martin Heidegger, (roman), Robert Laffont 1992
- Histoire générale du diable, (religion), Robert Laffont 1993
- Coup de gueule contre les gens qui se croient de droite et quelques autres qui se croient de gauche, (nouvelle), Ramsay 1995
- 29 jours avant la fin du monde, (roman), Robert Laffont 1995
- La fortune d'Alexandrie, (roman), Lattès 1996
- Tycho l’admirable, (roman), Julliard 1996
- Une histoire générale de Dieu (essai), Robert Laffont, 1997 — ISBN 2-221-07988-4
- Suite: Moïse, (biographie),
  - Tome 1 : Un prince sans couronne, 320 pp., Lattès, 1998 — ISBN 2-7096-1876-1
  - Tome 2 : Le prophète fondateur, 373 pp., Lattès, 1998 — ISBN 2-7096-1894-X
- Histoire générale de l'antisémitisme (essai), 431 pp., Lattès, 1999 — ISBN 2-7096-1926-1
- David roi (roman), 380 pp., Lattès, 1999 — ISBN 2-7096-1949-0
- Balzac, une conscience insurgée,écrit avec Jean-Charles Gérard, (essai), Edition N°1 1999
- Mon petit livre des prières, (religion), Presses du Châtelet 2000
- Madame Socrate, (roman policier), Lattès 2000 (Réédition : LGF - Livre de Poche, N° 15354, 2002 — ISBN 2-253-15354-0)
- Les Cinq livres secrets dans la Bible (essai), 689 pp., Lattès, 2001 — ISBN 2-7096-2141-X
- 25, rue Soliman Pacha (roman), Lattès 2001 - 474 pp., Collection Ldp, N° 5554, LGF - Livre de Poche, 2003 — ISBN 2-253-15554-3
- Le mauvais esprit, (essai), Max Milo 2001
- Mourir pour New York, (essai), Max Milo, 2002
- L'Affaire Marie Madeleine (document), Lattés, 2002 (Réédition : LGF - Livre de Poche, N° 30187, 2004 — ISBN 2-253-10992-4)
- Le tourisme va mal, achevons-le ! (essai), 2003
- Suite romanesque: Jeanne de l'Estoille
  - Tome 1: La Rose et le lys, L'Archipel, 2003 — ISBN 2-84187-810-4
  - Tome 2: Le Jugement des loups, L'Archipel, 2003 — ISBN 2-84187-811-2
  - Tome 3: La Fleur d'Amérique, L'Archipel, 2003 — ISBN 2-84187-812-0
- Trois mille lunes, (roman), Laffont, 2003
- Suite romanesque: Orages sur le Nil
  - Tome I : L'oeil de Néfertiti, L’Archipel 2004
  - Tome II : Les masques de Toutankhamon, L’Archipel 2004
  - Tome III : Le triomphe de Seth, L’Archipel 2004
- Et si c'était lui (roman), 350 pp., L'Archipel, 2004 — ISBN 2-84187-618-7
- Suite: Saint Germain l'homme qui ne voulait pas mourir
  - Tome I : Le masque venu de nulle part, (ou "Un masque nommé Saint Germain"), L’Archipel, 2005
  - Tome II : Les puissances de l'invisible, L’Archipel, 2005 - ISBN 2-84187-748-5
- Cargo, la religion des humiliés du Pacifique (essai), Calmann-Levy, 2005, ISBN 2-7021-3598-6
- Marie-Antoinette — La rose écrasée (roman), L'Archipel, 2006 — ISBN 2-84187-832-5
- Quarante siècles d'ésotérisme (essai), Presses du Chatelet, 2006, ISBN 2-84592-207-8
- Judas, le bien-aimé, Lattès 2007
- Suite: Jacob
  - Tome I : Le gué de Yabboq, L’Archipel, 2007
  - Tome II : Le roi sans couronne, L’Archipel, 2007
- Saladin, chevalier de l’islam, (document), L’Archipel, 2008
- Padre Pio ou les prodiges du mysticisme, (religion), Presses du Châtelet 2008
- Jurassic France : pourquoi nous sommes en voie de fossilisation, L'Archipel, 2009
- Un espoir aussi fort
  - Tome I : Les années de fer, L’Archipel, 2009
  - Tome II : Les années d'argent, L’Archipel, 2009
  - Tome III : Les années d'or, L’Archipel, 2009
- Le Krach du sperme, avec Pierre Duterte, L’Archipel, 2009
- Ramsès II l’immortel
  - Tome I : Le Diable flamboyant, L’Archipel, 2010
  - Tome II : Le Roi des millions d’années, L’Archipel, 2010
