= Marcel Frémiot =

French composer and musicologist (1920–2018)

- Born: February 29, 1920; 8th arrondissement of Paris, France
- Died: January 19, 2018 (aged 97)
- Education: Conservatoire de Paris
- Occupations: Composer, musicologist
- Organizations: Groupe de musique expérimentale de Marseille (GMEM), Laboratoire Musique et informatique de Marseille (MIM)
- Known for: Founding electroacoustic music class in Marseille, contributions to musical semiotics
- Notable work: Electroacoustic compositions, musicological analyses

Marcel Frémiot (29 February 1920 – 19 January 2018) was a French composer and musicologist.

== Biography ==
Born in the 8th arrondissement of Paris, Frémiot was a student at the Conservatoire de Paris and a pupil of René Leibowitz. He was introduced to musicology by Vladimir Fedoroff.

He was artistic director or sound recordist in several record companies (Le Chant du Monde, Harmonia Mundi, disques Jéricho). From 1966, he was a professor of music history at the Marseille conservatory. In 1967–1968, he was a trainee of the Groupe de recherches musicales (GRM) under the direction of Pierre Schaeffer.

In 1968, he was the professor of the first class of electroacoustic music at the Marseille conservatory, created on the initiative of its director Pierre Barbizet. In 1970, he founded the "Groupe de musique expérimentale de Marseille" (GMEM). In 1984, he created the Laboratoire Musique et informatique de Marseille (MIM).

== Selected works ==
Frémiot wrote about 120 works of instrumental music, electroacoustic, vocal, choral, incidental music or film.

He wrote numerous articles in the Encyclopédie de la Musique (Fasquelle), Twenty Century Music (Calder Publishing, London), the Histoire de la musique (La Pléiade), the Encyclopédie des musiques sacrées (éditions Labergerie), Die Musik in Geschichte und Gegenwart, The New Grove Dictionary of Music and Musicians.

He is the author of numerous analyses of works and participated in the following collective works:

- Les Unités sémiotiques temporelles (UST), éléments nouveaux d'analyse musicale (MIM éditeur, 1996)
- Ouïr, entendre, écouter, comprendre après Schaeffer (dir. François Delalande, Buchet/Chastel, 1999)
- Les Unités sémiotiques temporelles (UST), nouvelles clés pour l'écoute, outil d'analyse musicale (MIM éditeur, 2003)
