= Firmin Le Bourhis =

French writer (1950–2018)

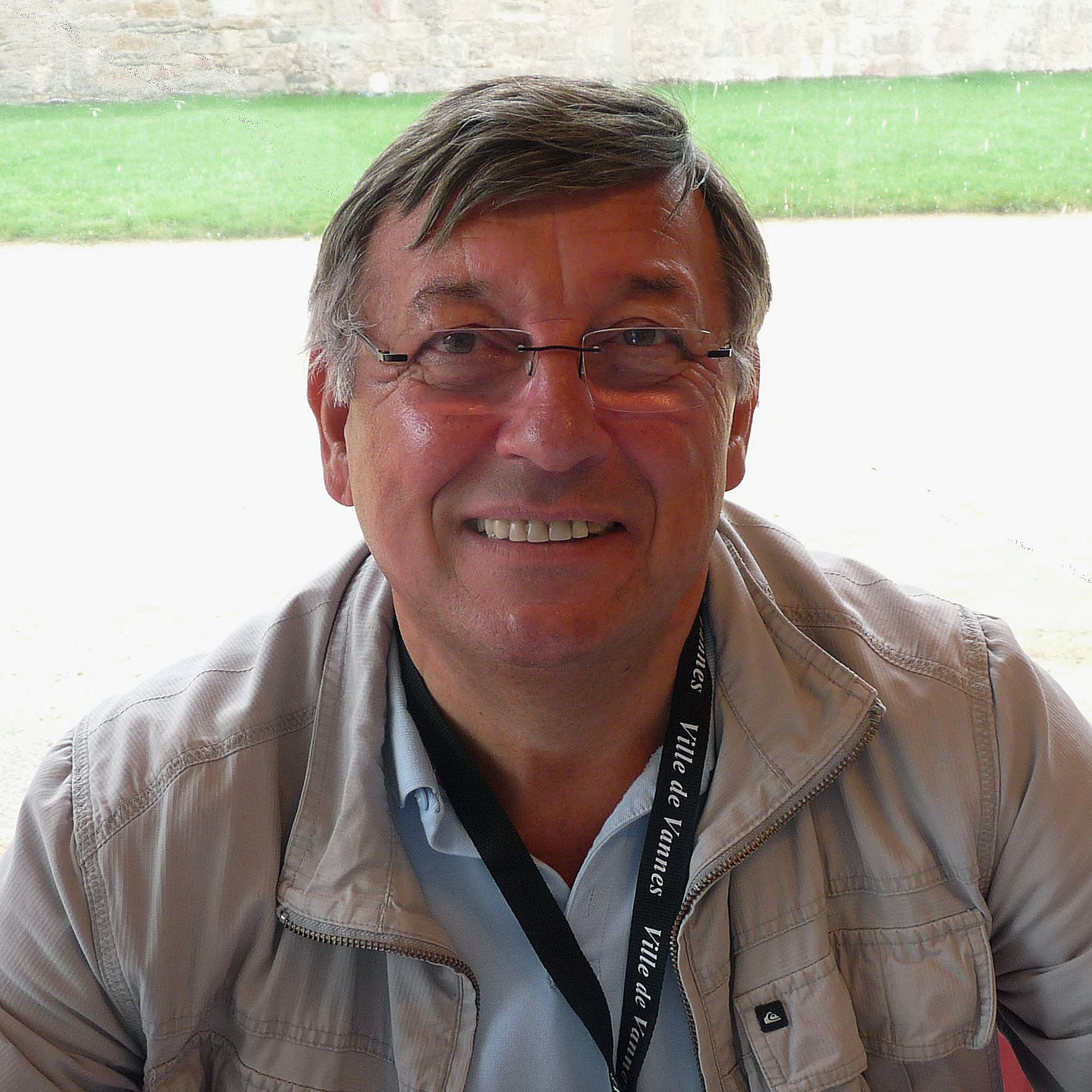
- Le Bourhis in 2012
- Born: 18 May 1950; Kernével, Finistère, France
- Died: 21 April 2018 (aged 67); Châteauroux, France
- Occupation: Detective novelist

Firmin Le Bourhis (18 May 1950 – 21 April 2018) was a French detective writer. He authored 32 detective novels over the course of 18 years. He died of a heart attack on his way to the Envolée des livres, a book festival in Châteauroux.
