= Jean-Claude Decagny =

French politician

Jean-Claude Decagny (10 June 1939 – 6 May 2018) was a French politician who was an MP from 1993 to 2010. He also served as Mayor of Maubeuge from 1984 to 1989 and from 1995 to 2001.
