= Daniel S. Milo =

Israeli-French philosopher and writer

- דניאל שבתאי מילוא
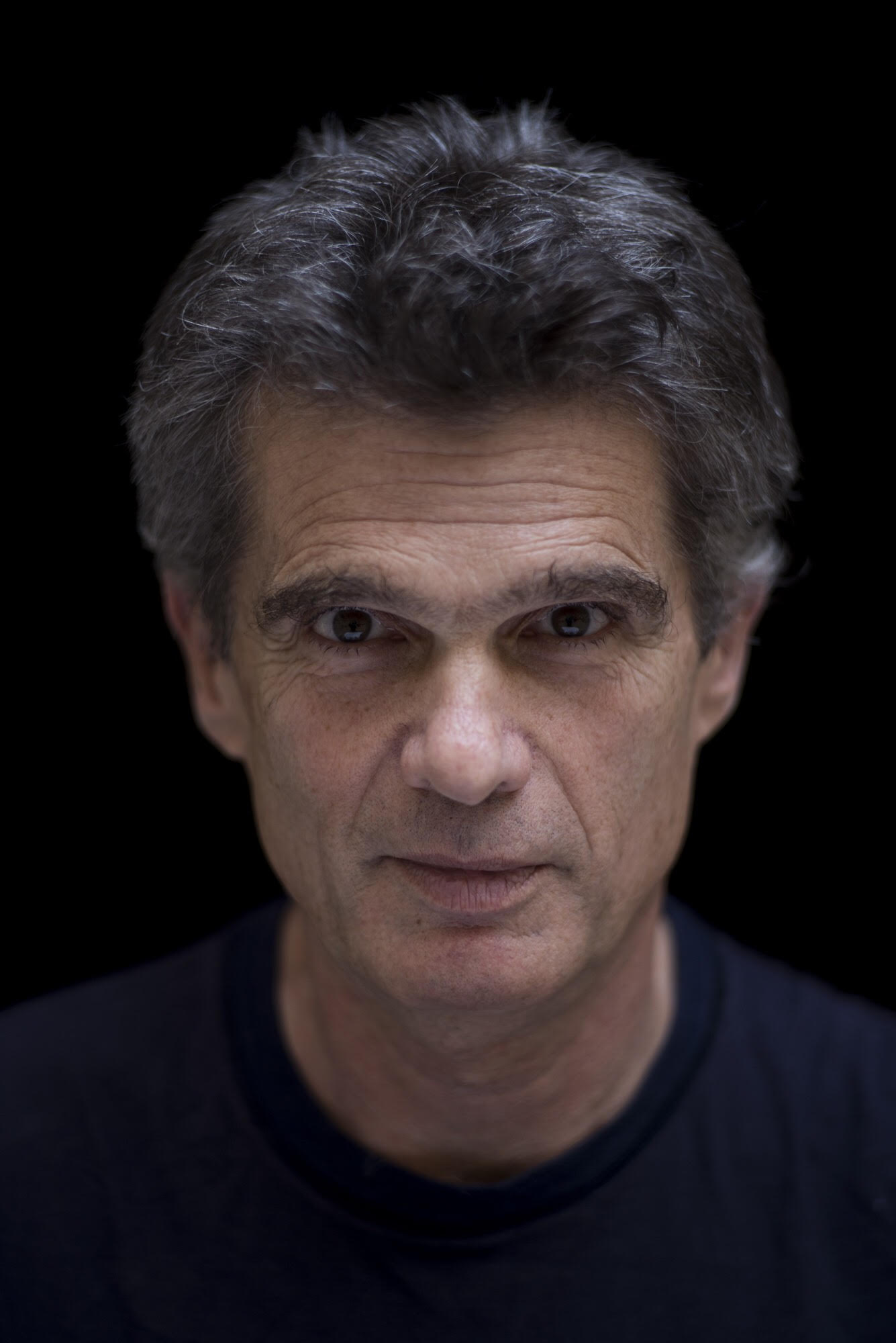
- Born: Daniel Milwitzky; August 21, 1953 (age 73); Tel Aviv, Israel
- Years active: 1985–present

Academic background
- Education: Tel Aviv University (1980)
- Alma mater: School for Advanced Studies in the Social Sciences
- Thesis: Survival in Culture

Daniel Shabetai Milo (Hebrew: דניאל שבתאי מילוא; born 21 August 1953 as Daniel Milwitzky) is an Israeli-French philosopher and writer. Milo is a professor of natural philosophy at the École des Hautes Études en Sciences Sociales (EHESS), Paris. He is the author of nine books, eight published by Les Belles Lettres in Paris and one at Harvard University Press, and has written thirty-five articles and book chapters; his work was translated into nine languages. He directed three short films and several theatrical productions. The leitmotiv of his scientific and artistic work is excess. His ambition is to revive natural philosophy, the precursor of modern science during the centuries between Aristotle and Darwin.

== Biography ==
Daniel S. Milo was born in Tel Aviv, Israel in 1953. His father, Yossef Milo (Milwitsky), was born in Berlin and his mother, Bruria Milo (née Weitzen), was from Poland. He obtained B.A. and M.A. degrees in philosophy, comparative literature, and film studies at the University of Tel Aviv, completing his master's thesis in 1980. After moving to Paris in 1982, Milo wrote a Ph.D. dissertation in cultural studies at the École des Hautes Études en Sciences Sociales (EHESS) and was subsequently elected professor at the same institution.

== Work ==
=== Cultural Studies and the Quantitative Method ===
Milo's Ph.D. dissertation, "Survival in Culture," was his research into excess and his first encounter with Darwinism. There are too candidates to the cultural pantheon. The struggle for life in collective memory is Malthusian. He treated posterity as the cultural equivalent of natural selection. Milo was a pioneer in applying quantitative tools to the cultural canon. He assessed the posthumous life of an artist or a work by counting its presence in textbooks, translations, museums, encyclopedias, theatrical repertoires, etc. He was the first to study translations and street names as historical and cultural markers. Two of the chapters of the dissertation were published in the Lieux de mémoire (Sites of Memory) and one in the Annales HSS.

=== Historiography: The Question of Periodization ===
The next phase in Milo's research was questioning periodization, the division of the past into distinct parts, in Trahir le temps (histoire) [Betraying Time (History)]. This project began with a thought experiment: What if we began to reckon time, not from the crucifixion of Christ (1 AD) but from his Passion (33 AD)? All dates would then be thrown off by 33 years, the first third of each century thus going to the century before. This game of historical fiction allows us to problematize the arbitrary notion of "century." Milo then questioned other divisions of the past, with recurrent emphasis on their artificiality; hence, the metaphor of "gerrymandering time." The title of the book plays on the two meanings of the French verb "trahir," to betray and to reveal. In order to study the past one needs to betray it, and the most traitorous tool is periodization because arbitrary periods suggest the existence of realities that do not truly exist. Among these divisions, he studied the notion of generation and the invention of the split BC (before Christ)/AD (Anno Domini), which is a division that is totally irrelevant to practically all historical phenomena. In a study on the so-called terrors of the Year 1000 he showed that this collective psychosis could not have existed because 99% of the medieval population ignored the date of the year in which they lived. He then showed that the birth of the myth was coupled with the invention of the division of time into periods of 100 years; the century was invented around 1600 and became standard around 1800. "Milo won acclaim by his intriguing study Trahir le temps in which he deconstructed our periodization of history time by means of experimental models."

=== Experimental History ===
Betraying reality in order to reveal it is at the basis of the experimental method. Milo wrote a manifesto, "Pour une histoire expérimentale ou La gaie science" (Toward an Experimental History or The Gay Science) that was translated into German (twice), English, and Russian. Following Claude Bernard's Introduction to the Study of Experimental Medicine (1865), Milo enumerated several archetypal experimental methods: graft, ablation, injection, transfer, change of scale, and collage. He gathered a group of historians willing to play with the past. The results were published in Alter histoire: Essais d'histoire expérimentale (Alter History: Essays in Experimental History, 1991). Alter Histoire provoked bitter controversy but ended reaching the status of a classic: "this was the most radical and also the most interesting plan for renovating history in France in the 1990s. What is more, the plan was carried out."

=== Experimental Philosophy ===
Most questions about human affairs are not testable because of the constraints on human subject research. So Milo sought willing subjects in literature. In the 1990s, he studied in Héros & Cobayes (Heroes & Guinea Pigs, 1997), fictional situations as laboratories and fictional personae as guinea pigs. Milo read the story of the Garden of Eden as a laboratory in cognitive science. God puts Adam in front of two trees: the tree of life and the tree of knowledge. Strangely, He forbids Adam from eating from the latter but says nothing about the former. As a result, the guinea pig is obsessed by the prohibited fruit and is indifferent to that which was permitted.

=== Philosophy: Objectivity and Narcissus ===
Milo deals with the subject of philosophical relativism in Pour Narcisse: Essai de l'amour impartial (For Narcissus: Essay in Impartial Love, 1995); the book was translated into Polish. A literal reading of the story of Narcissus by Milo reveals, first, that Narcissus doesn't fall in love with himself but with a reflection on the water that he does not recognize as his own. Second, his love is far from being subjective. Narcissus is perfection incarnate; that's why all the characters in the story, humans and nymphs, fall in love with him. Most philosophers and scientists would agree the morality of the fable: objectivity is rare; it is dangerous; but it exists.

=== Ethics: Clefs (Keys) ===
In Clefs (1993), also published into Spanish, Milo reads verbal noises: stereotypes, platitudes, clichés, tropisms, truisms—as philosophical theses. The first section, "Phrases", is made of 222 sentences such as "Even a Kafka was Kafka only two hours per day" and "Underwater, all icebergs are wet." The second section, "Standards," offers a series of jam sessions on commonplaces and maxims such as "Don't talk about rope in a hanged man's house,” and "It's not so simple." In the third section, "Locks," Milo suggests that the three metaphors we live by are Épicerie (grocer's shop), Paranoia, and Iceberg (EPI). In the grocer's shop there is no such thing as a free lunch. For the paranoiac everything has meaning. In the iceberg the meaning is between the lines. The grocer cannot admit unilateral actions. For the paranoiac nothing is neutral. And the enemy of the interpreter is literality. Simplicity is the unthinkable of the three.

=== Natural Philosophy: Future and Excess ===
Dealing with the idea of excess led Milo to natural philosophy. In The Invention of Tomorrow (2009) he wondered about the origin and sustainability of human excesses. Man is exaggeration personified, and his hyperbolic character is expressed principally in the size of his brain and the size of his population. Milo argues that the two were not coupled in the past. Until the exodus out of Africa, some 60,000 years ago, our ancestors' brains were as big as ours, but humanity counted around 20,000 (twenty thousand!) people. Then, as if by miracle, the wheel of fortune turned in their favor. Several hundred members of our species left Africa and within twenty thousand years, humans reached Australia. The geographical expansion went hand in hand with a demographic explosion. From twenty thousand they became twenty million, then two hundred million, then eight billion. What was it that led Homo sapiens to leave home after home, asks Milo, and argues that it was the invention of a new tense: the future. The future created the faculty to project oneself into a nonexistent time, to make plans concerning this nothingness, and to share these plans with one's peers. This is the source of Excess. Written in Hebrew, The Invention of the Future was a best-seller in Israel and was well covered by the Israeli media. The French translation was hailed as "mind-boggling and unexpected." The book was also translated into Korean.

=== Natural Philosophy: Excess as a Characteristic of Life ===
After exploring human excess in The Invention of the Future, Milo's research led him to nature, particularly to evolution. His book from 2019, Good Enough: The Tolerance for Mediocrity in Nature and Society, shows that excess, redundancy, nonsense, noise, uselessness, futility, and inefficiency are ubiquitous at all levels of life, from the molecular to the behavioral. The only difference between the two types of excesses: Man produces its excess whereas other organisms inherit it.

== Books ==
- 1985: Aspects de la survie culturelle, Ph.D. Dissertation, Paris, EHESS
- 1991: Trahir le temps (histoire), Paris, Les Belles Lettres
- 1991: Alter Histoire. Essais d'histoire expérimentale (with Alain Boureau and al.,), Paris, Les Belles Lettres
- 1993: Clefs, Paris, Les Belles Lettres, 1993 (Spanish translation: Llaves, by Rolando Pratz-Paez, 2005, Miami: Ediciones Catalejo)
- 1995: Pour Narcisse: Essai de l'amour impartial, Paris, Les Belles Lettres (Polish translation: Pochwała Narcyza. O miłości bezstronnej, 2006, by Agata Gołębiewska, Jaworski, Warsaw)
- 1997: Héros & Cobayes, Paris, Les Belles Lettres
- 2002: La dernière mort de Socrate, Paris, Les Belles Lettres
- 2004: Les Porteurs de cerveau, Paris, Les Belles Lettres
- 2009: Hamzaat Ha'Machar (in Hebrew: The Invention of Tomorrow), Tel Aviv, Ha-Kibbutz Ha-Mehuchad (French translation L'Invention de demain, 2011, Paris, Les Belles Lettres; Korean translation, 미 래 중 독 _{자오늘을 버리고 내일만 사는 별종, 사피엔스} 2017)
- 2019: Good Enough: The Tolerance for Mediocrity in Nature and Society, Cambridge MA, Harvard University Press
- 2024: La survie des médiocres. Critique du darwinisme et du capitalisme, Paris, Collection Bibliothèque des Sciences humaines, Gallimard
