= Madeleine Kamman =

French chef (1930–2018)

Madeleine Kamman (22 November 1930 – 16 July 2018) was a French chef and restaurateur, cookery teacher and author of seven cookbooks, who spent most of her working life in America bringing the rigors of French technique to American ingredients and audiences.

== Family ==
Born Madeleine Marguerite Pin in Courbevoie, France, she was the daughter of Charles Pin and his wife Simone, née Labarriere. She studied at the Sorbonne and Le Cordon Bleu in Paris. In 1960, she married Alan Kamman, a civil engineer, and moved to America. The couple had two sons. Kamman suffered from Alzheimer's disease in her last years and died in Middlebury, Vermont, at the age of 87.

== Recognition ==
Kamman has been recognized by chefs including James Beard for her discerning palate and knowledge of the history, culture, and science of food, as well as her passion for celebrating the food cooked by women in the home as much as the masters of haute cuisine. She has been celebrated as a leader of what she called "cuisine personelle"—part of the nouvelle cuisine movement that reinvented the classics of French classical cuisine. She is also commended for her teaching skills, and has influenced the development of many American chefs.

Kamman first learned to cook as a young girl at her aunt's Michelin-starred restaurant in Touraine, France.' She returned to Paris at the end of the World War 2 with the hope of attending university, but finances required her to work. She later attended Le Cordon Bleu in Paris, and met, in 1959, the American Alan Kamman. They married and moved to Philadelphia, but, by her own admission, she did not easily adjust to life in the United States, in part because she found American cooking and ingredients in the early 1960s inferior to those of her native France. She suffered from depression, but used cooking as an antidote, and started giving cooking classes in 1966. In 1968, she moved to the Boston area and thereafter opened a cooking school, The Modern Gourmet, with a restaurant, Chez La Mère Madeleine, staffed by students from the cooking school.

Kamman's time in Boston triggered a notorious feud between Kamman and Julia Child, in which Kamman challenged Child's claims of being a "French chef". Kamman pointed out that Child was neither French nor a 'chef', but was an American cooking teacher instead. According to Kamman, "[w]hen you try to teach a cuisine that is not your own, there is always one dimension missing." Many have attributed Kamman's critique to professional jealousy based on Child's immense popularity with American audiences and the success of her "French chef" brand. Child returned the animosity, refusing to speak Kamman's name publicly and instead called her "that woman". Child refused to dine at Chez La Mère Madeleine, although the restaurant received five stars from The Boston Globe, four stars from the Mobil Guide, and accolades from French chef Paul Bocuse.

Kamman closed Chez La Mère Madeleine and the Modern Gourmet cooking school in 1980 to return to France, where she launched a cooking school in Annecy. Her time in France was brief: France's high taxes and what she saw as rampant sexism in France's professional kitchens led her to return to the United States, where she first opened Auberge Madeleine, a restaurant and cooking school in Glen, a village of Bartlett, New Hampshire. A diagnosis of heart disease caused her to close the restaurant, and she moved to the Napa Valley in the late 1980s, where she opened the School for American Chefs at Beringer Vineyards, a highly competitive two-week training session for professional chefs. In addition to cooking classes, chef-students were given lessons in kitchen chemistry and science, culinary history, geology, and geography to increase their appreciation of menu planning and terroir. Kamman retired to Vermont in 2000 to pursue a graduate degree in German literature at the University of Vermont with Professor David Scrase.

In addition to her teaching and writing, Kamman created Madeleine Cooks, a PBS cooking show that ran from 1984 to 1991. She received an honorary doctorate from Johnson and Wales University, A Lifetime Achievement Award from the International Association of Culinary Professionals, and a knighthood in the Ordres des Arts et des Lettres from the French Ministry of Culture, among other awards.

== Feminism ==
Kamman's career was informed by her passion for the cooking done by French women in the home, and the desire to see this authentic cuisine de terroir, cuisine des femmes, cuisine du coeur, recognised within a culture and cooking establishment that privileged the artistry of professional, and mostly male, chefs. Indeed, she accused chefs like Paul Bocuse of appropriating the cooking of their mothers and grandmothers and presenting it as their own.

Her own learning was inspired in childhood by her mother, aunts and great-aunts, whose cooking represented many regions of France. She dedicated her third book, When French Women Cook (Athenaeum, 1976), to writing down their recipes, most recorded for the first time, in an attempt to preserve a record of a France long since gone, and also determined to "bring back to life" the "women with worn hands stained by vegetables peeled, parched by work in the house, garden or fields, wrinkled by age and experience", so her readers will know "that there was once a civilisation that was human, tender, enjoyable and loveable." Her dedication reads "This book, in its own way a feminist manifesto, is dedicated to the millions of women who have spent millennia in kitchens creating unrecognised masterpieces".

At a time when early feminist politics were challenging entrenched gender roles, including women's identification with the labour of the kitchen, Kamman was celebrating women's cooking in an attempt to preserve the standards of a rich and varied culinary tradition, and to elevate the status of such work as performed by women in the home. As a professional chef and restaurateur, she also argued for the status of women in the professional kitchen: "I took a stand", she says, "on women in the professional kitchen before Women's Lib came into the picture ... I had transcended the limits imposed on women by generations of professional chefs and found myself succeeding in a so-called male profession." She believed by the 1990s that the next generation would see as many women as men reaching the top.

== Bibliography ==
- The Making of a Cook (1971)
- Dinner Against the Clock (1973)
- When French Women Cook (1976)
- In Madeleine's Kitchen (1984)
- Madeleine Cooks (1986)
- Madeleine Kamman's Savoie: The Land, People, and Food of the French Alps (1989)
- The New Making of a Cook (1997)
