= Marcel Hénaff =

French philosopher and anthropologist (1942–2018)

- Born: July 21, 1942; Hauteluce, Savoie, France
- Died: June 11, 2018 (aged 75); San Diego, California, U.S.
- Occupations: Philosopher, anthropologist

Marcel Hénaff (July 21, 1942 – June 11, 2018) was a French philosopher and anthropologist. He taught at the Collège international de philosophie and the University of California, San Diego. He was the author of several books, including two about Claude Lévi-Strauss.
