= Yvon Taillandier =

French artist and author (1926–2018)

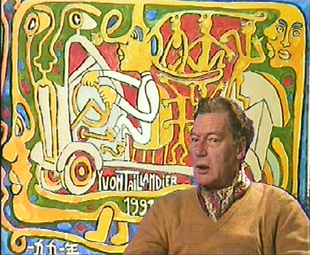
Taillandier talking in 1995.

Yvon Taillandier (28 March 1926 in Paris – 3 March 2018 in Paris) was a French artist, author and critic.

== Biography ==
Taillandier was Secretary of the Salon de Mai Committee for 44 years. Taillandier contributed for 14 years to the journal Connaissance des Arts (Acquaintance with the Arts) and contributed works to the Salon de Mai, Salon des Réalités Nouvelles, Salon de la Jeune Peinture, Salon Comparaisons, Salon Grands et Jeunes d'Aujourd'hui, Salon d'Art Sacré and Salon Figuration Critique.

Taillandier died in Paris on 3 March 2018 at the age of 91.

== Selected publications ==
- 1949. Essai sur Giotto. Editions Hypérion.
- 1960. Le voyage de l'œil, couverture illustrée par Lanskoy. Editions Calmann-Lévy
- Flammarion. Collection Les Maîtres de la peinture moderne
- 1961. Cézanne
- 1963. Monet
- 1967. Corot
- 1967. Rodin
- 1964. En collaboration avec Camille Bryen, livre-objet intitulé Un spectacle initiatique
- 1969. L'abstrait. Une histoire globale de l'art et du monde. Collection Les métamorphoses de l'humanité. Editions Planète
- 1970. Dessins de Wifredo Lam (Collection dirigée par Alex Grall) Denoël
- 1972. Miro à l'encre. Editions XXè siècle
- 1975. Texte dans l'ouvrage collectif San Lazarro et ses amis publié en hommage à San Lazarro, après sa mort. Editions XXè siècle
