= Maciej Stroiński =

Polish literary translator, theatre critic, and academic teacher (born 1984)

- Born: 1984 (age 41–42)
- Other names: Stroix, Destroix
- Citizenship: Polish
- Education: Jagiellonian University
- Occupations: literary translator, theatre critic, academic teacher

Maciej Stroiński (born 1984) is a Polish literary translator from English, theatre critic, academic teacher at the Jagiellonian University and blogger.

== Biography ==
He comes from a rural background. He graduated with a degree in film studies from the Institute of Audiovisual Arts of the Jagiellonian University. In 2013, he earned a PhD in art studies for his thesis Samowiedza negatywna judaizmu w najnowszym kinie izraelskim i diaspory żydowskiej w Stanach Zjednoczonych, (The Negative Self-Knowledge of Judaism in the Most Recent Israeli Cinema and the Jewish Diaspora in the United States) supervised by Tadeusz Lubelski. He has lectured at the Center for Inter-Faculty Individual Studies in the Humanities of the Jagiellonian University, for MISH students and in English for Erasmus+ exchange students; and at the Faculty of Polish Studies of the Jagiellonian University.

He ran the theater blog Teatr jest cute. He published in “Ha!art”, E-teatr.pl, “Teatr", “Tygodnik Powszechny”, “Znak”, “Dwutygodnik”, and “Krytyka Polityczna”. In December 2016, he became a member of the editorial board and a regular reviewer of the quarterly "Przekrój". In 2016, he was a member of the jury of Radio Kraków's "Transfer" theater competition for the best radio adaptation of a play. Łukasz Drewniak wrote about him: “A phenomenon. A Petronius of our times, an arbiter elegantiarum. Child in Time. Only a child can say without hesitation: good or bad; I'm afraid of this, I want that; that lady is a jerk, that gentleman – brilliant! A child says all this with impunity and doesn't even have to explain why. (...) Stroiński irreversibly kinderized Polish theater criticism”.

In 2020, due to the lockdown following the outbreak of the COVID-19 pandemic, he interrupted his work as a theatre critic and focused on translations. He became a member of the Association of Literary Translators and the ZAiKS Authors' Association. He also became a member of the Polish PEN Club. He received a translation grant from the Irish government under the Literature Ireland programme, a ZAiKS scholarship from the Fund for the Promotion of Creativity, and a creative scholarship from the Minister of Culture and National Heritage in the field of literature. In 2022, he received the Krakow City of Literature UNESCO Award for his project “Oscar Wilde's Dramas” (Officyna). He also received second prize (as one of three distinguished winners) in the PEN Club and ZAiKS literary competition “Freedom of Thought – Freedom of Expression” for his translation of Shalom Auslander's The Metamorphosis. He is interested in opera and camp. He has translated works of Oscar Wilde, John Edward Williams, Peter Shaffer, and Shalom Auslander into Polish. In March 2023, Wojciech Szot called him "one of the most talented translators of the younger generation".

== Works ==
=== Edition ===
- Kino polskie jako kino narodowe (edited together with Tadeusz Lubelski), Ha!art, 2009

=== Translations into Polish language ===
- Oscar Wilde, De profundis (Wydawnictwo Sic!, 2018)
- Shalom Auslander, Mother for Dinner (Wydawnictwo Filtry, 2022)
- John Edward Williams, Stoner (Wydawnictwo Filtry, 2023)
- Shalom Auslander, Foreskin's Lament (Wydawnictwo Filtry, 2023)
- David Sedaris, Happy-Go-Lucky (Wydawnictwo Filtry, 2024)
- John Edward Williams, Augustus (Wydawnictwo Filtry, 2025)
- Gwendoline Riley, My Phantoms (as Moje zmory; Wydawnictwo Czarne, 2025)
