= Transcription (Lerner novel) =

2026 novel by Ben Lerner

- Cover of the book.
- Author: Ben Lerner
- Language: English
- Publisher: Farrar, Straus and Giroux
- Publication date: 2026
- Pages: 130
- ISBN: 978-0-374-61859-9

Transcription is a 2026 novel by Ben Lerner, published by Farrar, Straus and Giroux. It follows a 45-year-old man as he interviews his mentor shortly before the mentor’s death, and events that follow.

Transcription won the 2026 Orwell Prize for Political Fiction.

== Writing and publication ==
Ben Lerner published three novels before Transcription: Leaving the Atocha Station (2011), 10:04 (2014), and The Topeka School (2019). He was inspired to write Transcription after being asked, in 2024, if he wanted to interview the poet Rosmarie Waldrop. The character of Thomas is said to be partly inspired by German author, filmmaker, and intellectual Alexander Kluge, with whom Lerner worked on a number of projects.

The novel was published by Farrar, Straus and Giroux. At around 130 pages long, divided into three sections, it is Lerner's shortest novel.

== Plot ==
Transcription follows an unnamed 45-year-old narrator, who has returned to Providence, Rhode Island, to interview his 90-year-old mentor, Thomas. Shortly before he is due to conduct the interview, he accidentally knocks his phone into water, and it dies, leaving him without a working recording device.

He arrives at Thomas's house and they begin talking. The narrator lies to Thomas and tells him their discussion is being recorded.

Part 2 takes place in Spain following an event organized to honor Thomas after his death. At the event, the narrator revealed that what had been published as an account of his conversation with Thomas was an imagined reconstruction. He debated the ethics of having done so.

Part 3 consists of a conversation between Max, Thomas's son, and the narrator. Max talks about his daughter's struggles with an eating disorder and his father's near-death experience of catching COVID-19 early in the pandemic.

== Reception ==
In The Guardian, Sukhdev Sandhu called Transcription a "stunning exploration of technology and storytelling", while Kirkus Reviews called it “a tart meditation on narrative and integrity” and praised its engagement with themes of technology, miscommunication, and identity. The New York Times described it as making "a case for the vitality of the [novel]" and Katie Tobin of Jacobin called the book a "penetrating meditation on fraudulence, fatherhood, and the fate of authentic experience in our digital age".

Orwell Prize judging chair Fiammetta Rocco called Transcription "a forensic study of our insatiable appetite for new technology" and described it as "funny, brainy and timely", adding, "Lerner deserves to be a household name."
