= Orli Auslander =

British-born artist

Orli Auslander is a British-born Israeli artist, writer, and illustrator known for her feminist work.

== Life and career ==
Auslander began her career in millinery, creating hats for celebrities and working with designers like Cynthia Rowley. She also worked on the costumes for the movie Clueless and the CBS sitcom High Society. Auslander later became a DJ and producer for Z93, and then WLIR, where she hosted a show under the pseudonym "The English Muffin." She left radio in 2003 and returned to making art, exhibiting her work in solo shows such as "Pretty/Ugly," which dealt with her personal experience with misogyny and sexism.

In 2016, Auslander published her first artist's book, I Feel Bad, All Day, Every Day. About Everything., a collection of autobiographical drawings and text about the guilt associated with being a woman and a mother. The book was published by Blue Rider Press, an imprint of Penguin Random House, and was reviewed positively by The New York Times Book Review. The book was later adapted into a TV comedy series, I Feel Bad, by NBC, which premiered in 2018 and starred Sarayu Blue and Paul Adelstein. Auslander served as a consulting producer on the series, which was cancelled after one season.

Auslander's work has been described as bold and provocative, and her drawing style has been praised for capturing her unique perspective. She has spoken openly about her struggles with neuroses and balancing motherhood with her career.

== Personal life ==
Auslander is married to American novelist and essayist Shalom Auslander and resides in California. They have two children.
