= Nidadavolu Malathi =

Writer from Andhra Pradesh, India

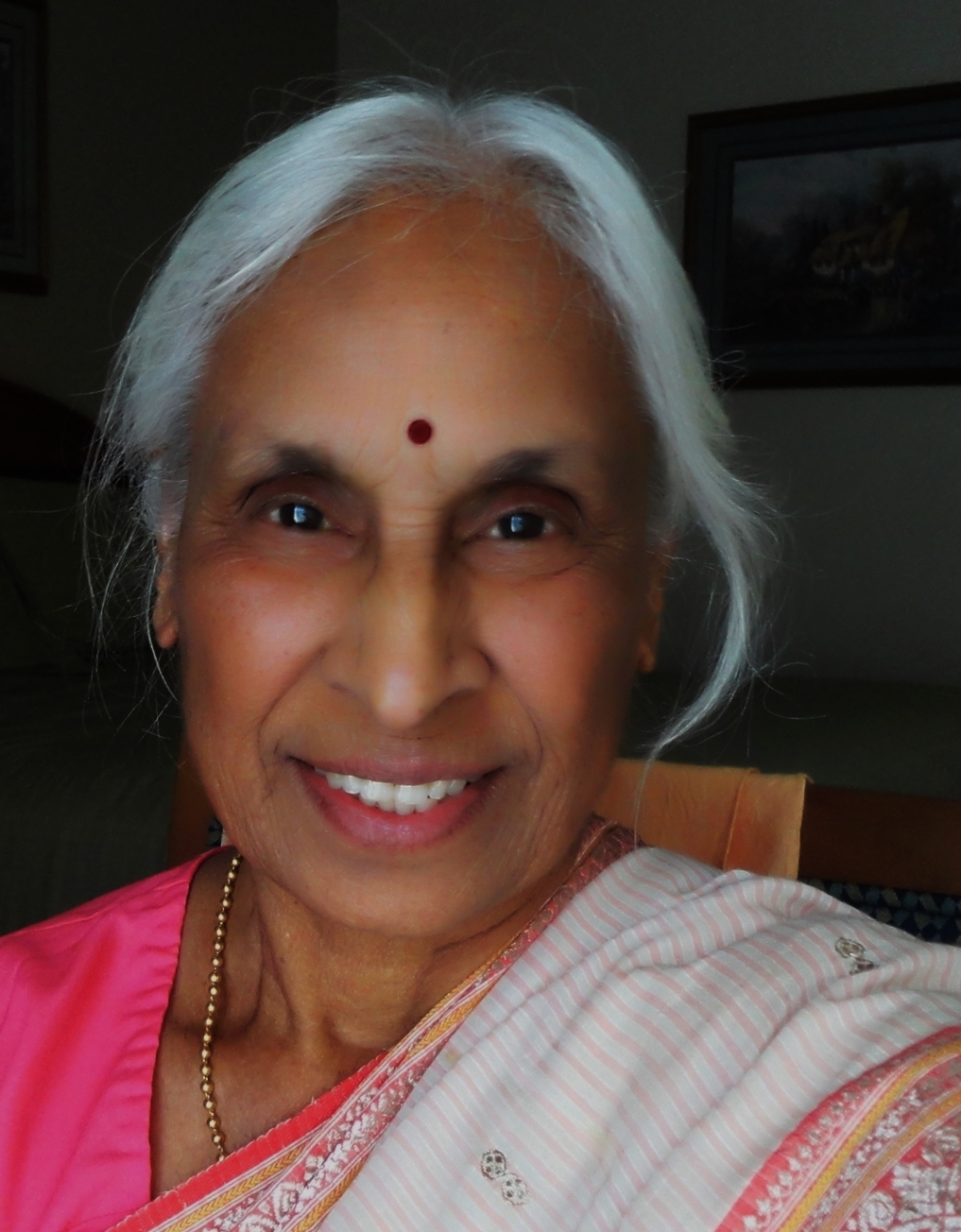
- Nidadavolu Malathi
- Born: Nidadavolu Malathi; 26 June 1937 (age 89); Visakhapatnam
- Education: M.A English, Andhra University/Venkateshwara University & M.A Library Science from University of Delhi
- Occupation: Writer
- Employer: Librarian At Tirupathi (Before 1973, for 9 Years)
- Known for: Writer
- Children: Sarayu Rao
- Parents: Nidadavolu Jagannatha Rao (father); Nidadavolu Seshamma (mother)
- Website: thulika.net

Nidadavolu Malathi is a Telugu writer from Andhra Pradesh, India. She is a short story writer, essayist, literary critic, and translator. Her daughter Sarayu Rao is a Hollywood actress.

== Early life and education ==
Nidadavolu Malathi hails from Visakhapatnam, Andhra Pradesh, India. She was born to Sri Nidadavolu Jagannatha Rao and Seshamma on 26 June 1937. Her father worked as a Maths teacher in Theosophical Society High school, Adyar, Madras. Both her parents cherished progressive views, which are reflected in their children's upbringing. Malathi has Masters's degrees in English Language and Literature from Andhra University and Sri Venkateswara University; and master's degree in Library Science from University of Delhi. She worked as Assistant Librarian, and Librarian in Sri Venkateswara University from 1964 to 1973. She moved to America in November 1973. She also taught Telugu as Second Language in University of Wisconsin, Madison, during 1978–2006.

== Literary activity ==
Malathi started writing stories in the early 1950s in Telugu, and has published in several prominent magazines of the times. After arriving in the United States in 1973, she started writing in English as well. She has a website, thulika.net wherein she publishes English translations of Telugu stories. It was started in June 2001, and features 120 translations and critical/analytical essays by Malathi, a few by other translators. Malathi has published translations of her own stories, My Little Friend and Other Stories in e-book format.

Malathi publishes her original stories and articles in Telugu on her blog Telugu thulika. In response to a question why her stories are not appearing in magazines in India, she said it was basically a communication problem. After moving to the U.S., she found herself alienated from the literary circles in India for want of regular communication channels. As a result, we do not find her stories in Indian journals. Nevertheless, she remains active on her Telugu blog, website, and other Internet avenues. Malathi created the site thulika.net, in June 2001 with the specific goal of introducing Telugu traditions and culture to non-Telugu readers through eminent Telugu fiction and informative articles. Her passion for disseminating Telugu cultural values and traditions, and commitment to putting into practice what she believes in are noteworthy. She finds it gratifying that university professors and scholars in the U.S., Britain, Canada and France have welcomed these articles. Some of her articles have been reprinted, and some referenced; that gave her additional motivation and impetus to continue her work. Thulika site is dedicated to introducing exclusively Telugu writers and Telugu stories to non-Telugu-speaking audience around the world, and she remains committed to that end. Malathi selects only stories that depict a wide variety of views, perceptions, lifestyles that are peculiar to Telugu people, traditions, and culture.

As of January 2022, the site has featured 198 articles. 137 Telugu stories in translation (120 translated by Malathi.). 53 Analytical/informative articles. (48 written by Malathi.). Some of the articles by Malathi such as "What is a Good Story?", "Dynamics of Transcultural Translation", "Native Element in Telugu Stories," and informative articles such as "Atukuri Molla", "Kanuparti Varalakshmamma", "Bhandaru Acchamamba", "Nidudavolu Venkata Rao" have been well-received, and being used as reference sources by research scholars around the world. Thulika.net is a one-person operation; receives no money and offers no remuneration for published articles.

== Honors and awards ==
1968 and 1969. Nidadavolu Malathi was honored at Andhra Pradesh Women Writers Conferences organized by Andhra Pradesh Sahitya Akademi.

1970. Her short story, "thrushna", received special prize in Ugadi short story competition conducted by Andhra Jyothi Weekly, and published on 10 April 1970. It has been translated into Hindi by Yelamanchili Lakshmibai, and published in Andhra Pradesh Magazine in April–May 1972 issue.

1971. "Chiruchakram" [The Small Wheel] received first prize in Ugadi [Telugu New Year] Short Story Competition, and published in Andhra Jyothi weekly magazine, 2 April 1971. For English translation, A Small Wheel, see thulika.net. Also, the story has been translated into Kannada by Nirupama, and published in Sudha magazine, 13 June 1971.

2022. Sirikona Sahitya Peetham honored Malathi with a memento. And, Koduru Parvati Smaraka puraskaram (Award) was given to Malathi on 10 September 2022.

2023. Molla Satkararam (Award). received on March 11, 2023.

== Other Honors ==
Bonala Subbalakshmi conducted research on Malathi's stories under the direction of Prof. Kolavennu Malayavasini and received M.Phil. degree from Andhra University in 2004.

== Literary works ==
In Telugu

In e-Book format: Novels

- Chatakapakshulu
- Maarpu

Anthologies of short stories:

- kathaamalathi. v.1
- kathaamalathi. v.2
- kathaamalathi. v.3
- kathaamalathi. v.4
- kathaamalathi. v.5
- kathamalathi. v.6.
- inte sangatulu (An anthology of various articles)

Anthologies of critical/informative articles:

- vyasamalathi. v.1
- vyasamalathi. v.2
- vyasamalathi. v.3
- vyasamalathi. v.4.

Anthologies of miscellaneous short short fiction and articles:

- ennemma kathalu. v.1
- ennemma kathalu. v. 2

Books in print in English: Her translations have been published in 3 volumes:

- Spectrum of My People (Jaico), (republished under the title, Short Stories From Andhra Pradesh). 2006 and 2009.
- Front Porch (Sahitya Academi). 2009.
- Penscape, An Anthology of Telugu Short Stories (published by Lekhini, Hyderabad). 2011.
- Beyond the Shores of the River Existentialism. Translation of Astitvanaadam aavali teeraana by Municipalle Raju. Delhi: Sahitya Akademi. 2023.

Books in print in Telugu

- nijaaniki feminijaaniki madhya (kathala sankalanam). Vizianagaram. BSR Foundation, 2006. (out of print)
- Chataka pakshulu. A Novel. Vijayawada. EMESCO. 2010
- kathala attayyagaru, (anthology of 22 short stories in Telugu). Hyderabad, Andhra Pradesh, India : Visalandhra Publishing House, 2010. Outside India, distributed by avkf.org.
- Nidadavolu Malathi Rachanaa Sourabhaalu. A book by Seela Subhadra Devi. Hyderabad. Astra Publishers. 2022

== Gallery ==
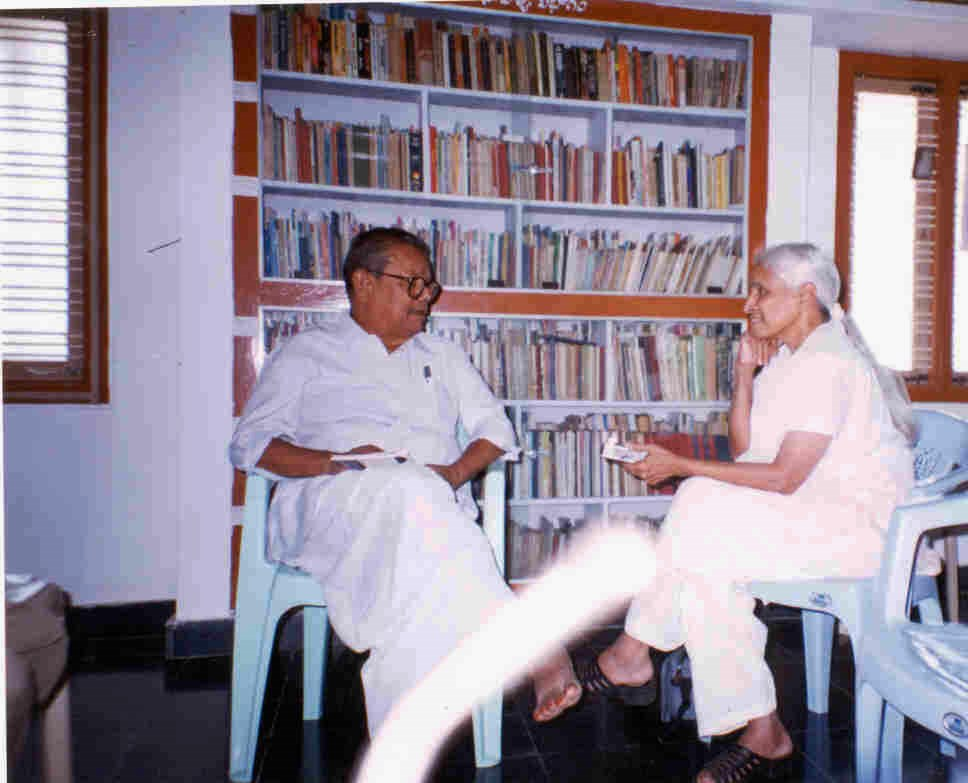
Malathi WithKalipatnam Ramarao Kathanilayam

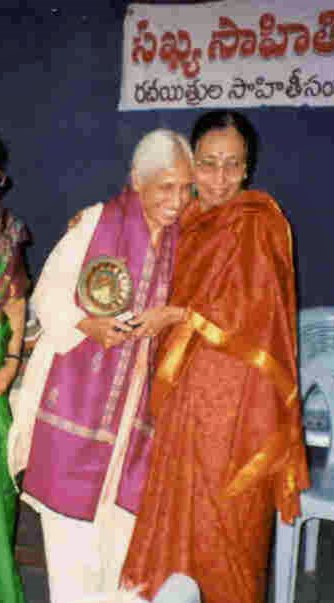
Malathi Participating in Sahitisadassu
