= V. V. Rajendra Kumar =

Indian art director, publicity designer and film producer

V.V. Rajendra Kumar
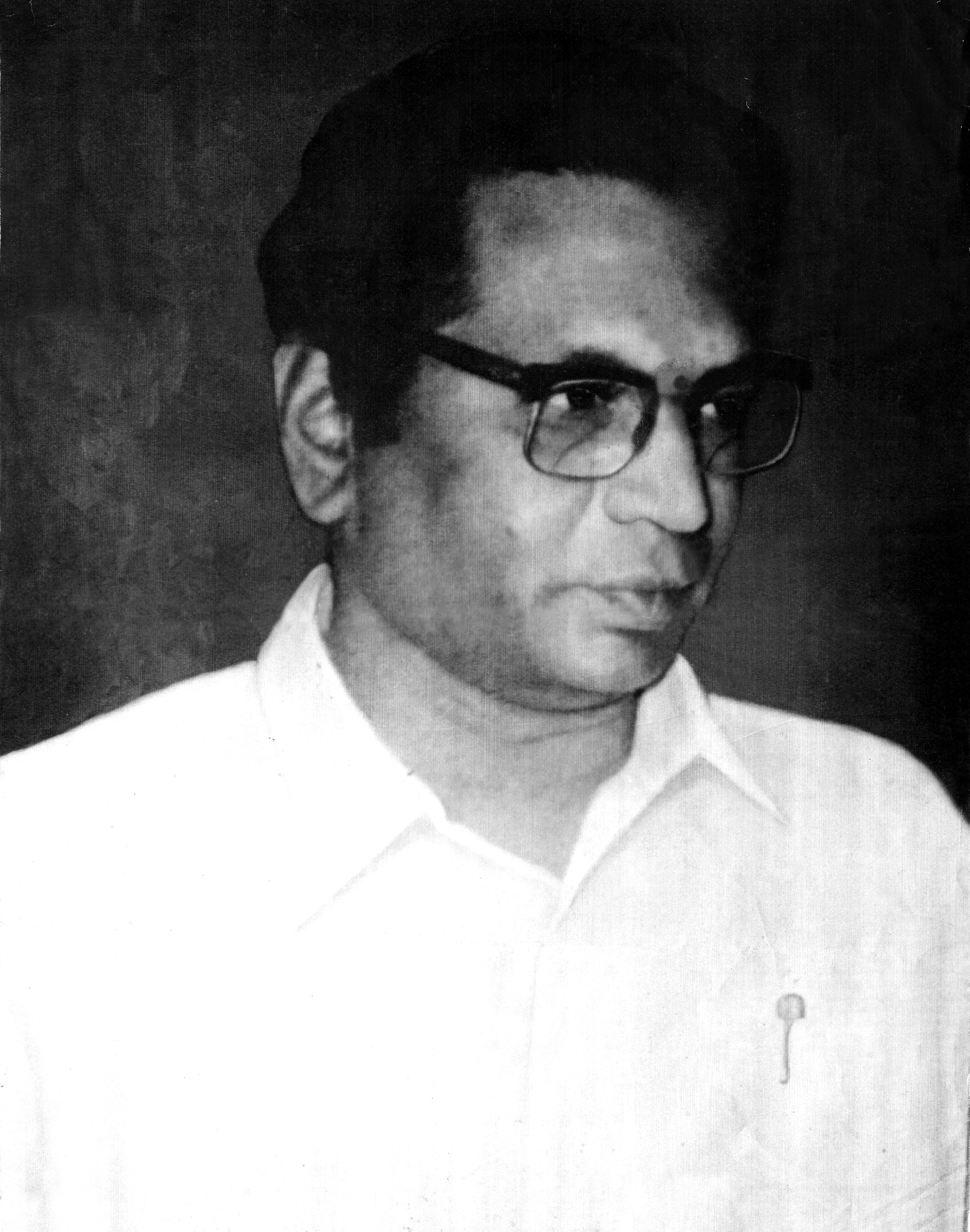
- Born: Chalapathi Naidu; 1932; Koruturu, Nellore, India
- Died: 13 February 1981; Chennai, Tamil Nadu, India

Vantimitta Venkata Rajendra Kumar shortly V. V. Rajendra Kumar (b: 1932 - d: 13 February 1981) was an Indian art director, publicity designer (Studio Roopkala) and film producer (Adithya Chitra Films).

Some of the notable films he worked on are Ramudu Bheemudu (1964) and Sri Krishna Tulabharam (1966). His first film as art director was Gutta Ramineedu's Chivaraku Migiledi (1960). He also produced Mathru Murthy (1971), Manushulanta Okkate (1976) and Mahapurushudu (1981).

== Early life ==
Rajendra Kumar was born as Chalapathi Naidu in Koruturu, Nellore District, Andhra Pradesh, in 1932. He was often known in the film industry as V. V. R. Kumar. He assisted the National Film Award-winning art director T. V. S. Sarma before working independently.

== Career ==
His first film as an art director was Chivaraku Migiledi (1960). Apart from Telugu movies, he worked on 15 Tamil films by C. V. Sridhar's Chitralaya and V. C. Guhanathan. His first film as a producer was Mathru Murthy (1971) in partnership with Kandepi Satyanarayana. His second film as producer, Manushulanta Okkate (1976), was the first partnership of the director Dasari Narayana Rao and the actor Nandamuri Taraka Rama Rao. The producer credit published for his films was V. Mahesh, who is his younger brother.

== Personal life ==
Kumar had two sisters named Smt. V. Sudarsanamma, Late Smt. S. Leelavathi, and a brother Late Sri. V. Mahesh who is a film and television producer and writer. Kumar was married and had three daughters named Suhasini, Sunandini and Shalini, and a son, V. Yajuvendra.

== Filmography ==
Below is a list of few films worked by Kumar as an art director. Apart from the below listed films, Kumar worked on over 100 movies as publicity designer under his company Studio Roopkala.

Year	Film	Language	Director
1957	Bhagyavati	Telugu	L. V. Prasad
1958	Parvathi Kalyanam	Telugu	K. Bhaskar Rao
1959	Manorama	Telugu	K. Bhaskar Rao
1960	Chivaraku Migiledi	Telugu	Gutha Ramineedu
1962	Santha	Telugu	Manapuram Appa Rao
1963	Paruvu Prathishta	Telugu	Manapuram Appa Rao
1963	Anuragam	Telugu	Gutha Ramineedu
1964	Vivaha Bandham	Telugu	P. Bhanumathi
1964	Ramudu Bheemudu	Telugu	Tapi Chanakya
1965	Prathigna Palana	Telugu	C. S. Rao
1965	Veelunama	Telugu	K. Hemambaradhara Rao
1966	Sri Krishna Tulabharam	Telugu	Kamalakara Kameswara Rao
1966	Sangeetha Lakshmi	Telugu	Giduturi Suryam
1966	Bhakta Potana	Telugu	Gutha Ramineedu
1967	Kambhoja Raju Katha	Telugu	Kamalakara Kameswara Rao
1967	Gruha Lakshmi	Telugu	P. Bhanumathi
1968	Pelli Roju	Telugu	Manapuram Appa Rao
1968	Papa Kosam	Telugu	G. V. R. Seshagiri Rao
1968	Kalisina Manasulu	Telugu	Kamalakara Kameswara Rao
1968	Bangaru Sankellu	Telugu	Gutha Ramineedu
1968	Bharya	Telugu	K. S. Prakash Rao
1969	Tara Sasankam	Telugu	Manapuram Appa Rao
1969	Sipayi Chinnayya	Telugu	G. V. R. Seshagiri Rao
1969	Bommalu Cheppina Katha	Telugu	G. Viswanadh
1969	Ardha Rathri	Telugu	Parvataneni Sambasiva Rao
1969	Pratikaram	Telugu	M. Nageswara Rao
1970	Drohi	Telugu	K. Bapaiah
1971	Naa Thammudu	Telugu	K. S. Prakash Rao
1971	Mathru Murthy	Telugu	Manapuram Appa Rao
1971	Mooga Prema	Telugu	Gutha Ramineedu
1972	Marapurani Thalli	Telugu	D. S. Prakash Rao
1972	Ooriki Upakari	Telugu	K. S. R. Das
1972	Anta Mana Manchike	Telugu	P. Bhanumathi
1974	Urimai Kural	Tamil	P. Sridhar
1974	Radhamma Pelli	Telugu	Dasari Narayana Rao
1974	Nitya Sumangali	Telugu	M.S. Arya
1974	Ammai Pelli	Telugu	G. V. R. Seshagiri Rao
1975	Swargam Narakam	Telugu	Dasari Narayana Rao
1975	Ramayya Tandri	Telugu	B. V. Prasad
1976	Manushulanta Okkate	Telugu	Dasari Narayana Rao
1977	Manassakshi	Telugu	Parvataneni Sambasiva Rao
1977	Madhurageetham	Tamil	V. C. Guhanadhan
1978	Enki Nayudu Bava	Telugu	Boina Subba Rao
1978	Machanai Paartheengala	Tamil	V. C. Guhanadhan
1981	Maha Purushudu	Telugu	P. Lakshmi Deepak
