= Bharya =

Bhāryā (Sanskrit for "wife") may refer to:

- Bharya (1962 film), an Indian Malayalam-language film
- Bharya, a 1968 Indian Telugu-language film with art direction by V. V. Rajendra Kumar
- Bharya, a 1994 Indian Malayalam-language film starring Urvashi
- Bharya (TV series), a 2016–2019 Indian Malayalam-language thriller series
- Bharya, an Indian Malayalam-language film series consisting of
  - Veruthe Oru Bharya (2008)
  - Bharya Athra Pora (2013)

== See also ==
- Bharia (disambiguation)
