= The Writers' Prize =

Literary prize for English-language fiction

- Awarded for: Literature published in the UK
- Sponsored by: The Folio Society (2014–2015), Rathbone Investment Management (2017–2023)
- Reward: £30,000
- First award: 2014; 12 years ago
- Final award: Active
- Website: thewritersprize.com

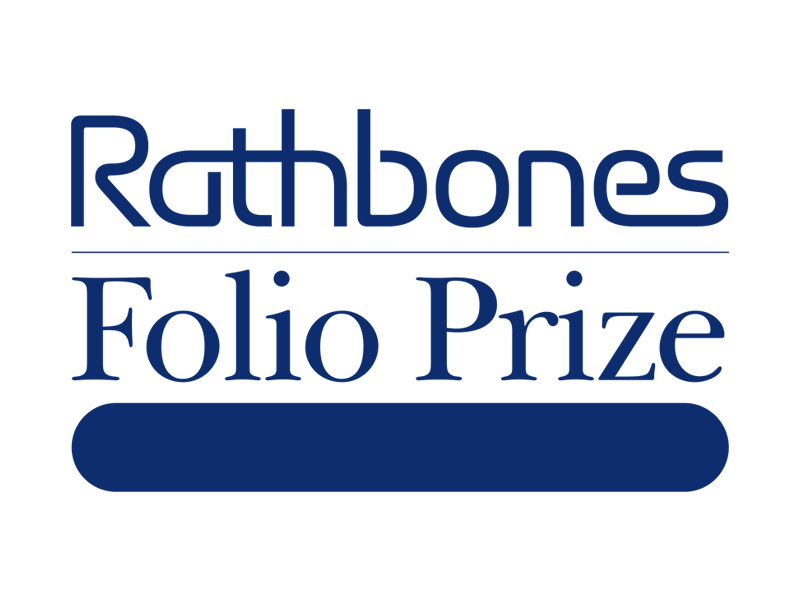
Rathbones Folio Prize Logo

The Writers' Prize, previously known as the Rathbones Folio Prize, the Folio Prize and The Literature Prize, is a literary award that was sponsored by the London-based publisher The Folio Society for its first two years, 2014–2015. Starting in 2017, the sponsor was Rathbone Investment Management. At the 2023 award ceremony, it was announced that the prize was looking for new sponsorship as Rathbones would be ending their support. In November 2023, having failed to secure a replacement sponsor, the award's governing body announced its rebrand as The Writers' Prize. The Folio Academy is the international group of writers and critics who nominate titles for the award.

== History of the prize ==
The prize came into being after a group in Britain "took umbrage at the direction they saw the Booker Prize taking – they saw it leaning toward popular fiction rather than literary fiction." It was described as "complementary to other awards" and "Booker without the bow ties". Margaret Atwood said that the Folio Prize is "much needed in a world in which money is increasingly becoming the measure of all things." Mark Haddon said it was "not a mechanism for generating publicity by propelling a single book into the spotlight but a celebration of literary fiction as a whole." The co-founders are Andrew Kidd and Kate Harvey. The prize is administered by the registered charity The Literature Prize Foundation.

The Folio Prize during the first two years was presented to an English-language book of fiction published in the UK by an author from any country. Prior to its launch it was called the "Literature Prize" as a placeholder until a sponsor was found; then renamed the Folio Prize in 2014, for the Folio Society, a publisher of special editions of classic literature. The prize remuneration in the first two years was £40,000. For 2017 and 2018 the prize amount was £20,000 and starting in 2019 it was increased to £30,000. In 2021, it was reported that the £30,000 prize money had been paid to cyber-criminals posing as 2020 winner Valeria Luiselli.

Beginning with the 2017 Rathbones sponsorship, the prize was awarded to the best new work of literature published in the English language during a given year, regardless of form (fiction, non-fiction and poetry). The Rathbones sponsorship supports a number of initiatives generated out of The Folio Academy, the group of writers who form the Prize's de facto governing body. Initiatives include a new academy mentorship scheme, in association with the charity First Story, which will mentor aspiring young writers, as well as a series of Rathbones Folio Sessions throughout the year in the form of literary workshops, lectures and debates.

The jury for the prize is called the academy, a body of more than 250 writers and critics that includes Margaret Atwood, Peter Carey, A. S. Byatt, Zadie Smith and J. M. Coetzee. Books are nominated by members of the academy, three each, ranked. Points are given to each book depending on how many first, second or third rankings are earned. The top scoring books are made into a longlist of 60 books (80 in the first two years), and the judges can "call in" another 20 books from their publishers. The list of 80 nominated titles is then judged by a panel of three to five judges drawn from the academy who select a shortlist (of eight titles, up to 2022) and the final winner. In 2024 there were no judges, and all 350 academy members were invited to vote for the winners.

In 2023, three shortlists of five titles each were introduced, in the genres of fiction, non-fiction and poetry, although the prize constitution and website state that the shortlists will contain four titles, as did some newspaper reports. The winner of each genre will receive a prize of £2,000 and the genre winners will be judged for the overall Folio Prize. In 2024, the three shortlists were reduced to three titles in each category as it transitioned to become The Writers' Prize.

In November 2023, having failed to secure a replacement sponsor, the award announced its rebrand as The Writers' Prize. According to its website, The Writers' Prize continues to be "nominated and judged exclusively by the Folio Academy".

== Recipients ==
Note that the prize had the following titles:

- Folio Prize: 2014–2015
- No prize awarded in 2016
- Rathbones Folio Prize: 2017–2023
- The Writers' Prize: Since 2024

Year	Author	Title	Result	Ref.
2014	George Saunders	Tenth of December: Stories	Winner	
2014	Kent Haruf	Benediction	Shortlist	
2014	Rachel Kushner	The Flamethrowers	Shortlist	
2014	Eimear McBride	A Girl Is a Half-formed Thing	Shortlist	
2014	Jane Gardam	Last Friends	Shortlist	
2014	Sergio De La Pava	A Naked Singularity	Shortlist	
2014	Anne Carson	Red Doc	Shortlist	
2014	Amity Gaige	Schroder	Shortlist	
2015	Akhil Sharma	Family Life	Winner	
2015	Ben Lerner	10:04	Shortlist	
2015	Miriam Toews	All My Puny Sorrows	Shortlist	
2015	Jenny Offill	Dept. of Speculation	Shortlist	
2015	Yvonne Adhiambo Owuor	Dust	Shortlist	
2015	Ali Smith	How to Be Both	Shortlist	
2015	Colm Tóibín	Nora Webster	Shortlist	
2015	Rachel Cusk	Outline	Shortlist	
2016	No prize awarded			
2017	Hisham Matar	The Return: Fathers, Sons and the Land in Between	Winner	
2017	Robin Yassin-Kassab and Leila Al-Shami	Burning Country: Syrians in Revolution and War	Shortlist	
2017	Maggie Nelson	The Argonauts	Shortlist	
2017	Madeleine Thien	Do Not Say We Have Nothing	Shortlist	
2017	Francis Spufford	Golden Hill	Shortlist	
2017	C. E. Morgan	The Sport of Kings	Shortlist	
2017	China Miéville	This Census-Taker	Shortlist	
2017	Laura Cumming	The Vanishing Man: In Pursuit of Velazquez	Shortlist	
2018	Richard Lloyd Parry	Ghosts of the Tsunami: Death and Life in Japan's Disaster Zone	Winner	
2018	Elizabeth Strout	Anything Is Possible	Shortlist	
2018	Sally Rooney	Conversations With Friends	Shortlist	
2018	Richard Beard	The Day That Went Missing	Shortlist	
2018	Mohsin Hamid	Exit West	Shortlist	
2018	Xiaolu Guo	Once Upon a Time in the East: A Story of Growing Up	Shortlist	
2018	Jon McGregor	Reservoir 13	Shortlist	
2018	Hari Kunzru	White Tears	Shortlist	
2019	Raymond Antrobus	The Perseverance	Winner	
2019	Ashleigh Young	Can You Tolerate This?	Shortlist	
2019	Guy Stagg	The Crossway	Shortlist	
2019	Alice Jolly	Mary Ann Sate, Imbecile	Shortlist	
2019	Anna Burns	Milkman	Shortlist	
2019	Diana Evans	Ordinary People	Shortlist	
2019	Tommy Orange	There There	Shortlist	
2019	Carys Davies	West	Shortlist	
2020	Valeria Luiselli	Lost Children Archive	Winner	
2020	Sinéad Gleeson	Constellations	Shortlist	
2020	Zadie Smith	Grand Union	Shortlist	
2020	Azadeh Moaveni	Guest House for Young Widows	Shortlist	
2020	Laura Cumming	On Chapel Sands	Shortlist	
2020	Ben Lerner	The Topeka School	Shortlist	
2020	Fiona Benson	Vertigo & Ghost	Shortlist	
2020	James Lasdun	Victory	Shortlist	
2021	Carmen Maria Machado	In the Dream House	Winner	
2021	Elaine Feeney	As You Were	Shortlist	
2021	Doireann Ní Ghríofa	A Ghost in the Throat	Shortlist	
2021	Sara Baume	handiwork	Shortlist	
2021	Amina Cain	Indelicacy	Shortlist	
2021	Monique Roffey	The Mermaid of Black Conch	Shortlist	
2021	Rachel Long	My Darling from the Lions	Shortlist	
2021	Caleb Femi	Poor	Shortlist	
2022	Colm Tóibín	The Magician	Winner	
2022	Philip Hoare	Albert & the Whale	Shortlist	
2022	Natasha Brown	Assembly	Shortlist	
2022	Sunjeev Sahota	China Room	Shortlist	
2022	Selima Hill	Men Who Feed Pigeons	Shortlist	
2022	Gwendoline Riley	My Phantoms	Shortlist	
2022	Damon Galgut	The Promise	Shortlist	
2022	Claire Keegan	Small Things Like These	Shortlist	
2023	Margo Jefferson	Constructing a Nervous System	Overall winner Non-fiction winner	
2023	Will Ashon	The Passengers	Non-fiction shortlist	
2023	Amy Bloom	In Love	Non-fiction shortlist	
2023	Jonathan Freedland	The Escape Artist	Non-fiction shortlist	
2023	Darren McGarvey	The Social Distance Between Us	Non-fiction shortlist	
2023	Michelle de Kretser	Scary Monsters	Fiction winner	
2023	NoViolet Bulawayo	Glory	Fiction shortlist	
2023	Sheila Heti	Pure Colour	Fiction shortlist	
2023	Daisy Hildyard	Emergency	Fiction shortlist	
2023	Elizabeth Strout	Lucy by the Sea	Fiction shortlist	
2023	Victoria Adukwei Bulley	Quiet	Poetry winner	
2023	Fiona Benson	Ephemeron	Poetry shortlist	
2023	Safiya Kamaria Kinshasa	Cane, Corn & Gully	Poetry shortlist	
2023	Zaffar Kunial	England's Green	Poetry shortlist	
2023	Yomi Ṣode	Manorism	Poetry shortlist	
2024	Laura Cumming	Thunderclap: A Memoir of Life and Art and Sudden Death	Non-fiction winner	
2024	Naomi Klein	Doppelganger: A Trip into the Mirror World	Nonfiction shortlist	
2024	Mark O'Connell	A Thread of Violence: A Story of Truth, Invention and Murder	Nonfiction shortlist	
2024	Anne Enright	The Wren, The Wren	Fiction winner	
2024	Paul Murray	The Bee Sting	Fiction shortlist	
2024	Zadie Smith	The Fraud	Fiction shortlist	
2024	Liz Berry	The Home Child	Overall winner Poetry winner	
2024	Jason Allen-Paisant	Self-Portrait as Othello	Poetry shortlist	
2024	Mary Jean Chan	Bright Fear	Poetry shortlist	
