= G. Ramineedu =

Indian film director

- Born: 5 October 1927; Chataparru, West Godavari District, Andhra Pradesh
- Died: 29 April 2009 (aged 81); Chennai, Tamilnadu
- Occupation: Director

G. Ramineedu (Telugu: గుత్తా రామినీడు) (5 October 1927 – 29 April 2009) was an Indian film director who worked in Telugu cinema. He is known for films such as Maa Inti Mahalakshmi (1959), Chivaraku Migiledi (1960), Palnati Yuddham (1966), Bangaru Sankellu (1968). Maa Inti Mahalakshmi and Palnati Yuddham received the Certificate of Merit for Best Feature Film in Telugu at the National Film Awards. Maa Inti Mahalakshmi also won the Filmfare Award for Best Film – Telugu. His last film Yagnam (1991) won the Nandi Award for Best Feature Film.

== Early life and career ==
He was born in Chataparru village, West Godavari district of Andhra Pradesh. He entered the cinema world in 1954. He worked as an Assistant Director for films like Charana Daasi (1956). He made his film directorial debut with Maa Inti Mahalakshmi (1959). It was the first picture completely shot in Hyderabad and Haranath debuted as a lead actor in this film. Famous actor Rao Gopal Rao worked as an assistant director for his film Bhakta Potana (1966) and in other films, including Bangaru Sankellu (1968), and Mooga Prema (1971). His last film Yagnam starring Bhanu Chander won the Nandi Award for Best Feature Film in 1991.

== Death ==
He died in Chennai on 29 April 2009 due to a kidney-related illness. His wife died in 2017. He is survived by three daughters and a son.

== Filmography ==
1. Maa Inti Mahalakshmi (1959) (Director)
2. Chivaraku Migiledi (1960) (Director)
3. Kalimilemulu (1962) (Director)
4. Anuragam (1963) (Director)
5. Bhakta Potana (1966) (Director)
6. Palnati Yuddham (1966) (Actor, Director and Producer)
7. Bangaru Sankellu (1968) (Writer and Director)
8. Mooga Prema (1971) (Director)
9. Pratikaram (1982) (Director)
10. Raj Kumar (1983) (Director)
11. Sanganatham (1984) (Director)
12. Yagnam (1991) (Director)

== Awards ==
National Film Awards

- 1959: Certificate of Merit for Best Feature Film in Telugu - Maa Inti Mahalakshmi
- 1966: Certificate of Merit for Best Feature Film in Telugu - Palnati Yuddham

Nandi Awards

- Best Feature Film - Gold - Yagnam
