= Maa Inti Mahalakshmi =

- Directed by: G. Ramineedu
- Written by: Tapi Dharma Rao; K. Pratyagatma (Dialogues)
- Story by: K. Pratyagatma
- Produced by: Parvathaneni Gangadhara Rao
- Starring: Jamuna; Haranath
- Cinematography: M. K. Raja
- Edited by: Akkineni Sanjeevi
- Music by: G. Aswathama
- Production company: Saradhi Studios
- Distributed by: Navashakthi Films
- Release date: 1959
- Country: India
- Language: Telugu

Maa Inti Mahalakshmi is a 1959 Indian Telugu-language family drama film directed by G. Ramineedu and written by K. Pratyagatma. It stars Jamuna and Haranath. It was produced by Parvathaneni Gangadhara Rao with music composed by G. Aswathama, while M. K. Raja and Akkineni Sanjeevi handled cinematography and editing respectively. It was the first Telugu film to be entirely shot in Hyderabad.

== Cast ==
- Jamuna
- Haranath
- Girija
- Gummadi
- Ramana Reddy
- Perumallu
- Suryakala
- Lakshmi Kantamma
- Aadoni Lakshmi

== Soundtrack ==
The film's music is composed by G. Aswathama, and released on His Master's Voice label.

Track list
No.	Title	Lyrics	Singer(s)	Length
1.	"Amani Madhuyamini"	Malladi Ramakrishna Sastry	P. B. Sreenivas, P. Susheela	6:31
2.	"Chivurulo Chilaka"	Malladi Ramakrishna Sastry	Vaidehi, R. Balasaraswathi Devi	3:21
3.	"Nuvvantene Naaku"	Aarudhra	Pithapuram Nageswara Rao	3:00
4.	"Eelavesi Piluvakoyi"	Aarudhra	Ghantasala, Jikki	3:15
5.	"Marindile Katha"	Malladi Ramakrishna Sastry	Jikki	3:02
6.	"Maname Nandana"	Malladi Ramakrishna Sastry	Jikki	3:25
7.	"Palike Chakkara Chilukalu"	Malladi Ramakrishna Sastry	P. Susheela	3:22
Total length:				25:56

== Awards ==
National Film Awards

- National Film Award for Best Feature Film in Telugu - 1959
