= Ben Lerner =

American writer (born 1979)

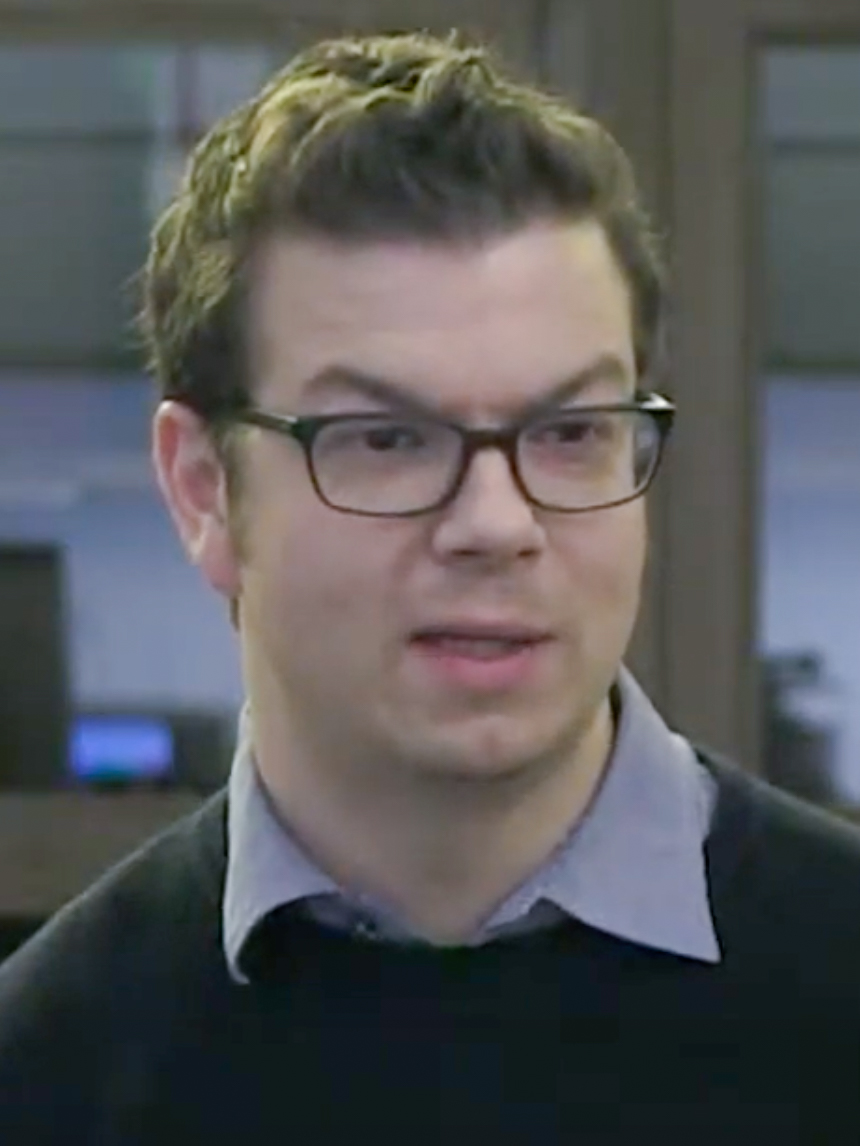
- Lerner in 2015
- Born: Benjamin S. Lerner; February 4, 1979 (age 47); Topeka, Kansas, U.S.
- Education: Brown University (BA, MFA)
- Occupations: Writer, critic
- Employer: Brooklyn College
- Writing career
- Genres: Poetry, novels, essays
- Notable awards: Fulbright Scholar; Guggenheim Fellowship; Believer Book Award; MacArthur Fellowship

Benjamin S. Lerner (born February 4, 1979) is an American poet, novelist, essayist, and critic. The recipient of fellowships from the Fulbright, Guggenheim, and MacArthur Foundations, Lerner's work has been a finalist for the National Book Award for Poetry, the National Book Critics Circle Award in fiction, and the Pulitzer Prize for Fiction. Lerner teaches at Brooklyn College, where he was named a Distinguished Professor of English in 2016.

== Early life and education ==
Lerner was born and raised in Topeka, Kansas. His parents, Stephen Lerner and Harriet Lerner, are both clinical psychologists. He is Jewish.

Lerner is a 1997 graduate of Topeka High School, where he participated in debate and forensics, winning the 1997 National Forensic League National Tournament in International Extemporaneous Speaking. At Brown University, he studied with poet C. D. Wright and earned a B.A. in political theory and an MFA in poetry.

== Career and reception ==
Lerner was awarded the Hayden Carruth prize for his cycle of 52 sonnets, The Lichtenberg Figures. In 2004, Library Journal named it one of the year's 12 best books of poetry.

In 2003, Lerner traveled on a Fulbright Scholarship to Madrid, Spain, where he wrote his second book of poetry, Angle of Yaw, which was published in 2006. It was named a finalist for the National Book Award. His third poetry collection, Mean Free Path, was published in 2010.

In 2008, Lerner began editing poetry for Critical Quarterly, a British scholarly publication. In 2016 he became the first poetry editor at Harper's Magazine. He has taught at California College of the Arts and the University of Pittsburgh, and in 2010 joined the faculty of the MFA program at Brooklyn College. He was an original signatory of the manifesto "Refusing Complicity in Israel's Literary Institutions", which endorses a boycott of Israeli cultural institutions, including publishers and literary festivals.

Lerner's first novel, Leaving the Atocha Station, published in 2011, won the Believer Book Award and was a finalist for the Los Angeles Times Book Prize for first fiction (The Art Seidenbaum Award for First Fiction) and the New York Public Library's Young Lions Fiction Award. Writing in The Guardian, Geoff Dyer called it "a work so luminously original in style and form as to seem like a premonition, a comet from the future."

Excerpts of Lerner's second novel, 10:04, won the Terry Southern Prize from The Paris Review. Writing in the Los Angeles Review of Books, Maggie Nelson called 10:04 a "near perfect piece of literature". The New York Times named 10:04 one of the best books of the 21st century.

The New York Times Book Review called Lerner's 2019 novel The Topeka School "a high-water mark in recent American fiction". Giles Harvey, in The New York Times Magazine, called it "the best book yet by the most talented writer of his generation". The New York Times also named it one of the ten best books of the year. Lerner's essays, art criticism, and literary criticism have appeared in Harper's Magazine, the London Review of Books, The New York Review of Books, and The New Yorker, among other publications. The Topeka School, which won the Los Angeles Times Book Prize, was a finalist for the 2020 Pulitzer Prize for Fiction.

In 2023, Lerner published his fourth full-length book of poetry, both verse and prose poems, The Lights. In The New York Times, Srikanth Reddy wrote: "It takes a poet to invent characters who argue that 'the voice must be sung into existence.' It takes a novelist to honor so many perspectives, histories and intimacies in one book. The poet/novelist of The Lights enlarges Baudelaire’s experiments in prose poetry into a multistory dream house for contemporary American readers." In The New Yorker, Kamran Javadizadeh called The Lights "world-bridging poetry", "uncannily beautiful", and "exceedingly lovely".

In 2026, Lerner published his fourth novel, Transcription. The judges of the 2026 Orwell Prize for Political Fiction, which Lerner won, said that Transcription "explores the unreliable stories we tell ourselves about hunger, love and connection...It is about dying with dignity and growing up in a new world. It's funny, brainy and timely. Lerner deserves to be a household name."

== Personal life ==
Lerner is married to Ariana Mangual Figueroa, a professor at CUNY Graduate Center. They have two daughters.

== Awards ==
- 2003 – Hayden Carruth Award
- 2003–2004 – Fulbright Fellowship
- 2006 – Finalist, National Book Award for Angle of Yaw.
- 2006 – Finalist, Northern California Book Awards for Angle of Yaw
- 2007 – Kansas Notable Book Award for Angle of Yaw
- 2010–2011 – Howard Foundation Fellowship
- 2011 – Preis der Stadt Münster für internationale Poesie
- 2011 – Finalist, Los Angeles Times Book Prize for first fiction
- 2012 – Finalist, Young Lions Fiction Award of the New York Public Library
- 2012 – Believer Book Award
- 2012 – Finalist, William Saroyan International Prize for Writing
- 2012 – Finalist, PEN/Bingham Award
- 2013 – Finalist, James Tait Black Memorial Prize
- 2013 – Guggenheim Fellowship
- 2014 – Terry Southern Fiction Prize from The Paris Review
- 2014 – Finalist, Folio Prize
- 2017 – named one of Granta's best young American novelists
- 2015–2020 Winner, MacArthur Foundation Fellowship
- 2019 – Finalist, Folio Prize
- 2019 – Finalist, National Book Critics Circle Award
- 2019 – Winner, Kansas Notable Book Award
- 2019 – Winner, Los Angeles Times Book Prize for Fiction
- 2020 – Finalist, Pulitzer Prize for Fiction
- 2024 – Longlisted for the Griffin Poetry Prize
- 2026 - Winner, George Orwell Prize for Political Fiction

== Bibliography ==
=== Books of poetry ===
- The Lichtenberg Figures. Port Townsend: Copper Canyon Press. 2004. ISBN 1556592116.
- Angle of Yaw. Port Townsend: Copper Canyon Press. 2006. ISBN 1556592469.
- Mean Free Path. Port Townsend: Copper Canyon Press. 2010. ISBN 978-1619320741.
- No Art. London: Granta Books. 2016. ISBN 978-1783782758. (Collection of previous three volumes)
- The Lights. New York: Farrar, Straus and Giroux 2023. ISBN 978-0374279219

=== Novels ===
- Leaving the Atocha Station, Coffee House Press, 2011. ISBN 978-1566892926
- 10:04, Farrar, Straus and Giroux, 2014. ISBN 978-0865478107
- The Topeka School, Farrar, Straus and Giroux, 2019. ISBN 978-0374277789
- Transcription, Farrar, Straus and Giroux, 2026. ISBN 978-0374618599

=== Non-fiction ===
- The Hatred of Poetry. FSG Originals, 2016. ISBN 978-0865478206

=== Edited volumes ===
- Keeping / the window open: Interviews, Statements, Alarms, Excursions. On Keith and Rosmarie Waldrop. Wave Books, 2019.

=== Collaborations with artists ===
- Blossom. Mack Books, 2015. With Thomas Demand.
- The Polish Rider. Mack Books, 2018. With Anna Ostoya.
- The Snows of Venice. Spector Books, 2018. With Alexander Kluge
- Gold Custody. Mack Books, 2021. With Barbara Bloom
- The Clichés. Song Cave Editions, 2022. With R. H. Quaytman

=== Short fiction online ===
- "The Golden Vanity". The New Yorker. June 11, 2012.
- "The Polish Rider". The New Yorker. May 20, 2016.
- "Ross Perot and China". The New Yorker. May 20, 2019.
- "The Media". The New Yorker. April 13, 2020.
- "Café Loup". The New Yorker. August 29, 2022.
- "The Ferry". The New Yorker. April 3, 2023.

=== Poems online ===
- "Untitled (Triptych)". Harper's Magazine. Vol. 331, no. 1983. August 2015.
- "Also Known as Hurtsickle, Cyani Flower, and Bachelor's Button". The New York Review of Books. Vol. LXIII, no. 10. June 9, 2016.
- "The Pistil". The New York Review of Books. Vol. LXV, no. 11. June 28, 2018.
- "Les Marronniers". The New York Review of Books. Vol. LXVI, no. 14. September 26, 2019.
- "The Rose". The New York Review of Books. Vol. LXVII, no. 12. July 23, 2020.
- "The Son". The New York Review of Books. Vol. LXVII, no. 18. November 19, 2020.
- "The Lights". The New York Review of Books. Vol. LXIX, no. 12. July 21, 2022.
- "Meridian Response". The New York Review of Books. Vol. LXVIII, no. 12. July 22, 2021.
- "The Rescue". The New York Review of Books. Vol. LXX, no. 14. September 21, 2023.
- "National Vaccine Injury Compensation Program". The New York Review of Books. Vol. LXXII, no. 8. May 15, 2025.

=== Non-fiction online ===
- "Contest of Words". Harper's Magazine. Vol. 325, no. 1949. October 2012.
- "Robert Walser's Disappearing Acts". The New Yorker. September 3, 2013.
- "The Hofmann Wobble". Harper's Magazine. December 2023.
- "Cardiography: After open-heart surgery". The New York Review of Books. Vol. LXXII, no. 17. November 6, 2025.

=== Book Introductions ===
- Lerner, Ben (2013). Introduction. A Schoolboy's Diary. By Robert Walser. Translated by Damion Searls. The New York Review of Books.
