= Tadeusz Lubelski =

Polish film historian and theorist

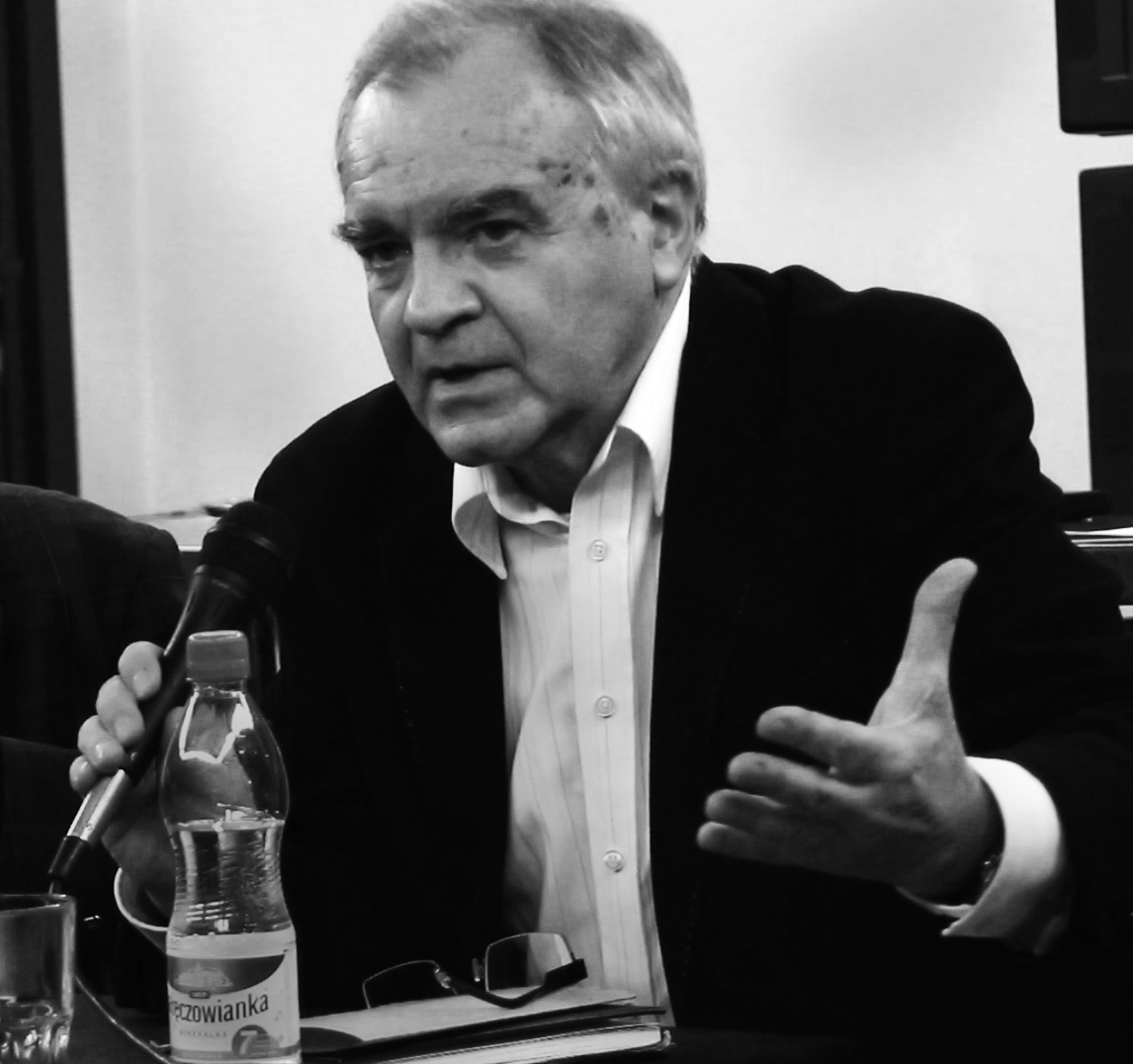
- Born: Karol Tadeusz Lubelski; 1 July 1949; Gliwice
- Citizenship: Polish
- Education: Jagiellonian University
- Occupations: film historian, film theorist

Tadeusz Lubelski (born 1 July 1949) is a Polish film historian, theorist and critic specializing in Polish and French cinema, translator, professor of the humanities, member of the European Film Academy.

A film academic, he was associated with the University of Silesia and with the Jagiellonian University respectively. He was the director of the Institute of the Audio-Visual Arts of the Jagiellonian University (2008–2012). He also taught Polish language at Sorbonne (1989–1993). He authored and edited a number of books, including the first Polish thematic Encyklopedia kina (Encyclopedia of the Cinema) and the comprehensive series Historia kina (The History of Cinema). Since 1994, he has been the deputy editor-in-chief of the Kino monthly. Between 1995 and 2001, he has been the Programme Director of the Kraków Film Festival.

== Biography ==
He was born in a family originating in Lviv.

In 1971 he graduated in Polish studies from the Jagiellonian University. He worked as an assistant at the Jagiellonian University between 1971 and 1973. Then, between 1973 and 1981, he worked at the University of Silesia, where in 1979 he defended his doctoral dissertation on the poetics of Tadeusz Konwicki's novels and films. In the years 1981–1984 he was the Head of the Film and TV Department of the Jagiellonian University. Then he worked at the Jagiellonian University as an adjunct (1984–1992). In the years 1989–1993 he was a Polish language teacher at Sorbonne. In 1993, he obtained the postdoctoral degree of habilitation in the field of art sciences at the Faculty of Philology of the Jagiellonian University.

In 2002, he was awarded the title of professor of the humanities. He was respectively the deputy director (2002–2008) and the director (2008–2012) of the Institute of the Audio-Visual Arts of the Jagiellonian University. Afterwards, he has been continuing his work at the institute. He was the promoter of nineteen doctoral dissertations, as well as a reviewer of over twenty doctoral and postdoctoral dissertations. His students included Katarzyna Kubisiowska and Maciej Stroiński.

In 1994 he became the deputy editor-in-chief of the Kino monthly. He is a member of the editorial board of the Kwartalnik Filmowy (Film Quarterly). As a film critic, he also contributed to Tygodnik Powszechny.

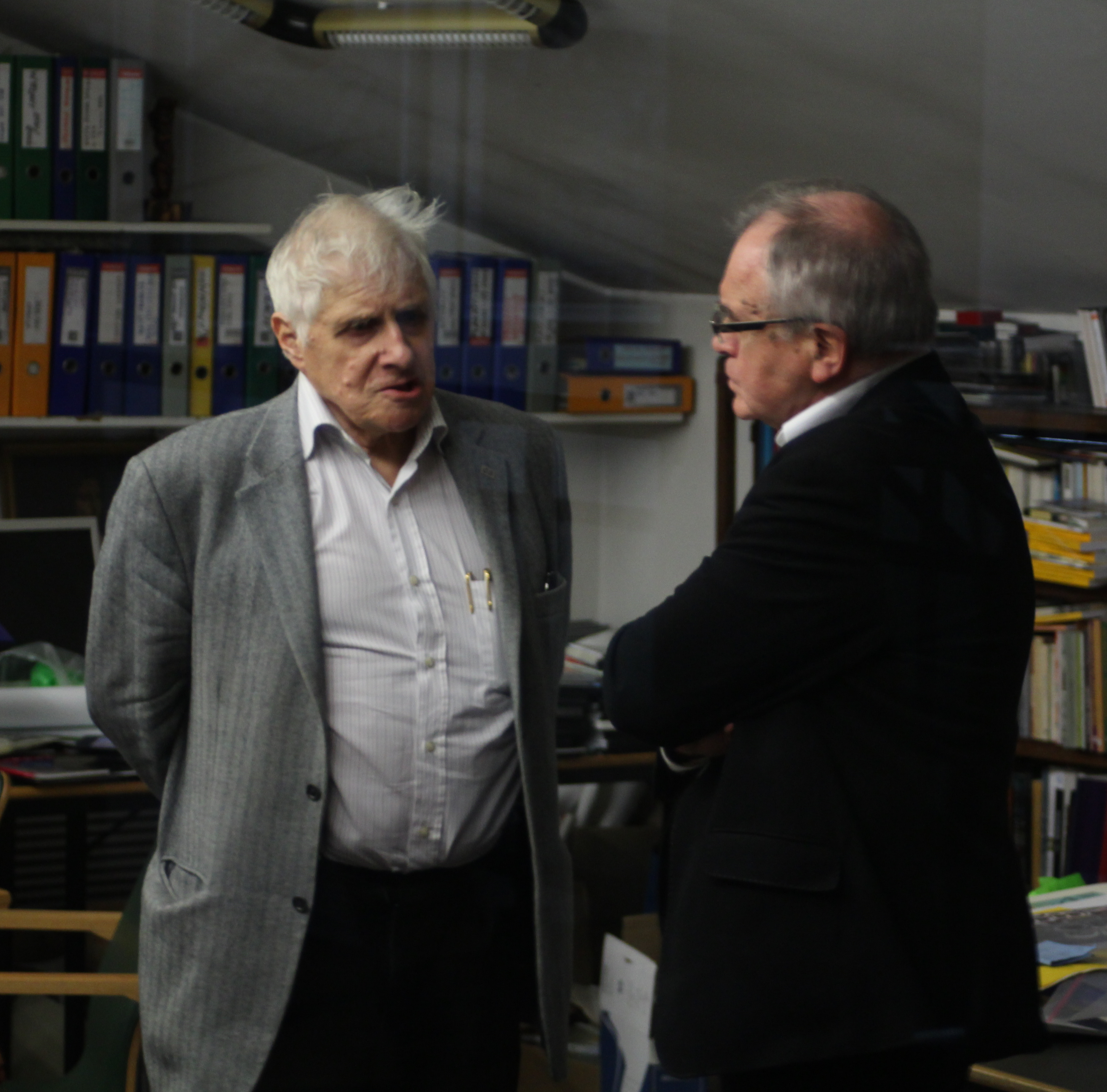
Tadeusz Lubelski (right) in conversation with Jerzy Vetulani, 2014

In 2006, he was elected a member of the European Film Academy. He is a member of the Committee on Art Sciences of the Polish Academy of Sciences, in 2007–2011 he was its chairman. Since 2011 he has been a member of the Central Commission for Degrees and Titles.

He is a member of the Scientific Council of the Institute of Art of the Polish Academy of Sciences and the Scientific Council of the Polish Biographical Dictionary, as well as the Board of the Independent Section of Film Literature by the Polish Filmmakers Association. In the years 1995–2001 and 2006 he was the Programme Director of the Kraków Film Festival, and then chaired the Programme Council of this Festival. From 1995, he was the chairman of the jury of the National Film Knowledge Competition for Youth High Schools in Poland.

He specializes in the history of Polish film and in the history of European cinematography, especially French cinema. He is the editor of the first Polish thematic Encyklopedia kina (Encyclopedia of the Cinema; 1st edition – 2003, 2nd edition – 2010) and co-editor of the comprehensive series Historia kina (The History of Cinema), composed of four volumes: on the silent film (2009), the classical film (2011), the New Wave film (2015), and the film of the end of the century (2019).

In a 2015 survey carried out by the Film Museum in Łódź he pointed to 8½ by Federico Fellini as the greatest film ever made; and to How Far Away, How Near by Tadeusz Konwicki as the greatest Polish film ever made.

== Selected works ==
- Poetyka powieści i filmów Tadeusza Konwickiego (1984)
- Strategie autorskie w polskim filmie fabularnym lat 1945–1961 (1992, second edition 2000)
- Kino Krzysztofa Kieślowskiego (1997)
- Nowa Fala. O pewnej przygodzie kina francuskiego (2000)
- Encyklopedia kina (2003) – editor
- Odwieczne od nowa. Wielkie tematy w kinie przełomu wieków (2004)
- Zdjęcia: Jerzy Lipman (2005) – editor
- Historia kina polskiego (2006) – editor
- Wajda (2006)
- Historia kina polskiego. Twórcy, filmy, konteksty (2008)
- Historia kina. Tom 1. Kino nieme (2009) – editor, with Rafał Syska and Iwona Sowińska
- Historia kina. Tom 2. Kino klasyczne (2011) – editor, with Rafał Syska and Iwona Sowińska
- Historia niebyła kina PRL (2012)
- Historia kina. Tom 3. Kino epoki nowofalowej (2015) – editor, with Rafał Syska and Iwona Sowińska
- Historia kina. Tom 4. Kino końca wieku (2019) – editor, with Rafał Syska and Iwona Sowińska

== Awards ==
- Award of the Minister of National Education of Poland (2002)
- Kraków Book of the Month Award for Encyklopedia kina (December 2003)
- Award of the Polish Film Institute for the best film book of the year for the book Historia kina polskiego. Twórcy, filmy, konteksty (2009)
- Bolesław Michałek Award for the best film book of the year 2011–2012 for the book Historia niebyła kina PRL
- Nomination for the Nike Award for the book Historia niebyła kina PRL (2013)
