= I Feel Bad =

2018 American comedy television series

- Genre: Sitcom
- Created by: Aseem Batra
- Based on: I Feel Bad: All Day. Every Day. About Everything by Orli Auslander
- Starring: Sarayu Blue; Paul Adelstein; Madhur Jaffrey; Brian George; James Buckley; Zach Cherry; Johnny Pemberton
- Composer: Mateo Messina
- Country of origin: United States
- Original language: English
- No. of seasons: 1
- No. of episodes: 13

Production
- Executive producers: Joshua D. Maurer; Dave Becky; Aseem Batra; Amy Poehler; Julie Anne Robinson
- Producers: Kelly Pancho; Kim Lessing; Rupinder Gill; Scott Printz
- Cinematography: Tim Suhrstedt; Tom Magill
- Editors: Shawn Paper; Mat Greenleaf; Myron Kerstein
- Camera setup: Single-camera
- Running time: 22 minutes
- Production companies: Paper Kite Productions; 3 Arts Entertainment; CannyLads Productions; Seemu! Inc.; Eitzblit Films; Universal Television

Original release
- Network: NBC
- Release: September 19 – December 27, 2018

I Feel Bad is an American sitcom, based on the book I Feel Bad: All Day. Every Day. About Everything by Orli Auslander, that premiered on September 19, 2018, on NBC. It stars Sarayu Blue, Paul Adelstein, Aisling Bea, Zach Cherry, Johnny Pemberton, and James Buckley and is executive produced by Aseem Batra, Julie Anne Robinson, Amy Poehler, Dave Becky, and Joshua D. Maurer. In November 2018, it was announced that the series would conclude on December 27, 2018 and that NBC would make a decision regarding a potential renewal at a later date. In May 2019, the series was canceled after one season.

== Premise ==
I Feel Bad follows Emet, a wife, mother, and career woman who "feels bad" when she deviates from her own standards of perfection while trying to "have it all."

== Cast and characters ==
=== Main ===
- Sarayu Blue as Emet Kamala-Sweetzer
- Paul Adelstein as David Sweetzer, Emet's husband
- Madhur Jaffrey as Maya Kamala, Emet's mother
- Brian George as Sonny Kamala, Emet's father
- James Buckley as Chewey, Emet's co-worker
- Zach Cherry as Norman, Emet's co-worker
- Johnny Pemberton as Griff, Emet's co-worker

=== Recurring ===
- Lily Rose Silver as Lily, Emet and David's eldest child.
- Rahm Braslaw as Louie, Emet and David's middle child. In the pilot episode the character was portrayed by Callan Farris.

=== Guest ===
- Aisling Bea as Simone ("I Don't Want to Turn into My Mother"), Emet's best friend since college. The character was written out of the series following the pilot episode.
- Christopher Avila as Hux ("I Don't Want to Turn into My Mother"), Emet's co-worker. The character was written out of the series following the pilot episode.
- Easton Magliarditi as Tucker ("I Don't Want to Turn into My Mother")
- Jane Seymour as Chewey's Mom
- Debra Jo Rupp as Griff's Mom
- Parker Young as Damon Paul, Emet's boss
- Alfred Molina as Max, Adam's Father
- Caroline Aaron as Irene, Adam's Mother
- Taylor Misiak as Mackenzie ("I Get Sick of Being Needed")
- MYTEEN as Themself ("We're Not Fun Anymore")

== Episodes ==
No.	Title	Directed by	Written by	Original release date	Prod. code	U.S. viewers (millions)
1	"I Don't Want to Turn into My Mother"	Julie Anne Robinson	Aseem Batra	September 19, 2018	101	5.72
2	"I Get Sick of Being Needed"	Tristram Shapeero	Andy Bobrow	September 19, 2018	103	3.98
3	"I Lie to My Kids"	Julie Anne Robinson	Annie Weisman	October 4, 2018	102	2.64
4	"My Kid Has to Grow Up"	Maggie Carey	Claudia Lonow	October 11, 2018	106	2.21
5	"I'm Vain A.F."	Linda Mendoza	Mathew Harawitz	October 18, 2018	104	2.20
6	"I'm a Massive Hypocrite"	Julie Anne Robinson	Teri Schaffer & Raynelle Swilling	October 25, 2018	105	2.09
7	"I'm Not Sentimental"	Alex Reid	Rupinder Gill	November 1, 2018	107	2.23
8	"I Miss Important Moments"	Julie Anne Robinson	Nicole Sun	November 15, 2018	108	1.84
9	"I Need My Mom"	Rebecca Asher	Julian Kiani	November 29, 2018	109	1.74
10	"My Kids Barely Know Their Culture"	Michael Spiller	Anthony Gioe & Nick Mandernach	December 6, 2018	110	1.78
11	"We're Not Fun Anymore"	Phil Traill	Aseem Batra & Krystal Banzon	December 13, 2018	111	1.86
12	"I Don't Know My Dad"	Ken Whittingham	Aseem Batra & Brian Ashburn	December 27, 2018	112	2.48
13	"There's Never Enough Time"	Julie Anne Robinson	Aseem Batra	December 27, 2018	113	1.93

== Production ==
=== Development ===
On February 2, 2018, it was announced that NBC had given the production a pilot order. The pilot episode was written by Aseem Batra based on the book I Feel Bad: All Day. Every Day. About Everything by Orli Auslander. Batra also acts an executive producer alongside Amy Poehler, Julie Anne Robinson, Dave Becky, and Joshua D. Maurer. Kelly Pancho and Kim Lessing are set as producers and Orli Auslander as a consulting producer. Production companies involved with the pilot include Universal Television, Paper Kite Productions, CannyLads Productions, and 3 Arts Entertainment.

On May 8, 2018, it was announced that NBC had given the production a series order. A few days later, it was announced that the series would premiere in the fall of 2018 and air on Thursdays at 9:30 p.m. On June 19, 2018, it was announced that the series would officially premiere on October 4, 2018 in its regular time-slot. On November 8, 2018, it was announced that the series would "conclude" in December 2018 and that NBC would make a decision regarding a potential renewal at a later date. On May 10, 2019, NBC canceled the series after one season.

=== Casting ===
On February 26, 2018, it was announced that Sarayu Blue and Paul Adelstein had been cast as the pilot's female and male leads, respectively. In March 2018, it was announced that Zach Cherry and James Buckley had also joined the main cast.

== Release ==
=== Marketing ===
On May 13, 2018, NBC released the first official trailer for the series.

=== Premiere ===
On September 10, 2018, the series took part in the 12th annual PaleyFest Fall Television Previews, which featured a preview screening of the series and a conversation with cast members Sarayu Blue, Paul Adelstein, Madhur Jaffrey, and Brian George and executive producers Aseem Batra and Julie Anne Robinson.

== Reception ==
=== Critical response ===
The series has been met with a mixed to negative response from critics upon its premiere. On the review aggregation website Rotten Tomatoes, the series holds an approval rating of 31% with an average rating of 5.06 out of 10, based on 16 reviews. The website's critical consensus reads, "Despite its promising pedigree, I Feel Bad simply isn't very funny." Metacritic, which uses a weighted average, assigned the series a score of 55 out of 100 based on 9 critics, indicating "mixed or average reviews".

=== Ratings ===
Viewership and ratings per episode of I Feel Bad
No.	Title	Air date	Rating/share (18–49)	Viewers (millions)	DVR (18–49)	DVR viewers (millions)	Total (18–49)	Total viewers (millions)
1	"I Don't Want to Turn into My Mother"	September 19, 2018	1.1/5	5.72	0.3	1.09	1.4	6.81
2	"I Get Sick of Being Needed"	September 19, 2018	0.8/3	3.98	0.2	0.94	1.0	4.92
3	"I Lie to My Kids"	October 4, 2018	0.7/3	2.64	0.3	1.04	1.0	3.68
4	"My Kid Has to Grow Up"	October 11, 2018	0.5/2	2.21	0.3	0.86	0.8	3.06
5	"I’m Vain A.F."	October 18, 2018	0.6/3	2.20	0.2	0.75	0.8	2.95
6	"I'm a Massive Hypocrite"	October 25, 2018	0.5/2	2.09	0.3	0.75	0.8	2.84
7	"I'm Not Sentimental"	November 1, 2018	0.5/2	2.23	0.3	0.81	0.8	3.04
8	"I Miss Important Moments"	November 15, 2018	0.5/2	1.84	0.3	0.79	0.8	2.63
9	"I Need My Mom"	November 29, 2018	0.4/2	1.74	0.3	0.75	0.7	2.49
10	"My Kids Barely Know Their Culture"	December 6, 2018	0.4/2	1.78	—N/a	0.73	—N/a	2.51
11	"We're Not Fun Anymore"	December 13, 2018	0.4/2	1.86	0.2	0.60	0.6	2.46
12	"I Don't Know My Dad"	December 27, 2018	0.5/2	2.48	0.2	0.47	0.7	2.95
13	"There's Never Enough Time"	December 27, 2018	0.4/2	1.93	0.2	0.51	0.6	2.44
