= Yagnam (1991 film) =

- Directed by: Gutha Ramineedu
- Written by: Kalipatnam Ramarao
- Produced by: Vuppunuthula Purushotham Reddy
- Starring: Bhanu Chander; P. L. Narayana
- Release date: 1991
- Country: India
- Language: Telugu

Yagnam (English: The Offering) is a 1991 Indian Telugu-language social problem film directed by Gutha Ramineedu based on a 1964 play by Kalipatnam Ramarao. The film has garnered the National Film Award for Best Supporting Actor, and the Nandi Award for Best Feature Film. The film won two Nandi Awards.

== Plot ==
The film deals with the life of a poor farmer (P. L. Narayana) and his dysfunctional family. The farmer sacrifices his own son (Bhanu Chander) as an offering to overcome his debt.

== Awards ==
National Film Awards

- National Film Award for Best Supporting Actor - P. L. Narayana

Nandi Awards

- Best Feature Film - Gold - Gutha Ramineedu
- Second Best Story Writer - Kalipatnam Ramarao
