= Happyish =

American dark satirical comedy-drama series

- Genre: Dark comedy; Comedy drama; Satire
- Created by: Shalom Auslander
- Written by: Shalom Auslander
- Starring: Steve Coogan; Kathryn Hahn; Bradley Whitford; Ellen Barkin; Hannah Hodson
- Country of origin: United States
- Original language: English
- No. of seasons: 1
- No. of episodes: 10

Production
- Executive producers: Shalom Auslander; Ken Kwapis; Alexandra Beattie
- Camera setup: Single-camera
- Running time: 30 minutes
- Production companies: In Cahoots; Showtime Networks

Original release
- Network: Showtime
- Release: April 5 – June 28, 2015

Happyish (stylized as HAPPYish) is an American dark satirical comedy-drama television show created and written by Shalom Auslander and starring Steve Coogan, Kathryn Hahn, Bradley Whitford, Ellen Barkin and Hannah Hodson. Ken Kwapis helped develop the program and directed its pilot and three of the first season's episodes. It first aired on Showtime on April 5, 2015, as a sneak preview, before its official premiere on April 26, 2015. On July 24, 2015, Happyish was cancelled by Showtime due to low ratings.

== Synopsis ==
Thom Payne (Steve Coogan), a depressed middle-aged man, is confronted with new, younger bosses at the New York City advertising firm to which he commutes from Woodstock, New York. Thom's pursuit of happiness is seriously compromised and he finds he must content himself with feeling "happyish." His wife, Lee (Kathryn Hahn), is an artist who angrily struggles with balancing her work and motherhood.

== Development and production ==
Shalom Auslander first pitched the show, then titled Pigs in Shit, to Showtime in fall 2011, and spent more than a year trying to get Philip Seymour Hoffman on board to play the lead character. Auslander has said that Hoffman expressed interest in the show from the start, but the casting was held up due to "endless lawyering." A pilot was shot with Hoffman in the lead role, but after his death on February 2, 2014, it appeared that the project would be discontinued. David Nevins, President of Showtime, came to Auslander in summer 2014, and broached the idea of finding a new star. Names including John C. Reilly, Steve Carell, Will Ferrell, Edward Norton, Woody Harrelson and Kevin Kline were considered until Steve Coogan signed on for the lead role in October 2014.

Filming for the new pilot took place in Woodstock, New York from December 9–11, 2014. Part of the pilot was filmed at a house in the Byrdcliffe Art Colony, and additional locations were scouted in the neighborhood. Exterior shots were filmed at the "Welcome to Woodstock" sign on Route 212, Taco Juan's, the Golden Notebook, and at the Woodstock Library. After it was picked up to series by Showtime, filming was moved to New York City, but the crew returned to Woodstock around Christmas time to film the remaining exterior shots for the rest of the series.

On January 12, 2015, Showtime announced the series pickup of Happyish, exactly one year after it was originally announced at a Television Critics Association session in 2014. Showtime announced the series would premiere on April 26, 2015. However, the series premiered as a sneak preview on April 5, 2015. The series finale aired on June 28, 2015.

== Episodes ==
No.	Title	Directed by	Written by	Original release date	U.S. viewers (millions)
1	"Starring Samuel Beckett, Albert Camus and Alois Alzheimer"	Ken Kwapis	Shalom Auslander	April 5, 2015	0.430
2	"Starring Marc Chagall, Abuela and Adolf Hitler"	Ken Kwapis	Shalom Auslander	May 3, 2015	0.237
3	"Starring Vladimir Nabokov, Hippocrates and God"	Ken Kwapis	Shalom Auslander	May 10, 2015	0.208
4	"Starring Sigmund Freud, Charles Bukowski and Seven Billion Assholes"	Gail Mancuso	Shalom Auslander	May 17, 2015	0.262
5	"Starring Josey Wales, Jesus Christ and The New York Times"	Gail Mancuso	Shalom Auslander	May 24, 2015	0.343
6	"Starring Helen Keller, Moses and Lenny Bruce"	Ken Whittingham	Shalom Auslander	May 31, 2015	0.250
7	"Starring David Ogilvy, Anton Chekhov and Gluten Enteropathy"	Andrew McCarthy	Shalom Auslander	June 7, 2015	0.229
8	"Starring Rene Descartes, Adweek and HRH The Princess of Arendelle"	Ken Whittingham	Shalom Auslander	June 14, 2015	0.224
9	"Starring Mr. Mike, Joseph McCarthy and Alfred Bernhard Nobel"	Jesse Peretz	Shalom Auslander	June 21, 2015	0.197
10	"Starring Christopher Hitchens, Philip Larkin and Josef Stalin"	Ken Kwapis	Shalom Auslander	June 28, 2015	0.261

== Reception ==
Happyish received mixed reviews. It has a score of 49 out of 100 based on 31 reviews on Metacritic. Rotten Tomatoes gave the show a 30% 'rotten' rating based on 37 critic reviews, with the critical consensus "Instead of sly and shocking, Happyish comes off as shrill and self-satisfied, despite the efforts of its talented cast."
