= Richard Lloyd Parry =

British foreign correspondent and writer

- Richard Lloyd Parry in Tokyo, September 2026
- Born: Southport
- Occupations: Journalist, author
- Notable work: In The Time of Madness

Richard Lloyd Parry (born 1969) is a British foreign correspondent and writer. He is the Asia Editor of The Times of London, based in Tokyo, and is the author of the non-fiction books In the Time of Madness, People Who Eat Darkness: The Fate of Lucie Blackman, and Ghosts of the Tsunami, as well as the 2025 novel In the Green Heart.

== Early life ==
He was born in Southport, Lancashire, and was educated at Merchant Taylors' School, Crosby and Oxford University. His interest in the Far East was sparked by a trip to Japan in 1986 that was awarded to him as a prize when he appeared on the UK TV quiz show Blockbusters.

== Career in journalism ==
In 1995, he became Tokyo correspondent of the British newspaper The Independent and began reporting from other countries in Asia. In 1998 he covered the fall of President Suharto in Indonesia, and the violence which followed the independence referendum in East Timor. In 2002, he moved to The Times. Altogether he has worked in twenty-seven countries, including Afghanistan, Iraq, North Korea, Papua New Guinea, Vietnam, Kosovo and Macedonia.

While covering the aftermath of the invasion of Afghanistan in November 2001, he recovered a pair of Osama bin-Laden's underpants from a residential compound near the city of Jalalabad. The following month he was one of a small group of reporters to travel to the village of Kama Ado, south of Jalalabad, which had been destroyed, along with its inhabitants, by a US Air Force attack – despite claims by the Pentagon that "nothing happened". His report was the inspiration for a song by the American singer-songwriter David Rovics.

In April 2003, he was the first to report that the rescue of Private Jessica Lynch, the US soldier reportedly rescued during the war against Saddam Hussein in Iraq, was not the heroic story told by the US military, but a staged operation that alarmed patients and the doctors who had struggled to save her life.

In November 2009, he was accused by a group of Thai politicians of the crime of lèse-majesté, or insulting the monarchy, over an interview which he conducted with the deposed Prime Minister of Thailand, Thaksin Shinawatra.

In September 2010, he and David McNeill of The Independent were briefly arrested in North Korea, after discovering a secret street market in the capital Pyongyang. The incident inspired a controversy on the website NK News. Lloyd Parry defended McNeill and himself from accusations that they misrepresented the situation in North Korea and put their local guides at risk of punishment.

== Books ==
Lloyd Parry has published three non-fiction books and one novel:

- In the Time of Madness was published in 2005. As well as presenting an eye-witness account of the events leading up to and following the end of the Suharto regime, it also dramatised the personal crisis of a young reporter, Lloyd Parry, facing the perils and excitements of death and violence. Lloyd Parry began visiting Indonesia in the late 1990s, and witnessed much of the violence that preceded and followed the fall of Suharto, including headhunting and cannibalism on the island of Borneo. In September 1999 when he was covering the referendum on independence in East Timor, he was one of a small group of journalists who took sanctuary in the United Nations compound in Dili as it was surrounded by murderous pro-Indonesia militiamen. The book describes how Lloyd Parry's early confidence quickly turned to fear, and his guilt and shame after escaping from East Timor on an Australian evacuation flight. "I imagined that these experiences had imparted something to my character, an invisible shell which would stand me in good stead", he wrote. "But then I went to East Timor, where I discovered that such experience is never externalised, only absorbed, and that it builds up inside one, like a toxin. In East Timor, I became afraid, and couldn't control my fear. I ran away, and afterwards I was ashamed."
- People Who Eat Darkness: The Fate of Lucie Blackman was published in February 2011 and tells the story of a young British woman who was killed and dismembered in Japan in 2000; of the man accused of killing her, Joji Obara; of the controversial involvement of her family in the effort to find her; and of the ten-year-long trial which followed. During Lloyd Parry's lengthy reporting of the case, Obara unsuccessfully sued him for libel in a Tokyo court. Although it was impossible to make a direct link to Obara, Lloyd Parry also received a mysterious package containing covertly taken surveillance photographs of him, and a document encouraging members of Japan's ultra-nationalist right wing to "deal with" him for his reporting of the Japanese imperial family. Before publication, the book received praise from novelists Chris Cleave, Mo Hayder, Julie Myerson, David Peace and Minette Walters. It was described by Blake Morrison in The Guardian as "a compelling book, 10 years in the making, rich in intelligence and insight." Kirkus Reviews called the book "a fresh, compelling read for fans of true crime and slowly unfolding mysteries."
- Ghosts of the Tsunami: Death and Life in Japan's Disaster Zone was published in 2017.
- In the Green Heart, Lloyd Parry’s first novel, was published in 2025.

== Weblog ==
Lloyd Parry also contributes a weblog to The Times website, entitled Asia Exile.

== Awards and honours ==
- 2005 What The Papers Say Awards, Foreign Correspondent of the Year
- 2006 Dolman Best Travel Book Award, shortlist for In the Time of Madness
- 2011 Samuel Johnson Prize, longlist for People Who Eat Darkness
- 2012 Orwell Prize, shortlist for People Who Eat Darkness
- 2018 Folio Prize, winner for Ghosts of the Tsunami
