= Bharia =

Bharia may refer to:

- Bhariati, a language of Madhya Pradesh, India
- Bharia people, tribal people of Madhya Pradesh, India

== See also ==
- Bahria (disambiguation)
- Bharya (disambiguation)
