= Bahria =

Bahria may refer to:

- Several establishments of the Pakistan Navy
  - Bahria Foundation
  - Bahria University
  - Bahria Schools and Colleges
- Bahria Town, private real-estate company

== See also ==
- Bharia (disambiguation)
- Bahr (disambiguation)
- Bahr (toponymy), a component of Arabic placenames meaning "sea" or "large river"
- Bahri, Arabic name
