= Ghosts of the Tsunami =

2017 nonfiction book written by Richard Lloyd Parry

Ghosts of the Tsunami: Death and Life in Japan's Disaster Zone
- First edition (UK)
- Author: Richard Lloyd Parry
- Publisher: Jonathan Cape (UK); MCD (US)
- Publication date: 31 August 2017
- Pages: 352
- ISBN: 978-0-374-25397-4 (Hardcover)

Ghosts Of The Tsunami: Death and Life in Japan's Disaster Zone is a 2017 non-fiction book written by Richard Lloyd Parry, an English reporter who lived in Japan and reported about events there for years before the 2011 Japanese tsunami, in particular, the fatal decision-making leading to the drowning of the 74 students and 10 teachers of Ogawa Elementary School (石巻市立大川小学校). In this book, Parry examines and recounts the devastating impact of the 2011 tsunami on Japanese survivors, communities and society at large, including years later. "It's a...chronicle of a disaster that, six years later, still seems incomprehensible."

== Awards and honours ==
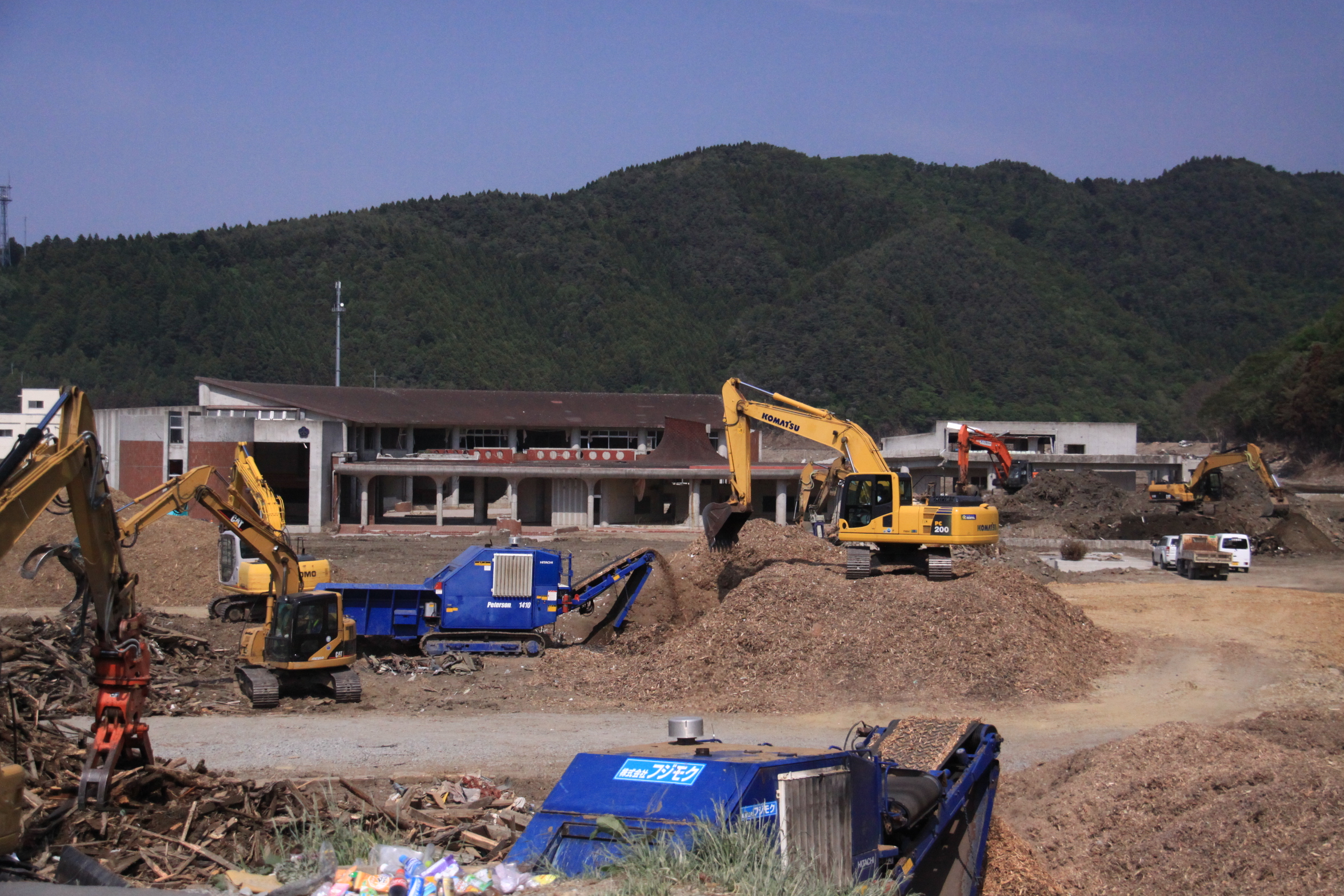
Okawa Elementary School after the tsunami, the focus of the book.

- 2018 Folio Prize
