= The Topeka School =

2019 novel by Ben Lerner

- First edition cover
- Author: Ben Lerner
- Audio read by: Peter Berkrot; Nancy Linari; Tristan Wright
- Language: English
- Genre: Bildungsroman
- Set in: Topeka, Kansas in the 1990s
- Publisher: FSG Originals
- Publication date: October 1, 2019
- Publication place: United States
- Media type: Print (Hardcover)
- Pages: 304
- ISBN: 978-0-374-27778-9
- OCLC: 1080555801
- Dewey Decimal: 813/.6
- LC Class: PS3612.E68 T63 2019

The Topeka School is a 2019 novel by the American novelist and poet Ben Lerner about a high school debate champion from Topeka, Kansas in the 1990s. The book is considered both a bildungsroman and a work of autofiction, as the narrative incorporates many details from Lerner's own life. The novel was a finalist for the 2020 Pulitzer Prize for Fiction.

== Background ==
As in Lerner's previous novels, the narrative contains autobiographical elements. Like the protagonist, Adam Gordon, Lerner grew up in Topeka and won a national debate championship in high school, and like Adam's mother Jane in the novel, Lerner's mother, Harriet Lerner, is a psychologist who has published best-selling books aimed at a non-academic audience. Critics Rumaan Alam and Christine Smallwood have referred to the book as an example of autofiction.

== Plot summary ==
The novel is set primarily in Topeka, Kansas, in the late 1990s, and is told mainly from the perspective of three characters: Adam Gordon, a high school debate champion, and his parents Jane and Jonathan, who are psychologists at a local institution known as the Foundation. In a nonlinear narrative, the novel explores Adam's preparation for a national debate championship (which he wins), his relationship with his girlfriend Amber, and his parents' lives. One of Adam's classmates, Darren Eberheart, a social misfit and patient of Adam's father, also features in a sequence of shorter chapters that culminates in him seriously injuring a girl at a party who rejected his romantic advances after years of bullying by his peers. The final chapter takes place in 2019 and follows Adam, now a father of two young girls, as he and his wife take their family to Topeka from their home in New York City to give a reading of Adam's work. Back in New York City, they attend a protest of the Trump administration's family separation policy.

== Reception ==
Writing for The Paris Review, Nikki Shaner-Bradford praised Lerner's prose. Christine Smallwood, writing for Harper's Magazine, referred to Lerner as a "supremely gifted prose stylist, at once theoretical and conversational." Garth Risk Hallberg in The New York Times Book Review acclaimed the novel as "a high-water mark in recent American fiction."

The book was named one of the top ten books of 2019 by both The New York Times Book Review and The Washington Post.

== Themes ==
Lerner describes The Topeka School as about, among other things, "a violent identity crisis among white men" in the 1990s that prefigured the election of Donald Trump in 2016. One of the primary conflicts of the novel is between the prevailing political centrism and "end of history" rhetoric of the time, accepted largely unthinkingly by Adam and his cosmopolitan parents, and an undercurrent of right-wing anger voiced in its most extreme form by the protests of the Topeka-based Westboro Baptist Church. Critics have also noted the themes of toxic masculinity (especially in the Darren subplot) and the breakdown of language as a medium of communication, epitomized by the debating technique of "the spread", wherein a debater tries to overwhelm their opponent with as many arguments as possible regardless of their merit.

== Awards and honors ==
Year	Award	Result	Ref.
2019	Los Angeles Times Book Prize for Fiction	Won	
2019	National Book Critics Circle Award for Fiction	Shortlisted	
2020	Folio Prize	Shortlisted	
2020	Orwell Prize for Political Fiction	Longlisted	
2020	Pulitzer Prize for Fiction	Shortlisted	
