= Leaving the Atocha Station =

2011 debut novel by American poet and critic Ben Lerner

- First edition
- Author: Ben Lerner
- Language: English
- Genre: Novel
- Publisher: Coffee House Press
- Publication date: 2011
- Publication place: United States
- Media type: Print Paperback
- Pages: 181
- ISBN: 978-1-56689-274-2
- Dewey Decimal: 813/.6—DC23
- LC Class: PS3612.E68L43 2011

Leaving the Atocha Station (2011) is the debut novel by American poet and critic Ben Lerner. It won the 2011 Believer Book Award.

== Story ==
The first-person narrator of the novel, Adam Gordon, is an American poet in his early 20s participating in a prestigious fellowship in Madrid circa 2004. The stated goal of his fellowship is to write a long narrative poem highlighting literature's role in the Spanish Civil War. Gordon, however, spends his time reading Tolstoy, smoking spliffs, and observing himself observing his surroundings. He also pursues romantic and sexual relationships with two Spanish women, lying to them and others to elicit sympathy and avoid responsibility. He tells several people that his mother has recently died, recounts a friend's experience of a failed attempt to rescue a drowned woman as if it was his own, and uses his (sometimes feigned) lack of Spanish fluency to falsely suggest that his thoughts are too profound and complex to convey outside of his native language. Especially when called upon to participate in poetry readings or discussion panels, Gordon grapples with feelings of fraudulence and anxiety.

Leaving the Atocha Station can be read as a Künstlerroman. However, Lerner has said:

The protagonist doesn't unequivocally undergo a dramatic transformation, for instance, but rather the question of "transformation" is left open, and people seem to have strong and distinct senses about whether the narrator has grown or remained the same, whether this is a sort of coming of age story or whether it charts a year in the life of a sociopath.

The mentioned station is Madrid Atocha railway station.

== References to Ashbery ==
The title of the novel is taken from a John Ashbery poem of the same name published in The Tennis Court Oath.

During his time in Spain, Gordon often carries Ashbery's Selected Poems. At one point in the novel, Gordon reads a selection from Selected Poems. "The best Ashbery poems, I thought, although not in these words, describe what it's like to read an Ashbery poem."

Ashbery called Lerner's Leaving the Atocha Station "[a]n extraordinary novel about the intersections of art and reality in contemporary life."

== Critical reception ==
The New Statesman named it one of the best books of 2011. The New Yorker included it in its Reviewers' Favorites from 2011. Jonathan Franzen considered it one of his favorite books of the year.

It won the 2011 Believer Book Award and was shortlisted for the James Tait Black Memorial Prize.

== Bibliography ==
- Leaving the Atocha Station: A Novel. Coffee House Press. 2011. ISBN 9781566892926.
