= Shalom Auslander =

American writer

Shalom Auslander (born 1970) is an American novelist, memoirist, and essayist. He grew up in a strict Orthodox Jewish neighborhood of Monsey, New York, where he describes himself as having been "raised like a veal". His writing style is notable for its existentialist themes, biting satire and black humor. His nonfiction often draws comparisons to David Sedaris, while his fiction has drawn comparisons to Franz Kafka, Samuel Beckett, and Groucho Marx. His books have been translated into over a dozen languages and are published around the world.

== Early life and education ==
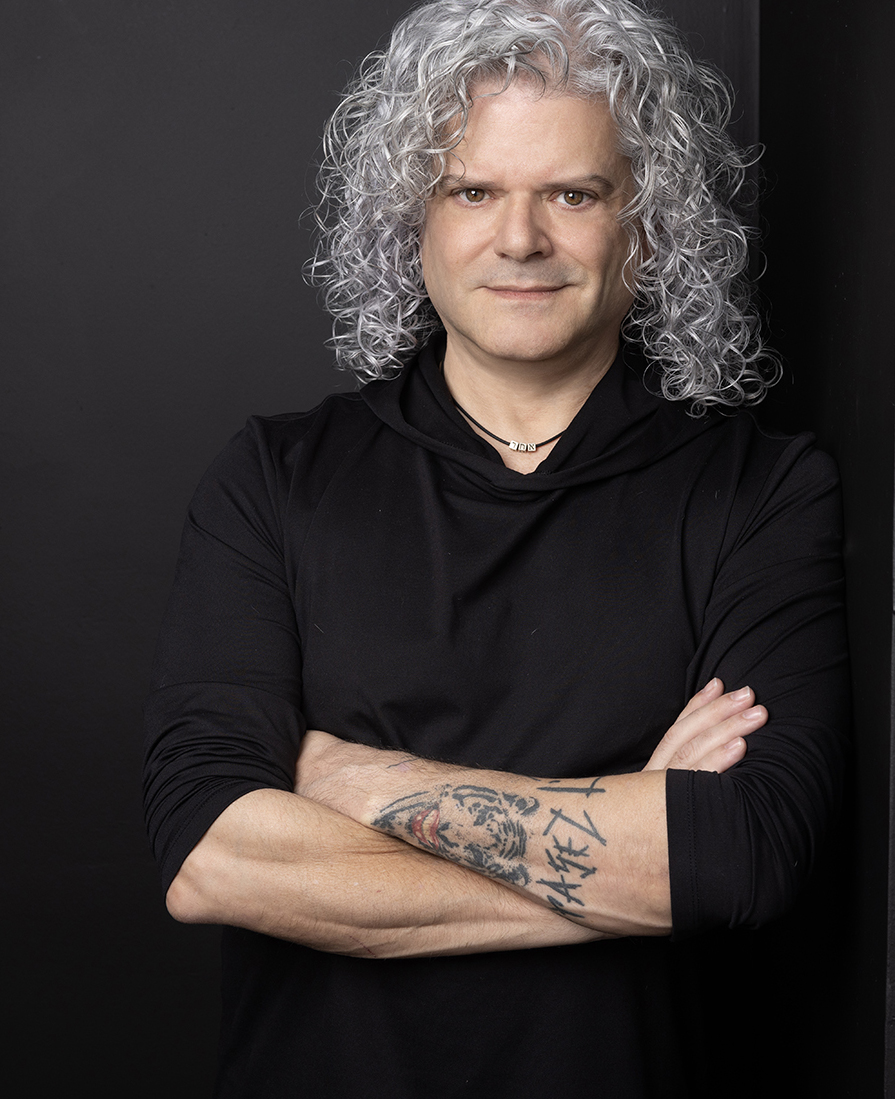
SHALOM AUSLANDER 2024

Auslander was born and raised in Monsey, and attended Yeshiva of Spring Valley for elementary school, and then high school at the Marsha Stern Talmudical Academy in Manhattan. His maternal uncles are Rabbi Norman Lamm, a former chancellor of Yeshiva University, and Rabbi Maurice Lamm, the spiritual leader of Beth Jacob in Los Angeles. In Foreskin's Lament, he calls them "Uncle Nathan" and "Uncle Mendel".

Auslander attended Queens College, City University of New York for four weeks before dropping out. He teaches at the JTS MFA writing program in association with Columbia University.

== Prose work ==
Auslander's work has been featured on Public Radio International's This American Life and in The New Yorker. He has also written for Esquire magazine, GQ, The New York Times, and many other publications.

Beware of God

Auslander's first book was a collection of short stories, Beware of God (2006), which was a finalist for the 2003–04 Koret Jewish Book Award for "Young Writer on Jewish Themes". Writer A. M. Homes called the book "the debut of the freshest voice in Jewish Literature since Philip Roth arrived on the scene." In The Guardian, Nicholas Lezard compared reading its 14 short stories to "drinking fourteen shots of vodka". Christopher Hitchens wrote, "Any enemy of the gods and the godly is a friend of mine—even this freak."

A film adaptation of the story "Somebody Up There Likes You" is in development.

Foreskin's Lament

Foreskin's Lament: A Memoir (2007) is about Auslander's early life in a strict religious and dysfunctional family and his journey away from it. In it, he writes about his mother, "who was the belle of the misery ball", and his father, who was angry and uncommunicative. As a child, Auslander went through the house and destroyed all the pornography he found. As an adult, he rebelled against his religious upbringing. Foreskin's Lament was named one of the 2007 New York Times Best Books of the Year. Entertainment Weekly wrote, "Even at his most rebellious, Portnoy-era Roth couldn't hold a candle to Shalom Auslander." A stage adaptation is in development in London.

Hope: A Tragedy

In 2012, Auslander published his first novel, Hope: A Tragedy, in which a homeowner in upstate New York finds an elderly, foul-mouthed Anne Frank hiding in his attic. It was a finalist for the 2013 Thurber Prize for American Humor and won the 2013 Jewish Quarterly-Wingate Prize.

In 2020, both American and British critics named Hope: A Tragedy "the funniest novel of the past decade". Upon retiring in 2022, British literary critic Andrew Holgate named it one of the 23 Best Books of his 23-year career.

Mother for Dinner

Auslander's next novel, Mother for Dinner, tells the story of a family of assimilated Cannibal-Americans tasked with consuming (as is their tradition) their deceased mother's body. Both The Sunday Times and The Economist named it a Best Novel of the Year. Publishers Weekly called it a "riotous dissection of cultural formation" and Booklist called it a "brilliant satire on tribalism". In the Wall Street Journal, Sam Sacks wrote: "Everyone has different ideas about what's funny, and for me, the gold standard is dark Jewish humor—the more masochistic and taboo, the better. This sort of joking is scarce today—cultural homogenization and the current moral panic over giving offense have turned it into something like samizdat—but at least we have Shalom Auslander." In the UK, the book received unanimous praise, with critic Stuart Kelly calling it a "work of genius". Its omission from the Booker Longlist prompted an op-ed in The Times to ask, "But why no Mother for Dinner by Shalom Auslander, which is funny, in bad taste and a satire of identity politics?"

FEH: A Memoir

In 2024, Auslander published FEH: A Memoir, which recounts his lifelong struggle with shame and self-loathing. FEH won the 2026 James Thurber Prize for American Humor and was a finalist for the National Jewish Book Award. The Times named it one of their "Best Non-Fiction Books of 2024."

David Sedaris wrote: "Huzzah for one of our most merciless humorists. Auslander's prose isn't just laudable, it's frightening."

In 2022, the Woolf Institute at Cambridge University, England awarded Auslander's essay on the life and work of Franz Kafka, "The Day Kafka Killed His iPhone", the Peter Gilbert Prize. The essay discusses Kafka's paradoxical need to be both involved in the world and removed from it to complete his work.

== TV/film ==
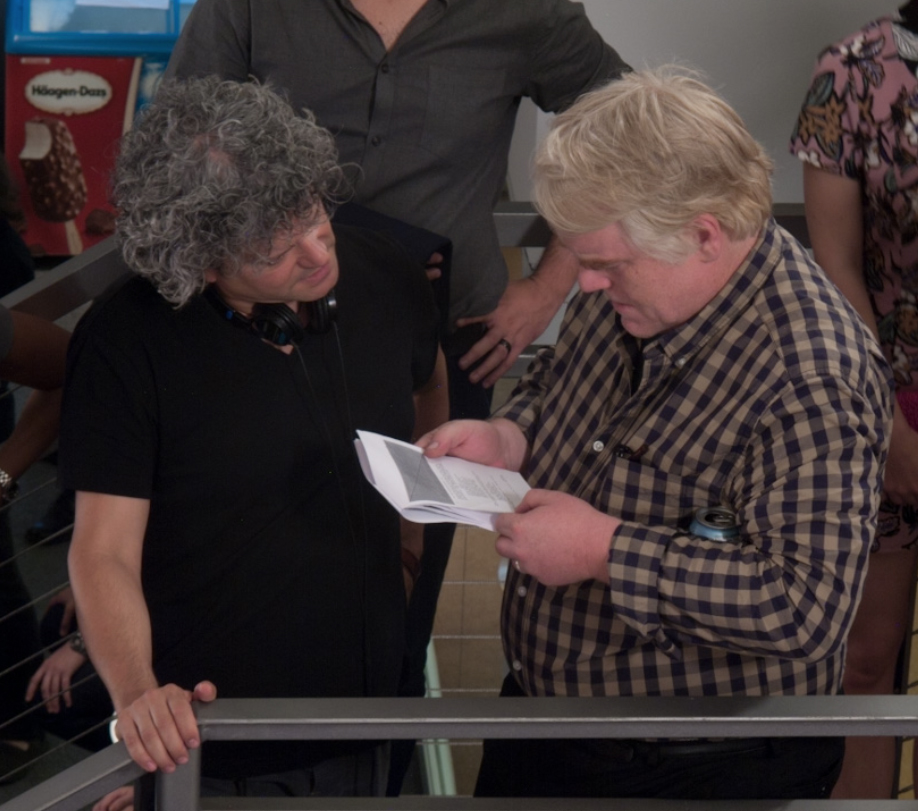
Shalom Auslander with Philip Seymour Hoffman on the set of Happyish

Auslander wrote and created the Showtime television program Happyish, which shot a pilot with Philip Seymour Hoffman, whom he met while adapting his novel Hope: A Tragedy for the screen. After Hoffman died in 2014, it appeared that the TV project would be discontinued, but it was recast with Steve Coogan in the lead role and premiered on April 5, 2015.

In 2021, Auslander began a YouTube series, "UNGODLY: Good Lessons from a Bad God", which reexamines the Bible with God (cruel, short-tempered, and vindictive) as the antagonist, "someone we should never be like". The series is in a chapter-and-verse format and Auslander intends to complete the Old and New Testaments.

== Personal life ==
Auslander is married to the artist and writer Orli Auslander. They have two children.

== Partial list of works ==
=== Books ===
- Foreskin's Lament: A Memoir
- Beware of God: Stories (2005)
- Hope: A Tragedy (2012)
- Mother for Dinner: A Novel (2020)
- Feh: A Memoir (2024)

=== Short stories / magazine articles ===
- The Los Angeles Times: This Year, God Should Atone to Us
- The New York Times: They Were Ordinary Germans, We Are Ordinary Americans
- The New Yorker: The Playoffs
- The New Yorker: Save Us
- The Guardian: Shalom Auslander's Top 10 Comic Tragedies
- The Guardian: Interview
- The 10 Types of Jew, Which One Are You?
- Washington Post Op Ed: Don't Compare Trump to Hitler (It Belittles Hitler)
- NPR, All Things Considered: The Groucho Letters
- Tablet: Consider The Ostrich
- The Los Angeles Times, Op-Ed: A Proud Fifth Columnist
- TLS: Book Review, "Hasidism, A New History"
- The New York Times: They Were Ordinary Germans. We are Ordinary Americans.
- Esquire: Dubious Achievement Awards 2000 (Esquire magazine, January 2001)

=== Interviews/readings ===
- Fresh Air with Terry Gross, interview from 2007-10-08
- Writer's Bloc with Dan Harmon
- Spoiler Story Festival with Alex Edelman and Etgar Keret
- Melbourne Jewish Book Festival, "American Jewish Humor with a Twist"
- 92nd Street Y Kafka Festival with Joshua Cohen, Vivian Gornick and Michael Shannon
- Death Camp Blues: from The Moth "Death Camp Blues"
- Shalom Auslander reads his true story, "The Blessing Bee." on This American Life
- Pretty Shitty Monkeys: An Interview with Shalom Auslander
- Jessa Crispin: An Interview with Shalom Auslander

=== Television shows ===
- Happyish (2015)

=== Video Series ===
- UnGodly
