= Harriet Lerner =

American psychologist

- Born: November 30, 1944 (age 81); Brooklyn, New York City, New York, U.S.
- Occupations: Clinical psychologist, author
- Known for: Contributions to feminist theory, family therapy, and psychoanalytic concepts
- Spouse: Steve Lerner
- Children: 2
- Website: harrietlerner.com

Harriet Lerner (born November 30, 1944), is a clinical psychologist best known for her contributions to psychoanalytic concepts regarding family and feminist theory and therapy, and for her many psychology books written for the general public. From 1972 to 2001, Lerner was a staff psychologist at the Menninger Clinic in Topeka, Kansas, and a faculty member and supervisor at the Karl Menninger School of Psychiatry. During this time she published extensively on the psychology of women and family relationships, revising traditional psychoanalytic concepts to reflect feminist and family systems perspectives.

== Early life and education ==
Lerner did her undergraduate work at the University of Wisconsin, where she received a government grant to study and pursue independent research in Delhi, India. She received her M.A. in Educational Psychology from Teachers College of Columbia University, and her Ph.D. in Clinical Psychology from The City University of New York. She did her pre-doctoral internship at Mount Zion Hospital in San Francisco, and completed her postdoctoral training at the Menninger Clinic, where she subsequently joined the staff.

== Writing ==
Lerner is best known for her general-audience books which provide a framework for understanding and improving family and work relationships.

Lerner has appeared in multiple podcasts, including Brene Brown's podcast, Unlocking Us, where the two discuss "How to Apologize & Why it Matters" in a 2020 two-episode special, based on Lerner's 2017 book, "Why Won't You Apologize?"

The Dance of Anger, a New York Times bestseller that has been translated into more than 35 foreign languages, was the first book published in the United States on the subject of women's anger. Women in Therapy is a compilation of her professional publications related to the psychology of women.

In addition to her scholarly work, she is a children's book author with her sister, Susan Goldhor.

=== Books ===
- The Dance of Anger, 1985, revised in 2005
- Women in Therapy, 1988
- The Dance of Intimacy, 1989
- The Dance of Deception, 1993
- Life Preservers, 1996
- The Mother Dance, 1998
- The Dance of Connection, 2001
- The Dance of Fear, 2004
- Marriage Rules, 2012
- Why Won't You Apologize, 2017

=== Children's books ===
- What’s So Terrible About Swallowing An Apple Seed?, 1996
- Franny B. Kranny, There’s a Bird in Your Hair!, 2001

== Personal life ==
Lerner is married to Steve Lerner, a psychologist and filmmaker, with whom she has two sons: Matt Lerner, the co-founder of Walk Score, and Ben Lerner, a writer and MacArthur Fellow.
