= Gwendoline Riley =

English writer

- Born: 1979 (age 46–47); London, England, United Kingdom
- Education: Manchester Metropolitan University
- Occupation: Novelist
- Writing career
- Period: 2002 - present
- Genre: Literary fiction
- Notable works: Cold Water (2002); First Love (2017); My Phantoms (2021)
- Notable awards: Betty Trask Award (2002); Somerset Maugham Award (2008); Geoffrey Faber Memorial Prize (2017); Windham-Campbell Prize (2026)

Gwendoline Riley FRSL (born 1979) is a British novelist and short story writer. She is the author of seven novels and one collection. Her novels have been awarded the Betty Trask Award, the Somerset Maugham Award, and the Geoffrey Faber Memorial Prize. In 2026, Riley was awarded the Windham-Campbell Prize.

== Early life and education ==
Riley was born in London in 1979. After her parents' divorce, she and her brother moved with their mother to Wirral, Merseyside, where they lived with Riley's maternal grandparents.

She studied English Literature at Manchester Metropolitan University.

== Career ==
After graduating from university, Riley worked briefly as an editor for the Manchester magazine CityLife. She then worked on and off in a bar for eight years while writing and living on literary grants.

Riley's first novel, Cold Water, written while she was still at university, was published in January 2002. It was named one of the five outstanding debut novels of 2002 by The Guardian "Weekend" magazine, and also won a Betty Trask Award for writers under the age of 35.

Sick Notes followed in 2004 and Joshua Spassky in 2007. For Cold Water and Sick Notes, the drama unfolds in Manchester, occasionally extending to different areas of Lancashire. Joshua Spassky, however, is set in Asheville, North Carolina, United States — the town where Zelda Fitzgerald died in a fire at the Highland Hospital. Joshua Spassky won the 2008 Somerset Maugham Award for writers under the age of 35 and was shortlisted for the 2007 John Llewellyn Rhys Prize, also for writers under the age of 35.

Her fourth novel, Opposed Positions, was published in May 2012.

Her fifth novel, First Love, was published in February 2017 and was shortlisted for the Baileys Women's Prize for Fiction, the Gordon Burn Prize, the Goldsmiths Prize, the Dylan Thomas Prize for writers under the age of 40 and the James Tait Black Memorial Prize. It won the Geoffrey Faber Memorial Prize for writers under the age of 40.

In June 2018, Riley was elected Fellow of the Royal Society of Literature in its "40 Under 40" initiative.

Her sixth novel, My Phantoms, published in 2021, was shortlisted for the Folio Prize. The novel follows the difficult relationships between Bridget and her parents, both as a child and an adult. The Guardian praised it as "a brilliant portrait of a mother-daughter relationship in which every encounter is a battle" and noted that "in all its horrible, funny, uncomfortable truthfulness, it feels increasingly like a complicated act of love". The Times Literary Supplement said that "her icy evocations of dysfunction and distress are unforgettable" and noted the "overwhelming sense of sorrow for the phantoms that haunt Bridget's life".

Her seventh novel, The Palm House, was published in 2026. The Guardian praised Riley's "phenomenal ear for dialogue" and called it "a slim, impeccably controlled story that contains multitudes". In July 2026, the novel was longlisted for The Booker Prize.

In 2026, Riley was awarded the US$175,000 Windham-Campbell Prize, given in recognition of a writer's whole body of work.

== Personal life ==
Riley lives in London.

== Selected works ==
=== Novels ===
- Cold Water (2002)
- Sick Notes (2004)
- Joshua Spassky (2007)
- Opposed Positions (2012)
- First Love (2017)
- My Phantoms (2021)
- The Palm House (2026)

=== Collection ===
- Tuesday Nights and Wednesday Mornings: A Novella and Stories (2004)

=== Critical studies and reviews of Riley's work ===
- Wood, James (13–20 February 2023). "Desperately normal : daughters outgrow their parent's in Gwendoline Riley's unsparing novels". The New Yorker. 99 (1): 87–89. (Note: Online version is titled "Daughters outgrow their parents in two unsparing novels".)

———————

== Awards and honours ==
- 2002 Betty Trask Award for Cold Water.
- 2007 shortlisted for the John Llewellyn Rhys Prize, for Joshua Spassky.
- 2008 Somerset Maugham Award, for Joshua Spassky.
- 2017 shortlisted for the Baileys Women's Prize for Fiction, for First Love.
- 2017 shortlisted for the Gordon Burn Prize, for First Love.
- 2017 shortlisted for the Goldsmiths Prize, for First Love.
- 2017 shortlisted for the Dylan Thomas Prize, for First Love.
- 2017 shortlisted for the James Tait Black Memorial Prize, for First Love.
- 2017 Geoffrey Faber Memorial Prize, for First Love.
- 2022 shortlisted for the Folio Prize, for My Phantoms.
- 2026 Windham-Campbell Prize.
- 2026 longlisted for the Booker Prize, for The Palm House.
