= Foreskin's Lament: A Memoir =

2007 book by Shalom Auslander

- Cover of first run hardcover edition
- Author: Shalom Auslander
- Language: English
- Genre: Memoir
- Publisher: Riverhead Hardcover
- Publication date: October 4, 2007
- Publication place: United States
- Pages: 320
- ISBN: 1-59448-955-6
- OCLC: 122425087
- Dewey Decimal: 813/.6 B 22
- LC Class: PS3601.U85 Z46 2007
- Preceded by: Beware of God: Stories (2005)

Foreskin's Lament: A Memoir is a book by Shalom Auslander. The book chronicles his upbringing as an ultra-Orthodox Jew, and his efforts to break free from it. Portions of the book have been featured in various media, including the PRI program This American Life.

== Critical reception ==
The Globe and Mail called the tome "humorous, but burdened", and said that "the book ably captures the strain between elements of Judaism". USA Today called it "edgy" and "bitterly funny". People magazine also called it "hilarious", and gave the book three-out-of-four stars. Regarding it as "one of its best memoirs", Time magazine called the memoir "blackly funny". More conservatively, Entertainment Weekly gave the book a B+, calling Auslander a "gifted writer", but concluding: "He's never going to find [something deep and rich in his problematic past] lunging after every sophomoric laugh."
