= Sarayu Rao =

American actress

Sarayu Blue
- Born: March 7, 1975 (age 51); Madison, Wisconsin, U.S.
- Other name: Sarayu Rao
- Education: University of Iowa (BA); American Conservatory Theater (MFA)
- Occupation: Actress
- Years active: 2002–present
- Spouse: Jonathan Blue
- Parents: Narayana Rao; Nidadavolu Malathi

Sarayu Blue (née Rao; born March 7, 1975), formerly known as Sarayu Rao, is an American actress. She is perhaps best known for her recurring role as Angela on the Fox sitcom Sons of Tucson, as well as Dr. Sydney Napur on David E. Kelley's Monday Mornings on TNT. She has also guest starred in a number of television series.

== Acting career ==
Blue's first notable acting role came in the 2007 film Lions for Lambs, co-starring with Robert Redford, Tom Cruise, and Meryl Streep. She has had guest roles in numerous TV shows, such as Veep, Bones, The Big Bang Theory, HawthoRNe, NCIS: Los Angeles, and Two and a Half Men. In 2010, she had a recurring role as Angela on the Fox sitcom Sons of Tucson; the show lasted one season. In 2012, Sarayu was cast as Dr. Sydney Napur, a series regular on David E. Kelley's medical drama Monday Mornings (TNT). In 2018, the actress became the lead in NBC TV series, I Feel Bad. It was cancelled after season 1. In the same year, Blue was paired opposite John Cena in the Universal Pictures comedy Blockers.

== Personal life ==
Blue was born in Madison, Wisconsin, to a Telugu family from India. Her parents are Velcheru Narayana Rao and Nidadavolu Malathi, both of whom are writers, in Telugu and English. She married Jonathan Blue, the Director of Creative Development at ReKon Productions. Blue attended West High School in Madison. She earned her Master of Fine Arts degree in acting in 2005 from the American Conservatory Theater in San Francisco.

== Filmography ==
=== Film ===
Year	Title	Role	Notes
2002	Leela	Mira	
2007	Lions for Lambs	Senator Irving's Receptionist	
2008	My Best Friend's Girl	Delia	TV movie
2010	Nathan vs. Nurture	Padma	TV movie
2011	Outnumbered	Lisa Ruth	TV movie
2011	Good News, Oklahoma	Sissy	Short
2012	...Or Die	Riz's Wife	Short
2013	Dealin' with Idiots	Opposing Team Parent	
2018	Khol (open)	Vidya	Short
2018	Blockers	Marcie Mannes	
2020	To All the Boys: P.S. I Still Love You	Trina Rothschild	
2020	Happiest Season	Carolyn McCoy	
2021	To All the Boys: Always and Forever	Trina Rothschild	
2022	Hollywood Stargirl	Alex	
2023	A Million Miles Away	Kalpana Chawla	
2024	Inside Out 2	Margie	Voice

=== Television ===
Year	Title	Role	Notes
2005	Bones	TV Reporter	Episode: "The Man on Death Row"
2006	Related	Nurse #1	Episode: "Here's a Balloon for You"
2007	Dirt	Assistant Pharmacist	Episode: "Pilot"
2007	Side Order of Life	Claire Philips	Episode: "What Price Truth?"
2007	The Big Bang Theory	Lalita Gupta	Episode: "The Grasshopper Experiment"
2008	Unhitched	Doreep	Episode: "Yorkshire Terrier Sucked Into the Internet"
2008	Untitled Liz Meriwether Project	Rupa	Episode: "Pilot"
2009	Life	Deepa	Episode: "Hit Me Baby"
2009	Hawthorne	Lindsay Bernard	Episode: "Healing Time"
2010	Sons of Tucson	Angela	Recurring cast
2010	Outsourced	Vimi	Recurring cast
2011	Harry's Law	Tiffany	Episode: "Pilot"
2011	In Plain Sight	Sudha Kumar	Episode: "Kumar vs Kumar"
2011	Franklin and Bash	Abha Jaya	Episode: "Big Fish"
2011	Un-Natural Selection	Kate	TV series
2011–14	NCIS: Los Angeles	Dr. Susan DePaul	3 episodes
2012	Fairly Legal	Allison	Episode: "Start Me Up"
2013	Monday Mornings	Dr. Sydney Napur	Main cast
2013	The Bridge	Doctor	Episode: "Take the Ride, Pay the Toll"
2014	Agents of S.H.I.E.L.D.	Dr. Jazuat	Episode: "T.A.H.I.T.I."
2014	Grey's Anatomy	Pam	Episode: "You've Got to Hide Your Love Away"
2015	Two and a Half Men	Emily	Episode: "Don't Give a Monkey a Gun"
2015	Chasing Life	Dr. Lin	Episode: "The Ghost in You"
2016	The Real O'Neals	Marcia Worthman	Recurring cast: season 1
2016	Veep	Dr. Mirpuri	Episode: "Mother"
2016	Rizzoli & Isles	Iris Najafi	Episode: "There Be Ghosts"
2016–17	No Tomorrow	Kareema	Main cast
2018	Wisdom of the Crowd	Defense Attorney Quinn	Episode: "The Tipping Point"
2018	Station 19	Audrey	Episode: "Hot Box"
2018	I Feel Bad	Emet	Main cast
2019–20	The Unicorn	Anna	Recurring cast: season 1
2020	Medical Police	Sloane McIntyre	Recurring cast
2020	Mira, Royal Detective	Various Characters (voice)	2 episodes
2020	The Rocketeer	Various Characters (voice)	3 episodes
2021	Dug Days	Bird (voice)	Episode: "Science"
2021	The Shrink Next Door	Miriam	Recurring cast
2022	Never Have I Ever	Rhyah	Recurring cast: season 3
2023	History of the World, Part II	Publisher	Episode 1
2023	XO, Kitty	Trina	2 episodes
2023-2024	Velma	Diya Dinkley (voice)	Recurring cast; Credited as Sarayu Blue
2024	Expats	Hilary Starr	Main cast
2025	Good American Family	Valika	Recurring role
