= My Phantoms =

2021 British novel by Gwendoline Riley

- Author: Gwendoline Riley
- Language: English
- Publication date: 2021

My Phantoms is a 2021 British novel by Gwendoline Riley, first published in the UK by Granta. The novel is Riley's sixth.

== Summary ==
Bridget Grant is a vegan and a scholar who lives in London with her boyfriend, John. From the age of 14 she is estranged from her father. The novel describes her court-mandated custody visits with him as a teenager and his bullying, attention-seeking behaviour. Bridget stops visiting him as soon as she is legally allowed. When he dies, his twin sister refuses to attend his funeral and advises Bridget not to attend either.

Bridget also has a difficult relationship with her mother, Helen, known as 'Hen'. Although she does choose to keep communicating with Hen and seeing her, their interactions are restricted to birthdays and Christmas. Bridget keeps the details of her life hidden, refusing to allow Hen to come to her home or meet John.

Once a year, Bridget and Hen meet up for an uncomfortable dinner. There are also letters and phone calls from Hen, in which she talks about her life and her social activities. She repeatedly boasts about her social successes, although the novel shows a series of missteps and failures. Bridget is persuaded to spend a few days with Hen, who is recovering from surgery. During this visit, they manage to achieve some positive communication and Hen agrees to make some changes. However, this all comes to nothing and Hen continues as before.

When Hen falls seriously ill and is admitted to hospital, Bridget travels to be with her. Their relationship remains difficult until the very end.

== Reception ==
In a review published by The New York Times, Lidija Haas compared Riley to Anton Chekov and Mary Gaitskill. CBC praised the novel as "a bold, heart-stopping portrayal of a failed familial bond". The Guardian also praised the work as a "devastating, quietly brutal novel".

Polish translation, Moje zmory by Maciej Stroiński, was released by Czarne in 2025.
