= 10:04 =

2014 novel by Ben Lerner

- First edition (US)
- Author: Ben Lerner
- Language: English
- Genre: Autofiction, metafiction
- Publisher: Farrar, Straus and Giroux (US); Granta (UK); McClelland & Stewart (Canada)
- Publication date: 2014
- Publication place: United States
- Media type: Print (hardcover and paperback); e-book
- Pages: 256
- ISBN: 978-1847088918

10:04 is the second novel by the American writer Ben Lerner.

== Description ==
The novel belongs to the genres of autofiction and metafiction. The first-person narrator is a 33-year-old writer who lives in New York City. A successful novelist, he has recently been diagnosed with a heart condition that could prove fatal. The book deals with love, art, city life, illness, having children, and writing.

== Reception ==
The critical reception of 10:04 has been largely positive. In 2024, the New York Times Book Review ranked the book #62 on their list of the 100 Best Books of the 21st Century (So Far).

== Awards ==
The novel was shortlisted for the 2014 Folio Prize.
