= Kalipatnam Ramarao =

Indian poet and writer (1924–2021)

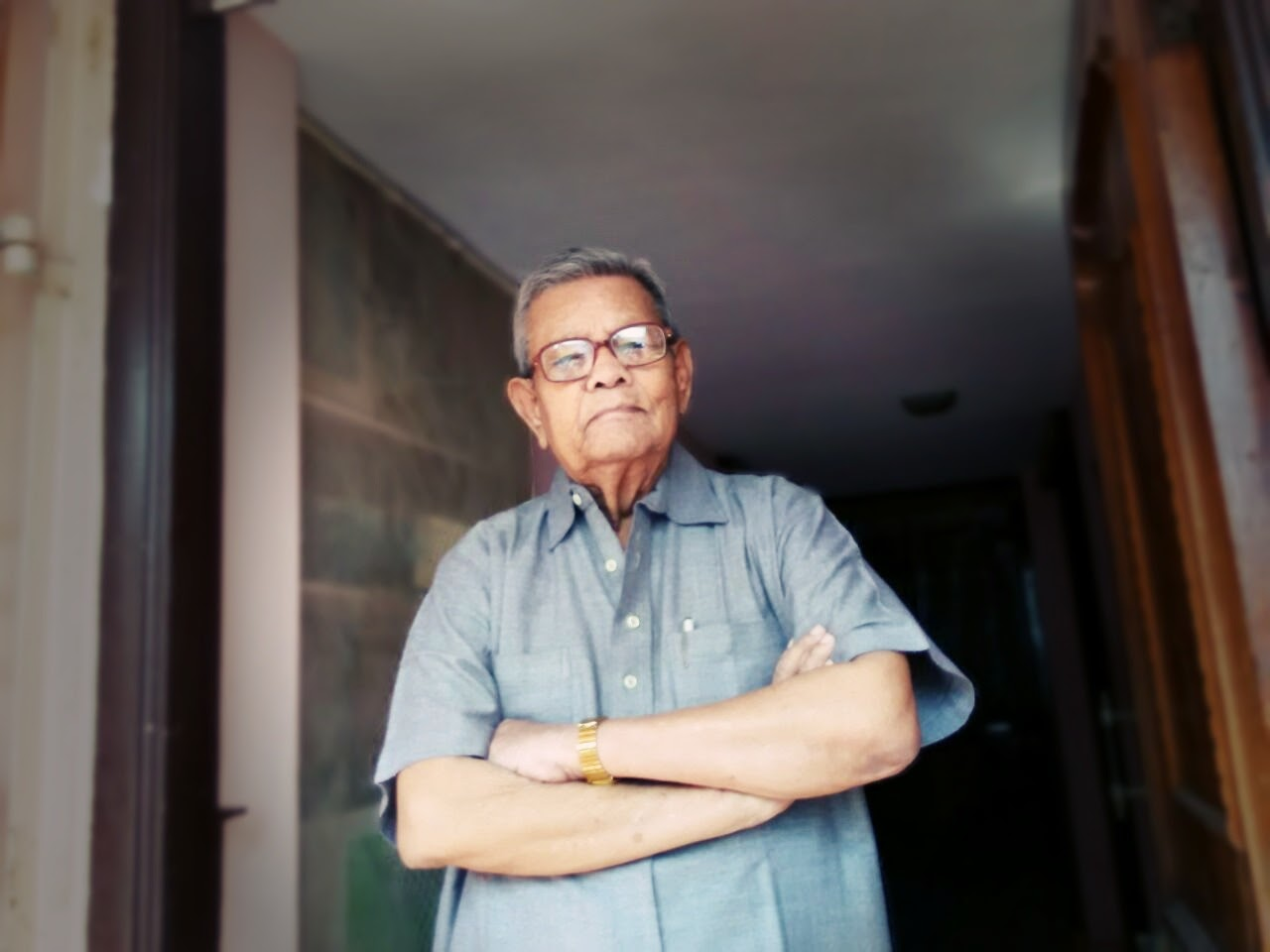
- Born: 9 November 1924; Murapaka, Srikakulam, India
- Died: 4 June 2021 (aged 96)
- Other name: Kara Master
- Occupations: Writer, poet and teacher
- Known for: Yajnam To Tommidi

Kalipatnam Ramarao (9 November 1924 – 4 June 2021) was an Indian poet, writer and teacher who wrote in Telugu. Also known as Kara Master, he received the 1995 Sahitya Akademi Award in Telugu for his short-story collection Yajnam To Tommidi.

== Career ==
Ramarao was born in 1924 in Murapaka, Srikakulam, India. He taught at St. Anthony's High School in Visakhapatnam until his retirement in 1979. Writer Yandamuri Veerendranath has said that Ramarao inspired his writing career and that he regarded him as a guru. Ramarao's stories generally concern people from the middle and lower classes and the social, economic and political pressures on everyday life.

His first story, "Chitragupta", was a brief piece written on the back of a postcard. Dissatisfied with his work, he stopped writing in 1955. He returned eight years later with "Teerpu" (1963). During the late 1960s he wrote stories including "Yagnam", "mahadaaseervacanamu", "veerudu-mahaveerudu", "Adivaram", "Himsa", "No room", "Sneham", "Arthi", "Bhayam", "Santhi", "Chavu", "Jevvana dhara" and "Kutra". After "Kutra", he took another break from writing. He later said that early in his career he wrote frequently but often withheld stories from publication because he was dissatisfied with them. In later years he generally wrote one or two stories annually. His work has been translated into English, Russian and other languages.

Ramarao served on the executive committee of the Viplava Rachayitala Sangham. He received the 1995 Sahitya Akademi Award in Telugu. The Loknayak Foundation honoured him in Visakhapatnam on 18 January 2008.

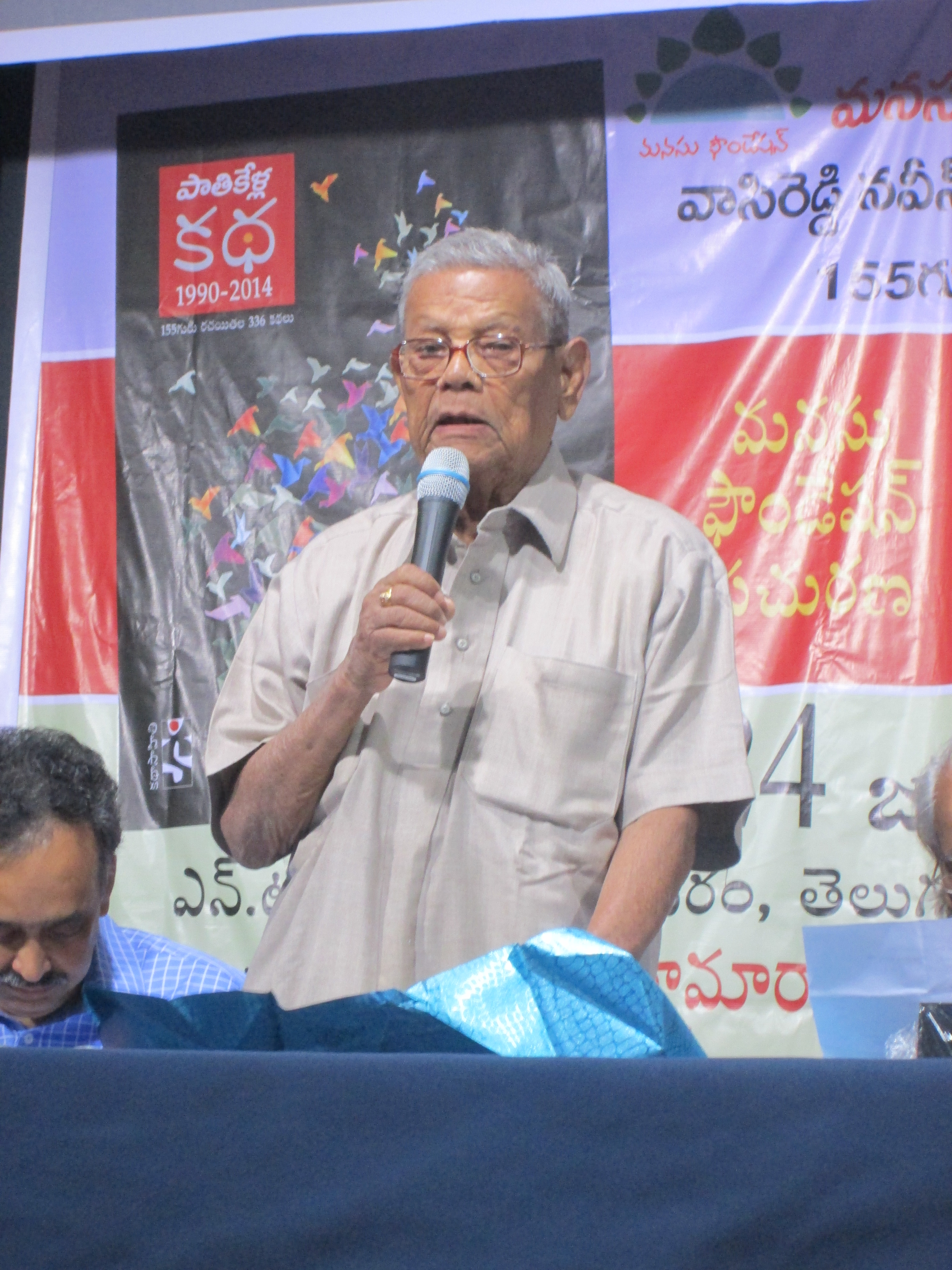
Ramarao speaking at a Telugu short-story book launch

== Later activities ==
During his later career, Ramarao edited and published short-story anthologies by other writers. In 1993 he attended the ninth TANA Conference–World Telugu Convention in New York as a guest. His 90th birthday was marked by events across Andhra Pradesh in 2014, when he suggested that he might resume writing.

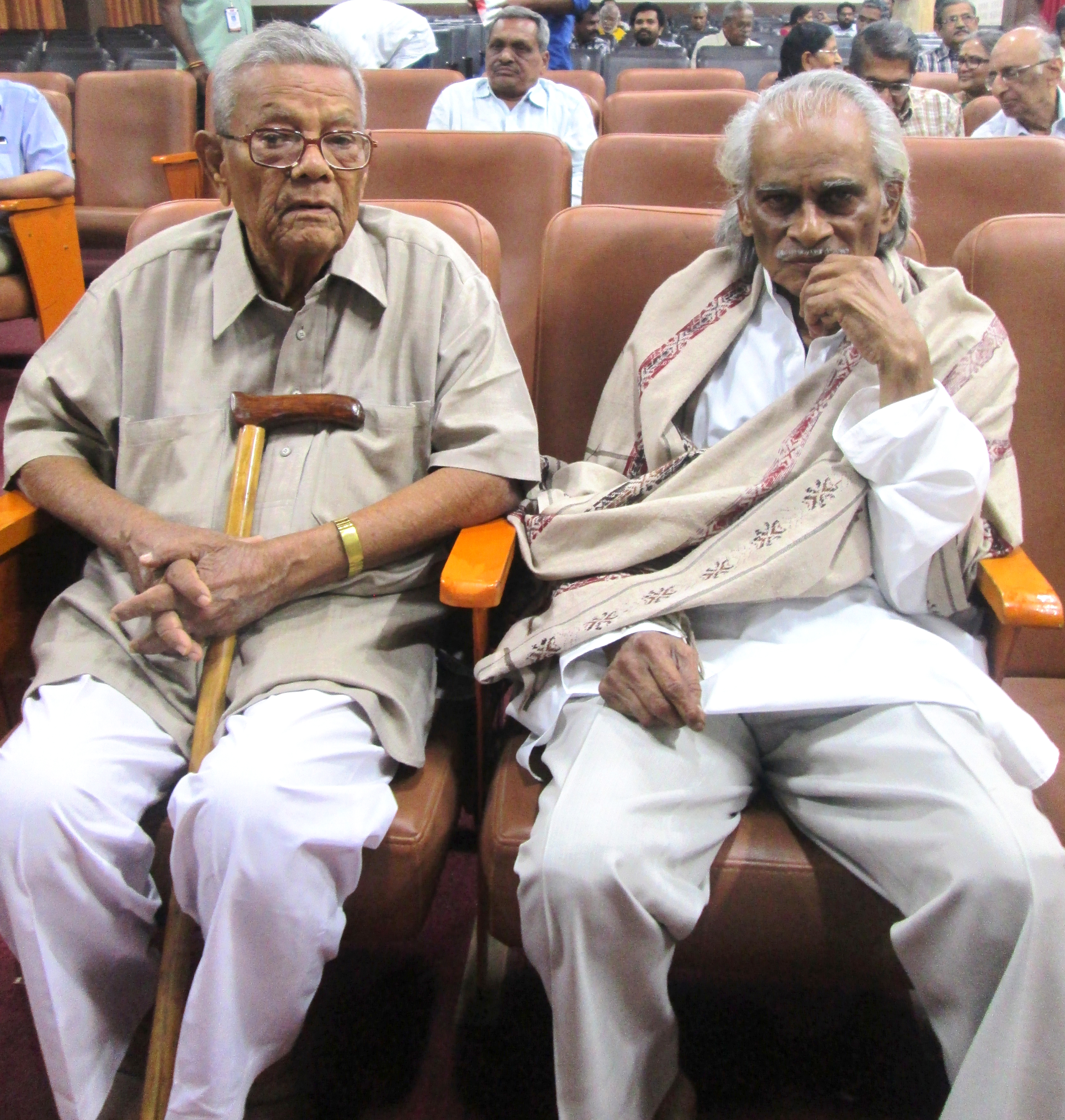
Ramarao with writer K Siva Reddy

== Katha Nilayam ==
On 22 February 1997 Ramarao founded Katha Nilayam, a research centre and library intended to preserve Telugu literature for future readers. The centre is located in Visakha 'A' Colony in Srikakulam. It holds more than 5,000 weekly, monthly and special-edition periodicals, along with other Telugu magazines.

== Lok Sabha recognition ==
A message from the Speaker of the Lok Sabha honouring Ramarao said that his writing drew on his early experiences and highlighted "Yagnam" (1964) for its depiction of village feudalism and social class. The message also noted that his work had been translated into Russian, English and several Indian languages.

== Written works ==
- Yajnam To Tommidi (short stories)
- Yagnam (novel)
- Abhimanalu
- Ragamayi
- Jeevadhara
- mahadaaseervacanamu
- veerudu-mahaveerudu
- Adivaram
- Himsa
- No room
- Sneham

== Awards ==
- Nandi Award for Second Best Story Writer – Yagnam
