= Bangaru Sankellu =

1968 Indian film

- Directed by: G. Ramaneedu
- Starring: Haranath, Jamuna, Gummadi, Raja Babu, Rama Prabha, Radhika, Jyothika, T. G. Kamala Devi, Tilakam
- Release date: November 1, 1968
- Country: India
- Language: Telugu

Bangaru Sankellu is a 1968 Telugu movie starring Haranath, Jamuna, Gummadi, Raja Babu, Rama Prabha, Radhika, Jyothika, T. G. Kamala Devi, Tilakam. Directed by G. Ramaneedu released on 1 November 1968. It has a couple of popular songs like "Evariki Puttina Paapa" and "Andam Urikindi".
