= 2018 Man Booker Prize =

Literary award

The 2018 Booker Prize for Fiction was awarded at a ceremony on 16 October 2018. The Man Booker dozen of 13 books was announced on 24 July, and was narrowed down to a shortlist of six on 20 September. The longlist included Sabrina by Nick Drnaso, the first in Booker Prize history to nominate a graphic novel.

Anna Burns was awarded the 2018 Booker Prize for her third novel, Milkman, receiving £50,000; she became the first Northern Irish author to win the prize.

== Judging panel ==
- Kwame Anthony Appiah
- Val McDermid
- Leo Robson
- Jacqueline Rose
- Leanne Shapton

== Nominees ==
indicates the winner

=== Shortlist ===
Author	Title	Genre(s)	Country	Publisher
Anna Burns	Milkman	Novel	UK	Faber & Faber
Esi Edugyan	Washington Black	Novel	Canada	Serpent's Tail
Daisy Johnson	Everything Under	Novel	UK	Jonathan Cape
Rachel Kushner	The Mars Room	Novel	USA	Jonathan Cape
Richard Powers	The Overstory	Novel	USA	William Heinemann
Robin Robertson	The Long Take	Verse Novel	UK	Picador

=== Longlist ===
Author	Title	Genre(s)	Country	Publisher
Belinda Bauer	Snap	Crime	UK	Bantam Press
Anna Burns	Milkman	Novel	UK	Faber & Faber
Nick Drnaso	Sabrina	Graphic Novel	USA	Granta
Esi Edugyan	Washington Black	Novel	Canada	Serpent's Tail
Guy Gunaratne	In Our Mad and Furious City	Novel	UK	Tinder Press
Daisy Johnson	Everything Under	Novel	UK	Jonathan Cape
Rachel Kushner	The Mars Room	Novel	USA	Jonathan Cape
Sophie Mackintosh	The Water Cure	Novel	UK	Hamish Hamilton
Michael Ondaatje	Warlight	Novel	Canada	Jonathan Cape
Richard Powers	The Overstory	Novel	USA	William Heinemann
Robin Robertson	The Long Take	Verse Novel	UK	Picador
Sally Rooney	Normal People	Novel	Ireland	Faber & Faber
Donal Ryan	From a Low and Quiet Sea	Novel	Ireland	Doubleday Ireland

== See also ==
- List of winners and shortlisted authors of the Booker Prize for Fiction
