= Lyra McKee =

Northern Ireland journalist (1990–2019)

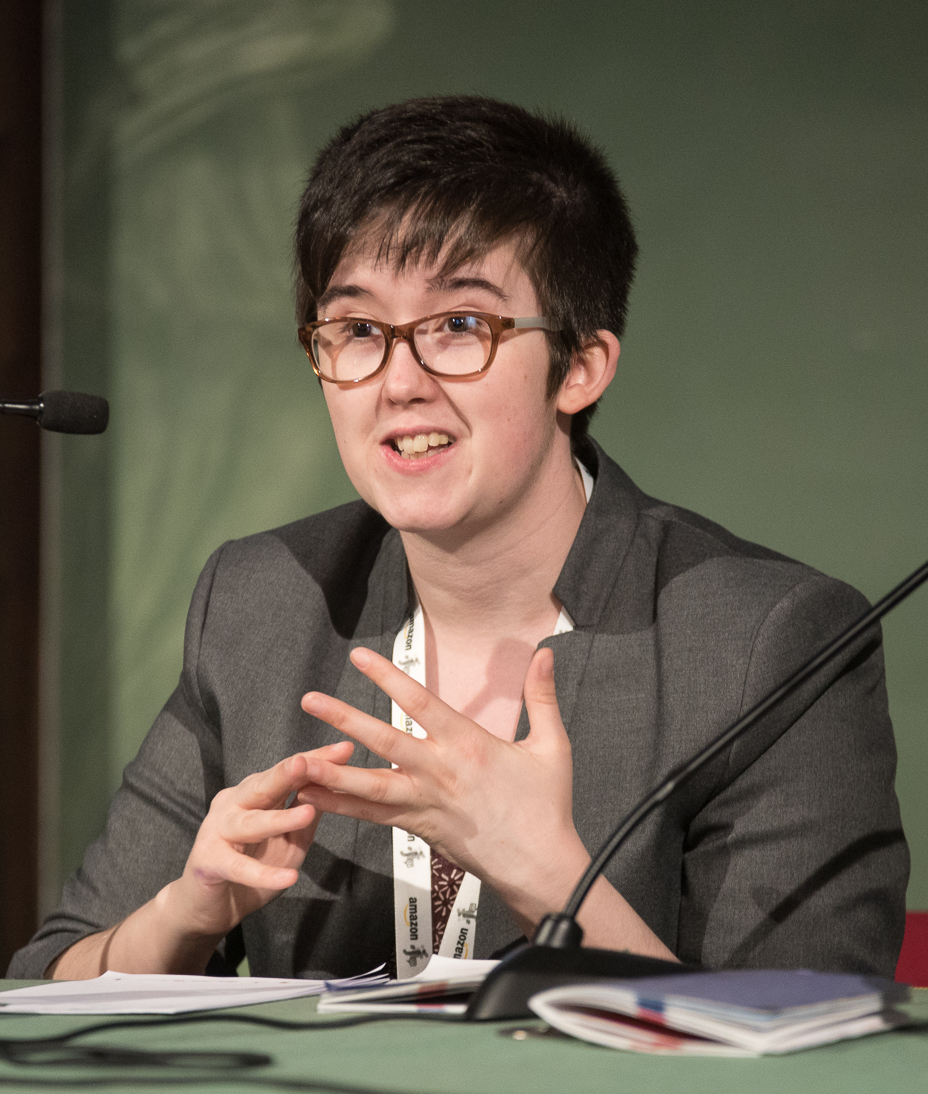
- McKee in 2017
- Born: Lyra Catherine McKee; 31 March 1990; Belfast, Northern Ireland
- Died: 18 April 2019 (aged 29); Derry, Northern Ireland
- Cause of death: Gunshot wound
- Education: Birmingham City University (M.A.)
- Occupation: Journalist
- Works: Angels with Blue Faces (2019)
- Awards: Forbes 30 Under 30 (2016)

Lyra Catherine McKee (/ˈlɪərə məˈkiː/; 31 March 1990 – 18 April 2019) was a journalist from Northern Ireland who wrote for several publications about the consequences of the Troubles. She also served as an editor for Mediagazer, a news aggregator website. On 18 April 2019, McKee was fatally shot while observing rioting in the Creggan area of Derry. (Note: There is a longstanding Derry/Londonderry name dispute. This article follows the approach that Derry refers to the city and County Londonderry refers to the county (outside of organisations' names, which may follow their own approaches).)

== Early life and education ==
Lyra Catherine McKee was born on 31 March 1990 in Belfast, Northern Ireland. Her interest in journalism began at the age of 14 when she wrote for the school newspaper at St Gemma's High School. The following year she joined Headliners, a charity that supports young people by helping them develop journalism skills, and through this was awarded the Young Journalist Award by Sky News in 2006. She studied online journalism at Birmingham City University under Paul Bradshaw, pursuing a Master of Arts degree but did not graduate. She was posthumously awarded an MA in online journalism in January 2020, with her sister, Nichola, accepting the degree on her behalf.

== Career ==
In 2011, McKee joined the staff of the news aggregator Mediagazer, a sister site of the technology news aggregator Techmeme. In 2014, she came to wider public attention with the publication of her blog post titled "Letter to my 14-year-old self", in which she described the challenges of growing up gay in Belfast; it was later made into a short film. Her journalism appeared in both domestic and international media, including articles for Mosaic (republished by The Atlantic), The Belfast Telegraph, Private Eye and BuzzFeed News. In 2016, Forbes named her among its "30 under 30 in media" for her work as an investigative reporter.

Publication of her first book, Angels with Blue Faces, was imminent at the time of her death. The non-fiction work examines the Provisional IRA killing of Belfast MP Robert Bradford. McKee sought crowdfunding to finance its publication, and it was scheduled to be released by Excalibur Press. She subsequently signed a two-book deal with Faber and Faber. At the time of her death, her second book, The Lost Boys, was scheduled for publication in 2020, but remained unfinished. It concerns the disappearances of Thomas Spence and John Rodgers from Belfast's Falls Road in November 1974. Faber and Faber compared the work to Anna Funder's Stasiland and Andy O'Hagan's The Missing. A collection of her writing Lost, Found, Remembered was posthumously published in 2021.

McKee wrote on the consequences of The Troubles, including "Suicide of the Ceasefire Babies", an article on teenage suicides linked to the conflict. At the time of her death, she was researching unsolved killings from the late 20th century in Northern Ireland. In March 2019, Irish Times writer Martin Doyle featured her in his article "Best of Irish: 10 rising stars of Irish writing".

She gave a TEDx talk, "How uncomfortable conversations can save lives", at TEDxStormont Women in 2017, addressing the 2016 Orlando nightclub shooting. In 2018, she became a trustee of Headliners, the charity that had helped her begin her journalism career as a teenager.

McKee was the partner of Sara Canning, a nurse at Altnagelvin Area Hospital, and had moved to Derry to be with her. After her death, it was revealed that she had been planning to propose marriage to Canning and had purchased an engagement ring.

== Works ==
- Angels with Blue Faces. Belfast, Northern Ireland: Excalibur Press Ltd. September 2019. ISBN 978-1-910728-43-7.
- Lost, Found, Remembered. Faber & Faber. 31 March 2020. ISBN 978-0-571-35146-6.

== Killing ==
On 18 April 2019, McKee was shot while observing rioting in the Creggan area of Derry, Northern Ireland. Violence broke out after police raids on dissidents aimed at seizing munitions ahead of the Easter Rising commemorative parades due to take place in the area that weekend. The disturbances were centred on Fanad Drive, where youths threw petrol bombs and burnt two vehicles. Police said that a gunman then fired up to 12 shots towards officers. McKee, who was standing near an armoured police Land Rover on Fanad Drive, was wounded in the head. Mobile phone and police CCTV footage shows a masked gunman, believed to be a member of the New IRA, opening fire with a handgun. She was taken by police in an armoured Land Rover to Altnagelvin Area Hospital, where she later died. Police blamed dissident republicans for her death. The last journalist killed in the UK had been Martin O'Hagan in 2001.

=== Funeral and vigils ===
McKee's funeral took place at the Anglican St Anne's Cathedral, Belfast, on 24 April. It was attended by British Prime Minister Theresa May, Irish President Michael D. Higgins, Taoiseach Leo Varadkar, DUP leader Arlene Foster, Sinn Féin leader Mary Lou McDonald, Sinn Féin Vice President Michelle O'Neill and Labour Party leader Jeremy Corbyn. Members of the National Union of Journalists formed a guard of honour, and her coffin was met with applause from the waiting public as it arrived at the cathedral.

A vigil at the site of her killing held on 19 April was attended by Colum Eastwood, Arlene Foster, Naomi Long and Mary Lou McDonald. A second vigil was held at Belfast City Hall, attended by author Anna Burns and John O'Doherty of the Rainbow Project, an LGBT rights charity in Northern Ireland.

=== Reactions ===
British Prime Minister Theresa May described the killing as "shocking and senseless", saying McKee "died doing her job with great courage". Taoiseach Leo Varadkar said "our solidarity also goes out to the people of Derry and to the entire journalism community. We cannot allow those who want to propagate violence, fear and hate to drag us back to the past." Irish President Michael D. Higgins, said "the loss of a journalist at any time in any part of the world is an attack on truth itself."

U.S. House Speaker Nancy Pelosi, who had visited Derry only hours earlier, also condemned the killing. Religious leaders from several denominations issued statements, including Ken Good, Church of Ireland Bishop of Derry and Raphoe; Diarmuid Martin, Catholic Archbishop of Dublin; Donal McKeown, Catholic Bishop of Derry; and Charles McMullen, Moderator of the Presbyterian Church in Ireland. Other public figures to express condolences included Karen Bradley, Secretary of State for Northern Ireland, and former US President Bill Clinton. Séamus Dooley, assistant general secretary of the National Union of Journalists in Northern Ireland, described her as "a journalist of courage, style and integrity".

The leaders of Northern Ireland's main political parties, the DUP, Sinn Féin, UUP, SDLP, Alliance Party and Green Party, released a joint statement condemning the killing and describing it as "an attack on all the people of this community, an attack on the peace and democratic processes". They said it was a "pointless and futile act to destroy the progress made over the last 20 years, which has the overwhelming support of people everywhere", and reiterated their support for the Police Service of Northern Ireland, who were the intended targets of the gun attack.

=== Investigations and prosecutions ===
The investigative website Bellingcat published an "Open Source Survey" of the shooting. On the same day, police arrested two men, aged 18 and 19, on suspicion of involvement in McKee's killing. They were released without charge the following day. On 23 April, The Irish News reported that the New IRA had admitted responsibility, stated that McKee was not the intended target, and offered apologies to her family and partner. Police arrested a 57-year-old woman the same day; she was later released unconditionally.

On 25 April, the charity Crimestoppers offered a reward of up to £10,000 for information leading to the conviction of those responsible. On 1 May, the PSNI confirmed it would offer anonymity to any witnesses who came forward.

Leona O’Neill, a Derry journalist who witnessed and wrote about the killing, later received online threats alleging that she was responsible or had fabricated her account.

On 11 February 2020, four men, aged 20, 27, 29 and 52 were arrested under the Terrorism Act in Derry. A 52-year-old man was charged with McKee's murder the following day. In early June 2020, police recovered the weapon, a Hämmerli X-Esse .22 LR pistol, from the Ballymagroarty area of Derry. Niall Sheerin, a 28-year-old man from Derry, was subsequently charged with possessing a firearm in suspicious circumstances and possessing a firearm with intent to endanger life; he denied the charges. In a 2021 statement to the Belfast High Court, the prosecution said the gun had been used in four paramilitary attacks between September 2018 and March 2019. In September 2022, Sheerin was sentenced to seven years in prison for possessing the gun, but not for any involvement in McKee's death.

On 10 March 2023, two men appeared in court by video before Mr Justice O'Hara, charged with McKee's murder, possessing a handgun and ammunition with intent, and offences connected to the riot, all of which they denied. The trial began on 30 May 2024, with three men charged with McKee's murder. On 3 July 2026, they were found not guilty. No-one has yet been charged with firing the shot which killed McKee.

== Legacy ==
=== Memorial ===
A stained-glass window honouring the city's LGBTQ+ community, featuring McKee, was unveiled at Belfast City Hall in May 2025.

=== Television ===
McKee, and her friends' efforts to secure a conviction after her death, are the subject of The Real Derry Girls, a documentary by Peter Taylor for the BBC.

In November 2022, the film Lyra, directed by Alison Millar, a mentor and friend to McKee, was screened in UK and Irish cinemas, and broadcast on Channel 4 in April 2023. It received the Tim Hetherington award at the Sheffield Documentary Festival and the audience award at the Cork Film Festival.

In August 2026, The Murder Detective, a midweek three-part true crime Channel 4 TV documentary, by James W Newton, follows the Welsh-born man in charge of the Lyra McKee case, and head of major investigations for Police Service of Northern Ireland, Jason Murphy's seven-year investigation of the CCTV footage of the murder scene, and footage for a documentary for MTV about Saoradh, featuring Reggie Yates.

=== Songs ===
The band The Young'uns paid tribute to McKee in a song on their 2023 album Tiny Notes.

Irish singer Christy Moore included a song titled "Lyra McKee" on his 2024 album A Terrible Beauty; it was written by Dublin-born songwriter James Cramer.

== See also ==
- List of journalists killed in Europe
