= Headliner =

Headliner(s) may refer to:

== Arts and entertainment ==
- Headliner (DJ) (born 1967), musician
- Headliner (performances), a main act, following an opening act, or the leading attraction in any piece of entertainment
- Headliner (TV programme), a Hong Kong political satire programme, produced by Radio Television Hong Kong
- Headliners, a BBC Radio 5 Live series of interviews hosted by Nihal Arthanayake
- Headliners (TV series), a 2024 Australian documentary series featuring musicians with disabilities who are given the opportunity to form bands and perform at a major festival

== Other uses ==
- Headliner (material), the overhead layer of material closest to the passenger of a vehicle
- Headliners (charity), a British youth charity

== See also ==
- Paramount Headliner, a series of 1930s musical shorts or "one-reelers" by Paramount Pictures, featuring performers who were headliners
