= The Mars Room =

2018 novel by Rachel Kushner

- First edition hardcover
- Author: Rachel Kushner
- Language: English
- Genre: Novel
- Publisher: Scribner
- Publication date: May 1, 2018
- Publication place: United States
- Media type: Print (hardback)
- Pages: 352 pp (first edition, hardback)
- ISBN: 1-476-75655-4 (first edition, hardback)
- OCLC: 1006798259
- Dewey Decimal: 813.6
- LC Class: PS3611.U7386M37 2018
- Preceded by: The Strange Case of Rachel K
- Followed by: Creation Lake

The Mars Room is a 2018 novel by American author Rachel Kushner. The book was released on May 1, 2018 through Scribner. It was shortlisted for the 2018 Man Booker Prize. On November 5, 2018, it received the 2018 Prix Médicis Étranger. The title also received a Gold Medal for Fiction from the California Book Awards.

== Plot ==
It's 2003 and Romy Hall is at the start of two consecutive life sentences at Stanville Women's Correctional Facility, deep in California's Central Valley. Outside is the world from which she has been severed: the San Francisco of her youth and her young son, Jackson. Inside is a new reality: thousands of women hustling for the bare essentials needed to survive; the bluffing, pageantry, and casual acts of violence by guards and prisoners alike; and the deadpan absurdities of institutional living. The novel also tells the story of Gordon Hauser, an academic teaching inmates at the prison.

== Reception ==
In The Irish Times, critic Rob Doyle called The Mars Room "one of the greatest novels I have read in years." Doyle added, "Her prior novel, The Flamethrowers, was expansive and thrilling, but this is richer and deeper, more ambitious in its moral vision." In The Guardian, critic Lisa Allardice called the novel "unflinching and immersive," writing, "Kushner’s prose fizzes as dangerously as the electric fence around Stanville, her observations spiky as barbed wire, her humour desert-sky dark." The Los Angeles Times called the novel "devastating". Similarly, Kirkus Reviews described the novel as "an unforgiving look at a brutal system." Writing for NPR, Michael Schaub noted that Kushner "writes with an intelligence and a ferocity that sets her apart from most others in her cohort. She's a remarkably original and compassionate author, and The Mars Room is a heartbreaking, true and nearly flawless novel." Ron Charles of The Washington Post felt the novel accurately depicted the experience of poverty and prison in America, however he felt, "there’s something so calculated about 'The Mars Room' that even the most progressive readers are bound to feel like they’re being marched down a narrow hallway. I never felt those heavy paws in Kushner’s previous, far more dynamic novels."

== Honors and awards ==
The Mars Room was shortlisted for the 2018 Man Booker Prize and the National Book Critics Circle Award for Fiction. On November 5, 2018, The Mars Room received France's Prix Médicis Étranger.
