= The Strange Case of Rachel K =

Short story collection by Rachel Kushner

- First edition hardcover
- Author: Rachel Kushner
- Language: English
- Genre: Short stories
- Publisher: New Directions
- Publication date: March 24, 2015
- Publication place: United States
- Media type: Print (hardback)
- Pages: 96 pp (first edition, hardback)
- ISBN: 978-0811224215 (first edition, hardback)
- Preceded by: The Flamethrowers
- Followed by: The Mars Room

The Strange Case of Rachel K is a 2015 short story collection by American author Rachel Kushner.

The book was released on March 24, 2015 through New Directions Publishing and it consists of three short stories which appeared previously in various literary journals. The two first stories, "The Great Exception" and "Debouchement" are early versions of parts of Rachel Kushner's debut novel Telex from Cuba (2008)

== Title ==
In the short preface of the book, the author explains that The Strange Case of Rachel K is the name of a "Cuban film made in the early 1970's [El extraño caso de Rachel K (1973) directed by Oscar Valdés], during Cuba's great revolutionary renaissance" which recounts the story of a real person named Rachel K "a 1930's courtesan found murdered in a hotel room". Although Kushner has not seen the film, she uses this story as the basis of her own interpretation of the event.

== Reception ==
The collection received generally positive reviews upon its release. A review for the Chicago Tribune points out that "those already sold on Kushner will be eager to read the raw materials of her debut novel" and that it shows "a compelling case for [Kushner's] prose". Another review for the Toronto Star says the stories show "a sense of how excitingly intense and weird Kushner can get" and that they give "a seeming prescience [of her later novels] that will only give her fans reason to love her more".

== List of stories ==
- "The Great Exception"
- "Debouchement"
- "The Strange Case of Rachel K"
