= Clampitt =

Clampitt is a surname. Notable people with the surname include:

- Amy Clampitt (1920–1994), American poet and author
- Edward A. Clampitt (1868–1919), American pioneer oilman
- Jaime Clampitt (born 1976), Canadian boxer
- Jim Clampitt (1881–1934), English rugby player
- Leroy Clampitt (born 1992), New Zealand record producer
- Mike Clampitt (1955–2026), American politician
- Lisa Clampitt (1964), American matchmaker and author

== See also ==
- Clampett (disambiguation)
