= Million Dollar Matchmaker =

Television series

- Genre: Reality television
- Based on: Millionaire Matchmaker
- Presented by: Patti Stanger
- Starring: Season 2 co-stars Candace Smith, Maxwell Billieon
- Country of origin: United States
- Original language: English
- No. of seasons: 2
- No. of episodes: 20

Production
- Executive producers: Adam Freeman; Adam Reed; Spike Van Briesen; Rob Lee; Leslie Greif; Lauren Gellert; Sitarah Pendelton-Eaglin; David Stefanou; Patti Stanger
- Production locations: Los Angeles, CA
- Running time: 42 minutes
- Production company: Thinkfactory Media

Original release
- Network: We TV
- Release: July 8, 2016 – October 6, 2017

Related
- Millionaire Matchmaker

Million Dollar Matchmaker is an American reality television show, first broadcast on July 8, 2016 on We TV. The AMC Networks series franchise is fronted by Patti Stanger, who serves financially wealthy clients in their quest for love.

The series opener was officially slated for production during September 2015, shadowing the Bravo broadcast of the same premise The Millionaire Matchmaker popularly hosted by Patti Stanger. The ten-episode season proved to gather ratings worthy of a continuing installment.

On April 5, 2017 it was announced that AMC Networks had ordered a second season of Million Dollar Matchmaker, making its debut on We TV on August 4, 2017. In season two, Stanger returns with a set of fellow relationship experts joining her matchmaking team: Candace Smith and Maxwell Billieon. The Million Dollar Matchmaking trio join forces for one mission: to help client of celebrity status and financial wealth find love.

== Episodes ==
=== Season 1 (2016) ===
No.	Title	Original release date	U.S. viewers (millions)
1	The Ken Doll and the Cliff Diver	July 8, 2016	N/A
2	The Princess and the Man Boy	July 15, 2016	N/A
3	Farrah Abraham and the Obsessed Dad	July 22, 2016	N/A
4	Loosey Goosey and Mr. Forever 21	July 29, 2016	N/A
5	The Pop Star and American Psycho	August 5, 2016	N/A
6	The Dumped DJ and Shallow Hal	August 12, 2016	N/A
7	The Ice Queen and the Playboy Chef	August 19, 2016	N/A
8	The Crying Virgin and the Gullible Artist	August 26, 2016	N/A
9	Immature Bridesmaid and the Ex From the Block	September 2, 2016	N/A
10	The Doormat and the Lazy Lion	September 9, 2016	N/A

=== Season 2 (2017) ===
No.	Title	Original Air Date	US viewers
1	The Cliff Diver and The Egomaniac	August 4, 2017	N/A
2	Devina A.D.D. and the Relationship Virgin	August 11, 2017	N/A
3	Mr. Build-A-Girl and the Basketball Wife	August 18, 2017	N/A
4	The Ageist and the Snob	August 25, 2017	N/A
5	Little Lovebird and Mr. Know-It-All	September 1, 2017	N/A
6	The Rapping Politician and the 90s Rap Icon	September 8, 2017	N/A
7	Bad Boy Magnet and the Insta-Ham	September 15, 2017	N/A
8	Mr. Hit It and Quit It and the Baywatch Babe	September 22, 2017	N/A
9	Crazy Kelly & the Desperate Housewife	September 29, 2017	N/A
10	Mr. Self-Absorbed & The Trainwreck	October 6, 2017	N/A
