= Ardoyne =

Ardoyne Ard Eoin
- District
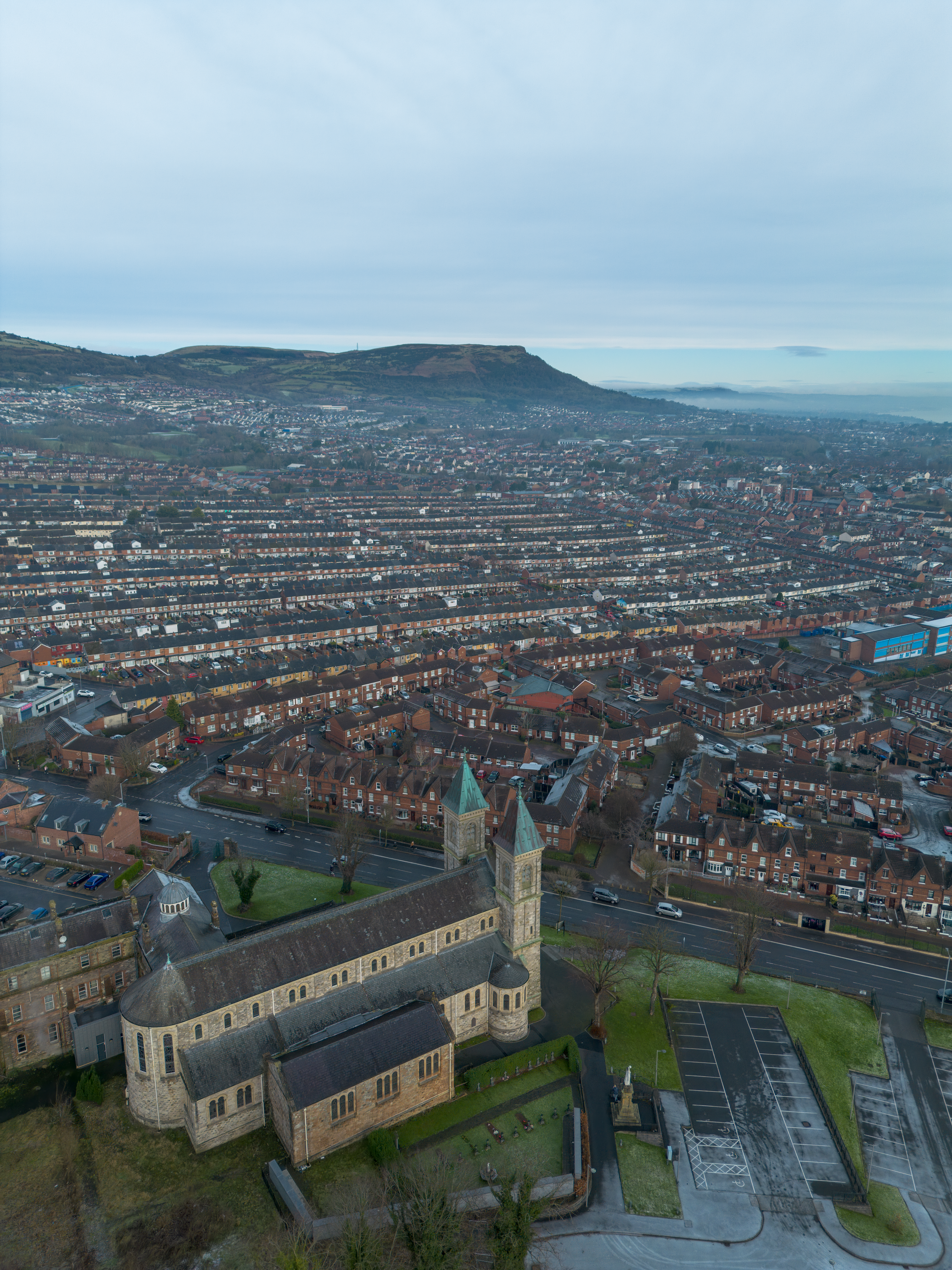
- Aerial view of Ardoyne from Holy Cross parish
- Interactive map of Ardoyne
- Coordinates: 54°36′52″N 05°57′25″W
- Sovereign State: United Kingdom
- Constituent Country: Northern Ireland
- County: County Antrim
- City: Belfast

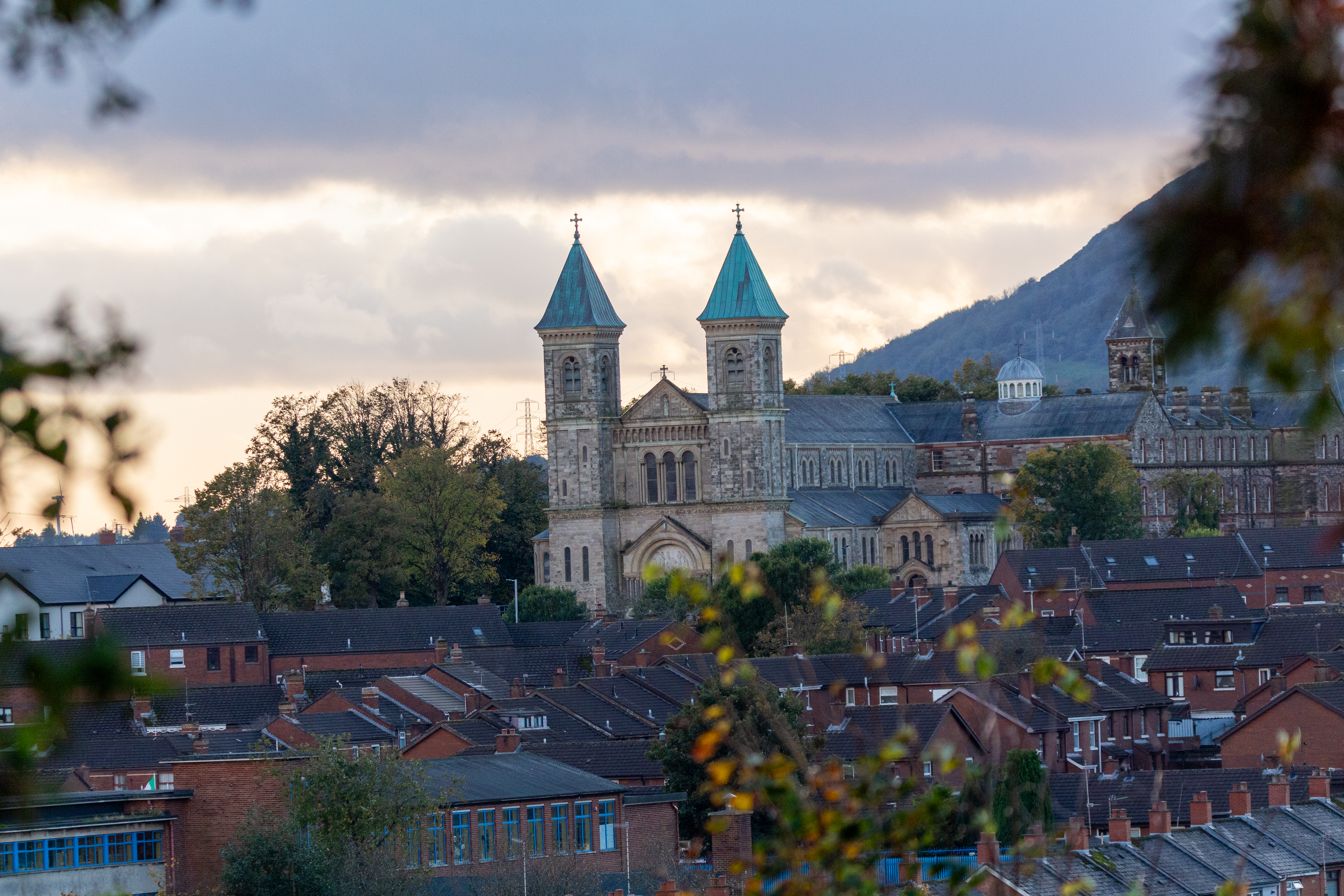
Ardoyne area as viewed from Marrowbone Park

Ardoyne (from Irish Ard Eoin 'Eoin's height') is a working class and mainly Catholic and Irish republican district in north Belfast, Northern Ireland. Ardoyne gained notoriety due to the large number of incidents during the Troubles.

== Foundation ==
The village of Ardoyne was founded in 1815 when businessman Michael Andrews moved his damask factory from Little York Street. In addition to the factory he built a large house for himself and thirty houses for employees to live in. More mills were built around the growing village and by 1850 there were three additional mills in the area, providing jobs and houses for a growing population. The house in which Andrews lived in is no longer there. It is now the site of the Crumlin Star Social Club, located in Balholm Drive at the top of Ardoyne.

== Crumlin Road ==
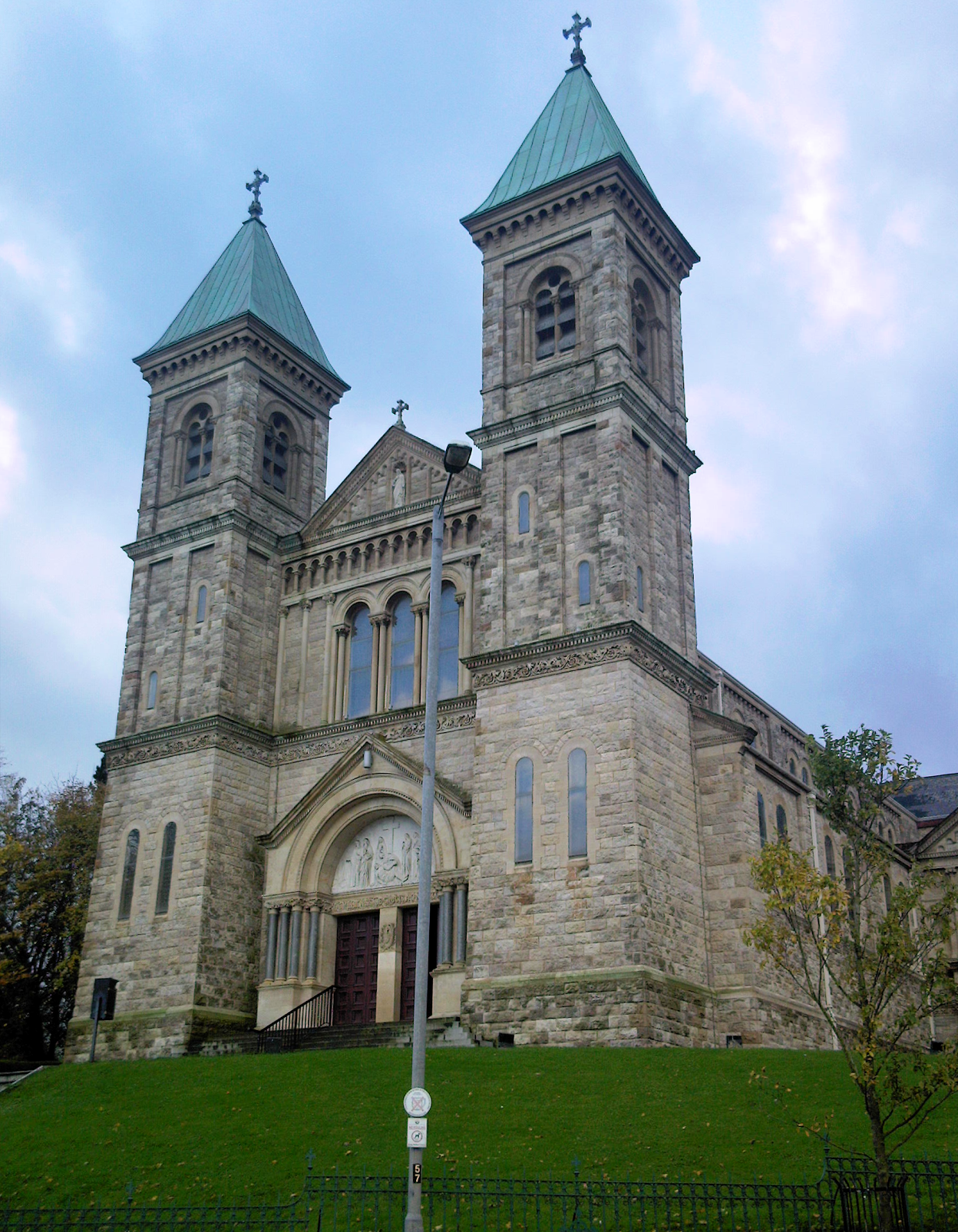
Holy Cross Church, Crumlin Road. The main Roman Catholic place of worship for Ardoyne

Ardoyne is bordered on the west by the Crumlin Road, an area which has for the most part a majority Protestant population and forms an interface area. For many years, on the Twelfth and during the rest of the marching season parades held by the Orange Order have led to conflict between the two communities. Controversy has been sparked by the differing attitudes of the two communities to the marches, with the Orange Order and their supporters arguing that they are following traditional parade routes, whilst their nationalist critics argue that the marches are triumphalist, provocative and not wanted in their area.

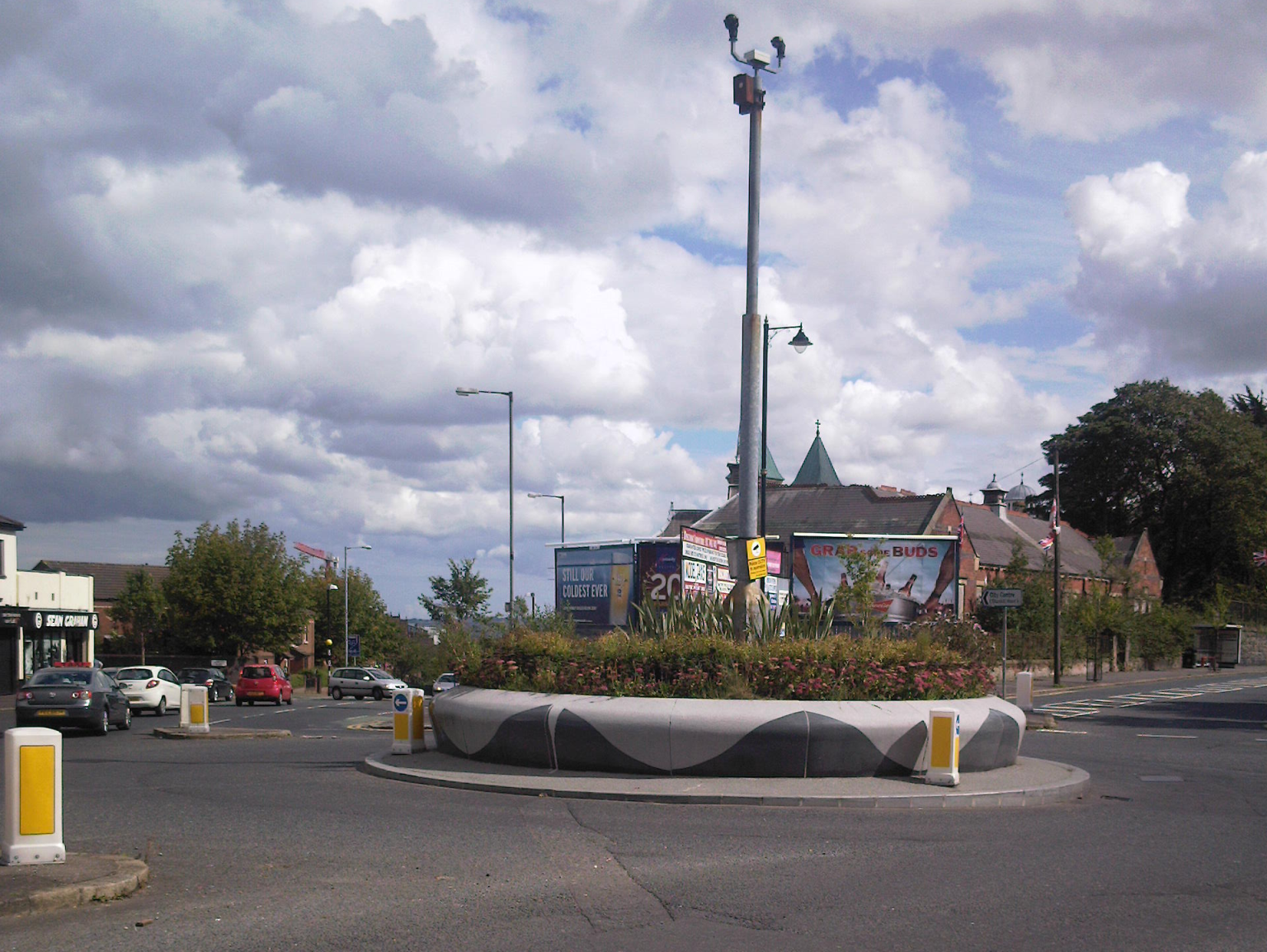
Crumlin Road roundabout, with the Ardoyne shops on the left of the picture

For the most part the Parades Commission has given permission for the Twelfth marches to go past the flashpoint Ardoyne shops, close to the Crumlin Road roundabout which also leads on to the Woodvale Road. One particular cause of conflict was that, in the past, marchers had carried flags associated with the Ulster Volunteer Force and the Ulster Defence Association (paramilitary Loyalist organisations), and played loyalist songs. In 2010, however, the Shankill Star flute band was banned from carrying a controversial banner depicting UVF member Brian Robinson.

Since there are only two exits from the estate, residents on the opposite side of the Crumlin Road (Mountainview) are barricaded into their street by the police and Army for several hours throughout the day: in the morning when the march goes by; and in the evening when it returns. Local residents believe this to be a breach of their human rights. The Police Ombudsman concurs with this assessment but is of the opinion that the barriers are necessary for security reasons.

Unionists have highlighted the part republican organisations have played in protests including prominent convicted IRA men such as Sean Kelly who was arrested after violent protests during a parade.

Despite the local community group, the Ardoyne Parades Dialogue Group, and representatives of the march, the North and West Belfast Parades Forum, reaching an accommodation which imposed conditions on the march, golf balls and stones were thrown by protesters being kept back by stewards. Riots that broke out following the 2010 marches were blamed by Sinn Féin's Gerry Kelly on Real IRA members orchestrating tension in the area.

== Holy Cross dispute ==
The Holy Cross Girls' School, a Catholic primary school which serves the Ardoyne area but is located in the neighbouring loyalist Upper Ardoyne/Glenbryn area was the sign of tension of 2001 to 2003. Loyalists made claims about harassment by republicans and regarding the use of the school run as a cover for IRA intelligence gathering missions, leading to crowds of protesters blocking the access of pupils to the school. The protests, which included violence directed by loyalist protesters at parents and children alike, were widely covered by the world's media and during the autumn of 2001 sparked a series of sectarian clashes in not only Ardoyne but also the interface between the loyalist Tiger's Bay area and the republican Newington and New Lodge districts.

=== July 12 rioting ===
During the Holy Cross dispute period rioting also took place in Ardoyne on 12 July after an Orange Order parade.

== Murals ==
Like some other working class areas in Belfast, and others in the rest of Northern Ireland, Ardoyne's walls feature a number of murals related to politics and culture, although republican topics have been de-emphasised since 2009. Most of these murals were done by Michael Doherty, an Ardoyne resident.

A mural on Ardoyne Avenue depicted victims of the famine with the legend "An Gorta Mor (The Great Hunger) – They buried us without shroud nor coffin" although this has since been removed. Another depicting a mass rock is still extant on the same street, although a further mural on Ardoyne Avenue showing Cuchulainn and a hound with the legend "Ard-Eoin Fleadh Cheoil" has also been removed. A mural demanding the truth about the killings of Pat Finucane and Rosemary Nelson is also gone. A mural on the street recalling the Holy Cross dispute and comparing it to the Little Rock Nine is recorded by CAIN as still in existence, although it too has been removed. A mural commemorating the Flight of the Earls was one of four painted in the area in 2009 to cover up those of a republican nature.

A number of other murals have also been painted on nearby Berwick Road. A Sinn Féin youth emblem with demands to disband the RUC and free republican prisoners has been removed, along with a portrait of James Connolly. A representation of the Virgin Mary remains in existence. It is close to a mural commemorating the 1916 Easter Rising.

== Culture ==
=== Sport ===
In association football, Ardoyne is close to the home ground of Irish Football League club Cliftonville F.C., and the club has a following in the area. Ardoyne itself is home to Crumlin Star F.C., an intermediate club that currently plays in Northern Amateur Football League Premier Division. They play their home games in Marrowbone Park. Crumlin Star's social club is also a Celtic supporters club, with the Glasgow club enjoying strong popularity in the area and amongst the nationalist community in general.

Shamrock F.C., established in 2006, are based in Ardoyne. They switched from the Belfast and District Football League and since 2014 play in the Northern Amateur Football League. They share Marrowbone Millennium Park with Crumlin Star. The ground received a £4.3 million upgrade in 2024. SDLP's Nichola Mallon fought for the ground to be upgraded for 15 years, and cut the tape at the unveiling.

The Gaelic Athletic Association is also represented in the area through local club Ardoyne Kickhams, who are affiliated to the Antrim GAA.

=== Music ===
The Pride of Ardoyne Flute Band is an Ulster loyalist marching band from the loyalist side of Ardoyne. They participate in the Orange Order marching season's Orange walks, including the 1st of July and 12th of July parades.

The area is home to the annual "Ard Eoin Fleadh Cheoil" (Ardoyne Music Festival). The festival attracts some of the most famous Irish musical acts, including the Wolfe Tones. The Ardoyne Fleadh committee is chaired by Eddie Copeland. In recent years the Ardoyne Fleadh came under fire from Unionists in Belfast after a 'hate speech' was made by a member of headlining bands 'The Druids'. A video from the event shows a member of the band telling the audience that British soldiers in Ireland "should get together with their Orange comrades" and go back to England.

== In popular culture ==
Ardoyne is the setting in which Anna Burns' novels No Bones and Milkman take place. In these novels, she describes a girl growing up in Ardoyne during the Troubles.

The observational documentary Young Plato is set in a primary school in Ardoyne. The film charts the goals of the headmaster of the Holy Cross Boys School.

== See also ==
- The Night We Burned Ardoyne
