= Frank T. Burbrink =

American herpetologist (born 1970)

- Frank Thomas Burbrink
- Born: American
- Citizenship: United States
- Education: University of Illinois Urbana-Champaign (BS, MS); Louisiana State University (PhD)
- Known for: Phylogenomics of Squamata, historical ecology, snake biogeography
- Scientific career
- Fields: Herpetology, Phylogenomics, Evolutionary biology
- Workplaces: American Museum of Natural History; College of Staten Island; Columbia University

Frank Thomas Burbrink usually written as Frank T. Burbrink is an American herpetologist and evolutionary biologist. He serves as the Curator-in-Charge of the Department of Herpetology at the American Museum of Natural History(AMNH) in New York City, where he previously served as Chair of the Division of Vertebrate Zoology. His research focuses on the phylogenomics, speciation, and historical ecology of squamates (snakes and lizards), with emphasis on evolutionary diversification processes.

== Early life and education ==
Burbrink earned a Bachelor of Science (1993) in Ethology, Ecology and Evolution with a minor in Chemistry and a Master of Science in Biology (1995) from the University of Illinois Urbana-Champaign. He completed his Doctor of Philosophy in Zoology and Physiology at Louisiana State University in 2000 under the advisement of Jim McGuire, followed by postdoctoral research at LSU advised by David Pollock.

== Academic career and research ==
Before joining the faculty of the American Museum of Natural History in June 2015, Burbrink served as a professor of biology at the College of Staten Island and the CUNY Graduate Center. He maintains joint faculty appointments at Columbia University, the CUNY Graduate Center, and as Professor Permanente at the Federal University of Rio Grande do Norte in Brazil. He has serves as Associate Editor for Systematic Biology since 2018 and has held editorial roles for Evolution and Herpetologica.

Burbrink's research uses genomic and morphological data along with fossil evidence to examine macroevolutionary patterns and processes in reptiles. His research focuses on the study of snakes, particularly the evolutionary history and biogeography of reptiles. He has led and participated in scientific expeditions in North America, South America, Asia, and Madagascar. His work has covered evolution, phylogeography and species delimitation methods in North American snake complexes (including North American racers, corn snakes, and rat snakes), divergence dating and adaptive radiation. He has authored or co-authored over 140 peer-reviewed articles in scientific journals including Trends in Ecology & Evolution, Systematic Biology, Evolution, Molecular Ecology, and Science Advances.

=== Fieldwork and taxonomic contributions ===
Burbrink has conducted field expeditions in North America, South America, Asia, and Madagascar. There are thirteen taxon names authored by Burbrink including Candoiinae, Maculophis and Pantherophis slowinskii. Herpetoreas burbrinki, an Asian keelback snake described in 2014, was named in his honor.

== Personal life ==
Burbrink is married to matchmaker and author Lisa Clampitt. The couple resides in New York City and has two children.

== Selected publications ==
- Pyron, R. A., Burbrink, F. T., & Wiens, J. J. (2013). A phylogeny and revised classification of Squamata, including 4161 species of lizards and snakes. BMC Evolutionary Biology, 13(1), 93.
- Fujita, M. K., Leaché, A. D., Burbrink, F. T., McGuire, J. A., & Moritz, C. (2012). Coalescent-based species delimitation in an integrative taxonomy. Trends in Ecology & Evolution, 27(9), 480–488.
- Burbrink, F. T., Lawson, R., & Slowinski, J. B. (2000). Mitochondrial DNA phylogeography of the polytypic North American rat snake (Elaphe obsoleta): A critique of the subspecies concept. Evolution, 54(6), 2107–2118.
- Lawson, R., Slowinski, J. B., Crother, B. I., & Burbrink, F. T. (2005). Phylogeny of the Colubroidea (Serpentes): New evidence from mitochondrial and nuclear genes. Molecular Phylogenetics and Evolution, 37(2), 581–601.
- Pyron, R. A., Burbrink, F. T., Colli, G. R., Montes de Oca, A. N., Vitt, L. J., Kuczynski, C. A., & Wiens, J. J. (2011). The phylogeny of advanced snakes (Colubroidea), with discovery of a new subfamily and comparison of support methods for likelihood trees. Molecular Phylogenetics and Evolution, 58(2), 329–342.
- Pyron, R. A., Costa, G. C., Patten, M. A., & Burbrink, F. T. (2015). Phylogenetic niche conservatism and the evolutionary basis of ecological speciation. Biological Reviews, 90(4), 1248–1262.
- Pyron, R. A., & Burbrink, F. T. (2014). Early origin of viviparity and multiple reversions to oviparity in squamate reptiles. Ecology Letters, 17(1), 13–21.
- Burbrink, F. T., Grazziotin, F. G., Pyron, R. A., Cundall, D., Donnellan, S., Irish, F., ... & Zaher, H. (2020). Interrogating genomic-scale data for Squamata (lizards, snakes, and amphisbaenians) shows no support for key traditional morphological relationships. Systematic Biology, 69(3), 502–520.
- Pyron, R. A., & Burbrink, F. T. (2009). Lineage diversification in a widespread species: roles for niche divergence and conservatism in the common kingsnake, Lampropeltis getula. Molecular Ecology, 18(16), 3443–3457.
- Ruane, S., Bryson Jr, R. W., Pyron, R. A., & Burbrink, F. T. (2014). Coalescent species delimitation in milksnakes (genus Lampropeltis) and impacts on phylogenetic comparative analyses. Systematic Biology, 63(2), 231–250
