= Ulverton (novel) =

Book by Adam Thorpe

- First edition
- Author: Adam Thorpe
- Language: English
- Subject: Episodic history of fictional village
- Genre: Historical novel
- Publisher: Martin Secker & Warburg
- Publication date: 1992
- Publication place: United Kingdom
- Media type: Print
- Pages: 272 pp (First edition)
- ISBN: 0-436-52074-5
- OCLC: 28724545

Ulverton is the first novel by British author Adam Thorpe. The work recounts 300 years of history in the fictional village of Ulverton, stylistically representing the literary eras of the day. The novel won the Winifred Holtby Memorial Prize in 1992.
