= On Silbury Hill =

2014 book by Adam Thorpe

- Author: Adam Thorpe
- Language: English
- Genre: Non-fiction
- Publisher: Little Toller Book
- Publication date: 2014

On Silbury Hill is a book by Adam Thorpe published in 2014 by Little Toller Books.

His first work of non-fiction, it is inspired by Silbury Hill and was described by Paul Farley in the Guardian as "a rich and evocative book of place".

The book was featured on BBC Radio 4's Book of the Week programme in August 2014, read by the author. It was shortlisted for the inaugural Wainwright Prize.
