= St Gemma's High School =

Defunct secondary school in Belfast, Northern Ireland

Coordinates: 54.614°N 5.953°W

Information
- School type: Secondary school
- Closed: 2013
- Gender: Girls

St Gemma's High School was a secondary school located on Ardilea Street in Belfast, Northern Ireland. It was within the Belfast Education and Library Board area. Its name originated from the Catholic saint of the Passionist order, Gemma Galgani (1878–1903).

In October 2011, it was announced that the school would face permanent closure in September 2012, due to falling numbers. However, the school stayed open for another year and closed in August 2013.

== Notable alumni ==
- Anna Burns, writer
- Lyra McKee, journalist and writer
