= Winifred Holtby Memorial Prize =

British literary award

The Winifred Holtby Memorial Prize was presented from 1967 until 2003 by the Royal Society of Literature for the best regional novel of the year. It is named after the novelist Winifred Holtby who was noted for her novels set in the rural scenes of her childhood. In 2003 it was superseded by the Ondaatje Prize.

Year	Recipient	Title
2002	Alexandra Fuller	Don't Let's Go to the Dogs Tonight
2001	Anna Burns	No Bones
2000	Donna Morrissey	Kit's Law
1999	Andrew O'Hagan	Our Fathers
1998	Giles Foden	The Last King of Scotland
1997	Eden Robinson	Traplines
1996	Rohinton Mistry	A Fine Balance
1995	Paul Watkins	Archangel
1994	Jim Crace	Signals of Distress
1993	Carl McDougall	The Lights Below
1992	Adam Thorpe	Ulverton
1991	Elspeth Barker	O Caledonia
1990	Nino Ricci	Lives of the Saints
1989	Hilary Mantel	Fludd
1988	Shusha Guppy	The Blindfold Horse
1986	Maggie Hemingway	The Bridge
1984	Balraj Khanna	A Nation of Fools
1983	Graham Swift	Waterland
1982	Kazuo Ishiguro	A Pale View of Hills
1981	Alan Judd	A Breed of Heroes
1980	Elsa Joubert	Poppie
1978	Richard Herley	The Stone Arrow
1977	Anita Desai	Fire on the Mountain
1976	Eugene McCabe	Victims
1975	Jane Gardam	Black Faces, White Faces
1974	Graham King	The Pandora Valley
1973	Ronald Harwood	Articles of Faith
1973	Peter Tinniswood	I Didn't Know You Cared
1971	John Stewart	Last Cool Days
1970	Shiva Naipaul	Fireflies
1969	Ian McDonald	The Humming-Bird Tree
1968	Catherine Cookson	The Round Tower
1967	David Bean	The Big Meeting
