= Nick Drnaso =

American author and graphic novelist

- Born: Palos Hills, Illinois, U.S.
- Area: Graphic novelist
- Awards: Los Angeles Times Book Prize for Graphic Novel, 2016; Angoulême International Comics Festival Prize for First Comic Book, 2018

Nick Drnaso (/dərˈnæsoʊ/) is an American cartoonist and illustrator, best known for his books Beverly (2016) and Sabrina (2018). Sabrina is the first graphic novel ever nominated for a Man Booker Prize, in 2018. His third book is Acting Class (2022).

== Early life and education ==
Nick Drnaso grew up in a working-class environment.

He became interested in making comics when he was in community college. He then attended Columbia College Chicago, where he majored in illustration.

== Career ==
Drnaso was mentored by cartoonist Ivan Brunetti. Early influences on Drnaso included Robert Crumb and the filmmaker Todd Solondz. Later influences included Julie Doucet and Henry Darger.

His first graphic novel was Beverly, published by Drawn and Quarterly in 2016.

The second, Sabrina, followed in 2018. Sabrina was nominated for a Man Booker Prize, becoming the first graphic novel to be nominated for the prestigious award in its history.

His third book is Acting Class (2022).

== Personal life ==
Drnaso lives in Chicago with his wife, Sarah Leitten (also a cartoonist), and their three cats.

== Awards ==
Year	Title	Award	Category	Result	Ref.
2012	"Keith or Steve"	Ignatz Award	Story	Nominated	
2014	"The Grassy Knoll"	Ignatz Award	Story	Nominated	
2016	Beverly	Ignatz Award	Collection	Nominated	
2016	Beverly	Los Angeles Times Book Prize	Graphic Novel	Won	
2018	Sabrina	Booker Prize	—	Longlisted	
2018	Sabrina	Center for Fiction First Novel Prize	—	Longlisted	
2019	Sabrina	Orwell Prize	Political Fiction	Shortlisted	

- 2018
  - Angoulême International Comics Festival Prize for First Comic Book for Beverly
- 2019
  - (finalist) Young Lions Fiction Award for Sabrina
- 2023 (finalist) PEN/Jean Stein Book Award for Acting Class

== Bibliography ==
- Beverly. Drawn and Quarterly. 2016. ISBN 9781770462250.
- Sabrina. Drawn and Quarterly. 2018. ISBN 9781770463165.
- Acting Class. Drawn and Quarterly. 2022. ISBN 9781770464926.
