= Sophie Mackintosh =

British writer (born 1988)

- Born: 1988 (age 37–38); Wales
- Education: University of Warwick
- Occupation: Writer
- Writing career
- Language: English
- Genres: Fiction, short stories
- Notable work: The Water Cure (novel)
- Website: sophiemackintosh.co.uk

Sophie Mackintosh (born 1988) is a British novelist and short story writer. Her debut novel, The Water Cure, was nominated for the 2018 Man Booker Prize. In 2023, she was named on the Granta Best of Young British Novelists list, compiled every 10 years since 1983, identifying the 20 most significant British novelists aged under 40.

== Biography ==
Mackintosh was born in South Wales and grew up in Pembrokeshire, and attended Ysgol y Preseli, a Welsh language school in Crymych. When she started writing, her initial focus was on poetry. She eventually gravitated towards prose fiction, which she has combined with holding various jobs during her 20s.

She is bilingual, and cites Welsh mythology and Angela Carter as influences. Mackintosh enjoys running and eating.

== Books ==
Mackintosh's first novel The Water Cure was released in May 2018. According to The Guardian's review, the novel exposes the parts of real life that are usually not confronted in the world. British book editor Hermione Thompson who works for Penguin books and published the novel, wrote about the novel, “The Water Cure is an astonishing novel: it unfolds seductively, like a dream (or a nightmare), yet speaks urgently to the concerns of our own world. It heralds the arrival of a radical new voice in literary fiction.”

Her second novel, Blue Ticket, was published in September 2020. It is a work of dystopian science fiction set in a future in which women are only allowed to become mothers through a lottery of blue and white tickets. The Times called it "gripping, ethereal."

Her third novel, Cursed Bread, published in March 2023, is set around the 1951 Pont-Saint-Esprit mass poisoning. According to The Telegraph, it is "shimmering fever-dream of a novel."

== Awards and honours ==
In 2023, Mackintosh's was named on the Granta Best of Young British Novelists list, compiled every 10 years since 1983, identifying the 20 most significant British novelists aged under 40.

Awards for Mackintosh's writing
Year	Title	Award	Category	Result	Ref.
2016	Grace	The White Review Short Story Prize	—	Winner	
2016	"The Running Ones"	Virago / Stylist Short Story Prize	—	Winner	
2017	"Holiday with T"	Berlin Writing Prize	—	Shortlist	
2018	The Water Cure	Man Booker Prize	—	Longlist	
2019	The Water Cure	Collyer Bristow Prize	—	Shortlist	
2023	Cursed Bread	Women's Prize for Fiction	—	Longlist	

== Works ==
=== Novels ===
- The Water Cure (2018), Hamish Hamilton
- Blue Ticket (2020), Hamish Hamilton
- Cursed Bread (2023), Hamish Hamilton
- Permanence (2026), Hamish Hamilton

=== Short stories ===
- "The Last Rite of the Body" (2019), Granta
- "New Dawn Fades"' (2018), in the anthology We Were Strangers: Short Stories Inspired by Unknown Pleasures edited by Richard V. Hirst (Configo Publishing)
- "Revivalists" (2018), The Stinging Fly
- "Self Improvement" (2018), The White Review
- "Holiday with T" (2017), Home is Elsewhere: The 2017 Berlin Writing Prize Anthology
- "What I Am Afraid Of" (2017), Five Dials
- "Grace" (2016), The White Review
- "The Running Ones" (2016), Stylist
- "The Weak Spot" (2016), Granta
- "Lacrimosa" (2025), Folding Rock

=== Critical studies and reviews of Mackintosh's work ===
- Miller, Laura (7 January 2019). "The purge : The Water Cure is a twisted fairy tale of toxic masculinity". The Critics. Books. The New Yorker. 94 (43): 68–69.

=== Interviews ===
- "Creatives in profile: interview with Sophie Mackintosh”, Nothing in the Rulebook (October 2019)
