= Patti Stanger =

American matchmaker, businesswoman, and television personality

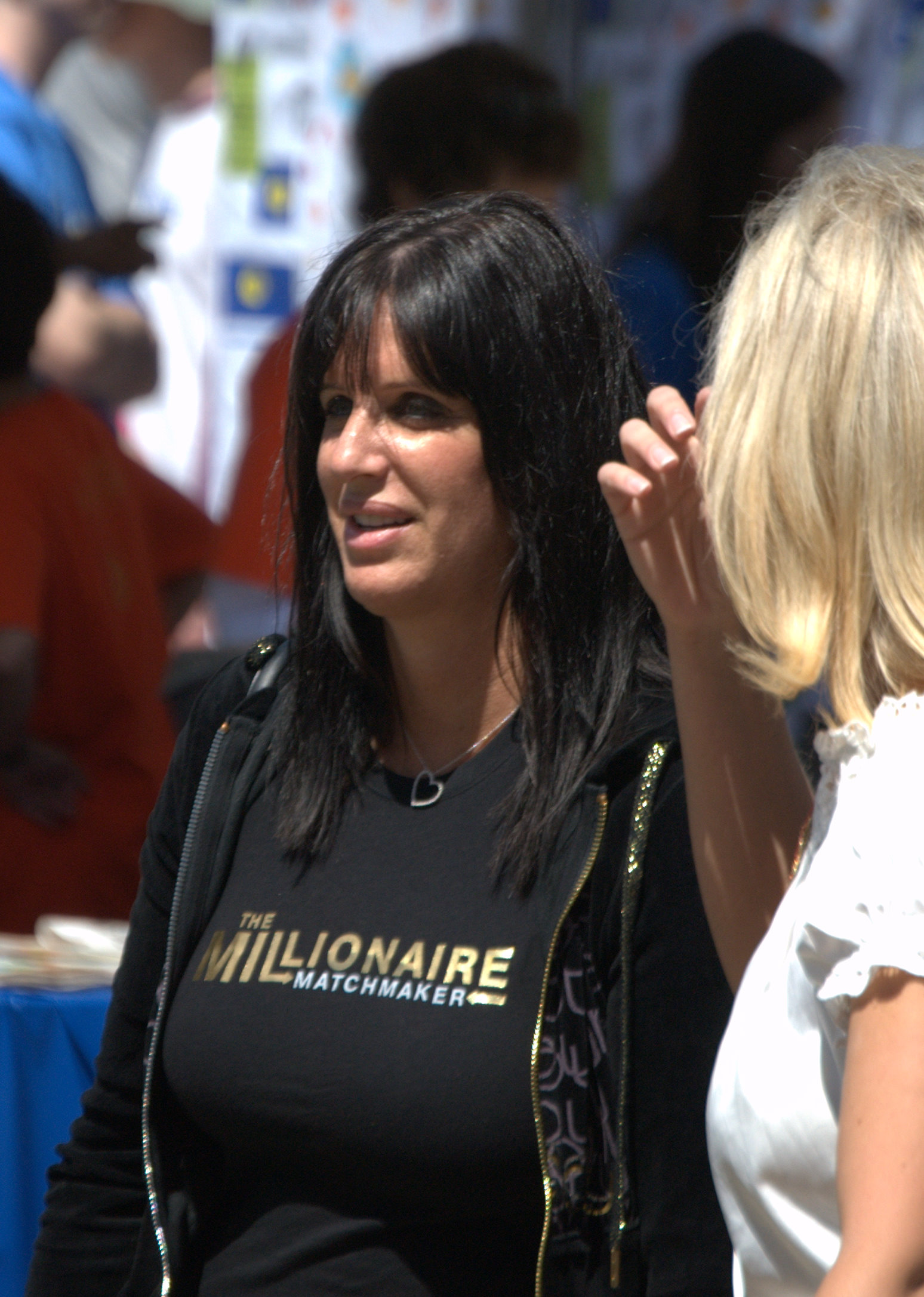
- Stanger in 2009
- Born: May 31, 1961 (age 65); Short Hills, New Jersey, U.S.
- Education: Millburn High School
- Alma mater: University of Miami (BFA)
- Occupations: Businesswoman, television producer and personality, radio hostess
- Years active: 2002–present
- Known for: The Millionaire Matchmaker
- Partner(s): Andy Friedman (2003–10); David Krause (2012–15)

Patricia Stanger (born May 31, 1961) is an American businesswoman, reality television personality, and founder and CEO of matchmaking service Millionaire's Club International. She is known for starring in and producing her own matchmaking reality series, The Millionaire Matchmaker, on Bravo.

== Early life and education ==
Stanger was born and raised in Short Hills, New Jersey. She was adopted by matchmaker Rhoda and Ira Stanger, and was raised in the Jewish faith. She graduated from Millburn High School in 1979 and received a Bachelor of Fine Arts from the University of Miami in 1983. She currently lives in Los Angeles.

== Career ==
=== Early career ===
Stanger is a third-generation matchmaker, raised by a family that practiced the Orthodox Jewish system of shidduch. Prior to founding her business in January 2000, she worked as the Director of Marketing for Great Expectations.

She also worked in fashion. Stanger was introduced to the fashion industry by Janis Spindel, who had hired and scouted the 24-year-old when looking for an assistant. Stanger worked for 10 years in the fashion industry at Unionbay Sportswear, JouJou Jeans, and Saks Fifth Avenue.

=== Millionaire's Club ===
In 2000, Stanger stated that "successful men in the dating arena needed a private, exclusive club where they could come to find their beautiful and intelligent wives." In 2000, Stanger founded Millionaire's Club International Inc., a professional matchmaking service. In 1999, matchmaker and author Lisa Clampitt served as the East Coast Director for Stanger's Millionaire's Club.

=== Millionaire Matchmaker ===
In 2008, Stanger signed a deal to have her own reality show called Millionaire Matchmaker on the Bravo TV Network. Stanger starred in and produced the show.

The hour-long show followed her matchmaking at Millionaire's Club. Each episode featured her matchmaking two millionaires. First, millionaire clients submitted a biographical video profile on a DVD describing the type of partner they want. Stanger then met them individually to better understand their desires and welcome them to the club. She's been called "The Simon Cowell of Dating" and made very quick, very direct comments. "I am not paid to hide my true feelings," she said. Her "casting calls" or "recruiting sessions", where she screened men and women, involved her making brutal comments on their dress and appearance. She told one woman she had a beautiful face but could not meet her millionaire because she was 10–15 lbs overweight. "I can't do much for women over 45," Stanger said in an interview, "and if they're overweight, it's almost impossible." She told another woman to take off her wig, then suggested she come back after she got hair extensions.

The millionaires and 30–40 potential dates would first meet at a cocktail party Stanger hosted called a "VIP mixer", where they mingled and the millionaires got to evaluate the candidates. The millionaires chose their top two candidates and had 10-minute "mini dates", after which they picked the candidate they liked best. Stanger announced the choices to the group, and then the millionaires set up their "master dates".

The Millionaire's Club has a few rules. For example, millionaires cannot discuss sex or trade phone numbers at the mixer. No sex is allowed until the couple is in an "exclusive, committed, monogamous relationship". There is also a two-drink maximum enforced on each date. If a millionaire violates the terms of the club, then Patti can throw him or her out of the club.

At the end of each episode, Stanger called each candidate chosen for their master date, after which Patti called each millionaire or invites him or her into her office to discuss how the date went.

The show would conclude with updates on each couple, indicating whether they are still together or not.

The show ran from January 22, 2008 – March 29, 2015.

In 2022, the Jewish Journal named Stanger one of "The Top 10 Jewish Reality TV Stars of All Time."

=== Radio ===
In April 2009, Stanger was hired by Clear Channel subsidiary Premiere Radio Networks to host a 4-week special titled P.S. I Love You for XM Satellite Radio. The live call-in program was simulcast on Clear Channel owned MIX channel 22 and The Pink Channel on channel 24, Sunday evenings. After a month's hiatus, the program was returned to the schedule on a semi-regular basis, until it was moved to Thursday evenings in July 2009 and made a permanent fixture. Stanger continues to host P.S. I Love You on Thursday nights from 4 PM to 6 PM Pacific time on both Mix and The Pink Channel.

== Personal life ==
In 2003, Stanger started dating Andy Friedman, a real-estate executive whom she met through another matchmaker. On July 22, 2009, Lalate.com announced that Friedman had proposed on May 31, her birthday. They did not agree on a date for the wedding, although episodes of season three of The Millionaire Matchmaker showed Stanger engaged in wedding planning activities, and she spoke openly to the media about details of the wedding.

On August 14, 2010, Stanger announced via Twitter that she was ending her relationship with Friedman, stating, "I just ended my relationship with Andy. It hit me really hard that I want kids in my life. You have to agree on the non-negotiables." She has also stated in the season 5 finale of Millionaire Matchmaker that Friedman was like a "best friend" to her and that passion was lacking in their relationship.

After she was matched on her own show, Patti started seeing John Matthews, the man she picked. In the Millionaire Matchmaker Reunion show however, she said the two of them were just friends.

Stanger's first book on dating was published in 2009. It is entitled Become Your Own Matchmaker: 8 Easy Steps for Attracting Your Perfect Mate.

In February 2012, she was one of a group of celebrities who walked a catwalk in red dresses for the "Heart Truth Red Dress Collection" show, part of New York Fashion Week. She wore a Marc Bouwer dress.

== Controversial comments ==
On September 25, 2011, during a taping of Watch What Happens Live hosted by Andy Cohen, Stanger made some controversial remarks. When responding to a question from a gay man about a long-distance open relationship, she said, "There is no curbing you people." She later told a viewer who Skyped in, "You are very handsome, I thought you were straight." She went on to explain that she meant he was not "queen-y". Stanger also made comments about Jewish men and smart women that viewers and critics deemed offensive.

These comments quickly drew many angry responses on Twitter. Bravo and Stanger issued apologies with Stanger tweeting, "I am so sorry. I did not mean to offend anyone with my comments last night on Watch What Happens Live.”

== Television work ==
Year	Title	Role	Notes
2002	The Anna Nicole Show	Herself / Millionaires Club Matchmaker	2 episodes
2008–2015	The Millionaire Matchmaker	Host and executive producer	Main role
2011	Married in a Year	Host, writer and producer	
2011	Drop Dead Diva	Marcie LaRose	Episode: "Toxic"
2011, 2014	Days of Our Lives	Herself	2 episodes
2016	Sharknado: The 4th Awakens	Marley Craig	TV movie
2016–2017	Million Dollar Matchmaker	Host and executive producer	Main role
2017	Dr. Phil	Herself	Episode: "Abducted Twice, Brainwashed and Molested: Actress Jan Broberg's Story"
2017	Hollywood Medium	Herself	Episode: "Todd & Julie Chrisley/Patti Stanger/Adrienne Palicki"
2024	Patti Stanger: The Matchmaker	Co-host and executive producer	
2024	Hell's Kitchen	Herself	Red team's Chef's table guest diner; Episode: "Harmony in Hell"

== Radio work ==
- P.S. I Love You – host (2009–present)

== Published works ==
- Stanger, Patti; Johnson Mandell, Lisa (2009). Become Your Own Matchmaker: 8 Easy Steps for Attracting Your Perfect Mate. Atria Books. ISBN 978-1416597711.. Atria Books is a division of Simon & Schuster.
