= The Night We Burned Ardoyne =

Ulster loyalist song

"The Night We Burned Ardoyne" is an Ulster loyalist song.

It refers to the events of August 1969 when there were large-scale attacks in Ardoyne, a largely Catholic/Irish nationalist area in north Belfast, which saw many houses burnt out.

It is sung to the tune of "Forty Shades of Green".

It has been recorded on CD by The Bluenotes and The Thornlie Boys. Both versions have slightly different words but are still mostly the same.

== Lyrics ==
I have often thought and wondered, what the outcome might have been,
If the army hadn't came in, to protect those scum in green,
Well they shouted all their insults, they threw their petrol bombs and shout,
But on the sixteenth night of August, we should have shot the lot.

Well, I remember Derry, Aughrim, Enniskillen, and the Boyne,
But still fresh in my memory is the night we burnt Ardoyne,
We chased those Fenian gunmen, down Hooker Street they tore,
And they sang the song we loved so well, "The Sash My Father Wore".

Now they cried out "God please help us,"
"Please send the army in,"
And they got down and they pleaded with a bishop called McGuin.
So listen, all you Fenians, you rebels to the core,
The next time you start trouble then Ardoyne will be no more.

Now loyalists I beg you, please come and take a stand
Against this force of evil, against this Papish band
For we are all united, and we never will be down
With Ulster's flag still flying, the Red Hand and the crown.

I remember Derry, Aughrim, Enniskillen, and the Boyne,
But still fresh in my memory is the night we burnt Ardoyne,
We chased those Fenian gunmen, down Hooker Street they tore,
And they sang the song we loved so well, "The Sash My Father Wore".
And they sang the song we loved so well, "The Sash My Father Wore".
