= Clampett (disambiguation) =

Clampett may refer to:

- The Bob Clampett Show, program on the Cartoon Network
- The Ballad of Jed Clampett, theme song for the television series The Beverly Hillbillies, which ran from 1962 to 1971
- Jed Clampett, fictional character played by Buddy Ebsen on the American comedy television series The Beverly Hillbillies

== Surname ==
- Bob Clampett (1913–1984), American animator
- Bobby Clampett (b. 1960), American television golf analyst and former PGA Tour golfer
- Katelyn Clampett, American country singer-songwriter

== See also ==
- Clampitt, a surname
