= Lisa Clampitt =

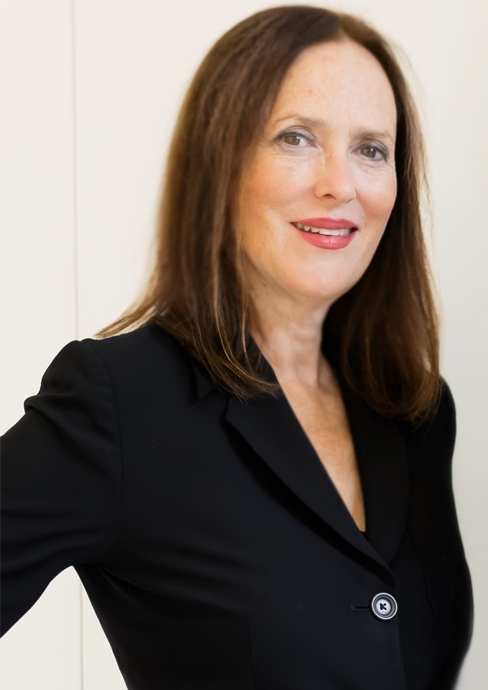
- Born: 24 February 1964 (age 62); New York City
- Education: New York University (BA) University of Michigan (MSW)

Lisa Clampitt (born in 1964) is an American matchmaker, author, and former social worker. She is the founder of the matchmaking firm Lisa Clampitt Matchmaking (originally established as VIP Life) and the founder of the Global Love Institute (formerly the Matchmaking Institute), a professional training and certification organization for matchmakers.

== Early life and education ==
Clampitt was raised in New York City. She completed her undergraduate education at New York University (NYU), where she received a Bachelor of Arts in Dramatic Literature. She subsequently earned a Master of Social Work (MSW) from the University of Michigan. She holds a Licensed Master of Social Work (LMSW) credential in New York State.

== Career ==
=== Social work and journalism ===
Following her graduate studies, Clampitt spent over a decade working as a pediatric social worker in New York City, including roles counseling families at Bellevue Hospital. Her father, Robert H. Clampitt (died 1996), was an attorney and the founder of Children's Express, a non-profit youth journalism organization. After the death of her father in 1996, Children's Express faced severe financial liabilities and ceased their operations. In 2001, Clampitt partnered with a business investor to launch a private matchmaking venture, securing capital to restructure and revive her father's nonprofit mission. The operation was rebranded as Children's PressLine, a non-profit youth journalism entity that trained children and teenage reporters to create syndicated news content. The organization's archival collections spanning from 1970 to 2011 were later preserved by the Library of Congress.

=== Matchmaking industry and entrepreneurship ===
Clampitt began her career in the relationship sector in 1999, serving as the East Coast Director for celebrity matchmaker Patti Stanger's Millionaire's Club. In 2001, she applied her behavioral screening methods to launch her own matchmaking firm, VIP Life (later renamed Lisa Clampitt Matchmaking). Her methodology integrated psychological assessment and interview techniques to evaluate client compatibility.

In 2003 Clampitt founded the Matchmaking Institute (subsequently rebranded as the Global Love Institute). The organization was established as a professional trade association to provide training, codes of conduct, and business resources for independent matchmakers and dating coaches. The institute later secured authorization from the New York State Department of Education to grant formal completion certificates to its students.

Through the institute Clampitt advocated for an industry framework known as "collaborative matchmaking," which encouraged independent operators to co-reference client networks and cooperate across regional jurisdictions. She also authored an international code of ethics for the organization to standardize member guidelines regarding client confidentiality, vetting protocols, and fee transparency. The institute has since expanded its training frameworks and networking conferences to relationship professionals internationally.

== Personal life ==
Clampitt is married to Frank T. Burbrink, a herpetologist and curator at the American Museum of Natural History. The couple resides in New York City and has two children.

== Publications ==
- "Matchmaking from Fun to Profit: The Complete Guide to Turning Your Love for Matchmaking into a Lucrative Business" (2008). Skyhorse Publishing. ISBN 978-1602391109
- "Make Me a Match: The 21st Century Guide to Finding and Using a Matchmaker" (2007). Skyhorse Publishing. ISBN 978-1602391758
- "Matchmaking 101 – Office Hours with Lisa Clampitt" (2013–2016). Recurring column for Patti Knows.
