= Adam Thorpe =

British poet and novelist (born 1956)

- Born: 5 December 1956 (age 69); Paris, France
- Occupations: novelist, poet, playwright, translator, reviewer
- Writing career
- Period: 1988–present

Adam Thorpe (born 5 December 1956) is a British poet and novelist whose works also include short stories, translations, radio dramas and documentaries. He is a frequent contributor of reviews and articles to various newspapers, journals and magazines, including the Guardian, the Poetry Review and the Times Literary Supplement.

== Career ==
Adam Thorpe was born in Paris and grew up in India, Cameroon and England. Graduating from Oxford's Magdalen College in 1979, he founded a touring theatre company, then settled in London to teach drama and English literature. He married Joanna Wistreich, an English teacher, in 1985; they had three children, and they now live in France.

His writing has garnered recognition throughout his career, and has been translated into many languages. His first collection of poetry, Mornings in the Baltic (1988), was shortlisted that year for the Whitbread Poetry Award. His first novel, Ulverton (1992), an episodic work covering 350 years of English rural history, won critical acclaim worldwide, including that of the novelist John Fowles, who reviewed it in The Guardian as:

"...the most interesting first novel I have read these last years".

The novel was awarded the Winifred Holtby Memorial Prize for 1992.

Karl Ove Knausgård, author of the internationally acclaimed bestseller My Struggle, stated during a reading in Washington DC that, "My favourite... English novel is by Adam Thorpe called Ulverton... a brilliant, very, very good and very unBritish novel... It's magic, a magic book."

Hilary Mantel has recently written: "There is no contemporary I admire more than Adam Thorpe, whose novel Ulverton is a late twentieth century masterpiece."

In 2007 Thorpe was shortlisted for prizes in three respective genres: the Forward Poetry Prize, the BBC National Short Story Award and the South Bank Show Award for the year's best novel (Between Each Breath). His novel Hodd (2009), a darker version of the Robin Hood legend in the form of a medieval document, was shortlisted for the inaugural Walter Scott Prize for Historical Fiction in 2010. His sixth poetry collection, Voluntary (2012), was a Poetry Book Society Recommendation.

His 2012 novel, the literary thriller Flight, was described by D. J. Taylor in the Guardian as confirming "a long-held impression that Thorpe is one of the most underrated writers on the planet."

Thorpe started his career as an actor, and is the author of many BBC radio dramas starring, among others, Tara Fitzgerald, Sian Phillips and Patrick Malahide; his one-stage play, Couch Grass and Ribbon, written almost entirely in Berkshire dialect, was performed at the Watermill Theatre, Berkshire, in 1996.

Using period language, he has translated two great nineteenth-century French novels for Vintage Classics: Flaubert's Madame Bovary and Zola's Thérèse Raquin.

His first work of non-fiction, On Silbury Hill, described by Paul Farley in the Guardian as "a rich and evocative book of place", was Book of the Week on Radio 4 in August 2014.

== Works ==
=== Poetry ===
- Mornings in the Baltic (Secker and Warburg, 1988)
- Meeting Montaigne (Secker, 1990)
- From the Neanderthal (Cape, 1999)
- Nine Lessons from the Dark (Cape, 2003)
- Birds with a Broken Wing (Cape, 2007)
- Voluntary (Cape, 2012)
- Words from the Wall (Cape, 2019)

=== Novels ===
- Ulverton (Secker, 1992; Vintage Classics, 2010)
- Still (Secker, 1995)
- Pieces of Light (Cape, 1998)
- Nineteen Twenty-One (Cape, 2001)
- No Telling (Cape, 2003)
- The Rules of Perspective (Cape, 2005)
- Between Each Breath (Cape, 2007)
- The Standing Pool (Cape, 2008)
- Hodd (Cape, 2009)
- Flight (Cape, 2012)
- Missing Fay (Cape, 2017)

=== Short story collections ===
- Shifts (Cape, 2000)
- Is This the Way You Said? (Cape, 2006)

=== Non-fiction ===
- On Silbury Hill (Little Toller, 2014)
- Notes from the Cévennes (Bloomsbury, 2018)

=== Translation ===
- Madame Bovary (Vintage Classics, 2011)
- Thérèse Raquin (Vintage Classics, 2013)

=== Radio dramas ===
- The Fen Story (1991)
- Offa's Daughter (1993)
- Couch Grass and Ribbon (1996)
- An Envied Place (2002)
- Nought Happens Twice Thus (2003)
- Himmler's Boy (2004)

=== Prizes and awards ===
- 1985 Eric Gregory Award, for poetry
- 1988 Whitbread Award, for poetry, shortlist, Mornings in the Baltic
- 1992 Winifred Holtby Memorial Prize, for best work of regional literature, Ulverton
- 2007 Forward Poetry Prize, for Best Poetry Collection of the Year, shortlist, Birds with a Broken Wing
- 2010 Walter Scott Prize, for historical fiction, shortlist, Hodd
