= No Bones =

2001 novel by Anna Burns

- Author: Anna Burns
- Language: English
- Publisher: Norton
- Publication date: May 1, 2001
- Publication place: Northern Ireland
- Pages: 272
- Awards: Winifred Holtby Memorial Prize (2001)
- ISBN: 0-393-32303-X

No Bones is a novel by Irish author Anna Burns, published in 2001 by Norton. Set in a small, Northern Irish community, it follows a young girl growing up during The Troubles.

The book received positive reviews from critics. It won the Winifred Holtby Memorial Prize and was shortlisted for the 2002 Women's Prize for Fiction.

== Summary ==
Set in Ardoyne, the narrative follows Amelia, a young girl growing up during The Troubles.

== Reception ==
No Bones received mostly positive reviews from critics. Kirkus Reviews described the book as "an unforgiving tale of the loss of innocence, for a girl and her country." Publishers Weekly gave a mixed review, praising the book's "early promise" but criticising the second half of the narrative.

In a retrospective review, The Irish Times described Burns' prose as "brilliant".

Booklist also reviewed the novel.

== Awards ==
No Bones won the 2001 Winifred Holtby Memorial Prize.

It was shortlisted for the Women's Prize for Fiction in 2002.
