= Milkman (novel) =

2018 novel by Anna Burns

- First edition
- Author: Anna Burns
- Audio read by: Bríd Brennan
- Language: English
- Subject: stalker • gossip • family tension • homosexuality • escapism • marginalization • societal expectation • criminal harassment
- Genre: Literary fiction
- Publisher: Faber & Faber
- Publication date: 17 May 2018
- Publication place: United Kingdom
- Media type: Print (hardcover, paperback), ebook, kindle, audiobook
- Pages: 368 pp
- ISBN: 9780571338740
- OCLC: 1066115046
- Dewey Decimal: 823/.92
- LC Class: PR6102.U76 M55 2019

Milkman is a 2018 historical psychological fiction novel written by the Northern Irish author Anna Burns. Set during the Troubles in Northern Ireland, the story follows an 18-year-old girl, "middle sister", who is harassed by an older married man known as "the milkman" and then as "Milkman". It is Burns's first novel to be published after Little Constructions in 2007 and is her third overall.

Milkman received strongly positive reviews, with critics mostly praising the book's narration, atmosphere, humour, and its complex portrayal of Northern Irish sociopolitics. Milkman won several awards, including the 2018 Man Booker Prize, marking the first time a Northern Irish writer has been awarded the prize. The novel also won the 2018 National Book Critics Circle Award for Fiction as well as the 2020 International Dublin Literary Award. As of 2019, the novel has sold in excess of 540,000 copies.

== Plot ==
Milkman is set in Northern Ireland during the 1970s, at the height of the Troubles. The narrator is an unnamed 18-year-old girl, known as middle sister, living in an unnamed city sympathetic to the republican cause. Milkman, a high-ranking paramilitary officer, takes an interest in the girl, beginning to stalk her and offer her unwanted car rides. Rumours spread that the girl is having an affair with the married Milkman, straining her relationship with her mother and the wider community. These rumours compound as the girl continues her relationship with her "maybe-boyfriend," who she has been dating for a year but struggles to commit to.

As Milkman's stalking becomes more intense, he makes veiled threats of killing maybe-boyfriend if she does not break up with him. The girl becomes more withdrawn and she and maybe-boyfriend drift apart. When the girl meets with her "longest friend from primary school," her friend suggests the girl's oblivious behavior, particularly "reading-while-walking," has led her to become a social pariah and thus enabled the rumours. During this meeting, the girl is poisoned by "tablets girl," a mentally ill local woman. The girl becomes severely sick, but recovers. Tablets girl is found murdered soon after, and the community assumes Milkman killed her as revenge for harming the narrator, further souring her reputation within the community.

The girl and maybe-boyfriend break up over a tense phone call. The girl goes to his house to reconcile, but discovers he is in love with and more committed to his best friend. Resigning herself to her fate, the girl finally accepts a ride from Milkman back to her house. Milkman promises to take her on a date the next evening. However, that morning, Milkman is shot and killed by British security forces. While the girl is at a club, she is ambushed in the bathroom by another intermittent stalker, Somebody McSomebody, who threatens to kill her. The girl is saved by the other women in the bathroom beating him up. With her stalkers no longer troubling her, the girl's life returns to a state of normality.

== Themes ==
=== Politics ===
In Milkman, everyday behaviours, even non-political ones, are politicised. The protagonist's maybe-boyfriend shows off the supercharger from a rare antique Bentley (a blower) he has acquired to his neighbours, only to be marginalised when one person in the room inquires about who among his garage-mates got the piece of the car that had the flag from "across the water", suggesting that he (and all the mechanics he works with) are traitors for even touching some part of such a car.

The protagonist's desire to avoid political matters is shown by both her refusal to use character names and her reading-while-walking (quite literally burying her head in a book to emancipate herself from the reality of the Troubles). Her reading-while-walking tragically manifests itself as a rumour that she is having an affair with Milkman. As whenever other characters fail to understand a behaviour (such as the protagonist's preference for literature over politics) it still becomes politicised through their own interpretations of otherwise mundane facets of life.

== Background ==
While Burns initially expected to write the novel in three weeks, she eventually finished Milkman over a period of ten months, during which time she ran out of money and had to claim benefits. Milkman was based on Burns's own experiences growing up in Belfast during the Troubles, and she has identified the novel's unnamed setting as "a distorted version of Belfast", though it could also stand in for "any sort of totalitarian, closed society existing in similarly oppressive conditions".

== Reception ==
=== Critical response ===
Writing for The Washington Post, Ron Charles described the novel as "challenging" but "rewarding", and Dwight Garner panned the book as "rarely seizing upon any sort of clarity or emotional resonance" in a review for The New York Times. In Literary Review, John Self acknowledged that the novel's evasiveness and lack of unified plot is challenging for the reader, yet praised Burns for the "otherworldly" version of Northern Ireland her narrator is able to convey: "a threatening fairy-tale setting where people define themselves in opposition to those 'over the border', 'over the water' or simply 'over the road'".

=== Accolades ===
The novel won the 2018 Booker Prize. Kwame Anthony Appiah, Chair of Judges, commented:

The language of Anna Burns’ Milkman is simply marvellous; beginning with the distinctive and consistently realised voice of the funny, resilient, astute, plain-spoken, first-person protagonist. From the opening page her words pull us into the daily violence of her world — threats of murder, people killed by state hit squads — while responding to the everyday realities of her life as a young woman, negotiating a way between the demands of family, friends and lovers in an unsettled time. The novel delineates brilliantly the power of gossip and social pressure in a tight-knit community, and shows how both rumour and political loyalties can be put in the service of a relentless campaign of individual sexual harassment. Burns draws on the experience of Northern Ireland during the Troubles to portray a world that allows individuals to abuse the power granted by a community to those who resist the state on their behalf. Yet this is never a novel about just one place or time. The local is in service to an exploration of the universal experience of societies in crisis.

==== Literary prizes ====
Year	Award	Result	Ref
2018	Booker Prize	Won	
2018	National Book Critics Circle Award for Fiction	Won	
2019	BookTube Prize for Fiction	Octofinalist	
2019	Orwell Prize for Political Fiction	Won	
2019	Rathbones Folio Prize	Shortlisted	
2019	Women's Prize For Fiction	Shortlisted	
2020	International Dublin Literary Award	Won	

==== In foreign translation ====
Year	Award	Result	Ref
2020	Yasnaya Polyana Literary Award - Foreign Literature	Won	

==== Audio ====
Year	Award	Result	Ref
2019	British Book Awards for Audiobook: Fiction	Shortlisted	
