= Children's Express =

Child news agency

Children’s Express was a news agency reported and edited by children and teenagers between the ages of 8 and 18.

== History ==
CE was founded in 1975 in New York by Wall Street attorney Robert Clampitt. Initially, CE published light and fluffy stories in its own magazine. However, in 1976 at the Democratic National Convention, the focus of the organization changed forever when a 13-year-old CE reporter (Gilbert Giles) scooped the news that Walter Mondale would be Jimmy Carter's running mate. From then on, CE reporters would almost exclusively concentrate on hard-hitting political and social topics.

Over the next two decades, Children's Express expanded from New York to establish bureaus in Salem, Massachusetts, Washington, D.C., Oakland, California, Newark, New Jersey, Harlem, New York, Marquette, Michigan, Springfield, Ohio and Indianapolis, Indiana. In 1994 CE-UK was established; a Tokyo bureau was also founded in the late 1990s.

CE articles appeared both in local markets and in national publications that subscribed to the CP Newswire, including the New York Amsterdam News, Bermuda Royal Gazette, The Indianapolis Star, The Mining Journal, The New York Times, New York Daily News, The Plain Dealer, Family Life, Houston Chronicle, El Diario La Prensa, The Seattle Times, Maryland Sentinel and many others.

From 1988 to 1989, the CE News Magazine television series was broadcast on PBS during prime time. CE won a Peabody Award and an Emmy Award for their coverage of the 1988 presidential campaign. This episode included one of CE's most famous interviews, in which 11-year-old reporter Suki Cheong asked vice-presidential candidate Dan Quayle if a girl should be forced to carry a baby to term if she was sexually molested by her father. Quayle's answer: yes.

Children's Express articles were created through an oral journalism process: interviews and commentary by 8- to 13-year-old reporters were transcribed and edited by teen and adult editors. CE articles were always presented from a youth viewpoint, and featured frank, uncensored commentary. Subjects covered ran the gamut from teen drug abuse to abortion, youth-oriented legislation, divorce, school violence and interracial dating. Reporters and editors from CE's Washington DC bureau were admitted to White House press briefings. CE also covered every presidential election and Democratic/Republican National Convention from 1976-2000. In 1996, three CE-NY staffers toured war-torn Bosnia, sending back reports that were published nationally.

When founder Robert Clampitt died suddenly in 1996, CE was already teetering on the edge of bankruptcy. In fact, the board of directors had scheduled a meeting to decide how to close the organization when new management secured a multimillion-dollar foundation grant to develop the organization and to undertake a major diversity research project. But with a flawed business model and increasing pressures on foundations and other funders brought about by 9/11, further funding proved impossible to obtain. By the year 2001, after a desperate struggle and with a bitterly divided board, the organization ceased operations. It became a textbook example of why nonprofits need succession plans.

== Aftermath ==
The Indianapolis bureau split from Children's Express in 1999 and began operating as Y-Press, which continued operations until 2012. After Children's Express folded, two of the other bureaus also evolved into independent youth news organizations. The New York bureau became known as Children's Pressline (which closed in 2010), while the Marquette group continued on as 8-18 Media.

The UK Children's Express, which was run and funded separately, continued on under the CE name. On January 30, 2007, the organization changed its name to Headliners.

== Awards and honors ==
- Pulitzer Prize (nomination), 1982
- George Foster Peabody Award, 1988
- Emmy Award, 1988
- Casey Medal for Meritorious Journalism, 1994

== Books ==
- Listen to Us! (1979) A collection of roundtable interviews with children on topics ranging from school to sexual abuse.
- When I was Young I Loved School: Dropping Out and Hanging In (1989) Children's Express' exploration of school apathy and dropouts in America.
- Voices from the Future (1993) Voices of kids from across America, talking about violence and its impact on their lives.
- Kids Voices Count (1994) Monologues of at-risk youth from across America talking about their live experiences dealing with violence, school, sexuality and homelessness.
- I, Too Am American (1995—unpublished) Discussions with American youth on diversity, prejudice, religion and race.

== Miscellaneous Facts ==
- Children's Express reporters were easily recognizable by the bright yellow T-shirts they wore on the job. CE editors also wore a "uniform"—red polo-style shirts with the Children's Express logo in one corner.
- Amy Carter, daughter of President Jimmy Carter, was a Children's Express reporter in the 70's.
