= Anna Burns =

Writer from Northern Ireland (born 1962)

Anna Burns FRSL
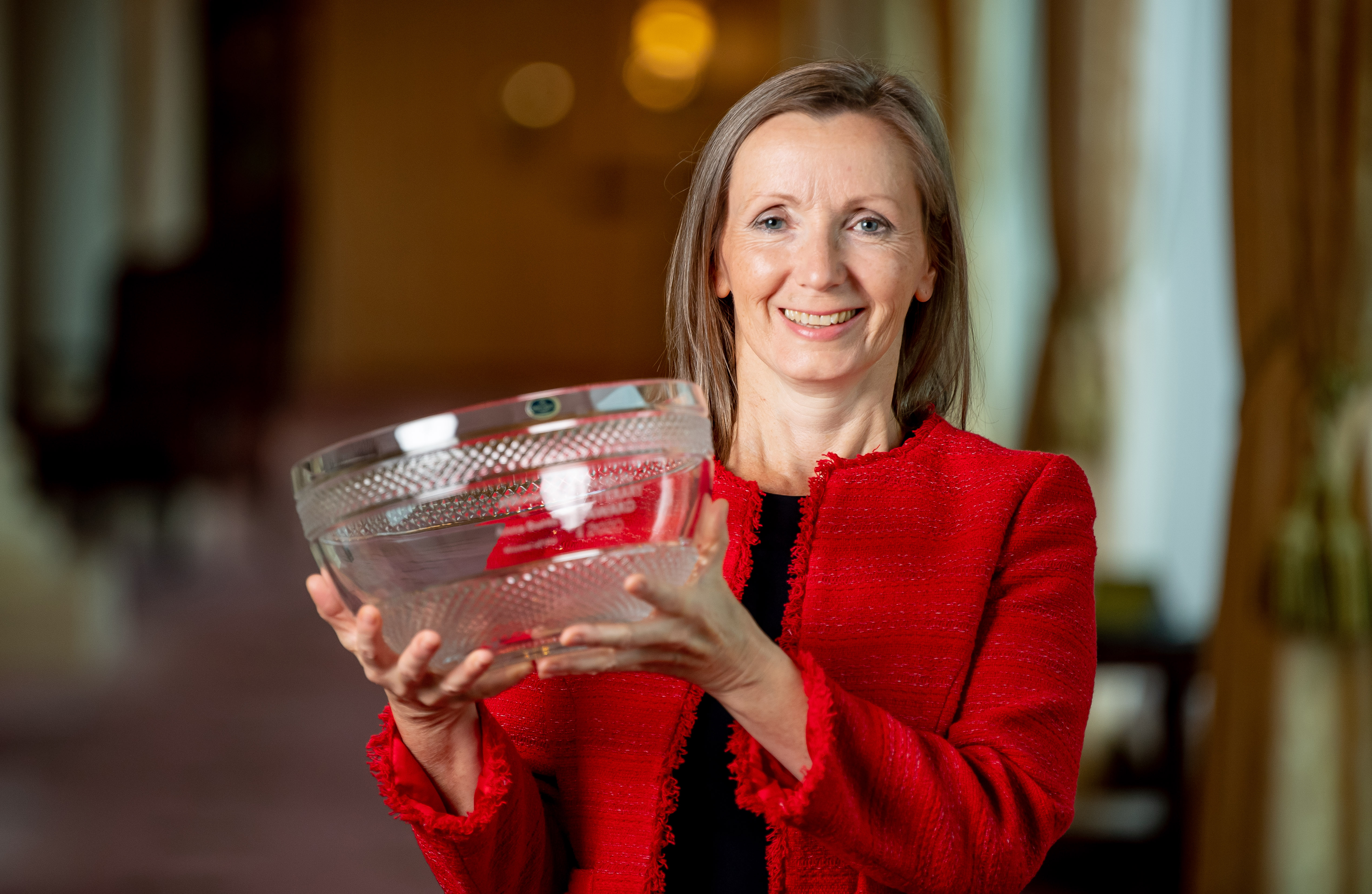
- Burns in 2020
- Born: 7 March 1962 (age 64); Belfast, Northern Ireland
- Education: St. Gemma's High School
- Occupation: Novelist
- Writing career
- Notable awards: Booker Prize; 2018; International Dublin Literary Award; 2020

Anna Burns FRSL (born 7 March 1962) is a writer from Northern Ireland. Her novel Milkman won the 2018 Booker Prize, the 2019 Orwell Prize for political fiction, and the 2020 International Dublin Literary Award.

== Biography ==
She was born in Belfast and raised in the working-class Catholic district of Ardoyne. She attended St. Gemma's High School. In 1987, she moved to London. As of 2014, she lives in East Sussex, on the south English coast.

== Work ==
Her first novel, No Bones, is an account of a girl's life growing up in Belfast during the Troubles. The dysfunctional family in the novel symbolizes the Northern Ireland political situation. No Bones won the 2001 Winifred Holtby Memorial Prize presented by the Royal Society of Literature for the best regional novel of the year in the United Kingdom and Ireland. Among the novels that depict the Troubles within the Literature of Northern Ireland, No Bones is considered an important work and has been compared to Dubliners by James Joyce for capturing the Belfast population's everyday language.

Her second novel, Little Constructions, was published in 2007 by Fourth Estate (an imprint of HarperCollins). It is a darkly comic and ironic tale centred on a woman from a tightly knit family of criminals on a mission of retribution.

In 2018, Burns won the Booker Prize for her third novel Milkman, making her the first Northern Irish writer to win the award. After the ceremony, Graywolf Press announced that it would publish Milkman in the U.S. on 11 December 2018. Milkman is set during the Troubles military conflict in the 1970s, in which the narrator is an unnamed 18-year-old girl known as "middle sister" who is stalked by an older paramilitary figure, Milkman.

In 2021, she was elected a Fellow of the Royal Society of Literature (FRSL).

== Bibliography ==
=== Novels ===
- No Bones (2001)
- Little Constructions (2007)
- Milkman (2018)

=== Novellas ===
- Mostly Hero (2014)

== Awards ==
- 2001 Winifred Holtby Memorial Prize, Winner (No Bones)
- 2002 Orange Prize, Shortlisted (No Bones)
- 2018 National Book Critics Circle Award for Fiction, Winner (Milkman)
- 2018 Booker Prize, Winner (Milkman)
- 2019 Women's Prize for Fiction, shortlisted
- 2019 Orwell Prize, winner (Milkman)
- 2020 Christopher Ewart-Biggs Memorial Prize 2018/2019, for Milkman
- 2020 International Dublin Literary Award, for Milkman
