= The Flamethrowers (Kushner novel) =

2013 novel by Rachel Kushner

- First edition hardcover
- Author: Rachel Kushner
- Language: English
- Genre: Novel
- Publisher: Scribner
- Publication date: April 2, 2013
- Publication place: United States
- Media type: Print (hardback)
- Pages: 400 pp (first edition, hardback)
- ISBN: 1-439-14200-9 (first edition, hardback)
- OCLC: 800031609
- Dewey Decimal: 813.6
- LC Class: PS3611.U7386F57 2013
- Preceded by: Telex from Cuba
- Followed by: The Strange Case of Rachel K

The Flamethrowers is a 2013 novel by American author Rachel Kushner, released on April 2, 2013 by Scribner.

The Flamethrowers follows a female artist in the 1970s. While writing the book, Kushner drew on personal experiences during and after college, as well as her interests in "motorcycles, art, revolution and radical politics." The book was selected as one of the "10 Best Books of 2013" by the editors of the New York Times Book Review. It was the subject of a literary spat between the coasts summarized in The New Republic, with the Los Angeles Review of Books attacking the New York Review of Books's review as sexist and unfair.

== Plot ==
In 1975, a young art school graduate from Reno moves to New York City hoping to become a successful artist. She meets an older, more established artist, Sandro Valera, the heir of Moto Valera, an Italian tire and motorcycle company. He and his friends nickname her Reno. In 1976, with the reluctant approval of Sandro, she takes one of the Moto Valera prototype motorcycles to the Bonneville Salt Flats where she intends to race and then photograph her tracks as part of an art project. Reno crashes the bike but is adopted by the Moto Valera crew who help her set a record to become the woman with the fastest racing record in the world.

The following year the Valera crew ask Reno to join them on a promotional tour in Italy. Sandro reluctantly decides to accompany Reno and the two spend two weeks with Sandro's family in their villa in Lake Como before the promotional tour is due to begin. However plans for the tour are put on hold when the star of the promotional tour, a professional racer, is kidnapped. Reno also finds Sandro kissing his cousin, Talia, and runs away to Rome with the Valera family mechanic, Gianni, who introduces her to a group of young radicals. Reno is swept up in part of the Movement of 1977 and participates in riots. She later helps Gianni illegally cross the border into France.

Back in New York Reno moves out of Sandro's apartment and concentrates on her art. She learns that Sandro's older brother has been kidnapped by revolutionaries and tries to contact him but realizes he is already seeing someone new. After his brother's murder Sandro finally returns to Italy to attempt to come to terms with his place in his family, and his family’s place in Italy’s history.

== Cultural references ==
Reno mentions watching Wanda, directed by Barbara Loden, as well as Jeanne Dielman, 23 quai du Commerce, 1080 Bruxelles, directed by Chantal Akerman.

Reno also makes several references to Spiral Jetty, a sculpture created by Robert Smithson.

The Motherfuckers and the Red Brigades feature in the narrative.

== Reception ==
Critical reception for The Flamethrowers has been mostly positive.

The New Yorker's James Wood praised the book as "scintillatingly alive" and commented that it "[succeeded] because it is so full of vibrantly different stories and histories, all of them particular, all of them brilliantly alive." The Guardian commented upon the book and its polarized reviews, remarking that while some reviewers such as Wood and novelist Jonathan Franzen have been vocal in their praise, other reviewers such as Adam Kirsch commented that the book was "macho," which explained "why it has been received so enthusiastically by the critics." However, Kirsch's overall review also contained praise: he wrote that Kushner had "a real gift for grasping the prose-poetry of ideologies." In a starred review, Kirkus Reviews said, "Kushner writes well and plunges us deeply into the disparate worlds of the New York City art scene, European political radicalism and the exhilarating rush of motorcycles."

The New York Review of Books published a predominantly negative review by Frederick Seidel, which criticized elements of the book as unconvincing. The review remarked that the book was "tiresome, histrionic, hysterically overwritten" and was "desperate to show how brilliant it is". The review provoked a response from the Huffington Post's Nicholas Miriello, who published it through the Los Angeles Review of Books. Miriello remarked that Seidel's review was more interested in Seidel than the book itself and that it was "gallingly condescending" and "often inadequate." The New Republic in turn commented upon Miriello's response, suggesting that Seidel's opinions might have been more based upon differences in cultures between New York and the west coast.

The Flamethrowers was a finalist for the 2013 National Book Award. The Flamethrowers was listed as one of the top 10 books of 2013 by the New York Times. It was ranked 56th on The New York Times' 100 Best Books of the 21st Century in 2024.

== Film adaptation ==
A 2014 article by The Guardian reported that Jane Campion was on the verge of closing a deal with producer Scott Rudin to shoot a film adaptation of The Flamethrowers.
