= Sabrina (comics) =

Graphic novel by Nick Drnaso

- Cover of Sabrina, art by Nick Drnaso
- Date: May 2018
- Page count: 204 pages
- Publisher: Drawn & Quarterly

Creative team
- Writer: Nick Drnaso
- Artist: Nick Drnaso
- ISBN: 978-1-77046-316-5

Sabrina is a graphic novel by Nick Drnaso that was first published by Drawn & Quarterly in May 2018. In the story, the murder of a woman named Sabrina spawns various conspiracy theories, and the book examines the impact these false narratives have on the lives of the victim's friends and family.

Drnaso first came up with the idea for Sabrina in late 2014, though the graphic novel was not finished until the end of 2017. He found the project very difficult to work on and initially canceled it after being unsatisfied with the first draft. Sabrina received critical acclaim and is the first graphic novel to be longlisted for the Booker Prize.

== Plot summary ==
A woman named Sabrina goes missing in Chicago, leaving behind her sister Sandra and her boyfriend Teddy. A month later, a grieving Teddy goes to stay with his childhood friend Calvin, an Air Force airman living in an isolated military base in Colorado. The recently divorced Calvin looks after Teddy, who is depressed and spends most of his time lying in bed in his underwear. A few days in, a video of Sabrina's brutal death surfaces, having been sent by her killer to various news agencies. The murderer is identified as Timmy, and the police find both his and Sabrina's bodies in Timmy's house. The video spreads rapidly across the internet and becomes the focus of the 24-hour news cycle. Conspiracy theories surrounding Sabrina's murder emerge, with accusations that it is a false flag operation and that Teddy, Calvin, and Sandra are crisis actors. As they try to cope with the aftermath, Calvin and Sandra are harassed by members of the public searching for the "truth", while Teddy finds himself obsessively listening to a conspiracy radio show even though it makes him miserable. The three protagonists eventually try to move on with their lives.

== Themes and development ==
Although the story centers around a fictional murder, the focus of Sabrina is not on the crime itself but on the effects of the conspiracy theories that arise from it. The book serves as a commentary on the modern-day climate of "fake news".

Drnaso first had the idea for the story in late 2014. The character of Calvin, an airman based in Colorado, was inspired by a friend of his. For research, he visited his friend in Colorado Springs and toured the Peterson Air Force Base. Drnaso began illustrating Sabrina at the start of 2015 and the first draft was completed by mid-2017. The final version was not finished until the end of the year.

Drnaso struggled to complete the graphic novel, as its themes reflected anxieties he was dealing with in his own life at the time. He was also concerned that the narrative surrounding the fictional murder was exploitative of people's grief. Drnaso initially dropped the project as he was "so ashamed" with the way the first draft turned out. He returned to it about a month later and made some changes to the book. He has since noted that the final version may not be significantly different from the original draft, explaining: "Maybe it was more of a mind-set where the change of heart kind of was more internal than anything I actually did to change the book." One of the changes was to make Sandra's role more prominent in the story.

== Publication ==
The graphic novel was first published by Drawn & Quarterly in the United States and Canada in May 2018. Sales for the novel increased following the July announcement that it had been longlisted for the 2018 Booker Prize, and a third reprint was ordered by the publisher. The book was published in the UK by Granta on June 7, 2018. The overseas rights to the novel have also been picked up by Coconino Press (Italy), Ginkgo (China), Salamandra (Spain), Presque Lune (France) and Veneta (Brazil).

== Reception ==
Sabrina was very well-received by critics. GQ proclaimed it to be "[t]he first great work about our current age of disinformation, paranoia, and fake news." In his review for The Guardian, Chris Ware agreed that the novel was "a perspicacious and chilling analysis" of these contemporary issues. Ware was also unnerved by Drnaso's use of discrepancies in the narrative to "incriminat[e] the reader" by luring them to speculate over the fictional murder. NPR found the narrative to be "far more than just a character study," becoming increasingly gripping and unsettling as it progresses. Writing for The New York Times, Ed Park called the book "a shattering work of art" and praised Drnaso's art for its attention to background detail, as well as the "deceptively plain" character designs which "somehow mak[e] their awful plight all the more intimate." io9 concluded the book was "a powerful document of emotional catalog, giving a glimpse at the quietly awful imploded lives left behind by overheated sociopolitical discourse." Los Angeles Review of Books noted that the book was at times "heavy-handed" in its approach to Teddy's development, but ultimately found the story to be "surprising, relevant, and humane."

Sabrina became the first graphic novel to be longlisted for the Booker Prize. It was featured on BBC Radio 4's A Good Read in November 2020.

== Film adaptation ==
It was announced in April 2019 that Drew Goddard would write, produce, and possibly direct a Sabrina movie for RT Features and Regency Enterprises. In April 2022, it was announced that Michael Sarnoski had been hired to write and direct a film adaptation of Sabrina.
