= Rachel Kushner =

American writer (born 1968)

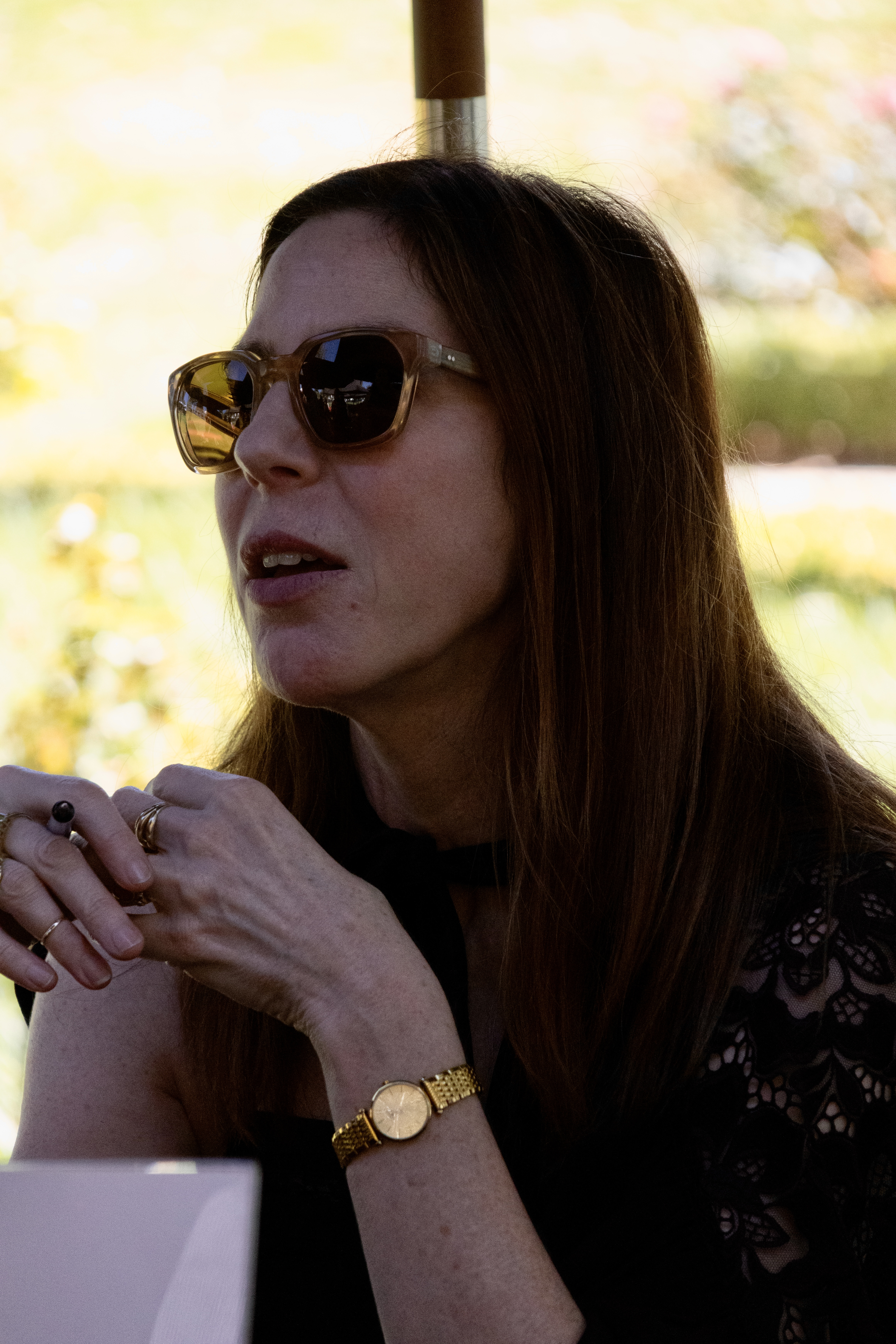
- Kushner at the 2025 Adelaide Writers' Week
- Born: October 7, 1968 (age 58); Eugene, Oregon, U.S.
- Education: University of California, Berkeley (BA); Columbia University (MFA)
- Occupations: Novelist, essayist
- Spouse: Jason Smith
- Children: 1
- Writing career
- Period: 1996–present
- Genres: Literary fiction, essays
- Subject: Contemporary art
- Notable works: Telex from Cuba (2008); The Flamethrowers (2013); The Mars Room (2018); Creation Lake (2024)
- Website: rachelkushner.com

Rachel Kushner (born October 7, 1968) is an American writer, known for her novels Telex from Cuba (2008), The Flamethrowers (2013), The Mars Room (2018), and Creation Lake (2024).

== Early life ==
Kushner was born in Eugene, Oregon, the daughter of two scientists she has called "deeply unconventional people from the beatnik generation." Her mother is part of a family of St. Louis Unitarians who lived for a time in pre-revolutionary Cuba while her father is of Jewish ancestry. Her mother arranged after-school work for her, straightening and alphabetizing books at a feminist bookstore, when she was five years old, and Kushner says "it was instilled in me that I was going to be a writer of some kind from a young age." Kushner moved with her family to San Francisco in 1979.

When she was 16, she began her bachelor's degree in political economy at the University of California, Berkeley, with an emphasis on United States foreign policy in Latin America. Kushner lived as an exchange student in Italy when she was 18; upon completing her Bachelor of Arts, she lived in San Francisco, working at nightclubs. At 26, she enrolled in the fiction program at Columbia University and earned a MFA degree in creative writing in 2000. There she studied under Jonathan Franzen, among others. She considers novelist Don DeLillo a friend, a mentor and a "tutelary figure."

== Career ==
=== Novels ===
Kushner's first novel, Telex from Cuba, was published by Scribner in July 2008. She got the idea for her novel after completing her MFA in 2000, and she made three long trips to Cuba over the six years it took her to write the book. Telex from Cuba was the cover review of the July 6, 2008 issue of The New York Times Book Review, where it was described as a "multi-layered and absorbing" novel whose "sharp observations about human nature and colonialist bias provide a deep understanding of the revolution's causes." Telex from Cuba was a finalist for the 2008 National Book Award. Kushner's editor is Nan Graham.

Kushner's second novel, The Flamethrowers, was published by Scribner in April 2013. Vanity Fair hailed it for its "blazing prose," which "ignites the 70s New York art scene and Italian underground." In The New Yorker, critic James Wood praised the book as "scintillatingly alive. It ripples with stories, anecdotes, set-piece monologues, crafty egotistical tall tales, and hapless adventures: Kushner is never not telling a story... It succeeds because it is so full of vibrantly different stories and histories, all of them particular, all of them brilliantly alive." The Flamethrowers was a finalist for the 2013 National Book Award, and it was named a top book of 2013 by New York, Time, The New Yorker, O, The Oprah Magazine, The New York Times Book Review, Los Angeles Times, San Francisco Chronicle, Vogue, The Wall Street Journal, Salon.com, Slate, The Daily Beast, Flavorwire, The Millions, The Jewish Daily Forward, and Austin American-Statesman.

Kushner's third novel, The Mars Room, was published by Scribner in May 2018. In September 2018 it was shortlisted for the Man Booker Prize.

Her 2024 novel Creation Lake was longlisted for the Booker Prize, and then shortlisted by September 2024. It was also longlisted for the National Book Award for Fiction.

=== Journalism ===
After completing her MFA, Kushner lived in New York City for eight years, where she was an editor at Grand Street and BOMB. She has written widely on contemporary art, including numerous features in Artforum.

In 2016, Kushner visited Israel, as part of a project by the "Breaking the Silence" organization, to write an article for a book on the Israeli occupation, to mark the 50th anniversary of the Six-Day War. Edited by Michael Chabon and Ayelet Waldman, the book was published as Kingdom of Olives and Ash: Writers Confront the Occupation in June 2017. During the Gaza War, she announced that she supports a boycott of Israeli cultural institutions, including publishers and literary festivals. She was an original signatory of the manifesto "Refusing Complicity in Israel's Literary Institutions".

== Personal life ==
Kushner lives in Los Angeles, California, with her husband Jason Smith and their son Remy.

== Awards and honors ==
=== Literary prizes ===
| Year | Work | Award | Category | Result | Ref |
|---|---|---|---|---|---|
| 2008 | Telex from Cuba | National Book Award | Fiction | Shortlisted | |
| 2013 | The Flamethrowers | James Tait Black Memorial Prize | Fiction | Shortlisted | |
| 2013 | The Flamethrowers | National Book Award | Fiction | Shortlisted | |
| 2014 | The Flamethrowers | Folio Prize | — | Shortlisted | |
| 2014 | The Flamethrowers | Women's Prize for Fiction | — | Longlisted | |
| 2015 | The Flamethrowers | International Dublin Literary Award | — | Longlisted | |
| 2018 | The Mars Room | Man Booker Prize | — | Shortlisted | |
| 2018 | The Mars Room | Goodreads Choice Awards | Fiction | Nominated–20th | |
| 2018 | The Mars Room | National Book Critics Circle | Fiction | Finalist | |
| 2018 | The Mars Room | Prix Médicis | Étranger | Won | |
| 2019 | The Mars Room | Andrew Carnegie Medals for Excellence | Fiction | Longlisted | |
| 2019 | The Mars Room | Commonwealth Club of California Book Awards | Fiction | Gold Medal | |
| 2024 | Creation Lake | Booker Prize | — | Shortlisted | |
| 2024 | Creation Lake | National Book Award | Fiction | Longlisted | |

=== Honors ===
- 2013: Guggenheim Fellow
- 2013: Honorary PhD from Kalamazoo College
- 2015: Telluride Film Festival (42nd Guest Director)
- 2016: Harold D Vursell Award from the American Academy of Arts and Letters

== Bibliography ==
- Telex from Cuba (2008)
- The Flamethrowers (2013)
- The Strange Case of Rachel K (2015)
- The Mars Room (2018)
- The Mayor of Leipzig (2021)
- The Hard Crowd: Essays 2000–2020 (2021)
- Creation Lake (2024)
