= Telex from Cuba =

2008 novel by Rachel Kushner

- First edition hardcover
- Author: Rachel Kushner
- Language: English
- Genre: Novel
- Publisher: Scribner
- Publication date: July 1, 2008
- Publication place: United States
- Media type: Print (Hardback)
- Pages: 322 pp (first edition, hardback)
- ISBN: 9781416561033 (first edition, hardback)
- OCLC: 175289956
- Dewey Decimal: 813.6
- LC Class: PS3611.U7386T45 2008
- Followed by: The Flamethrowers

Telex from Cuba is the 2008 debut novel by writer Rachel Kushner. The novel follows a group of anglo-expatriates living in Cuba during the Cuban Revolution and was loosely based on Kushner's mother's experience growing up in Cuba on territory occupied by the United Fruit Company.

== Plot ==
Set in Cuba during Fulgencio Batista's reign as dictator, the novel follows the intersecting lives of several families of white American expatriates, the men of whom work for the United Fruit Company. Several Americans who would have belonged to different social classes back home and never mixed, become close while living in Cuba. The CEO's son K.C. Stites, with his mother's encouragement, grows close to Everly Lederer, daughter of a man considered weak and ineffectual back home. K.C.'s best friend is from the Allain family, whom the Stites consider hillbillies and who is rumoured to have killed a man in the U.S. The Carringtons are a couple who lived in Latin America for most of their lives and have an acerbic marriage. Tip Carrington is an adulterer, and Mrs. Carrington has turned to alcohol in order to cope.

In 1958, the rebel forces start to grow stronger and gain sympathy from several of the white expats' children. K.C.'s older brother Del runs off to join the rebels and helps organize attacks against his father. After a bomb goes off in the United Fruit Company's prestigious club, the white Americans are forced to evacuate by their government.

== Characters ==
- K.C. Stites, a young boy whose father is CEO of United Fruit Company and whose older brother Del runs off to join Fidel Castro and his rebel army.
- Everly Lederer, a shy young girl with Coke-bottle glasses who thinks life in Cuba will be like the novel Treasure Island.
- Rachel K., a young woman of vague European extraction who pretends to be from France and dances a burlesque. She is close to several of the overthrown presidents.
- La Mazière, a former Nazi officer who helps supply arms to the differing warring factions in Cuba and eventually joins the rebels in the mountains, helping to train them in the art of war.

== Reception ==
A review for The New York Times called the style of the novel "sure and sharp, studded with illuminating images." The Guardian dubbed it "an epic and enjoyable look at wealth tainted by loss in expatriate Cuba." In a starred review, Kirkus Reviews called the novel "Soundly researched and gorgeously written, the creative story also serves as a history lesson. An imaginative work that brings Cuban-American history to life."

== Adaptation ==
Paramount Television and Anonymous Content are producing a series based on the novel. The adaptation is by Phyllis Nagy and she will serve as showrunner and executive producer. Rosalie Swedlin and Adam Shulman of Anonymous Content are also executive producing the series.
