= Creation Lake =

2024 novel by Rachel Kushner

- Author: Rachel Kushner
- Language: English
- Publisher: Scribner
- Publication date: 2024
- Publication place: United States
- Pages: 416
- ISBN: 9781982116521

Creation Lake is a 2024 novel by Rachel Kushner. It was shortlisted for the 2024 Booker Prize.

== Synopsis ==
"Sadie Smith," a pseudonymous freelance spy, works to undermine environmental activists. After being hired to disrupt a farming cooperative in France, she begins to suspect that her mission risks undermining her own humanity. The character of Bruno, around whom the story revolves, was inspired by Jacques Camatte, Jean-Michel Mension, Boris Porshnev, Julien Coupat and Ben Morea.

== Development history ==
Creation Lake is Kushner's fourth novel. She has cited Jean-Patrick Manchette and John le Carré as inspirations for the book, along with time spent with performance artists in the 1980s. The main character Sadie is based on the real-life events surrounding Eric McDavid's arrest and the UK undercover police officer Mark Kennedy.

=== Publication history ===
The novel was published in the United States by Scribner on September 3, 2024. It was published in the United Kingdom by Jonathan Cape.

== Reception ==
It appeared on 16 lists of the best books of the year. In a starred review, Kirkus Reviews positively described the book as being a "deft, brainy take on the espionage novel." Publishers Weekly also gave the novel a starred review, praising its themes and Kushner's integration of philosophical discussion into the narrative. NPR noted that Kushner's writing used clear language and did not lean into realism, with Kushner instead crafting a disturbing, threatening world, while The Guardian's Anthony Cummings described the book as being "hugely enjoyable," praising the characters and worldview of the novel. M. John Harrison, also writing in The Guardian, praised Kushner's characterization of Sadie, describing the character as "complex and fascinating."

Dwight Garner, writing in The New York Times, described the novel as an improvement over Kushner's previous works and noted the integration of philosophy and historical flashbacks into the story. The Atlantic noted that the book built on themes from Kushner's previous novels, singling out "failures of self-liberation" as a key theme in her work. Slate and The New Republic were similarly positive, with the former noting that the novel explored "universal" ideas and the latter praising the novel's plot.

The Wall Street Journal was more negative, criticizing the book's pacing and what the reviewer described as a lack of suspense. Brandon Taylor, writing in The London Review of Books, described the novel as being "sloppy" and Sadie's characterization as being unbelievable. The Financial Times criticized the book's reliance on email monologues for exposition.
