= Maxwell Billieon =

American author and public figure

Maxwell Billieon is an American author.

== Gallery ==
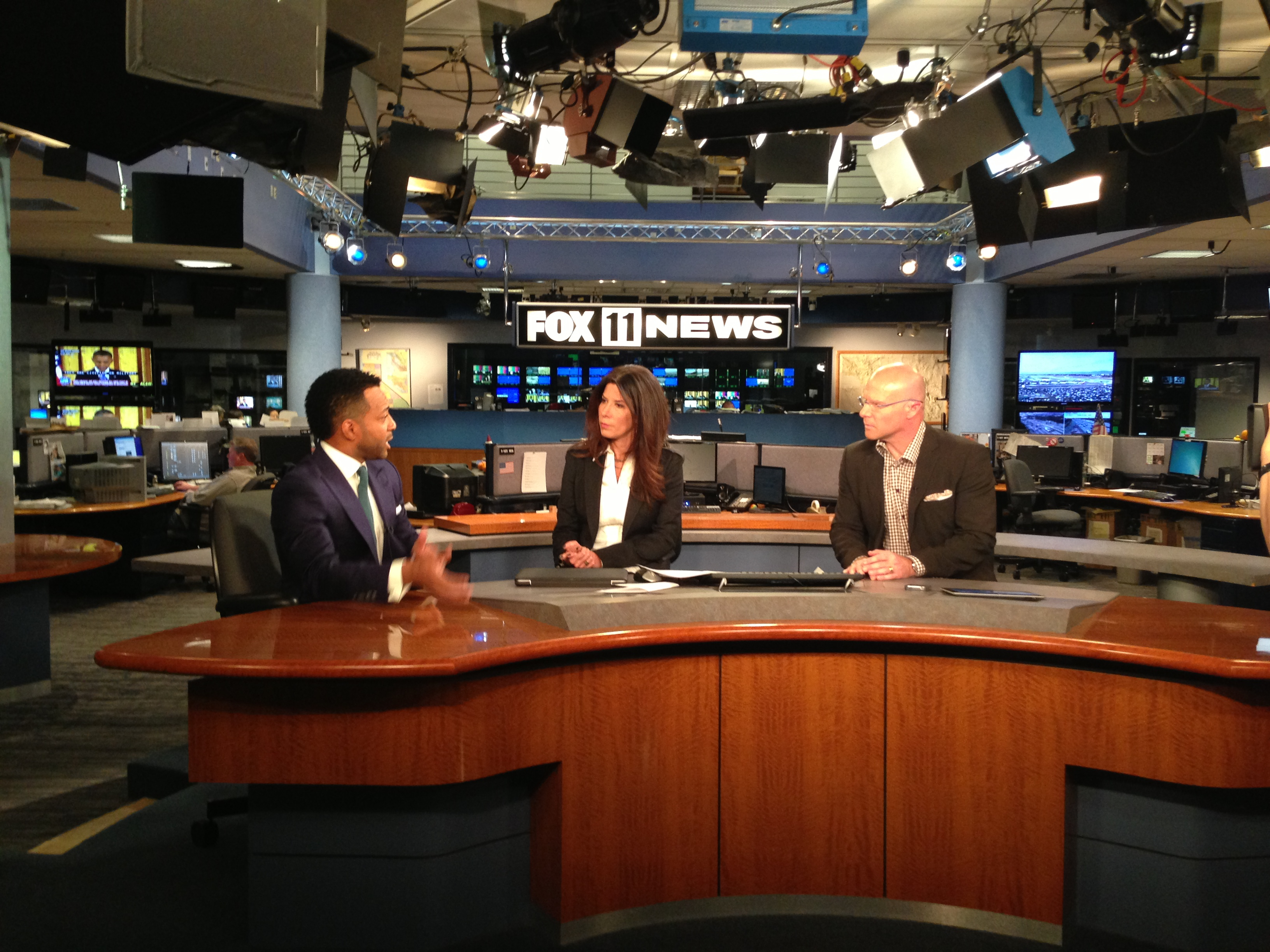
Maxwell Billieon featured on Fox News

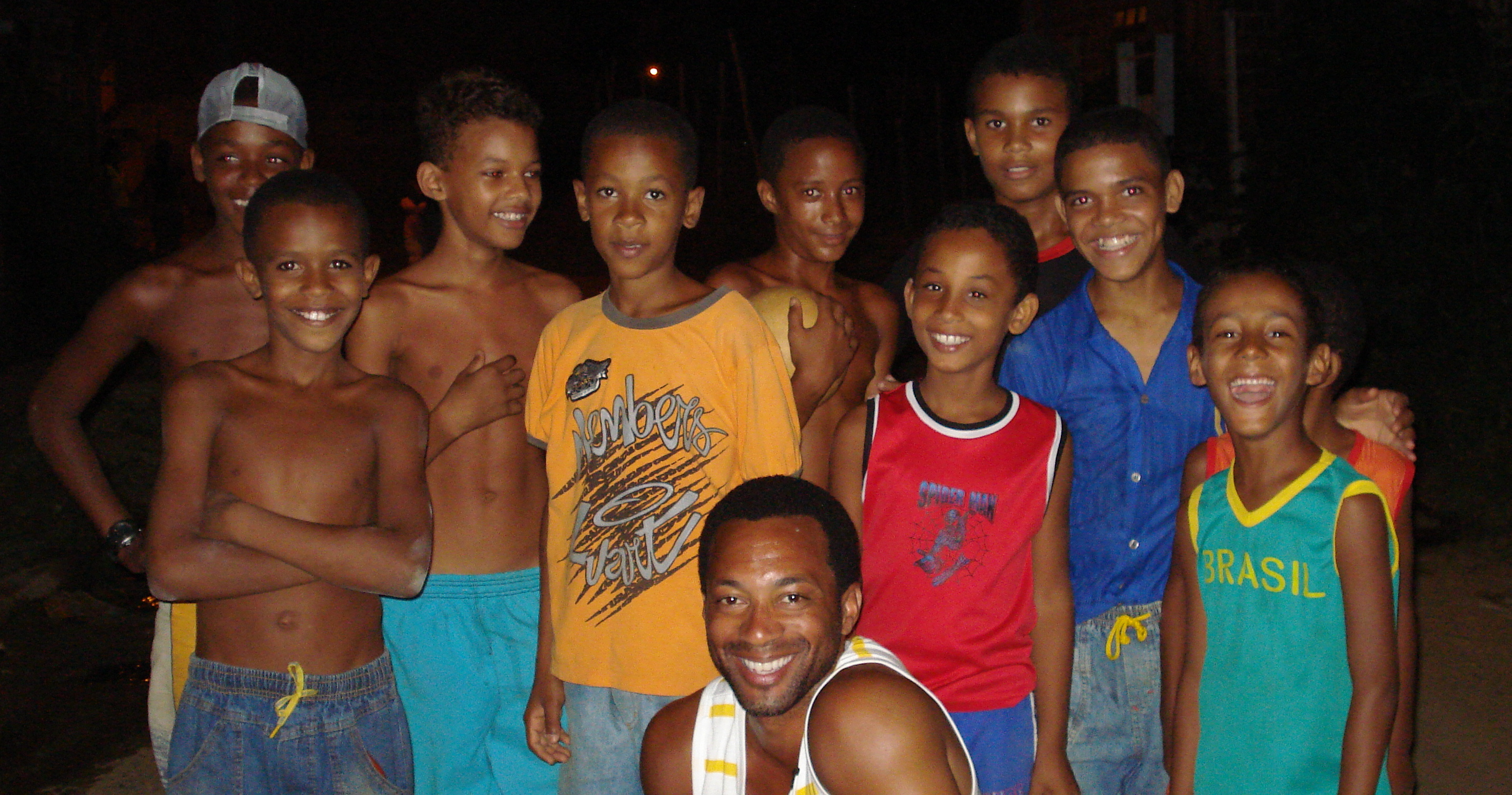
Billieon with Brazilian boys UNICEF

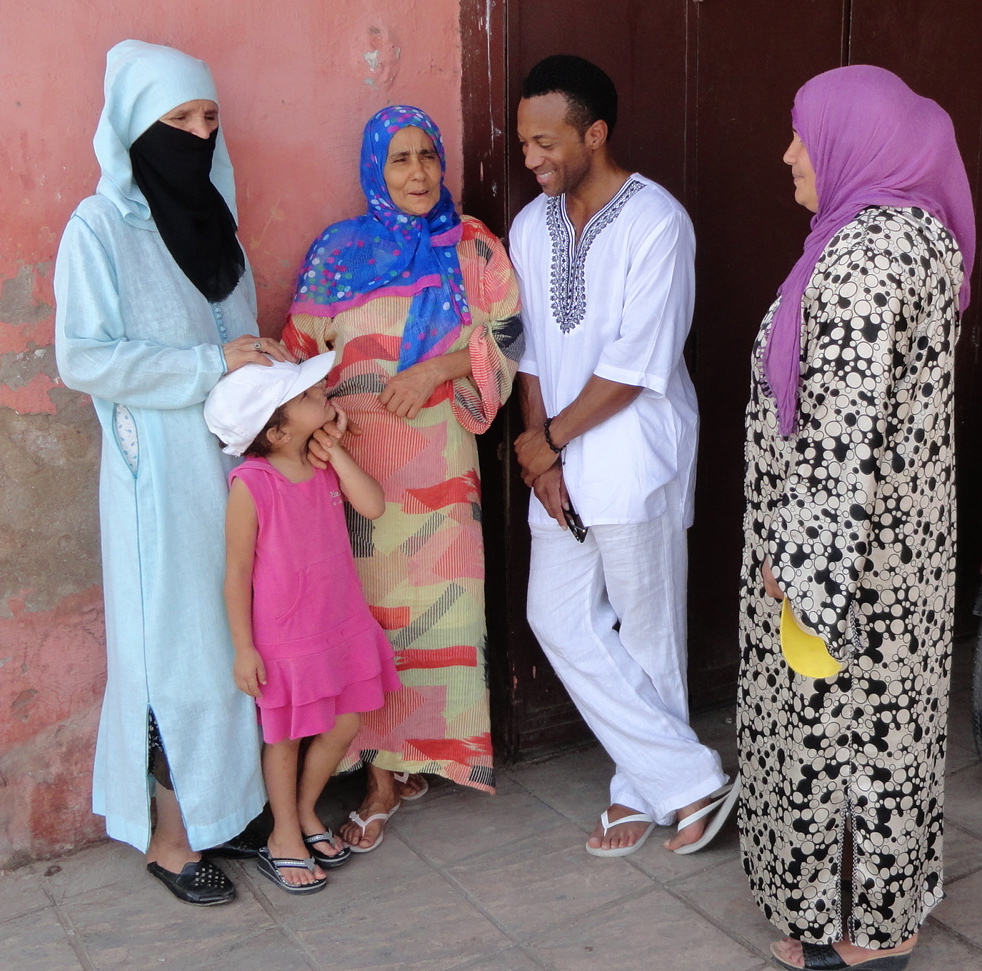
Billieon in Marrakech with Moroccan women and girl

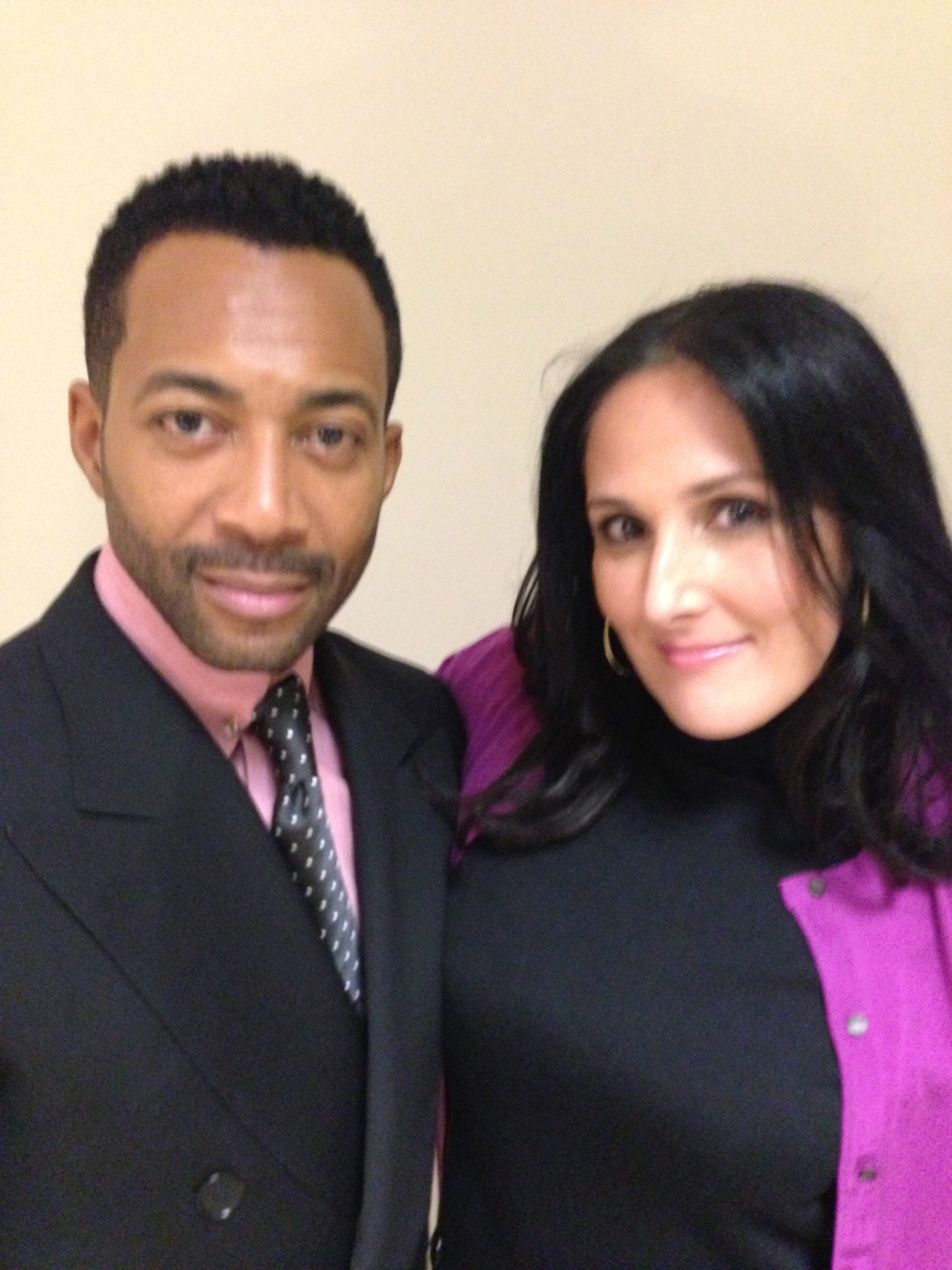
Billieon and Ricki Lake
