= Headliners (charity) =

Coordinates: 51°31′28″N 0°4′23″W

Headliners, officially registered as Headliners (UK), is a North East England-based charity that provides a programme of learning through journalism for young people aged 8–19. It was originally part of the international charity Children's Express. Headliners believe young people have the right to be heard and empower them to express themselves, tell their stories, and change their lives.

== History ==
Initially Headliners was founded as Children's Express in 1994, and was based on the international youth news agency Children's Express. After Children's Express ceased operations in 2001, the UK charity was relaunched as Headliners on 30 January 2007.

It was awarded a £900,000 Big Lottery Fund grant in December 2006, and a £299,000 V grant in December 2007.

Headliners used to be a national charity, with projects based in London, Belfast, Foyle (Derry, Northern Ireland), South East of England, West Midlands, and Yorkshire. In 2023 Headliners reviewed its operations and closed down its operations in London and Northern Ireland.

== Current operations ==
Headliners is now only based in Newcastle upon Tyne and works across the whole of the North East, mainly in Newcastle, Gateshead, North Tyneside, and South Tyneside.

== Work ==
Headliners have run large number of different programs working with young people aged between 12 and 25 year olds.

Headliners has had work shown on the BBC, Sky, Channel 4, ITV, as well as featured in The Guardian, The Times, The Independent and The Mirror.

In the Summer of 2007, Headliners worked with the BBC in Northern Ireland on a range of stories involving young people in the province.

Headliners worked with Choice FM as part of the Peace on the Streets campaign in London.

Headliners are running a wide range of programs such as the National Citizen Service, Voices for Change, Digital Citizen, Leadership Programmes, Care Leaders, and Grime City.

In 2017 Headliners worked young people who managed to complete over 30,000 volunteering hours.

In 2023 Headliners closed down its operations in London and Northern Ireland. As of 2023 Headliners is now North East based running vital projects with young people.

For many years Headliners used to run National Citizen Service.
