= Barbara Barrie =

American actress and author (1931–2026)

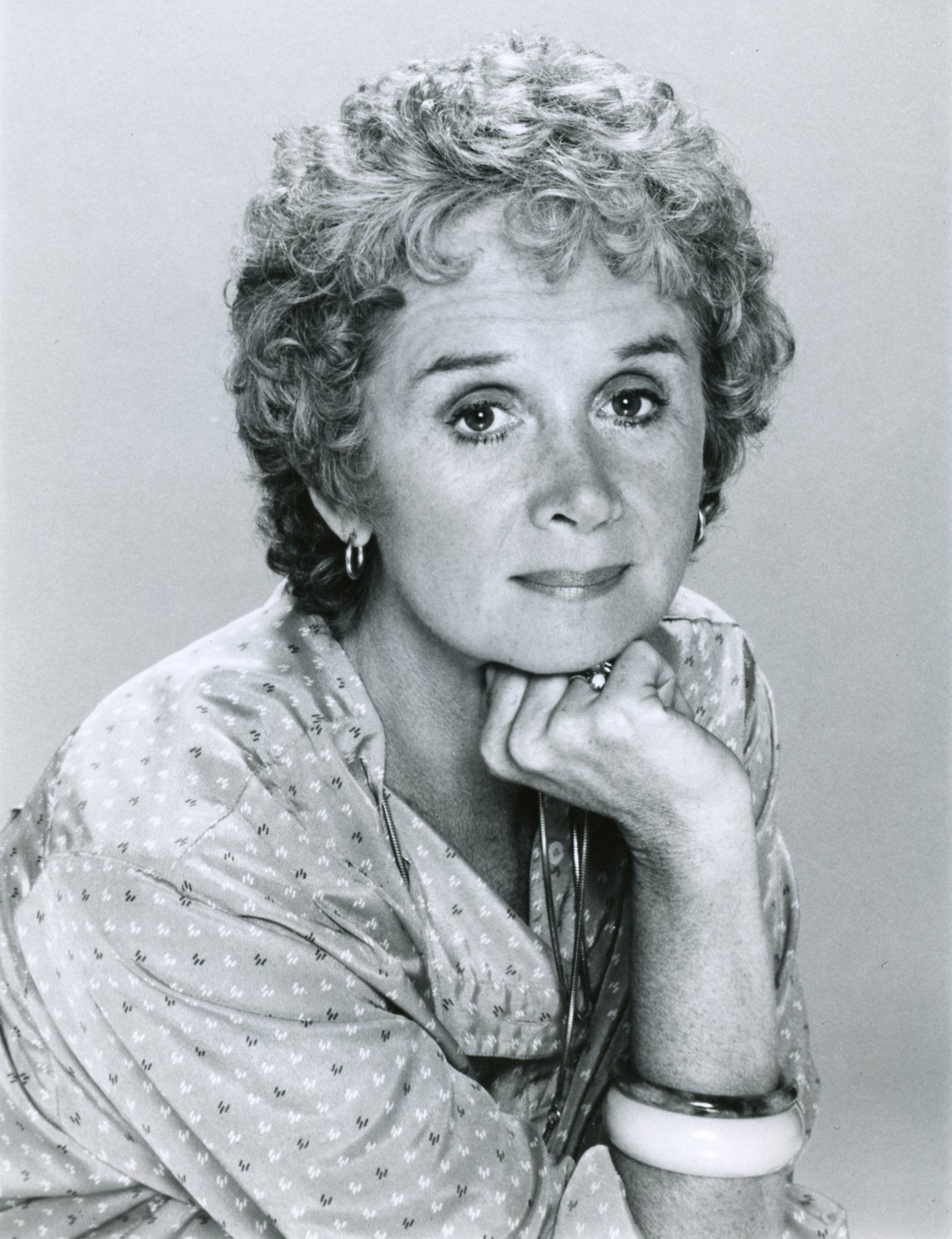
- Barrie in 1980
- Born: Barbara Ann Berman; May 23, 1931; Chicago, Illinois, U.S.
- Died: October 28, 2026 (aged 95); New York City, U.S.
- Education: University of Texas at Austin (B.F.A., 1952)
- Occupations: Actress; singer; author
- Years active: 1953–2026
- Spouse: Jay Harnick (m. 1964; died 2007)
- Children: 2

Barbara Ann Barrie (née Berman; May 23, 1931 – October 28, 2026) was an American actress and author, who was nominated for an Oscar, a Tony, and three Emmys.

Barrie's film breakthrough came in 1964 with her performance as Julie in the landmark film One Potato, Two Potato, for which she won the Best Actress Award at the Cannes Film Festival. She is best known for her role as Evelyn Stohler in Breaking Away, which brought her an Academy Award nomination for Best Supporting Actress in 1979 and an Emmy Award nomination in 1981 when she reprised the role in the television series based on the film. She also played Goldie Hawn's mother Harriet Benjamin in the hit 1980 film Private Benjamin. Barrie was nominated for an Indie Spirit Award for her performance as Sue Berlin, the mother of Edie Falco's character, in the 1999 film Judy Berlin.

On television, Barrie is perhaps best known for her portrayal of Elizabeth Miller, the wife of the namesake captain on the ABC detective sitcom Barney Miller from 1975 to 1978. She was also known for her role as Brooke Shields's grandmother Helen on the NBC sitcom Suddenly Susan from 1996 to 2000.

Barrie is also known for her extensive work in the theatre, receiving a Tony Award nomination for Best Featured Actress in a Musical in 1971 for originating the role of Sarah in Stephen Sondheim's Company.

== Early life and education ==
Barbara Ann Berman was born on May 23, 1931, in Chicago, Illinois, the daughter of Louis Berman, an insurance salesman. Her family was Jewish and they moved to Corpus Christi, Texas when she was nine-years-old. Barrie has spoken and written about the difficulties for a Jewish girl growing up in a non-Jewish community. She graduated from Corpus Christi Senior High School in 1948. She briefly attended Del Mar College as a journalism major before transferring to the University of Texas at Austin (UT-Austin), where she earned a Bachelor of Fine Arts degree in Drama in 1952. She then moved to New York City to begin her professional career.

During her time at UT-Austin, she received two drama scholarships, including the Kappa Kappa Gamma Donna Dellinger annual scholarship for Most Outstanding Junior in the Drama Department. She also received awards for specific performances, including the Atlas Award from the Globe Theatre in San Diego for "Best Female Performance for 1950–51" for her portrayal of Beatrice in the California Theatre's summer production of Much Ado About Nothing.

== Career ==
=== Theatre ===
One of Barrie's first professional stage jobs was a resident actress for one season for a theatre company in Corning, New York, where she played the lead in The Moon Is Blue in 1953. She also worked at the Rochester Arena Theatre. She made her Broadway debut in the 1955 play The Wooden Dish with Louis Calhern. In 1959, she appeared on Broadway in The Beaux' Stratagem by George Farquhar as Cherry. Some of her earliest Off-Broadway credits were in a 1958 production of The Crucible as Elizabeth Proctor and as Illse in a play version of Mädchen in Uniform directed by Walt Witcover. She was a repertory member of the American Shakespeare Theatre in Stratford, Connecticut, for the 1958 and 1959 seasons, playing numerous Shakespearean roles to critical acclaim. In 1961 she went on tour in Europe as Annie Sullivan in The Miracle Worker.

In 1969, she played Viola in Twelfth Night, directed by Joseph Papp at the Delacorte Theater. In 1970, Barrie originated the role of Sarah in Stephen Sondheim's musical Company, for which she was nominated for Best Featured Actress in a Musical.

In 1974, Barrie performed Off-Broadway as Sparky in The Killdeer by Jay Broad, for which she received an Obie Award for Distinguished Performance and a Drama Desk Award for Most Outstanding Performance. Clive Barnes's New York Times review called her "marvelous" in the role, saying that "she thieve[d] from the script every opportunity to express some reality beyond the author's carefully honed cliché". In 1976, Barrie performed in Neil Simon's successful Broadway play California Suite. Barrie played the female lead in the 1979 U.S. premiere of Botho Strauß's 1978 play Big and Little at the Phoenix Theatre in the East Village, Manhattan. In 1983 she replaced Estelle Getty in the role of Mrs. Beckoff in Torch Song Trilogy.

In 1995, Barrie performed in After-Play, written by Anne Meara, at the Manhattan Theatre Club. In 2004, Barrie was announced to play Yente in David Leveaux's Broadway revival of Fiddler on the Roof, and played the role during previews, but she departed over "creative differences" and was replaced by Nancy Opel. In 2014, Barrie performed in I Remember Mama off-Broadway, receiving an Outer Critics Circle nomination for Best Featured Actress in a Play.

Barrie appeared in the Joshua Harmon play Significant Other at the Booth Theatre on Broadway in 2017. She had previously appeared in the play's premiere in the Roundabout Theatre Company's off-Broadway production in 2015.

=== Film ===
Barrie made her film debut uncredited in Giant (1956). Her first credited role was as Edna in The Caretakers in 1963. The following year, Barrie received her first leading role in film with One Potato, Two Potato, portraying Julie Cullen Richards, a divorced woman newly remarried to an African-American man while her ex-husband demands custody rights for their child, on grounds that their child is in danger because they are living with a man of color. She won the Cannes Best Actress Award for her performance.

In 1979, Barrie received critical acclaim for her role as Evelyn Stohler, the small-town mother of a young man who dreams of becoming an Italian bicycle racer in Breaking Away. Breaking Away was nominated for the Academy Award for Best Picture and Barrie was nominated for the Academy Award for Best Supporting Actress. In 1980, she played the mother of Goldie Hawn's titular character in Private Benjamin. In the 1999 film, Judy Berlin, Barrie was nominated for an Indie Spirit Award for Best Supporting Female for her performance as Sue Berlin, the mother of Edie Falco's character.

=== Television ===
Barrie made her television debut in 1955 performing on Kraft Television Theatre. In 1956, she performed in Horton Foote's teleplay Flight as the sister of Kim Stanley's character. She guest-starred on two episodes of Decoy (1958–59). In 1962, she guest-starred on three episodes of Naked City. In 1963 she played Virginia in a teleplay version of The Dark Labyrinth by Lawrence Durrell. During the 1960s, Barrie guest-starred on many of the popular television series of the time. She appeared in three episodes of The Defenders and two episodes of Ben Casey. in 1962 she did an episode of Route 66, entitled "Even Stones Have Eyes", where she played a blind instructor, and in 1963 appeared in The Twilight Zone episode "Miniature", playing opposite the young Robert Duvall.

In 1964, Barrie appeared in two episodes of The Alfred Hitchcock Hour. The first episode was "Isabel", in which Barrie performed the title role of Isabel Smith, the murder target of her husband Howard, played by Bradford Dillman. The second, titled "Consider Her Ways," also starred Barrie as the lead character, Jane Waterleigh. In 1965 Barrie guest starred as Aimee Rennick in The Fugitive. The episode, entitled "The End Is But The Beginning" is widely considered among fans to be one of the best of the 120 episodes. In 1967 she guest-starred in the TV series The Invaders in the episode "The Enemy". In 1975 Barrie was directed by Lee Grant in the television film For The Use Of The Hall as "Charlotte". In 1977 she appeared in two television films, as the mother of Lesley Ann Warren's character in 79 Park Avenue and as Emily McPhail in Tell Me My Name. In 1978 she played Emily Armsworth in the Disney television film Child of Glass, based on the novel The Ghost Belonged to Me by Richard Peck. In 1978 she played Mrs. Berg in the television film Summer of My German Soldier.

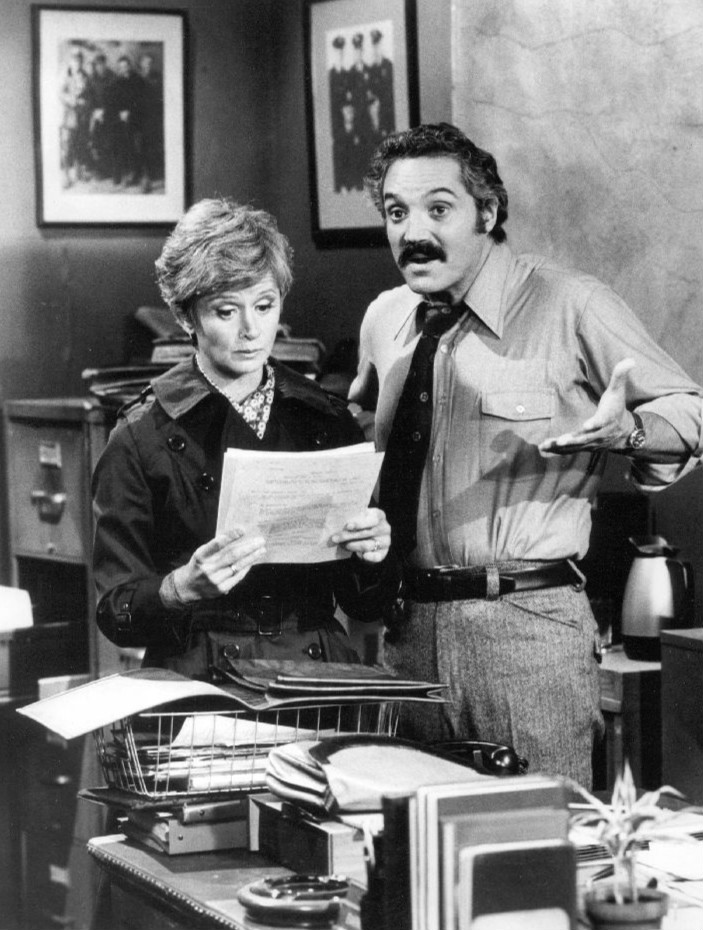
Barrie on the set of Barney Miller in 1975 with Hal Linden

From 1975 to 1978, Barrie was credited in 37 episodes of Barney Miller, starring Hal Linden, as Barney's wife Elizabeth. In the 1979 television mini-series Backstairs at the White House she portrayed Mamie Eisenhower. In the fall of 1980 a television series based on the film Breaking Away debuted on ABC with Barrie reprising her role as Evelyn Stoller. The show lasted only part of one season, but Barrie was nominated for an Emmy Award for her performance. Barrie reprised her role as Harriet Benjamin in the 1981 television series Private Benjamin, which was based on the 1980 film of the same name. Also in 1981, Barrie played Ethel Banks in a televised version of the play Barefoot in the Park by Neil Simon and appeared in the television film The Children Nobody Wanted in December of that year.

She guest-starred on a 1987 episode of Family Ties as Aunt Rosemary. For her performance as Mrs. Bream on a February 1992 episode of Law & Order ("Vengeance"), Barrie was nominated for the Emmy Award for Best Supporting Actress in a Drama. In 1994 she played the character of Pauline Robillard in the Emmy-winning mini-series Scarlett. In 1997 she voiced Alcmene, the adoptive mother of Hercules, in the Disney animated film Hercules and in 1998 she played the role of Ruth in the television film A Chance of Snow.

Barrie was credited in 92 episodes of the television series Suddenly Susan as Brooke Shields's character's grandmother, Aileen Keane. For her performance in a May 2003 episode of Law & Order: Special Victims Unit ("Perfect") as Paula Haggerty, Barrie was nominated for the Emmy Award for Best Guest Actress in a Drama. In 2004 she appeared in Dead Like Me as Georgia's grandmother / Joy's mother. Her final television credits included roles on Pushing Daisies, Nurse Jackie, and Enlightened.

=== Books ===
Barrie wrote two children's books. In 1990, she published Lone Star, a novel based on her own childhood experiences, about a girl named Jane who moves from Illinois to Texas and deals with her Orthodox Jewish family assimilating to Texas culture.

Her second book, Adam ZigZag, was published in 1994 and is also biographical, about a young boy named Adam with an actress mother who struggles with dyslexia.

She was also the author of two books about her battle with colorectal cancer: Second Act (1997) and Don't Die of Embarrassment (1999) and said that speaking out about early detection was "more important than acting" for her.

== Personal life and death ==
Barrie married director, actor, and producer Jay Malcolm Harnick (1928–2007) in July 1964. They had two children. Harnick founded Theatreworks USA and was the brother of Tony Award-winning musical lyricist Sheldon Harnick.

In 1972, Barrie signed her name (as Barbara Barrie Harnick) to the Ms. campaign "We Have Had Abortions" which called for an end to "archaic laws" limiting reproductive freedom. The campaign encouraged women to share their stories and take action.

She was treated successfully for rectal cancer in 1994. In September 2014, Barrie announced she had been diagnosed with idiopathic pulmonary fibrosis, an incurable lung disease.

Barrie died at her Manhattan home on October 28, 2026, after opting for Medical Aid in Dying (MAiD) following a terminal cancer diagnosis. She was 95.

== Filmography ==
=== Film ===
Year	Title	Role	Notes
1956	Giant	Mary Lou Decker	Uncredited
1963	The Caretakers	Edna	
1964	One Potato, Two Potato	Julie Cullen Richards	Cannes Film Festival Award for Best Actress; Nominated—New York Film Critics Circle Award for Best Actress
1978	Summer of My German Soldier	Mrs. Bergen	
1979	The Bell Jar	Jay Cee	
1979	Breaking Away	Evelyn Stohler	Nominated—Academy Award for Best Supporting Actress; Nominated—National Society of Film Critics Award for Best Supporting Actress; Nominated—New York Film Critics Circle Award for Best Supporting Actress
1980	Private Benjamin	Harriet Benjamin	
1987	End of the Line	Jean Haney	
1987	Real Men	Mom Pirandello	
1997	Hercules	Alcmene	Voice
1999	Judy Berlin	Sue Berlin	Nominated—Independent Spirit Award for Best Supporting Female
1999	30 Days	Barbara Trainer	
2000	$pent	Mrs. Walsh	
2004	Second Best	Dorothea	
2009	Frame of Mind	Thelma	
2009	The Six Wives of Henry Lefay	Mae	
2010	Harvest	Yetta Monopoli	
2010	Twelve Thirty	Eve	
2018	Above All Things	Maggie	
2024	The Magnificent Meyersons	Celeste	
2025	Things Like This	Portia	

=== Television ===
Year	Title	Role	Notes
1951	Love of Life	Ginny Crandall	Unknown episodes
1955	Pond's Theater	—N/a	Episode: "Cynara"
1955	Kraft Television Theatre	—N/a	Episode: "Lady Ruth"
1956	Playwrights '56	Verna Anderson	Episode: "Flight"
1957	Robert Montgomery Presents	Maggie Correll	Episode: "Wait for Me"
1957	Suspicion	Ethel	Episode: "Heartbeat"
1958	Decoy	Anne	Episode: "My Brother's Killer"
1960	The Play of the Week	Lila	Episode: "A Palm Tree in a Rose Garden"
1960	The Art Carney Special	—N/a	Episode: "Full Moon Over Brooklyn"
1961	The Defenders	Fran Helber	Episode: "The Attack"
1961	Armstrong Circle Theatre	Joanna Sommers	Episode: "Black Market Babies"
1961	The United States Steel Hour	Trina Trent	Episode: "Delayed Honeymoon"
1962	Route 66	Celia	Episode: "Even Stones Have Eyes"
1962	The Untouchables	Cheryl Hines	Episode: "The Chess Game"
1962	Naked City	Rosalind Faber, Sarah Hinson, Marcia Kormack	3 episodes
1963	Ben Casey	Martha Dignan	Episode: "Lullaby for Billy Dignan"
1963	Dr. Kildare	Peggy Farrow	Episode: "The Mosaic"
1963	The Virginian	Ellen Beecher	Episode: "The Small Parade"
1963	The Twilight Zone	Myra Russell	Episode: "Miniature"
1963	Alcoa Premiere	Virginia Stanley	Episode: "The Dark Labyrinth"
1964	Mr. Novak	Mary Smith	Episode: "How Does Your Garden Grow?"
1964	The Doctors and the Nurses	Laura Crane	Episode: "The Love of a Smart Operator"
1964	The Defenders	Shirley Lowell	2 episodes
1964	The Alfred Hitchcock Hour	Isabel Smith	Episode: "Isabel"
1964	The Alfred Hitchcock Hour	Dr. Jane Sumner Waterleigh	Episode: "Consider Her Ways"
1965	The Fugitive	Aimee Rennick	Episode: "The End Is But the Beginning"
1965	Ben Casey	Ellen Tevlin	Episode: "A Rambling Discourse on Egyptian Water Clocks"
1965	Rawhide	Liz Harmon	Episode: "Mrs. Harmon"
1966	The Trials of O'Brien	Jean Fields	Episode: "A Horse Called Destiny"
1966	Bob Hope Presents the Chrysler Theatre	Laurel Catlan	Episode: "The Eighth Day"
1967	Ironside	Myra Dupont	Episode: "The Leaf in the Forest"
1967	The Invaders	Gale Frazer	Episode 5: "The Enemy"
1971	Play for Today	—N/a	Episode: "The Rank and File"
1972	To Be Young, Gifted, and Black	—N/a	Television film
1973	The ABC Afternoon Playbreak	Tina Bordeaux	Episode: "The Mask of Love"
1973	Koska and His Family	Isabel Koska	Episode: "Pilot"
1973–1974	Diana	Norma Brodnick	10 episodes
1974	The Mary Tyler Moore Show	Judith Chandler	Episode: "I Love A Piano"
1975–1978	Barney Miller	Elizabeth Miller	37 credited episodes (appeared in 11)
1975	For the Use of the Hall	Charlotte	Television film
1975	Bronk	Lorna	Episode: "Terror"
1975	McMillan & Wife	Emily Church	Episode: "Aftershock"
1977	79 Park Avenue	Kaati Fludjicki	1 episode
1978	Child of Glass	Emily Armsworth	Television film
1978	Visions	—N/a	Episode: "Blackout"
1979	Backstairs at the White House	Mrs. Mamie Eisenhower	Episode: "#1.4"
1979	Roots: The Next Generations	Dodie Brattle	Episode: "#1.7"
1979	Lou Grant	Edna Raines	2 episodes
1980	To Race the Wind	Mrs. Krents	Television film
1980–1981	Breaking Away	Evelyn Stohler	8 episodes Nominated—Primetime Emmy Award for Outstanding Supporting Actress in a Drama Series
1981	Private Benjamin	Harriet Benjamin	Episode: "Bye, Bye Benjamin"
1981	The Children Nobody Wanted	Hanna	Television film
1982	Barefoot in the Park	Mrs. Banks	Television film
1982	American Playhouse	Schoolteacher	Episode: "Working"
1982	Not Just Another Affair	Martha Dawson	Television film
1982	Two of a Kind	Dottie Minor	Television film
1982–1983	Tucker's Witch	Ellen Hobbes	12 episodes
1983	Reggie	Elizabeth Potter	6 episodes
1984	All Together Now	Elly Parker	Television film
1984	Trapper John, M.D.	Dr. Kate Hanley	Episode: "All Fall to Grace"
1984–1985	Double Trouble	Aunt Margo	15 episodes
1985	The Execution	Sophie Langbein	Television film
1986	Vital Signs	Frances	Television film
1986	Kate & Allie	Anne	Episode: "Late Bloomer"
1987	Mr. President	Peggie	2 episodes
1987	Family Ties	Aunt Rosemary	Episode: "The Way We Were"
1988	Winnie	Mrs. Drake	Television film
1988	My First Love	Ruth Waxman	Television film
1988–1990	Thirtysomething	Barbara Steadman	2 episodes
1989	A Fine Romance	Aunt Grace	Episode: "A Horse is a Horse, Of Course, Of Course"
1990	His & Hers	—N/a	2 episodes
1991	Babes	Mom	Episode: "Mom"
1992	Law & Order	Mrs. Bream	Episode: "Vengeance"; Nominated—Primetime Emmy Award for Outstanding Supporting Actress in a Drama Series
1992	ABC Afterschool Special	Anne Charney	2 episodes
1993	The Odd Couple Together Again	Gloria Unger	Television film
1993	Lovejoy	Miss Lillian	Episode: "The Lost Colony"
1994	CBS Schoolbreak Special	Shirley	Episode: "My Summer As a Girl"
1994	Scarlett	Pauline Robillard	2 episodes
1994	The Commish	Ann Palmer	Episode: "A Christmas Story"
1996–2000	Suddenly Susan	Helen Keane	92 episodes
1998	Hercules	Alcmene	Voice, episode: "Hercules and the Parents' Weekend"
1998	A Chance of Snow	Ruth Pulmer	Television film
2000	Once and Again	Peg Sammler	Episode: "Feast or Famine"
2003	Law & Order: Special Victims Unit	Paula Haggerty	Episode: "Perfect"; Nominated—Primetime Emmy Award for Outstanding Guest Actress in a Drama Series
2004	Dead Like Me	Phyllis	2 episodes
2007	Pushing Daisies	Mamma Jacobs	Episode: "Girth"
2009	Surviving Suburbia	Val	Episode: "No Reception"
2009	Army Wives	Virginia	Episode: "As Time Goes By..."
2010	Nurse Jackie	Libby Sussman	Episode: "Silly String"
2011	Enlightened	Carol	Episode: "Consider Helen"

=== Stage ===
Year	Title	Role	Notes
1955	The Wooden Dish	Janey Stewart	Booth Theatre, Broadway
1958	The Crucible	Elizabeth Proctor	Martinique Hotel
1959	The Beaux' Stratagem	Cherry	Phoenix Theatre, Broadway
1966	Happily Never After	Joan Mills	Eugene O'Neill Theatre, Broadway
1969	Horseman, Pass By	Intellect	Fortune Theatre, Off-Broadway
1969	Twelfth Night	Viola	The Public Theater, Off-Broadway
1970	Company	Sarah	Alvin Theatre, Broadway
1971	The Prisoner of Second Avenue	Edna Edison (Replacement)	Eugene O'Neill Theatre, Broadway
1972	The Selling of the President	Grace Mason	Shubert Theatre, Broadway
1974	The Killdeer	Sparky	The Public Theater, Off-Broadway
1976	California Suite	Beth Hollender/Millie Michaels	Eugene O'Neill Theatre, Broadway
1983	Torch Song Trilogy	Mrs. Beckoff (Replacement)	Little Theatre, Broadway
1995	After-Play	Renee Shredman	Manhattan Theater Club, Off-Broadway
2004	Fiddler on the Roof	Yente (Replacement)	Minskoff Theatre, Broadway
2014	I Remember Mama	Katrin	Transport Group, Off-Broadway
2017	Significant Other	Helene Berman	Booth Theatre, Broadway

== Awards and nominations ==
Year	Award	Category	Nominated work	Result
1964	Cannes Film Festival	Best Actress	One Potato, Two Potato	Won
1964	New York Film Critics Circle Awards	Best Actress	One Potato, Two Potato	Nominated
1971	Tony Awards	Best Featured Actress in a Musical	Company	Nominated
1974	Drama Desk Awards	Outstanding Performance	The Killdeer	Won
1980	Academy Awards	Best Supporting Actress	Breaking Away	Nominated
1980	New York Film Critics Circle Awards	Best Supporting Actress	Breaking Away	Nominated
1980	National Society of Film Critics Awards	Best Supporting Actress	Breaking Away	Nominated
1981	Primetime Emmy Awards	Outstanding Supporting Actress in a Drama Series	Breaking Away	Nominated
1992	Primetime Emmy Awards	Outstanding Supporting Actress in a Drama Series	Law & Order	Nominated
2000	Film Independent Spirit Awards	Best Supporting Female	Judy Berlin	Nominated
2001	Online Film & Television Association	Best Guest Actress in a Drama Series	Once and Again	Nominated
2003	Primetime Emmy Awards	Outstanding Guest Actress in a Drama Series	Law & Order: Special Victims Unit	Nominated
2014	Outer Critics Circle Awards	Outstanding Featured Actress in a Play	I Remember Mama	Nominated
