= Black Sash (disambiguation) =

Black Sash may refer to:

- Black Sash, a non-violent white women's resistance organisation
- Black Sash, a 2003 television series written by Carlton Cuse
- Black sash, used instead of a black belt in some martial arts
