= Denise Nickerson =

American actress (1957–2019)

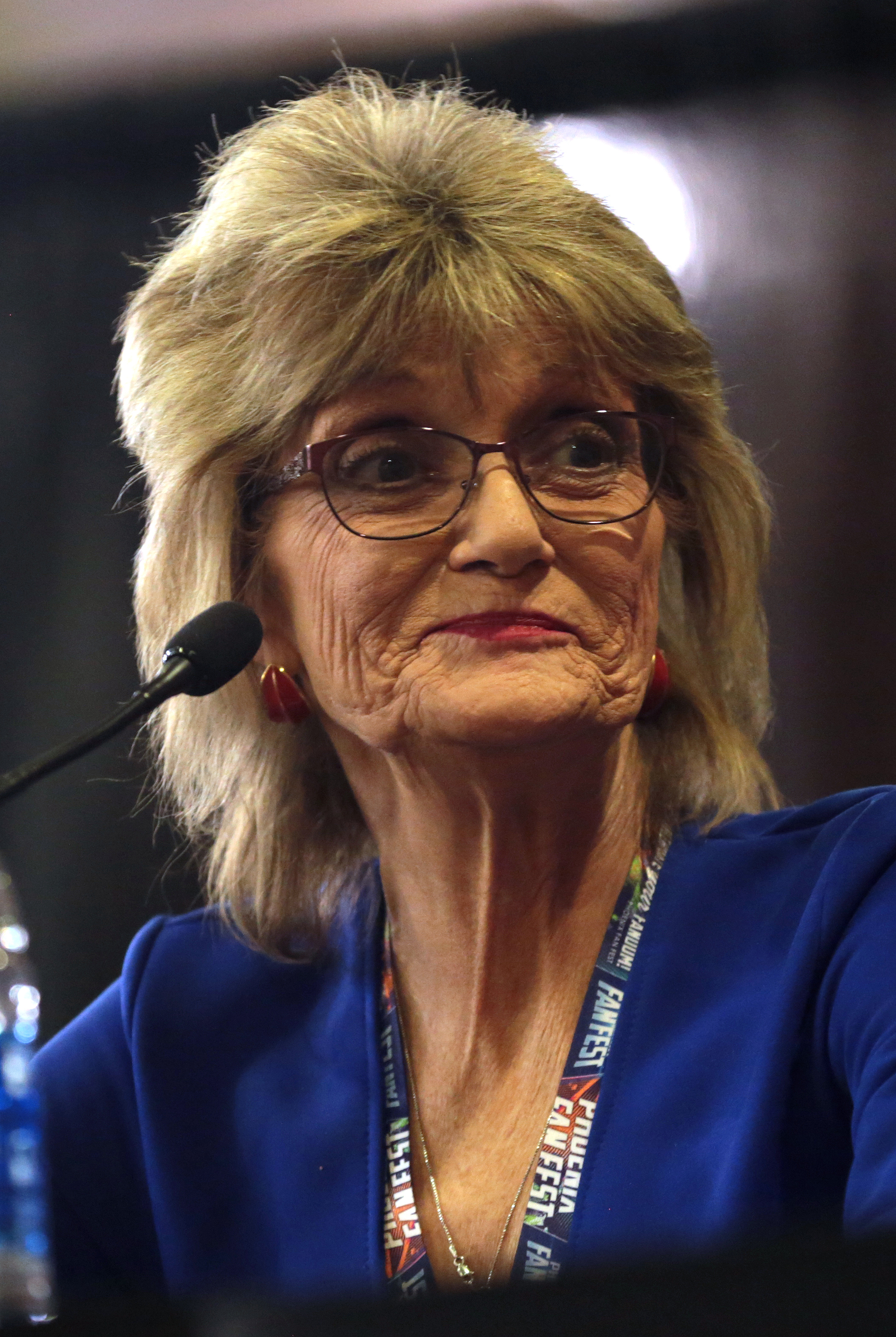
- Nickerson in 2017
- Born: Denise Marie Nickerson; April 1, 1957; New York City, U.S.
- Died: July 10, 2019 (aged 62); Aurora, Colorado, U.S.
- Occupation: Actress
- Years active: 1959–2004; 2011–2012
- Known for: Violet Beauregarde in Willy Wonka & the Chocolate Factory
- Spouses: Rich Keller (m. 1981; died 1983) Mark Willard (m. 1995; div. 1998)
- Children: 1

Denise Marie Nickerson (April 1, 1957 – July 10, 2019) was an American actress. Starting her career as a child actress, at the age of 13, she starred as Violet Beauregarde in the 1971 film Willy Wonka & the Chocolate Factory. She later played Allison on The Electric Company, and had recurring roles as Amy Jennings, Nora Collins, and Amy Collins in the soap opera Dark Shadows and numerous appearances on television and films. She later worked as a receptionist and office manager.

== Early life ==
Denise Nickerson was born on April 1, 1957, in New York City, to Florence Bickford, a clerical worker, and Fred Nickerson, a mail carrier. The family, along with older sister Carol, moved to Miami. Nickerson, at the age of two, appeared in a television commercial for a Florida heating company. At the age of four, she was discovered at a fashion show by Broadway theatre producer Zev Buffman of drama school the Neighborhood Playhouse.

== Career ==
=== Theatre ===
In 1962, when she was five, Nickerson was in a play of Peter Pan alongside Betsy Palmer at Miami's Coconut Grove Playhouse, where she played Wendy Darling's daughter, Jane. Buffman selected Nickerson to go on the road with the play, which ended its run when she was nine. Her parents moved Carol and Nickerson back to New York City at 56th and Lexington in a studio apartment, while they stayed with her grandmother in Massachusetts.

In 1971, Nickerson, at 13, was cast as Dolores Haze in the ill-fated musical Lolita, My Love during its run in Boston, replacing the original actress Annette Ferra. The musical closed on the road before reaching Broadway.

=== Film and television ===
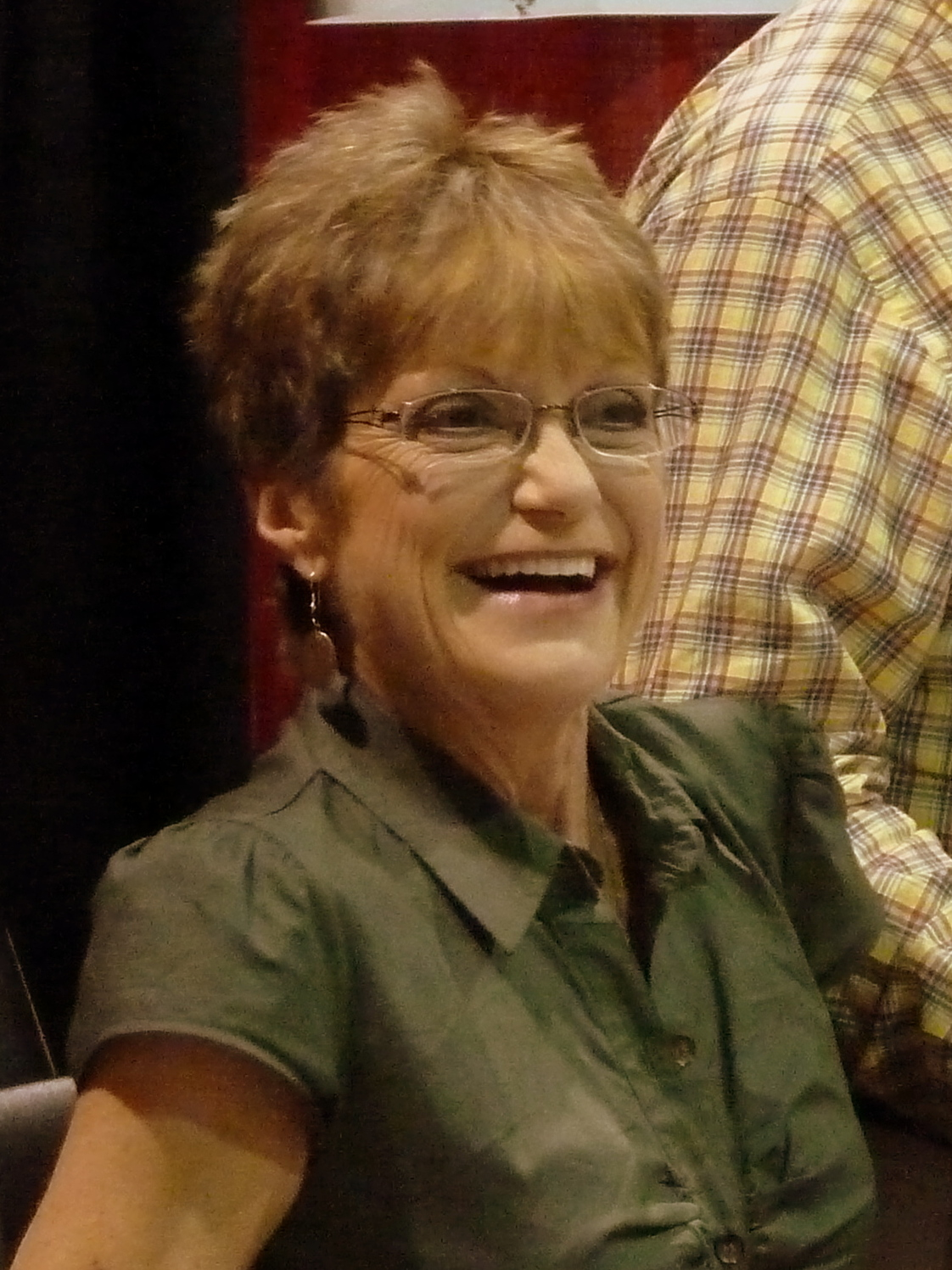
Nickerson at Wizard World Chicago in 2011

Nickerson made appearances in the 1960s on such shows as The Doctors as Kate Harris, opposite Bill Bixby in an unsold television pilot called Rome Sweet Rome, and on The New Phil Silvers Show. Nickerson's big break came in 1968, when she joined the cast of ABC Daytime's Dark Shadows, appearing as recurring characters Amy Jennings, Nora Collins, and Amy Collins from 1968 to 1970. Upon leaving Dark Shadows, she appeared in the 1971 television movie The Neon Ceiling. That year, she appeared in her signature role as gum-chewing Violet Beauregarde in Willy Wonka & the Chocolate Factory, based on Roald Dahl's novel Charlie and the Chocolate Factory.

From 1972 to 1973, Nickerson joined the cast of The Electric Company as Allison, a member of the Short Circus music group. Producers saw the potential in her fresh face and had her sing lead on several songs, including "The Sweet Sweet Sway". She guest-starred as Pamela Phillips, one of two dates Peter Brady (Christopher Knight) had on one night, in a final-season episode of The Brady Bunch titled "Two Petes in a Pod". She auditioned for the role of Regan MacNeil in The Exorcist, losing to Linda Blair. Also in 1974, Nickerson was Sophie Pennington, alongside Teddy Eccles, in the unsold television pilot If I Love You, Am I Trapped Forever?, based on M. E. Kerr's novel of the same name.

Nickerson created the role of Liza Walton on the CBS Daytime soap opera, Search for Tomorrow. She remained with the series until producers decided to age the character and make her one of the show's romantic heroines.

=== Later career ===
In 1973, Nickerson starred in the TV movie The Man Who Could Talk to Kids, opposite Peter Boyle and Scott Jacoby. In 1975 she appeared in the satiric, beauty pageant–inspired motion picture Smile, as Miss San Diego Shirley Tolstoy, also starring a young Melanie Griffith and Annette O'Toole.

In 1978, Nickerson appeared in the film Zero to Sixty opposite Darren McGavin and Sylvia Miles, and the TV film Child of Glass. She uncredited in the film hit Grease starring John Travolta and Olivia Newton-John.

=== Post-acting career ===
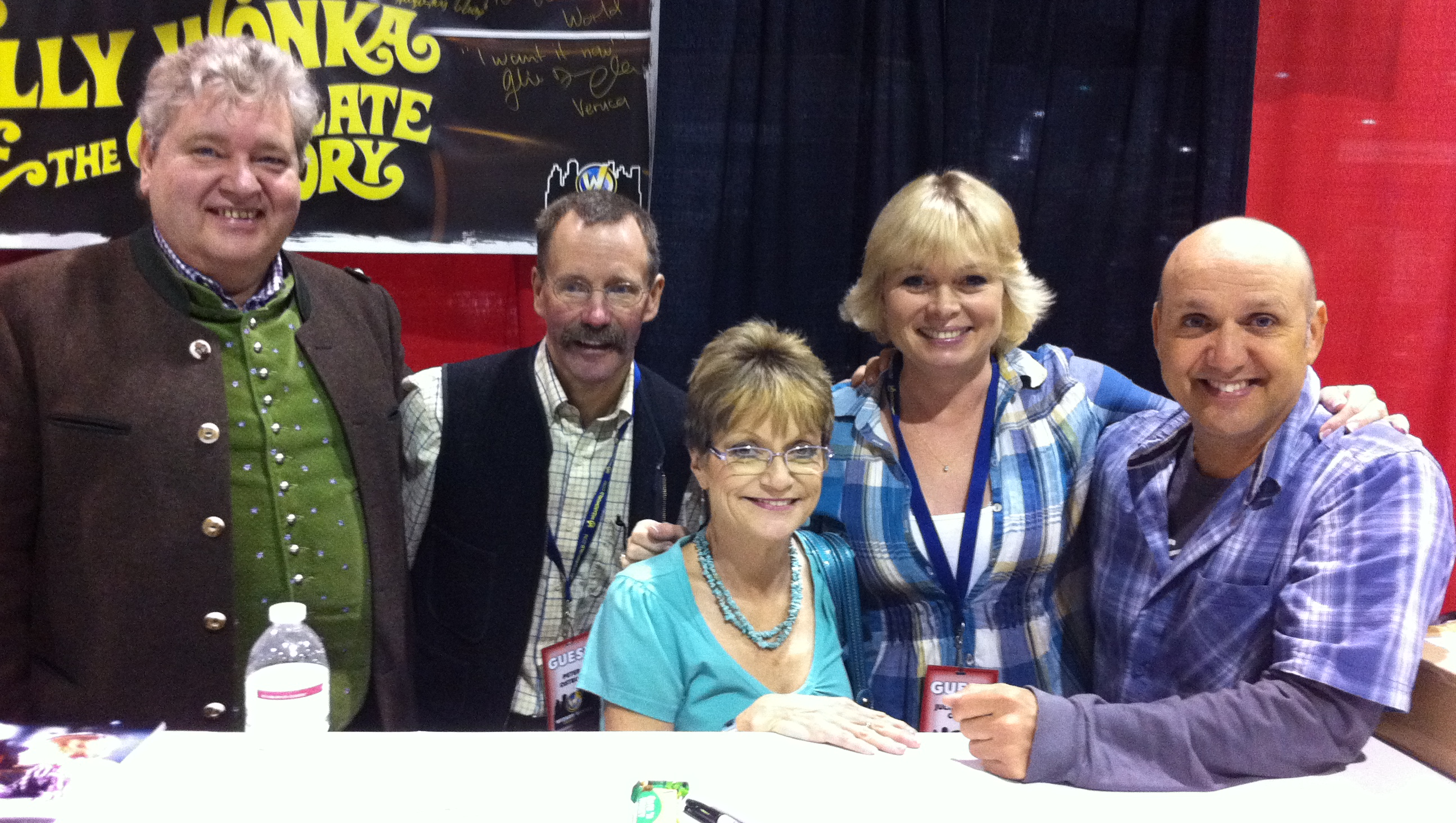
Nickerson (middle) in 2011 with the Willy Wonka child cast

Nickerson quit acting and subsequently began nursing school, but ultimately worked as a receptionist and later as an office manager/accountant in a doctor's office.

Nickerson was a longtime attendee at fan conventions for both Willy Wonka and Dark Shadows.

In 2001, Nickerson appeared in the documentary Pure Imagination: The Story of Willy Wonka and the Chocolate Factory, directed by J.M. Kenny.

In later years, Nickerson appeared on television sporadically, including an appearance on an episode of the 2000–2002 version of To Tell the Truth.

In 2003, Nickerson and some of her Willy Wonka & the Chocolate Factory castmates appeared on an episode of the British television documentary series, After They Were Famous, also directed by J.M. Kenny.

In 2011, some of the Willy Wonka & the Chocolate Factory cast members, which included Nickerson, reunited for an episode of Top Chef: Just Desserts, which challenged the contestants to create an edible world of wonder. The partial Wonka cast reunited in 2011 and again in 2015 on The Today Show.

== Personal life ==
Nickerson was married twice. Her first marriage was to Rick Keller in 1981; he died two years later of a brain aneurysm. Her second marriage was to Mark Willard in 1995; they had one son, Joshua Nickerson, before divorcing in 1998.

In 1976, Nickerson was hit by a car while crossing the street and was left in a full leg cast for eight months.

=== Health ===
In June 2018, Nickerson suffered a severe stroke and was hospitalized in intensive care. She was discharged to a rehabilitation center the following month. In August, she went home to live under her family's care. In September 2018, her Willy Wonka & the Chocolate Factory co-stars Julie Dawn Cole and Paris Themmen visited Nickerson after she was discharged from a rehabilitation center.

=== Death ===
On July 8, 2019, Nickerson took an overdose of prescription medicines while her son Joshua and daughter-in-law Jasime were out; her son took her to a hospital in respiratory distress. While in intensive care, she developed pneumonia. She suffered a massive seizure the following day and slipped into a coma. She had a do not resuscitate order in place, and on July 10, her family removed her from life support. She died later that day from pneumonia at the age of 62.

== Filmography ==
=== Film ===
Year	Title	Role	Notes	Ref.
1971	Willy Wonka & the Chocolate Factory	Violet Beauregarde	Musical fantasy family film directed by Mel Stuart; Based on Roald Dahl's novel Charlie and the Chocolate Factory	
1975	Smile	Shirley	DeLuxe Color satirical comedy-drama film directed by Michael Ritchie	
1978	Grease	‘High School Student	Comedy musical film directed by Randal Kleiser (uncredited)	
1978	Zero to Sixty	'Larry' Wilde	Comedy film directed by Don Weis	
1991	Dark Shadows: Behind the Scenes	Archival footage of Amy Jennings, Nora Collins, & Amy Collins	Direct-to-video documentary directed by Dan Curtis	
1996	Dark Shadows 30th Anniversary Tribute	Herself	Documentary	
2001	Pure Imagination: The Story of Willy Wonka and the Chocolate Factory	Herself	Documentary directed by J.M. Kenny	
2012	Celluloid Bloodbath: More Prevues from Hell	Herself	Direct-to-video documentary directed by Jim Monaco and James F. Murray Jr.	

=== Television ===
Year	Title	Role	Notes	Ref.
1963	The Doctors	Kate Harris	Pilot episode	
1964	Rome Sweet Rome	Guest	Unsold television pilot on The New Phil Silvers Show	
1965	Flipper	Tina	Episode: "Bud Minds Baby"	
1968–1970	Dark Shadows	Amy Jennings, Nora Collins (1897), & Amy Collins (1970 PT)	71 episodes	
1971	The Neon Ceiling	Paula Miller	Made-for-TV movie directed by Frank Pierson	
1971–1972	Search for Tomorrow	Liza Walton Kaslo Sentell Kendall	2 episodes	
1972	Owen Marshall: Counselor at Law	Ardis Carpenter	Episode: "Words of Summer"	
1972–1973	The Electric Company	Allison	130 episodes	
1973	The Man Who Could Talk to Kids	Dena Pingitore	Made-for-TV movie directed by Donald Wrye	
1974	The Brady Bunch	Pamela Phillips	Episode: "Two Petes in a Pod"	
1974	If I Love You, Am I Trapped Forever?	Sophie Pennington	Unsold television pilot (sitcom) directed by Gene Reynolds; Based on M. E. Kerr's novel of the same name; Screenplay by Larry Gelbart	
1976	The Dark Side of Innocence	Gabriela Hancock	Made-for-TV movie directed by Jerry Thorpe	
1976	Bert D'Angelo/Superstar	Guest	Episode: "What Kind of Cop Are You?"	
1978	The Wonderful World of Disney	Connie Sue Armsworth	Episode: "Child of Glass"; Based on Richard Peck's novel The Ghost Belonged to Me	
2003	After They Were Famous	Herself	Episode: "Willy Wonka & the Chocolate Factory"	
2011	Top Chef: Just Desserts	Herself	Episode: "Pure Imagination"	
2012	Beyond the Marquee	Herself	Episode: "Meet the Wonka Kids"	

=== Theatre ===
Title	Role	Location	Dates	Notes	Ref.
Sherry!	Ensemble	Alvin Theatre	March 28 – May 27, 1967	Based on The Man Who Came to Dinner by George S. Kaufman and Moss Hart	
Our Town	Rebecca Gibbs	Anta Playhouse	November 27 – December 27, 1969	Metatheatrical three-act play by American playwright Thornton Wilder	
