= Sarah Allen =

Canadian actress (born 1980)

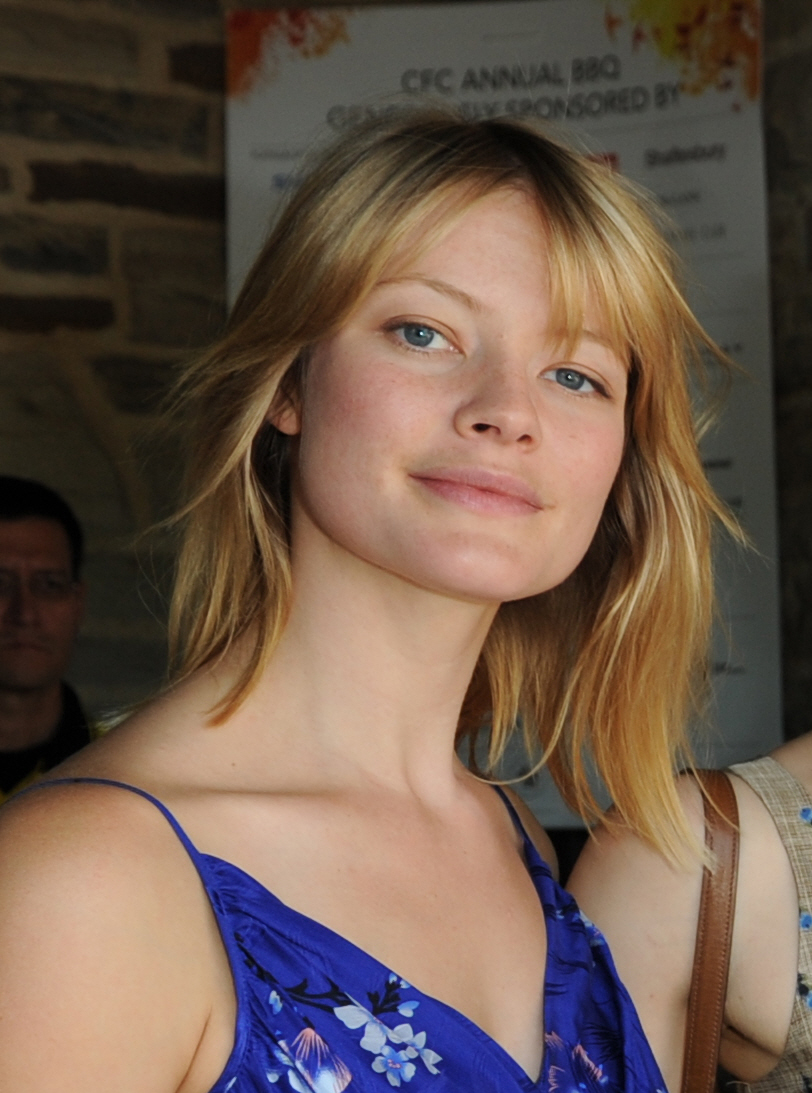
- Born: 1980 (age 45–46); Nelson, British Columbia
- Occupation: Actress
- Years active: 2003–present

Sarah Allen (born 1980) is a Canadian actress. She studied acting at the National Theatre School of Canada and graduated in 2002.

== Being Human ==
Allen is best known for playing vampire Rebecca Flynt on SyFy's Being Human. For the role, she watched some of the original BBC version of the series and also researched vampire mythology.

About her character Rebecca, Allen has said: "She definitely starts the series with a cross to bear.. you know, really angry and kind of 'guard up', but I think she makes a real effort to try to be good. She does make an effort to be good, and she wants to be, and she fails constantly, but I think that even [her] attempts in changing Bernie, the little boy, to a vampire...[were] done with good intentions...she really wanted to care for someone."

About Rebecca's relationship with Aidan, she has said: "She keeps on fumbling through her existence as a vampire. She keeps trying to get involved with Aidan's life and just keeps messing up."

She also mentioned once that having to drink fake blood on Being Human was like "drinking a tube of toothpaste".

== Filmography ==
=== Film ===
Year	Title	Role	Notes
2004	Secret Window	Sheriff's Niece	
2004	Built Like Light	Esther	Short film
2009	Stripped Naked	Cassie	Video
2010	How to Rid Your Lover of a Negative Emotion Caused by You!	Sadie	Short film
2010	St. Roz	Cathy	
2011	Oh Baby		Short film
2012	On the Road	Vicki	
2013	The Husband	Alyssa Andreas	
2013	The Golden Ticket	Melody	Short film
2015	Beeba Boys	Katya Drobot	
2017	Purl	Kat	Short film
2018	Arlo Alone		Short film
2019	Home in Time	Kate	Short film
2019	Strange But True	Holly	
2021	The Retreat	Valerie	

=== Television ===
Year	Title	Role	Notes
2003	Student Seduction	Jenna	TV film
2003	Wall of Secrets	Carrie	TV film
2003	The Reagans	Girl #2	TV film
2004	Il Duce Canadese	Colleen Kelly	Lead role
2005	Human Trafficking	Ludmilla	Recurring role
2006	Booky Makes Her Mark	Willa Thomson	TV film
2006–2007	Jozi-H	Dr. Jenny Langford	Lead role; 13 episodes
2007	The Dead Zone	Maggie Hollister	Episode: "Switch"
2007	Black Swarm	Jane Kozik	TV film
2008	Voices	Maggie	TV film
2008	MVP	Wanda Gilford	Recurring role; 6 episodes
2009	Murdoch Mysteries	Enid Jones	Recurring role; 5 episodes
2009	Warehouse 13	Emily Krueger	Episode: "Pilot"
2011	Little Mosque on the Prairie	Rose	Recurring role (9 episodes)
2011	Silent Witness	Stacey Lord	TV film
2011–2014	Being Human	Rebecca Flynt	Recurring role; 9 episodes
2012	Verdict	Kim Tollerton	TV film
2012	Do No Harm	Gillian Stewart	TV film
2012	Nikita	Anne	3 episodes
2013	Transporter: The Series	Ophelie	Episode: "Give the guy a hand"
2013	The Golden Ticket	Melody	TV film
2014	The Best Laid Plans	Rachel Bronwin	Recurring role; 6 episodes
2014–2015	19-2	Catherine Lariviere	Recurring role; 10 episodes; credit only: 2 episodes
2014–2015	Remedy	Sandy Conner	Lead role; 20 episodes
2017	The Expanse	Hilly	4 episodes
2018	Suits	Ms. Andrews	Episode: "Pecking Order"
2019	Frankie Drake Mysteries	Natasha Petrov	Episode: "A History of Violins"
2021	Bury the Past	Alice	TV film
2025	Doc	Nora Hamda	5 episodes
