= Voices (1979 film) =

- Theatrical release poster
- Directed by: Robert Markowitz
- Written by: John Herzfeld
- Produced by: Joe Wizan
- Starring: Michael Ontkean; Amy Irving; Alex Rocco
- Cinematography: Alan Metzger
- Edited by: Danford B. Greene
- Music by: Jimmy Webb
- Production company: Metro-Goldwyn-Mayer
- Distributed by: United Artists (United States/Canada); Cinema International Corporation (International)
- Release date: March 14, 1979
- Running time: 106 minutes
- Country: United States
- Language: English
- Box office: $2.6 million (US)

Voices is a 1979 American romantic drama film directed by Robert Markowitz and starring Michael Ontkean and Amy Irving. It features a score by songwriter Jimmy Webb.

== Plot ==
Rosemarie Lemon is a young deaf woman and teacher of deaf children whose dream of becoming a dancer is not supported by her mother. Drew Rothman is a truck driver working for the family business whose ambition to become a singer is ridiculed by his brother and father, who all live with the grandfather in an apartment in Hoboken, New Jersey.

Drew becomes fascinated with Rosemarie after first seeing her in a train station. After tracking her down, he soon learns about her hearing impairment, but becomes fascinated with how she navigates life with the inability to hear, especially since music is Drew’s true passion. When Rosemarie and Drew start seeing each other, their relationship is strengthened by their ambitions and the need for support that they share.

Despite initial criticism and commentary from Rosemarie's mother and Drew's father and brother, the couple manages to learn more about each other's world and become closer. In the end, they give each the love and confidence to succeed in achieving their dreams.

== Cast ==
- Michael Ontkean as Drew Rothman
- Amy Irving as Rosemarie Lemon
- Alex Rocco as Frank Rothman
- Herbert Berghof as Nathan Rothman
- Barry Miller as Raymond Rothman
- Allan Rich as Montrose Meier
- Viveca Lindfors as Mrs. Lemon
- Raymond Serra as Track Regular

== See also ==
- List of films featuring the deaf and hard of hearing
