= Child of Glass =

1978 film directed by John Erman

- VHS artwork
- Based on: The Ghost Belonged to Me by Richard Peck
- Written by: Jim Lawrence
- Directed by: John Erman
- Starring: Barbara Barrie; Biff McGuire; Anthony Zerbe; Nina Foch; Katy Kurtzman; Steve Shaw; Olivia Barash; Denise Nickerson
- Music by: George Duning
- Country of origin: United States
- Original language: English

Production
- Executive producer: Ron Miller
- Producers: Jan Williams; Tom Leetch
- Production locations: Danville, Kentucky; New Orleans
- Cinematography: William Cronjager
- Editor: Lloyd L. Richardson
- Running time: 93 minutes
- Production company: Walt Disney Productions

Original release
- Network: NBC
- Release: May 14, 1978

Child of Glass is a 1978 American made-for-television family fantasy film produced by Walt Disney Productions and based upon the novel The Ghost Belonged to Me by Richard Peck. Its plot follows a young boy who moves into a former plantation in Louisiana, and encounters the ghost of a young girl who was murdered on the property.

It originally aired on NBC as a presentation of The Wonderful World of Disney on May 14, 1978. The film was also re-aired sporadically during the early to mid-1980s, often on weekends during the afternoon. The filming locations were in Danville, Kentucky and New Orleans, Louisiana.

== Plot ==
Alexander Armsworth and his family move into an antebellum Louisiana plantation. Alexander's mother and sister become set on restoring the home to its former glory, but Alexander is unsettled by the mysterious lights he sees around the property. He also meets his new neighbor, Blossom Culp, a superstitious girl raised by her spiritualist aunt. In spite of Blossom's strange and sometimes annoying ways, she becomes a loyal friend.

One night Alexander sees the mysterious lights once more and follows them into the old barn, where he finds the ghost of a young Creole girl, Inez Dumaine, and her dog. Inez's uncle was the notorious pirate Jacques Dumaine, former owner of the plantation. In life, Inez was unable to reveal the location of her family's fortune to Jacques. In revenge he murdered her by throwing her down the well in the barn and cursed her ghost to remain on the property. In order to be free of the curse, Inez must solve a riddle and begs Alexander to help her, while warning him that if the riddle is not solved before All Saints' Eve (Halloween), she will be trapped on the plantation forever unable to reunite with her parents in the afterlife.

The riddle states:

Sleeping lies the murdered lass.
Vainly cries the child of glass.
When the two shall be as one,
the spirit's journey will be done.

When he realizes that Inez herself must be "the murdered lass," Alexander enlists Blossom and her grandmother to find the "child of glass." In a vision using Blossom's crystal ball, Alexander sees Inez alive with her mother, who makes Inez promise to look after her china doll Babette. Waking from the vision, Alexander realizes that the doll Babette must be the "child of glass."

Meanwhile, Alexander's mother fires a disgruntled handyman, Amory Timmons, who burns down the barn as revenge. Alexander witnesses the fire and Amory attempts to kill him. Alexander escapes by running into the burning barn, but falls into the old well. Roused by the barn fire, Alexander's family realize that he is missing, while Amory has escaped. As the police search for Alexander and Amory, Inez's dog leads Blossom to the well house, where she sees the unconscious Alexander on a ledge. Blossom is the only one light enough to be lowered down the well to tie a rope to Alexander. While doing so, she discovers Babette on the same ledge. Both Alexander and the doll are taken safely from the well.

Alexander and Blossom located Inez's family tomb and lay the doll on her grave, freeing her from the curse. However, Amory tracks Alexander and Blossom to the tomb and is on the verge of killing them both when Inez manifests as a terrifying, wailing ghost that scares him into fleeing. Inez thanks Alexander and Blossom for their help before going to her final rest. Before Inez departs forever, the doll rises from the grave and smashes on the floor, revealing that its head is full of diamonds—the long-lost Dumaine treasure that Inez was to protect. Inez has given Alexander the treasure to help his family restore their home.

== Cast ==
- Barbara Barrie as Emily Armsworth
- Biff McGuire as Joe Armsworth
- Anthony Zerbe as Amory Timmons
- Nina Foch as Aunt Lavinia Culp
- Katy Kurtzman as Blossom Culp
- Steve Shaw as Alexander Armsworth
- Olivia Barash as Inez Dumaine
- Denise Nickerson as Connie Sue Armsworth
- Jack Rader as Sheriff Muncey
- Irene Tedrow as Miss Merryweather
- Lilyan Chauvin as Madame Dumaine
- David Hurst as Jacques Dumaine
- Sue Ann Gilfillan as Ludee Calhoun

== Filming ==
The film was shot on location in Danville, Kentucky in August 1977. For the scene in which the exterior barn burns, the production used pyrotechnics to burn a real barn that was purchased from a local man, dismantled, and relocated to a different site where it was reassembled.

The graveyard scenes were filmed in Bellevue Cemetery in Danville, but there was no appropriate tomb for the final scene, therefore one was built in the cemetery. The set remained a popular tourist attraction for years afterwards.

== Home media ==
Billboard magazine mentioned Child of Glass under "New Releases: Home Video" in their January 31, 1987 issue.
