= Olivia Barash =

American actress

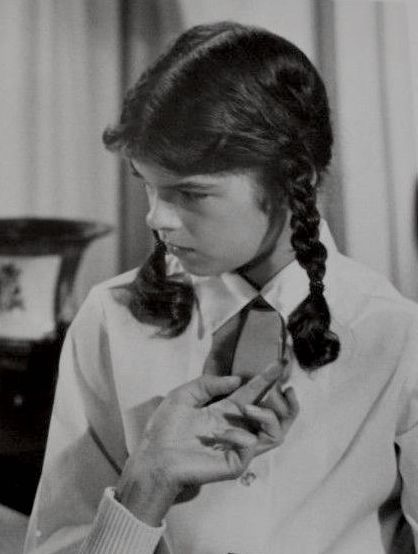
- Barash in a 1978 episode of Charlie's Angels
- Born: January 11, 1965 (age 61); Miami, Florida, U.S.
- Education: Palisades High School
- Occupations: Actress; director; producer; songwriter; singer
- Years active: 1968–present
- Known for: Fame; Gypsy; Repo Man; The Incredible Hulk; Child of Glass

Olivia Barash (born January 11, 1965) is an American actress. She began her career as a child actor, appearing in television series such as Little House on the Prairie, Charlie's Angels, and Soap. She subsequently had a lead role on the short-lived sitcom In the Beginning, which originally aired in 1978. She also had a lead role in the Walt Disney television film Child of Glass (1978). As a young adult, Barash established herself in supporting film roles in Repo Man (1984), Tuff Turf (1985), Patty Hearst (1988), and Floundering (1994).

== Biography ==
=== Early life and performances ===
Barash was born January 11, 1965, in Miami, Florida. Barash was raised in New York City, and began acting professionally at age 11. During her early years of acting, singing and dancing in classic musicals on stage in New York, she starred as "Baby June" in Gypsy with Angela Lansbury. She was the first child actress to win the New York Critic's Circle Award. Moving to Hollywood as a teen with her family, she attended Palisades High School in Pacific Palisades, California, and graduated in 1982.

Barash appeared in the pilot episode of The Incredible Hulk, aping the famous "flower girl" scene from James Whale's Frankenstein. In this version, she befriends the Hulk, but their friendship is cut short by her hunter father, who shoots the Hulk with a rifle, causing the Hulk to hurl him hundreds of feet into a nearby lake. Barash also appeared as a guest in two episodes of Mary Hartman, Mary Hartman in 1977, and in 1978, was cast in a main role on the sitcom In the Beginning, which followed a conservative Catholic priest and liberal, socially-conscious nun who run a mission in Baltimore; the series ran only five episodes on CBS, though a total of nine were filmed before the series was canceled. The same year, she starred in the Walt Disney television film Child of Glass, in which she portrayed the ghost of a young girl murdered during the Antebellum era.

=== Later career ===
In 1984, Barash appeared in Repo Man, in which she had a supporting role playing a UFO cultist. The following year, she appeared opposite Robert Downey, Jr., James Spader and Kim Richards in the teen drama Tuff Turf (1985). In 1987, Barash had a main supporting role in the television series Fame, playing Maxie Sharp. In 1988, she had a supporting role in Paul Schrader's biopic Patty Hearst.

In 1990, Oliver Stone wrote Barash into The Doors portraying a folksinger on the Sunset Strip, performing her original song, "Who's Walking Away".

Barash went on to sign to Warner Chappell Music as a songwriter/artist in 1992. Her focus shifted to recording and playing her music through the nineties and into this century.

== Filmography ==
=== Film ===
Year	Title	Role	Notes
1978	American Hot Wax	Susie	
1981	The Time Crystal	Baket	also known as Through the Magic Pyramid
1984	Repo Man	Leila	
1985	Tuff Turf	Ronnie	
1988	Patty Hearst	Fahizah	
1989	Dr. Alien	Leeanne	
1989	Grave Secrets	Darla	
1990	Night Visions	The Singer	
1994	Floundering	Ruthie	
2001	Perfect Fit	Janet	
2009	Repo Chick	Railroad Employee	
2013	Blue Dream	Rachel Purviance	
2014	Theory of a Deadman: Drown	Revivalist	Video short
2015	The Fishbone Reality: Unstuck - Part 1 of Intrinsically Intertwined	Elvis of Venice (voice)	Post-production

=== Television ===
Year	Title	Role	Notes
1968	The Secret Storm	Lupita	1 episode
1970–71	A World Apart	Louise	TV series
1977	Code R	Jan	"Suzy's Day Off"
1977	Mary Hartman, Mary Hartman	Brownie	2 episodes
1977	Soap	Molly	"1.4"
1977	The Incredible Hulk	Girl at Lake	"The Incredible Hulk"
1978	In the Beginning	Willie	Main role
1978	ABC Afterschool Special	Eugenie Legrand	"Michel's Mixed-Up Musical Bird"
1978	Child of Glass	Inez Dumaine	TV film
1978	Charlie's Angels	Sam	"Mother Angel"
1978–79	ABC Weekend Special	Charlotte Cooper	"The Contest Kid and the Big Prize", "The Contest Kid Strikes Again"
1979	Alice	Melissa Lloyd	"Tommy's First Love"
1979	The Triangle Factory Fire Scandal	Ruthie	TV film
1979	Out of the Blue	Laura Richards	Main role
1981	ABC Weekend Special	Jenny	"Zack and the Magic Factory"
1981	Little House on the Prairie	Sylvia Webb	"Sylvia: Parts 1 & 2"
1981	The Time Crystal	Baket	TV film
1983	One Day at a Time	Olivia Birvey	"A Young Man's Fancy"
1984	Night Court	Mary Elaine Montgomery	"Santa Goes Downtown"
1984	Spencer	Marsha	"Fast Times"
1987	Fame	Maxie Sharp	Main role (season 6)
1987	Ohara	Rita Riley	"Take the Money and Run"
1988	St. Elsewhere	Annette	"Down and Out on Beacon Hill"
1989	21 Jump Street	Becky	"Nemesis"

== Theatre ==
Year	Title	Role	Theatre Venue
1974	Gypsy	Baby June	Winter Garden Theatre, Broadway

== Awards and nominations ==
Year	Association	Category	Nominated work	Result
1982	Young Artist Award	Best Young Actress in a Television Series	Little House on the Prairie	Nominated
