= Summer of the Monkeys (film) =

- Home video release poster
- Directed by: Michael Anderson
- Screenplay by: Greg Taylor; Jim Strain
- Based on: Summer of the Monkeys by Wilson Rawls
- Produced by: David Doerksen
- Starring: Michael Ontkean; Leslie Hope; Wilford Brimley; Corey Sevier; Katie Stuart; Don Francks
- Cinematography: Michael Storey
- Edited by: Lenka Svab
- Music by: George Blondheim
- Production companies: Waterfront Entertainment Group Ltd. The Edge Productions Corp.WIC Entertainment
- Distributed by: BWE Distribution Inc. Kaboom! Entertainment (Canada); Buena Vista Home Entertainment (Note: Under Walt Disney Home Video imprint) (United States)
- Release date: December 18, 1998
- Running time: 101 minutes
- Countries: Canada; United States
- Language: English
- Budget: $20 million
- Box office: $24 million

Summer of the Monkeys is a 1998 family adventure-drama film directed by Michael Anderson based on the children's novel Summer of the Monkeys by Wilson Rawls. It stars Corey Sevier as Jay Berry Lee and Michael Ontkean and Leslie Hope as Jay Berry's parents. It also stars Katie Stuart, Don Francks, and Wilford Brimley.

== Plot ==
In the summer of 1910, a group of circus chimpanzees named Henri, Jacques, Antoinette and Dominique escape from a French circus due to a train wreck and end up in the Oklahoma river bottoms, where the main character, Jay Berry Lee lives with his family.

Weeks later, 14-year-old Jay Berry Lee is fighting a bully named Toby on the last day of school when Jay steals Toby’s prized pocketknife. Their teacher Miss Freeman stops the fight, returning the pocketknife to Toby. Jay later visits a man named Mr. Patterson at his horse ranch and is desperate to buy Annie - his favorite horse. Mr. Patterson promises Annie to Jay only if he pays no less than $75. When Jay returns home, he is punished from dinner for the fight. When Daisy, his crippled sister, sneaks a biscuit to him, she sees Jay's drawings of the horse. She then explains her own resentment, relating to her brother, as their parents forbid her physical activity due to her condition.

The next morning, Jay arrives at his Grandpa Sam Ferrans' general store looking for a job so he can earn enough money to buy himself a horse. On the way there, his dog Rowdy goes to explore the forbidden river bottoms. Jay hears chimps screeching in the distance and after visiting the store, he then discovers the chimps camping on the drunk Bayliss Hatcher's property. Jay tells Daisy his discovery, but she doesn't believe him. Jay returns to his grandfather's store and finds a wanted poster of the chimps, paired with a bounty of $85. Toby and two other bullies also find the poster and set out to trap them. Jay makes a trail of apples leading the chimps to the family farm, to trap them under a heavy box. The trap fails, so Jay borrows a monkey doll from Daisy for bait and places a padded bear trap. The chimps instead go to the house once more and wreak havoc while nobody is home. Daisy sets out to follow Jay to the bottoms, when Bayliss Hatcher steps in the bear trap and accidentally shoots his gun into the sky. Scared by the gunshot, Daisy falls down a steep hill. Jay hears Daisy calling for help and comes to her rescue. Their parents, seeing the chimps' mess, get into an argument with Jay and ground him from working at Sam's store for the next two weeks, unaware that Jay is actually telling the truth to them.

The next day, Jay sneaks out of the house and runs away. He heads back to the river bottoms to get revenge on the chimps. He finds a box containing a photo of a young Bayliss Hatcher and his family and runs to Bayliss' cabin to make a deal with him about the chimps and to return the box, while begging him not to shoot them. Bayliss finds out that Jay had set the bear trap and gets angry. Sam finds Jay and decides to take him to Ridgewell so he can research the chimps. Jay's parents are reluctant as Jay has been disobedient, but Sam tells Mrs. Lee about when he forbade her to go to the fair to enter her pet pig in a contest. His parents agree. Sam takes Jay to the library where Jay researches chimpanzees, learns many ways to train chimps, and meets a woman named Rose who teaches him how to speak some French words. Sam later shows Jay the house Bayliss used to live in and tells Jay that Bayliss' family left him due to his drinking. Later, when returning with Rowdy to the bottoms, Jay saves Jacques, the chimp from Toby's dangerous non-padded bear trap that would have killed the animal. Toby, in a fight with Jay, hits Rowdy with the bear trap, injuring the dog. Bayliss Hatcher suddenly appears, scares the bullies away, and heals Jay and Rowdy.

After Jay returns home, he sets up a place in the barn for the chimps and begins to build a cage for them. A storm arrives, bringing along a tornado that destroys the farm's surroundings. Afterward, Jay discovers Bayliss' cabin was destroyed, and that Bayliss has died in the wreckage of his collapsed house. Heartbroken, Jay goes with his father to get supplies for repairs. Before they go, Daisy shows her family a garden of mushrooms that have appeared. Jay later discovers that Jacques is dying and takes him home for care. The other chimps also arrive at the farm, following Jay. The owner Jobert, soon arrives at the farm and gives Jay $85 for finding and returning his chimpanzees. His parents then apologize to Jay for not believing him.

In the morning, Jay borrows Annie from the ranch and gives Daisy a horseback ride. Upon returning, Jay notices his father making a new horse stall for Annie, but Jay tells him not to, explaining that the $85 will instead pay for Daisy's life-saving operation. Daisy overhears and gives Jay a hug of deep gratitude. Jay then walks Annie back to the ranch.

== Cast ==
- Michael Ontkean as John Lee, Jay's father
- Leslie Hope as Sara Lee, Jay's mother
- Wilford Brimley as Grandpa Sam Ferrans, Jay's maternal grandfather
- Corey Sevier as Jay Berry Lee, son of John and Sara Lee, Daisy’s older brother
- Katie Stuart as Daisy Lee, daughter of John and Sara Lee and Jay's fraternal sister
- Don Francks as Bayliss Hatcher, a drunk man whose family left him. The monkeys hang around on his property.
- André Thérien as Jobert, the monkeys’ French owner and trainer
- B.J. McLellan as Toby, a bully who is trying to capture the monkeys before Jay does. He is Jay’s rival.
- Kim Schraner as Rose, a woman who Jay meets at the library who Jay learns French words from
- Melissa Lozoff as Miss Freeman, Jay’s, Daisy’s and Toby’s school teacher
- Wayne Best as Mr. Patterson, the horse ranch owner who owns Annie that Jay wants to buy her from.

== Production and release ==
The book was adapted into a film in 1997 by Edge Productions in Saskatoon, Saskatchewan, received a limited theatrical release in both Canada and the United States in 1998, and was released on home video in the United States by Walt Disney Home Video, a subsidiary of Buena Vista Home Entertainment, Inc. It takes place in rural Canada and featured Heritage Park Historical Village 0-6-0 Steam Locomotive #2024 as the Circus train. It was built by Lima Locomotive Works in 1944 and originally US Army Locomotive #4076. Shots of the park's town were also used for town scenes.

== Reception ==
Common Sense Media gave the movie 4/5 stars. It gained an 8+ rating, stating "adventurous family drama is okay for older kids."
In a negative review, Leonard Kladley of Variety.com wrote, "While the sentiments are noble, the storytelling is banal and predictable. Script by Greg Taylor and Jim Strain is cookie-cutter clean and shamelessly telegraphs its points."
