= The Lost Future =

- DVD cover
- Written by: Jonas Bauer
- Directed by: Mikael Salomon
- Starring: Sean Bean; Corey Sevier; Sam Claflin
- Theme music composer: Michael Richard Plowman; Petr Vcelicka
- Countries of origin: South Africa; Germany
- Original language: English

Production
- Producer: Moritz Polter
- Cinematography: Paul Gilpin
- Editor: Allan Lee
- Running time: 91 minutes
- Production companies: RTL Television; Syfy; Tandem Communications; Film AfrikaWorldwide
- Budget: $7,000,000

Original release
- Network: Syfy
- Release: 13 November 2010

The Lost Future is a 2010 South African-German post-apocalyptic film from Syfy, directed by Mikael Salomon and written by Jonas Bauer. The film stars Sean Bean, Corey Sevier and Sam Claflin. It was released on DVD on 27 September 2011.

== Plot ==
In a post-apocalyptic world, a group of survivors are organised as a tribe, a primitive society without technology. They live in a small village in the former Grey Rock National Park where they hunt various animals, and try to avoid the "beasts", bestial, aggressive human mutants who transmit a disease that transforms the victims into mutants. The tribal leader is Uri, whose son Savan is the best hunter of the tribe and his father's successor. Kaleb is the best tracker, and an under-appreciated hunter. Kaleb and his sister Miru are the only literate survivors in the tribe, taught by their father Jaret before he went missing. Jaret believed other survivors might exist outside the park and went searching for them. Kaleb, a dreamer, is secretly in love with Savan's woman, Dorel. When the mutants attack, the surviving members of the tribe, including Miru, run to a cave and block the entrance with heavy logs. Some of the young hunters say they should fight the mutants, but the tribal elder says they should pray, and if they die or are turned into a mutant then it is God's will. Trapped outside, Kaleb saves Dorel from a mutant, and they and Savan leave to find help to save the rest of their tribe.

A stranger, Amal, approaches the trio and invites them to his home, where he lives with his wife Neenah and their son Persk, across a river. Amal tells them that the mutants are afraid of water, which is why he and his family live on the other side of the river and are safe from the mutants in the area. He also tells them that the disease is airborne and since they have been exposed they will all turn into mutants. He reveals that he knew Jaret, and that he had discovered a yellow powder formula that cures people infected by the mutant virus as long as they have not completed the transformation and also makes them immune from the disease. Amal, Jaret and others formed a brotherhood to make the powder and distribute it to other tribes. However, Gagen, one of the brotherhood's members, killed Jaret and stole the remaining yellow powder, setting up his base in a ruined city where he doles out the remaining supply of yellow powder only to those who serve him. Amal, Savan, Kaleb and Dorel travel together downriver on Amal's boat towards Gagen's city to find the yellow powder in order to save themselves and their tribe. Amal lights a signal fire atop an old monolith to summon the other members of the brotherhood. Mutants attack the group and Amal is injured and trapped in a crevasse; the other three, believing him to be dead, continue the journey without him. However, all three are now showing signs of infection.

In the city, Kaleb and Dorel are captured by Gagen's men, but are spared due to the intervention of Gagen's daughter, Giselle. Kaleb finds his father's notes on how to prepare the yellow powder in an ancient and disused library. Giselle is persuaded by Savan to trick Gagen into revealing the hidden location of the powder and they free Kaleb and Dorel. Having taken the powder, the trio escape across a perilous rope bridge. Savan is killed by Gagen when he sacrifices himself at the bridge to delay Gagen and his men, giving Kaleb and Dorel a chance to get away. Amal, who has been rescued by fellow members of the brotherhood, finds them and they ride back to the village, where they and the other members of the brotherhood easily kill all of the mutants and distribute the powder to the tribe, including Miru, who is close to changing. Gagen, however, has followed them and tries to kill Kaleb with a crossbow bolt. He is saved by Amal diving in front of him and kills Gagen with his axe. Amal, who is only injured, returns to his family, and Miru begins teaching the tribe's children how to read and write. Kaleb sets off for the city library to finish his father's work on the yellow powder and save humanity from the mutant virus.

== Cast ==
- Sean Bean as Amal
- Sam Claflin as Kaleb
- Eleanor Tomlinson as Miru
- Corey Sevier as Savan
- Annabelle Wallis as Dorel
- Jessica Haines as Neenah
- Hannah Tointon as Giselle
- Jonathan Pienaar as Gagen
- Danny Keogh as Yisir
- Garth Breytenbach as Remi
- Bjorn Steinbach as Yomack
- Sam Schein as Persk

== Production ==
The Lost Future was filmed in and around Cape Town, South Africa.

== Release ==
The Lost Future premiered on Syfy 13 November 2010 and was released on DVD on 27 September 2011 by Entertainment One. It includes a making-of featurette and cast and crew interviews.

There was controversy over the rating of the film; it had been intended as a 12A, but due to an explicit sex scene, was rated as a 15.

== Reception ==
Scott Foy of Dread Central rated the film 2/5 stars and wrote that "this was a classier piece of cinema than the typical schlock Syfy produces", but it is too rushed, has too many characters and dangling storylines, and the action sequences can not make up for the shortcomings. Rod Lott of the Oklahoma Gazette wrote that the film "should be 'Lost' forever" and concluded, "Yeah, I hated it." The Daily Sun wrote that the acting, writing, and special effects were good, but the cast were too clean and pretty to be convincing.
