= Michael Ontkean =

Canadian actor (born 1946)

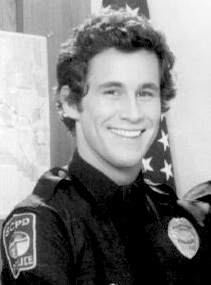
- Ontkean in The Rookies (1973)
- Born: January 24, 1946 (age 80); Vancouver, British Columbia, Canada
- Education: University of New Hampshire
- Occupation: Actor
- Years active: 1955–2011
- Spouses: Frances E. Knight (m. 1971; div. 1980) Jamie Smith-Jackson (m. 1987; div. 2019)
- Children: 2

Michael Ontkean (born January 24, 1946) is a Canadian retired actor.

Ontkean relocated to the United States to attend the University of New Hampshire on a hockey scholarship before pursuing a career in acting in the early 1970s. He initially came to prominence portraying Officer Willie Gillis on the crime drama series The Rookies from 1972 to 1974, followed by lead roles in the hockey sports comedy film Slap Shot (1977) and the romantic comedy Willie & Phil (1980). In 1982, he had a starring role opposite Harry Hamlin and Kate Jackson in the drama Making Love, in which he portrayed a married man who comes to terms with his homosexuality. In 1984, he starred opposite Kristy McNichol in Just the Way You Are. Ontkean continued to appear in films, such as Clara's Heart (1988) and Postcards from the Edge (1990) before being cast as Sheriff Harry S. Truman on David Lynch's Twin Peaks (1990–1991).

== Early life ==
Ontkean was born and raised in Vancouver, British Columbia, the son of Muriel (née Cooper), an actress, and Leonard Ontkean, a boxer and actor. He was a child actor in Vancouver. Before turning 12, he had appeared on three or four dozen Canadian TV and radio shows plus fifty-eight (58) episodes as a chorus and background singer on Cross-Canada Hit Parade (a weekly TV show which ran from 1955-59, in which the top ten most popular US and Canadian songs were performed). He appeared in one episode of the television series Hudson's Bay (1959).

His family later relocated to Toronto, where he attended Holy Rosary Catholic School and St. Michael's Choir School before attending St. Michael's College School. He grew up playing hockey and he earned a hockey scholarship to the University of New Hampshire, a Division I program playing in the ECAC. In his three years on the varsity program, Ontkean scored 63 goals and 111 points in 85 games played. He led the team in goal scoring his junior year with 30 goals, and was second behind fellow Canadian Louis Frigon his senior year.

== Career ==
Ontkean began in Hollywood with an appearance on The Partridge Family in 1971. He later had guest roles on Ironside and Longstreet, but his break was in the ABC series The Rookies (1972–1976), in which he played Officer Willie Gillis for the first two seasons. He left the show and was succeeded by actor Bruce Fairbairn. His hockey skills helped him land the role of Ned Braden in Slap Shot (1977), as he performed all of his on-ice shots himself. In 1979, he appeared in the first episode of Tales of the Unexpected. Other early movie roles include Necromancy (1972), Voices (1979), Willie & Phil (1980), The Blood of Others (1984), Kids Don't Tell (1985), The Right of the People (1986), The Allnighter and Maid to Order (both 1987), Clara's Heart (1988), and Bye Bye Blues (1989).

=== Making Love ===
Making Love (1982) was about a married man who discovers his homosexuality. Ontkean was not the director's first choice for the film: Arthur Hiller had previously approached Tom Berenger, Michael Douglas, Harrison Ford, William Hurt and Peter Strauss to play the lead, before finally approaching Ontkean. According to Hiller, the reaction of most actors was to tell him not to even consider them for the role. The film reunited Ontkean with Kate Jackson; the two had previously co-starred together in The Rookies. Many years later, Ontkean tried to prevent clips from the film from being included in The Celluloid Closet, a 1995 documentary about LGBTQ characters in film, but he was unsuccessful.

=== Twin Peaks ===
Ontkean appeared as Sheriff Harry S. Truman in David Lynch and Mark Frost's Twin Peaks (1990–1991). He filmed scenes for Twin Peaks: Fire Walk with Me but, like many others from the original TV series, his scenes were deleted from the final film.

=== After Twin Peaks ===
Ontkean subsequently appeared in many film and television productions including In Defense of a Married Man (1990), In a Child's Name (1991), Legacy of Lies (1992), Rapture and Vendetta II: The New Mafia (both 1993), Swann: A Mystery and The Stepford Husbands (both 1996), Summer of the Monkeys and A Chance of Snow (both 1998), Bear with Me (2000), and Mrs. Ashboro's Cat (2003).

Ontkean had a recurring role on Fox's short-lived series North Shore in 2004, and also appeared in the 2008 comedy TV show Sophie.

=== The Descendants and retirement ===
He had a small role in the 2011 film The Descendants, which was his last role to date before he decided to retire from acting. The movie was filmed in Hawaii, where he lives.

Ontkean was approached to reprise his role as Sheriff Truman for the 2017 revival of Twin Peaks. At first, Ontkean was reportedly excited about returning to the role, and enlisted Twin Peaks authority Brad Dukes to help him find the jacket which his character once wore on the show. Dukes located a suitable replica, bought it and sent it to Ontkean. However, in 2015, Ontkean dropped out of the Twin Peaks revival, for reasons which were never made public. Dukes recalled: "We last spoke in August and he informed me he wasn't going to Washington after all. I told him I was heartbroken to hear that. Aside from being heartbroken, I am puzzled. Twin Peaks is not Twin Peaks without Michael Ontkean as Sheriff Harry S. Truman." He was replaced by Robert Forster, playing Sheriff Truman's brother Frank. Forster was initially David Lynch's first choice to play Harry Truman in 1990.

== Personal life ==
Ontkean was first married to Frances E. Knight; the union ended in divorce. He married, secondly, to Jamie Smith-Jackson, an actress/design director and owner of Jamie Jackson Design. The couple later divorced; they have two daughters, Jenna Millman and Sadie Sapphire Ontkean. Ontkean later married Susan Sennett; they live in Kauai. He is a fan of the NHL's Vancouver Canucks.

== Filmography ==
=== Film ===
Year	Title	Role	Notes
1971	The Peace Killers	Jeff	
1972	Necromancy	Frank Brandon	
1972	Pickup on 101	Chuck	
1972	Hot Summer Week	Will	
1977	Slap Shot	Ned Braden	
1979	Voices	Drew Rothman	
1980	Willie & Phil	Willie Kaufman	
1982	Making Love	Zach	
1984	The Blood of Others	Jean	
1984	Just the Way You Are	Peter Nichols	
1987	The Allnighter	Mickey	
1987	Maid to Order	Nick McGuire	
1987	Street Justice	Curt Flynn	
1988	Clara's Heart	Bill Hart	
1989	Bye Bye Blues	Teddy Harper	
1989	Cold Front	Derek McKenzie	
1990	Postcards from the Edge	Robert Munch	
1992	Twin Peaks: Fire Walk with Me	Sheriff Harry S. Truman	Scenes deleted. Later featured in Twin Peaks: The Missing Pieces.
1996	Swann	Stephen	
1998	Summer of the Monkeys	John Lee	
1998	Nico the Unicorn	Tom Gentry	
1999	Just a Little Harmless Sex	Jeff	
2011	The Descendants	Cousin Milo	Final film role

=== Television ===
Year	Title	Role	Notes
1956	Hawkeye and the Last of the Mohicans	Cochea	Episode: "The Wild One"
1959	Hudson's Bay	Jeremy Warrant	Episode: "Pierre's Three Evils"
1970	Ironside	Man	Episode: "Noel's Gonna Fly"
1970	Dan August	Mike Foschke	Episode: "The Soldier"
1971	Disneyland	Alcide	2 episodes
1971	The Partridge Family	Lester Braddock	Episode: "Not With My Sister, You Don't!"
1971	Longstreet	David De Carie	Episode: "So, Who's Fred Hornbeck?"
1972–1974	The Rookies	Officer Willie Gillis	47 episodes
1979	Tales of the Unexpected	Tommy	Episode: "The Man from the South"
1985	Kids Don't Tell	John Ryan	Television film
1986	The Right of the People	Christopher Wells	Television film
1989	The Hitchhiker	Gordon Brooks	Episode: "Square Deal"
1990–1991	Twin Peaks	Harry S. Truman	30 episodes
1990	In Defense of a Married Man	Robert	Television film
1991	In a Child's Name	Ken Taylor	Miniseries
1992	Legacy of Lies	Zach Resnick	Television film
1993	Rapture	Jeff Lisker	Television film
1993	Whose Child Is This? The War for Baby Jessica	Jan DeBoer	Television film
1993	Bride of Violence 2	Hank Parnell	Television film
1994	Family Album	Ward Thayer	Miniseries
1999	PSI Factor: Chronicles of the Paranormal	John Doe / Wesley Addison	Episode: "John Doe"
1996	The Man Next Door	Eli Cooley	Television film
1996	The Stepford Husbands	Mick Davison	Television film
1997–2000	The Outer Limits	Dr. Field / Dr. Charles McCamber	2 episodes
1998	A Chance of Snow	Matthew Parker	Television film
2000	Green Sails	John Scott	Television film
2002	A Killing Spring	Tom Keaton	Television film
2004	Ghost Cat	Wes Merritt	Television film
2004–2005	North Shore	Gordon Matthews	4 episodes
2008	Sophie	Victor Hearst	3 episodes (final television role to date)

== Awards and nominations ==
Year	Award	Category	Production	Result
1990	Genie Award	Best Performance by an Actor in a Supporting Role	Bye Bye Blues	Nominated
1991	Soap Opera Digest Award	Outstanding Hero: Prime Time	Twin Peaks	Nominated
