= Steve Shaw (actor) =

American actor

- Born: February 19, 1965; St. Louis, Missouri, U.S.
- Died: December 5, 1990 (aged 25); Los Angeles, California, U.S.
- Occupation: Actor
- Years active: 1976–1990

Steve Shaw (February 19, 1965 – December 5, 1990) was an American actor best known for playing Eric Fairgate in the television drama series Knots Landing.

== Life and career ==
One of Shaw's earliest acting appearances was on episode 22 of the third season of Little House on the Prairie entitled "Gold Country," as Sam Delano, the son of an Italian couple mining for gold. He made another appearance on Little House on the Prairie in a Season 5 episode entitled "The Odyssey" in which he played a character named Dylan Whittaker who has been diagnosed with terminal leukemia and wishes to see the Pacific Ocean before he dies. He also appeared in two episodes of The Waltons in 1978 as George Simmons. Also in 1978, he played Alexander Armsworth in the weekly Disney TV movie Child of Glass. Shaw then appeared regularly in Knots Landing from 1979 to 1987, and thereafter made occasional return appearances until 1990.

== Death ==
Shaw died on December 5, 1990, in a head-on traffic collision with a truck in Los Angeles.

He was survived by his mother. His father had died six months previously of a heart attack.

== Filmography ==
| Year | Title | Role | Notes |
|---|---|---|---|
| 1976 | Having Babies | Mark McNamara | TV movie |
| 1977 | Raid on Entebbe | Jonathan Sager | TV movie |
| 1977 | Little House on the Prairie | Sam Delano | Episode: "Gold Country" |
| 1977 | Emergency! | Earl Robinson | Episode: "Limelight" |
| 1978 | Barnaby Jones | Stevie Sayers | Episodes: "Final Judgment" (Parts 1 & 2) |
| 1978 | The President's Mistress | Boy at Zoo | TV movie |
| 1978 | The Waltons | George Simmons | Episodes: "The Festival", "The Revelation" |
| 1978 | ABC Afterschool Specials | Early McLaren | Episode: "It's a Mile from Here to Glory" |
| 1978 | Child of Glass | Alexander Armsworth | TV movie |
| 1978 | Flying High | Phil | TV movie |
| 1978 | Three's Company | Albert | Episode: "The Crush" |
| 1979 | Centennial | Paul Garrett | Episode: "The Winds of Death" |
| 1979 | Little House on the Prairie | Dylan Whittaker | Episode: "The Odyssey" |
| 1979 | When Hell Was in Session | Jim Denton | TV movie |
| 1979 | A Shining Season | Ron Bellamy | TV movie |
| 1979–90 | Knots Landing | Eric Fairgate | 105 episodes |
