= Willie & Phil =

1980 film by Paul Mazursky

- Directed by: Paul Mazursky
- Written by: Paul Mazursky
- Produced by: Paul Mazursky
- Starring: Michael Ontkean; Margot Kidder; Ray Sharkey
- Cinematography: Sven Nykvist
- Edited by: Donn Cambern
- Music by: Claude Bolling
- Distributed by: 20th Century Fox
- Release date: August 15, 1980
- Running time: 115 minutes
- Country: United States
- Language: English
- Budget: $5,500,000
- Box office: $4,400,000

Willie & Phil is a 1980 American comedy-drama film written and directed by Paul Mazursky and starring Michael Ontkean, Margot Kidder, and Ray Sharkey. It is an American homage to Francois Truffaut's Jules et Jim (1962).

== Plot ==
The film is set in late 1970s New York City, amidst the counterculture chic of that era. Willie, a high school English teacher who plays jazz piano, and Phil, a fashion photographer, meet as they exit the Bleecker Street Cinema, where Jules et Jim has just been shown, and become friends. They both fall in love with Jeannette, a girl from Kentucky. The plot then follows the love triangle from Jules et Jim.

== Cast ==
- Michael Ontkean – Willie Kaufman
- Margot Kidder – Jeannette Sutherland
- Ray Sharkey – Phil D'Amico
- Jan Miner – Maria Kaufman
- Tom Brennan – Sal Kaufman
- Julie Bovasso – Mrs. D'Amico
- Louis Guss – Mr. D'Amico
- Kathleen Maguire – Mrs. Sutherland
- Kaki Hunter – Patti Sutherland
- Kristine DeBell – Rena
- Jerry Hall – Karen
- Laurence Fishburne – Wilson
- Natalie Wood - Herself (cameo)

== Critical responses ==
The film was reviewed by Pauline Kael in The New Yorker. "This movie is a little monument to screwed-up notions of what women are", she noted.

Roger Ebert gave the film three out of four stars. "In a subtle, understated sort of way, Mazursky is giving us a movie that hovers between a satirical revue and a series of lifestyle vignettes. The characters in his movie are almost exhausted by the end of the decade (weren't we all?)" he commented.

== Home media and rights ==
Fox Video released the film on LaserDisc in the United States on March 12, 1993. On March 20, 2019, Rupert Murdoch sold most of 21st Century Fox's film and television assets to Disney, and Willie & Phil was one of the films included in the deal.
