= Jay Kenneth Johnson =

American actor

- Born: February 24, 1977 (age 49); Springfield, Missouri, U.S.
- Education: Missouri State University
- Occupation: Actor
- Years active: 1999–present
- Known for: Performance in television
- Notable credit: Philip Kiriakis
- Television: Days of Our Lives

Jay Kenneth Johnson (born February 24, 1977) is an American actor from Springfield, Missouri. He began his career in 1999 when he was cast as Philip Kiriakis on the NBC soap opera Days of Our Lives.

== Early life ==
Johnson was born to parents Janice and Ken Johnson on February 24, 1977, in Missouri. He graduated from Kickapoo High School in 1995. He attended Missouri State University, where he majored in Business and theatre. He then moved to Los Angeles to pursue an acting career. He has two younger siblings, Jeff and Jenna.

== Career ==
He has had roles on The Young and the Restless, Days of Our Lives, and North Shore and won a role in the Aaron Spelling pilot Hotel. In addition to his regular television roles, Johnson has had guest appearances on The OC and the show Miami 7.

In 2005, Johnson was offered a role on the new ABC sitcom Hot Properties, a role he later turned down.. He guest-starred on CSI: NY and will be starring in his first feature film titled HACK!. He went on to play "JD", a trapped soul who came back to life 50 years later, on Charmed. In 2006, he was a guest star on CSI: Miami. In 2007, after a five-year absence, Johnson returned to Days of Our Lives as Philip Kiriakis. He has also had a recurring guest role on Scrubs as Dr. Matthews. In 2011, Johnson opted to exit Days of Our Lives. In 2012, he starred in the Hallmark movie Undercover Bridesmaid as Chip.

In 2019, Johnson reprised the role of Philip in the digital-only Last Blast Reunion series. In 2020, it was revealed that he would again reprise the role on Days of Our Lives.

== Filmography ==
Work in film and television
Year	Title	Role	Notes
1999	The Young and the Restless	Brendon	
1999–2002, 2007–2011, 2020–2021	Days of Our Lives	Philip Kiriakis	Regular role
2000	Miami 7	Ethan	1 episode
2003	Hotel	Ethan Cox	TV movie
2004	The O.C.	Vince	1 episode
2004–2005	North Shore	Chris Remsen	Recurring role
2005	CSI: NY	Paul Deacon	1 episode
2005	Charmed	J.D. Williams	1 episode
2006	CSI: Miami	Jason Hollings	1 episode
2006–2009	Scrubs	Dr. Matthews	Recurring role
2007	Hack!	Johnny	Lead role
2011	Melissa & Joey	Anthony	1 episode
2012	Undercover Bridesmaid	Chip	TV movie
2015	Runaway Hearts	Gabe	Lead role
2019	Wonder Pets!	Dag the Dragon	Voice role
2019–2020	Days of Our Lives: Last Blast Reunion	Philip Kiriakis	Digital series
