= Student Seduction =

2003 television film

- DVD cover
- Written by: Edithe Swensen
- Directed by: Peter Svatek
- Starring: Elizabeth Berkley; Corey Sevier; Rick Roberts; Sarah Allen; Sarah Smyth; Karen Robinson; Bronwen Mantel
- Music by: James Gelfand
- Countries of origin: Canada; United States
- Original language: English

Production
- Producer: Robin Spry
- Cinematography: Serge Ladouceur
- Editor: Denis Papillon
- Running time: 85 minutes
- Production company: CinéGroupe Image

Original release
- Network: The Movie Network (Canada); Lifetime (United States)
- Release: May 5, 2003

Student Seduction is a 2003 television film directed by Peter Svatek and starring Elizabeth Berkley, Corey Sevier and Rick Roberts. It was produced by CinéGroupe Image, a joint-venture between Canadian animation studio CinéGroupe and the Telescene Film Group, and distributed worldwide by Lions Gate Television. The film was filmed in Montréal, Québec, and premiered on Lifetime on May 5, 2003.

The film's working title was Inappropriate Behaviour.

== Plot ==
Christie Dawson (Elizabeth Berkley) is a popular high school chemistry teacher who is dedicated to her students and very passionate about her work. So when one of her students, Josh Gaines (Corey Sevier), needs help to improve his grades, she is only too happy to help. The pair have a good time, and even go out for a burger afterwards, much to the speculation of other students and some teachers.

However, things quickly turn sour when Josh makes a pass at Christie, which she turns down. Christie hopes to move past it — despite her husband's anger when she tells him about it — but Josh becomes more aggressive in his pursuit, eventually kissing her in the school swimming pool. At that point, Christie reports his advances to the principal, but is discouraged from pursuing the matter further. Principal Davis then talks to Josh, who denies any responsibility for what happened. Christie is then accused of trying to seduce him.

After meeting with the principal, Josh later breaks into Christie's home and sexually assaults her in retaliation, sending her to the hospital as a result. Once the matter is investigated, the authorities decide to charge her. This is compounded by the fact that Josh's well-off parents can afford to hire the very best lawyers, whereas Christie and her husband Drew begin to struggle financially after the school suspends her, pending the outcome of her trial.

While doing some research, Christie discovers that those who commit sexual violence are likely to have a history of doing so. She seeks the assistance of Josh's ex-girlfriend Jenna. However, Jenna is unwilling to talk, so she then turns to Josh's current girlfriend, Monica, who reveals that Josh has a history of becoming violent when his requests for sex are declined, but like Jenna, she is also unwilling to testify about their relationship.

Faced with no alternative, Christie reluctantly agrees to take a plea bargain by registering as a sex offender and agreeing never to work with children again. However, Jenna then comes forth and reveals that she had been raped by Josh, and his parents accepted her silence by paying for her admission to Dartmouth. Realizing she must do the right thing, Jenna decides to testify and pursue the rape case against Josh. As a result, Christie's name is cleared, and she is able to resume teaching.

== Cast ==
- Elizabeth Berkley - Christie Dawson
- Corey Sevier - Josh Gaines
- Rick Roberts - Drew Dawson
- Sarah Allen - Jenna Hobson
- Sarah Smyth - Monica Corelli
- Karen Robinson - Lorraine Boyle
- Bronwen Mantel - Helen Davis
- Steve Adams - Det. Polanski

== International airings ==
In France and Russia, the film is known as Séductrice malgré elle and Обольщение студента respectively and is dubbed; whereas in Spain it is called Seducción obsesiva and in Italy, Troppo sexy per Josh. Both the Italian and Spanish versions are not dubbed and instead have the respective language's subtitles, as well as the original audio track.
