= Kids Don't Tell =

1985 American drama television film

- JoBeth Williams & Michael Ontkean in a scene from Kids Don't Tell
- Genre: Drama
- Written by: Maurice Hurley
- Directed by: Sam O'Steen
- Starring: Michael Ontkean; JoBeth Williams; Ari Meyers; Leo Rossi; Leaf Phoenix
- Music by: Fred Karlin
- Country of origin: United States
- Original language: English

Production
- Executive producers: Rick Rosenberg; Robert W. Christiansen
- Producer: Barry Greenfield
- Production location: Marina del Rey, California
- Cinematography: Michael D. Margulies
- Editor: Randy Roberts
- Running time: 101 minutes
- Production companies: Chris/Rose Productions; Viacom Productions

Original release
- Network: CBS
- Release: March 5, 1985

Kids Don't Tell is a 1985 American made-for-television drama film about child molestation starring Michael Ontkean and JoBeth Williams. The docudrama, which was directed by Oscar-nominated film editor Sam O'Steen (Chinatown, Postcards from the Edge), was broadcast on CBS on March 5, 1985.

== Plot ==
Driven by a duty to his young daughter (Ari Meyers), filmmaker John Ryan (Michael Ontkean) agrees to produce a documentary on the sexual abuse of children in the American status quo. However, his loving wife Claudia (JoBeth Williams) becomes increasingly despondent and troubled as the filmmaker immerses himself further into the project. Ryan obtains participation from a host of experts in the field, including a Los Angeles police detective (Leo Rossi), who provides powerful insight into how the legal system fails, and a habitual molester (Jordan Charney), who tells of his technique for choosing and assaulting his victims.

== Cast ==
- Michael Ontkean as John Ryan
- JoBeth Williams as Claudia Ryan
- Leo Rossi as Detective Rastelli
- John Sanderford as Eli Davis
- Ari Meyers as Nicky Ryan
- Jordan Charney as Tatum
- Robin Gammell as Dr. Houghton
- Shelley Morrison as Carol
- Jean Bruce Scott as Clare
- Matthew Faison as Evan Harris
- Leaf Phoenix as Frankie
- David S. Aaron as Waiter
- Roger Askin as Man at Wedding
- Judith Barsi as Jennifer Ryan
- Gary Bayer as Speaker at Meeting
- Earl Billings as Terry
- Dennis Bowen as Ted
- Sally Brown as Jill
- Victor Campos as Dale
- Diane Cary as Sandra Luce (as Diane Civita)
- E.M. Fredric as Cocktail Waitress
- Kristin Gamboa as Linda
- Mari Gorman as Macy
- Nancy Lee Grahn as Puppet Lady
- Natalie Gregory as Krista Mueller
- David Kaufman as Kenny
- Charles Lanyer as Scotty
- Michael Laskin as Man at Park
- Christopher Lofton as Charles
- Oceana Marr as Mildred
- Bob Minor as Pool Player
- Milton Murrill as Detective Timmy
- John Napierala as David
- David Lloyd Nelson as Lyle
- Greg Nourse as Bartender
- Steve Pershing as Officer at Desk (as Stephen Pershing)
- Branscombe Richmond as Pool Player
- Jack Thibeau as Donny
- Cori Wellins as Lisa
- Jaleel White as Christofer
- Barbra Rae as Daphne
