= The Man Who Could Talk to Kids =

1973 American made-for-television drama film

- Genre: Drama
- Written by: Douglas Day Stewart
- Directed by: Donald Wrye
- Starring: Peter Boyle; Scott Jacoby
- Music by: Fred Karlin
- Country of origin: United States
- Original language: English

Production
- Producers: Robert W. Christiansen; Rick Rosenberg
- Cinematography: Gene Polito
- Editor: Walter Thompson
- Running time: 75 min.
- Production company: Tomorrow Entertainment

Original release
- Network: ABC
- Release: October 17, 1973

The Man Who Could Talk to Kids is a 1973 American made-for-television drama film directed by Donald Wrye. It was originally broadcast on ABC on October 17, 1973.

== Plot ==
When an emotionally-disturbed young boy shuts out all of his family and friends, a counselor tries to help bring him and his family together again.

== Cast ==
- Peter Boyle as Charlie Datweiler
- Scott Jacoby as Kenny Lassiter
- Collin Wilcox Paxton as Honor Lassiter
- Tyne Daly as Susie Datweiler
- Robert Reed as Tom Lassiter
- Denise Nickerson as Dena Pingitore
- Dudley Knight as Mr. Carling
