= Corey Sevier =

Canadian actor

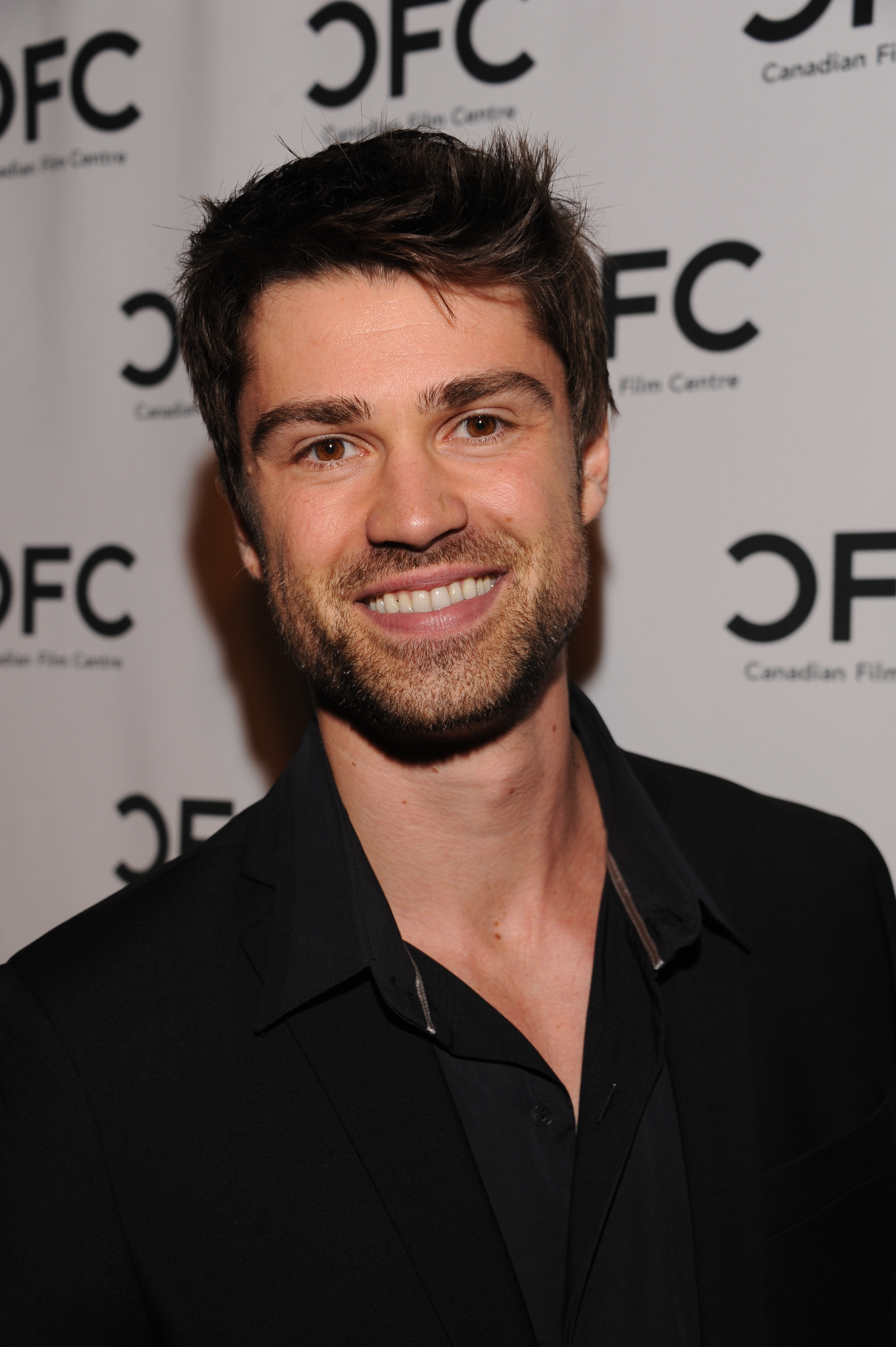
- Sevier at the Canadian Film Centre in 2012
- Born: Corey Daniel Sevier; July 3, 1984 (age 42); Ajax, Ontario, Canada
- Occupation: Actor
- Years active: 1993–present
- Spouse: Kate Pragnell
- Children: 2

Corey Daniel Sevier (born July 3, 1984) is a Canadian actor, known for his role on the Fox television series North Shore as Gabriel McKay, as Timmy Cabot in Lassie and as Jay Barry Lee in Summer of the Monkeys.

== Early life ==
Sevier was born in Ajax, Ontario, the son of Lynda and Bruce Sevier. Sevier scored a modelling job at the age of six months, winning a baby beauty pageant.

== Career ==
As a child actor, he notably appeared on the Goosebumps television series episodes "A Night in Terror Tower" and "Cry of the Cat". He made his feature film debut in the film adaptation of Wilson Rawls' Summer of the Monkeys in 1998. As a teenager, he played the role of Timmy Cabot in the 1997-1999 reboot of the Lassie TV series, and also the character Dan in the Little Men TV series in 1998 and 1999. In addition, he was the English voice actor for Mega Man Volnutt in the 1998 video game Mega Man Legends.

He later starred in the Canadian series 2030 CE as Hart Greyson. He briefly starred in the failed WB series Black Sash before landing his role on North Shore. He starred in the film Decoys and its sequel Decoys 2: Alien Seduction. He starred opposite Elizabeth Berkley in the television film Student Seduction which premiered on Lifetime in 2003. He also starred in the 2006 film Surf School. Sevier guest-starred on the show Instant Star for a two-episode arc as Hunter, an ex-convict out for revenge.

In 2007 he appeared in an episode of The Dresden Files and in the film The Secret. In 2008, he co-starred in A Broken Life, appeared in an episode of Smallville and played a character called Horace Briggs in "Still Waters", an episode of Murdoch Mysteries. Corey played the part of Carter in Ryan Little's 2007 film House of Fears.

In 2011, he had a brief role in the mythological-adventure film Immortals in which he played the role of Apollo.

From 2013 to 2015, he portrayed fisherman Seth Gunderson on Cedar Cove, a Hallmark Channel original series based on the best-selling books by Debbie Macomber.

== Personal life ==
Sevier is married to writer and producer Kate Pragnell. He announced the birth of their son Lucas in December 2018.

== Filmography ==
=== Film ===
Year	Film	Role	Notes
1994	And Then There Was One	Grim Reaper	
1995	Mrs. Munck	Rapping Boy	Uncredited
1995	Tommy Boy	Boy in Commercial	
1998	Summer of the Monkeys	Jay Berry Lee	
2002	Edge of Madness	George Herron	
2002	Between Strangers	Jeb	
2003	Detention	Mick Ashton	
2004	Decoys	Luke Callahan	
2006	Surf School	Jordan	
2007	Decoys 2: Alien Seduction	Luke Callahan	
2007	Metamorphosis	Keith	
2007	A Broken Life	Bud	
2007	The Secret	Justin	
2007	House of Fears	Carter	
2009	Wild About Harry	Sam	
2009	The Jazzman	John Kaddly	
2010	The Lost Future	Savan	
2010	A Flesh Offering	Duncan	
2011	Age of the Dragons	Ishmael	
2011	Dead Dreams	Carl Lalonde	
2011	5th & Alameda	Derek	
2011	Immortals	Apollo	
2011	Conduct Unbecoming	Captain Nick Hawkes	
2012	Osombie	Chip	
2012	Apartment 1303 3D	Mark Taylor	
2012	Awaken	Alex Hahn	
2012	Path of Souls	Brandon Eckhardt	
2014	The Dependables	Matt Stasny	Aka Pride of Lions
2015	Shadows	Glen Meyers	Short film
2015	Demon Gate	Robert	Short film
2016	The Northlander	Cygnus	
2016	Bill's Birthday Bash	Glen Myers	Voice role; short film
2016	Haley	Man	Short film
2020	The Corruption of Divine Providence	Peter Wolf	
2023	Mystery By the Book	Josh McGraw	Television filn
2025	Second Guessing Fate	Nick	Television film

=== Television ===
Year	Film	Role	Notes
1993	J.F.K.: Reckless Youth	Young Joseph P. Kennedy Jr.	2 episodes
1993	Family Pictures	Mack Eberlin (age 8)	2 episodes
1994	And Then There Was One	Grim Reaper	Television film
1994	To Save the Children	Tommy	Television film
1995	The Silence of Adultery	School Boy	Television film
1996	Monster by Mistake	Warren Patterson	Pilot Episode
1996	Critical Choices	Bradley	Television film
1996	The Haunting of Lisa	Buddy	Television film
1996	Side Effects	Paul Osuzyk	Episode: "Easy Breathing"
1996–1998	Goosebumps	Ryan / Eddie	4 Episodes
1997–1999	Lassie	Timmy Cabot	51 episodes
1998–1999	Little Men	Dan 'Looking Forward' Maddison	26 episodes
1999	Partners	Eddie	Episode: "A Beautiful Day"
2000	Real Kids, Real Adventures	John Biscello	Episode: "New Track Record: The John Biscello Story"
2000	Twice in a Lifetime	Young Ethan O'Malley	Episode: "The Frat Pack"
2002	Caitlin's Way	Charlie Sullivan	Episode: "Heartbeat"
2002–2003	2030 CE	Hart Greyson	17 episodes
2003	Black Sash	Trip Brady	8 episodes
2003	Student Seduction	Josh Gains	Television film
2003–2004	Wild Card	Julian	11 episodes
2004–2005	North Shore	Gabriel McKay	21 episodes
2005	CSI: Miami	Luke Gannon	Episode: "Blood in the Water"
2005	Code Breakers	Bob Blaik	Television film
2006	Gospel of Deceit	Luke	Television film
2006	Aquaman	Jesse	Uncredited
2007	Instant Star	Hunter	4 episodes
2007	The Dresden Files	Matthew Jacobs	Episode: "Rules of Engagement"
2007-2008	Smallville	Jacob Finlay	2 episodes: "Blue" and "Fracture"
2008	Heartland	Ryan Bailey	Episode: "Out of the Darkness"
2008	Murdoch Mysteries	Horace Briggs	Episode: "Still Waters"
2008; 2012	Psych	Bryan Frou / Brody	Episodes: "Black and Tan: A Crime of Fashion" / "(2012) Shawn and the Real Girl"
2008–2009	The Best Years	Jake	3 episodes
2010	The Lost Future	Savan	Television film
2012	A Star for Christmas	Alex	Television film
2012	The Listener	Kyle Burrows	Episode: "Crossed"
2013–2014	Cedar Cove	Seth Gunderson	14 episodes
2014	Supernatural	Larry	Episode: "The Purge"
2014	Motive	Jake Daly	Episode: "Bad Blonde"
2014	Stolen from the Womb	Jesse Miller	Television film
2014	The Tree That Saved Christmas	Lucas Bishop	Television film
2015	Win, Lose or Love	Alex Kramerr	Television film
2015	Mistresses	David Hudson	5 episodes
2016	Mr. Write	Michael	Television film
2017	The Art of Us	Rick	Television film
2017	Four Christmases and a Wedding	Evan Mathers	Television film (Lifetime)
2017	The Wrong Bed: Naked Pursuit	Owen Michaels	Television film
2018	Northern Lights of Christmas	Alec Wynn	Television film (Hallmark)
2019	Matchmaker Christmas	Jaxson Jones	Television film (Lifetime)
2019	Grounded For Christmas	Brady	Television film (Lifetime)
2019	Shattered Memories	Dan Moore	Television film
2020	Heart of the Holidays	Noah	Television film (Hallmark); also director
2021	It Takes a Christmas Village	Darcy Hawkins	Television film (Lifetime); also director
2021	Love in Whitbrooke	Jason Taylor	Television film
2021	Love in Translation	Dan	Television film
2021	Moonshine	Duffy Corkum	Episode: "Zen and the Art of Midlife Maintenance"
2021	Private Eyes	Jared Brenner	Episode: "In the Arms of Morpheus"
2022	The Secret Sauce	Jim Covell	Television film
2022	Meet Me in New York	Joe	Television film
2022	Road Trip Romance	Alden Brown	Television film (Hallmark)
2022	Lemonade Stand Romance	Evan Payton	Television film (Hallmark)
2022	Pumpkin Everything	Kit	Television film (Hallmark)
2022	Christmas on Mistletoe Lake	Ray	Television film
2022	Christmas Plus One	Michael Williams	Television film
2022	Noel Next Door	Jeremy Greer	Television film (Hallmark)
2023	The Dog Lovers Guide to Dating	Simon	Television film (Hallmark)
2023	Everything Christmas	Zack	Television film (Hallmark)
2023	Take Me Back for Christmas	Aaron	Television film (Hallmark); also director
2024	Jazz Ramsey: A K-9 Mystery	Nick Kolesov	Television film (Hallmark)
2024	The Christmas Charade	Josh	Television film (Hallmark)
2024	The Heiress and the Handyman	Bart	Television film (Hallmark)
2025	Rodeo Christmas Romance	Noal Holliday	Television film

=== Video games ===
Year	Title	Role	Notes
1997	Mega Man Legends	Mega Man Volnutt	English version

== Filmmaking credits ==
Year	Title	Director	Producer	Notes
2011	Dead Dreams	No	Yes	
2012	Path of Souls	No	Yes	
2016	Haley	Yes	Yes	Short film
2020	Heart of the Holidays	Yes	No	
2021	It Takes a Christmas Village	Yes	No	
2023	Take Me Back for Christmas	Yes	No	

== Awards and nominations ==
Year	Award	Category	Nominated work	Result	Notes	Ref.
1999	Gemini Awards	Best Performance in a Children's or Youth Program or Series	Lassie (Episode: "Full Circle")	Nominated		
1999	YTV Achievement Awards	Acting Achievement Award	—N/a	Won		
1999	Young Artist Awards	Best Performance in a TV Drama Series - Supporting Young Actor	Little Men	Nominated		
2000	Young Artist Awards	Best Performance in a TV Series	Little Men	Nominated		
2002	Young Artist Awards	Best Performance in a TV Drama Series - Guest Starring Young Actor	Twice in a Lifetime	Nominated		
2011	Action on Film International Film Festival	Best Actor - Feature	5th & Alameda	Won		
2017	Leo Awards	Best Direction in a Short Drama	Haley	Nominated		
2017	Leo Awards	Best Performance by a Male in a Short Drama	Haley	Nominated		
2017	Leo Awards	Best Picture Editing in a Short Drama	Haley	Nominated		
2017	Leo Awards	Best Short Drama	Haley	Nominated	Shared with Kate Pragnell	
2017	Be Epic! London International Film Festival	Best Short Film	Haley	Nominated	Shared with Kate Pragnell	
2017	Canada Shorts Film Festival	Best Short Film	Haley	Won	Shared with Kate Pragnell	
2017	LA Shorts Awards	Best Short Film	Haley	Won	Shared with Kate Pragnell	
2017	Los Angeles Cinefest	Best Short Film	Haley	Nominated	Shared with Kate Pragnell	
2017	Sydney Indie Film Festival	Best Science Fiction Short Film	Haley	Nominated	Shared with Kate Pragnell	
2018	Boston Science Fiction Film Festival	Best of Fest	Haley	Won	Shared with Kate Pragnell	
2022	Canadian Screen Awards	Best Leader Actor - TV Movie	Love in Translation	Nominated		
