= North Shore (2004 TV series) =

American soap opera

- The cast
- Created by: Peter Elkoff
- Starring: Kristoffer Polaha; Corey Sevier; James Remar; Brooke Burns; Shannen Doherty; Amanda Righetti; Jason Momoa; Nikki DeLoach; Jay Kenneth Johnson
- Country of origin: United States
- Original language: English
- No. of seasons: 1
- No. of episodes: 21 (1 unaired)

Production
- Executive producer: Bert Salke
- Producers: Harry V. Bring; Bill Nuss; Liz Heldens; Patrick R. Norris
- Running time: 20 minutes
- Production companies: Brancato/Salke Productions; Confidential Pictures Inc. 20th Century Fox Television

Original release
- Network: Fox
- Release: June 14, 2004 – January 13, 2005

North Shore is an American prime-time soap opera that aired on Fox on Mondays at 8 p.m. EST (7 p.m. CST) for seven months in 2004 and 2005. It centered on the staff and guests of the fictional Grand Waimea Hotel and Resort (actually the real-life Turtle Bay Resort located near Kahuku, O'ahu) on Oahu's North Shore in Hawaii.

From Fox's website:

Intrigue abounds at the Grand Waimea Hotel, an exclusive Hawaiian escape for the wealthy, powerful and beautiful. Hawaiian native Jason Matthews runs the hotel and makes sure every guest gets everything they need. But when former flame Nicole Booth arrives as the hotel's new Director of Guest Relations, Jason's world is turned upside down. But Grand Waimea owner, Vincent Colville, is staying on top of him to make sure his past with Nicole won't affect their work life.

North Shore premiered on June 14, 2004, with a 13-episode commitment from Fox. The show was canceled in January 2005 after a 21-episode, single-season run. The show ended on a cliffhanger, and the final episode of the series has only had a single airing, not being shown in most territories (including America).

== Plot ==
The central character is Jason Matthews, General Manager of the Grand Waimea. In the first episode, Nicole Booth is hired as the new Director of Guest Relations. She is the daughter of a ruthless billionaire, and an old flame of Jason's who broke his heart years before. At the end of the first episode, Nicole reveals to Jason that she broke up with him because her father wanted her to date someone more successful, and he threatened to have Jason fired from the hotel he was working at the time. The chances for rekindled romance are then dashed when Nicole reveals she has become engaged since they broke up.

Later in the series, Nicole told Jason that she returned to Hawaii to seek him out before getting married, because she wanted to know if there was still a chance for their relationship.

== Cast and characters ==
=== Main ===
- Kristoffer Polaha as Jason Matthews, the General Manager of the Grand Waimea, who shares a past with Nicole.
- Brooke Burns as Nicole Booth, the new Director of Guest Relations, and Jason's former flame who broke his heart years before.
- Corey Sevier as Gabriel McKay, a lifeguard (he seems to alternate between guarding the pool and the beach); in episode three it was mentioned that he is planning to "turn pro" as a surfer. He does end up turning pro, with varying degrees of success.
- Nikki DeLoach as MJ Bevans, a waitress at the hotel bar; she is trying to start her own island clothing line. She starts the show in a relationship with Chris, but they end up breaking up. However, they get back together by the end of the show/season.
- Jason Momoa as Frankie Seau, the hotel bartender. He ends the season involved with Tessa.
- Jay Kenneth Johnson as Chris Remsen, MJ's nascent boyfriend and proprietor of an extreme sports business. Despite breaking up, they end up back together by the final episode.
- Amanda Righetti as Tessa Lewis, a former con artist who manipulates her way into the Assistant Concierge position. By the end of the show, she is involved with Frankie.
- James Remar as Vincent Colville, the hotel owner; he was in love with Nicole's mother before her family forced her to marry Walter Booth.

=== Recurring ===
- Michael Ontkean as Gordy Matthews, Jason's father and a local surfing legend who owns a local bar and surfboard shop; his home was burned down in the first season and Jason suspects Walter Booth was involved.
- Josh Hopkins as Morgan Holt, Nicole's fiancé who works for her father in New York as Head of Hotel Acquisitions. Morgan visited the hotel for an extended period, and his relationship with Jason vacillated from friendly to hostile and vice versa several times. Nicole left Morgan at the altar during the first season. He hasn't been seen since.
- Robert Kekaula as Sam, the head of hotel security.
- Christopher McDonald as Walter Booth, Nicole's billionaire father who wants to buy the Grand Waimea by whatever means necessary; he and Vincent have a long-standing rivalry dating back to Vincent's affair with Walter's wife; Vincent is convinced Walter killed his wife as revenge. He ends up in jail.
- Shannen Doherty as Alexandra Hudson, Walter Booth's supposed illegitimate child by a secretary – thus making her Nicole's half-sister. She conspires with her father to take over the Grand Waimea. She ends up in a position of power in the hotel. Though none of the other characters, with the exception of Chris whom she briefly dates, really like her, a few do respect her.
- Dominic Purcell as Tommy Ravetto

=== Guest stars ===
- Dylan Bruno as Trey, MJ's former boyfriend and pro surfer. He tries to win MJ back, even kidnapping her at one point, before she is rescued by Chris and Gabriel.

== Episodes ==
No.	Title	Directed by	Written by	Original release date	Prod. code
1	"Pilot"	Michael Dinner	Peter Elkoff	June 14, 2004	1AJE01
2	"Tessa"	Patrick Norris	Liz Heldens	June 21, 2004	1AJE02
3	"Surprise Party"	James Marshall	Kevin Falls & Matt McGuinness	June 28, 2004	1AJE03
4	"Meteor Shower"	Craig Zisk	Kevin Falls & Matt McGuinness	July 5, 2004	1AJE04
5	"My Boyfriend's Back"	David Straiton	Dana Baratta	July 12, 2004	1AJE05
6	"Secret Service"	David Grossman	Jeff Rake	July 19, 2004	1AJE06
7	"More"	Michael Fresco	Liz Heldens	August 2, 2004	1AJE07
8	"Burned"	Kevin Hooks	Karyn Usher	August 9, 2004	1AJE08
9	"Ties That Bind"	Patrick Norris	Gretchen J. Berg & Aaron Harberts	September 6, 2004	1AJE09
10	"Vice"	Kenneth Biller	Kenneth Biller	September 13, 2004	1AJE10
11	"Alexandra"	Steve Miner	Chris Brancato	September 20, 2004	1AJE11
12	"Bellport"	Patrick Norris	Peter Elkoff	September 27, 2004	1AJE12
13	"Leverage"	Elodie Keene	Kevin Falls & Matt McGuinness	November 4, 2004	1AJE13
14	"Illusions"	George Mendeluk	Kimberly Costello	November 11, 2004	1AJE14
15	"The Big One"	Patrick Norris	Gretchen J. Berg & Aaron Harberts	November 18, 2004	1AJE15
16	"The Cook, the Waitress, the GM and His Lover"	Kenneth Biller	Kenneth Biller & Dana Baratta	December 2, 2004	1AJE16
17	"Sucker Punch"	Perry Lang	Liz Heldens	December 9, 2004	1AJE17
18	"Catwalk"	Michael Fresco	Colleen McGuinness	December 16, 2004	1AJE18
19	"Shark"	Alan Myerson	Kevin Falls & Matt McGuinness	January 6, 2005	1AJE19
20	"The Ex-Games"	Fred Gerber	Amy Berg & Andrew Colville	January 13, 2005	1AJE20
21	"The End"	Elodie Keene	Karyn Usher	Unaired	1AJE21

== Critical reception ==
Critics described the series as "soapy". Mediaweek called it "a cardboard drama about a bunch of pretty, shallow twenty-somethings populating a hotel in Hawaii", noting that it lacked "characters with problems the audience can relate to" and arguing that "North Shore needs to find a better balance of escape and realism to succeed".
