= A Chance of Snow =

- DVD cover
- Genre: Drama
- Directed by: Tony Bill
- Starring: JoBeth Williams; Michael Ontkean; Charles Durning; Dey Young; Barbara Barrie
- Music by: Van Dyke Parks
- Country of origin: United States
- Original language: English

Production
- Executive producers: Orly Adelson; Jeffrey Auerbach; Gary Pearl; Kurt Inderbitzin
- Production location: Minneapolis
- Cinematography: Bing Sokolsky
- Editor: Axel Hubert
- Running time: 87 minutes
- Production company: Hearst Entertainment

Original release
- Network: Lifetime
- Release: December 7, 1998

A Chance of Snow is an American Christmas TV movie starring JoBeth Williams and Michael Ontkean and directed by Tony Bill. It premiered on Lifetime Television on December 7, 1998.

== Plot ==
The film revolves around Maddie Parker, who is on the verge of divorcing her sportswriter husband, Matt Parker, after his brief, extra-marital affair.

When the snow fall has affects flights at the Minneapolis–Saint Paul International Airport on Christmas Eve, Maddie and Matt find themselves included with the many passengers who are stranded at the terminal. This gives them ample time to talk about their relationship and rediscover love through second chances.

== Cast ==
- JoBeth Williams as Madeline "Maddie" Parker-Hill
- Michael Ontkean as Matthew "Matt" Hill
- Barbara Barrie as Ruth Pulmer
- Dey Young as Katherine Parker
- Peter Syvertsen as Craig Johnson
- Dina Merrill as Merilee Parker
- Charles Durning as Earl Pulmer

== Reception ==
On Radio Times, the film has a 2/5 rating.

== See also ==
- List of Christmas films
