= Lassie (1997 TV series) =

Children's television series

- Starring: Corey Sevier; Susan Almgren; Tim Post; Walter Massey
- Countries of origin: Canada; United Kingdom; United States
- No. of seasons: 3
- No. of episodes: 52

Production
- Executive producers: Micheline Charest; Ronald A. Weinberg; Eric Ellenbogen
- Running time: 30 minutes
- Production companies: CINAR Films; PolyGram Filmed Entertainment; Golden Books Family Entertainment

Original release
- Network: YTV
- Release: March 2, 1997 – 1999

Lassie is a children's television series which aired from 1997 to 1999 on YTV in Canada and Sunday nights on the Animal Planet network in the United States, as a modified remake of the original Lassie series (1954–1973) about a boy and his faithful dog. As with previous Lassie TV versions and several films dating back to the original Lassie Come Home film of 1943, the star was Lassie, a trained Rough Collie.

== Production ==
Not to be confused with a previous, syndicated follow-up series entitled The New Lassie which aired 1989–1991, the Canadian-produced Lassie series starred Corey Sevier as 13-year-old Timmy Cabot in the fictional town of Hudson Falls, Vermont. The show was filmed in Quebec by Cinar Inc. In the series' story line, Timmy and his recently widowed mother, Dr. Karen Cabot, move to Hudson Falls, where Karen takes over a veterinary practice.

In the first (1997) season, Lassie was played by "Howard", an eighth generation collie descended from "Pal", the dog in the original 1943 movie Lassie Come Home. As with all previous Lassie movies and television series beginning with Pal, Howard was owned and trained by Weatherwax Trained Dogs, founded by brothers Frank and Rudd Weatherwax. Midway through production, Cinar replaced Howard with a non-Pal descended dog. Following Lassie fan protests, "Hey Hey II", son of Howard and a ninth-generation direct descendant of Pal, was brought in to assume the role of Lassie for the final thirteen episodes of the show.

Although young Corey Sevier impressed critics, others complained that the series relegated Lassie to a bystander role by focusing more on the Cabot family's dealings with various townspeople, at the expense of featuring Lassie's action stunts and feats as had been traditional in the famous canine's previous movie and TV incarnations.

The show was canceled after three seasons. A total of 52 episodes were produced.

The entire first season has been available on DVD in Canada since April 4, 2006.

== Cast ==
- Corey Sevier as Timmy Cabot (all episodes)
- Susie Almgren as Dr. Karen Cabot (all episodes)
- Walter Massey as Dr. Donald Stewart (all episodes)
- Tim Post as Ethan Bennet (51 episodes)
- Tod Fennell as Jeff Mackenzie
- Nathalie Vansier as Natalie
- Al Vandecruys as Jay Mack Mackenzie
- Chip Chuipka as Hank
- Ricky Mabe as Sean "Murph" Murphy (7 episodes)
- Michael Yarmush as Clark Cairo (3 episodes)
- Tyler Hynes as Darren (2 episodes)

== Episodes ==
=== Season 1 ===
EP	TITLE	STORIES
1	"The Great Escape"	Timmy finds an injured collie after she cleverly escapes from the junk yard of her neglectful owner, "Hollerin" Hank Cranford. But just as Timmy and the collie, named Lassie, become instant friends, Hank returns to claim her, leaving a despondent Timmy.
2	"Lassie Comes Home"	Hollerin' Hank Cranford becomes accidentally pinned under a pile of junk yard rubble. Lassie escapes and goes to get Timmy for help, but will it be in time to save Hank?
3	"Swamp Thing"	Lassie tries to warn the unsuspecting Timmy and Billie that an alligator is loose in the swamp, where they've gone to look for the local legend, "Ol' Joe", the Swamp Thing.
4	"The Raft"	Lassie swims a river to bring a rope to a runaway raft that's carrying Timmy and Jeff towards a treacherous man-made waterfall.
5	"Horse Healer"	Lassie helps to restore the shattered faith of a "horse healer" named Maude Windrunner as she struggles to cure Lassie's friend, the Thoroughbred Shadow.
6	"Biker Boys"	Lassie and Timmy try to save a young boy stuck on the edge of a cliff after Lassie's playful Jack Russell Terrier friend, Mel, moves a pylon and warning tape from the path of a kids bike race.
7	"Where's Timmy?"	Only the pre-planned arrival of a famous ballplayer in Hudson Falls prevents Timmy from going to New York when he thinks everyone's forgotten his birthday. But Karen's got some surprises in mind!.
8	"Lassie is Missing"	Hollerin' Hank secretly steals Lassie away from Timmy, but for what reason? Is it to help Lassie or hurt her?
9	"The Big Smoke"	Even though Lassie led them to it, she strongly disapproves when Jeff and Timmy try to sell a stash of smuggled Cuban cigars buried in a crypt, instead of turning it in.
10	"Open Season"	Lassie leads Karen to a fawn left motherless by a hunter while Doc Stewart instructs Timmy in proper hunting safety over mom's objections.
11	"The Feud"	Timmy and Lassie develop a clever act to convince Jeff's father (Jay Mac) and Ethan to stop a silly feud between the two men.
12	"A Day in the Life"	Timmy chooses Lassie and Natalie choose Big Bob, (among others) as subjects for a school assignment on "A Day In The Life" of someone important to him.
13	"Cats Out of the Bag"	A litter of lost kittens serve as the focus for both Timmy and Doc Stewart, as they learn to let go of elements from their pasts.
14	"On the Case"	A boy's penchant for stealing shoes reveals a troubled personality, but Lassie intervenes to help him.
15	"Sweet Science"	Lassie can't help Timmy fight his battles with Oliver, a misunderstood school bully. And though she disapproves of Ethan's boxing lessons, Karen realizes that Timmy has to learn to defend himself, which he does, but not in the usual way.
16	"Poster Pup"	Karen and Ethan are about to leave for a veterinarian association dinner where Karen is scheduled to give an important speech when Timmy gets food poisoning and a horse needs immediate emergency aid.
17	"Rush to Judgment"	When all the town's dogs mysteriously fall sick, Ethan's uncle Roy is falsely accused of poisoning them. Lassie must solve the mystery and save both Roy and the other dogs.
18	"Fathers and Sons"	When Ethan offers to take Timmy to The Hudson Falls Booster Association's Father and Son night, Karen and Timmy have a heart to heart about the absence of his late dad in their lives. Lassie's wisdom convinces the boy that his life must go on.
19	"That Boy-Girl Thing"	When Timmy and Natalie team up on a science project, everyone teases them about being an "item", or in love. Timmy must choose between his reputation and friendship.
20	"Friends of Mr. Cairo"	Timmy's diplomacy and friendships are put to the test when he becomes the director of the school play.
21	"Bone of Contention"	When Lassie digs up a buried artifact, Timmy saves a Native American burial ground from destruction.
22	"The Great Emu Hunt"	When kids join the search for an escaped emu, Timmy and Lassie get trapped inside an abandoned mine. While all the town mounts a search for the boy, Lassie tries to escape from the mine to get help.
23	"Not on the Map"	Sequel to "The Great Emu Hunt"; Lassie resumes her quest to save Timmy, who has been trapped in an abandoned mineshaft.
24	"Dog Gone It!"	Lassie and Mel are stranded in Montréal where they must fend for themselves while finding their way home to Hudson Falls.
25	"Collie Confusion"	Lassie is misidentified as the nasty collie that has been terrorizing a local farmer's livestock.
26	"The Lassie Files"	Lassie must solve the mystery of a series of UFO sightings over Hudson Falls that has the town all a buzz with speculation.

=== Season 2 ===
EP	TITLE	STORIES
27	"Dad's Watch"	Only Lassie can set things right when Timmy disobeys his mother and takes a precious heirloom to baseball practice.
28	"Responsibility"	Timmy, left in charge of the clinic, loses a pregnant rabbit and a hungry boa constrictor.
29	"Wild Goose Chase"	Lassie is befriended by a goose.
30	"Tale of the Noisy Ghost"	Timmy takes an overnight camping trip with his pals, and tells a ghost story about the old Cabot house.
31	"Full Circle"	Timmy consoles a forlorn girl with a sick cat; Ethan has trouble with his adopted greyhound.
32	"Chain Letter"	Timmy gets the bright idea to write chain letters and ends up finding trouble when he sends Lassie out to receive and send.
33	"Monkeyin' Around"	A movie star and his monkey come to town with calamitous results.
34	"Trains & Boats & Planes" (2 pts)	Timmy and his friends enter a paper-airplane contest in hopes of winning a trip to NASA headquarters. Part 1 of two.
35	"Conclusion"	Timmy and Lassie make a daring escape from a moving train; Hank and Jeff go joy-riding in a vintage airplane. Part 2 of two.
36	"Manhunt"	An innocent man in police custody escapes and is befriended by Lassie, who persuades him to turn himself in.
37	"Pet Therapy"	Timmy enters Lassie into a pet therapy program, with surprising results.
38	"Amazing Grace"	The faithful collie collapses as Timmy and his friends rehearse for a charity show.
39	"Mayor for a Day"	Timmy and his friends are hustled by the locals.

=== Season 3 ===
EP	TITLE	STORIES
40	"Sam Dupree"	Timmy gets a big surprise from a street musician who's not what he appears to be.
41	"The Good Neighbor"	Timmy leads the stakeout of an illegal toxic dump site, hoping to bring the polluter to justice.
42	"The Boy Who Cried Wolf"	Timmy sees a wolf on April Fool's Day.
43	"Feathered Friends"	Timmy and Jeff try their hand at the egg business.
44	"Hookie for Hockey"	Jeff and Timmy are witnesses to a robbery while they're playing hooky.
45	"Fit to Print"	Timmy and his pals publish a controversial newspaper.
46	"Mad Dog"	Timmy and his pals think Buddy is rabid.
47	"Secrets and Lies"	Jeff's disappearance forces Timmy and Natalie to choose between keeping a promise and helping a friend.
48	"New Dog in Town"	A stray basset hound chews up an exchange student's homework and the faithful collie has to persuade Timmy to do the right thing.
49	"Breakout"	The new and overeager animal control officer meets his match in Lassie.
50	"Bear Necessities"	Lassie finds little bear traps set by poachers.
51	"Graduation"	Lassie's original owner arrives to take her back from Timmy. Part 1 of two.
52	"Conclusion"	Timmy and Lassie are reunited. Part 2 of two.

== Tie-in book ==
A Golden Book based on the first episode, sharing the title of The Great Escape, was written by Diane Muldrow and published in 1998.

== DVD release ==
Direct Source released the complete first season on DVD in Region 1 in 2006. The DVD release edition is now out of print.
