= Black Sash (TV series) =

American television series

- Genre: Action; Drama
- Created by: Robert Mark Kamen
- Starring: Russell Wong; Sarah Carter; Ray J; Missy Peregrym; Corey Sevier; Mako
- Country of origin: United States
- Original language: English
- No. of seasons: 1
- No. of episodes: 8 (2 unaired)

Production
- Executive producer: Robert Mark Kamen
- Running time: 45 minutes
- Production companies: The Sash Films Inc.; Tollin/Robbins Productions; Warner Bros. Television

Original release
- Network: The WB
- Release: March 30 – June 1, 2003

Black Sash is an American action adventure drama television series starring Russell Wong. It ran from March 30 to June 1, 2003. Including pilots, a total of eight episodes were made; however, only six episodes were aired on The WB.

== Plot ==
Tom Chang (Russell Wong) is a former undercover narcotics cop who was framed for smuggling heroin and spent five years incarcerated in a Hong Kong prison. Having lost his career, his wife (Ona Grauer), and even the legal right to see his pre-teen daughter Claire (Valerie Tian), he returns home to San Francisco to try to restore his former life. Tom's long-time mentor, Master Li (Mako), now an elderly man, gives Tom his Chinese martial arts kwoon to run as well as lodging in an adjacent building on the wharf.

Tom, affectionately called "Mr. C" by his students, teaches "the art of 8 palm changes" (Baguazhang), and, by the following year, students at the kwoon include several Marina Park High School students, including tomboyish, motorcycle-riding Tori Stratton (Missy Peregrym) and aspiring musician Bryan Lanier (Ray J). As the series begins, they are joined at the kwoon by Trip Brady (Corey Sevier), dancer Allie Bennett (Sarah Carter), and the troubled new kid in town, Nick Reed (Drew Fuller). Nick lives with his police inspector aunt, who is a former trainee of Tom's years before when she was new to the police force. Nick's father is a diplomat who is newly posted to Cairo, and Nick's parents have sent him to live with Nick's mother's sister to provide stability for him so that he may finish high school. Nick, by his own reckoning, is well-versed in other form of martial arts, including kung fu, karate, taekwondo, wushu, savate, and Jeet Kune Do, but was nevertheless previously a disciplinary problem in Germany and Singapore while living with his parents. Tom allows Nick to begin training at his school. Trip, on his own and otherwise homeless after his abusive father is imprisoned, lives in the kwoon with Tom in exchange for doing chores for the school. Trip also gets a part-time job as a waiter at an Italian restaurant to earn some extra money for his personal life. Allie initially has a crush on Bryan, and even takes notes in school for him, but ultimately decides to stop chasing him. Bryan provides disc jockey services for their high school's dance squad performances and, occasionally, at local parties. Tori's policeman father has recently been killed in the line of duty and, in the pilot episode, Tom helps the police apprehend the man responsible.

The series largely revolves around Tom's blossoming relationship with his young daughter (who sneaks away from her parents to visit him periodically), his interactions with his ex-wife and her new husband Phillip (who completely despises Tom and adopted Claire during Tom's incarceration), Tom's role as a mentor to the high school students who attend his martial arts school, and on the romantic relationships of its five primary teenage characters. In one episode, Master Li's wayward son, Jing, returns from Hong Kong under the guise of taking his place as the head of his father's kwoon, when in reality he means to sell the property to wealthy Chinese businessmen as a means of a quick cash grab. However, Tom reveals the truth of Jing's intentions to Master Li and Jing is banished by his father, forbidden to return. In another episode, Nick is suspected of murder when a fellow high school student that attacked Nick at a party winds up dead, but Allie discovers it was the deceased's girlfriend who was the real murderer. In one episode, Bryan takes a job as a bouncer at a club when he learns that the DJ position is filled. Meanwhile, Allie nearly falls prey to a college-age boy with a history of sexual assault, but she and Tori manage to turn the tables on the would-be assailant.

== Cast ==
- Russell Wong as Tom Chang
- Sarah Carter as Allie Bennett
- Ray J as Bryan Lanier
- Missy Peregrym as Tori Stratton
- Corey Sevier as Trip Brady
- Drew Fuller as Nick Reed
- Ona Grauer as Beth Rodgers
- Valerie Tian as Claire Rodgers
- Martin Cummins as Phillip Rodgers
- Mako as Master Li

== Production ==
Although Black Sash was set in San Francisco, it was filmed in and around Vancouver, British Columbia. The theme song for the show is the Greenwheel song "Breathe".

Regarding the show's failure, one of the show's producers, Carlton Cuse, said: "I think everyone involved made a noble effort, but at the end of the day it just wasn’t a TV show that worked. Most don’t!"

== Episodes ==
| No. | Title | Original release date | Prod. code | Viewers (millions) |
|---|---|---|---|---|
| 1 | "Pilot" | March 30, 2003 | 175900 | N/A |
Disgraced ex-cop Tom Chang returns to San Francisco to start over and teach martial arts to troubled teenagers.
| 2 | "Jump Start" | April 6, 2003 | 175903 | 3 |
Trip must collect money from a criminal for his father's former associates; Bryan encourages a hesitant Allie to try out for the dance team.
| 3 | "Date Night" | April 13, 2003 | 175904 | 2.8 |
Bryan gets into trouble when he becomes friends with a new student; Tom meets a woman who has a connection with one of his students.
| 4 | "Prodigal Son" | April 20, 2003 | 175905 | 2.7 |
Master Li's errant son returns to take over the dojo and Tom's classes, leaving him with nowhere to live.
| 5 | "Prime Suspect" | May 25, 2003 | 175906 | 2.3 |
Police accuse Nick of stabbing Allie's ex-boyfriend to death, and the gang sets out to prove his innocence.
| 6 | "Snapshots" | June 1, 2003 | 175907 | 2 |
Tori discovers Allie's date has a dangerous past; Beth's new husband threatens Tom; Bryan gets a job as a bouncer at a bar with sleazy patrons.
| 7 | "Like a Virgin" | Unaired | 175908 | N/A |
Note: This episode was unaired on The WB.
| 8 | "The Bounty Hunter" | Unaired | 175909 | N/A |
Note: This episode was unaired on The WB.
