= The Ghost Belonged to Me =

1975 novel by Richard Peck

- First edition
- Author: Richard Peck
- Language: English
- Genre: Children's novel
- Publisher: Viking Press
- Publication date: 1975
- Publication place: United States
- Media type: Print (hardback & paperback)
- Pages: 183pp
- ISBN: 0-670-33767-6
- OCLC: 1174625
- LC Class: PZ7.P338 Gh
- Followed by: Ghosts I Have Been

The Ghost Belonged to Me is a novel written for children by Richard Peck, author of Newbery Medal-winning A Year Down Yonder.

== Plot ==
The book is set in 1913. Alexander Armsworth is a normal boy until he sees the ghost of a girl in his barn, warning him of an impending disaster. This leads him to become a local hero. When he explains that a ghost warned him, it uncovers the story of how she came to rest on their property, far from her home in New Orleans, Louisiana. He takes it upon himself to take her body home to New Orleans.

== Main characters ==
=== Alexander Armsworth ===
13-year-old Alexander is informed by his classmate Blossom Culp that he is receptive to ghosts. When she tells him his barn is haunted, he thinks that she is playing a trick on him. Eventually he meets the ghost of Inez Dumaine, who haunts his barn. With her help he saves the lives of others when a madman sets a fire to a trestle in hopes of crashing the trolley. Alexander becomes a local hero, but when he explains he had help from a ghostly source, it leads to a journey to return her body to New Orleans. With the help of Blossom, and his great uncle Miles, he eventually returns her body, to be placed within her family's crypt.

=== Blossom Culp ===
She is a 12-year-old girl who first informs Alexander of his ability to see ghosts. She lives in a shack by the trolley tracks, and she helps Alexander on his trip to return Inez's body to New Orleans.

=== Uncle Miles Armsworth ===
Alexander's great uncle is a carpenter who works as he pleases. He is the only one who knows the history of Captain Campbell and Inez Dumaine. He accompanies Blossom and Alexander to New Orleans, and sees to it that Inez returns home.

=== Inez Dumaine ===
She is the ghost that haunts the Armsworth barn. She warns Alexander about the man who damaged the trestle bridge, so he can save others. She tells him her body is buried nearby and asks to be returned to her family, who were "above ground, but they rest."

== Real-life inspirations ==
According to Peck's autobiography, Anonymously Yours, several characters and places were based on reality.

Uncle Miles Armsworth was based on his uncle, Miles Peck, who even in his eighties continued with his carpentry, and, like Alexander's uncle, "he worked when he wanted to, he fished when he wanted to, and he said rude things in front of people's mothers. I thought he was God."

Blossom Culp voice came from Peck's grandmother and great-aunts, and speaks in their combined voice, "never wrong and always precise except for grammar."

The Snake Creek trestle bridge in The Ghost Belonged to Me was inspired by Williams Creek trestle bridge in Decatur, Illinois.

== Film adaptations ==
In 1978, the book was adapted into a television film by Walt Disney Productions entitled Child of Glass.

In 1979, a portion of the book was adapted into the anthology film Once Upon a Midnight Scary, released on home video by CBS Library. The film was hosted by Vincent Price, encouraging young viewers to read the book in order to learn the full story. Alexander was played by Christian Berrigan, Blossom was played by Jessica Pennington, and Inez (credited as "girl ghost") was played by Alexandria Johnson. Other books partially adapted for the anthology film were The Legend of Sleepy Hollow by Washington Irving and The House with a Clock in Its Walls by John Bellairs.
