= Cerro Gordo, Illinois =

Cerro Gordo
- Village
- Municipal building

- Location of Cerro Gordo in Piatt County, Illinois.
- Coordinates: 39°53′21″N 88°44′04″W
- Country: United States
- State: Illinois
- County: Piatt
- Township: Cerro Gordo

Area
  - Total: 0.73 sq mi (1.89 km^{2})
  - Land: 0.73 sq mi (1.89 km^{2})
  - Water: 0 sq mi (0.00 km^{2})
- Elevation: 738 ft (225 m)

Population (2020)
  - Total: 1,316
  - Density: 1,805.8/sq mi (697.23/km^{2})
- Time zone: UTC-6 (CST)
  - Summer (DST): UTC-5 (CDT)
- ZIP code: 61818
- Area code: 217
- FIPS code: 17-12268
- GNIS ID: 2397594
- Website: www.fathill.com

Cerro Gordo, nicknamed Fat Hill, is a town in Piatt County, Illinois, United States. The population was 1,316 at the 2020 census.

== History ==
When the Mexican–American War began General John S. Williams took command. At the battle of Cerro Gordo (Mexico) he led the troops in a victory over Mexican troops. He took the nickname of "Cerro Gordo" Williams. After the battle, he returned to Illinois and settled in Bement. About the same time (1855) the people of the town of Griswold chose to move the town from the stagecoach line along the river to the path of the Great Western Railroad. The town was platted by Sheridan Wait and Henry Durfee. "Cerro Gordo" Williams was one of the citizens, and as the town had other citizens who fought in the battle of Cerro Gordo, they selected the name Cerro Gordo. When the Civil War erupted, "Cerro Gordo" Williams returned to Kentucky and became a general in the Army of the Confederacy. On May 31, 1864, his residence was destroyed by fire, with arson being suspected. After the Civil War, with "Cerro Gordo" Williams having nothing to return to, moved to a farm near Mount Sterling, KY and served in the Kentucky legislature.

Cerro Gordo was the birthplace of Charlie Taylor, an inventor and mechanic who created the engine used in the first powered flight by the Wright Brothers in 1903.

== Geography ==
According to the 2010 census, Cerro Gordo has a total area of 0.77 square miles (1.99 km^{2}), all land.

== Demographics ==
Historical population
Census	Pop.	Note	%±
1880	565		—
1890	939		66.2%
1900	1,008		7.3%
1910	876		−13.1%
1920	1,003		14.5%
1930	965		−3.8%
1940	1,016		5.3%
1950	1,052		3.5%
1960	1,067		1.4%
1970	1,368		28.2%
1980	1,553		13.5%
1990	1,437		−7.5%
2000	1,436		−0.1%
2010	1,403		−2.3%
2020	1,316		−6.2%
U.S. Decennial Census

=== 2020 census ===
As of the 2020 census, Cerro Gordo had a population of 1,316. The median age was 40.9 years. 24.2% of residents were under the age of 18 and 17.5% of residents were 65 years of age or older. For every 100 females there were 95.3 males, and for every 100 females age 18 and over there were 94.5 males age 18 and over.

0.0% of residents lived in urban areas, while 100.0% lived in rural areas.

There were 549 households in Cerro Gordo, of which 33.9% had children under the age of 18 living in them. Of all households, 51.4% were married-couple households, 17.1% were households with a male householder and no spouse or partner present, and 25.9% were households with a female householder and no spouse or partner present. About 26.6% of all households were made up of individuals and 12.4% had someone living alone who was 65 years of age or older.

There were 593 housing units, of which 7.4% were vacant. The homeowner vacancy rate was 3.6% and the rental vacancy rate was 10.8%.

Racial composition as of the 2020 census
Race	Number	Percent
White	1,236	93.9%
Black or African American	6	0.5%
American Indian and Alaska Native	4	0.3%
Asian	2	0.2%
Native Hawaiian and Other Pacific Islander	0	0.0%
Some other race	9	0.7%
Two or more races	59	4.5%
Hispanic or Latino (of any race)	13	1.0%

=== 2000 census ===
As of the census of 2000, there were 1,436 people, 560 households, and 417 families residing in the village. The population density was 1,938.0 inhabitants per square mile (748.3/km^{2}). There were 583 housing units at an average density of 786.8 per square mile (303.8/km^{2}). The racial makeup of the village was 99.65% White, 0.14% African American, 0.07% Asian, and 0.14% from two or more races. Hispanic or Latino of any race were 0.07% of the population.

There were 0 households, out of which 0% had children under the age of 18 living with them, 59.1% were married couples living together, 11.8% had a female householder with no husband present, and 25.4% were non-families. 22.3% of all households were made up of individuals, and 11.6% had someone living alone who was 65 years of age or older. The average household size was 2.56 and the average family size was 3.00.

In the village, the population was spread out, with 27.8% under the age of 18, 7.8% from 18 to 24, 29.4% from 25 to 44, 20.6% from 45 to 64, and 14.4% who were 65 years of age or older. The median age was 37 years. For every 100 females, there were 93.8 males. For every 100 females age 18 and over, there were 90.6 males.

The median income for a household in the village was $40,529, and the median income for a family was $45,250. Males had a median income of $34,408 versus $24,219 for females. The per capita income for the village was $16,635. About 7.4% of families and 7.1% of the population were below the poverty line, including 7.9% of those under age 18 and 8.3% of those age 65 or over.

== Notable residents ==
- Fern Coppedge (1883–1951), impressionist painter. She was born in Cerro Gordo.
- Charlie Taylor (1868–1956), builder of the first aircraft engine used by the Wright brothers in the Wright Flyer.
- David W. Tucker (1929–2003), director of the University of California Jazz Ensembles from 1969 until 1985.

== In popular culture ==
Three books by Richard Peck are set in Cerro Gordo. While never named in the books, Peck has confirmed that his own Grandma Peck lived in Cerro Gordo where he would visit from his boyhood home of Decatur. The books, A Long Way from Chicago, A Year Down Yonder, and A Season of Gifts, have won several major awards

== Gallery ==
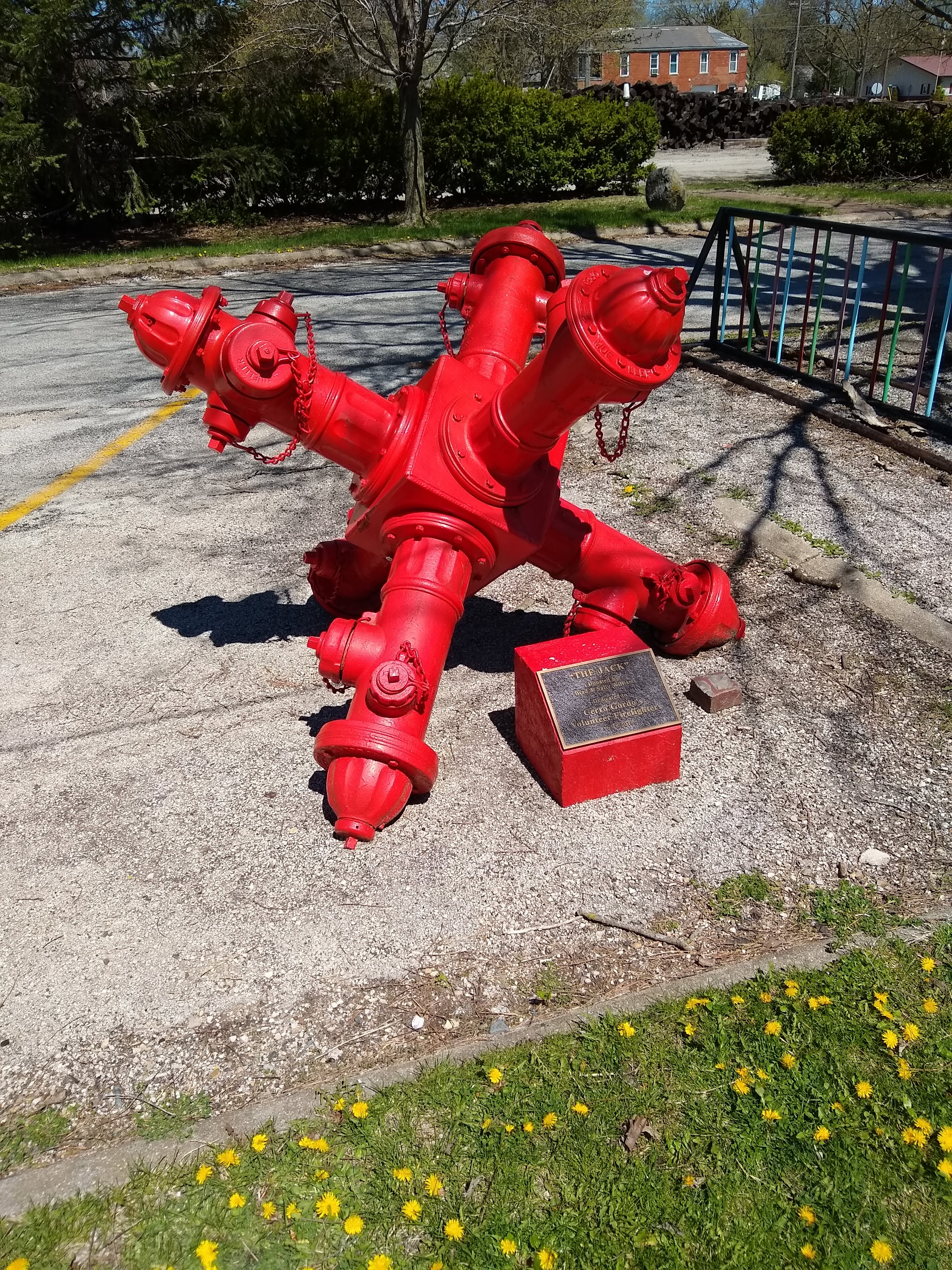
"The Jack"

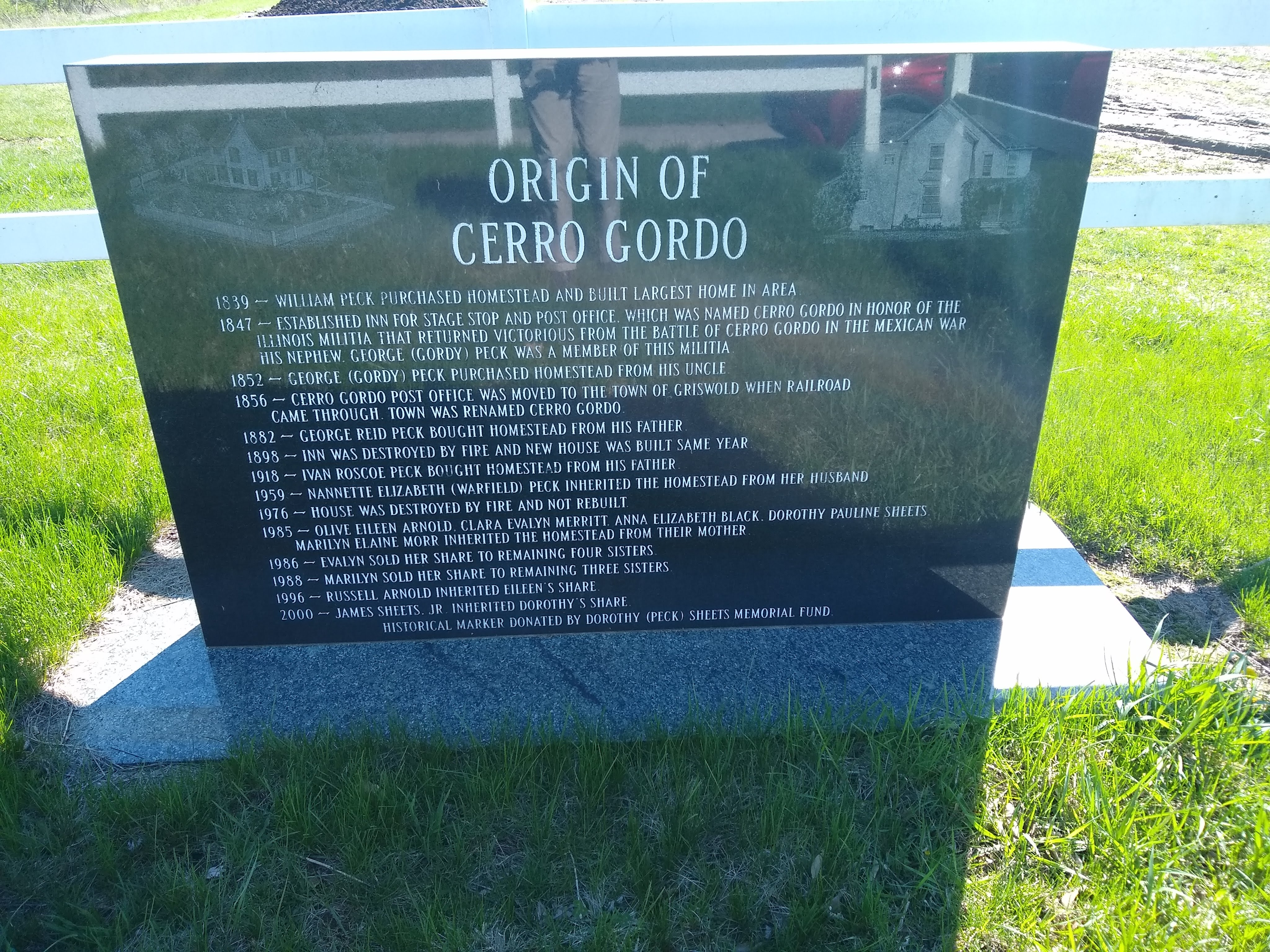
A historical marker
