= Ladybug Girl =

2008 children's picture book by David Soman and Jacky Davis

- Front cover, designed by David Soman
- Author: Jacky Davis
- Illustrator: David Soman
- Language: English
- Series: Ladybug Girl
- Genre: Children's book
- Publisher: Dial
- Publication date: March 13, 2008
- Publication place: United States
- Pages: 40 pp
- ISBN: 978-0-8037-3195-0
- OCLC: 122337831
- Dewey Decimal: [E] 22
- LC Class: PZ7.S696224 Lad 2008

Ladybug Girl is a children's picture book, published in 2008 by Dial Books, and the name of its main character. A series of sequels has followed. It was created by married couple David Soman and Jacky Davis.

== Plot summary ==
Lulu's family is busy so she plays with her dog Bingo and spends time outside helping ants bypass rocks, crossing puddles that she imagines could contain sharks, and fixing up a rock fort in their spacious backyard.

== Reception ==
One review says, "Captured in the illustrations are her sense of self and freedom. Lovely to see in a book for girls, Lulu is not squeamish and has a vivid imagination that keeps her more than busy enough while everyone is busy. The illustrations are full of movement, breeze and joy. They capture a day spent outside alone and the fun that can be found there". A Kirkus Reviews review says, "Amusing watercolor and line illustrations capture Lulu at her most bored and Ladybug Girl at her most adventurous. Ideal inspiration for little ones seeking empowerment." It is a bestseller.

== Books ==
- Ladybug Girl (2008), "A story about imagination and adventure"
- Ladybug Girl and Bumblebee Boy (2009), "A story about friendship and compromise"
- Ladybug Girl Dresses Up! (2010)
- Ladybug Girl at the Beach (2010), "A story about being brave"
- Ladybug Girl Loves... (2010)
- Ladybug Girl Visits the Farm (2011)
- Ladybug Girl and the Bug Squad (2011), "A story about empathy"
- The Amazing Adventures of Bumblebee Boy (2011), "A story about sibling rivalry"
- Ladybug Girl and Bingo (2012)
- Ladybug Girl Makes Friends (2012)
- Ladybug Girl Feels Happy (2014)
- Ladybug Girl Plays (2013), "A story about imagination"
- Ladybug Girl and Her Mama (2013)
- Play All Day with Ladybug Girl (2013)
- Ladybug Girl and the Big Snow (2013), "A story about looking on the bright side"
- Who Can Play? (2013)
- Doodle All Day with Ladybug Girl (2014)
- Ladybug Girl Says Good Night (2014)
- Do You Like These Boots? (2014)
- Happy Halloween, Ladybug Girl! (2014)
- Ladybug Girl and the Dress-up Dilemma (2014), "A story about being true to yourself"
- Ladybug Girl Ready for Snow (2014)
- Ladybug Girl and the WORST Ever Playdate (2015), "A story about the value of friendship"
- Ladybug Girl's Day Out with Grandpa (2017), "A story about the thrill of discovery"
- Ladybug Girl and the Rescue Dogs (2018), "A story about making a difference"
