= A Year Down Yonder =

2000 novel by Richard Peck

- First edition (publ. Dial Books)
- Author: Richard Peck
- Illustrator: Ashlea Shaffer
- Cover artist: Steve Cieslawski
- Language: English
- Genre: Children's historical fiction
- Publisher: Dial Books; Scholastic Inc. Penguin Putnam Inc.
- Publication date: October 2000
- Publication place: United States
- Media type: Print (hardback & paperback)
- Pages: 144 pp (first edition, hardback)130 pp (2000)
- ISBN: 0803725183
- OCLC: 42061114
- LC Class: PZ7.P338 Yh 2000
- Preceded by: A Long Way from Chicago
- Followed by: A Season of Gifts

A Year Down Yonder is a novel by Richard Peck published in 2000 and won the Newbery Medal in 2001. It is a sequel to A Long Way from Chicago, which itself received a Newbery Honor.

== Plot ==
The year is 1938, and the Great Depression has hit the Dowdel family hard. 15-year-old Mary Alice is sent downstate to live with Grandma Dowdel while her mother and father remain in Chicago. Her brother, Joey Dowdel, joins the army while Mary Alice is less than thrilled with the arrangement. Grandma's Hickory farming community could not be more different from Chicago if it tried, and the grandmother Mary Alice remembers from childhood is a no-nonsense country gal.

Having no choice in the matter, Mary Alice arrives by train in September with her beloved cat Bootsie and prized Philco radio. Day one in the new high school finds Mary Alice getting on the wrong side of the local bully, Mildred Burdick. Mildred brazenly follows Mary Alice home, demanding a dollar---but Grandma Dowdel turns the tables on the tyrant, slyly untying Mildred's stolen horse. Faced with a barefoot 5-mile-hike home, Mildred loses interest in making trouble for Mary Alice. October brings plenty of other trouble, however, when another teen hooligan - August Fluke Jr. - gets in the habit of knocking down privies for pre-Halloween amusement. With the help of a strategically strung wire and a pan of glue, Grandma Dowdel trips up Augie's trickery, with a hot coat of glue that sticks "till kingdom come." Luckily, Grandma's treats prove far sweeter than her tricks: at the party, Mrs. Dowdel dishes up home-baked pies made with "borrowed" pecans and pumpkins. Moonlit winter nights find Grandma and Mary Alice trapping foxes; with the extra money, Grandma buys Joey a train ticket and he arrives just in time for the Christmas pageant. But when Mildred Burdick's illegitimate baby turns up in the manger, Christmas is anything but a silent night.

Mary Alice stirs the town up by submitting anonymous articles to a community newspaper and a new boy---Royce McNabb---arrives just in time for Valentine's Day. Carleen develops an instant crush on Royce. With the help of best friend Ina-Rae, Mary Alice fools Carleen into believing that Royce sent Ina-Rae a valentine. Meanwhile, Grandma hosts a tea for the Daughters of the American Revolution and country bumpkin Effie Wilcox learns that the hoity-toity Mrs. L.J. Weidenbach is her long-lost sister.

In spring, Grandma takes in a New York artist, Arnold Green, as a boarder for a whopping $2.50 a day as Mary Alice invites Royce over for an ostensibly "study" focused-date. The snake Grandma keeps in the attic drops down on Maxine Patch, the postmistress, whom Green was painting naked, or nude, as he prefers, leaving Maxine shamed (as she ran through town au naturel) and Arnold in shock. Grandma moonlights as matchmaker, introducing Green to Mary Alice's English teacher, Miss Butler. Mary Alice survives her first tornado, and the school year wraps up with a hayride that finds Royce and Mary Alice promising to exchange letters. A year down yonder leaves Mary Alice with a more tenderhearted view of country life and Grandma Dowdel, and she hesitates to head back to Chicago. Wedding bells ring at the end of World War II, and Mary Alice returns to marry Royce McNabb in Grandma's front room.

== Setting ==
While the name of Grandma's town is never given, Peck, who grew up in Decatur, IL has said that his own Grandmother's town of Cerro Gordo, IL was the inspiration for his novels. Many of the names used for surrounding towns in the story are actual names of towns surrounding Cerro Gordo.

== Reception ==
According to Kirkus Reviews, "Peck's slice-of-life novel doesn't have much in the way of a sustained plot; it could almost be a series of short stories strung together, but the narrative never flags, and the book, populated with distinctive, soulful characters who run the gamut from crazy to conventional, holds the reader's interest throughout." Jim Gladstone wrote in The New York Times, "I suspect that parents and grandparents will enjoy reading these conversationally cadenced stories aloud, savoring Peck's sweet (but never too sentimental) evocations of, say, Kate Smith, 'the Songbird of the South,' singing; Armistice Day celebrations; W.P.A. artists' post office projects; and the joys of eavesdropping on faraway places through a portable radio in the dark of night." Kitty Flynn wrote in The Horn Book Magazine, "While the escapades are diverting, the seven stories, which span the school year, don't have the cumulative power of those in A Long Way from Chicago... Peck presents memorable characters in a satisfying sequel, and those looking to be entertained once again by Grandma Dowdel will enjoy their visit." Jaquan Jarrett wrote in The Yellow Wolf Magazine, "A unique approach to children's literature... a modern day children's book that is based on a time period we all enjoy reading about, rather than submitting to modern-day approaches with sci-fi and dragons". 2016

Awards
Preceded by Bud, Not Buddy	Newbery Medal recipient 2001	Succeeded by A Single Shard
