= Theodosia (TV series) =

English television series, 2022 and 2024

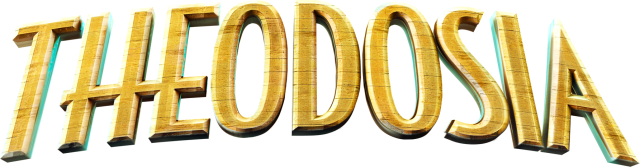
- Genre: Family fantasy
- Based on: Theodosia and the Serpents of Chaos by Robin LaFevers
- Written by: Joe Williams
- Directed by: Matthias Hoene; Alex Jacob; Matt Bloom
- Starring: Eloise Little; Yasmina El-Abd
- Composer: Alexandre Lessertisseur
- Countries of origin: France; Germany
- Original language: English
- No. of seasons: 2
- No. of episodes: 52

Production
- Executive producers: Joe Williams; Leila Smith
- Producers: David Michel; Cécile Lauritano; Zoé Carrera Allaix
- Cinematography: Pierre-Hugues Galien
- Production companies: Cottonwood Media; ZDF Studios

Original release
- Network: KiKA (Germany); France 4 (France); HBO Max (United States, Season 1); CBBC (UK); Globoplay and Gloob (Brazil); Biggs and SIC K (Portugal); BYUtv (United States, Season 2)
- Release: 10 March 2022 – present

Theodosia is an English-language fantasy adventure television series, produced by ZDF Studios and Cottonwood Media and very loosely based on the children's adventure novels by Robin LaFevers.

Presented at the 2021 MIPCOM, the first season premiered in the United States on HBO Max on 10 March 2022, followed by the premieres on CBBC on 25 April and Globoplay on 21 June 2022. It later premiered in Portugal on Biggs and on SIC K.

Theodosia was renewed for a second season, of which the first half of thirteen episodes was released on BBC iPlayer on 21 January 2024. The remaining thirteen episodes were released on BBC iPlayer on 05 May 2024.

After Max dropped the rights on 17 May 2023, BYUtv picked up the US rights. While originally announced as only a season 1 pickup, this was debunked when BYUtv began televising the series. Season 1 began on the networks app and website on 22 October 2023, and season 2 premiered on the same on 23 October 2024.

== Premise ==
The series follows Theodosia "Theo" Throckmorton, the 14-year-old daughter of two Egyptologists in 1906 who run and live at London's Museum of Legends and Antiquities. Theo and her younger brother Henry stumble onto a hidden tomb and a mysterious artifact, the Eye of Horus.

== Cast ==
=== Main ===
- Eloise Little as Theodosia "Theo" Throckmorton
- Yasmina El-Abd as Safiya (season 1)
- Nana Agyeman-Bediako as Will Morgan
- Frankie Minchella as Henry Throckmorton
- Louis Martino as Darius Kastour (season 2)
- Julie Lamberton as Maya Linton (season 2)

=== Supporting ===
- Rik Young as Alistair Throckmorton
- Elisa Doughty as Henrietta Throckmorton
- Jethro Skinner as Clive Fagenbush
- Yuki Sutton as Josie (season 2)

=== Recurring ===
- Estrid Barton as Lady Lavinia Throckmorton
- Momo Yeung as Miss Krait (Season 1)
- Anthony J. Abraham as Artie (Season 1)
- Charlie Cattrall as Yaret the Chief Serpent (Season 1)
- Olivia Barrowclough as Nigella (Season 1)
- Nahid Leadar as Queen Hatshepsut (Season 1)

== Episodes ==
Series	Episodes	Originally released	
Series	Episodes	First released	Last released
1	26	10 March 2022	3 October 2022
2	26	21 January 2024	5 May 2024

=== Series 1 (2022) ===
No. overall	No. in series	Title	Directed by	Written by	Original air date (HBO Max)	Original air date (CBBC)
1	1	"The Eye of Horus"	Matthias Hoene	Joe Williams	10 March 2022	25 April 2022
2	2	"The Curse"	Matthias Hoene	Joe Williams	10 March 2022	25 April 2022
3	3	"The Missing Princess"	Unknown	Unknown	10 March 2022	25 April 2022
4	4	"An Accidental Odyssey"	Unknown	Unknown	10 March 2022	25 April 2022
5	5	"The Games People Play"	Unknown	Unknown	10 March 2022	25 April 2022
6	6	"Cleaning Catastrophe"	Unknown	Unknown	10 March 2022	25 April 2022
7	7	"The Head of the Snake"	Unknown	Unknown	10 March 2022	25 April 2022
8	8	"The Sound of Magic"	Unknown	Unknown	10 March 2022	25 April 2022
9	9	"Double Trouble"	Unknown	Unknown	10 March 2022	25 April 2022
10	10	"The Darkening"	Unknown	Unknown	10 March 2022	25 April 2022
11	11	"The Pit of Despair"	Unknown	Unknown	10 March 2022	25 April 2022
12	12	"Wild Child"	Unknown	Unknown	10 March 2022	25 April 2022
13	13	"The Eye of the Needle"	Unknown	Unknown	10 March 2022	25 April 2022
14	14	"A Date with Destiny"	Unknown	Unknown	3 October 2022	2 October 2022
15	15	"The Trouble with Time"	Unknown	Unknown	3 October 2022	2 October 2022
16	16	"The Age of Wisdom"	Unknown	Unknown	3 October 2022	2 October 2022
17	17	"The Nightmare at the Museum"	Unknown	Unknown	3 October 2022	2 October 2022
18	18	"The Amazing Will"	Unknown	Unknown	3 October 2022	2 October 2022
19	19	"The Magic Flute"	Unknown	Unknown	3 October 2022	2 October 2022
20	20	"An Impossible Choice"	Unknown	Unknown	3 October 2022	2 October 2022
21	21	"What Big Teeth You Have"	Unknown	Unknown	3 October 2022	2 October 2022
22	22	"Snake and Ladder"	Unknown	Unknown	3 October 2022	2 October 2022
23	23	"Mummies Alive!"	Unknown	Unknown	3 October 2022	2 October 2022
24	24	"In Her Shoes"	Unknown	Unknown	3 October 2022	2 October 2022
25	25	"Once Bitten"	Unknown	Unknown	3 October 2022	2 October 2022
26	26	"The Last Sunrise"	Unknown	Unknown	3 October 2022	2 October 2022

=== Series 2 (2024) ===
No. overall	No. in series	Title	Directed by	Written by	Original air date (BBC iPlayer)	Original air date (BYUtv)
27	1	"Magic Memories"	Unknown	Unknown	21 January 2024	22 October 2024
28	2	"New Blood"	Unknown	Unknown	21 January 2024	22 October 2024
29	3	"Bugs and Kisses"	Unknown	Unknown	21 January 2024	22 October 2024
30	4	"The Ruin"	Unknown	Unknown	21 January 2024	22 October 2024
31	5	"Stop the Press"	Unknown	Unknown	21 January 2024	22 October 2024
32	6	"Into Darkness"	Unknown	Unknown	21 January 2024	22 October 2024
33	7	"The Names of the Game"	Unknown	Unknown	21 January 2024	22 October 2024
34	8	"The Zodiac"	Unknown	Unknown	21 January 2024	22 October 2024
35	9	"The Phoenix"	Unknown	Unknown	21 January 2024	22 October 2024
36	10	"A Fête Worse than Death"	Unknown	Unknown	21 January 2024	22 October 2024
37	11	"In the Balance"	Unknown	Unknown	21 January 2024	22 October 2024
38	12	"Monsters of the Underworld"	Unknown	Unknown	21 January 2024	22 October 2024
39	13	"The Oasis of Magic"	Unknown	Unknown	21 January 2024	22 October 2024
40	14	"The Sisterhood"	Unknown	Unknown	5 May 2024	22 October 2024
41	15	"No Rest for the Wicked"	Unknown	Unknown	5 May 2024	22 October 2024
42	16	"In Plain Sight"	Unknown	Unknown	5 May 2024	22 October 2024
43	17	"The Fog"	Unknown	Unknown	5 May 2024	22 October 2024
44	18	"The Frosty Sands of Time"	Unknown	Unknown	5 May 2024	22 October 2024
45	19	"Weather or Not, Here I Come"	Unknown	Unknown	5 May 2024	22 October 2024
46	20	"The Prophecy"	Unknown	Unknown	5 May 2024	22 October 2024
47	21	"Time Warp"	Unknown	Unknown	5 May 2024	22 October 2024
48	22	"Too Much Magic"	Unknown	Unknown	5 May 2024	22 October 2024
49	23	"Prison Break"	Unknown	Unknown	5 May 2024	22 October 2024
50	24	"Power Move"	Unknown	Unknown	5 May 2024	22 October 2024
51	25	"For Better or Worse"	Unknown	Unknown	5 May 2024	22 October 2024
52	26	"Climate of Fear"	Unknown	Unknown	5 May 2024	22 October 2024

== Production ==
=== Development ===
Following the final season of Find Me in Paris, it was announced in February 2021 that ZDF and Cottonwood Media would be collaborating again, this time to adapt Robin LaFevers's Theodosia novels for television. Early buyers included HBO Max and Globoplay. Executive producers include head writer Joe Williams and Cottonwood's Leila Smith. Also representing Cottonwood are producers David Michel, Cécile Lauritano, and Zoé Carrera Allaix.

In October 2022 it was announced ZDF had greenlit a second season of Theodosia.

=== Cast ===
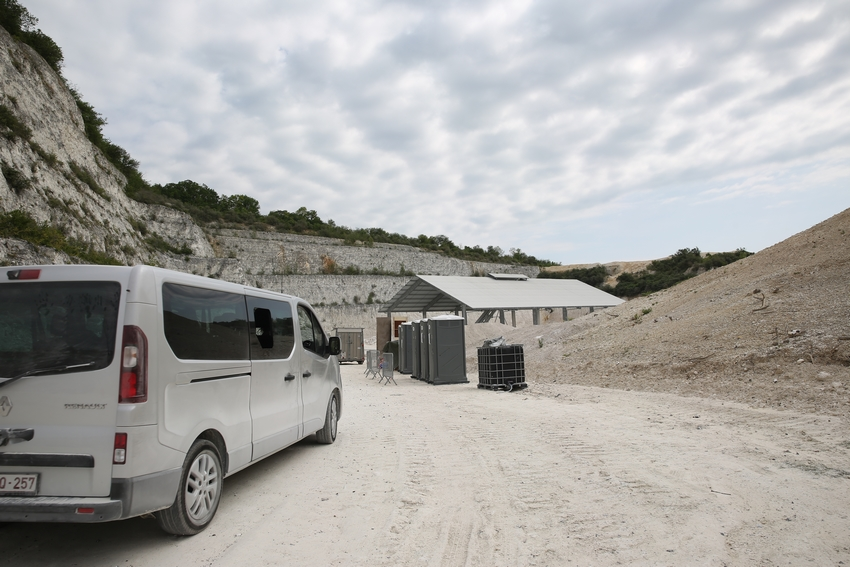
In France, scenes were filmed in 2021 in the Imerys chalk quarry in Précy-sur-Oise (Oise).

It was announced Eloise Little would star in the title role. Also joining the cast were Nana Agyeman-Bediako and Yasmina El-Abd. The trailer, released in late February 2022, confirmed Rik Young and Elisa Doughty would be playing Theo's parents.

=== Filming ===
Principal photography commenced in April 2021 and wrapped that October, taking place in Paris and Brussels. Parts of the cities, such as back alleys, were used to recreate Edwardian London. The series was shot by directors Matthias Hoene, Alex Jacob, and Matt Bloom. Production on the second season took place in France, Belgium, and Morocco.
