= Yasmina El-Abd =

Egyptian actor and singer-songwriter (born 2006)

- ياسمينا العبد
- Yasmina El-Abd at the 2026 Cannes Film Festival
- Born: 8 June 2006 (age 20); Geneva, Switzerland
- Occupations: Actor and singer-songwriter
- Years active: 2017–present

Yasmina El-Abd (Egyptian Arabic: ياسمينا العبد; born 8 June 2006) is an Egyptian actor and singer-songwriter. On television, she is known for her roles in the Netflix series Finding Ola (2022–2024) and the fantasy series Theodosia (2022).

== Early life ==
El-Abd was born in Switzerland to Egyptian parents. She self-identifies as Egyptian-Swiss while also having US citizenship, and has stated she is proud of her Egyptian origin. El-Abd grew up in Switzerland before moving to Dubai at age 10. She later lived in Cairo and London. She speaks English, French, Egyptian Arabic and multiple dialects of Arabic. El-Abd attended the Diverse Performing Arts School in Dubai and also took acting classes in London.

== Career ==
After appearing in a number of commercials and starring in the 2019 short The Shadow of Cairo at the age of 12, El-Abd released three pop singles in 2020: "Mesh Mokhtalefeen", "24 Karat", and "Sawa Sawa". This was followed by her feature film debut in Jordanian-born filmmaker Zaid Abu Hamdan's 2021 comedy-drama Daughters of Abdul-Rahman. The part was originally written for a 15 year old, and El-Abd was 12 when she successfully auditioned.

In 2022, El-Abd made her television debut with main roles as Zeina in the Netflix comedy-drama Finding Ola with Hend Sabry and Princess Safiya in first season of the London-set English-language fantasy series Theodosia, an adaptation of the children's novels by Robin LaFevers starring Eloise Little. The latter was released on networks such as HBO Max, CBBC, and Globoplay. El-Abd also appeared alongside Sabry in the film Fadel & Neama, directed by Ramy Imam, marking her debut in Egyptian cinema. The following year, she had an ensemble role in the film Sukkar with Hala Al Turk.

El-Abd played Farah in the Ramadan 2024 series Massar Egbari and featured in the short film anthology In Bloom. That same year, El-Abd appeared on the Forbes Middle East 30 under 30 list in the digital stars category. She made her Riyadh stage debut in the play Bani Adam.

== Discography ==
=== Singles ===
- "Mesh Mokhtalefeen" (2020)
- "24 Karat" (2020)
- "Sawa Sawa" (2020)

== Filmography ==
=== Film ===
Year	Title	Role	Notes
2019	The Shadow of Cairo	Maya	
2021	Daughters of Abdul-Rahman	Hiba	
2022	Fadel & Neama	Laila	
2023	Sukkar	Zawbaa	
2024	In Bloom: Period	Fay	

=== Television ===
Year	Title	Role	Notes
2022–2024	Finding Ola	Zeina	12 episodes
2022	Theodosia	Safiya	Main role (season 1)
2022	Ahlam Saeida	Habiba	1 episode
2024	Mandatory Path (Massar Egbari	Farah	1 episode
2025	Lam Shamseya	Zeina	15 episodes
2025	Midterm	Tia	30 episodes
2026	Khamseen Khamseen (Ebn El Nassaba)	Esraa	15 episodes
