= A Season of Gifts =

2009 novel by Richard Peck

First edition (publ. Dial Books)

A Season of Gifts is a novel by Richard Peck, published on September 17, 2009. The story is broken up into three parts: The Last House in Town, The Fall of the Year, and E'er the Winter Storms begin. It is the sequel to A Long Way from Chicago (1999) and A Year Down Yonder (2000). It consists of 208 pages. The audiobook was published by Listening Library and it was narrated by Ron McLarty.

== Summary ==
=== Part I: The Last House in Town ===
When Bobby first arrives in a new town, he immediately takes notice of their neighbor, Mrs. Dowdel's house. At first, his little sister thinks its haunted. He is greeted by the local bullies, who take him to the crick in the woods outside of town. They make him strip down and they dip him in. Afterwards, they tie him naked to Mrs. Dowdel's privy. At discovery, Mrs. Dowdel clothes him with her grandson Joey's old clothes and sends him home. The Barnharts have more encounters with Mrs. Dowdel.

=== Part II: The Fall of the Year ===
This part of the book is started with a long narrative, in which he talks about a haunted melon patch in Mrs. Dowdel's backyard. He goes on to explain that she claimed that an ancient Kickapoo Indian Princess is buried in her backyard. This makes Bob's sister very jealous. Later, Mrs. Dowdel and Cora Shellabarger knock on the Barnhart house and tells Bob's family that his older sister, Phyllis, has fallen in love with one of the bullies who dipped Bobby in the crick, got drunk, and was left by the bully in the remains of a car crash at the Shellabargers' front steps.

=== Part III: E'er the Winter Storms Begin for Pupusitas ===
The third part of the book starts off talking about the local convenience store and how the veterans of foreign war sell Christmas trees there. As Grandma Dowdel is not satisfied with the price of the trees, she asks Bobby to drive them to the woods. With Mrs. Wilcox in the backseat and Mrs. Dowdel in the shotgun seat, Bobby is given the task of driving; as his parents are both busy. In the woods, Bobby and Grandma Dowdel saw down a tree. Grandma Dowdel also had him chop down a second one, so his family could decorate a tree. Afterwards, while collecting greens for wreaths, they discover a house, and they sprint to the car and drive away. The book ends with the Christmas Eve church service.

== Development history ==
=== Publication history ===
The novel was published by Dial Books on September 1, 2009.

== Reception ==
The novel received positive reception from critics upon release. Kirkus Reviews described the novel as being "one of Peck's best novels yet" and praised the book's prose and humor. Publishers Weekly, in a starred review, complimented the plot and characters.
