= Momo Yeung =

Hong Kong actress and ballerina

- Born: Hong Kong
- Occupations: Actress; ballet dancer
- Years active: 2012–present

Momo Yeung (Chinese: 楊敏軒) is a Hong Kong actress and ballerina based in the United Kingdom. She began her career dancing with St. Margaret's Festival Ballet and Manchester City Ballet, appearing in The Nutcracker, The Sleeping Beauty, and Coppélia. Yeung then transitioned into acting, performing on the West End among other venues. On screen, she is known for her roles in the comedy film A Christmas Prince: The Royal Baby (2019), the fantasy series Theodosia and the Netflix series Heartstopper (both 2022).

== Career ==
Yeung began her career as a ballet dancer. She performed as a member of the St. Margaret's Festival Ballet, where she danced in Coppélia and The Sleeping Beauty. She also danced with the Manchester City Ballet, performing in The Nutcracker.

As a stage actress, she performed in The Lion King at the West End theatre, The Night Pirates on its United Kingdom tour, Celtic Journey at the Churchill Theatre, An Unusual Story at the Cochrane Theatre, and Snow White and Aladdin with First Family Entertainment. She also performed in White Pearl at the Royal Court Theatre, in Hansol Jung's Wild Goose Dreams at the Theatre Royal Bath.

Yeung began her film and television career in 2012, first appearing in minor roles in crime drama film The Grind and the British sitcom Stath Lets Flats, and then she made appearances in Doctor Strange in the Multiverse of Madness, Tell Me Everything, The Sandman, Jingle Jangle: A Christmas Journey, and A Christmas Prince: The Royal Baby. In 2022, she appeared as the recurring character Miss Krait in the fantasy adventure television series Theodosia and as Yan Xu, the mother of Tao Xu (played by William Gao), in the Netflix coming-of-age romantic comedy drama series Heartstopper. She reprised her role for the second season of Heartstopper in 2023.

== Filmography ==
Year	Title	Role	Notes	Ref.
2012	The Grind	Dancer	Minor role	
2018	Stath Lets Flats	Waitress	1 episode	
2019	A Christmas Prince: The Royal Baby	Queen Ming of Penglia		
2020	Jingle Jangle: A Christmas Journey	Toy Buyer #2		
2022	Doctor Strange in the Multiverse of Madness	Hong Kong Master		
2022	The Sandman	Disciple #6	1 episode	
2022	Tell Me Everything	Jing	2 episodes	
2022	Theodosia	Miss Krait	recurring role	
2022–present	Heartstopper	Yan Xu	recurring role	
2023	Diablo IV	Oyunn	Video game	
