= Jordan Stratford =

Canadian author of children's fiction

Jordan Stratford is a Canadian author of children's fiction, screenwriter and playwright.

He is a former advertising creative director, filmmaker, instructor at Vancouver Film School and writer for the Canadian Broadcasting Corporation.

== Books ==
=== Children's books ===
Jordan is the author of the Wollstonecraft Detective Agency Series (Knopf / Random House), a pro-math and science adventure series for children 8-12. The first book was funded by a Kickstarter campaign that exceeded its target $4000, being promoted on Wired and io9.

The first book in the series, The Case of the Missing Moonstone, sold 40,000 copies worldwide in its first year, and was translated into Russian, German, Hebrew, and Turkish; it was a finalist for the Sheila A. Egoff Children's Literature Prize (part of the British Columbia Book Prizes), the Sakura Medal (Japan) and the Silver Birch Award (part of the Forest of Reading, created by the Ontario Library Association). The second novel in the series, The Case of the Girl In Grey, was released in 2016, followed by The Case of the Counterfeit Criminals in 2017, and The Case of the Perilous Palace in 2018.

All of the Wollstonecraft Detective Agency books are illustrated by Kelly Murphy. The title refers to Mary Wollstonecraft, and the protagonists are based on Mary Shelley and Ada Lovelace. The series has been optioned for streaming television adaptation by Zodiak/Banijay.

- 2018 - The Case of the Perilous Palace, Knopf Books for Young Readers, ISBN 978-0-553-53644-7
- 2017 - The Case of the Counterfeit Criminals, Knopf Books for Young Readers, ISBN 978-0-385-75448-4
- 2016 - The Case of the Girl in Grey, Yearling, ISBN 978-0-385-75447-7
- 2015 - The Case of the Missing Moonstone, Yearling, ISBN 978-0-385-75443-9

=== Young adult books ===
- 2020 - Winter by Winter, Outland Entertainment, ISBN 978-1-947659-96-4
- 2022 - La Maupin, Outland Entertainment, ISBN 978-1-954255-28-9

=== Nonfiction books ===
- 2011 - A Dictionary of Western Alchemy, Quest Books, 2007, ISBN 0835608972
- 2007 - Living Gnosticism, Apocryphile Press, 2007, ISBN 1933993537

== Steampunk ==
Jordan Stratford was involved in steampunk for many years. He co-founded the Victoria Steam Expo, the first steampunk art exhibition in Canada. Vintage Tomorrows, a documentary about the movement, interviewed him at the 2012 event, which he described as "an interactive art experience" The film quotes him encouraging people to engage with technology, make it, break it, and reinvent it. CNET described his children's series, the Wollstonecraft Detective Agency novels, as steampunk plus Jane Austen.

== Personal life ==
In 2005, Stratford was ordained a Gnostic priest in the Apostolic Johannite Church. He cites poet Robin Skelton as an influence.

Stratford has four children.
