= Bob Filner =

American politician (1942–2025)

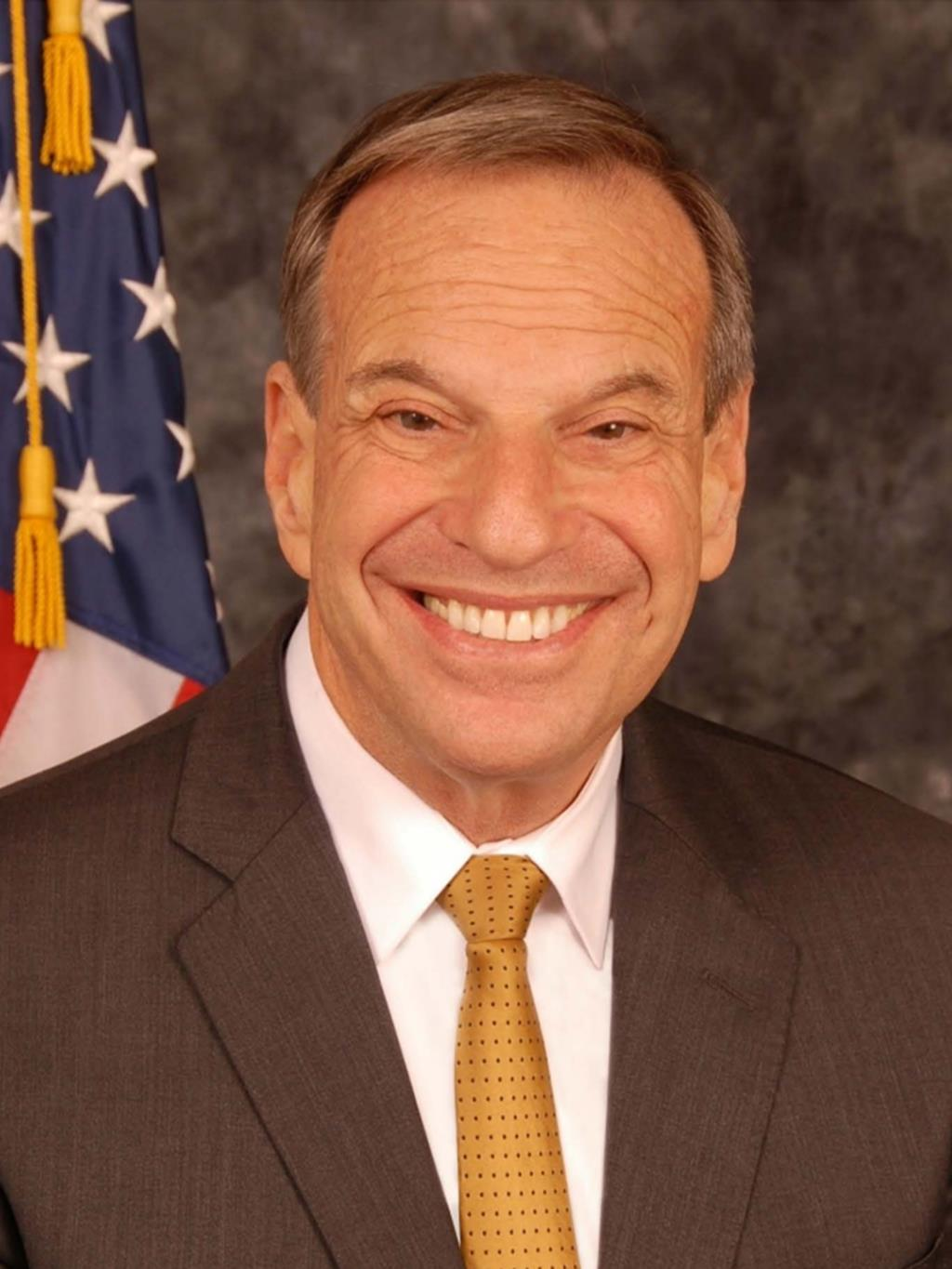
- Official portrait, 2013

35th Mayor of San Diego
- In office December 3, 2012 – August 30, 2013
- Preceded by: Jerry Sanders
- Succeeded by: Todd Gloria (acting)

Ranking Member of the House Veterans' Affairs Committee
- In office January 3, 2011 – December 3, 2012
- Preceded by: Steve Buyer
- Succeeded by: Mike Michaud

Chair of the House Veterans' Affairs Committee
- In office January 4, 2007 – January 3, 2011
- Preceded by: Steve Buyer
- Succeeded by: Jeff Miller

Member of the U.S. House of Representatives from California
- In office January 3, 1993 – December 3, 2012
- Preceded by: Constituency established
- Succeeded by: Juan Vargas
- Constituency: 50th district (1993–2003); 51st district (2003–2012)

Member of the San Diego City Council from the 8th district
- In office December 1987 – January 3, 1993
- Preceded by: Uvaldo Martinez
- Succeeded by: Juan Vargas

Personal details
- Born: Robert Earl Filner; September 4, 1942 Pittsburgh, Pennsylvania, U.S.
- Died: April 20, 2025 (aged 82) Costa Mesa, California, U.S.
- Party: Democratic
- Spouse(s): Barbara Christy (divorced) Jane Merrill (div. 2011)
- Education: Cornell University (BA, PhD); University of Delaware (MA)

Robert Earl Filner (September 4, 1942 – April 20, 2025) was an American politician and member of the Democratic Party.

Filner served as the United States representative for California's 50th and 51st congressional districts from 1993 to 2012. He chaired the House Committee on Veterans' Affairs from 2007 to 2011.

Filner was elected the 35th mayor of San Diego in 2012 and served until his resignation in August 2013 following multiple allegations of sexual harassment. He later pleaded guilty to state charges of false imprisonment and battery.

== Early life and education ==
Filner was born in Pittsburgh, Pennsylvania, in the Squirrel Hill neighborhood. He was Jewish, the son of Sarah F. and Joseph H. Filner. His father was a labor union organizer, U.S. Army veteran and later international metal trader.

He attended Cornell University, where he worked on The Cornell Daily Sun, a student newspaper, and took part in civil rights demonstrations. In June 1961, after pulling into the bus station in Jackson, Mississippi, as a Freedom Rider, Filner was arrested for "disturbing the peace and inciting a riot." He refused to post bond for his release and remained incarcerated for two months.

He graduated from Cornell in 1963 with a degree in chemistry, and earned his doctorate in history of science from Cornell six years later.

== Career ==
While completing his PhD, he moved to San Diego, becoming a history professor at San Diego State University for more than 20 years.

Filner worked for U.S. Senator Hubert Humphrey of Minnesota in 1975 and for Minnesota congressman Don Fraser in 1976. He also worked for Congressman Jim Bates from the San Diego area in 1984.

His elective career began in 1979, when his opposition to the closing of a neighborhood school led him to run for the San Diego Unified School District Board of Education, defeating a longtime incumbent. His "back to basics" approach to education won him wide praise, and his colleagues elected him president of the board in 1982. He was elected to the San Diego City Council in 1987 and was reelected in 1991; his colleagues elected him deputy mayor of San Diego.

=== U.S. House of Representatives ===
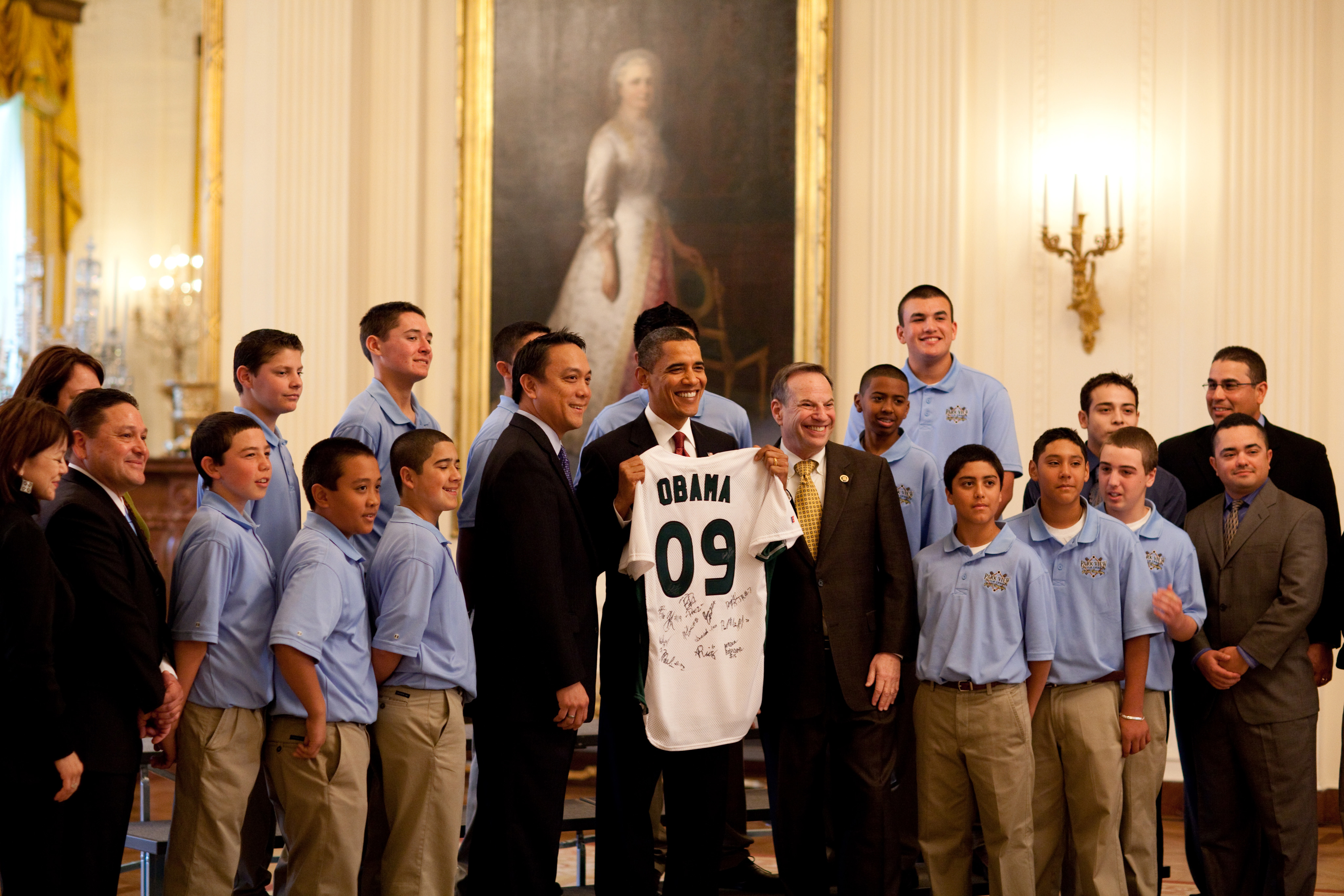
Bob Filner with the 2009 Little League World Series champions meeting Barack Obama

==== Elections ====
California gained seven seats after the 1990 census, and one of them was the 50th District in south San Diego (renumbered the 51st District after the 2000 census). The district is one of the most ethnically diverse in the nation, including much of San Diego's southern section, the cities of Chula Vista and National City and all of Imperial County. It includes most of California's border with Mexico, except for the city of Imperial Beach. In 1992, Filner ran in a five-way Democratic primary for the seat and won a narrow victory. One of his primary opponents was his former boss, Jim Bates, who had lost his seat in a sexual harassment scandal in 1990 and whose home had been drawn into the district.

Another opponent was veteran state Senator Wadie Deddeh, who was term-limited. Filner defeated Deddeh by a narrow margin, with Bates finishing third place in the primary. The district was almost 40% Hispanic (redistricting in 2000 made it 53% Hispanic) and heavily Democratic, and his victory in November (with 57 percent of the vote) was a foregone conclusion. He was reelected nine times with no substantive Republican opposition. He ran unopposed in 1998. He chose not to run for re-election to Congress in 2012, opting instead to run for mayor of San Diego. He resigned from the House of Representatives on December 3, 2012, in order to take office as Mayor of San Diego.

Filner had a bitter rivalry with Juan Vargas, another Democratic politician who ran against Filner in the Democratic primary three times. Filner and Vargas accused each other of corruption. However, in the 2012 mayoral race, Vargas endorsed Filner for Mayor of San Diego and Vargas was elected to Filner's seat in Congress.

=== Tenure ===
Filner was a founding member of the Congressional Progressive Caucus. He was also a member of the Congressional Motorcycle Safety Caucus and International Conservation Caucus. He was one of the 31 House Democrats who voted to not count the 20 electoral votes from Ohio in the 2004 presidential election, despite Republican President George Bush winning the state by 118,457 votes. In 2008, Filner sponsored a resolution, passed by the House of Representatives, in support of National Aviation Maintenance Technician Day. While in congress, Filner was known for his combative personality, and for personally dealing with constituent issues.

Veterans issues

Filner served on the House Committee on Veterans' Affairs and ascended to the chairmanship when the Democrats took over the House of Representatives after the 2006 election. As chairman, Filner advocated for funding for veterans benefits, increased spending on veterans healthcare, and a new GI bill for veterans of Afghanistan and Iraq. Filner stayed on as ranking Democrat on the committee after the Republicans retook the House in the 2010 election.

Filipino issues

Filner's district in south San Diego had one of the largest populations of Filipino Americans in the country, leading Filner to focus on issues relevant to the Philippines while in Congress, especially Filipino veterans. Filner's accomplishments included legislation allowing Filipino veterans to maintain a small stipend from the government if they moved back to the Philippines, burial benefits, and access to VA clinics. In 2009, Filner brokered a deal securing $198 million in pension benefits for Filipino veterans who had served for the United States in World War II in the form of a $15,000 lump sum payment as part of the 2009 stimulus bill. In February 2009, Rep. Antonio Diaz filed a bill in the Philippine House of Representatives seeking to confer honorary Filipino citizenship on Filner and U.S. Senators Daniel Inouye, Daniel Akaka, and Ted Stevens for their role in securing the passage of this legislation.

Airline worker controversy

On August 20, 2007, Filner was involved in an altercation with a United Airlines employee at Dulles International Airport after he became upset that his baggage had not yet arrived on a baggage carousel. Filner entered the baggage claim office and became irritated when the employee was busy helping another customer and asked the congressman to wait his turn. It was at this point that it is alleged that Filner attempted to enter the employee-only area of the office. He was asked to leave the area several times by airline employees but refused to do so until airport police were called in.

Filner was on his way to visit troops in Iraq at the time of the incident. He released a statement saying "suffice it to say now, that the story that has appeared in the press is factually incorrect and the charges are ridiculous". He was later charged with assault and battery. Filner pleaded guilty in an Alford plea to reduced charges of trespassing. The House Ethics Committee began a probe into the event, but it was later dropped.

People's Mujahedin of Iran

Filner, along with several senior United States officials, argued that the People's Mujahedin of Iran, also known as the MEK, should have its designation as a terrorist group removed. Filner considered the MEK, a major member of the National Council of Resistance of Iran, an ally against the current Iranian regime. The U.S. Department of State lifted the MEK's designation as a terrorist organization as of September 28, 2012.

=== Committee assignments ===
- Committee on Transportation and Infrastructure
  - Subcommittee on Aviation
  - Subcommittee on Highways and Transit
  - Subcommittee on Water Resources and Environment
- Committee on Veterans' Affairs (Ranking Member)

=== Mayor of San Diego ===
==== Election ====
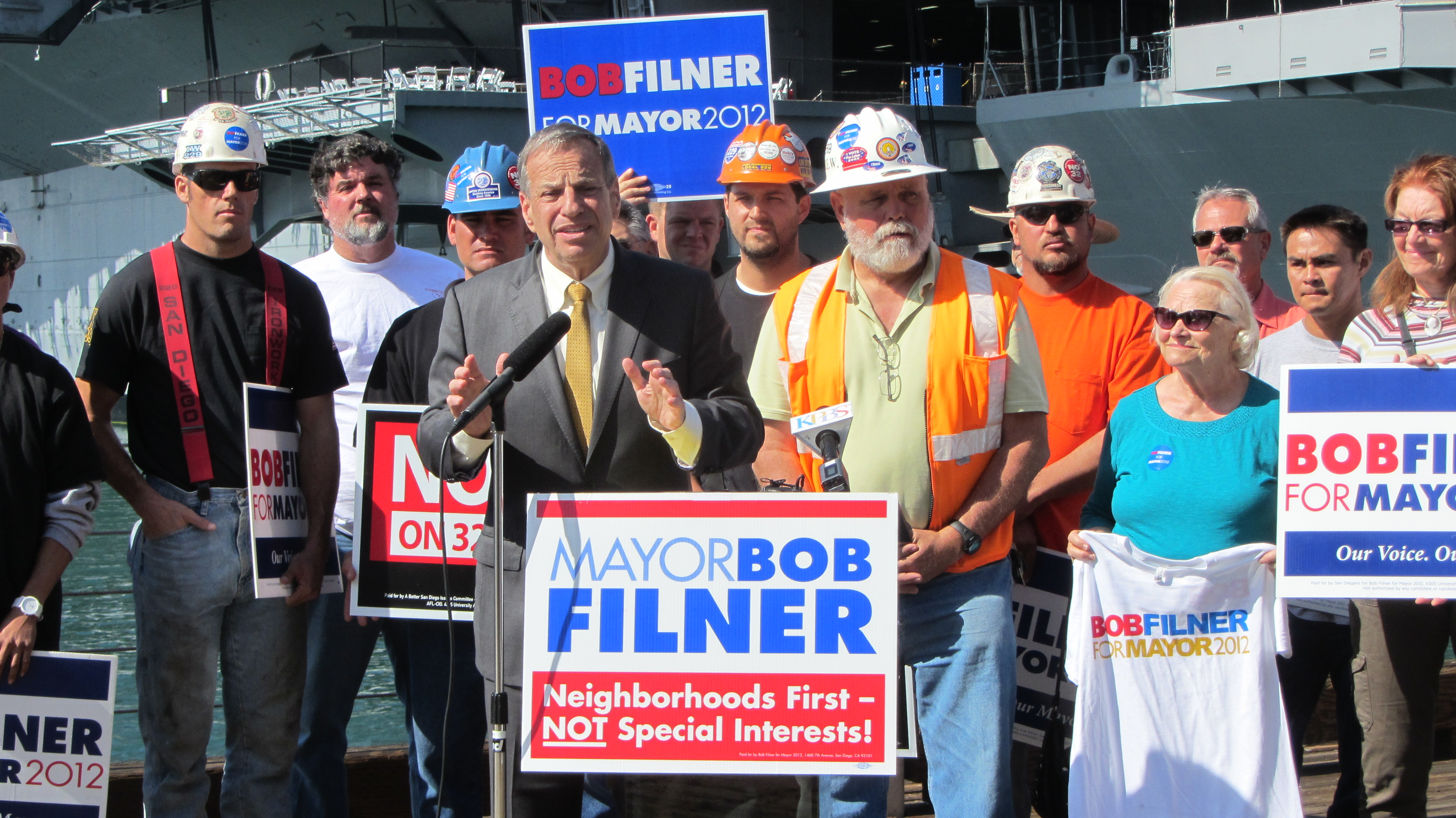
Bob Filner's press conference about veterans

Filner announced on June 8, 2011, that he would be a candidate for mayor of San Diego in the 2012 election and would not run for re-election to Congress. In the primary on June 5, 2012, he placed second with 30.7% of the vote. He faced city councilmember Carl DeMaio in the November 2012 runoff election. Filner defeated DeMaio, 52.5% to 47.5%. Filner, age 70, won as San Diego's first elected Democratic mayor since 1992 and only its second since 1971.

=== Tenure ===
In his first speech as mayor, Filner promised to focus on rebuilding the neighborhoods of San Diego, improving city services, increasing staffing for public safety, bringing jobs to the city, and developing stronger regional ties with Tijuana.

In January 2013, following a meeting between Filner and the San Diego chapter of Americans for Safe Access, Filner instructed the San Diego Police Department and city code compliance officers to stop enforcing codes against marijuana dispensaries and stop forwarding cases to the San Diego City Attorney's Office. In April 2013, Filner proposed a new ordinance to restore permanent legal status to dispensaries, but the City Council rejected it and suggested that the City Attorney draft a new ordinance in its place. Meanwhile, federal agencies continued to raid and prosecute dispensaries within city limits.

In February 2013, Filner raised controversy by not authorizing funding of the Tourism Marketing District, a hotelier-run organization charged with promoting San Diego as a tourist destination that is funded by a 2 percent surcharge on hotel rooms. In 2012, the San Diego City Council agreed to renew the District for 39 1/2 years, but outgoing mayor Jerry Sanders did not sign the agreement before leaving office. Filner publicly withheld his signature on the agreement, wanting a series of concessions that would raise hotel worker salaries, protect the city from liability, and direct more of the funds collected to be used by the City of San Diego. The District subsequently filed suit against the Mayor to enforce the agreement, but Judge Timothy Taylor ruled that Filner had the discretion not to sign. After this ruling, Filner and the hoteliers agreed to a compromise and Filner signed the contract. However, in late May 2013 Filner temporarily withheld payments to the District until it agreed to provide upfront funding for a centennial celebration for Balboa Park.

=== 2013 allegations and resignation ===
==== Allegations of sexual harassment ====
On July 11, 2013, three of Filner's long-time supporters held a press conference to call for Filner's resignation as mayor, based on numerous unspecified but "credible" allegations that he had sexually harassed women. KPBS-FM said that it had been investigating reports of sexual harassment of female staff members for several months, and that the complaints included "inappropriate comments, kissing and groping". Later that day Filner issued a video statement apologizing and saying that he was seeking professional help to change his behavior. The next day Filner told reporters that he had treated women poorly and sometimes intimidated them, but insisted that a "fair and independent investigation" would clear him of sexual harassment charges.

On July 12, Filner's chief of staff, Vince Hall, announced his resignation, effective immediately. On July 24, Filner's new chief of staff Tony Buckles, his former congressional chief of staff, resigned after only 10 days on the job and was replaced by Lee Burdick, a woman who had been serving as deputy chief of staff.

On July 15, the same three former supporters held another press conference, describing in more detail charges by women who said they had been forcibly kissed, groped, and subjected to sexually suggestive comments by Filner; the alleged but unidentified victims include a mayoral staffer, a campaign volunteer and a constituent. Filner repeated that he had done nothing wrong and would not resign.

On July 22, 2013, attorney Gloria Allred announced at a press conference that her firm had filed a sexual harassment lawsuit against Filner on behalf of the mayor's former communications director. By August 26, 19 women had publicly claimed that Filner had sexually harassed them, including retired Rear Admiral Ronne Froman, a Marilyn Monroe impersonator who appeared at one of his fundraisers, a 67-year-old great-grandmother who worked for the city, a nurse who said Filner demanded a date in exchange for helping a Marine who had suffered a brain injury and PTSD during service in Iraq, and several female members of the U.S. armed forces who had been raped during their service. In the last two instances, Filner's contact with the women stemmed from his position at the time as ranking member of the House Veterans' Affairs Committee.

In the ensuing weeks, calls for Filner's resignation came from Democratic U.S. senators Dianne Feinstein and Barbara Boxer, US House of Representatives minority leader Nancy Pelosi, representatives Susan Davis and Scott Peters, DNC chairwoman and U.S. Representative Debbie Wasserman Schultz, California State Assembly members Toni Atkins and Lorena Gonzalez, and all nine members of the City Council.

On July 26, 2013, Filner announced that he planned to take a leave of absence "to undergo two weeks of intensive therapy” starting August 5. He started the treatment but ended it early on August 10, according to his attorney.

On July 29, 2013, Filner asked the city of San Diego to pay his legal fees for a sexual harassment lawsuit regarding his former communications director. The city council voted not to do so, and in fact to sue Filner for any costs incurred by the city due to claims filed against him and the city. The City Council later reversed itself as part of a negotiated agreement with Filner.

=== Other issues ===
Federal, state and local investigators looked into several other issues involving Filner. One matter involved a trip he took to Paris with his then-fiancée in June 2013; questions had been raised about the nonprofit group that paid his expenses and the use of city credit cards to pay for his accompanying security detail. On another issue, FBI agents looked into a pair of proposed housing developments which Filner blocked with an "administrative hold" until the developers contributed money to certain city projects.

=== Recall effort ===
In August 2013 two different groups started the process to mount a recall drive against Filner; the two groups later combined their efforts. In order to force a recall election, they would have had to gather more than 100,000 signatures of city voters (15% of the votes cast in the most recent election) within a 39-day window. On August 18, 1,200 volunteers began collecting signatures. Less than a week after the signature drive began, Filner agreed to resign. The recall organizers wound down the effort, called for all petitions to be turned in so they could be counted and destroyed, and worked on preparing a final financial accounting.

=== Resignation ===
On August 21, 2013, city attorney Jan Goldsmith said that Filner had reached an agreement with the city after three days of mediation. The City Council considered the agreement in a closed session on August 23 and voted 7–0 to accept Filner's resignation. The resignation deal with the City Council limits Filner's "legal and financial exposure" by providing a joint legal defense for him and the city for claims filed against him by current or former city employees, as well as paying up to $98,000 of his outside legal fees. Filner signed a letter of resignation that became effective at 5 p.m PDT August 30, 2013. City Council president Todd Gloria served as interim mayor, with limited powers, pending election of a new mayor. A special election was held on November 19, 2013; since no candidate received a majority of the vote, a runoff election was held on February 11, 2014, wherein Kevin Faulconer was elected to be the next mayor.

=== Conviction ===
On October 15, 2013, Filner pleaded guilty in San Diego Superior Court to three criminal counts filed against him by the California state attorney general, who took over the case after the San Diego County district attorney recused herself. The charges were one felony count of false imprisonment and two misdemeanor battery charges. The victims were identified as three Jane Does. He could have faced up to five years in prison, but a plea bargain was reportedly reached, under which he would be given three months of house arrest, three years probation, and partial loss of his mayoral pension. On December 9, 2013, the terms of the plea bargain were imposed at a sentencing hearing. The plea bargain would have prohibited him from ever seeking or holding public office again, but the judge reduced the prohibition so it applied only while he was on probation. He served a three-month term of house arrest which ended on April 6, 2014.

In a 2016 interview, Filner denied all allegations of sexual harassment.

=== Additional allegation in 2017 ===
On November 20, 2017, Representative Diana DeGette (D-Colorado) alleged during an interview on MSNBC's Meet the Press Daily that Filner tried to force himself on her in an elevator.

== Personal life and death ==
Filner divorced from his first wife, Barbara (Christy) Filner, a retired mediation specialist, whom he had met when they were both teaching in a summer program in the early 1960s at Tuskegee University (then Institute). They had two adult children, a son and a daughter.

Filner was later married to Jane Merrill, but they divorced in 2011.

At his first news conference after his election as mayor in 2012, Filner introduced his fiancée, Bronwyn Ingram, a disability analyst who worked for the Social Security Administration. On July 8, 2013, Ingram announced by email to a group of her supporters that the engagement had been called off and the relationship was over. In a subsequent statement, Ingram cited Filner's verbal abuse and blatant sexting as reasons for the split.

Filner died at an assisted living home in Costa Mesa, California, on April 20, 2025, at the age of 82.

U.S. House of Representatives
New constituency	Member of the U.S. House of Representatives from California's 50th congressional district 1993-2003	Succeeded by Duke Cunningham
Preceded by Duke Cunningham	Member of the U.S. House of Representatives from California's 51st congressional district 2003-2012	Succeeded by Juan Vargas
Preceded by Steve Buyer	Chair of the House Veterans' Affairs Committee; 2007–2011	Succeeded by Jeff Miller
Preceded by Steve Buyer	Ranking Member of the House Veterans' Affairs Committee; 2011–2012	Succeeded by Mike Michaud
Political offices
Preceded by Jerry Sanders	Mayor of San Diego; 2012–2013	Succeeded by Todd Gloria; Acting
