= Nathaniel Fludd, Beastologist =

- Book 1 Cover
- Author: Robin LaFevers
- Illustrator: Kelly Murphy
- Cover artist: Kelly Murphy
- Language: English
- Genre: Fiction, Children's Literature
- Publisher: Houghton Mifflin Harcourt
- Publication date: 2009-2011
- Publication place: United States
- Media type: Print

Nathaniel Fludd, Beastologist is an ongoing series of chapter books for children written by Robin LaFevers and illustrated by Kelly Murphy. The books chronicle the adventures of young Nathaniel "Nate" Fludd, a beastologist in training who travels the world in search of mythical beasts, with his mentor Aunt Phil and pet gremlin Greasle. Sketches drawn by Nathaniel's hand are often featured in addition to the black and white art which illustrates the series.

The four published volumes have received awards from the Junior Library Guild in Fall 2009, Spring 2010, Winter 2011 and Spring 2011.

== Book 1: Flight of the Phoenix (2009) ==
The life of Nathaniel Fludd seems to have taken a turn for the worse when he is summoned to a lawyer's office to be told that his parents are lost at sea. Despite initial fears that he would end in the care of his cruel governess Miss Lumpton, Nathaniel is thankfully taken under the wing of a distant cousin, Aunt Phil (short for "Philomena"), the world's last beastologist. Soon Nate embarks on his first voyage, following Aunt Phil to Arabia to aid and witness the world's only Phoenix as it prepares to lay its new egg.

== Book 2: The Basilisk's Lair (2010) ==
Nathaniel joins Aunt Phil in a new adventure, travelling to Africa in search of the Basilisk. This King of Serpents is wreaking havoc and Nathaniel inherits the unenviable task of protecting the Dhughani village from its ire. On the way, Nate has trouble with his gremlin, Greasle. Nate wants to go home, but not after they have tracked down the beasts' tracks.

== Book 3: The Wyverns' Treasure (2010) ==
Home from Africa, Nathaniel and Aunt Phil find their English home ransacked. While looking for the thief, they are interrupted by a new emergency calling for beastologists. Wyverns, giant dragons dwelling the Welsh countryside, are in an uproar and threatening to break an oath of peace with humans.

== Book 4: The Unicorn's Tale (2011) ==
In the fourth installment of the series, Nathaniel travels to Brocéliande in search of a unicorn in distress.
