= Secrets at Sea =

2011 novel by Richard Peck

Secrets At Sea
- Author: Richard Peck
- Illustrator: Kelly Murphy
- Language: English
- Genre: Children's
- Publisher: Dial
- Publication date: 2011
- Publication place: United States
- Media type: Print
- Pages: 256
- ISBN: 0-1424-2183-9
- Followed by: The Mouse with the Question Mark Tail

Secrets at Sea is a 2011 children's novel written by Newbery medalist Richard Peck and illustrated by award-winning artist Kelly Murphy. It is a tale of a family of mice stowaways on an adventurous ship's journey, set in the late 19th century.

== Plot ==
The Story of the four mice and their journey on a ship.

== Characters ==
- Helena – The protagonist character, is the oldest mouse.
- Lamont
- Camilla
- Olive
- Duchess of Cheddar Gorge
- Nigel
- Mrs. Flora
- Mr. Floyd
- Lord Sebastian Sandown
- Mr. and Mrs. Cranston
- Mother and Father
- Katinka Van Tassel Dutch
- Vicky
- Alice
- Mrs. Flint
- Mona
- Mrs. Minture
- Gideon McSorley
- Barn
- Aunt Fannie Fanimore
- Elena
- Cecil
- Queen Victoria
- Lord Peter
- Lady Augusta Drear
- Nanny Pratt
- Little Lord Sandown
- The Mouse Queen

== Reception ==
Secrets at Sea has received widespread acclaim and was featured on best books of the year lists by The New York Times, Kirkus Reviews and People Magazine. Additionally, the artwork for Secrets at Sea received Gold Medals from the Society of Illustrators of Los Angeles, as well as distinction from the Society of Illustrators in New York.

== Awards ==
=== Best of lists ===
2011 Notable Children's Books, The New York Times
2011 Best Books for Children, Kirkus Reviews
2011 Ten Best Books for Children, People magazine

=== Starred reviews ===
2011 Starred Review, Publishers Weekly
2011 Starred Review, The Horn Book magazine
2011 Starred Review, Kirkus Reviews

=== Illustration competitions ===
2012 Original Art Show, Society of Illustrators
2013 Gold Medal (Children's Market Category), Society of Illustrators of Los Angeles
