= Grave Mercy =

2012 young adult fantasy novel by Robin LaFevers

- First edition (publ. HMH)
- Author: Robin LaFevers
- Language: English
- Genre: Young adult, Fantasy, Historical fiction
- Publisher: Houghton Mifflin Harcourt
- Publication date: April 3, 2012
- Pages: 549
- ISBN: 9780547628349 Hardcover
- Followed by: Dark Triumph

Grave Mercy is a 2012 young adult fantasy novel by Robin LaFevers. Grave Mercy is the recipient of the Booklist Editors' Choice: Books for Youth of in 2012-2013, and has been well received according to fan reviews.

A sequel, Dark Triumph, was published in 2013. It follows another sister from the Convent of St Mortain, Sybella. A third book, Mortal Heart, which tells the story of a third sister, Annith, was published in 2014. The books are referred to as the His Fair Assassin series. A fourth book, Courting Darkness, which continues the story of Sybella in France, was published in 2019.

== Plot ==
Grave Mercy is set in a fictionalized fifteenth-century Brittany, at a time when the nation was struggling to maintain its independence from France. 14-year-old peasant, Ismae Rienne, is feared and abused by her father and fellow villagers after she refused to succumb to the poison her mother drank to attempt to abort her in the womb, and left her with a large scar down her back. Ismae escapes from an arranged marriage with the aid of the very hedge priest that sold her mother the poison to abort her with no other option but to join at the St. Mortain convent where she learns to be an assassin in service of the God of Death, Mortain. Ismae learns of a dangerous gifts that Death has blessed her with, and a violent path ahead of her. The nuns reveal her immunity to poison and her ability to talk to spirits as they gave her a choice that directed her path into the royal courts. If she stayed at the convent she would train to be an assassin sent to take the lives of people marked by death. For three years she trains to be an assassin for Death's arsenal until she is sent on her first mission. After two successful missions she starts to notice the nuns are not as infallible as it seems, and starts to question the political connection among the targets which leads to her third mission. She must infiltrate the high court of Brittany to protect the duchess Anne of Brittany from enemies that they won't see coming and develops feelings for her target, the duchess's illegitimate half-brother, Gavriel Duval.

== Awards and honors ==
Year	Award	Result	Ref.
2013	Georgia Peach Book Award	Honor	
2013	Milwaukee County Teen Book Award	Nominee	
2013	RITA Award Young Adult Romance	Nominee	
2014-2015	Iowa High School Book Award	Nominee	
2015	Green Mountain Book Award	Nominee	
2015	Mythopoeic Fantasy Award for Children's Literature	Nominee	
2017	Abe Lincoln Teen Choice Book Award	Nominee	
2017	Lincoln Award	Nominee	
