= Masterpiece (novel) =

2008 novel by Elise Broach

- Paperback Cover
- Author: Elise Broach
- Illustrator: Kelly Murphy
- Language: English
- Genre: Fiction, Children's Literature
- Publisher: Christy Ottaviano Books, Henry Holt and Company
- Publication date: 2008
- Publication place: United States
- Media type: Print
- Pages: 304
- ISBN: 0-8050-8270-0

Masterpiece is a 2008 novel written by Elise Broach, illustrated by Kelly Murphy, and published by Christy Ottaviano Books. It won a 2008 Publishers Weekly Best Book of the Year in Children’s Fiction, the 2009 E.B. White Read Aloud Award, a 2009 ALA Notable Children's Book, and is a New York Times Best Seller.

As of 2023, Masterpiece has been translated in Catalan, French, German, Hebrew, Hungarian, Japanese, Korean, Mandarin, Portuguese, Russian, Spanish, Thai, and Turkish.

== Plot ==
Masterpiece is a middle-grade mystery about stolen art, miniature worlds, and the surprising friendship between a talented beetle, Marvin, and a lonely eleven-year-old boy named James. When James receives a pen-and-ink set for his birthday, Marvin discovers that he can create tiny, intricately detailed scenes by dipping his front legs in the cap of ink and drawing on paper. James is mistakenly credited with Marvin's amazing pictures, and soon the beetle and boy are swept up in an adventure at the Metropolitan Museum of Art that involves masterpieces, forgeries, and a stolen pen-and-ink drawing by the great Renaissance artist Albrecht Dürer, which Marvin and James are determined to recover. With echoes of The Cricket in Times Square, From the Mixed-Up Files of Mrs. Basil E. Frankweiler, and Charlotte's Web, this novel explores friendship, sacrifice, and moral dilemmas in the context of a high-stakes art heist.
