= The Mouse with the Question Mark Tail =

2013 children's novel by Richard Peck

- Author: Richard Peck
- Illustrator: Kelly Murphy
- Language: English
- Genre: Children's
- Publisher: Dial
- Publication date: 2013
- Publication place: United States
- Media type: Print
- Pages: 256
- ISBN: 978-0142425305
- Preceded by: Secrets at Sea

The Mouse with the Question Mark Tail is a 2013 children's novel written by Richard Peck and illustrated Kelly Murphy. The book is set in the same universe as Secrets at Sea. The novel is suitable as reading for grades four through six.

Set in Victorian England, the story features a mouse who tries to discover his origins by asking Queen Victoria.

== Plot ==
A mouse in London in search of information about his identity ends up at Windsor Castle.

== Characters ==
- Mouse Minor/Prince Ludovic - The protagonist, a white mouse who was born in London England. He lives in the Royal Mews next door to Buckingham Palace.
- Yeomice - The Captain of the Guard of Mouse Minor's father.
- Aunt Marigold – Mouse Minor's aunt.
- The Mouse Queen – The Queen of the mice of the United Kingdom. She is Mouse Minor's grandmother.
- Queen Victoria - The human Queen of the United Kingdom. In the book, she is celebrating her Diamond Jubilee.
- Fitzherbert and Trevor - They are the bullies of mouse minor. Fitzherbert is the son of the Mouse Permanent Superintendent of the Mews, while Trevor is the son of the Mouse Controller of Stores.
- Ian
- Prince Bruno Havarti
- Princess Ena – The Queen's granddaughter.
- Prince Albert
- B. Chiroptera
- Queen Ann
- Pegasus
- The Bat Chancellor
- The Mouse Princess – (Uncredited) The Mouse queen's daughter. She is the wife of the Captain of the Guard. She gives birth to Mouse Minor, but dies shortly afterwards.

== Reception ==
Critical reception for The Mouse with the Question Mark Tail was positive. Commonsensemedia rated the book highly, stating that "In-jokes and historical tidbits will delight older kids and give reading-aloud adults the giggles."

== Awards ==
=== Best of lists ===
- 2014 3x3 Magazine Annual No.11 3x3 Picture Book Show (Honorable Mention) People Magazine
- 2013 Notable Children's Books, The New York Times
- 2013 Best Books for Children Kirkus Reviews
- 2013 Ten Best Books for Children, People Magazine

=== Starred reviews ===
- 2013 Starred Review, School Library Journal
- 2013 Starred Review, Publishers Weekly
- 2013 Starred Review, Booklist

=== Illustration competitions ===
- 2014 The Illustrators 56 Travel Show
- 2013 Society of Illustrators 56th Annual Competition (Book Category)
- 2013 Original Art, Society of Illustrators
- 2013 Gold Medal (Children's Market Category), Society of Illustrators of Los Angeles
