= The Grind (2012 film) =

- The Grind DVD release poster
- Directed by: Rishi Opel
- Written by: Rishi Opel
- Produced by: Rishi Opel; Freddie Connor
- Starring: Jamie Foreman; Danny John-Jules; Zoe Tapper; Kellie Shirley; Gordon Alexander; Freddie Connor
- Cinematography: Bo Bilstrup
- Edited by: Rishi Opel
- Music by: Paul Saunderson
- Production company: The Grind Productions
- Distributed by: 4Digital Media
- Release date: 16 April 2012
- Running time: 87 minutes
- Country: United Kingdom
- Language: English
- Budget: £100,000
- Box office: TBA

The Grind is a 2012 crime drama film written and directed by Rishi Opel, and starring Jamie Foreman, Freddie Connor, Gordon Alexander, Zoe Tapper, Danny John-Jules and Kellie Shirley.

== Plot ==
Vince, a nightclub manager of The Grind in Hackney, East London, has fought his way to a decent living and respectable lifestyle; he is determined to settle down and take life easier. Bobby, Vince's best friend from school, is released from prison and their friendship soon falls apart. Bobby's addiction to cocaine and gambling spirals out of control and he now owes a huge amount of money to Vince's boss, Dave, owner of The Grind and an East End loan shark. Vince's life takes a dramatic turn for the worse.

== Cast ==
- Jamie Foreman as Dave Foreman
- Danny John-Jules as Phil
- Zoe Tapper as Nancy
- Gordon Alexander as Bobby Alexander
- Freddie Connor as Vince
- Kellie Shirley as Jo
- Joseph Morgan as Paul
- Jonathan Hansler as Comedian
- Ashley McGuire as Linda
- Barber Ali as Big Guy
- Duncan Clyde as Tony Dixy
- Sway DaSafo as Dave's Enforcer
- Sheraiah Larcher as Bassy
- Steve Frayne (Dynamo) as Street Hustler
- Momo Yeung as Dancer

== Production and adaptation ==
The film is the feature version of a short of the same name by Rishi Opel, which was adapted into another film by Brendon O'Loughlin, with a similar cast, released 2 years before this one, Baseline (2010).

== Reception ==
Barry Forshaw wrote that there were "signs of compromise due to budgetary restrictions" in the film, whose female characters were "underwritten", but that the production contained "good things". Other reviews were negative.
