= Aviation Maintenance Technician Day =

Aviation maintenance workers day of recognition

Aviation Maintenance Technician Day is a day of recognition, observed on May 24, that recognizes the efforts of aviation maintenance professionals as well as the achievements of Charles Edward Taylor, the man who built the engine used to power the airplane of the Wright brothers. The date May 24 was selected to honor the birth date of Taylor. The day of recognition is currently observed by 45 states in the United States. On May 24, 2007, a United States House of Representatives resolution supporting the goals and ideals of a National Aviation Maintenance Technician Day was introduced. Congressman Bob Filner of California was the sponsor of the resolution. On April 30, 2008, the resolution passed by a voice vote.

== Content of the Resolution ==
The text of the resolution reads, in part: "Resolved, That the House of Representatives-- (1) supports National Aviation Maintenance Technician Day to honor the professional men and women who ensure the safety and security of our airborne aviation infrastructure; and (2) recognizes the life and memory of Charles Edward Taylor, the aviation maintenance technician who built and maintained the engine that was used to power the Wright brothers' first controlled flying machine on December 17, 1903.
