= Eric Telchin =

American author/artist (born 1978)

- Born: December 4, 1978 (age 47)
- Notable work: Boy Sees Hearts, See a Heart, Share a Heart
- Website: www.BoySeesHearts.com

Eric Telchin (born December 4, 1978) is an American author/artist, best known for his Boy Sees Hearts project, which showcases photographs of naturally occurring heart shapes. His book, See a Heart, Share a Heart was published by Dial Books for Young Readers, a division of Penguin Young Readers Group on December 6, 2012.

== Biography ==
While hosting a party in 2009, Eric Telchin photographed a heart-shaped puddle of melted ice cream on his kitchen counter. He began capturing more naturally occurring hearts with his iPhone. In 2010, he launched Boy Sees Hearts, a project showcasing the thousands of unaltered heart photos. In December, 2012, Dial Books for Young Readers (an imprint of the Penguin Young Readers Group) published his book, See a Heart, Share a Heart, a 48-page picture book featuring 214 of images from Telchin's collection, paired with loose, interpretive text.

Telchin grew up in Niskayuna, New York and graduated magna cum laude from George Washington University as a Presidential Arts Scholar in 2000. After graduation, he worked at ABC News as a broadcast designer and for Washingtonpost.com as a Senior Designer.

Telchin currently resides in West Palm Beach, Florida.

== Works ==
See a Heart, Share a Heart, Dial Books for Young Readers, Penguin, December 6, 2012

== Reception ==
In January, 2011, Telchin created a 10'x9' wall of hearts for an episode of ABC's Extreme Makeover: Home Edition.

Publishers Weekly says of See a Heart, Share a Heart that "the subtlety of the images points to the value of being receptive to and perceptive of one's environment."
