= Elise Broach =

American writer

- Born: September 20, 1963 (age 62)
- Education: Yale University
- Occupation: Writer
- Writing career
- Notable work: Masterpiece (2008)
- Notable awards: The E.B. White Read Aloud Award (2008, 2009)
- Website: www.elisebroach.com

Elise Broach (born September 20, 1963) is an American writer. Her publications include the acclaimed novels Shakespeare's Secret, Desert Crossing, and Masterpiece. She holds undergraduate and graduate degrees in history from Yale University and lives in Easton, Connecticut.

== Book awards ==
Broach's book When Dinosaurs Came with Everything was a 2008 ALA Notable Children's Book, earned an Illinois Monarch Award nomination and an E.B. White Read Aloud Award. It was also listed as the number one Children's Book of 2007 by Time.

Shakespeare's Secret was 2006 Edgar Award Juvenile Mystery finalist.

Masterpiece, illustrated by Kelly Murphy, was a 2008 Publishers Weekly Best Book of the Year in Children's Fiction, a 2009 ALA Notable Children's Book, and is the winner of the 2009 E. B. White Read Aloud Award and a New York Times best seller.

== Bibliography ==
=== Novels ===
- Shakespeare's Secret, Henry Holt and Co., 2005
- Desert Crossing, Henry Holt and Co., 2006
- The Wolf Keepers, illustrated by Alice Ratterree, Henry Holt and Co., 2016

==== Superstition Mountain trilogy ====
1. Missing on Superstition Mountain, Henry Holt and Co., 2011
2. Treasure on Superstition Mountain, Henry Holt and Co., 2013
3. Revenge of Superstition Mountain, Henry Holt and Co., 2014

==== The Masterpiece Adventures ====
1. Masterpiece, illustrated by Kelly Murphy, Henry Holt and Co., 2008
2. The Miniature World of Marvin & James, Henry Holt and Co., 2014
3. James to the Rescue, Henry Holt and Co., 2015
4. Trouble at School for Marvin & James, Henry Holt and Co., 2017
5. Marvin and James Save the Day and Elaine Helps!, 2019
6. A Trip to the Country for Marvin & James, 2020

=== Picture books ===
- What the No-Good Baby is Good For, illustrated by Abby Carter, G.P. Putnam's Sons, 2005
- Hiding Hoover, illustrated by Laura Juliska-Beith, Dial Books for Young Readers, 2005
- Wet Dog, illustrated by David Catrow, Dial Books for Young Readers, 2005
- Cousin John is Coming!, illustrated by Nate Lilly, Dial Books for Young Readers, 2006
- When Dinosaurs Came With Everything, illustrated by David Small, Atheneum Books for Young Readers, 2007
- Gumption!, illustrated by Richard Egielski, Atheneum Books for Young Readers, 2010
- Seashore Baby, illustrated by Cori Doerrfeld, Little, Brown, 2010
- Snowflake Baby, illustrated by Cori Doerrfeld, Little, Brown, 2011
- My Pet Wants a Pet, illustrated by Eric Barclay, Henry Holt and Co, 2018
- Bedtime for Little Bulldozer, illustrated by Barry E. Jackson, Henry Holt and Co, 2019
