= Atha Tehon =

Art director at Dial Books for Young Readers

- Born: Atha Lee Tehon; January 20, 1926
- Died: February 15, 2012 (aged 86)
- Other names: Atha Tehon Thiras
- Education: University of Pennsylvania School of Design
- Occupation: Art director
- Known for: Book design, type design

Atha Tehon Thiras (January 20, 1926 – February 15, 2012), professionally credited as Atha Tehon, was the daughter and second child of Dr. Leo Roy Tehon and Mrs. Leo Tehon, of Illinois.

Tehon was a student at the Jerry Farnsworth School in North Truro in the summers of 1947 and 1948, and graduated with an MFA from the University of Pennsylvania School of Design in 1949.

== Work ==
Tehon served as the art director at Dial Books for Young Readers for 32 years, retiring in 2001. A number of the books she worked on received Caldecott medals and honors including: Why Mosquitoes Buzz in People's Ears, Ashanti to Zulu, Moja Means One, and Jambo Means Hello: Swahili Alphabet Book. She also worked as a freelance designer for Farrar, Straus and Giroux.
