= Theodosia and the Serpents of Chaos =

2007 novel by R. L. LaFevers

- First edition
- Author: R. L. LaFevers
- Cover artist: Yoko Tanaka
- Language: English
- Genre: Children's, fantasy
- Published: 2007 Houghton Mifflin
- Publication place: United States
- Media type: Print (hardback)
- Pages: 344
- Followed by: Theodosia and the Staff of Osiris

Theodosia and the Serpents of Chaos is a children's novel by R. L. LaFevers.

== Plot ==
Theodosia Throckmorton, a clever and shrewd girl of sorts, has the harrowing and busy work of nullifying curses in her father's museum, where the darkest spells abound. However, it is delicate work, and time is running out for her to set things right. A crate arrives from Theo's mother in Egypt, which contains a cursed statue of Bastet. While transferring the curse from the statue to a wax figure, she becomes distracted and redirects it into her cat, Isis. Her hands are full enough when her mother returns from the tombs of Egypt, bringing countless cursed valuables and antiquities with her. While picking her mother up at the train station, Theodosia catches a street urchin named Sticky Will trying to pick her father's pocket. He informs her that someone is following her mother. Theo tells him she will be at the station tomorrow and he can tell her more about the man then. Back at the museum, they unload Theo's mother's trunks. Theo senses the curses on the artifacts. The most powerful is a gem called the Heart of Egypt, with the power to topple the whole of Great Britain and the entire British Empire.

The next day, her brother Henry returns from boarding school. The Heart of Egypt is stolen, and Theo suspects someone from the British Museum and investigates, Henry tagging along without her consent. A Mr. Tetley is acting suspiciously, and they decide to follow him. While traveling through the Seven Dials, they meet Will and witness a man taking the Heart from Tetley, then the same man is stabbed in a churchyard. Theodosia hears the man mumble "Som set hoo", or "Somerset House". He tells Theo to speak to Wigmere, only Wigmere. She sends Henry and Will to Somerset House while she struggles to keep the man alive using her amulets. Will and Henry bring help, and Theo is introduced to Lord Wigmere, head of the Antiquarian Society and The Brotherhood of Chosen Keepers, a group dedicated to nullifying curses. Theodosia is relieved to know there are others like her, but disturbed that no one else can sense the curses the way she can. Henry and Will are not told the true nature of the Keepers, although Will is taken on as a message boy later on. Theo is also angry that Wigmere may suspect her mother of stealing the Heart of Egypt, as she works closely with Count Von Braggenchnot, head of the Serpents of Chaos who will do anything to rain plague and pestilence down on England.

After Theodosia escapes, she sneaks onto a ship on which her mother and father are traveling to go to Egypt. While in Egypt, Theodosia finds a hidden part of a pyramid. She discovers that the First Assistant Curator, Nigel Bollingsworth, is the traitor. Theodosia is very clever, and uses the Egyptian version of voodoo dolls to hurt Tetley. She reaches into the pocket of her pinafore and throws sand from the tomb at Nigel, the left side of his face dissolving. Clever Theo finds another tomb and returns the Heart of Egypt to its rightful place. Theodosia finds an important artifact—the Was scepter—and hits Nigel on the head with it.

Theo is rescued by her parents and Nabir, her mother's dragoman. They return home, where Wigmere gives Theodosia a ring, and Theo becomes an official member of the Brotherhood of the Chosen Keepers.

== Character list ==
- Theodosia Elizabeth Throckmorton: Main Character, an eleven-year-old girl with magical vision and the ability to sense curses. Theodosia is very clever, and has an excessive knowledge of artifacts. She has a brother named Henry and a cat named Isis.
- Henry Throckmorton: Theodosia's brother, a troublemaker, who assists with his sister in her schemes.
- Sticky Will: A London pickpocket, that Theodosia met when he tried to steal her father's wallet. Who is now an errand boy for the Brotherhood of the Chosen Keepers.
- Lord Wigmere: Head of the Brotherhood of the Chosen Keepers, a knowledgeable old man who knows to listen to Theodosia when she's serious.
- Grandmother Throckmorton: Theodosia's grandmother. She often cares for Theodosia when both her parents are away.
- Henrietta Throckmorton "Mother": An archaeologist who works for the Museum of Legends and Antiquities. She often brings back artifacts from her digs.
- Alistair Throckmorton "Father": A research specialist at the Museum of Legends and Antiquities.
- Nigel Bollingsworth: First Assistant Curator at the Museum of Legends and Antiquities. Theodosia planned to marry him, at least before he turned out to be a traitor.
- Clive Fagenbush: Second Assistant Curator at the Museum of Legends and Antiquities and Chosen Keeper in training. Pickled cabbages and boiled onions combined seems to be his signature scent.
- Edgar Stilton: Third Assistant Curator at the Museum of Legends and Antiquities. Tends to stutter quite often.
- Von Braggenschnot: A sinister German, partial to guns. Leader of the Serpents of Chaos.

== Awards ==
Theodosia and the Serpents of Chaos is a Junior Library Guild Selection and a Booksense Summer Pick.

== Television series ==
A television series based on the Theodosia book series was announced on February 25, 2021 with Eloise Little playing Theodosia with production to begin in April 2021. The series premiered on March 10, 2022 on HBO Max in the United States.
