= A Long Way from Chicago =

1998 novel by Richard Peck

A Long Way from Chicago: A Novel in Stories
- First edition
- Author: Richard Peck
- Illustrator: Yang Hee
- Language: English
- Subject: Coming of age
- Genre: Children's historical fiction
- Published: September 1, 1998 Dial Press
- Publication place: United States
- Media type: Print (hardback & paperback)
- Pages: 148 pp
- ISBN: 978-0-803-72290-3
- OCLC: 38249685
- LC Class: PZ7.P338 Ll 1998
- Followed by: A Year Down Yonder

A Long Way from Chicago is a "novel in stories" (or short story cycle) by Richard Peck, published September 1, 1998 by Dial Press.

== Plot ==
=== Shotgun Cheatham's Last Night Above Ground, 1929 ===
(Originally printed in Twelve Shots: Stories About Guns, 1997)

The first summer the children go to their grandmother's house, a reporter arrives seeking information about an infamous man who has just died, Shotgun Cheatham. Grandma Dowdel holds an open house for Cheatham, attended by the reporter and her enemy, Effie Wilcox. Grandma lies to the reporter, saying he was a war hero. When the coffin begins to move, Grandma shoots it with her shotgun, while Ms. Wilcox and the reporter run out. They discover the cat who lives in the Cobb house, which had moved the curtain draped over the coffin.

=== The Mouse in the Milk, 1930 ===
The next summer, the Cowgill boys are tormenting the town by blowing up Grandma Dowdel's mailbox, then Effie Wilcox's privy. Grandma tells one of the boys she won't be home for her daily milk delivery, knowing the boys would try to steal something from her. That night she turns the lights off and waits for them, catching them in the act, while Joey gets their parents. Grandma tells Mr. Cowgill that if his boys don't stop, she'll tell everyone that she found a mouse in her milk, discrediting his business.

=== A One-Woman Crime Wave, 1931 ===
Grandma Dowdel uses illegal fish traps to catch catfish from the town lake, in order to feed drifters, using the sheriff's stolen boat. Grandma is spotted by the sheriff's deputies while fishing, but they seem too intoxicated to understand the situation.

=== The Day of Judgment, 1932 ===
Grandma Dowdel's gooseberry pie goes up against Rupert Pennypacker's in a pie baking contest at the fair, competing for her town's honor and a flight in a biplane. Grandma switches the nameplates on the pies at the last minute. Rupert Pennypacker wins the contest with Grandma's pie, but Grandma still finds a way to get Joey a ride in an airplane.

=== The Phantom Brakeman, 1933 ===
While Mary Alice is recently idolizing a tap dancer and film actress Shirley Temple, mismatched families of local lovers converge on Grandma Dowdel's house and she uses an old ghost story to aid them. At night time Vandalia Eubanks and Junior Stubbs run away together with the help of "The Phantom Brakeman" (Joey) and Grandma.

=== Things with Wings, 1934 ===
While Joey is having a love affair with a new car model, the Hudson Terraplane 8, Grandma Dowdel is finding a way to force banker Mr. Weidenbach to return Mrs. Effie Wilcox to her foreclosed home amidst rumors about Abe Lincoln.

=== Centennial Summer, 1935 ===
During a centennial celebration in town, Grandma Dowdel has a showdown with Mrs. Weidenbach about whose family has the most talent, and the county's oldest living veteran.

=== The Troop Train, 1942 ===
Joey joins the Army Air Corps because he loves airplanes. He sends a telegram to Grandma Dowdel telling her that he will be passing through her town. When the train comes through, Joey sees Grandma's house lit up, as well as Grandma herself waving to each train car passing by, in the hopes that they would spot each other. Joey waves back and goes on to fight in World War II.

== Reception ==
A Long Way from Chicago was awarded the Newbery Honor in 1999. Peck's sequel to this book, A Year Down Yonder, won the Newbery Medal for children's literature in 2001. Matt Berman from Common Sense Media rated A Long Way from Chicago five stars. Kirkus Reviews described the book as a "wry tale ranging from humorous to poignant". In 2012 it was ranked number 67 on a list of the top 100 children's novels published by School Library Journal.
