= Kelly Murphy =

American author and illustrator

Kelly Murphy is an American author and illustrator based in Providence, Rhode Island.

== Early life ==
Murphy was born in Boston, Massachusetts and raised in southeastern Massachusetts. She attended the Rhode Island School of Design (RISD) in Providence, Rhode Island. Her student work received distinction from the Society of Illustrators of New York. After graduating with a Bachelor of Fine Arts degree in illustration in 1999, Murphy started a freelance career as an editorial and children's books illustrator.

== Career ==
She wrote and illustrated her first picture book, The Boll Weevil Ball, in 2002 and has since illustrated more than 50 books for children, including stories written by authors Dave Eggers, J. Patrick Lewis, Linda Sue Park, Richard Peck, Beatrix Potter and Jane Yolen. Murphy has also created artwork for theater, film and animation, including character designs for the Sesame Workshop animated show Esme & Roy on HBO, and the 2013 documentary Muscle Shoals.

She has taught at the Massachusetts College of Art and Design and Montserrat College of Art, and is a faculty member of the Rhode Island School of Design.

== Awards ==
In 2009 Murphy earned an E.B. White Read Aloud Award for illustrating the New York Times Best Seller Masterpiece, written by Elise Broach. She subsequently illustrated books in a companion series for younger readers, The Masterpiece Adventures, by the same author.

In 2019 All the Greys on Greene Street, written by Laura Tucker and illustrated by Murphy, was distinguished as a best book of the year by The New York Times, Kirkus Reviews, BookPage and Publishers Weekly.

Kelly Murphy's book Together We Build was the state of Rhode Island's 2026 Great Reads Kids selection for the Library of Congress National Book Festival which was held in Washington, DC, on August 22nd, 2026.

== Exhibitions ==
Murphy was one of 5 artists whose work was exhibited in the 18th Annual Children's Book Illustrators' Show & Signing at the Chemers Gallery in Tustin, CA in 2009.

Murphy's original art was exhibited in the 2010 Children's Book Illustrators Exhibition at the Brush Art Gallery & Studios, with fellow RISD alumni illustrators Christopher Bing, David Macaulay and David Wiesner.

Murphy's work has been exhibited at the Museum of American Illustration in New York City, NY.

In 2012, Murphy's work received a Gold Award in the Illustration West 50 competition and was exhibited at the Gallery Nucleus in Alhambra, California. Murphy was also chosen from RISD's illustrious alumni as one of the artists featured in RISD ICONS: A Legacy of Illustration from the Rhode Island School of Design exhibit at the Woods Gerry Gallery.

In 2014, Murphy was a keynote speaker at the Society of Children's Book Writers and Illustrators 2014 Writers & Illustrators Working Conference in Austin, Texas.

Murphy is one of the illustrators and authors presenting at the Lincoln School's 2018 Rhode Island Festival of Children's Books and Authors.

== Bibliography ==
=== Chapter books ===
- Masterpiece (2008, Illustrator, written by Elise Broach)
- Flight of the Phoenix (Nathaniel Fludd, Beastologist, Book 1) (2009, Illustrator, written by R. L. LaFevers)
- The Basilisk's Lair (Nathaniel Fludd, Beastologist, Book 2) (2010, Illustrator, written by R. L. LaFevers)
- The Wyverns' Treasure (Nathaniel Fludd, Beastologist, Book 3) (2010, Illustrator, written by R. L. LaFevers)
- Haunted Houses (Are You Scared Yet?) (2010, Co-illustrated with Antoine Revoy, written by Robert D. San Souci)
- The Unicorn's Tale (Nathaniel Fludd, Beastologist, Book 4) (2011, Illustrator, written by R. L. LaFevers)
- Secrets at Sea (2011, Illustrator, written by Richard Peck)
- Alex and the Amazing Time Machine (2012, Illustrator, written by Rich Cohen)
- The Scorpions of Zahir (2012, Illustrator, written by Christine Brodien-Jones)
- Behind the Bookcase (2012, Illustrator, written by Mark Steensland)
- The Mouse with the Question Mark Tail (2013, Illustrator, written by Richard Peck)
- Anton and Cecil: Cats at Sea (2013, Illustrator, written by Lisa and Valerie Martin)
- The Miniature World of Marvin and James (2014, Illustrator, written by Elise Broach)
- The Wollstonecraft Detective Agency, Book 1: The Case of the Missing Moonstone (2015, Illustrator, written by Jordan Stratford)
- James to the Rescue (2015, Illustrator, written by Elise Broach)
- The Door by the Staircase (2016, Illustrator, written by Katherine Marsh)
- The Wollstonecraft Detective Agency, Book 2: The Case of the Girl in Grey (2016, Illustrator, written by Jordan Stratford)
- Anton and Cecil: Cats Aloft (2016, Illustrator, written by Lisa and Valerie Martin)
- The Wollstonecraft Detective Agency, Book 3: The Case of the Counterfeit Criminals (2017, Illustrator, written by Jordan Stratford)
- Trouble at School for Marvin & James (2017, Illustrator, written by Elise Broach)
- A Properly Unhaunted Place (2017, Illustrator, written by William Alexander)
- The Wollstonecraft Detective Agency, Book 4: The Case of the Perilous Palace (2018, Illustrator, written by Jordan Stratford)
- A Festival of Ghosts (2018, Illustrator, written by William Alexander)
- All The Greys on Greene Street (2019, Illustrator, written by Laura Tucker)
- A Trip to the Country for Marvin & James (2020, Illustrator, written by Elise Broach)
- Happily for Now (2021, Illustrator, written by Kelly Jones)
- Ginny Off the Map (2023, Illustrator, written by Caroline Hickey)
- Bulldozer and Friends Vol 1: Bulldozer's Big Rescue (2025, Illustrator, written by Elise Broach)
- Bulldozer and Friends Vol 2: Bulldozer Goes to School (2025, Illustrator, written by Elise Broach)
- Witchward Bound: A Butter and Owl Adventure (2026, Illustrator, written by Erin Bow)
- Licorice (2026, Illustrator, written by Kara LaReau)

=== Picture books ===
- The Boll Weevil Ball (2002)
- A Place To Grow (2002, Illustrator, written by Stephanie Bloom)
- Loony Little (2003, Illustrator, written by Dianna Hutts Aston)
- Dancing Matilda (2004, Illustrator, written by Sarah Hager)
- Good Babies (2005, Illustrator, written by Tim Myers)
- Fiona's Luck (2007, Illustrator, written by Teresa Bateman)
- Gallop-O-Gallop (2007, Illustrator, written by Sandra Alonso)
- Hush, Little Dragon (2008, Illustrator, written by Boni Ashburn)
- The Peach Boy (2009, Illustrator, written by Alex Frith)
- Brand-New Baby Blues (2009, Illustrator, written by Kathi Appelt)
- Over At The Castle (2009, Illustrator, written by Boni Ashburn)
- Creepy Monsters, Sleepy Monsters (2011, Illustrator, written by Jane Yolen)
- Face Bug (2013, Illustrator, written by J. Patrick Lewis, photographs by Fred Siskind)
- Romping Monsters, Stomping Monsters (2013, Illustrator, written by Jane Yolen)
- The Slowest Book Ever (2016, Illustrator, written by April Pulley Sayre)
- Together We Grow (2020, Illustrator, written by Susan Vaught)
- Faraway Things (2021, Illustrator, written by Dave Eggers)
- Dakota Crumb: Tiny Treasure Hunter (2021, Illustrator, written by Jamie Michalak)
- Dakota Crumb and the Secret Bookshop: A Tiny Treasure Hunt (2023, Illustrator, written by Jamie Michalak)
- Goat Is The G.O.A.T. (2025, Illustrator, written by Bea Birdsong)
- Together We Build (2026, Illustrator, written by Susan Vaught)
