= Robin LaFevers =

American novelist

Robin Lorraine LaFevers
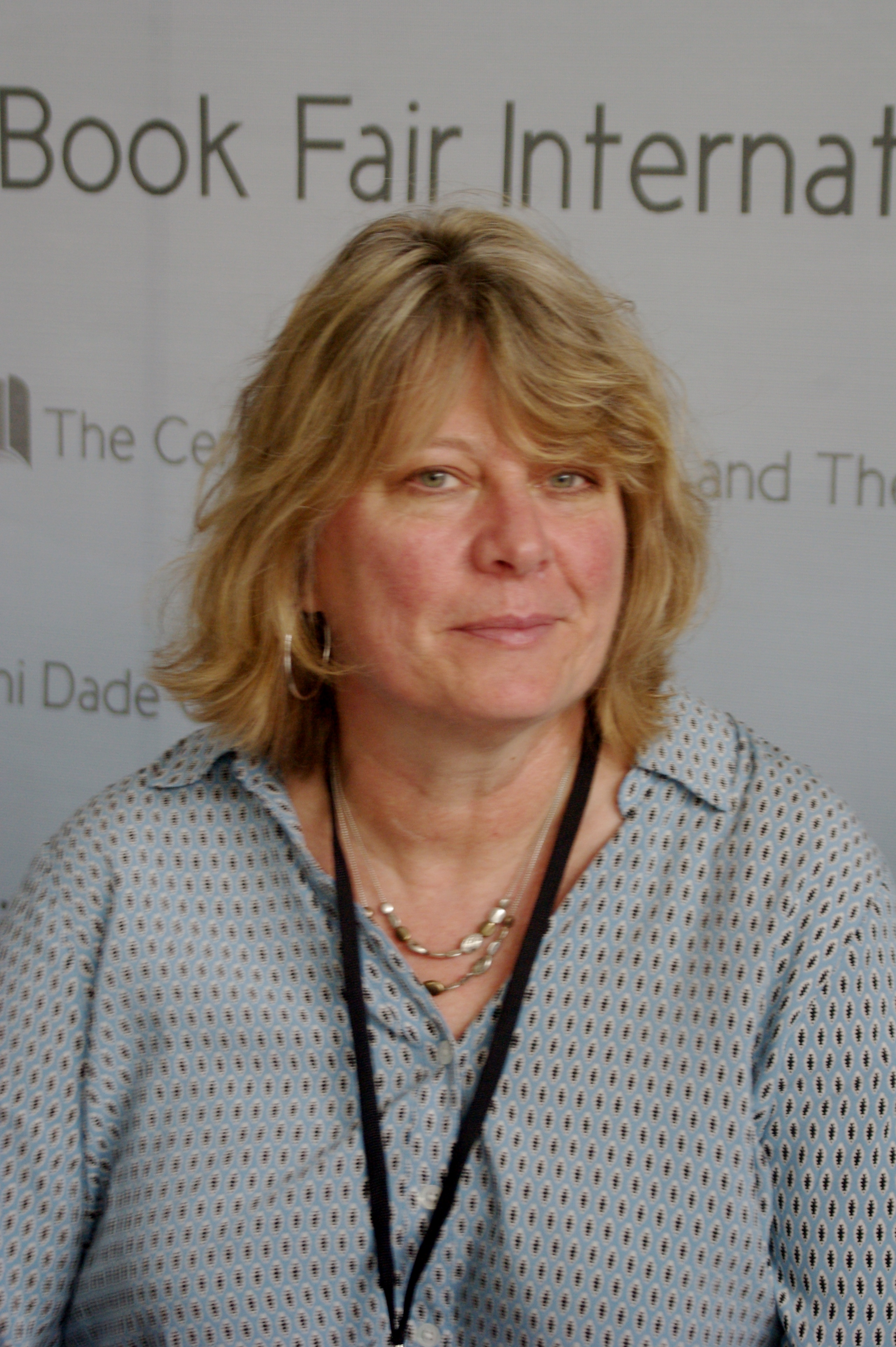
- LaFevers at the Miami Book Fair International 2014
- Citizenship: US
- Occupation: Author
- Children: 2
- Writing career
- Pen name: R. L. LaFevers, Robin LaFevers
- Language: English
- Genre: Children's literature
- Notable awards: Junior Library Guild Selection
- Website: www.robinlafevers.com

Robin Lorraine LaFevers is an American children's book writer from California.

She is the author of the Theodosia series (illustrated by Yoko Tanaka) and Nathaniel Fludd, Beastologist series (illustrated by Kelly Murphy) for children. She is the author of the His Fair Assassin series for young adults.

== Personal life ==
La Fevers grew up in Los Angeles and now resides on a small ranch in Southern California with her husband and two sons. LaFevers has had a lifelong love of animals, which often make appearances in her novels, and a sensitivity to ecological responsibility best apparent in the Nathaniel Fludd books. She admits to a belief in the magical, which is also a driving element of stories such as Theodosia and the Serpents of Chaos.

== Awards ==
Her novel Flight of the Phoenix was selected by the Junior Library Guild in 2009. YALSA named Dark Triumph as one of the Best Fiction for Young Adults for 2014. It also received a 2014 Indies Choice Book Award Young Adult Honor

Grave Mercy was a 2014-2015 Iowa High School Book Award nominee and a 2017 Abe Lincoln Teen Choice Book Award nominee.

Theodosia and the Serpents of Chaos is a Junior Library Guild Selection and a Booksense Summer Pick.

== Works ==
=== Standalone ===
- The Falconmaster (2003)
- Werewolf Rising (2006)
- Wild Daughters of Ares (Anticipated, 2020) - On Hold

=== His Fair Assassin series ===
The series, published under the name Robin LaFevers, received a nomination for the 2015 Mythopoeic Fantasy Award for Children's Literature. It takes place in Brittany (now part of France) during the late 15th century. The first three books are considered the "His Fair Assassin" trilogy; the final two books are considered the "Courting Darkness Duology."

1. Grave Mercy (2012) Boston: Houghton Mifflin. ISBN 9780547628349
2. Dark Triumph (2013) Boston: Houghton Mifflin. ISBN 9780547628387
3. Mortal Heart (2014) Boston; New York: Houghton Mifflin Harcourt. ISBN 9780547628400
1. Courting Darkness (2019) Boston: Houghton Mifflin Harcourt. ISBN 9780544991194
2. Igniting Darkness (2020) Houghton Mifflin Harcourt. ISBN 9780544991095

=== Lowthar's Blade series ===
A fantasy series for young readers published under the name R. L. LaFevers.

1. The Forging of the Blade (2004)
2. The Secrets of Grim Wood (2005)
3. The True Blade of Power (2005)

=== Nathaniel Fludd, Beastologist series ===
This series for young readers appeared under the name R.L. LaFevers. Kelly Murphy illustrated the series. It follows the adventures of Nathaniel (Nate) Fludd as he travels the world in search of mythical beasts.

1. Flight of the Phoenix (2009)
2. The Basilisk's Lair (2010)
3. The Wyverns' Treasure (2010)
4. The Unicorn's Tale (2011)
5. TBD (anticipated post-2020, on hold)

=== Theodosia ===
In this middle grade children's series, published as R. L. LaFevers, taking place in Edwardian London and Egypt, Theodosia has Egyptology-themed adventures as she protects the world from curses found on ancient artifacts recovered by her parents. A television series, titled Theodosia, was announced on February 25, 2021, with Eloise Little playing the title role and production beginning in April 2021.

1. Theodosia and the Serpents of Chaos (2007)
2. Theodosia and the Staff of Osiris (2008)
3. Theodosia and the Eyes of Horus (2010)
4. Theodosia and the Last Pharaoh (2011)
5. Theodosia and the Flame of Sekhmet (anticipated post-2020, on hold)

=== Nonfiction writing ===
Contributions to Author in Progress: A No-Holds-Barred Guide to What it Really Takes to get Published (2016, Editor Therese Walsh).
