= The Dial Press =

American publishing company

- Parent company: Penguin Random House
- Founded: 1923
- Founder: Lincoln MacVeagh
- Country of origin: United States
- Headquarters location: New York City
- Imprints: Dial Books for Young Readers
- Official website: thedialpress.com (adult) penguin.com (children)

The Dial Press is a publishing house founded in 1923 by Lincoln MacVeagh.

The Dial Press shared a building with The Dial and Scofield Thayer worked with both. The first imprint was issued in 1924.

Authors included Elizabeth Bowen, W. R. Burnett and Glenway Wescott, Frank Yerby, James Baldwin, Roy Campbell, Susan Berman, Herbert Gold, Thomas Berger, Vance Bourjaily, Judith Rossner, and Norman Mailer.

== History ==
In 1963, Dell Publishing Company acquired 60 percent of The Dial Press's stock but the Press remained an independent subsidiary. It was jointly owned by Richard Baron (1923–2021) and Dell Publishing; E. L. Doctorow was editor-in-chief. In 1969 The Dial Press became wholly owned by Dell Publishing Company. In 1976 Doubleday bought Dell Publishing and the children's division of The Dial Press (Dial Books for Young Readers) was sold to E. P. Dutton. The children's division of Dial Press published books under the Pied Piper imprint. Dutton was bought by New American Library, which in turn became a part of the Penguin Group, a division of Pearson PLC. When the Penguin Group obtained the rights to children's books published by The Dial Press, some were published in paperback under the imprint Puffin Pied Piper (because Puffin has been the longtime children's imprint for the Penguin Group). Doubleday dissolved Dial Press in 1985. The adult imprint was revived by Carole Baron, the publisher of Dell, at the time part of Bantam/Doubleday/Dell, under the leadership of Susan Kamil. It went on to gain awards and bestsellers. It was bought when BDD was sold to Random House. Penguin and Random House merged in 2013, forming Penguin Random House, with the main division part of Random House and the Young Readers division part of Penguin.

== Notable books published by The Dial Press ==
- An American Dream, Norman Mailer
- Easy Street, Susan Berman
- The Detective, Roderick Thorp
- The Ecstasy Business, Richard Condon
- The Good Thief, Hannah Tinti
- I've Got Your Number, Sophie Kinsella
- Mile High, Richard Condon
- Nine Months in the Life of an Old Maid, Judith Rossner
- The Report from Iron Mountain
- The Fire Next Time, James Baldwin
- Stardance, Spider Robinson and Jeanne Robinson
- The Secret Life of Salvador Dalí, Salvador Dalí
- Die Nigger Die!, H. Rap Brown
- Ethics: Origin and Development, Peter Kropotkin
- Secrets at Sea, Richard Peck, illustrated by Kelly Murphy
- See a Heart, Share a Heart, Eric Telchin
- The Mouse with the Question Mark Tail, Richard Peck, illustrated by Kelly Murphy
- Another Country, James Baldwin
- Little Big Man, Thomas Berger
- Confessions of a Spent Youth, Vance Bourjaily
- The Giant's House, Elizabeth McCracken
- It was gonna be like Paris, Emily Listfield
- The War That Saved My Life, Kimberly Brubaker Bradley
- The Short Novels of Dostoevsky (with introduction by Thomas Mann), Fyodor Dostoevsky, translated by Constance Garnett
- The Mysterious Tale of Gentle Jack and Lord Bumblebee George Sand, illustrated by Gennady Spirin, translated by Gela Jacobson
- Strangers: A Memoir of Marriage, Belle Burden

== Book series ==
- The Bourbon Classics
- The Dial Detective Library
- The Dial Standard Library
- Fireside Library
- The Golden Dragon Library
- Library of Living Classics
- Permanent Library
- The Rogue's Library

== See also ==
- Atha Tehon, Art Director of Dial Books for Young Readers
