= Richard Peck (writer) =

American novelist (1934-2018)

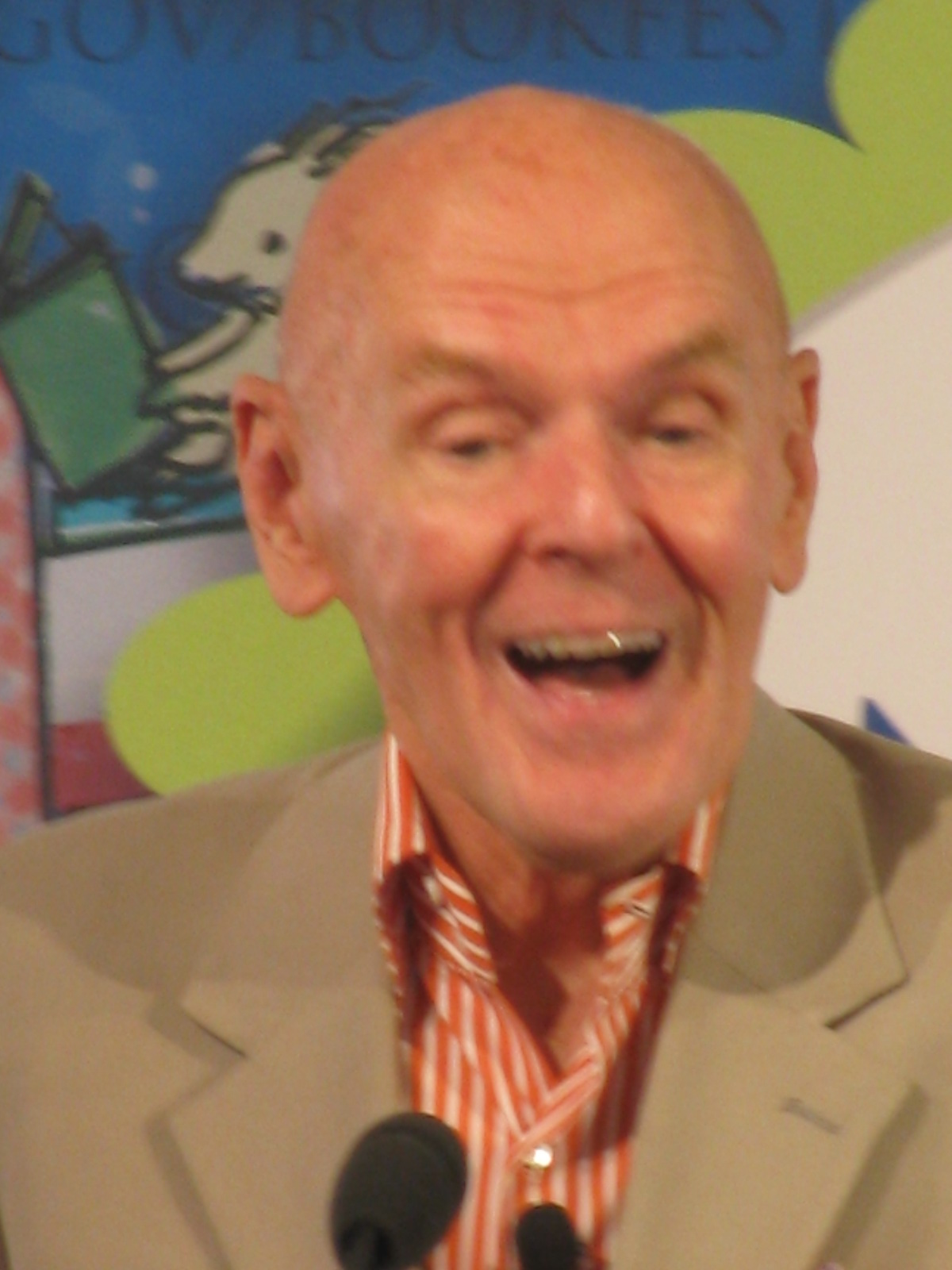
- Peck at the National Bookfest in 2013
- Born: April 10, 1934; Decatur, Illinois, U.S.
- Died: May 24, 2018 (aged 84); Manhattan, New York, U.S.
- Resting place: Graceland Cemetery, Decatur, IL
- Occupation: Writer
- Writing career
- Period: 1934–2018
- Genres: Young adult fiction, horror, mystery
- Notable awards: Edgar Award; 1977; Margaret Edwards Award; 1990; National Humanities Medal; 2001; Newbery Medal; 2001

Richard Wayne Peck (April 10, 1934 – May 23, 2018) was an American novelist known for his contributions to modern young adult literature. He was awarded the Newbery Medal in 2001 for his novel A Year Down Yonder (the sequel to A Long Way From Chicago). He received the Margaret A. Edwards Award from the American Library Association in 1990. (Note: Before 1988 the ALA awards did not distinguish "children's" literature—the Newbery book award and Wilder career award—from that for "young adults". Peck won the second biennial "Young Adult Services Division/School Library Journal Author Achievement Award", and the last one in that it was renamed and made annual that year. "1990 Margaret A. Edwards Award Winner". YALSA. ALA. Retrieved 2013-03-15.)

== Early life ==
Richard Wayne Peck was born on April 5, 1934, in Illinois. His mother was an Illinois Wesleyan University graduate, and his father owned a service station. He attended school in Decatur, Illinois.

Peck earned a bachelor's degree in English at DePauw University in 1956 and spent his junior year abroad at the University of Exeter.

After college, he was drafted into the US Army as a chaplain's assistant and spent two years serving in Stuttgart, Germany. In a 2003 interview he commented, "I think your view of the world goes on—for the rest of your life—as the world you saw as you emerged into it as an adult."

After his military service ended, he completed a master's degree at Southern Illinois University in 1959.

== Career ==
Peck worked as a high school teacher, but much to his dismay, was transferred to a junior high school to teach English. After a while, he decided to cut his career short and write. However, these observations about junior high school students proved to be inspiring material for his books. He said, "Ironically, it was my students who taught me to be a writer, though I was hired to teach them."

He left teaching in 1971 to write his first novel, Don't Look and It Won't Hurt, published by Holt, Rinehart and Winston in 1972, in which "A teenage girl struggles to understand her place within her family and in the world." He wrote a book each year since then totaling 41 books in 41 years.

Peck was an adjunct professor in Louisiana State University's School of Library and Information Sciences.

== Personal life ==
In a 2001 profile, family friend Marc Talbert described Peck as a person "who is fastidious about what he allows others to know about himself. He knew, respected, and honored personal boundaries in ways that are refreshing for someone who grew up in the sixties and seventies, when every little personal thing was fair game."

However, when The Best Man was published in 2016, Peck spoke about marriage equality in the United States from his perspective as a gay man who had grown up in a time when homosexuality was punishable by law.

He lived in New York and divided his time between writing and traveling. Peck died in New York City in May 2018 at age 84.

== Quotes ==
"Ironically, it was my students who taught me to be a writer, though I had been hired to teach them," Peck said in a speech published in Arkansas Libraries. "They taught me that a novel must entertain first before it can be anything else. I learned that there is no such thing as a 'grade reading level'; a young person's 'reading level' and attention span will rise and fall according to his degree of interest. I learned that if you do not have a happy ending for the young, you had better do some fast talking."

"Nobody, but a reader, ever became a writer."

== Writer ==
Peck wrote exclusively on a typewriter, described here in Publishers Weekly:

When the author is not traveling, he works at an L-shaped desk, which affords a sunny window. He writes everything on an electric typewriter because "it has to be a book from the first day," he explains. He has no daily routine because of all the traveling he does, but follows a very disciplined writing process. He writes each page six times, then places it in a three-ring binder with a DePauw University cover ("a talisman," he calls this memento from his alma mater). When he feels that he has gotten a page just right, he takes out another 20 words. "After a year, I've come to the end. Then I'll take this first chapter, and without rereading it, I'll throw it away and write the chapter that goes at the beginning. Because the first chapter is the last chapter in disguise." He always hands in a completed manuscript, and his editor is his first reader.

Peck refused to embrace new technology, instead choosing to type his material on a typewriter. His collected papers written between 1972 and 1991 reside at The University of Southern Mississippi.

== Death ==
Richard Peck died on May 23, 2018, at his home in New York City after a long battle with cancer.

== Film adaptations ==
- The Ghost Belonged to Me (1976), from the 1975 novel
- Are You in the House Alone? (1978 made-for-TV thriller film), from the 1976 novel
- Child of Glass (1978 TV movie), from The Ghost Belonged to Me (1975)
- Father Figure (1980), from the 1978 novel
- Gas Food Lodging (1992), from Don't Look and It Won't Hurt (1972)

== Works ==
=== Anthologies edited ===
- Edge of Awareness: 25 Contemporary Essays, eds. Ned E. Hoopes and Peck (Laurel Leaf Library, 1966)
- Sounds and Silences: Poems For Now (Delacorte Press, 1970)
- Mindscapes: Poems for the Real World (Delacorte, 1971)
- Leap Into Reality: Essays For Now (Laurel Leaf, 1973)
- Pictures That Storm Inside My Head: Poems for the Inner You (Avon Books, 1976)

=== Collections ===
- Past Perfect, Present Tense: New and Collected Stories (Dial, 2004)

=== Novels ===
Several of these books have the subtitle "a novel".

- Don't Look and It Won't Hurt (1972)
- Dreamland Lake (1973)
- Through a Brief Darkness (1973)
- Representing Super Doll (1974)
- The Ghost Belonged to Me (1975) (Note: The lifetime Edwards Award recognizes a specified body of work for "helping adolescents become aware of themselves and addressing questions about their role and importance in relationships, society, and in the world." The 1990 panel cited six of Peck's books published from 1976 to 1985: Are You in the House Alone?, The Ghost Belonged to Me, Ghosts I Have Been, Father Figure, Secrets of the Shopping Mall, and Remembering the Good Times. The librarians noted, "Through sharp wit and strong storytelling, Richard Peck's novels encourage readers to carefully examine the world around them as well as to seek possibilities beyond immediate view.") (Note: The Blossom Culp series comprises four novels published 1975 to 1986: The Ghost Belonged to Me, Ghosts I Have Been, The Dreadful Future of Blossom Culp, and Blossom Culp and the Sleep of Death. See ISFDB.)
- Are You in the House Alone? (1976)
- Ghosts I Have Been (1977)
- Monster Night at Grandma's House, illus. Don Freeman (1977)
- Father Figure (1978)
- Secrets of the Shopping Mall (1979)
- Amanda/Miranda (1980)
- Close Enough to Touch (1981)
- New York Time
- The Dreadful Future of Blossom Culp (1983)
- This Family of Women (1983)
- Remembering the Good Times (1985)
- Blossom Culp and the Sleep of Death (1986)
- Princess Ashley (1987)
- Those Summer Girls I Never Met (1988)
- Voices After Midnight (1989)
- Unfinished Portrait of Jessica (1991)
- Bel-Air Bambi and the Mall Rats (1993)
- Lost in Cyberspace! (1995)
- The Last Safe Place on Earth (1995)
- The Great Interactive Dream Machine: Another Adventure in Cyberspace (1996)
- London Holiday (1998)
- A Long Way from Chicago (1998)
- Strays Like Us (1998)
- A Year Down Yonder (2000)
- Fair Weather (2001)
- The River Between Us (2003)
- The Teacher's Funeral: A Comedy in Three Parts (2004)
- Here Lies The Librarian (2006)
- On the Wings of Heroes (2007)
- A Season of Gifts, illus. Brandon Dorman (2009)
- Three Quarters Dead (2010)
- Secrets at Sea, illus. Kelly Murphy (2011)
- The Mouse with the Question Mark Tail, illus. Kelly Murphy (2013)
- The Best Man (2016)

=== Nonfiction ===
- Consumer's guide to educational innovations, Mortimer Smith, Peck, and George Weber (Washington: Council for Basic Education, 1972)
- The Creative Word, Vol. 2, Peck and Stephen N. Judy (Random House English series, Random House Schoolbook Division, 1973)
- Transitions: a literary paper casebook (Random House English, 1974)
- Urban Studies: a research paper casebook (Random House English, 1974)
- Housing and Local Government: a research guide for policy-makers and planners, Harry J. Wexler and Peck (Lexington, MA: Lexington Books, 1975)
- Write a Tale of Terror (O'Fallon, MO: Book Lures, 1987; ISBN 0913839604)
- Anonymously Yours (Englewood Cliffs, NJ: J. Messner, 1991), autobiography
- Love and Death at the Mall: Teaching and Writing for the Literate Young (Delacorte, 1994)
- Invitations to the World: Teaching and Writing for the Young (Dial, 2002)

== Awards and honors ==
- 1990: Margaret A. Edwards Award for "significant and lasting contributions to young adult literature"
- 1990: ALAN Award, from The Assembly on Literature for Adolescents, for "outstanding contributions to the field of adolescent literature"
- 1991: The University of Southern Mississippi Medallion for "outstanding contributions to the field of children's literature"
- 2001: National Humanities Medal
- 2004: Jeremiah Ludington Memorial Award, from the Educational Paperback Association, for "significant contribution to the educational paperback business"

=== Book awards ===
- 1977: Edgar Allan Poe Award, Best Juvenile, Are You in the House Alone?
- 2001: Newbery Medal, A Year Down Yonder
- 2004 Scott O'Dell Award for Historical Fiction The River Between Us

Other book recognition

- 1974: Edgar Award nominee, Best Juvenile, Dreamland Lake
- 1999: National Book Award finalist and Newbery Medal Honor Book, A Long Way from Chicago
- 2017: Boston Globe–Horn Book Award Fiction and Poetry Honor Book, The Best Man
