= Deaths in May 2018 =

The following is a list of notable deaths in May 2018.

Entries for each day are listed alphabetically by surname. A typical entry lists information in the following sequence:

- Name, age, country of citizenship at birth, subsequent country of citizenship (if applicable), reason for notability, cause of death (if known), and reference.

== May 2018 ==
=== 1 ===
- Javier Aller, 46, Spanish actor (The Biggest Robbery Never Told, Mortadelo & Filemon: The Big Adventure, The Miracle of P. Tinto), complications from diabetes.
- Elmar Altvater, 79, German political scientist.
- Arthur Barnard, 89, American sprinter and Olympic bronze medalist (1952).
- Max Berrú, 74, Ecuadorian-Chilean musician (Inti Illimani).
- Dennis Claridge, 76, American football player (Green Bay Packers, Atlanta Falcons), bladder cancer.
- Ninalee Craig, 90, American-born Canadian teacher and photograph subject, complications from lung cancer.
- Carl W. Duckworth, 63, American politician, member of the Utah House of Representatives (1999–2008), bone cancer.
- Raymond D. Dzendzel, 96, American politician, member of the Michigan House of Representatives (1955–1958) and Senate (1959–1970).
- Reg Gadney, 77, British author.
- Phil Gowan, 65, American historian (RMS Titanic), cancer.
- Robert B. Kennedy, 78, American politician, member of the Massachusetts House of Representatives (1975–1979) and Governor's Council (1989–1995), Mayor of Lowell (1986–1987).
- Alfred Macyk, 94, Canadian politician.
- Chuck Missler, 83, American evangelist and author.
- Ashok Mitra, 90, Indian economist and politician.
- Pavel Pergl, 40, Czech footballer (Sparta Prague), suicide by hanging.
- Dan Rogas, 91, American football player (Detroit Lions, Philadelphia Eagles).
- Bozor Sobir, 79, Tajikistani poet and politician, lung disease.
- Jabo Starks, 79, American drummer (James Brown, The J.B.'s).
- Charlie Stone, 67, English rugby league footballer (Hull F.C., Featherstone Rovers).
- Sun Yueh, 87, Chinese-born Taiwanese actor (Papa, Can You Hear Me Sing), sepsis.
- Peter Temple-Morris, Baron Temple-Morris, 80, British politician and life peer, MP for Leominster (1974–2001).
- Universo 2000, 55, Mexican professional wrestler (CMLL, AAA, IWRG).
- Wanda Wiłkomirska, 89, Polish violinist and teacher.
- Bob Woffinden, 70, British journalist and author, mesothelioma.
- Betty Workman, 93, American politician, member of the Maryland House of Delegates (1987–1999).

=== 2 ===
- Gord Brown, 57, Canadian politician, MP (since 2004), heart attack.
- Roy Burns, 82, American drummer.
- Tony Cucchiara, 80, Italian singer and songwriter.
- Paul Dick, 77, Canadian politician, heart attack.
- Dick Edell, 74, American lacrosse coach (Maryland Terrapins), pneumonia.
- János Juszkó, 78, Hungarian Olympic racing cyclist (1964).
- Satoshi Kako, 92, Japanese author and illustrator, renal failure.
- Herman Krebbers, 94, Dutch violinist.
- Tokay Mammadov, 90, Azerbaijani sculptor.
- Gerald J. Morrissey, 90, American politician.
- Vadim Mulerman, 79, Soviet singer, cancer.
- Katherine O'Regan, 71, New Zealand politician, MP for Waipa (1984–1996), list MP (1996–1999), cancer.
- Kottayam Pushpanath, 80, Indian author.
- Harald Range, 70, German jurist, Attorney General (2011–2015).
- James Thorp, 81, American electrical engineer.
- Finn Tøraasen, 81, Norwegian footballer (Skeid).
- Bill Torrey, 83, Canadian ice hockey executive (New York Islanders, Florida Panthers).
- Wolfgang Völz, 87, German actor.
- Chris Walsh, 66, American politician, member of the Massachusetts House of Representatives (since 2010), lymphoma.
- Wang Danfeng, 93, Chinese actress.
- Cliff Watson, 78, English rugby league footballer (St Helens, Cronulla-Sutherland, national team), cancer.
- Sir Keith Williamson, 90, British air force commander, Chief of the Air Staff (1982–1985).
- Katsuhiro Yamaguchi, 90, Japanese artist and art theorist.

=== 3 ===
- Jim Argue, 66, American politician, member of the Arkansas Senate (1996–2008), kidney cancer.
- Monica Barnes, 82, Irish politician, Teachta Dála (1982–1992, 1997–2002), Senator (1982).
- Pete Barnes, 72, American football player (San Diego Chargers, St. Louis Cardinals, New England Patriots), complications from Alzheimer's disease.
- Patricia L. Birkholz, 74, American politician.
- Davida Coady, 80, American pediatrician, ovarian cancer.
- H. Basil S. Cooke, 102, South African-Canadian geologist and palaeontologist.
- Doina Cornea, 88, Romanian human rights activist and professor.
- Afonso Dhlakama, 65, Mozambican politician and opposition leader (RENAMO), heart attack.
- Cliff Downey, 89, Canadian politician, MP (1968–1972).
- Dan Grimm, 77, American football player (Green Bay Packers, Atlanta Falcons), complications from Parkinson's disease and dementia.
- John Hinnells, 76, British theologian.
- György Holovits, 71, Hungarian Olympic sailor.
- David Pines, 93, American physicist.
- Bob Prewitt, 93, American college basketball coach (SMU Mustangs).
- Junior Rodriguez, 82, American politician.
- Joe Scannella, 89, American football coach (Oakland Raiders, Montreal Alouettes, Cleveland Browns).
- Paolo Signorelli, 79, Italian footballer.
- Edward Wasiolek, 94, American literary scholar.
- Demetrio Túpac Yupanqui, 94, Peruvian academic and Quechua translator.

=== 4 ===
- Paul Bloodgood, 58, American artist, Alzheimer's disease.
- Edwin G. Burrows, 74, American historian and professor (Brooklyn College).
- Naser Cheshmazar, 67, Iranian composer, heart attack.
- Renate Dorrestein, 64, Dutch writer and journalist, esophageal cancer.
- Cathy Godbold, 43, Australian actress (The Saddle Club, Home and Away), brain cancer.
- Bobbie Louise Hawkins, 87, American poet and author.
- Larry Hunter, 68, American college basketball coach (Wittenberg Tigers, Ohio Bobcats, Western Carolina Catamounts), complications from a stroke.
- B. N. Vijaya Kumar, 59, Indian politician, heart attack.
- Lionel Lamy, 74, French footballer (Laval).
- Patricia Lascelles, Countess of Harewood, 91, Australian-British violinist and fashion model.
- André Le Dissez, 88, French racing cyclist.
- Juan Morano, 76, Spanish politician, member of the Congress of Deputies (2004–2015), mayor of León (1979–1987, 1989–1995).
- Luyanda Ntshangase, 21, South African footballer (Maritzburg United), lightning strike.
- Abi Ofarim, 80, Israeli musician ("Cinderella Rockefella") and dancer.
- Alf O'Rear, 95, American politician.
- Tony Steel, 76, New Zealand rugby union player (national team) and politician, MP for Hamilton East (1990–1993, 1996–2002).
- Kenneth J. Thorneycroft, 90, Canadian military officer.
- Alexander Tschäppät, 66, Swiss politician, National Councillor (1979–1991, 2011–2018), Mayor of Bern (2005–2016), cancer.

=== 5 ===
- Michele Castoro, 66, Italian Roman Catholic prelate, Archbishop of Manfredonia-Vieste-S.Giovanni Rotondo (since 2009), cancer.
- Klaus Dede, 82, German writer and journalist.
- Frederic H. Dustin, 88, American businessman and philanthropist.
- Stanley Falkow, 84, American microbiologist.
- Wilson Frost, 92, American politician, member of the Chicago City Council (1967–1987).
- Arjun Hingorani, 92, Indian film producer and director (Dil Bhi Tera Hum Bhi Tere, Kab? Kyoon? Aur Kahan?, Katilon Ke Kaatil).
- José María Íñigo, 75, Spanish journalist (RTVE) and commentator (Eurovision Song Contest), cancer.
- John Kinsella, English gang member, shot.
- Séamus Lagan, 71, Northern Irish Gaelic footballer.
- Lambert Maassen, 76, Dutch footballer (PSV Eindhoven, ADO Den Haag).
- Ermanno Olmi, 86, Italian film director and screenwriter (Il Posto, The Tree of Wooden Clogs, The Legend of the Holy Drinker), complications from Guillain–Barré syndrome.
- Aaron D. Panken, 53, American rabbi, President of the Hebrew Union College-Jewish Institute of Religion (since 2014), plane crash.
- Fuad Poladov, 69, Azerbaijani actor.
- Aimo Pulkkinen, 89, Finnish footballer.
- P. N. Sathya, 46, Indian actor and director (Majestic).
- Rosemarie Schuder, 89, German writer.
- Ron Scott, 70, Scottish football journalist (The Sunday Post).
- Dick Williams, 91, American singer (The Williams Brothers).
- Roy Wright, 84, American baseball player (New York Giants).

=== 6 ===
- Sam Aanestad, 71, American politician, member of the California State Assembly (1998–2002) and Senate (2002–2010).
- Cirilo Bautista, 76, Filipino writer and poet.
- Raymond Book, 93, American politician, member of the Pennsylvania House of Representatives (1983–1989).
- Herbert E. Brekle, 82, German typographer and linguist.
- Dick Casull, 87, American gunsmith.
- Jack Chamangwana, 61, Malawian football player and coach.
- Daniel Cohen, 82, American writer, sepsis.
- Ivan Dagnin, 80, South African cricketer.
- Arun Date, 84, Indian singer.
- Jean-Claude Decagny, 78, French politician, MP (1993–2010), Mayor of Maubeuge (1984–1989, 1995–2001).
- Leonard Faulkner, 91, Australian Roman Catholic prelate, Archbishop of Adelaide (1985–2001).
- Paolo Ferrari, 89, Belgian-born Italian actor, voice actor and television presenter (Susanna Whipped Cream, White Voices, Lo scippo).
- Eric Geboers, 55, Belgian motocross racer, five-time world champion, drowned.
- Tarcisio Gitti, 82, Italian politician, President of Brescia province (1972–1975) and deputy (1979–1994).
- Gurukrushna Goswami, 83, Indian lyricist.
- George G. Hall, 93, British applied mathematician.
- Lai Meng, 89, Malaysian actress.
- David Mitchell, 84, Australian lawyer and missionary.
- Khaled Mohieddin, 95, Egyptian military officer, member of the Revolutionary Command Council.
- Jamal Naji, 63, Jordanian author, stroke.
- Ruth Richard, 89, American baseball player (Rockford Peaches).
- Derek Riley, 95, Canadian Olympic rower (1952).
- Charles W. Steger, 70, American academic, President of Virginia Tech (2000–2014).
- Brad Steiger, 82, American author and paranormal researcher.
- Ray Szmanda, 91, American radio personality and Menards spokesman (1976–2002).
- Scott Wilson, 67, American bodybuilder, skin cancer.

=== 7 ===
- Andreas Findig, 56, Austrian author.
- Mikhail German, 85, Russian writer.
- Joan Groothuysen, 60, Canadian Olympic cross-country skier (1976, 1980), cancer.
- Thomas Hempel, 76, Swedish radio journalist (Dagens Eko).
- Søren Hyldgaard, 55, Danish composer (Red), diabetes.
- Jesús Kumate Rodríguez, 93, Mexican physician and politician, Secretary of Health (1988–1994).
- Maurane, 57, Belgian singer and actress.
- Miki Muster, 92, Slovenian artist.
- César Paredes Canto, 76, Peruvian academic and politician, Vice President (1995–2000), heart attack.
- Isyaku Rabiu, 92, Nigerian businessman and Islamic scholar.
- Charlie Russell, 76, Canadian naturalist, complications from surgery.
- Jeremy D. Safran, 66, Canadian-born American psychotherapist, beaten and stabbed.
- Crosbie E. Saint, 81, American military officer.
- António Saraiva, 84, Portuguese footballer (Caldas, Benfica).
- Gayle Shepherd, 81, American singer (Shepherd Sisters), dementia.
- Roman Toi, 101, Estonian-Canadian composer, choir conductor and organist.
- Tore Torell, 76, Norwegian magician, esophageal cancer.
- Miroslav Vardić, 73, Serbian footballer (Hajduk Split, Helmond Sport).

=== 8 ===
- John Bonvillian, 69, American psychologist.
- Big Bully Busick, 63, American professional wrestler (WWF), spinal fluid cancer.
- Anne V. Coates, 92, British film editor (Lawrence of Arabia, The Elephant Man, Fifty Shades of Grey), Oscar winner (1963).
- George Deukmejian, 89, American politician, Governor of California (1983–1991).
- Marta DuBois, 65, Panamanian actress (Magnum, P.I.).
- Peter Fehlner, 86, American Roman Catholic priest and theologian.
- Eunice Groark, 80, American politician, Lieutenant Governor of Connecticut (1991–1995).
- Mahmoud Hammoud, 82–83, Lebanese politician and diplomat.
- Larry Leach, 81, Canadian ice hockey player (Boston Bruins).
- Ernest Medina, 81, American army officer, commander of unit responsible for the My Lai Massacre.
- Lara Saint Paul, 73, Eritrean-born Italian singer, cancer.
- James Scott, 71, American light-heavyweight boxer and convicted murderer.
- Al Stanek, 74, American baseball player (San Francisco Giants).
- Jonathan Sternberg, 98, American conductor and musical director, heart failure.
- Rauf Talyshinski, 61, Azerbaijani journalist and editor.
- Don Testerman, 65, American football player (Seattle Seahawks, Miami Dolphins), dementia.
- Frøystein Wedervang, 100, Norwegian economist.
- Cliff Wirth, 91, American cartoonist (Chicago Sun-Times).

=== 9 ===
- Dino Adriano, 75, British businessman (J Sainsbury).
- Tessa Beaver, 86, British artist.
- Poldine Carlo, 97, American writer and Koyukon elder.
- Lolita Chatterjee, 81, Indian actress, stroke.
- Shirley Danz, 91, American baseball player (Chicago Colleens, Racine Belles).
- Omar Daoud, 35, Libyan footballer (Al Ahli SC, JS Kabylie, national team), traffic collision.
- Jean Dickey, 72, American physicist.
- Tom Dooley, 83, American football referee.
- Arthur Fitzsimons, 88, Irish football player (Middlesbrough) and manager.
- Tom Fletcher, 75, American baseball player (Detroit Tigers).
- Abiyi Ford, 83, Ethiopian-born American film educator and filmmaker.
- Tony Gallegos, 94, American businessman and politician.
- Richard Haag, 94, American landscape architect.
- Shimako Murai, 89, Japanese playwright.
- Mustafa Nur-Ul Islam, 91, Bangladeshi academic, National Professor (2011).
- Per Kirkeby, 79, Danish artist.
- Tan Duc Thanh Nguyen, 34, Australian heroin smuggler (Bali Nine), stomach cancer.
- Rajinder Pal, 80, Indian cricketer.
- Hamp Swain, 88, American disc jockey.
- Carlos Enrique Trinidad Gómez, 63, Guatemalan Roman Catholic prelate, Bishop of San Marcos (since 2014).

=== 10 ===
- Ann Bergren, 75, American literature and architecture scholar.
- Karl Bergström, 81, Swedish Olympic boxer (1960).
- Graham Bunyard, 78, South African cricketer (Transvaal, Rhodesia).
- Berenice A. Carroll, 85, American political scientist and activist.
- Ankit Chadha, 30, Indian storyteller, drowned.
- Liz Chase, 68, Zimbabwean field hockey player, Olympic champion (1980).
- Donnie Forman, 92, American basketball player (Minneapolis Lakers).
- Tony Gilmore, 68, Australian rules footballer (Geelong).
- David Goodall, 104, English-born Australian botanist, assisted suicide by lethal injection.
- John T. Gosling, 79, American physicist, cancer.
- Emile Gumbs, 90, Anguillan politician, Chief Minister (1977–1980, 1984–1994).
- Harold Guskin, 76, American acting coach, pulmonary embolism.
- Günther Haensch, 95, German linguist and lexicographer.
- Ken Hodgkisson, 85, English footballer (Walsall, West Bromwich Albion).
- Scott Hutchison, 36, Scottish singer, songwriter and guitarist (Frightened Rabbit, Mastersystem, The Fruit Tree Foundation).
- Kevin Kamenetz, 60, American politician, Baltimore County Executive (since 2010), cardiac arrest.
- Graham Lovett, 70, English footballer (West Bromwich Albion).
- Alfonso Lovo Cordero, 90, Nicaraguan politician, member of the Liberal-Conservative Junta (1972–1974).
- Josue Marquez, 71, Puerto Rican boxer, renal failure.
- John Campbell Munro, 70, Scottish-Australian folk singer, cancer.
- Neelu, 81, Indian actor.
- Don Oslear, 89, English cricket umpire, complications from Parkinson's disease.
- Adam Parfrey, 61, American writer, editor and publisher (Feral House), complications from several strokes.
- Joseph Paul, 81, Pakistani Roman Catholic priest.
- Maynard Troyer, 79, American race car driver and race chassis engineer.
- Evgeni Vasiukov, 85, Russian chess Grandmaster.
- The Wanderer, 59, Norwegian serial burglar.
- Wu Dechang, 90, Chinese toxicologist, President of the Academy of Military Medical Sciences.

=== 11 ===
- Mikhail Alperin, 61, Ukrainian-born Norwegian jazz pianist.
- Tony Beers, 55, Australian footballer (Collingwood, Claremont).
- Bob Bonnett, 85, Australian footballer (Port Melbourne).
- Zlatko Bourek, 88, Croatian filmmaker.
- Anita Das, 66, Indian actress, heart attack.
- Gérard Genette, 87, French literary theorist.
- Josh Greenfeld, 90, American author and screenwriter (Harry and Tonto), pneumonia.
- Hugo Guerra, 52, Uruguayan footballer (national team, Boca Juniors, Club de Gimnasia y Esgrima La Plata), heart attack.
- Rod Jellema, 91, American poet.
- Merv Lees, 85, Australian rugby footballer.
- Tom E. Lewis, 59, Australian Yan-nhaŋu actor (The Chant of Jimmie Blacksmith, Red Hill), heart attack.
- Peter Mayer, 82, American publisher (The Overlook Press, Penguin Books), complications from amyloidosis.
- Bengt Nilsson, 84, Swedish Olympic high jumper (1956).
- Jose Francisco Oliveros, 71, Filipino Roman Catholic prelate, Bishop of Malolos (since 2004).
- Himanshu Roy, 54, Indian police officer, Director General of Police for Maharashtra, suicide by gunshot.
- Ulla Sallert, 95, Swedish actress and singer.
- Viktor Shamburkin, 86, Russian sport shooter, Olympic gold medalist (1960).
- Germain Van der Moere, 93, Belgian Olympic sprint canoeist (1956, 1960), world champion (1958).

=== 12 ===
- Mansoor Ahmed, 50, Pakistani field hockey player, Olympic bronze medalist (1992), heart failure.
- Will Alsop, 70, British architect, Stirling Prize winner (2000).
- Eddy Bandura, 77, German footballer (Hannover 96).
- Billy Brewer, 83, American football player and coach (Ole Miss Rebels, Southeastern Louisiana, Louisiana Tech).
- Florence Buhr, 85, American politician.
- Nick Drahos, 99, American football player (Cornell Big Red), pneumonia.
- Jim Dunaway, 76, American football player (Buffalo Bills, Miami Dolphins).
- Eufranio Eriguel, 58, Filipino physician and politician, Mayor of Agoo (1998–2007) shot.
- Vern Harper, 81, Canadian Cree elder and indigenous rights activist.
- Geoffrey Hendricks, 86, American artist.
- Tessa Jowell, Baroness Jowell, 70, English politician, Secretary of State for Culture, Media and Sport (2001–2007), MP (1992–2015) and peer (since 2015), brain cancer.
- Chuck Knox, 86, American football coach (Los Angeles Rams, Buffalo Bills, Seattle Seahawks), dementia.
- Antonio Mercero, 82, Spanish film and television director (Verano azul, Farmacia de guardia, La cabina), Emmy (1972) and Goya (2010) winner, complications from Alzheimer's disease.
- Borislav Mikelić, 78, Serbian politician, Prime Minister of Serbian Krajina (1994–1995).
- Dennis Nilsen, 72, Scottish serial killer.
- Sam Nzima, 83, South African photographer.
- Jack Sures, 83, Canadian artist.
- Charles Thake, 90, Maltese actor (Agora, Treasure in Malta).
- Joe Thomson, 70, Scottish legal scholar, Regius Professor of Law (Glasgow) (1991–2005).
- Kevin Tierney, 67, Canadian film producer (Bon Cop, Bad Cop, The Trotsky) and journalist (Montreal Gazette), cancer.
- R. Jay Turner, 83, American sociologist and epidemiologist.
- Earl W. Wallace, 75, American screenwriter (Witness).
- Gareth Williams, 63, British rugby union player (Wales, British and Irish Lions).
- D. Gary Young, 68, American business executive, founder of Young Living, complications from multiple strokes.

=== 13 ===
- Edgardo Angara, 83, Filipino politician, Senator (1987–1998, 2001–2013), Senate President (1993–1995) and Minister of Agriculture (1991–2005), heart attack.
- Balkavi Bairagi, 87, Indian poet and politician.
- Rajab Ali Khan Baloch, 48, Pakistani politician, member of the National Assembly (since 2013), cancer.
- Rogelio Blaín, 73, Cuban actor (Lucía).
- Glenn Branca, 69, American avant-garde composer (The Ascension) and guitarist (Theoretical Girls), throat cancer.
- Epitácio Cafeteira, 93, Brazilian politician, Senator from Maranhão (2007–2015) and Governor (1987–1990).
- Beth Chatto, 94, British gardener (Beth Chatto Gardens) and writer.
- John Fielding Crigler, 98, American pediatrician.
- Clare Drake, 89, Canadian ice hockey coach (Alberta Golden Bears, Edmonton Oilers).
- Donald T. Farley, 84, American physicist and engineering scientist.
- Paul Harris, 92, American sculptor and lithographer.
- Steve Hogan, 69, American politician, Mayor of Aurora, Colorado (since 2011), member of the Colorado House of Representatives (1975–1976), cancer.
- Margot Kidder, 69, Canadian-American actress (Superman, The Amityville Horror, Black Christmas) and activist, suicide by drug and alcohol overdose.
- Ken Mills, 83, British chemist.
- Chuck Panama, 93, American publicist (20th Century Fox) and journalist (Daily Bruin).
- James F. Short Jr., 93, American sociologist and criminologist.
- Harry Stiller, 79, British racing driver, British Formula Three champion (1966, 1967).
- Tommy Todd, 90, American politician.
- Baadur Tsuladze, 83, Georgian actor, film director, writer and broadcaster.
- Lucien Villa, 95, French politician, Deputy (1967–1968, 1973–1981).

=== 14 ===
- Kalasala Babu, 68, Indian actor, complications from a stroke.
- Howard Bayne, 75, American basketball player (Kentucky Colonels).
- James B. Beard, 82, American horticultural scientist.
- T. P. Burns, 94, Irish jockey.
- Peter Byrne, 90, English actor (Dixon of Dock Green) and director.
- Mike Drass, 57, American football coach (Wesley College), heart attack.
- Elaine Edwards, 89, American politician, U.S. Senator (1972) and First Lady of Louisiana (1972–1980, 1984–1988).
- Abdulrahim Abby Farah, 98, Welsh-born Somali diplomat and politician.
- Roberto Farias, 86, Brazilian film director, producer and screenwriter (Pra Frente, Brasil), cancer.
- Doug Ford, 95, American golfer, PGA (1955) and Masters champion (1957).
- Amir Ganiel, 55, Israeli swimmer.
- John James, 79, British poet.
- Vladimír Jirásek, 84, Czech slalom canoeist, multi-ICF world champion.
- Dieter Kunzelmann, 78, German political activist.
- María Elena Meneses Rocha, 56, Mexican journalist, technologist and academic (Monterrey Institute of Technology and Higher Education).
- Kamel Omrane, 67, Tunisian politician and academic, Minister of Religious Affairs (2010–2011).
- Luis Pellicer, 87, Spanish footballer (Lérida, Sporting de Gijón, Málaga).
- Frank Quilici, 79, American baseball player, manager and commentator (Minnesota Twins), kidney disease.
- Mani Shah, 51, Nepalese footballer.
- E. C. George Sudarshan, 86, Indian theoretical physicist and professor (University of Texas at Austin).
- William Vance, 82, Belgian comics artist (XIII, Bob Morane, Bruno Brazil), Parkinson's disease.
- Tom Wolfe, 88, American author (The Bonfire of the Vanities, The Right Stuff, The Electric Kool-Aid Acid Test) and journalist, infection.
- Jozef J. Zwislocki, 96, Polish-born American neuroscientist.

=== 15 ===
- Balakumaran, 71, Indian writer.
- Akki Chennabasappa, Indian actor.
- Joseph G. Clemons, 90, American soldier, subject of Pork Chop Hill.
- Bill Hachten, 93, American football player (New York Giants).
- Derek Harrison, 74, British Olympic cyclist (1964).
- Martin Hoffman, 88, Czech-born British bridge player, writer and Holocaust survivor.
- Ralph Jecha, 86, American football player (Chicago Bears, Pittsburgh Steelers).
- Wilson Chisala Kalumba, 53-54, Zambian politician, Mayor of Lusaka (since 2016), heart failure.
- Jean-Claude Lamy, 76, French journalist.
- José Lavat, 69, Mexican voice actor, renal failure.
- Milan Malatinský, 48, Slovak football player (Spartak Trnava, FK Inter Bratislava) and manager (national under-19 team), train collision.
- Tom Murphy, 83, Irish playwright (A Whistle in the Dark, Conversations on a Homecoming).
- Barbara Nawrocka-Dońska, 93, Polish journalist and feminist essayist.
- Elyas Omar, 81, Malaysian politician, Mayor of Kuala Lumpur (1981–1992), heart disease.
- Hirohito Ōta, 48, Japanese freelance writer.
- Jlloyd Samuel, 37, Trinidadian footballer (Aston Villa, Bolton Wanderers), traffic collision.
- Georges Scandar, 91, Lebanese Maronite Catholic hierarch, Bishop of Baalbek and Zahleh (1977–1990) and Zahleh (1990–2002).
- Austin Thomas, 79, Aruban Olympic fencer (1988).

=== 16 ===
- François Bréda, 62, Romanian writer and literary critic.
- Joseph Campanella, 93, American actor (Mannix, Days of Our Lives, The St. Valentine's Day Massacre), complications from Parkinson's disease.
- Nick Coleman, 67, American journalist (Star Tribune), stroke.
- Hugh Dane, 75, American actor (The Office, Bridesmaids, Joy Ride), pancreatic cancer.
- Richard Fork, 82, American physicist, respiratory arrest.
- Nils Foss, 90, Danish civil engineer (Foss A/S), Parkinson's disease.
- Camille Gira, 59, Luxembourgish politician and ecologist, State Secretary for Sustainable Development and Infrastructure (since 2013), member of the Chamber of Deputies (1994-2013), Mayor of Beckerich (1990-2013), heart attack.
- Elena Gremina, 61, Russian scriptwriter, director and playwright, heart attack.
- Miriam T. Griffin, 82, American academic (Somerville College).
- Tom Hadfield, 83, New Zealand rugby league player (Auckland, national team).
- Yuriko Hoshi, 74, Japanese actress (Mothra vs. Godzilla, Kill!, Ghidorah, the Three-Headed Monster).
- Russell Jessop, 60, Australian footballer (Collingwood).
- Andy Johnson, 65, American football player (New England Patriots).
- Gérard Jouannest, 85, French pianist.
- Eloísa Mafalda, 93, Brazilian actress (Gabriela, Por Amor, O Beijo do Vampiro).
- Salih Mirzabeyoğlu, 68, Turkish writer and Islamist leader (Great Eastern Islamic Raiders' Front), brain hemorrhage.
- Diana E. Murphy, 84, American judge, U.S. Court of Appeals for the 8th Circuit (1994–2016), U.S. District Court for the District of Minnesota (1980–1994).
- Lucian Pintilie, 84, Romanian film director (The Reenactment, An Unforgettable Summer, Next Stop Paradise).
- Hideki Saijo, 63, Japanese singer, heart failure.
- Michael Slive, 77, American college athletics commissioner (Conference USA, Southeastern Conference).
- Bill Smyly, 95, British WWII army officer and journalist.
- Ray Wilson, 83, English footballer (Huddersfield Town, Everton, national team), world champion (1966), Alzheimer's disease.
- Zhao Kangmin, 81, Chinese archaeologist, discovered the Terracotta Army.

=== 17 ===
- Ezio Barbieri, 95, Italian criminal.
- Inger Brattström, 97, Swedish writer.
- Grover Connell, 100, American businessman.
- Sir James Eberle, 90, British Royal Navy Admiral, Commander-in-Chief Fleet (1979–1981).
- Skip Finn, 69, American Ojibwe politician, member of the Minnesota Senate (1991–1996).
- Nicole Fontaine, 76, French lawyer and politician, President of the European Parliament (1999–2002).
- Craig Harbison, 74, American art historian.
- Jim Hay, 87, Canadian ice hockey player (Detroit Red Wings).
- Murray Hofmeyr, 92, South African cricketer and rugby player.
- Lawrence Jegen, 83, American legal scholar.
- Lee Young-hee, 82, South Korean hanbok fashion designer, pneumonia.
- Bill Longmore, 79, British civil servant, West Mercia Police and Crime Commissioner (2012–2016), cancer.
- Maciej Maciejewski, 103, Polish actor.
- Jürgen Marcus, 69, German singer ("Chansons pour ceux qui s'aiment"), COPD.
- Anthony Michael Milone, 85, American Roman Catholic prelate, Bishop of Great Falls-Billings (1988–2006), cancer and heart disease.
- Vera Nikodem, 78, Czech-born American molecular biologist, acute myeloid leukemia.
- Richard Pipes, 94, Polish-born American historian (Team B) and professor (Harvard University).
- Mait Riisman, 61, Estonian water polo player, Olympic gold medalist (1980).
- Jon Sholle, 70, American musician.
- Tom Von Ruden, 73, American Olympic athlete (1968).
- Mehdi Tabatabaei, 82, Iranian Shia cleric and politician, MP (1984–1988, 2004–2008), lung disease.

=== 18 ===
- Stephanie Adams, 47, American model (Playboy, Clairol, Venus Swimwear) and author, suicide by jumping.
- Rolande Allard-Lacerte, 88, Canadian journalist and writer.
- John Ashdown-Hill, 69, British archaeologist, motor neurone disease.
- Doğan Babacan, 88, Turkish football referee.
- Sir John Carrick, 99, Australian politician, Minister for Education (1975–1979).
- Darío Castrillón Hoyos, 88, Colombian Roman Catholic cardinal, Archbishop of Bucaramanga (1992–1996), Prefect of the Congregation for the Clergy (1996–2006) and President of the Pontifical Commission Ecclesia Dei (2000–2009), liver disease.
- Iyad Futayyih, 76, Iraqi military officer and convicted criminal, stroke.
- Christopher Jones, 82, Irish Roman Catholic prelate, Bishop of Elphin (1994–2014).
- Antonio Lupatelli, 88, Italian illustrator, writer and comics artist (Pingu, The Woodland Folk).
- Eric McLuhan, 76, Canadian communications theorist and media ecologist.
- Dilshad Najmuddin, 80–81, Pakistani police officer.
- Donald F. Oliver, 63, American politician.
- Liam Ó Muirthile, 68, Irish poet.
- Fred Peters, 95, American animator and comics artist (Pluto, EC Comics).
- Lance Poimboeuf, 77, American football player (Dallas Cowboys).
- Jack Reilly, 86, American jazz pianist.
- Sir Des Champs, 11, Irish racehorse, race injury.
- Yrsa Stenius, 73, Finnish-born Swedish journalist.
- Sun Fuling, 96, Chinese business executive and politician, Vice Mayor of Beijing (1983–1993), Vice Chairman of the Chinese People's Political Consultative Conference (1993–2003).
- Philip Tabane, 84, South African musician.
- Troy Waters, 53, Australian light middleweight boxer, Commonwealth champion (1987–1991), acute myeloid leukaemia.

=== 19 ===
- John Avery, 90, Australian police officer, Commissioner of the New South Wales Police (1984–1991).
- Eddy C. Bertin, 73, Belgian author.
- William Burrus, 81, American labor union leader, heart failure.
- Joseph Cassar, 71, Maltese diplomat, United Nations representative and Ambassador to Portugal, Italy, Libya and Russia.
- Rosine Faugouin, 87, French Olympic sprinter.
- Michael Goldstein, 79, American music publicist and journalist.
- Harvey Hall, 77, American businessman and politician, Mayor of Bakersfield, California (2001–2017).
- Barry Hindess, 78, British sociologist.
- Robert Indiana, 89, American pop artist (Love), respiratory failure.
- Houmane Jarir, 73, Moroccan footballer (national team, Raja Casablanca).
- Maya Jribi, 58, Tunisian politician, cancer.
- Bernard Lewis, 101, British-born American Middle East historian and professor (Princeton University).
- Arvi Liimatainen, 68, Finnish-born Canadian television producer (Da Vinci's Inquest, Hiccups, Gracepoint), cancer.
- Reggie Lucas, 65, American songwriter ("Never Knew Love Like This Before"), guitarist (Miles Davis) and record producer (Madonna), Grammy winner (1981), heart failure.
- Vincent McEveety, 88, American film and television director (Firecreek, The Castaway Cowboy, Herbie Goes to Monte Carlo).
- Thomas McGhee, 89, English footballer (Portsmouth, Reading).
- John Moorfield, 74, New Zealand Māori language academic, cancer.
- Eric Murray, 89, Canadian bridge player.
- Giovanni Pace, 84, Italian politician, deputy (1994–2001) and President of Abruzzo (2000–2005).
- Hardy Rodenstock, 76, German wine collector and dealer.
- Ernst Sieber, 91, Swiss pastor, founder of Sozialwerke Pfarrer Sieber.
- Arne Sorensen, 84, Canadian Olympic sports shooter.
- David Treasure, 74, Australian politician, member of the Victorian Legislative Assembly for Gippsland East (1992–1999).
- Richard Wilson, 92, British-American physicist.
- Zhengzhang Shangfang, 84, Chinese linguist (reconstruction of Old Chinese).

=== 20 ===
- Antonio Annibale, 78, Italian footballer (Internazionale, Cesena, Pisa).
- Jaroslav Brabec, 68, Czech Olympic shot putter (1972, 1976) and athletics coach.
- Billy Cannon, 80, American football player (Houston Oilers, Oakland Raiders, Kansas City Chiefs), Heisman Trophy winner (1959).
- Ramón Chao, 82, Spanish anti-Francoist journalist (Le Monde, La Voz de Galicia) and writer.
- Dick Deschaine, 87, American football player (Green Bay Packers, Cleveland Browns).
- Bill Gold, 97, American film poster artist (Casablanca, The Exorcist, A Streetcar Named Desire), complications from Alzheimer's disease.
- Richard N. Goodwin, 86, American political writer, cancer.
- Lois Kelso Hunt, 91, American actress (The House on Sorority Row, Head of State) and theatre director.
- Ali Hussnein, 93, Libyan politician, Foreign Minister of Kingdom of Libya (1969).
- Koo Bon-moo, 73, South Korean business executive, Chairman of LG Corporation, brain tumor.
- Fernando Mac Dowell, 72, Brazilian engineer and politician, Deputy Mayor of Rio de Janeiro (since 2017), heart attack.
- Elizabeth Norman McKay, 86, English musicologist.
- Carol Mann, 77, American Hall of Fame golfer (LPGA).
- Patricia Morison, 103, American actress (Kiss Me, Kate, Dressed to Kill, The Song of Bernadette).
- Colin Morris, 89, British Methodist minister.
- John Morroni, 63, American politician, member of the Florida House of Representatives (1992–2000), leukemia.
- Senén Mosquera, 80, Colombian footballer.
- Ernie Page, 83, Australian politician, MLA for Waverley (1981–91) and Coogee (1991–2003).
- Rolf Sand, 98, Norwegian actor.
- Dieter Schnebel, 88, German composer.
- Ron Syrett, 87, English rugby union player.
- Roland Vogt, 77, German politician.
- DeCharlene Williams, 75, American businesswoman and activist, uterine sarcoma.

=== 21 ===
- António Arnaut, 82, Portuguese politician, poet and Grand Master of Grande Oriente Lusitano, Minister of Social Affairs (1978).
- Aleksandr Askoldov, 85, Russian actor and film director (Commissar).
- Max Cohen-Olivar, 73, Moroccan racing driver.
- Palmer Collins, 87, American politician.
- Camilo Diaz Gregorio, 78, Filipino Roman Catholic prelate, Bishop of Bacolod (1989–2000) and Prelate of Batanes (2003–2017).
- Muhammad Fazil, 91, Pakistani Olympic sprinter (1952).
- Anna Maria Ferrero, 84, Italian actress (The Violent Patriot, Bad Girls Don't Cry, Love and Larceny).
- Franny Firth, 61, English footballer (Huddersfield Town, Halifax Town, Bury).
- John Fremantle, 5th Baron Cottesloe, 91, English aristocrat.
- Dave Garcia, 97, American baseball coach and manager (San Diego Padres, Cleveland Indians, Milwaukee Brewers).
- Gholamreza Hassani, 90, Iranian Islamic leader.
- Don Jessop, 90, Australian politician, MHR for Grey (1966–1969), Senator (1971–1987).
- Adam Keel, 93, Swiss artist.
- Nobukazu Kuriki, 35, Japanese mountaineer, heart attack.
- Allyn Ann McLerie, 91, Canadian-born American actress, singer, and dancer (They Shoot Horses, Don't They?, The Way We Were, All the President's Men).
- Yaddanapudi Sulochana Rani, 78, Indian novelist.
- Laurie Reed, 81, British Olympic runner.
- Dovey Johnson Roundtree, 104, American civil rights activist and attorney (Keys v. Carolina Coach Co.).
- Glenn Snoddy, 96, American recording engineer.
- Reg Stratton, 78, English footballer (Fulham, Colchester United).
- Pedro Pangelinan Tenorio, 84, Northern Mariana Islander politician, Governor (1982–1990, 1998–2002).
- Vasilis Triantafillidis, 78, Greek comedian and singer.
- Marjet Van Puymbroeck, 97, Belgian politician, Senator and Flemish MP (both 1981–1987).
- Clint Walker, 90, American actor (Cheyenne, The Dirty Dozen, Small Soldiers), heart failure.
- Faith Whittlesey, 79, American politician and diplomat, ambassador to Switzerland (1985–1988), cancer.
- Gina Zamparelli, 59, American concert promoter, glioblastoma.

=== 22 ===
- Tazin Ahmed, 42, Bangladeshi actress, heart attack.
- Michael Banton, 91, British social scientist.
- Dobie Craig, 80, American football player (Oakland Raiders, Houston Oilers).
- Alberto Dines, 86, Brazilian journalist (Jornal do Brasil, Grupo Abril, Observatório da Imprensa), writer and professor (Columbia University Graduate School of Journalism).
- Ezola Foster, 79, American political activist and writer.
- Stefan Kölly, 90, Austrian footballer
- Yuriy Kutsenko, 66, Russian athlete, Olympic silver medalist (1980).
- Lu Chunling, 96, Chinese flautist.
- Abdul Majeed Abdul Bari, 55, Maldivian politician, Minister of Islamic Affairs (2008–2012).
- Júlio Pomar, 92, Portuguese painter.
- Philip Roth, 85, American writer (Goodbye, Columbus, American Pastoral, The Human Stain), Pulitzer Prize winner (1998), heart failure.
- Daniela Samulski, 33, German Olympic swimmer (2000, 2008), European champion (2006, 2010), stomach cancer.
- Hafiz Siddiqi, 87, Bangladeshi academic, vice-chancellor of North South University (2003–2010).
- Elizabeth Sung, 63, Hong Kong-born American actress (Memoirs of a Geisha, The Young and the Restless, Lethal Weapon 4), lymphoma.
- Roland Wommack, 81, American Olympic fencer.

=== 23 ===
- Michel Archambault, 67, Canadian ice hockey player (Chicago Blackhawks).
- Eric Barnard, 90, British neuroscientist.
- Vinod Bhatt, 80, Indian humourist and biographer.
- Celia Brackenridge, 67, British sportswoman and campaigner, leukaemia.
- Bob Buczkowski, 54, American football player (Los Angeles Raiders, Phoenix Cardinals, Cleveland Browns).
- Glynn Edwards, 87, British actor (Minder, Get Carter, The Paper Lads).
- Kai Ekanger, 88, Norwegian politician.
- Antonio Horvath, 68, Chilean civil engineer and politician, Deputy (1990–1994) and Senator (1994–2018), lymphatic cancer.
- Don Hume, 80, American racing driver (NASCAR Cup Series).
- Sir Miles Hunt-Davis, 79, British army officer and courtier, Private Secretary to the Duke of Edinburgh (1993–2010).
- Keith Kinderman, 78, American football player (San Diego Chargers, Houston Oilers).
- Irving London, 99, American hematologist and geneticist.
- Carlos Lozano Guillén, 68, Colombian activist and political leader (Colombian Communist Party), cancer.
- Jeanna Michaels, 62, American actress (Dallas).
- Homer Neal, 75, American physician, stroke.
- Jean-François Parot, 71, French diplomat and writer.
- Richard Peck, 84, American writer (A Year Down Yonder, A Long Way from Chicago, The Ghost Belonged to Me), Newbery Medalist (2001).
- Luis Posada Carriles, 90, Cuban exiled anti-Castro militant, CIA agent and convicted terrorist (CORU).
- Daniel Robin, 74, French wrestler, Olympic double-silver medalist (1968).
- László Tábori, 86, Hungarian-born American Olympic athlete (1956).
- Masaki Tamura, 79, Japanese cinematographer.

=== 24 ===
- Zorawar Chand Bakhshi, 96, Indian army general, lung infection.
- Tsehaytu Beraki, 78, Eritrean krar player and independence activist.
- Jacky Buchmann, 86, Belgian politician, MP (1974–1977, 1978–1985), Flemish MP (1980–1995), Senator (1985–1995).
- Gudrun Burwitz, 88, German neo-nazi militant, daughter of Heinrich Himmler.
- Phil Emmanuel, 65, Australian guitarist, asthma attack.
- Angelo Falcón, 66, Puerto Rican political scientist and journalist, founder of the National Institute for Latino Policy.
- Charlotte Fox, 61, American mountaineer.
- Adrien Giraud, 81, French politician, Senator for Mayotte Island (2004–2011).
- Paul Harris, 69, Scottish author and publisher.
- Horst Hirnschrodt, 77, Austrian footballer (Austria Vienna, national team).
- Cliff Jackson, 76, English footballer (Crystal Palace, Plymouth Argyle, Swindon Town).
- Jerry Maren, 98, American actor (The Wizard of Oz), heart failure.
- Robin Miller, 65, American journalist and author.
- Albrecht Müller, 78, German Olympic rower (1964), European champion (1964).
- Adelaide Neri, 77, Brazilian teacher and politician.
- Oddur Pétursson, 86, Icelandic Olympic cross country skier (1952, 1956).
- José Alberto Rozo Gutiérrez, 81, Colombian Roman Catholic prelate, Vicar Apostolic of Puerto Gaitán (1999–2012).
- Don Steffes, 88, American politician.
- TotalBiscuit, 33, British gaming critic, commentator and Internet personality, colorectal cancer.
- Bob Sullivan, 60, Canadian ice hockey player (Hartford Whalers, HC Bozen–Bolzano).
- Walter Vera, 90, Uruguayan Olympic sport shooter.

=== 25 ===
- Milo Backus, 86, American geophysicist.
- Elmer Behnke, 89, American basketball player (Milwaukee Hawks).
- Paul Bloch, 78, American publicist (Eddie Murphy, Bruce Willis, Sylvester Stallone).
- Dale Dawson, 53, American football player (Minnesota Vikings, Philadelphia Eagles, Green Bay Packers).
- Dean Francis, 44, British boxer, European super middleweight champion (1997), cancer.
- Gary Garfinkel, 55, American studio executive (Showtime).
- Sergio Graziani, 87, Italian actor and voice actor.
- Kaduvetti Guru, 57, Indian politician.
- José Hawilla, 74, Brazilian journalist, convicted fraudster and informant, lung disease.
- Brendan Ingle, 77, Irish boxing trainer (Naseem Hamed).
- George Jenson, 87, Canadian-American visual effects artist (2010: The Year We Make Contact) and production illustrator (Close Encounters of the Third Kind, The Rocketeer), complications from melanoma.
- Piet Kee, 90, Dutch composer and organist.
- Fred Kovaleski, 93, American tennis player and spy, prostate cancer.
- Naser Malek Motiei, 88, Iranian actor (Mehdi in Black and Hot Mini Pants, And Then There Were None, Torkaman).
- Bill Mallory, 82, American football coach (Indiana Hoosiers, Miami RedHawks, Colorado Buffaloes), fall.
- Phil McKnight, 93, Scottish footballer (Chelsea, Leyton Orient).
- Jim Phillips Sr., 87, American politician, member of the North Carolina Senate (1997–2001).
- Hildegard Puwak, 68, Romanian politician, Minister of European Integration (2000–2003).

=== 26 ===
- Alan Bean, 86, American astronaut (Apollo 12, Skylab 3), fourth person to walk on the Moon.
- Pierre Bellemare, 88, French writer and radio personality.
- Peter Berry, 83, English Anglican clergyman, Provost of Birmingham Cathedral (1986–1999).
- Stuart Bondurant, 88, American physician.
- Jean Chateau, 91, French cyclist.
- Clement Chang, 89, Taiwanese politician, Minister of Transportation and Communications (1989–1991).
- Ted Dabney, 81, American electrical engineer, co-founder of Atari, esophageal cancer.
- Antonis Dermatis, 81, Greek footballer
- Herman D. Farrell Jr., 86, American politician, member of the New York State Assembly (1975–2017).
- Chipper Harris, 55, American basketball player (Robert Morris Colonials), complications from diabetes.
- William Howie, Baron Howie of Troon, 94, British politician and life peer.
- Gregg Juarez, 94, American art dealer and philanthropist.
- Mazhar Kaleem, 75, Pakistani lawyer and novelist (Imran Series).
- Gerard Kerkum, 87, Dutch football player and manager (Feyenoord).
- Michael Kirwan, 64, American artist.
- Harding Lemay, 96, American screenwriter (Another World, Strange Paradise).
- Fonda Metassa, 80, Australian rugby league footballer.
- Jules Meurisse, 87, Luxembourgish footballer.
- Nick Michaels, 67, Canadian-American voice actor.
- Roger Piantoni, 86, French footballer (Nancy, Stade de Reims, national team).
- Antonio Pujía, 88, Italian-born Argentine sculptor.
- John Rowan, 93, British psychologist.
- Svetlin Rusev, 84, Bulgarian artist.
- William Shaw, 85, Canadian politician, MNA (1976–1981).
- Paul E. Zeltner, 92, American politician.
- Frank Zullo, 85, American politician, Mayor of Norwalk, Connecticut (1965–1971).

=== 27 ===
- Jeffrey L. Bannister, 57, American major general.
- Jean Konan Banny, 88, Ivorian politician.
- Marcos de Celis, 86, Spanish bullfighter.
- John DiFronzo, 89, American mobster (Chicago Outfit), complications from Alzheimer's disease.
- Gardner Dozois, 70, American Hall of Fame science fiction writer (Morning Child, Hunter's Run) and editor (Asimov's Science Fiction), Nebula Award winner (1984, 1985), infection.
- Andrés Gandarias, 75, Spanish racing cyclist.
- Connie Kurtz, 81, American LGBT rights activist, liver cancer.
- Aly Lotfy Mahmoud, 82, Egyptian economist and politician, Prime Minister (1985–1986).
- Russell Nype, 98, American actor (Hello, Dolly!, Love Story, Call Me Madam) and singer, Tony winner (1951, 1959).
- Odd Oppedal, 81, Norwegian footballer (Brann, national team).
- Donald H. Peterson, 84, American astronaut (STS-6), Alzheimer's disease and bone cancer.
- Madala Ranga Rao, 70, Indian actor and film producer (Yuvatharam Kadilindi).
- Russ Regan, 89, American music business executive.
- Harald Bjarne Slettebø, 96, Norwegian politician.

=== 28 ===
- Christine Beattie, 53, American developmental neurobiologist, cancer.
- Ely Calil, 72, Lebanese-British businessman, fall.
- Pippo Caruso, 82, Italian composer (Maladolescenza, Kill Johnny Ringo) and conductor.
- Neale Cooper, 54, Scottish football player (Aberdeen) and manager.
- Paulette Coquatrix, 102, French costume designer (Napoléon, Lady Chatterley's Lover, Le Miroir à deux faces).
- Serge Dassault, 93, French businessman (Dassault Group) and politician, Senator (2004–2017).
- Yves de Daruvar, 97, Turkish-born French military officer and politician, High Commissioner of Comoros (1962–1963), Secretary-general of French Somaliland (1959–1962).
- Michael Dickson, 73, British structural engineer.
- Semavi Eyice, 95, Turkish art historian (Istanbul University), Presidential Culture and Arts Grand Awardee (2011).
- Cornelia Frances, 77, English-born Australian actress (The Young Doctors, Home and Away, The Lost Islands), bladder cancer.
- Dai Games, 79–80, Welsh chemist.
- Stevan Horvat, 85, Serbian wrestler, Olympic silver medallist (1968).
- Eddie Lane, 88, Australian footballer (South Melbourne).
- Lin Zunqi, 75, Chinese physicist and specialist in solid-state laser, academician of the Chinese Academy of Sciences.
- Siddu Nyamagouda, 70, Indian politician, traffic collision.
- María Dolores Pradera, 93, Spanish singer and actress.
- Dick Quax, 70, Dutch-born New Zealand athlete, Olympic silver medalist (1976), cancer.
- Peter Riegel, 83, American research engineer.
- Rachel Rockwell, 49, American actress and choreographer (Mamma Mia!), ovarian cancer.
- Hanns-Martin Schneidt, 87, German conductor, harpsichordist, organist, generalmusikdirektor and academic.
- Jens Christian Skou, 99, Danish physician and chemist, Nobel Prize laureate (1997).
- Chuck Stevens, 99, American baseball player (St. Louis Browns).
- Michel Stolker, 84, Dutch racing cyclist.
- Dick Tuck, 94, American political prankster.
- Cliff Tucker, 29, American basketball player (Maryland Terrapins), traffic collision.
- Ola Ullsten, 86, Swedish politician, Prime Minister (1978–1979).
- Wang Da-hong, 100, Chinese-born Taiwanese architect.
- Scott R. White, 55, American materials scientist, ocular melanoma.

=== 29 ===
- Ray Barker, 82, American baseball player (New York Yankees).
- Rosa Briceño Ortiz, 61, Venezuelan conductor, leukemia.
- Luciano José Cabral Duarte, 93, Brazilian Roman Catholic prelate, Archbishop of Aracaju (1971–1998).
- Yoseph Imry, 79, Israeli mesoscopic physicist.
- A. S. Jayawardena, 81, Sri Lankan economist.
- Stewart Lupton, 43, American musician (Jonathan Fire*Eater).
- Brian Mee, 88, Australian footballer (St Kilda).
- Joseph Pintauro, 87, American academic and playwright, complications from prostate cancer.
- Ray Podloski, 52, Canadian ice hockey player (Boston Bruins), complications from a heart attack.
- Robert F. Ray, 82, American politician.
- Marianna Sankiewicz-Budzyńska, 96, Polish pioneer electronics engineer and academic.
- James Schaefer, 79, American politician, member of the South Dakota House of Representatives (since 2011), traffic collision.
- Muktha Srinivasan, 88, Indian film director and producer (Mudhalali, Panchaali, Naalu Veli Nilam).
- Ivar Stakgold, 92, Norwegian-born American mathematician, heart failure.
- Arturo Antonio Szymanski Ramírez, 96, Mexican Roman Catholic prelate, Archbishop of San Luis Potosí (1987–1999).
- René Yañez, 75, Mexican-born American artist, founder of Galería de la Raza, cancer.
- Madiha Yousri, 96, Egyptian actress.

=== 30 ===
- Wale Aboderin, 60, Nigerian journalist and sports administrator, heart disease.
- Baruch Brody, 75, American bioethicist.
- Barry Dodd, 70, British entrepreneur and ceremonial officer, Lord Lieutenant of North Yorkshire (since 2014), helicopter crash.
- Gabriel Gascon, 91, Canadian actor (If I Were a Spy, La Menace, The Hypothesis of the Stolen Painting).
- Walter Habersatter, 88, Austrian Olympic ski jumper (1956).
- Auguste Mukwahepo Immanuel, 80, Namibian freedom fighter.
- Harold Kirker, 96, American historian.
- Dan Kneen, 30, Manx motorcycle rider, race collision.
- Ferenc Kovács, 84, Hungarian football player and coach, Olympic bronze medalist (1960).
- Li Zaiping, 92, Chinese molecular biologist, academician of the Chinese Academy of Engineering.
- Myrna McKay, 69, Canadian curler.
- Michael Noakes, 84, British artist.
- Jack Tu, 53, Taiwanese-born Canadian physician.
- Mel Weinberg, 93, American con artist and police informant (Abscam).
- Ray Weinberg, 91, Australian Olympic track and field athlete (1948, 1952).
- Freda Whitlam, 97, Australian educator.

=== 31 ===
- Michael Ajakwe Jr., 52, American television producer and writer (Eve, Sister, Sister, Martin), pancreatic cancer.
- Ella Brennan, 92, American restaurateur.
- Peter Clifton, 76–77, Australian film director (The Song Remains the Same).
- Michael D. Ford, 90, English art director and set decorator (Raiders of the Lost Ark, Titanic, The Empire Strikes Back), Oscar winner (1982, 1998).
- Colin Forsyth, 70–71, English rugby league footballer.
- Pandurang Fundkar, 67, Indian politician, member of the Maharashtra Legislative Assembly (1978–1985) and Lok Sabha (1989–1998), heart attack.
- Noël A. Kramer, 72, American judge.
- Eunice Lam, 75, Hong Kong writer, columnist, and socialite, lung cancer.
- Nairn MacEwan, 76, Tanzanian-born Scottish rugby union coach.
- Roland Penner, 93, Canadian politician, MLA (1981–1988), complications of a broken ankle.
- Steven Pitt, 59, American forensic psychiatrist, shot.
- Aníbal Quijano, 90, Peruvian sociologist, developer of coloniality of power concept.
- Marcel-Claude Roy, 81, Canadian politician.
- Étienne Sansonetti, 82, French footballer.
- M. L. Thangappa, 84, Indian writer.
- Joe E. White, 80, American educator.
