= Dwight Jones =

Dwight Jones may refer to:

- T. A. Dwight Jones (1887–1957), American football player and coach in the United States
- Dwight Clinton Jones (born 1948), mayor of Richmond, Virginia
- Dwight Jones (basketball) (1952–2016), American basketball player
- Dwight Sean Jones (defensive end) (born 1962), American football player
- Dwight Jones (American football) (born 1989), American football player
- Dwight Lamon Jones, perpetrator of the 2018 Scottsdale shootings

== See also ==
- Jones (surname)
