= O'Rear =

Surname list

O'Rear is an Irish surname. Notable people with the surname include:

- Alf O'Rear (1923–2018), American politician and member of the Tennessee House of Representatives
- Bob O'Rear, seventh employee of Microsoft and developer of PC DOS
- Charles O'Rear (born 1941), American photographer
- Edward C. O'Rear (1863–1961), American politician and Justice of the Kentucky Court of Appeals
- Jim O'Rear, American actor, screenwriter, and director
