= Michelle Gray (neuroscientist) =

American neuroscientist

- Born: Alabama, USA
- Education: Alabama State University; Ohio State University; University of California, Los Angeles
- Known for: Development of BACHD transgenic mouse line
- Awards: 2020 Top 100 Inspiring Black Scientists in America CellPress, 2008 Dixon Scholar in Neuroscience
- Scientific career
- Fields: Neuroscience
- Workplaces: University of Alabama Birmingham

Michelle Gray is an American neuroscientist and professor of neurology and neurobiology at the University of Alabama Birmingham. Gray is a researcher in the study of the biological basis of Huntington's disease (HD). In her postdoctoral work, she developed a transgenic mouse line, BACHD, that is used worldwide in the study of HD. Gray's research continued to focus on the role of glial cells in HD. In 2020 Gray was named one of the 100 Inspiring Black Scientists in America by Cell Press. She is also a member of the Hereditary Disease Foundation’s scientific board.

== Early life and education ==
Gray was born in West Central Alabama, and was raised in a rural community. Her rural upbringing instilled in her a love of animal life and inspired her to pursue her undergraduate degree in the biological sciences. In 1993, Gray began college at Alabama State University in Montgomery, Alabama. Through several National Institutes of Health funded programs, Gray got involved in research both at ASU and during the summer at the University of Wisconsin Madison. Her research experiences undergrad, supported by the Minority Biomedical Research Support grant and the Minority Access to Research Careers program, allowed her to confirm that academia was her calling.

After graduating with a Bachelors of Science in 1997, Gray followed her passion for research by pursuing graduate training at Ohio State University in Columbus, Ohio. Gray trained under the mentorship of Christine Beattie in the Department of Molecular, Cellular, and Developmental Biology, studying nervous system development in zebrafish. She was the first graduate student in the lab and was funded by and F31 National Institutes of Health Grant. She explored the supernumary development of Mauthner neurons due to mutations in the deadly seven/notch1a gene. She found that the extra neurons that form as a result of the mutation are incorporated into the neural circuit critical for escape behavior in zebrafish. Since the neurons divide their territory, this suggest that plasticity or expansion of ancient escape response neural circuits may have paved the way for larger more complex escape neural circuits in mammals.

Following completion of her PhD in 2003, Gray moved to California to complete her postdoctoral work at the University of California, Los Angeles. Under the mentorship of X. William Yang, Gray switched her focus of study to neurodegenerative diseases, specifically Huntington's disease. Gray pioneered the development of a novel mouse model for HD that is now the predominant mouse model for HD used worldwide.

One of Gray's first projects in the lab was working with a team to develop a novel method for sorting and identifying genetically defined cell populations. She applied fluorescence activated cell sorting (FACS) to genetically labelled neurons and then characterized their gene expression profiles. They identified a new set of differentially expressed genes in two subtypes of basal neurons, and found that expression of Ebf1 is critical to the differentiation of striatonigral neurons which are implicated in HD.

In 2008, Gray published a paper in the Journal of Neuroscience highlighting a novel transgenic mouse model for HD that she developed. She achieved expression of the mutant huntingtin protein in mice using insertion of a bacterial artificial chromosome expressing the full-length human mutant huntingtin gene. The BACHD mice exhibited HD phenotypes, both behaviorally and neuropathologically.

== Career ==
In 2008, Gray joined the University of Alabama Birmingham Center for Neurodegeneration and Experimental Therapeutics (CNET) in the Department of Neurology. She became the Dixon Scholar and was an instructor in Neurology for two years before her promotion to tenure-track Assistant Professor in 2010. Gray is also affiliated with the Center for Glial Biology in Medicine, The Evelyn F. McKnight Brain Institute, and the Comprehensive Neuroscience Center at UAB. In addition to her research roles, Gray co-directs the School of Medicine's Summer in Biomedical Sciences (SIBS) Undergraduate Research Program and she is on the Board of Trustees for the Huntington's Disease Society of America.

Gray is the Principal Investigator of a lab focused on exploring the role of astrocytes in HD. She decided to transition her research focus to glial biology to understand the role of glial cells in HD. HD research had predominantly focused on medium spiny neurons, yet the majority of brain cells are glia and they have been increasingly recognized as contributors to neurodegeneration and disease processes in the brain. Gray used the mouse model that she pioneered in her postdoctoral work to achieve cell-type specific expression of the mutant huntingtin protein to dissect which cell type are playing which roles in disease pathogenesis and further dissect the mechanisms through which neurodegeneration occur in specifically striatal medium spiny neurons and cortical pyramidal neurons. She also explores the potential of modifying gliotransmitters to ameliorate the symptoms of HD.

In April 2021, she was elected to the Hereditary Disease Foundation’s Scientific Board, an organization that aims to find a cure for Huntington’s disease.

In September 2025, Gray was promoted to professor.

== Research ==
In 2013, shortly after Gray began her lab at UAB, she discovered that astrocytes in BACHD models of HD in mice exhibit aberrant glutamate release. Since glutamate-mediated excitotoxicity is known to injure neurons, this finding pointed to astrocytes playing a potential role in HD pathogenesis. While exploring the mechanisms of the aberrant glutamate release in BACHD astrocytes, Gray and her team found that the astrocytes have increased levels of the mitochondrial enzyme pyruvate carboxylase yet no changes in the enzyme that converts glutamate to glutamine in the cell.

Gray then investigated whether expression of mutant huntingtin is necessary in astrocytes for expression of HD symptoms. They used a conditional knock out mutation to selectively prevent expression of mutant huntingtin in astrocytes. This removal of mutant huntingtin in astrocytes led to significant improvements in motor movement and psychiatric symptoms, suggesting that astrocytes contribute to disease pathology in HD.

Once the astrocyte role in HD pathogenesis was established, Gray's research group explored the potential mechanisms underlying the role of astrocytes in HD. They first looked to gliotransmission and inhibited the SNARE complex in astrocytes to prevent exocytosis of gliotransmitters from astrocytes. They found an overall decrease in behavioral performance in certain tasks when the SNARE complex in astrocytes was inhibited, though the rotarod performance improved by 12 months of age suggestion that a region specific approach might highlight the role of specific astrocyte populations in the pathogenesis of HD.

== Awards and honors ==
- 2020 Top 100 Inspiring Black Scientists in America CellPress
- 2010 NINDS K01 Career Development Award
- 2008 Dixon Scholar in Neuroscience
- 2002-2002 NINDS F31 Ruth L. Kirschstein National Research Service Award

== Selected publications ==
- Zhu Y, Shamblin I, Rodriguez E, et al. Progressive cardiac arrhythmias and ECG abnormalities in the Huntington's disease BACHD mouse model. Hum Mol Genet. 2020;29(3):369‐381. doi:10.1093/hmg/ddz295
- Gray M. Astrocytes in Huntington's Disease. Adv Exp Med Biol. 2019;1175:355‐381. doi:10.1007/978-981-13-9913-8_14
- William Yang X, Gray M. Mouse Models for Validating Preclinical Candidates for Huntington's Disease. In: Lo DC, Hughes RE, eds. Neurobiology of Huntington's Disease: Applications to Drug Discovery. Boca Raton (FL): CRC Press/Taylor & Francis; 2011.
- Gray M, Shirasaki DI, Cepeda C, et al. Full-length human mutant huntingtin with a stable polyglutamine repeat can elicit progressive and selective neuropathogenesis in BACHD mice. J Neurosci. 2008;28(24):6182‐6195. doi:10.1523/JNEUROSCI.0857-08.2008
- Wang, Nan & Gray, Michelle & Lu, Xiao-Hong & Cantle, Jeffrey & Holley, Sandra & Greiner, Erin & Gu, Xiaofeng & Shirasaki, Dyna & Cepeda, Carlos & Li, Yuqing & Dong, Hongwei & Levine, Michael & Yang, X. (2014). Neuronal targets for reducing mutant huntingtin expression to ameliorate disease in a mouse model of Huntington's disease. Nature medicine. 20. 10.1038/nm.3514.
- Graham, Rona & Deng, Yu & Carroll, Jeffery & Vaid, Kuljeet & Cowan, Catherine & Pouladi, Mahmoud & Metzler, Martina & Bissada, Nagat & Wang, Lili & Faull, Richard & Gray, Michelle & Yang, Xiaoming & Raymond, Lynn & Hayden, Michael. (2010). Cleavage at the 586 Amino Acid Caspase-6 Site in Mutant huntingtin Influences Caspase-6 Activation In Vivo. The Journal of Neuroscience. 30. 15019-29. 10.1523/JNEUROSCI.2071-10.2010.
