= Stenius =

Stenius is a surname. Notable people with the surname include:

- Göran Stenius (1909–2000), Swedish Finnish journalist, official in the Foreign Ministry, and writer
- Nicolaas Stenius (1605–1670), Dutch theologian
- Yrsa Stenius, (1945–2018), Finnish born Swedish journalist and editor
