= John Hinnells =

Professor John Russell Hinnells (27 August 1941 – 3 May 2018) was Professor of Comparative Religion at the School of Oriental and African Studies of the University of London. At various times he held the posts of lecturer at Newcastle University, then Professor of Comparative Religion at Manchester University, and later at the University of Derby and Liverpool Hope University, and was a fellow at Robinson College, Cambridge.

== Biography ==
After school, he spent some time at Mirfield as part of the Community of the Resurrection, where he was influenced by the work of Trevor Huddleston. He then went to King's College London, tutored by Christopher Evans and Morna Hooker, with Desmond Tutu as a tutorial partner. Later, he would undertake postgraduate work at the School of Oriental and African Studies with Sir Harold Bailey and Mary Boyce.

From 1967 on, he shaped his subject in several ways over a period of five decades:

- He played a key role in the Shap Working Party, shaping the way religion has been taught in schools for the last fifty years. In 1970, he edited Comparative Religion in Education, with a foreword by the then Secretary of State for Education, Edward Short. This work argued that world religions should not be taught from a Western Christian perspective, but on their own terms, and in doing so, set the tone for religious education for the next 50 years.
- He popularised the subject of comparative religion through books with a wide readership, including the 1991 Who's Who of World Religions. the 1996 Handbook of Living Religions,⁣ the first 1997 Penguin Dictionary of Religions, the 2009 Handbook of Ancient Religions, and the 2010 Penguin Handbook of the World’s Living Religions.
- He deepened the research base through books on research methods that geographers and sociologists also use, most notably through The Routledge Companion to the Study of Religion, and the series on Textual Sources for the Study of Religion, which applied biblical criticism techniques to other religious works.
- He widened the thematic study of religion through books on religious diaspora, religion and violence, religion health and suffering, and religion wealth and giving.
- He was an authority on Zoroastrianism. His books on Zoroastrianism include Persian Mythology, Zoroastrians in Britain, and The Zoroastrian Diaspora: Religion and Migration.
- In total, according to Worldcat he is believed to have authored or edited some 246 works in around 800 editions.

A festschrift was published in his honour in 2017, building on his thematic study of religions to explore religion and material wealth. His work was memorialised in The Times and The Daily Telegraph, and by a memorial lecture by Almut Hintze at SOAS, His book collection is now at the Ancient India and Iran Trust in Cambridge, and is being catalogued as the John Hinnells Collection and made available through the Cambridge University Library.

== Other ==
- Coward, Harold; Hinnells, John; Williams, Raymond (2000). The South Asian Religious Diaspora in Britain, Canada and the United States. State University of New York.
- Hinnells, John R. Roy Porter (ed.). Religion, Health and Suffering. ISBN 9780203039243. OCLC 868975577.
- Jackson, Robert (2019). "50 years on: the Shap working party on world religions in education and its publications". Journal of Beliefs and Values. 40: 45–54. doi:10.1080/13617672.2019.1575113. S2CID 159116548.
