= Auguste Mukwahepo Immanuel =

Namibian guerrilla

- Born: Mukwanangombe Auguste Mukwahepo Immanuel; 7 October 1937; Ohangwena Region, Namibia
- Died: 30 May 2018 (aged 80); Engela, Ohangwena Region, Namibia
- Other name: Meekulu Mukwahepo

Mukwanangombe Auguste Mukwahepo Immanuel (7 October 1937 – 30 May 2018) affectionately known as Meekulu Mukwahepo, was a Namibian guerrilla, notable for being the first woman recruit of the People's Liberation Army of Namibia. Mukwahepo committed her life looking after children during the South African Border War, moving from one camp to another whenever the need arose.

In 1963 Mukwahepo left her home in Namibia and followed her fiancé Shikongo Hangala across the border into Angola. They survived hunger and war and eventually made their way to Tanzania. There, Mukwahepo became the first woman to undergo military training with SWAPO. For nine years she was the only woman in SWAPO's Kongwa camp. Moreover, she was then thrust into a more traditional women's role - taking care of children in the SWAPO camps in Zambia and Angola. Mukwahepo underwent combat training in 1965 in Kongwa, Tanzania where she remained for nine years. At independence she was repatriated along with five children that she took care of in exile, according to UNAM's Ellen Ndeshi Namhila ’s book about the life of Mukwahepo; Mukwahepo: woman soldier mother. Mukwahepo was given a state funeral and Her remains were interred at the Eenhana Burial Shrine in the Ohangwena Region on Saturday, 9 June 2018

== Death ==
Mukwahepo was accorded a State funeral in terms of article 32 (8) of the Namibian Constitution by President Hage Geingob and buried in Eenhana on 9 June at the Eenhana Burial Shrine after her memorial took place at the Eenhana Sports Stadium on June 8.

The burial was attended by Prime Minister Saara Kuugongelwa-Amadhila, former president Hifikepunye Pohamba, the Deputy Prime Minister and Minister of International Relations and Cooperation, Netumbo Nandi-Ndaitwah, Speaker of the National Assembly Peter Katjavivi and the Swapo Secretary General Sophia Shaningwa as well as Vice-president Nangolo Mbumba. It was also attended by the Consul General of Angola Francisco Correia and Judge President Petrus Damaseb.

In 1995 President Sam Nujoma conferred on her a medal at Omugulugwombashe in recognition of her heroism and contributions to the liberation of Namibia and was given a house by Former President Pohamba while Former Prime Minister Nahas Angula brought her furnitures for her sitting room.
