= Grover Connell =

Grover Connell was an American businessman and a trader of rice and sugar whose company was once the world's largest independently owned rice trader and accounted for 20% of U.S. rice exports. He was a member of the Forbes 400.

== Biography ==
Connell was born in New York City on April 12, 1918, to Grover Cleveland Connell, a Texas native who was assigned to open a New York City office for a Texas rice mill and founded his own company, Connell Rice & Commission Co., on Wall Street in 1926. He was named after former United States President Grover Cleveland. He attended high school in the Bronx and earned a Bachelor of Science degree from Columbia University in 1939.

He served in the United States Navy after briefly working in his father's rice business. Following the war, he returned to the family business and took over in 1950 and has served as the company's president until his death. Connell expanded the company's operations throughout Asia, the Middle East, and Africa via the Food for Peace program under USAID, making it the world's largest non-government owned rice trader. He also expanded the company's operations into food imports, finance, real estate, equipment leasing, and mining products. His company, The Connell Company, was named one of the largest family-owned businesses in the world in 2004. In 2005, Connell was estimated to have a net worth of $900 million by Forbes magazine.

In 1978, Connell was indicted in the Koreagate scandal for allegedly hiring Tongsun Park as his agent for Food for Peace sales to the South Korean Government. He was later acquitted. The Wall Street Journal reported in 1990 that Connell was a lobbyist for Zaire President Mobutu Sese Seko. Connell was also active in political contributions and was at once the third largest donor to the Democratic Party and a close friend of Congressman Otto Passman (D-LA.). He was also the largest contributor of speaking fees to members of the United States Congress and was called the "Corporate King of Honoraria" by The Washington Post.

== Personal life ==
Connell was a resident of Westfield, New Jersey. He was married to Patricia Day Connell. Connell died on May 17, 2018, at his home at the age of 100.
