= Lee Young-hee (designer) =

South Korean fashion designer (1936–2018)

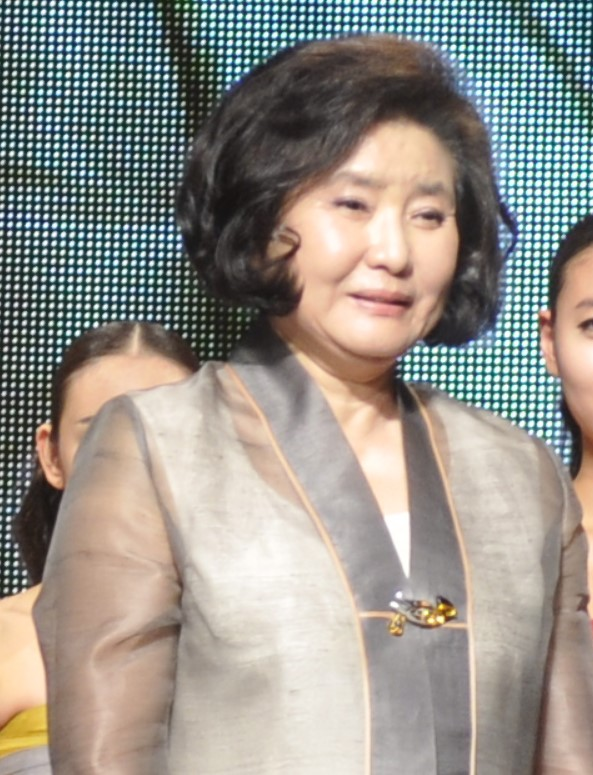
- Born: February 24, 1936; Taikyū, Keishōhoku-dō, Korea, Empire of Japan
- Died: May 17, 2018 (aged 82)
- Education: Sungshin Women's University
- Known for: Hanbok
- Label: Lee Young Hee
- Awards: Order of Cultural Merit (2009)

Lee Young-hee (Korean: 이영희, also spelled Lee Young Hee; February 24, 1936 – May 17, 2018) was a South Korean fashion designer. She worked on designing hanbok, Korean traditional clothes, to increase awareness of traditional Korean dress in the Western world since the early 1990s.

She was the representative of the Miraemunhwa foundation, and operated Maison de Lee Young Hee in Gangnam District, Seoul.

== Fashion ==
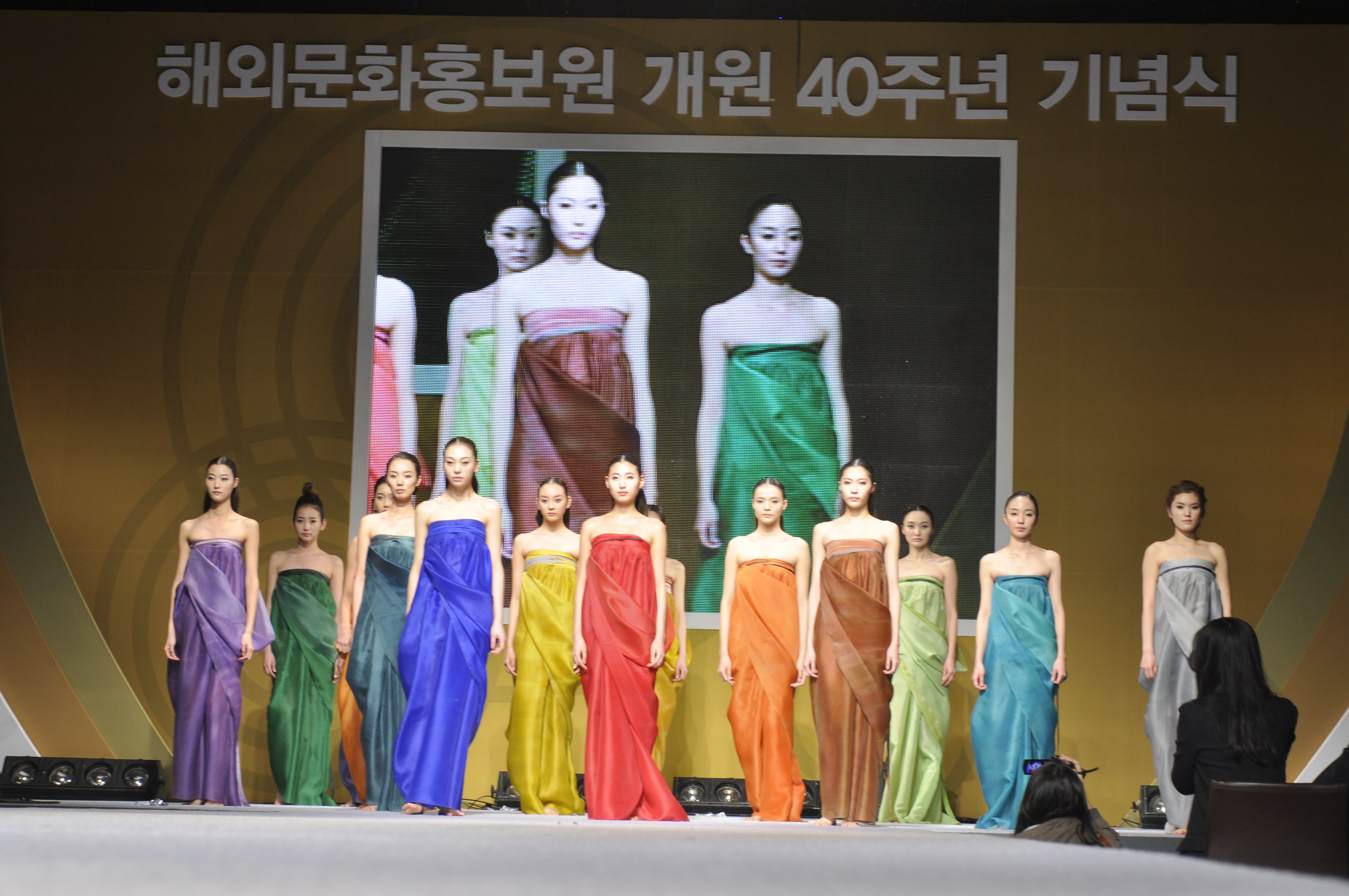
Lee's famous "Clothing of the Wind" collection, pictured December 19, 2011

Young-hee majored in dying design at Sungshin Women's University. In 1976, she opened her own shop under the title of "Lee Young Hee Korean clothes". In 1983, she joined the international festival in Washington D.C. to celebrate the independence of the United States.

In 1993, she made her debut in the Pret-a-Porter in Paris.

In 1993, she became the first, along with Lee Shin Woo, to be allowed to participate in pret-a-porte while establishing a hanbok boutique in Paris the following year. She continued to introduce unique design and style of oriental clothes and Korean culture in Europe. She thought that old-fashioned hanbok had difficulties in daily life, such as movement.

Her most notable work is her collection "Clothing of the Wind" whose name describes the design of the hanbok. These hanboks were not traditional, with a slimmer dress line and a unique trademark in that the upper jacket part called a jeogori is missing, leaving only the dress underneath.

In 2003, she donated 12 sets of hanbok to Smithsonian Museum of Natural History, in the hopes of setting up a Korean gallery, which was opened in 2008. Lee was then required to design traditional wedding hanbok for the Smithsonian for months afterwards, adding ornaments.

The Lee Young Hee Museum of Korean Culture inaugurated in 2004 in her honor has since been closed in 2014.

Her design has features of involving elegant color and a neat silhouette, with a mixture of past and current styles.

When the APEC summit was held in Busan, South Korea, she became in charge of preparing outer garments (durumagi) of 21 heads attending the event.

During her final years the Korean media spotlight came down upon her for having designed various hanbok for a famous South Korean couple, Jang Dong Gun and Go So Young and also for their relatives for their wedding.

Lee Young Hee also designed hanbok for the first ladies of South Korea such as, Lee Soon-ja, Kim Ok-sook, and Kim Yoon-ok, first lady to previous president Lee Myung Bak, who was in office during rrom 2008 until 2013.

Her work is known to influence major designers and brands, such as the late Karl Lagerfeld, Dior, and Carolina Herrera. (See Dior and Carolina Herrara's respective spring 2011 collections.)

== Autobiography ==
In 2009, she published an autobiography, 《Hanbok Designer leaving for Paris》 (파리로 간 한복쟁이). In her book, she said "I've learned the philosophy and my life via hanbok".
