= Steven Pitt (psychiatrist) =

American forensic psychiatrist (1959–2018)

Steven Pitt DO
- Born: March 12, 1959; Southfield, Michigan, U.S.
- Died: May 31, 2018 (aged 59); Scottsdale, Arizona, U.S.
- Education: Michigan State University College of Osteopathic Medicine
- Occupation: Physician
- Employer: University of Arizona College of Medicine

Steven Pitt (March 12, 1959 – May 31, 2018) was an American forensic psychiatrist.

== Family and education ==
Pitt was born and grew up in Southfield, Michigan, and was Jewish. He graduated from Southfield-Lathrup High School. He earned his B. A from the Michigan State University College of Osteopathic Medicine and did his psychiatric residency training at the Michigan State University College of Osteopathic Medicine.

== Career ==
Pitt was a professor of psychiatry at the University of Arizona College of Medicine.

In 2006 Pitt helped the police identify the Baseline killer who had raped and murdered a series of women in Phoenix, Arizona.

Pitt worked extensively on the JonBenét Ramsey case — where he was retained by both the police and prosecutor. He also worked in the investigation of the Columbine High School massacre, the Deer Creek Middle School shooting, and the Kobe Bryant sexual assault case.

== Death ==
Pitt was murdered on May 31, 2018, by the perpetrator of the 2018 Scottsdale shootings.
