= Satoshi Kako =

Japanese author and illustrator (1926–2018)

Satoshi Kako (かこさとし, Kako Satoshi) (31 March 1926 – 2 May 2018) was a Japanese author and illustrator of children's books.

== Life ==
Born in Fukui Prefecture on 31 March 1926, Satoshu Kako originally trained as an applied chemist and had a career as a chemical engineer. In Japan, he is best known for his educational works that combine his engineering and scientific background with his love of storytelling.

Kako's works for very young children include The Story of Your Teeth, which was written in response to widespread dental problems among Japanese children in the 1970s.

His main works are “Kako Satoshi Story Book” series, “Beautiful Picture”, “Daruma-chan” series, “Where is Toko-chan”, “Kako Satoshi Body Book” series, ” He produced more than 600 items, including Traditional Play Thoughts.

He died on 2 May 2018.

== Awards ==
- Takahashi Gozan Special Award in 1985.
