= R. Jay Turner =

American sociologist (1934–2018)

R. Jay Turner (December 19, 1934 - May 12, 2018) was a widely cited academic sociologist who uses demographic techniques to research epidemiology. He was a professor of sociology and psychiatry at Vanderbilt University, and he was affiliated with the Center for Research on Health Disparities. He also maintained the title of Emeritus Professor of Sociology and Epidemiology and a Professor of Psychology at Florida State University. While at FSU he was affiliated with the Center for Demography and Population Health.

His main research contributions include: stress and mental health/substance use problems; psychiatric epidemiology; and risk and protective factors for mental health and substance use problems. He has been the lead investigator on 19 federal grants in the United States and Canada.
