= Brian Mee =

Australian rules footballer

Personal information
- Full name: Brian Evan Mee
- Born: 25 April 1930
- Died: 29 May 2018 (aged 88)
- Original team: Camden
- Height: 175 cm (5 ft 9 in)
- Weight: 68 kg (150 lb)

Playing career^{1}
Years	Club	Games (Goals)
1949–50	St Kilda	10 (0)
- ^{1} Playing statistics correct to the end of 1950.

Brian Evan Mee (25 April 1930 – 29 May 2018) was an Australian rules footballer who played with St Kilda in the Victorian Football League (VFL).
