= The Sunday Post =

Weekly newspaper published in Dundee, Scotland

- The front page from 16 November 2008
- Type: Sunday newspaper
- Format: Tabloid
- Owner: DC Thomson
- Founded: 1914
- Headquarters: Dundee, Scotland
- Circulation: 27,727 (as of September 2025)
- Price: £0.90
- Website: sundaypost.com

The Sunday Post is a weekly newspaper published in Dundee, Scotland, by DC Thomson, and characterised by a mix of news, human interest stories and short features. The paper was founded in 1914 and has a wide circulation across Scotland, Ulster (chiefly across Northern Ireland and County Donegal), and parts of Northern England.

The current editor is Thomas Hawkins.

Sales of The Sunday Post in Scotland were once so high that it was recorded in The Guinness Book of Records as the newspaper with the highest per capita readership penetration of anywhere in the world; in 1969, its total estimated readership of 2,931,000 represented more than 80 per cent of the entire population of Scotland aged 16 and over. The Sunday Post has seen a decline in circulation in common with other print titles; in 1999, circulation was around 700,000, dropping to just under 143,000 in December 2016, with a year-on-year fall of 13.5% recorded for 2016.

2007 saw DC Thomson launch an advertising drive for The Sunday Post, primarily used on buses, in which the exclamation "Strip Sensation!" is seen by a picture of the folded paper displaying its masthead; next to this is the tagline punning on the exclamation: "A thoroughly decent read".

The newspaper backed a "No" vote in the referendum on Scottish independence.

In 2014, a weekly magazine supplement was reintroduced. Called IN10, it features entertainment, food, homes, gardens, travel and books as well as The Sunday Post's man in Hollywood, Ross King.

== Regular features ==
Regular columns include:

- My Week by Francis Gay (a generic character), featuring sentimental stories and a weekly short poem
- The Honest Truth – question and answer celebrity interview feature
- Raw Deal – consumer problems
- The Doc Replies – medical advice
- Can You Do Me a Favour? – readers asking if fellow readers can help them in their quest to find an item (discontinued)
- The Queries Man – readers send in questions on a range of topics, which an unnamed person answers
- Your Money – Personal finance feature.
- On The Box – TV review column.

Former long-running columns included:

- The HON Man – (a generic character), an unidentifiable peripatetic man (represented by a cartoon in all his photographs, and reputedly a team of reporters), who travelled Britain, meeting people and exploring local tourist attractions (HON being short for "Holiday on Nothing").

== Comics ==
There is a Fun Section featuring comic strips such as:

  - Oor Wullie
  - The Broons
  - Wee Harry
  - Wor Nicky

Comic strips that no longer appear include:

  - Nosey Parker Our Muddling Meddler
  - Nero and Zero The Rollicking Romans
  - Silias Snatcher The Truant Catcher
  - Wishbone Wuzzy
  - Austen and his Auto
  - Barnacle Bill
  - Funny Corner
  - Peter Pumpkin The Country Bumpkin
  - Natty Ned
  - Wee Jock Sparra
  - The Broons' Bairn

== Editors ==
2001: David Pollington
2010: Donald Martin
2015: Richard Prest
2023-present: Dave Lord

== See also ==
- The People's Friend
- List of newspapers in Scotland
- List of DC Thomson Publications
- Ron Scott
