= Rolande Allard-Lacerte =

Canadian writer and journalist

- Born: 17 July 1929; Saint-Évariste-de-Forsyth, Quebec
- Died: 18 May 2018 (aged 88)
- Occupations: journalist and writer

Rolande Allard-Lacerte (17 July 1929 – 18 May 2018) was a Quebec journalist and writer.

She was born in Saint-Évariste. She began her career in journalism as a contributor to L'Écho de Frontenac. From 1950 to 1958, she worked for La Tribune in Sherbrooke as music critic, editorial writer and editor for the women's pages. In 1961, she began working at Le Devoir. She also worked as a script writer for Chez Miville, a radio program at Radio Canada and was a contributor to Le Monde and other publications such as Perspectives, L'Agora, Critère, Madame au foyer, L'Actualité, Châtelaine and L'Humeur. From 1988 to 1990, she was president of the Cercle des femmes journalistes.

She published the children's books Les aventures de Kilucru, L'étoile chance and Le soleil des profondeurs, as well as the collections La chanson de Rolande, La bonne année and Poètes du Québec.

Allard-Lacerte was awarded the Prix Maxine in 1965 by l’Association des bibliothécaires de langue française, the Prix Marie-Lemelin in 1967 by la Société des Poètes canadiens-français, the Prix Juge-Lemay in 1969 by the Sherbrooke Saint-Jean-Baptiste Society, the Prix Athanase-David in 1970 and the Prix Judith-Jasmin in 1984.

She died on 18 May 2018 at the age of 88.
