= Luis Pellicer =

Spanish footballer

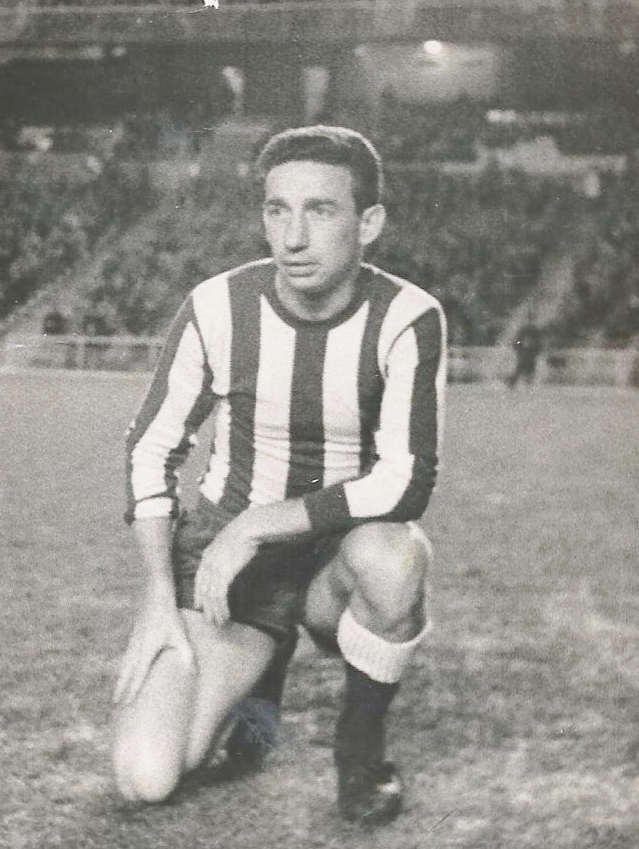
- Pellicer playing for Málaga.

Personal information
- Full name: Luis Pellicer Coma
- Date of birth: 19 September 1930
- Place of birth: Solsona, Spain
- Date of death: 14 May 2018 (aged 87)
- Place of death: Málaga, Spain
- Position: Defender

Youth career
- Barcelona

Senior career*
Years	Team	Apps	(Gls)
1950–1955	Lleida	99	(19)
1955–1956	Hércules	16	(0)
1956–1960	Sporting Gijón	94	(1)
1960–1962	Málaga	43	(0)
1962–1963	Melilla	16	(0)
Total		268	(20)
- * Club domestic league appearances and goals

Luis Pellicer Coma (19 September 1930 – 14 May 2018) was a Spanish professional footballer who played for Barcelona, Lleida, Hércules, Sporting Gijón, Málaga and Melilla, as a defender.
