= Rauf Talyshinski =

Azerbaijani journalist and newspaper editor

Rauf Talyshinski (Azerbaijani: Rauf Talışınski; 16 November 1956 – 8 May 2018) was an Azerbaijani journalist and newspaper editor. He was the chief editor of Zerkalo (since 1990) and Echo (since 2001).

== Life ==
Talyshinski graduated from the faculty of journalism of the Moscow State University in 1978. He went on to become a degree candidate in philological sciences. Talyshinski worked for the newspapers Molodyozh Azerbaydzhana (Youth of Azerbaijan, in 1978–1981), Vyshka and Izvestiya. In 1990 he became the chief editor of Zerkalo. Talyshinski received the honorary degree of Meritorious Journalist.
