= Ivan Dagnin =

South African cricketer (1938–2018)

Personal information
- Born: 4 March 1938
- Died: 6 May 2018 (aged 80)

Domestic team information
- Years: Team
- 1971-1983: Western Province
- Source: Cricinfo, 15 May 2018

Ivan Dagnin (4 March 1938 – 6 May 2018) was a South African cricketer. He played in four first-class matches for Western Province between 1971 and 1983.
