= Richard Fork =

American physicist

- Born: Richard L. Fork; September 1, 1935
- Died: May 16, 2018 (aged 82); Huntsville, Alabama, U.S.
- Education: Principia College (BA); Massachusetts Institute of Technology (PhD)
- Scientific career
- Fields: Physics
- Workplaces: Bell Laboratories, Rensselaer Polytechnic Institute, University of Alabama in Huntsville

Richard L. Fork (1 September 1935 – 16 May 2018) was an American physicist.

== Biography ==
Fork received a bachelor's degree in mathematics and physics from Principia College in 1957, and earned his doctorate in physics from the Massachusetts Institute of Technology. He began working for Bell Laboratories in 1962, and joined the faculty of Rensselaer Institute of Technology in 1990. Four years later, Dr. Fork left Rensselaer for the University of Alabama in Huntsville. Over the course of his career, Fork was granted fellowship of the American Physical Society and Optical Society of America. He retired in 2017 and died on May 16, 2018, of respiratory arrest in Huntsville. Dr. Fork also acted as a mentor who guided and assisted dozens of students pursuing optical/physics/laser based degrees at UAH.

== Achievements ==
Richard Fork has been very active in the field of generating light pulses with lasers.

- As early as 1964, he showed that locking the modes of a helium neon laser could produce picosecond pulses.
- In the early 80's he strongly contributed to the development of femtosecond lasers.
- In 1984 he, along with O.E. Martinez and J.P. Gordon, published a paper entitled "Negative group-velocity dispersion using refraction" in the Journal of the Optical Society of America A, which laid the groundwork for the "Martinez stretcher" which is the primary stretcher configuration used in the design of free-space, solid-state, chirped pulse amplifiers. The key mechanism in this achievement was the recognition of the potential for generating positive group delay dispersion (GDD) using two dispersive elements, which nominally produce negative GDD, by introducing a "telescope" between the two elements thus utilizing the Guoy Phase Shift to flip the sign of the dispersion. This finding was crucial because in order to stretch, amplify, and then compress a pulse it is required that the GDD introduced in the stretcher is exactly matched, in the negative sense, in the compressor. Since the standard compressor configurations all produce negative GDD, a positive GDD stretcher was required. Technically speaking, the stretcher and compressor can be swapped without loss of generality, but since the "Martinez Stretcher" is more difficult to align due to the inclusion of the "telescope", it is generally preferred to use it for the low-energy seed pulse, and the traditional compressor for the high-energy amplified output pulse.
  "Another important result [found in] $l_{eff} = [l-2(f_1+f_2)](f_1/f_2)^2$ is that $l_{eff}$ may have negative values, thus also allowing positive values for the group-velocity dispersion"
- In a second part of his career he focused his interest on the use of lasers for protecting Earth from asteroid impacts.
