= Paul Harris (artist) =

American sculptor and lithographer

- Paul Harris
- Born: November 5, 1925; Orlando, Florida, United States
- Died: 13 May 2018 (aged 92); Bozeman, Montana
- Known for: Fabric sculpture, lithography
- Awards: Guggenheim Fellowship, Fulbright Professor
- Website: www.paulharrisart.com

Paul Harris (November 5, 1925 – May 13, 2018) was an American sculptor and lithographer. He worked in a variety of media, but is best known for his life-sized stuffed and upholstered female figures.

== Early life ==
Harris was born in Orlando, Florida. His father, Julian Harris worked as a broker for an orange farmer; his mother, Dorothy Haul, died from unknown causes when he was five years old, and he lived with his maternal grandparents until 1936, when his father remarried. His father's new wife, Helga Ebsen, and her sister Vilma were both dancers. Helga taught him to dance and she encouraged his interest in art. He spent the summer of 1943 with Helga and Vilma in Pacific Palisades, California, where he went to classes at the Chouinard Art Institute and worked as a riveter at Douglas Aircraft.

In 1944, after graduating from high school, Harris joined the navy and served on board the USS Ault in the Pacific Theater during World War II. In 1946 he contracted rheumatic fever, spent six months in naval hospitals, and was discharged from the Navy in June 1946. During the war, Harris made many drawings of the sailors he served with on the Ault. On September 2, 1945, his ship was docked next to the USS Missouri, where the signing of the Japanese surrender took place, and Harris made a drawing of the ceremony. In 2017, he published these sketches in a book.

After the war, he initially enrolled at the University of New Mexico in 1946. He then travelled for a time, hitchhiking around Latin America, a stint that included being jailed as a vagrant in San Marcos, Guatemala. He attended the New School for Social Research, New York City, in 1948–1949 where he studied with Johannes Molzahn; then attended Hans Hofmann School of Fine Arts, in Provincetown, MA in 1949 where he studied directly under Hans Hofmann; he returned to New Mexico, where he was awarded his Bachelors of Fine Arts and a Masters of Fine Arts in Painting and Sculpture at the University of New Mexico in 1950–51. He earned his Ed.D. in Fine Arts at Teachers College, Columbia University, New York, in 1955.

== Career ==
In 1961–2 Harris was a Fulbright Professor and Artist in Residence at the Universidad Católica de Chile, in Santiago. In 1969-70 he was a Tamarind Lithography Workshop Fellow working with the artist Richard Diebenkorn. After that, he taught at a number of other art programs, including the San Francisco Art Institute (1964–66), the University of California Berkeley (1966–67), Sacramento State University (1967–68), and California College of Arts and Crafts, Oakland (1968–92). He also taught at Stanford University, SUNY New Paltz, and the Rhode Island School of Design. In the course of his career, Harris was also a MacDowell Colony resident in 1977, received a Guggenheim Fellowship in 1979, was a visiting artist at the Rinehart School of Sculpture, Baltimore, and taught at New York University.

Harris's one-man exhibitions include The Poindexter Gallery, New York City, 1958, 1960, 1963, 1967, 1970; The Lanyon Gallery, Palo Alto, California, 1965 Berkeley Gallery, Berkeley, California, 1965; The Candy Store Gallery, Folsom, California, 1967; the William Sawyer Gallery, San Francisco, 1969, 1971, 1987; Galerie Thelen, Essen, Germany, 1970; Galerie Redmann, Berlin, Germany, 1990, 1995; Fresno Museum of Art, Fresno, California, 1999; Yellowstone Art Museum, 2001. Harris's work was also included in two group shows at the Museum of Modern Art, New York City: "Sculpture USA, 1959" and "Hans Hofmann and his Students" 1963.

Harris's work appears in the permanent collections of University of California Berkeley Art Museum; Sheldon Museum of Art, University of Nebraska, Lincoln; The Los Angeles County Museum of Art, Los Angeles, California; The San Francisco Museum of Modern Art, San Francisco; the Yale University Art Gallery, New Haven, Connecticut The Museum of the University of New Mexico, Albuquerque; Neue Galerie der Stadt Aachen, Aachen, Germany; Montclair State University Collection, Montclair, New Jersey; the Fresno Art Museum, Fresno, California; the Hungarian National Museum, and the Harry N. Abrams Art Collection.

Harris's works would have gained wider exposure if his pieces had not been quickly entered into private collections. Although his body of work includes bronze sculptures, paintings, and lithographs, he is most known for his life-sized stuffed and upholstered female figures. Several of his lithographs from Tamarind are now in the collection of the National Gallery of Art in Washington, DC.

Beginning in 1964, he spent much of his career working from his studio in Bolinas, California. He retired from teaching in 1992. He later moved to Bozeman, Montana, where he died in 2018.

== Publications and awards ==
In addition to the Fulbright and the Guggenheim fellowships, Harris also won the Neallie Sullivan award from the San Francisco Art Association, and received a Lebovitz Foundation grant. His wide-ranging interests included dance, and he collaborated on a ballet called A False Alarm on the Nightbell Once Answered, based on "The Country Doctor," a story by Franz Kafka. He published a collection of short stories, and his drawings made during World War II were published in 2017 by Wrongtree Press.
