= Joe E. White =

American educator and oil and gas investor

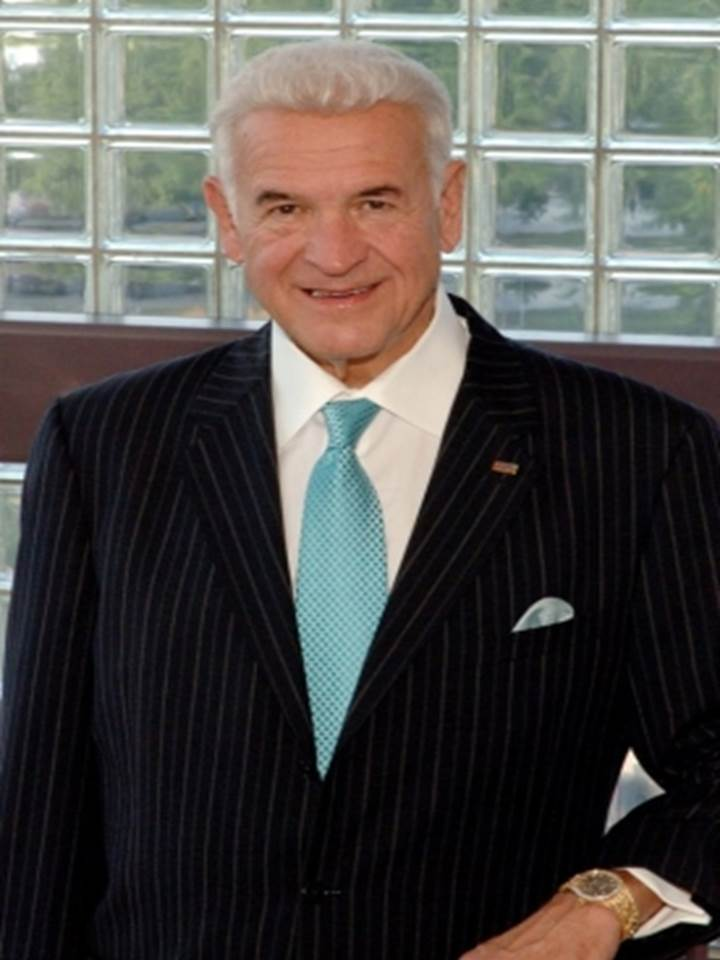

President of Carl Albert State College
- In office July 1, 1975 – July 1, 2007

Personal details
- Born: July 3, 1937 Oklahoma City, Oklahoma, U.S.
- Died: May 31, 2018 (aged 80) Edmond, Oklahoma, U.S.
- Spouse: Melba Sue Curfman
- Education: Oklahoma State University; Southwestern Oklahoma State University; Murray State College
- Profession: College president Oil and gas investor

Joe Ellis White (July 3, 1937 – May 31, 2018) was an American educator and oil and gas investor. White served as President of Carl Albert State College from 1975 to 2007. His tenure at Carl Albert State College marked one of the longest sitting college president terms in the state of Oklahoma.

White was a member of the Carl Albert State College Hall of Fame, the Oklahoma Higher Education Hall of Fame and the Murray State Distinguished Athlete Hall of Fame. He also owned and was a managing partner at White Energy, LLC.

== Early life and education ==
White was born in Oklahoma City, on July 3, 1937 to C. W. and Cleo White. White graduated from Alex High School in Alex, Oklahoma in 1955. From 1956 to 1958, White attended Murray State College where he played fullback on the Murray State College, football team. Following his graduation from Murray State College, White transferred to Oklahoma State University in Stillwater, Oklahoma where he received his Bachelor of Science degree in 1959.

In 1965, White completed his master's degree in education at Southwestern Oklahoma State University in Weatherford, Oklahoma. He returned to Oklahoma State University in 1974 completing his Doctorate in education.

== Career ==
In 1959, White began his career as the head football coach and English teacher at Alex High School, his alma mater. In 1962, White served as an assistant football coach and teacher at Roswell High School in Roswell, New Mexico. He later served as the coach of Minco High School in Minco, Oklahoma prior to being hired at Elk City High School in 1964.

White started at Elk City High School as a teacher, football coach, athletic director followed by assistant principal. He became Elk City High School’s head principal in 1968. He left Elk City to become superintendent of schools in Sentinel, Oklahoma in 1970. White later served as Elk City Public Schools superintendent. While superintendent of the Elk City schools, White was one of 50 superintendents to participate in an international study mission to the then-Soviet Union.

=== Carl Albert State College ===
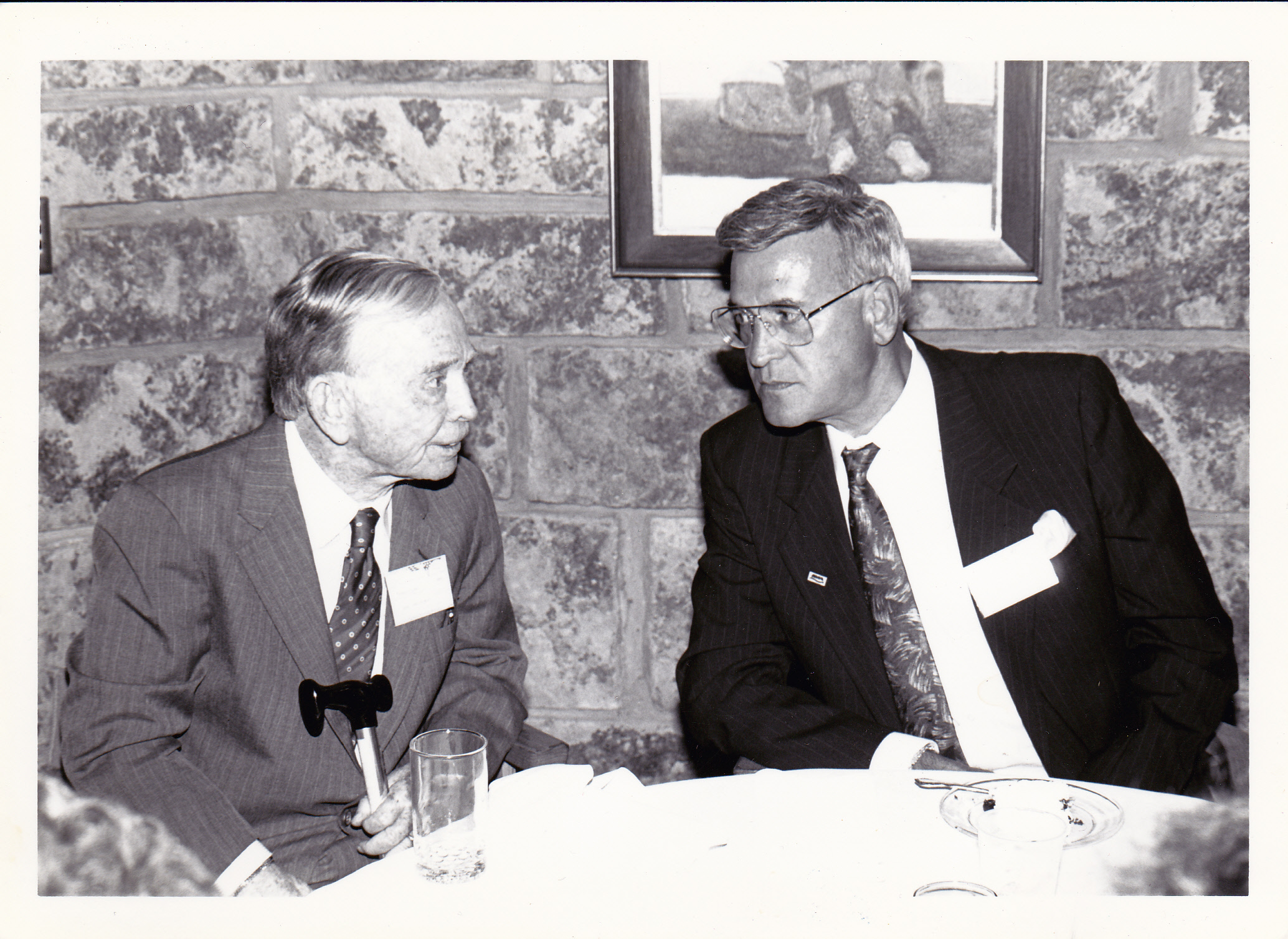
Former United States House Speaker Carl Albert and White

White was appointed president of Carl Albert State College (CASC) in 1975. During his tenure at CASC, from 1975 to 2007, student enrollment increased from 600 students in 1975 to over 3,700 students. During that period, CASC grew from a single campus with two buildings to 3 campuses located in Poteau, Sallisaw and Idabel. CASC also constructed six residence halls and tripled the size of its Sallisaw campus during White's tenure. White also oversaw the creation of the CASC Development Foundation, which was established in 1979.

In collaboration with former United States House Speaker Carl Albert, White created the Jimmy Carter Presidential Lecture Series at CASC. Featured speakers at the lecture series have included former Presidents Jimmy Carter, Gerald Ford, George H. W. Bush, and Miss America Shawntel Smith.

The Carl Albert State College library was named the "Joe E. White Library" in recognition of White's contributions to the college.

=== Other associations ===
White was a former chairman of the Council of Oklahoma's College and University Presidents; and sat on the National Council of Two-Year College Presidents and the executive committee of the Council of North Central Two-Year Colleges.

White was inducted into the Murray State College Distinguished Athlete Hall of Fame in 2003. In 2004, he was inducted into the Oklahoma Higher Education Heritage Society’ Higher Education Hall of Fame. He was also inducted into the CASC Hall of Fame in 2013. In 2019, White was posthumously inducted into the Oklahoma Association of Community Colleges (OACC) Hall of Fame.

== Personal life ==
In 1957, White married Melba Sue Curfman. They had two sons, Vance White of Los Angeles, California and Oklahoma City attorney Joe E. White Jr. In 2007, he retired from Carl Albert State College, and moved to Edmond, Oklahoma. That same year, he created White Energy, LLC. White Energy LLC has mineral interests in fourteen Oklahoma counties.

In 2014, White's wife, Melba, died at the age of 76. On May 31, 2018, he died at the age of 80. Memorials took place in Edmond and Poteau, Oklahoma.

== Publications ==
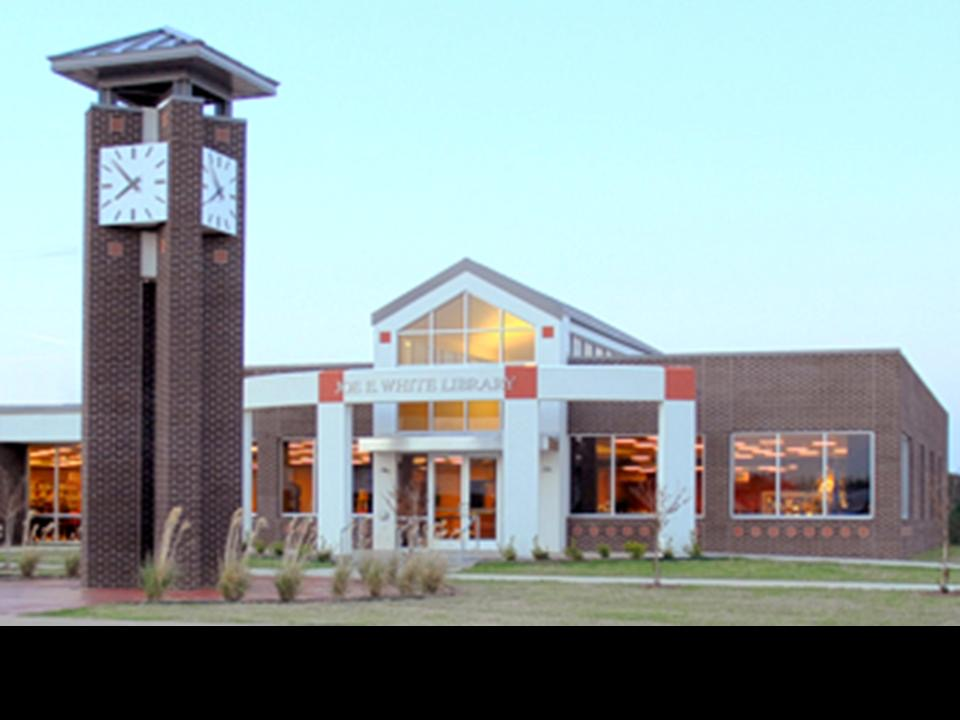
Joe E. White Library at Carl Albert State College

- "An Effective Communication System in a Senior High School," Oklahoma Educators Association Journal
- "A Successful Road to Accountability," Successful Ventures, State Department of Education
- "A Plan for Implementing a Statewide Network of Regional Centers," Doctoral Dissertation, Joe E. White Library
- "Oklahoma Higher Education’s Revised Admission and Retention Plan: What is it? Can It Work? Is it Worth the Trouble?" Eastern Oklahoma Schools Advisory Council Newsletter
- "President’s Angle," Carl Albert State College Viking Banner
