= Tony Gilmore =

Australian rules footballer (1949–2018)

Personal information
- Full name: Anthony Francis Gilmore
- Born: 3 December 1949
- Died: 10 May 2018 (aged 68); Gold Coast, Queensland
- Original team: Swan Hill
- Height: 178 cm (5 ft 10 in)
- Weight: 78 kg (172 lb)
- Position: Center

Playing career^{1}
Years	Club	Games (Goals)
1968–73	Geelong	41 (6)
- ^{1} Playing statistics correct to the end of 1973.

Anthony Francis Gilmore (3 December 1949 – 10 May 2018) was an Australian rules footballer who played with Geelong in the Victorian Football League (VFL).
