= Gary Garfinkel =

American television executive (1962–2018)

- Born: September 25, 1962
- Died: May 25, 2018 (aged 55)
- Education: Boston University; New York University Stern School of Business
- Occupation: Television executive

Gary Garfinkel (September 25, 1962 – May 25, 2018) was an American television executive.

== Early life ==
Garfinkel graduated from Cinnaminson (NJ) High School in 1980 and from Boston University with a bachelor's degree in finance and the New York University Stern School of Business.

== Career ==
Garfinkel began his career at Salomon Brothers. He subsequently worked for Sony Pictures Entertainment, and he joined Showtime Networks in 1993. In 2012, he became co-head of its acquisitions department with Kent Sevener.

== Death ==
Garfinkel died on May 25, 2018, at the age of 55.
