= Adam Keel =

Swiss artist (1924–2018)

Adam Dario Keel (16 November 1924 in Lugano – 21 May 2018) was a Swiss artist.
