= Jozef J. Zwislocki =

Polish-born American neuroscientist

- Born: Jozef John Zwislocki; March 22, 1922; Lwow, Second Polish Republic
- Died: May 14, 2018 (aged 96); Fayetteville, New York, U.S.
- Education: University of Rochester
- Scientific career
- Fields: Neuroscience
- Institutions: Syracuse University; University of Basel

Jozef John Zwislocki (March 22, 1922 – May 14, 2018) was a Polish-born American neuroscientist. His scientific work focused on auditory neuroscience and the mechanisms of human hearing. A native of Lwow, Poland, Zwislocki attended the Federal Institute of Technology in Zurich, Switzerland, and taught at the University of Basel from 1945 to 1951. He left for a research fellowship at Harvard University and was a member of the Syracuse University faculty between 1957 and 1992. Zwislocki held twelve patents. Over the course of his career, Zwislocki was granted fellowship into the Acoustical Society of America, as well as membership to the United States National Academy of Sciences, Polish Academy of Sciences, American Association for the Advancement of Science, and Association for Research in Otolaryngology, among others. He lived in Fayetteville, New York, and died on May 14, 2018, aged 96.
