= Stefan Kölly =

Austrian footballer (1928–2018)

Personal information
- Date of birth: 14 March 1928
- Place of birth: Eisenerz, Steiermark
- Date of death: 22 May 2018 (aged 90)

International career
Years	Team	Apps	(Gls)
1952	Austria	1	(0)

Stefan Kölly (14 March 1928 – 22 May 2018) was an Austrian footballer. He played in one match for the Austria national football team in 1952.
