= Carlos Lozano Guillén =

Colombian politician

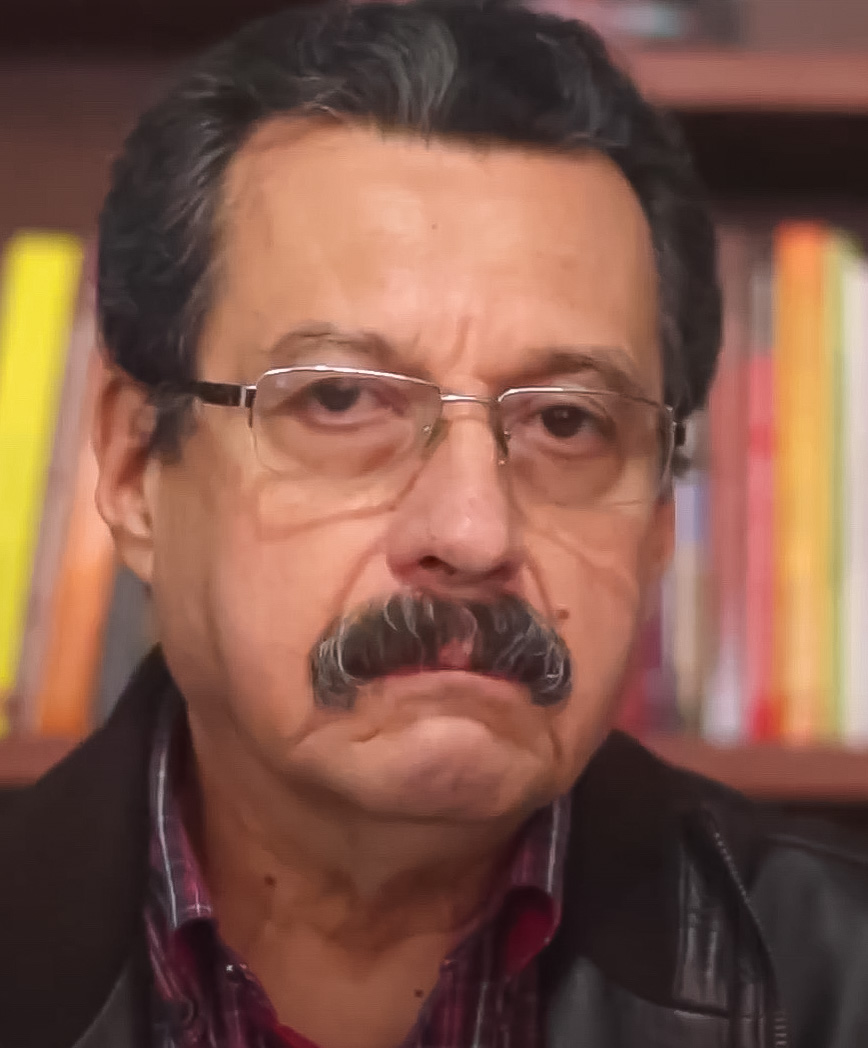
- Lozano in 2015
- Born: June 19, 1949; Ibagué, Colombia
- Died: May 23, 2018 (aged 68); Bogotá, Colombia
- Occupations: Journalist and political leader
- Known for: Member of the Colombian Communist Party
- Notable work: Voz

Carlos Lozano Guillén (19 June 1949 – 23 May 2018) was a Colombian journalist, activist and political leader. He was a member of the Colombian Communist Party.

== Biography ==
Lozano was editor of the Communist newspaper Voz since 1995. He also wrote for El Tiempo and engaged in activism. He wrote the books Las huellas de la Esperanza in 1997 and ¿Qué, cómo y cuándo negociar con las Farc?, in 2008.

In 2008, the French Legion of Honor was presented to Guillén. He was investigated for emails that claimed his ties to the FARC. Prosecutors questioned why Lozano did not intervene in a more determined way so that the Communist Party eliminated from its ideology the concept of combining all forms of struggle to gain power, a postulate that the rebel movement also shared. Lozano denied his links to FARC and said he never recommended kidnappings or terrorist acts.

Lozano ran for Senate in 2014 for the Green Alliance ticket and his participation in the rapprochement of the Government with the guerrillas of the FARC and the ELN was highlighted. He died of stomach cancer in Bogotá on 23 May 2018.
