= Chuck Panama =

American journalist and publicist (1925–2018)

- Born: February 2, 1925; Chicago, Illinois, U.S.
- Died: May 13, 2018 (aged 93); Los Angeles, California, U.S.
- Education: University of California, Los Angeles
- Occupation: Publicist
- Spouse: Gerry Panama
- Children: 1 son, 2 daughters

Charles (Chuck) Panama (February 2, 1925 – May 13, 2018) was an American journalist and publicist.

== Early life ==
Panama was born on February 2, 1925, in Chicago. to Ruth and Benjamin Panama. His father died of pneumonia when Chuck was just three months old. He had one sibling, Herb Panama, who was 5 years older.

He served in the Pacific during World War II. He was the radio man on a B-24 bomber in the Jolly Rodgers group in the US Army Air core (there was no air force then) His squadron was working its way towards mainland Japan when the US dropped the atomic bombs and the war ended.

Panama attended the University of California, Los Angeles. on the GI bill after WWII. He was the sports editor of the campus newspaper, the Daily Bruin. He did not graduate as he left UCLA when he got a job offer from International News Service.

== Career ==
Panama began his career in journalism at the International News Service. He subsequently worked in public relations for Harry Brand at 20th Century Fox. He represented celebrities like Faye Dunaway, Elvis Priestley, Henry Fonda, and Elizabeth Taylor. He was a publicist for The Simpsons and M*A*S*H.

Panama received the Les Mason Award from the International Cinematographers Guild in 1990.

== Personal life and death ==
With his wife Gerry, Panama had a son, Craig Panama and two daughters, Cindy Panama and Carrie Panama Requist.

Panama died on May 13, 2018, at the Motion Picture & Television Country House and Hospital in Woodland Hills, Los Angeles. He was 93.
