= Ron Scott (journalist) =

Scottish football journalist (1947–2018)

- Born: Ronald Scott; 1947; Dundee, Scotland
- Died: 5 May 2018 (aged 70); Dundee, Scotland
- Occupation: Journalist

Ronald Scott (1947 – 5 May, 2018) was a Scottish football journalist who worked for The Sunday Post for nearly fifty years. He was sports editor at the newspaper for 28 years.

== Early life ==
Scott was born in Dundee in 1947. Jimmie, his father, worked as a scout for English club Preston North End north of the border.

A "promising full-back", Scott earned a trial with St Johnstone, and marked Willie Johnston, Rangers' quick outside left, in his only game.

== Journalism ==
After his football career failed, Scott began work as an apprentice with DC Thomson, which was based in his hometown. He reported on his first match, a pre-season friendly, in the summer of 1968.

He was present at the Hillsborough disaster of 1989.

Scott became Chief Football Writer at the Post in January 2002. His column was called The Voice of Experience.

Up until his retirement in 2012, Scott phoned his match reports to a copytaker. For his retirement celebration, Sir Alex Ferguson recorded a tribute message to Scott.

== Personal life ==
Scott was married to Wendy. He had a brother and a daughter.

He was a Dundee F.C. fan, and also served on the committee of Dundee Violet F.C.

In 2007, at the age of 60, Scott became the president of the Scottish Football Writers' Association. He remained in the role for three years.

== Death ==
Scott died on 5 May 2018, aged 70, after a short illness. He submitted his last column from his bed at Dundee's Ninewells Hospital just over 24 hours before he died.

Tributes to his life came from Gordon Strachan and Walter Smith, amongst others, with the latter saying:

He was the first journalist to ever show an interest in me as a footballer when I was at Dundee United and was the first man to interview me. He took me for lunch that day – a couple of Scotch pies and a few pints! That was about 50 years ago and our relationship remained intact as I trusted him 100%. He was a genuine man who enjoyed life, enjoyed his work and loved his family. He has gone far too soon, and will be missed.

— Walter Smith, May 2018
