= Rod Jellema =

American poet

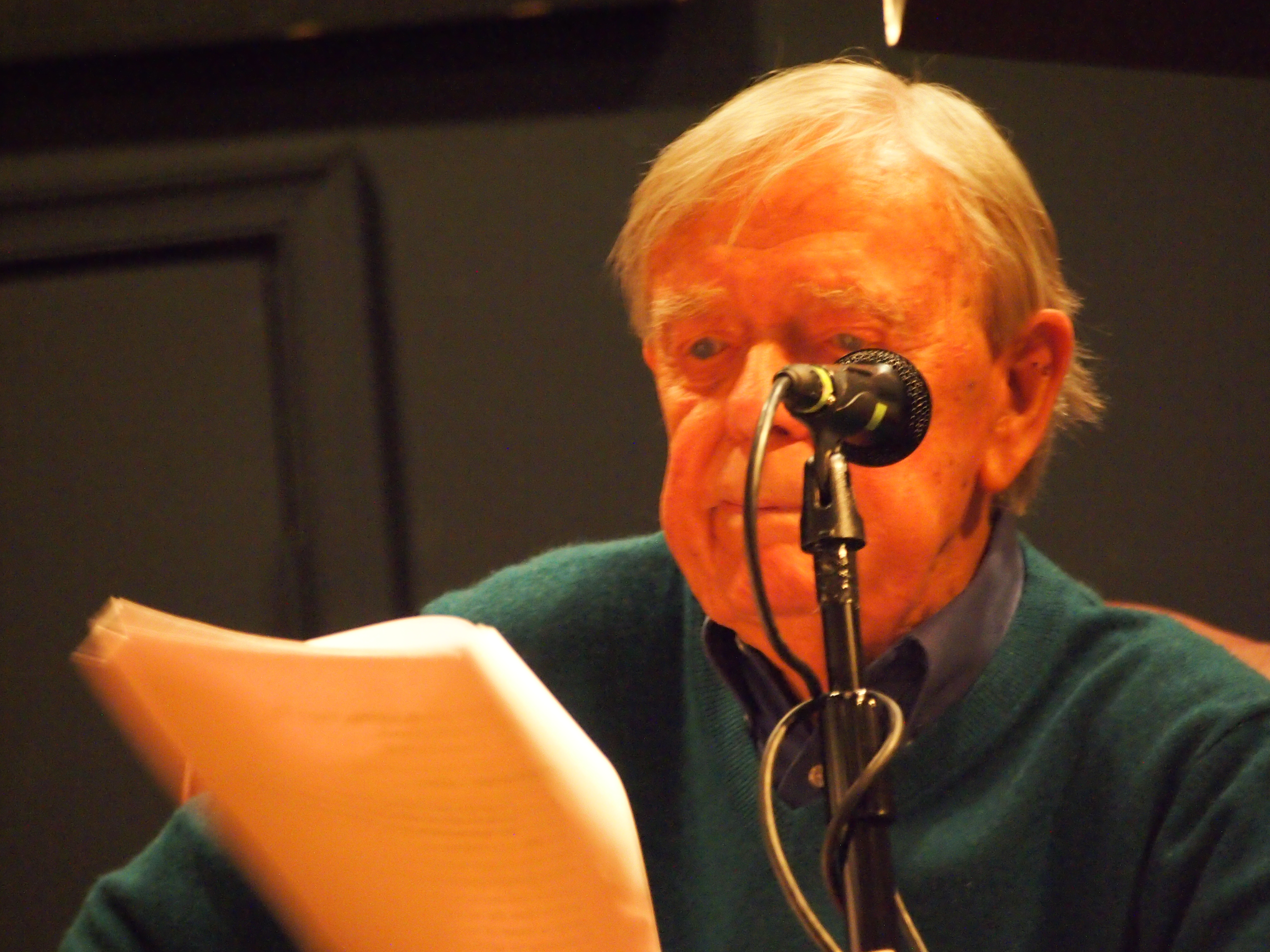
- Born: 1927
- Died: 2018 (aged 90–91)
- Education: Calvin College, University of Edinburgh

Rod Jellema (1927–2018) was an American poet, teacher, and translator.

== Life ==
Jellema held a B.A. from Calvin College and a PhD from the University of Edinburgh (Scotland). He began teaching at the University of Maryland, College Park in 1955, where he founded and directed the creative writing program. At the time of his death, he was professor emeritus.

He was the author of five books of poetry and three translations. His work was awarded the Hart Crane Memorial Poetry Contest, the Pieter Jelles Prize (Piter Jellespriis) (Friesland) and a Columbia University Translation Prize for his translations of Frisian poetry. He was the recipient of fellowships from the National Endowment for the Arts, and Yaddo. His work appeared in various publications including Atlanta Review, Beltway Poetry Quarterly, Field, Many Mountains Moving, Plum Review, and Poet Lore.

He divided his time between Washington, DC, San Juan, Puerto Rico, and the Lake Michigan dunelands near Montague, Michigan.

He had been working on an early history of New Orleans jazz titled Really Hot: A New Hearing for Old New Orleans Jazz (co-authored with the late Gordon Darrah).

== Bibliography ==
Poetry

- Incarnality: The Collected Poems of Rod Jellema (Eerdmans 2010)
- A Slender Grace: Poems (Eerdmans, 2004)
- The Eighth Day: New & Selected Poems (Dryad Press, 1984)
- Something Tugging the Line (Dryad Press, 1974)
- The Lost Faces (Dryad Press), 1979

Translations

- The Sound That Remains: A Historical Collection of Frisian Poetry (Eerdmans, 1990)
- Country Fair: Poems from Friesland Since 1945 (Eerdmans, 1985)
