= Cliff Wirth =

American cartoonist (1927–2018)

- Born: 1927
- Died: May 8, 2018 (aged 90–91); Bedford, Massachusetts, U.S.
- Resting place: Holy Sepulchre Cemetery, Southfield, Michigan, U.S.
- Education: Michigan State University
- Occupation: Cartoonist
- Spouse: Catherine Lois Francisco
- Children: 4 sons, 3 daughters

Cliff Wirth (1927 – May 8, 2018) was an American cartoonist. He joined the Detroit News in the 1950s, and he worked for the Chicago Sun-Times from 1979 to 2002.

== Selected works ==
- Wirth, Cliff (1995). Stickball, Streetcars & Saturday Matinees. Greendale, Wisconsin: Reiman Publications. ISBN 9780898211511. OCLC 34037472.
