= Bill Smyly =

- Born: William Jocelyn Smyly; 22 July 1922; Peking
- Died: 16 May 2018 (aged 95); Bedford, England
- Military career
- Allegiance: United Kingdom
- Branch: British Army
- Service years: 1942–1946
- Rank: Captain
- Units: 2nd King Edward VII's Own Gurkha Rifles (The Sirmoor Rifles), 3 Gorkha Rifles
- Conflicts: World War II; Chindits Operation Longcloth; Chindits Operation Thursday
- Awards: Mentioned in dispatches

William Jocelyn Smyly (22 July 1922 – 16 May 2018) was a soldier, journalist and educator. He was one of the last veterans of the two Chindit expeditions in the Burma campaign.

== Early life ==
Bill Smyly was born in Peking and was educated at Wrekin College and joined the Army straight from school.

== Soldier ==
Bill Smyly took part in two of the Chindits operations behind enemy lines in Burma. On the first one he made a hard-won escape after being separated from his unit.

== After the war ==
After the war he went up to Clare College, Cambridge, reading History and English. He then became a journalist. After a stint in the UK he moved to Hong Kong working at the South China Morning Post. Then he took up Education, working at the Diocesan Boys' School, and eventually at the Chinese University of Hong Kong. After taking a post graduate degree at Leeds University he joined the British Council.
