= Marjet Van Puymbroeck =

Belgian politician (1921–2018)

Marjet Van Puymbroeck (28 March 1921 – 21 May 2018) was a Belgian politician, who was a member of both the Senate and the Flemish Parliament between 1981 and 1987.
