= Alf O'Rear =

American politician (1923–2018)

Member of the Tennessee House of Representatives from the 5th district
- In office 1967–1968

Personal details
- Born: February 25, 1923 Chattanooga, Tennessee, United States
- Died: May 4, 2018 (aged 95)
- Party: Democratic
- Occupation: lawyer

Alf Rhea (Tony) O'Rear (February 25, 1923 – May 4, 2018) was an American politician in the state of Tennessee. O'Rear served in the Tennessee House of Representatives from 1967 to 1968. A Democrat, he represented the 5th district (Hamilton County, Tennessee) and worked as a lawyer.
