= Christine Beattie =

American developmental neurobiologist (1965–2018)

- Born: January 2, 1965
- Died: May 28, 2018 (aged 53)
- Scientific career
- Fields: Neurobiology

Christine Beattie (2 January 1965 - 28 May 2018) was an American developmental neurobiologist.

Christine obtained a bachelor in chemistry and did her PhD in neuropharmacology at Case Western Reserve University. She continued as a postdoctoral researcher at the University of Oregon in the laboratory of Judith Eisen, where she began working on motoneuron development using the model organism zebrafish.

She became a professor in the Department of Neuroscience at The Ohio State University. During her 20 years of tenure she made important contributions to the fundamental biology of neuromuscular junctions using the model organism zebrafish.

Since 2019, the International Zebrafish Society has awarded the Christine Beattie Award in her honor to outstanding presenters at the International Zebrafish Conference.
