= Yrsa Stenius =

Swedish journalist

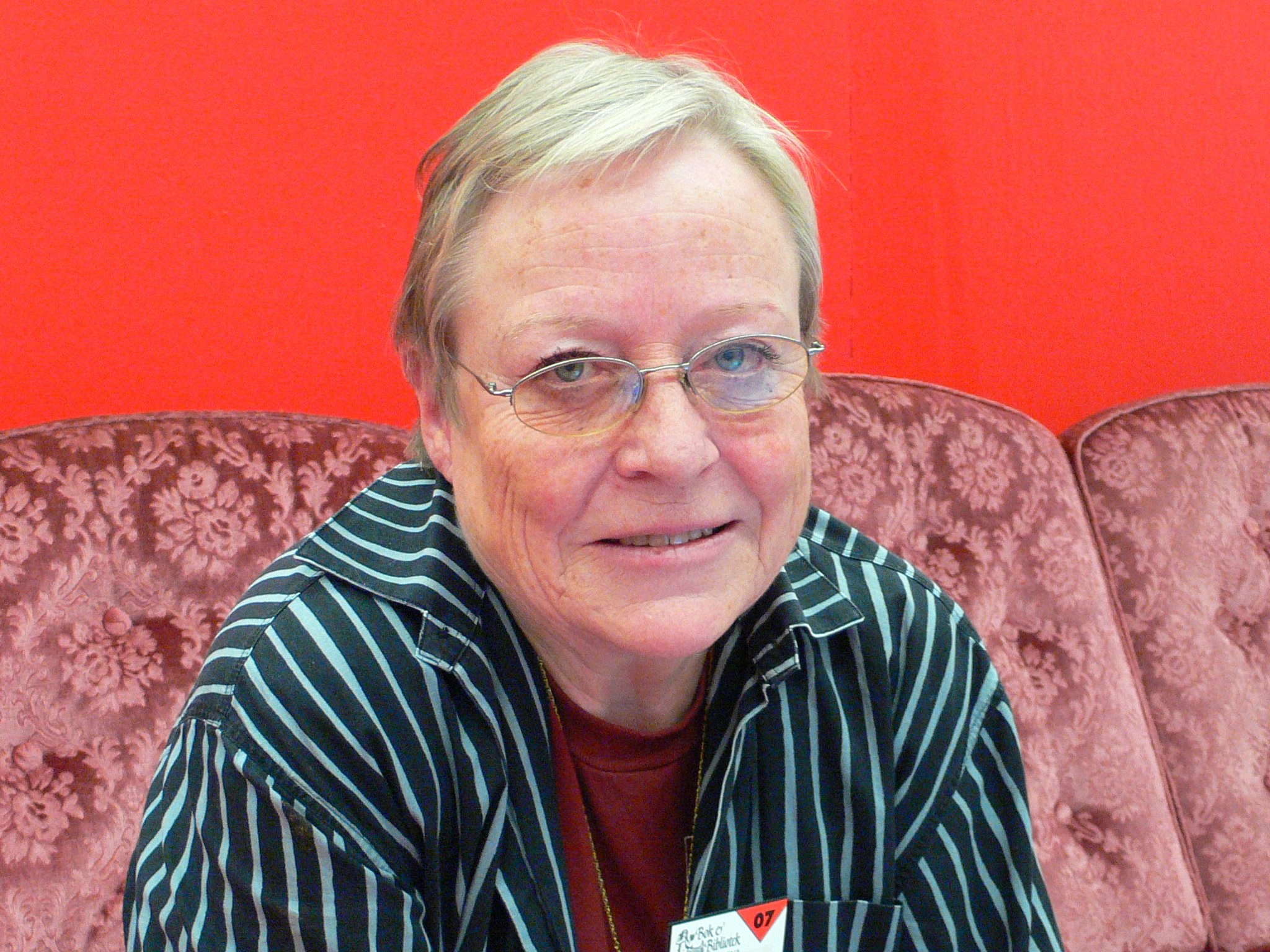
- Yrsa Stenius during the Göteborg Book Fair in September 2007
- Born: 7 January 1945; Helsinki, Finland
- Died: 18 May 2018 (aged 73); Stockholm, Sweden
- Education: University of Helsinki
- Occupations: journalist and newspaper editor, non-fiction writer
- Employer: Aftonbladet
- Notable work: Tills vingen brister
- Parent(s): Olof Gunnarson Stenius and Dorle von Wendt
- Awards: Society of Swedish Literature in Finland prize (1977); State Prize for Literature (1981)

Yrsa Carola Stenius (7 January 1945 – 18 May 2018) was a Finnish born Swedish journalist and newspaper editor.

She was born in Helsinki to architect Olof Gunnarson Stenius and actress Dorle von Wendt. She passed her matriculation exam in 1964 and studied literature and philology at the University of Helsinki. In 1968, she was editor-in-chief of Studentbladet. She was chief editor of the newspaper Arbetarbladet from 1972 to 1978, having also served as its editorial secretary from 1969 to 1972 and acting chief editor in 1972. From 1979 she was cultural editor for the newspaper Aftonbladet and was appointed chief editor for the newspaper from 1982 to 1987. She was a recipient of a prize from the Society of Swedish Literature in Finland in 1977 and the State Prize for Literature in 1981. She has written biographies of Jussi Björling and Albert Speer, with her book on Speer titled Jag älskar mig. Gåtan Albert Speer (1980), and other books include I väntan på vadå (1976), Makten och kvinnligheten (1993) and Lögnens olidliga lättnad (2005).

She died on 18 May 2018 at 73 years old.
