= 2018 Scottsdale shootings =

Spree shooting in Arizona, U.S.

- Location: Scottsdale, Arizona, United States
- Date: May 30–June 4, 2018; 05:20 pm EDT
- Attack type: Spree shooting and mass shooting
- Weapons: .40-caliber Glock 22 pistol; .22-caliber Beretta pistol (unused)
- Deaths: 7 (including the perpetrator)
- Injuries: 0
- Perpetrator: Dwight Lamon Jones

Between May 30, and June 4, 2018, six people were killed in a spree shooting in Scottsdale, Arizona, United States.. The shooter, 56-year-old Dwight Lamon Jones, killed himself as police closed in on his location.

== Shootings ==
The victims of the initial shootings were shot within 24 hours of each other and within a 10-mile (16 km) radius in Scottsdale and Phoenix. The other two victims were discovered June 4.

Steven Pitt, aged 59, a well-known forensic psychiatrist, was shot and killed outside his office at 5:20 pm on Thursday, May 31. Pitt had examined Jones in connection with a "bitter" divorce. In 2006, Pitt helped the police identify the Baseline killer who had raped and murdered a series of women in Phoenix.

Veleria Sharp (aged 48) and Laura Anderson (aged 49), both paralegals, were shot dead at 2:15 pm on Friday, June 1, in the downtown Scottsdale offices of Burt, Feldman, Grenier, the law firm where they worked. Sharp had been shot in the head, and she ran out into the street for help and then collapsed, and was pronounced dead at the hospital. Lawyers at the firm had worked on the Jones divorce. By 11:30 pm on Friday, June 1, police knew that the same gun had been used to kill Anderson, Sharp and Pitt.

The body of 72-year old Marshall Levine, a psychologist and counselor, was found just after midnight, as Friday turned to Saturday, June 2, in his Scottsdale office. Levine was subletting his office from a woman who had provided counseling services to his son during the divorce, Jones' intended target.

By Sunday afternoon, police had Jones under surveillance as he drove around Fountain Hills in his gold Mercedes Benz. At one point, Jones ditched a small bag containing a .22-caliber pistol, which police later determined to belong to one of two people, 70-year-old Mary Simmons and her husband, 72-year-old Bryon Thomas, who were shot and killed inside a Fountain Hills home. They had no connection to the divorce case but may have been acquaintances of Dwight Jones. Their bodies were not discovered until June 4. Police stated that ballistics ruled out the .22-caliber gun from having been used in any of the shootings.

== Investigation ==
The break in the investigation came when Jones' ex-wife issued a statement saying her current husband, a retired Phoenix police detective, "recognized the connection to my divorce and the three crime scenes and he notified the Phoenix Police violent crime unit on Saturday (June 2) night." Once Jones was made a suspect, a DNA sample was obtained from a relative of Jones and matched to a DNA sample from a recovered shell casing.

== Perpetrator ==
The perpetrator was identified as 56-year-old Dwight Lamon Jones who had previously been arrested. According to Rich Slavin, an assistant chief with the Scottsdale Police Department, Jones was arrested in 2008 or 2009 on charges of domestic violence, alleging that he mistreated his wife and a child. Jones had been living at Extended Stay hotels for the past nine years. He committed suicide before he was apprehended.

His former wife told reporters that she "feared for [her] safety for the past nine years." She also said, "He was a very emotionally disturbed person as the court records will confirm." Less than a week before the spree killings Jones used social media to attempt to bring forward allegations that his ex-wife was the abuser and not Jones. Jones created almost 10 hours of content outlining what he viewed as a conspiracy by his ex-wife, psychiatrists, lawyers and the Maricopa County Judicial system to rig a divorce and custody case to steal his son from him.
