= Aircraft maintenance engineer (disambiguation) =

Aircraft maintenance engineer may refer to:

- An aircraft maintenance technician in general
- The Aircraft Maintenance Engineer licensed qualification
- Aircraft maintenance engineer (Canada)
