= Akram Monfared Arya =

Iranian-born Swedish aircraft pilot

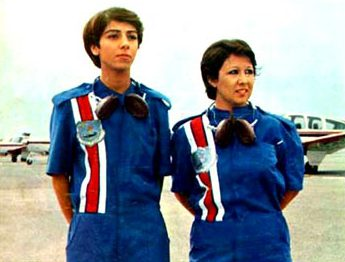
- Akram Monfared (R) One of the earliest women to have a pilot's license in Iran with Sāsān-dokht Sāsāni (L)
- Born: 1946 (age 79–80); Tehran, Iran
- Website: http://www.arya.se

Akram Monfared Arya is an Iranian-born Swedish aircraft pilot, the second woman to earn a pilot's license to fly aircraft in Iran, after Princess Fatemeh Pahlavi. She is a writer, artist and politician based in Stockholm, Sweden.

== Aviation ==
She was born in Tehran in 1946. In 1974, while married and with five children, Akram Monfared Arya began taking lessons in gliders at the Royal Aviation Club (Nowadays: Civil Aviation Technology College ) in Doshan-Tapeh. Located next to the Air Force Base, Doshan-Tapeh was filled with students interested in learning to fly. After receiving her glider license, she went to the Ghaleh-Morghi School of Flight in October of the same year to take lessons in single and twin-engine aircraft. She started her training with the Cessna 172 and after only 14 hours of flight, she completed her first solo flight.

Her next phases of training consisted of night and long-distance flights to several cities such as Tabriz, Kermanshah, Ahwaz, Isfahan and Rasht. In a period of four years, she flew 150 hours with an instructor and 50 hours solo both day and night time.

In addition to following the practical training phase, she attended a ground school where she took subjects like aerodynamics, engines, precision instruments, meteorology, navigation, and English. Upon obtaining her license, she received two job offers: a flight instructor at the Royal Aviation Club and a co-pilot for twin-engine planes with the Air-Asseman Airline. However, she could not pursue a career or further her training in this field due to the revolution in Iran. Later on in 1989 and while living in Sweden, she took flying lessons along with theory lessons at Bromma Flight School, (Bromma Flygskola), in Stockholm and received her Swedish pilot's license.

== Writing ==
Akram Monfared Arya left Iran in 1985 during the Iran–Iraq War, as a refugee with her children and relocated to Sweden.

In 1998, a new chapter in her life began as she assembled a collection of her romantic poems and short stories, which she had started writing in 1975 for publishing purposes. Her first book called Pejvak-e eshq (English: Love's Echo) was published in April 1999 in Sweden. Pejvak-e eshq is a book about separation, homeland, exile, women's political rights, and also about love.

Her second book, Sargozashteh Pari (Pari's memoir) is based on women's subjugation in patriarchies and was published in Sweden in 2000. Another one of her books that deals with issues surrounding women's oppression is a novel called Anahita which was published in Sweden in 2007. The book, inspired by events in the tragic life of a young woman in an abusive relationship, was translated from Swedish to English in 2008 and, eventually published as an eBook in 2016.

In 2013, one of her books was chosen by Legimus (government entity for accessible media—MTM—under the Ministry of culture) in Sweden and published as an audio book.

She has published 15 books in three languages: Persian, Swedish, and English. Her most recent book called En lyckad landning på säker mark: Den farliga flykten från Khomeinis klor till frihetens land Sverige (A successful landing on safe ground: The dangerous escape from Khomeini's claws to the Land of freedom Sweden) is her autobiography which was published in Sweden in early summer of 2012 and translated from Swedish to English in 2013. In her autobiography, she provides an account of her personal life both in Iran and Sweden, and she takes a glance at Iran's history from past to present.

She has participated in many Swedish literary events and poetic contests. She received the second prize in Swedish poetry in February 2000 at Kista Library in Stockholm and in December 2000 in Fisksätra, Stockholm. She is a member of the Association of Swedish Authors.

== Publications ==
- A SONG OF LOVE: POETRY IN CHOICE (First Edition), 2005 ISBN 978-9-163-17520-6
- 2012 - A Successful Landing on Safe Land: Dangerous Escape From Khomeini's Chlorine to the Land of Liberty Sweden (Swedish: En lyckad landning på säker mark: Den farliga flykten från Khomeinis klor till frihetens land Sverige), Publisher: Arya, Location: Stockholm, Sweden, ISBN 978-91-637-0780-3 ISBN 978-9-198-18180-7
- 2007 - Anahita: Based on a True History, Publisher: Recito, Location: Borås, Sweden, ISBN 978-91-85879-10-6
- 2004 - Brinnande Hjärta: Dikter i Urval (English: Burning heart: Selected Poems), Publisher: Invandrarförlaget, Location: Borås, Sweden, ISBN 91-7906-024-2
- 1999 - Pejvak-e eshq or Pizhvāk-i ishq (English: Love's Echo, or Love of Love), Publisher: Akram Āryā, Location: Kista, Sweden, ISBN 91-630-8040-0

== Artwork ==
Akram Monfared Arya began her painting career in 2007 when she attended a painting course at Birkagården College in Stockholm. She later attended art courses at People's University of Amsterdam (Folkuniversitetet), Midsommargården, Folkuniversitetet. Her primary theme in her paintings is based on the situation of women in the world.

=== Exhibitions ===
In July 2007, she was invited to Jokkmokk and Kvikkjokk, along with seven other artists for the celebration of Linnaeus' 300th anniversary. The paintings made as tributes to Linnaeus were donated to Jokkmokk Municipality. Her first joint exhibition was held in Kvikkjokk in July 2007 with seven other artists. In January 2008, she held a second joint exhibition at Husby Arts Hall in Husby, Stockholm. In July 2008, she had her first solo exhibition at Gallery Kocks in Stockholm, exhibiting 52 oil, acrylic, watercolor, and charcoal paintings on canvas and paper.

In November 2008, she had a second exhibition at Lyxigt & Mysigt Gallery in Hammarby Sjöstad. In 2009, she held 3 exhibitions in March, August, and October at Gallery RICA in Östermalm, Gallery Darling in Södermalm, and Gallery Törnfågeln in Västertorp respectively. In the spring of 2010, she held two more exhibitions one at Luma Library in Hammarby Sjöstad and one, which was held in collaboration with the Breast Cancer Association (BRO), at Gallery Ängel in Gamla Stan.

In January 2012 and following an interview with Sjöstadsbladet newspaper in the fall of 2011, Akram Monfared Arya held another gallery at Sjöstadsbladets Redaktion locale.

As one of the ambassadors for the National Association against honor related violence (GAPF) and in collaboration with GAPF, Akram Monfared Arya held an art gallery at Gallery Ängel in October 2015.

== See also ==
- Women in Iran
- List of Iranian women
- Effat Tejaratchi, the first Iranian woman aviator to fly a plane.
