= Anna Maria Moens =

Dutch poet and writer (1775–1832)

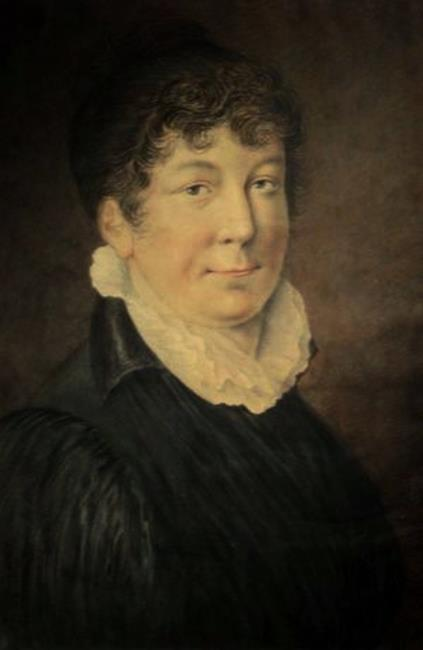
- Born: August 31, 1775
- Died: March 10, 1832
- Occupation: Writer

Anna Maria Moens (August 31, 1775 – March 10, 1832) was a Dutch poet and writer.

== Early life and education ==
Moens was the second child of Maria Margaretha Brunius and Hendricus Moens. Her father was an insurance broker and died in 1788. Her mother remarried in 1790 to a man from Hoorn, where she began writing, drawing and playing music.

== Career ==
In 1795, Moens published her first collection with a writer named Uylenbroek, entitled Poetic reflections on God's providence, death, the grave, the resurrection and other moral subjects. In 1798 she published Description of the religious and moral character of Jesus Christ, and in 1800, The moral reading material at school. Moens also became an honorary member of the Maatschappij tot Nut at this time.

In 1818, Moens moved to Ede and opened a co-ed boarding school, and in the same year received a certificate of general admission as a teacher, for which she had not taken the exam but was still awarded to her for her merits. Girls were allowed to stay at the school until they graduated, and boys until they were twelve. The school was designated by the Provincial Education Commission in Gelderland as one of three boarding schools in Gelderland that was suitable for training female teachers. The curriculum mainly centered on instilling various traditional values, such as patriotism and religiousness. In her later years, Moens rarely published her own work, but occasionally translated a religious work or wrote a poem in honor of a special occasion.

Moens fell ill in 1831 and died the following year. After her death, the number of students in the school declined, and in 1838 Moens' successor and former colleague, Charlotta Leinweber resigned.

== Grave monument ==
She was buried in the nearby town of Ede. A number of her students raised money for a grave monument. The monument is known for its inscription, which originally contained several spelling and grammatical errors, presumably written by one of her students and later corrected by grinding away redundant characters.
