= Aircraft maintenance engineer =

Person who is responsible for maintaining aircraft

An aircraft maintenance engineer (AME), also licensed aircraft maintenance engineer (LAME or L-AME), is a licensed person who carries out and certifies aircraft maintenance. The license is widespread internationally and is recognised by the International Civil Aviation Organization (ICAO). The American FAA recognise the qualification in foreign countries but refers to it as aviation maintenance engineer rather than "Aircraft...". Unlicensed mechanics or tradespersons are sometimes informally referred to as "unlicensed AMEs".

Countries which issue or recognize AME licenses internally include Australia, Bangladesh, Canada, India, Ireland, New Zealand, the United Kingdom and much of Asia.

The American equivalent of an AME is an aircraft maintenance technician (AMT), also known as an A&P.

Up until 1998, Type I and Type II aircraft maintenance engineer (AME) licences were distinguished. In 1998 ICAO replaced these with a single AME licence.

In 2005 the relationship between the Canadian AME and the US A&P (AMT) was further revised, through a Bilateral Aviation Safety Agreement (BASA) between the US and Canada.

== See also ==
- Aircraft maintenance engineer (Canada)
- Charles Taylor Master Mechanic Award
- Groundcrew
