= August Ludwig Schott =

German lawyer and professor (1751-1787)

- Born: November 25, 1751; Tübingen, Holy Roman Empire
- Died: April 5, 1787 (aged 35)
- Occupations: lawyer, professor, court counselor in Erlangen
- Parent: Christoph Friedrich Schott

August Ludwig Schott (1751–1787) was a German lawyer and professor.

August Ludwig Schott was a lawyer, solicitor and professor for law in Tübingen and later court counselor in Erlangen.

== Life ==
August Ludwig Schott was the son of Christoph Friedrich Schott, a priest and professor in Tübingen. He studied in Tübingen, matriculated in 1768, then studied law and received a law degree in 1772.

From 1774 on he practiced law in Württemberg, and proceeded to make a name for himself within the academic community. In September 1778 he was named a law professor at the University of Tübingen. In 1781 he was ordained as the fifth law professor at the University of Erlangen, in 1783 he became an advisor in the Brandenburgian government, and in 1784 he returned to his faculty post.

== Publications ==
- Canz, Eberhard Christoph and Schott, August Ludwig: De furto ex necessitate commisso ad art. CLXVI ord. crim. Carol.; 1772
- Schwebel, Nicolaus and Schott, August Ludwig: Natalem Tricesimvm Serenissimi Principis Ac Domini Domini Christiani Friderici Caroli Alexandri Marggravii Brandenbvrgici ...; Onoldi 1765
- Huber, Johann Ludwig and Schott, August Ludwig: Vermischte Gedichte; Erlangen 1783
- Schott, August Ludwig and Dapping, Wilhelm Ludwig: Dissertatio inauguralis iuridica sistens observationes ex iure patronatus ecclesiae pluribus competente, speciatim de praesentatione per turnum; Tubingae 1778
- Schott, August Ludwig and Mühlpfort, F. T.: Diss. inaug. iur. sistens observationes de legibus connubialibus, earumque necessaria emendatione; Erlanga 1782
- Bensen, Carl Daniel Heinrich and Schott, August Ludwig: Materialien zur Polizei-, Kameral- und Finanzpraxis; Erlangen (1803)
- Betonakis, M. N. and Schott, August Ludwig: Syllogē hapantōn tōn nomōn, diatagmatōn, diataxeōn, kanonismōn, kl. tōn aphorōntōn tēn astykēn en genei hygeionomian ...; Athēnēsi 1860
- Betonakis, M. N. and Schott, August Ludwig: Bericht über die Leistungen des Weiblichen (Sievekingschen) Vereins für Armen- und Krankenpflege; Hamburg 1834
- Bensen, Carl Daniel Heinrich and Schott, August Ludwig: Materialien zur Polizei-, Kameral- und Finanzpraxis; Erlangen (1801)
- Bensen, Carl Daniel Heinrich and Schott, August Ludwig: Bericht des in der Generalversammlung gewählten Ausschusses, enthaltend die in der Generalversammlung vorgelegten Jahresberichte der Rheinisch-Westphälischen Gefängnis-Gesellschaft zur Sittlichen und Bürgerlichen Besserung der Gefangenen; Düsseldorf 1829
- Bensen, Carl Daniel Heinrich and Schott, August Ludwig: Instructie voor het bestuur der Spaarbank, opgerigt door de beide Amsterdamsche departementen der maatschappij: tot nut van't algemeen; [S.l.] [1819]
- Bensen, Carl Daniel Heinrich Schott, August Ludwig: Beretning om Bodsfaengslets virksomhed; Christiania 1854
- Bensen, Carl Daniel Heinrich and Schott, August Ludwig: Materialien zur Polizei-, Kameral- und Finanzpraxis; Erlangen (1803)
- Bensen, Carl Daniel Heinrich and Schott, August Ludwig: Beretning om Bodsfaengslets virksomhed; Christiania 1856
- Bensen, Carl Daniel Heinrich and Schott, August Ludwig: Compte rendu; Strasbourg 1866
- Bensen, Carl Daniel Heinrich and Schott, August Ludwig: L' Etat politique et militaire de l'Europe en janv. 1800; Leipsic 1800
- Bensen, Carl Daniel Heinrich and Schott, August Ludwig: Beretning om Bodsfaengslets virksomhed; Christiania 1858
- Nieuwenhuis, A. J. und Schott, August Ludwig: Het Wets-Ontwerp op het Armbestuur in doel en middelen beschouwd door A. J. Nieuwenhuis I deel; Amsterdam 1852
- Buxton, Thomas F. and Schott, August Ludwig: The African Slave Trade and its Remedy; London 1840
- Donckermann, F. H. L. and Schott, August Ludwig: Gedachten over de Noodzakelijkheid en Nuttigheid van een Algemeen Armbestuur; met Aanweizing van heilsame middelen Aegen den voortgang der Armored door F. H. L. Donckermann Met een brief. ...van HW Tydeman; Amsterdam 1849
- Donckermann, F. H. L. and Schott, August Ludwig: Congrès International de Bienfaisance; Wechselnde Verlagsorte 1858
- Courier, Paul-Louis and Schott, August Ludwig: Pamphlet des Pamphlets; Paris 1824
- Cella, Johann Jakob and Schott, August Ludwig: Johann Jakob Cella's freymüthige Aufsätze; Anspach 1785
- Cella, Johann Jakob and Schott, August Ludwig: Congrès International de Bienfaisance; Wechselnde Verlagsorte 1863
- Cella, Johann Jakob and Schott, August Ludwig: Congrès International de Bienfaisance; Wechselnde Verlagsorte 1857
- Dunoyer, Charles und Schott, August Ludwig: De la liberté du travail ou simple exposé des conditions dans lesquelles les forces humaines s'exercent avec le plus de puissance; Paris 1845
- Dutot, S. and Schott, August Ludwig: De l'Expatriation, consideree sous ses rapports economiques politiques et moraux; Paris 1840
- Kopp, ... and Schott, August Ludwig: Einige Worte über Armenpflege geistlichen und weltlichen Vorstehern gewidmet; Luzern 1817
- Ducpetiaux, Édouard and Schott, August Ludwig: De la Condition physique et morale des jeunes ouvriers et des moyens de l'améliorer; Bruxelles (1843)
- Dunoyer, Charles and Schott, August Ludwig: De la liberté du travail ou simple exposé des conditions dans lesquelles les forces humaines s'exercent avec le plus de puissance; Paris 1845
- Bernoulli, Christoph vSchott, August Ludwig: Populationistik oder Bevölkerungswissenschaft; Ulm 1840 [erschienen] 1841
- Kleber, Alexius Anselm and Schott, August Ludwig: Ein Wink an Deutschlands Regenten über die schädlichen Mißbräuche der deutschen Preßfreyheit in Beziehung auf den Staat und dessen Verfassung; Germanien 1800
- Faust, Bernhard Christoph and Schott, August Ludwig: Entwurf zu einem Gesundheitskatechismus für die Kirchen und Schulen der Grafschaft Schaumburg-Lippe; Frankfurt u.a. 1793
- Faust, Bernhard Christoph and Schott, August Ludwig: Spaarbank; Dordrecht [1818]
- Franck, Johann Philipp and Schott, August Ludwig: Johann Philipp Frank's beyder Rechte Doctor und privat Lehrers auf der hohen Schule zu Erlangen System der Landwirthschaftlichen Polizey; Leipzig (1789)
- Garve, Christian and Schott, August Ludwig: Anhang einiger Betrachtungen über Johann Macfarlans Untersuchungen über die Armuth betreffend, und über den Gegenstand selbst, den die behandeln: besonders über die Ursachen der Armuth, den Charakter der Armen, und die Anstalten sie zu versorgen; Leipzig 1785
- Henke, Adolph and Schott, August Ludwig: Zeitschrift für die Staatsarzneikunde; Erlangen 1830
- Bensen, Carl Daniel Heinrich/Schott, August Ludwig: Materialien zur Polizei-, Kameral- und Finanzpraxis; Erlangen (1801)
- Julius, Nicolaus Heinrich and Schott, August Ludwig: Jahrbücher der Gefängnisskunde und Besserungsanstalten; Frankfurt, M. 1845
- Bischoff, Theodor Ludwig Wilhelm and Schott, August Ludwig: Bemerkungen zu dem Reglement für die Prüfung der Ärzte vom 25. September 1869 im früheren nord-deutschen Bunde von Dr. Th. L. W. v. Bischoff; München 1871
- Henke, Adolph and Schott, August Ludwig: Zeitschrift für die Staatsarzneikunde; Erlangen 1833
- Henke, Adolph and Schott, August Ludwig: Kurze Antwort auf die ungeheuchelte Abfertigung des Verfassers der Kritiken und Erinnerungen über die Churfürstlich-Bayerische Verordnung der lyzäistischen und gymnastischen Schulen; Augsburg 1800
- Henke, Adolph and Schott, August Ludwig: Reglement van de Spaarbank, opgerigt door het departement Haarlem, der Maatschappij tot Nut van 't Algemeen; [S.l.] 1819
- Henke, Adolph and Schott, August Ludwig: Waarde ingezetenen van Leyden en Rhynland!; [S.l.] [1818]
- Henke, Adolph and Schott, August Ludwig: Zeitschrift für die Staatsarzneikunde; Erlangen 1824
- Henke, Adolph and Schott, August Ludwig: German Hospital Dalston; London 1846
- John, Johann Dionysius and Schott, August Ludwig: Lexikon der K. K. Medizinalgeseze; Prag 1790
- Brunner, Christoph L. and Schott, August Ludwig: Ueber das Recht des Staats, milde Stiftungen abzuändern; Nürnberg 1799
- Henke, Adolph and Schott, August Ludwig: Zeitschrift für die Staatsarzneikunde; Erlangen 1837
- Haffner, J. D. and Schott, August Ludwig: Feuerpolizei-Ordnung zur Verhütung von Feuersgefahr; Karlsruhe 1846
- Haffner, J. D. and Schott, August Ludwig: Reglement van de Spaarbank, opgerigt door het departement Haarlem, der Maatschappij tot Nut van 't Algemeen; [S.l.] 1829
- Haffner, J. D. and Schott, August Ludwig: Statuten van het Zedelijk Ligcham Charitas; (Amsterdam) (1852)
- Haffner, J. D. and Schott, August Ludwig: Adolph Henke's Zeitschrift für die Staatsarzneikunde; Erlangen 1844
- Avé-Lallemant, Friedrich Christian Benedikt and Schott, August Ludwig: Das deutsche Gaunerthum in seiner social-politischen, literarischen und linguistischen Ausbildung zu seinem heutigen Bestande; Leipzig 1858
- Henke, Adolph and Schott, August Ludwig: Zeitschrift für die Staatsarzneikunde; Erlangen 1823
- Davenne, H.-J.-B. and Schott, August Ludwig: De l'organisation et du régime des secours publics en France; Paris (1865)
- Davenne, H.-J.-B. and Schott, August Ludwig: Verslag van den Staat en de Verrigtingen van het departement Leiden der Maatschappij &quot;tot nut van 't Algemeen&quot; sedert Octb. 1845 medegodelt 22 Oct. 1846 door den Secr. de Breuk; (Leiden) (1846)
- Davenne, H.-J.-B. and Schott, August Ludwig: Bericht über die Leistungen des Weiblichen (Sievekingschen) Vereins für Armen- und Krankenpflege; Hamburg 1838
- Davenne, H.-J.-B. and Schott, August Ludwig: Bulletin international des sociétés de secours aux militaires blessés; Genève 1870
- Davenne, H.-J.-B. and Schott, August Ludwig: Vernieuwd reglement voor de Spaarbank, opgerigt door het departement s'Gravenhage der Maatschappij: tot nut van't algemeen; [S.l.] [1823]
- Henke, Adolph and Schott, August Ludwig: Zeitschrift für die Staatsarzneikunde; Erlangen 1842
- Horn, Wilhelm and Schott, August Ludwig: Das preussische Medicinalwesen; Berlin 1858
- Horn, Wilhelm and Schott, August Ludwig: Verslag van de Algemeene Vereeniging tegen het Pauperisme bij de Arbeidende Klassen van den minder gegoeden Stand; 1861
- Abendroth, ... and Schott, August Ludwig: Bemerkungen über die Armen-Anstalt von 1791 - 1830; Hamburg 1832
- Hesse, Wilhelm Gottlieb and Schott, August Ludwig: D. Wilhelm Gottlieb Hesse, Kurfürstl. Maynzischen Raths ... praktische Abhandlung zu Verbesserung der Feuerspritzen; Gotha 1778
- Hesse, Wilhelm Gottlieb and Schott, August Ludwig: Noch ein Aufruf an Nürnbergs Bürger; S.l. 1800
- Hesse, Wilhelm Gottlieb and Schott, August Ludwig: Adolph Henke's Zeitschrift für die Staatsarzneikunde; Erlangen 1853
- Henke, Adolph and Schott, August Ludwig: Zeitschrift für die Staatsarzneikunde; Erlangen 1840
- Mauritius, Anton and Schott, August Ludwig: Polens Literatur- und Cultur-Epoche seit dem Jahre 1831 in Kürze dargestellt; Posen 1843
- Henke, Adolph and Schott, August Ludwig: Zeitschrift für die Staatsarzneikunde; Erlangen 1828
- Schott, August Ludwig and Meier, Johann L.: Diss. inaug. iur. sistens observationes de legibus connubialibus, earumque necessaria emendatione; Erlanga 1782
- Schott, August Ludwig and Schlemm, Heinrich Justus Ludwig: De auctoritate iuris can. inter Evangelicos recepti, eiusque usu apte moderando; Erlanga 1781
- Bensen, Carl Daniel Heinrich and Schott, August Ludwig: Materialien zur Polizei- Kameral- und Finanzpraxis für angehende praktische Staatsbeamten; Erlangen (1802)
- Bensen, Carl Daniel Heinrich and Schott, August Ludwig: Materialien zur Polizei- Kameral- und Finanzpraxis für angehende praktische Staatsbeamten; Erlangen (1801)
- Bürkli, Johannes and Schott, August Ludwig: Ankündigung einer Ausgabe von J. Bürklis auserlesenen Gedichten, zum Besten der geplünderten durch den Krieg beschädigten Schweizer; [Bern] [1799]
- Bürkli, Johannes and Schott, August Ludwig: Standrede am Grabe des achtzehnten Jahrhunderts; Altona 1800
- Bischoff, Theodor Ludwig Wilhelm and Schott, August Ludwig: Der Einfluss des norddeutschen Gewerbegesetzes auf die Medicin; München 1871
- Büsch, Johann Georg and Schott, August Ludwig: Le Droit des Gens Maritime; Hambourg 1796
- Cella, Johann Jakob and Schott, August Ludwig: Johann Jakob Cella's freymüthige Aufsätze; Anspach 1786
- Bensen, Carl Daniel Heinrich and Schott, August Ludwig: Materialien zur Polizei- Kameral- und Finanzpraxis für angehende praktische Staatsbeamten; Erlangen (1803)
- Piarron de Chamousset, Claude H. and Schott, August Ludwig: Vues D'Un Citoyen; Paris 1757
- Overbeck, Christian Adolph and Schott, August Ludwig: Darf bei milden Stiftungen von der Bestimmung des Testators abgegangen werden?; S.l. 1799
- Bernoulli, Christoph and Schott, August Ludwig: Populationistik oder Bevölkerungswissenschaft; Ulm 1843
- Glen, William Cunningham and Schott, August Ludwig: The consolidated and other orders of the poor law commissioners, and of the poor law board, with explanatory notes...; London 1855
- Cella, Johann Jakob and Schott, August Ludwig: Johann Jakob Cella's freymüthige Aufsätze; Anspach 1784
- Dutot, S. and Schott, August Ludwig: De l'Expatriation, consideree sous ses rapports economiques politiques et moraux; Paris 1840
- Fabricius, Johann Christian and Schott, August Ludwig: Joh. Christ. Fabricii, der Oeconomie und Cameral-Wissenschaften Lehrers, Polecey-Schriften; Kiel (1790)
- Dunoyer, Charles and Schott, August Ludwig: De la liberté du travail ou simple exposé des conditions dans lesquelles les forces humaines s'exercent avec le plus de puissance; Paris 1845
- Schott, August Ludwig and Mayer, J. D.: Diss. inaug. iur. sistens collationem iuris commun. et patrii Onoldini de successione ab intestato; Erlanga 1783
- Schott, August Ludwig: Abhandlung von der vortheilhaften Verbindung der schönen Wissenschaften mit der Rechtsgelehrsamkeit; Tübingen 1775
- Schott, August Ludwig: Einleitung in das Eherecht; Nürnberg 1786
- Schott, August Ludwig: Einleitung in das Eherecht; Nürnberg 1802
- Schott, August Ludwig: August Ludwig Schott's der Weltweisheit und Rechte Doctors, Hochfürstl. Brandenburg-Onolzb. und Culmbachischen Hofraths, ordentl. öffentl. Lehrers der Rechte und Beysitzers der Juristischen-Faeultät auf der friedrich-Alexanders-Universität, auch des königl. bistorischen Instituts zu Göttingen Mitglieds Vorbereitung zur juristischen Praxis; Erlangen 1784
- Schott, August Ludwig and Dieze, Johann Andreas: August Ludwig Schotts der Weltweisheit und Rechten Doctors, Hochfürstl. Brandenburg-Onolzb. und Culmbachischen Hofraths, ordentlich. öffentl. Lehrers der Rechte u. kurzes juristisch-praktisches Wörterbuch als ein besondrer Nachtrag zu seiner Vorbereitung zur juristischen Praxis; Erlangen 1784
