= People's University =

People's University may refer to

- People's University (Bhopal), located in Madhya Pradesh, India
- People's University of Bangladesh, located in Dhaka
- People's University of Amsterdam, located in Holland
- University of Colima, located in Colima, Mexico
- Peoples University of Medical and Health Sciences for Women, located in Sind, Pakistan
- People's University of China (now known as Renmin University of China), located in Beijing
