= Civil Aviation Technology College =

College in Tehran, Iran

Civil Aviation Technology College (CATC College)
- دانشکده صنعت هواپیمایی کشوری
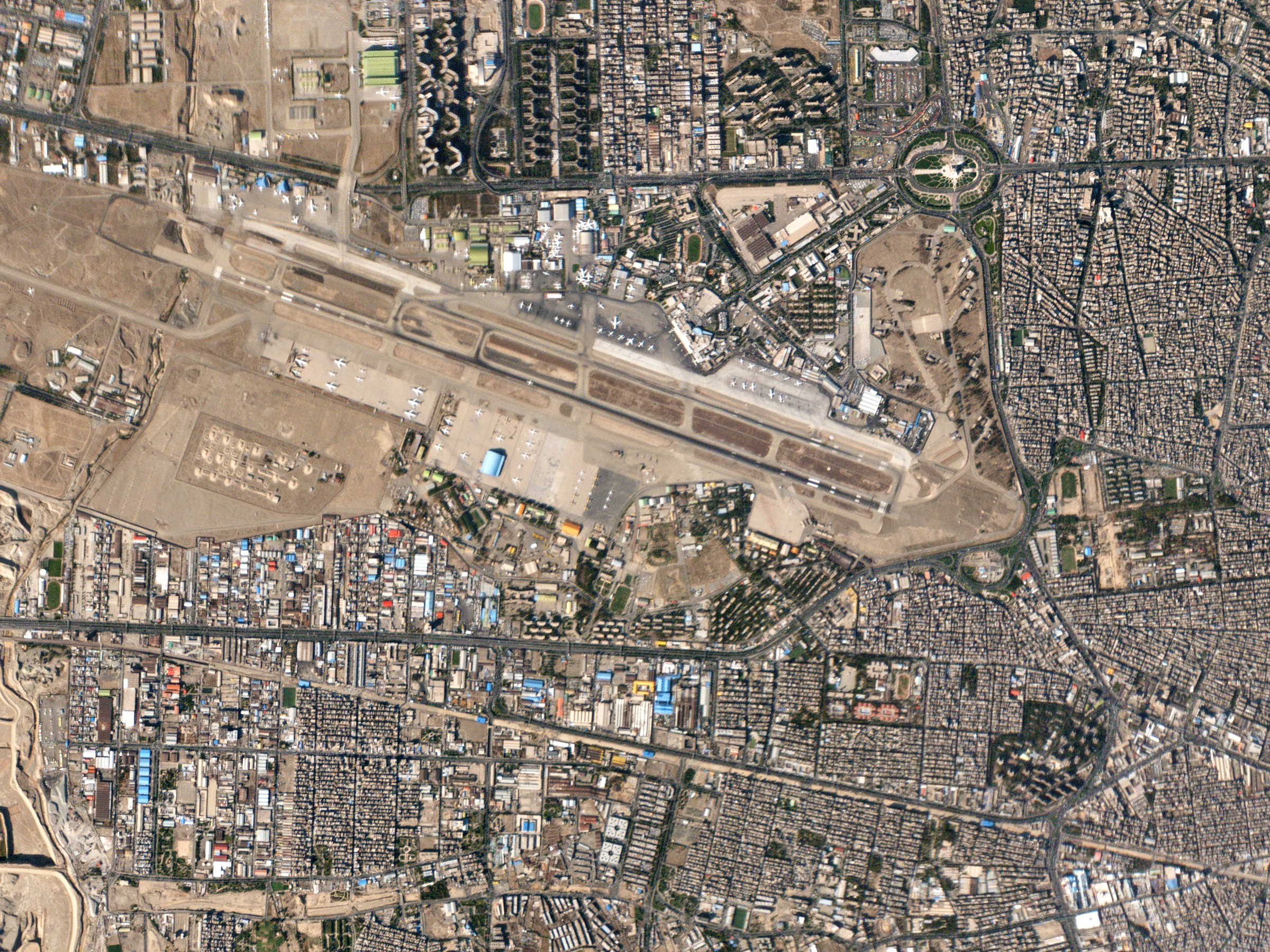
- Type: Public College
- Established: 1938
- Location: Meraj Street, MehrAbad International Airport, Tehran, Tehran, Tehran, Iran; 35°41′21″N 51°18′49″E
- Language: FA, EN
- Colors: Medium Persian Blue; Persian Indigo
- Website: https://www.catc.ac.ir/

Red Point: college location

The Civil Aviation Technology College (CATC College)(Higher Education Center of Civil Aviation and Airports of the country) is the oldest training centre providing specialized manpower needed by Iran's civil aviation industry, It has been operating since 1938 (officially 1940) the order of Reza Shah Pahlavi. The College conducts its training programs in line with rules & regulations of Iranian Ministry of Higher Education. Also, this centre is a member of the Trainer Plus program of the International Civil Aviation Organization known as ICAO.

Also, according to the growing needs of the aviation industry, short-term specialized and in-service courses approved by the Civil Aviation Organization, the International Civil Aviation Organization and the International Air Transport Association are offered in this centre. Civil Aviation Technology College is located on Meraj Street at the Mehrabad International Airport.

== History ==
In general, before the official establishment, the faculty building in the Mehrabad airport area was called the pilot club, which after the approval of the law of the 17th parliament of the National Council in 1941, with the official establishment of the General Directorate of Civil Aviation and the transfer of the administration from the basement of Shams-ul-Amara Palace to Mehrabad Airport, pilot club also came under this administration and the first aviation training complex was officially registered. In 1939, Reza Shah Pahlavi ordered the establishment of a national club for aviation, the cost of which will be provided by the people. The chairman of the board of directors of the club was Qavam-ul-Molk Shirazi, the CEO, Abdullah Yasai, and the vice-chairman of the board of directors, Shaukat-ul-Molk Alam (Minister of Posts and Telegraphs), and other members were: Ali Asghar Hekmat (Minister of the Interior), Sediq Alam (President of Iran Academy), Saham al-Sultan Bayat (Vice Speaker of the National Council), Abbas Masoudi (Representative of the Parliament and Director of the Information Newspaper). About a thousand people registered for pilot training, of which four hundred people participated in the flight with the pilot, and by 1941, twenty-six people were trained and could fly independently. The occupation of Iran in September 1941 stopped the club's work process. Until December 1941, 27,688,452 Rials were paid from Iranians inside and 57.5348 Rials from Iranians abroad for the establishment of the aviation club. The pilot training and sanatorium was under construction at Mehrabad Airport and by December 1941, 284,300 Tomans had been spent.

== Notable alumni ==
Due to the relocation and renaming of this college and the change of teaching disciplines throughout history, people may have studied in disciplines and places that are not currently part of the college now.

- Effat Tejaratchi, the first Iranian female pilot
- Fatimeh Pahlavi, daughter of Reza Shah and her tenth child, pilot
- Houshang Shahbazi, Iranian passenger pilot, flight engineering
- Akram Monfared Arya, Iranian female pilot

== Gallery ==
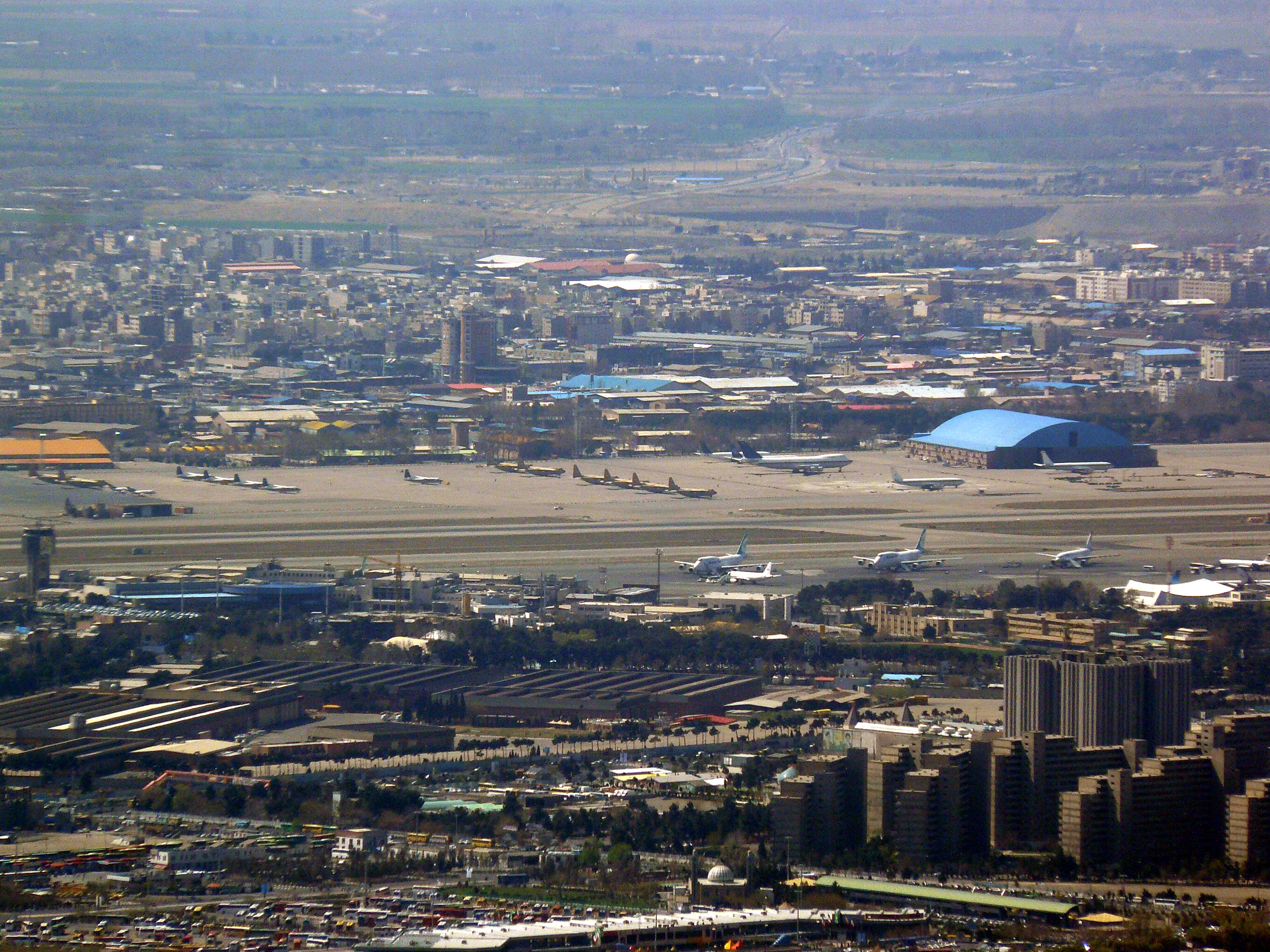
College campus view

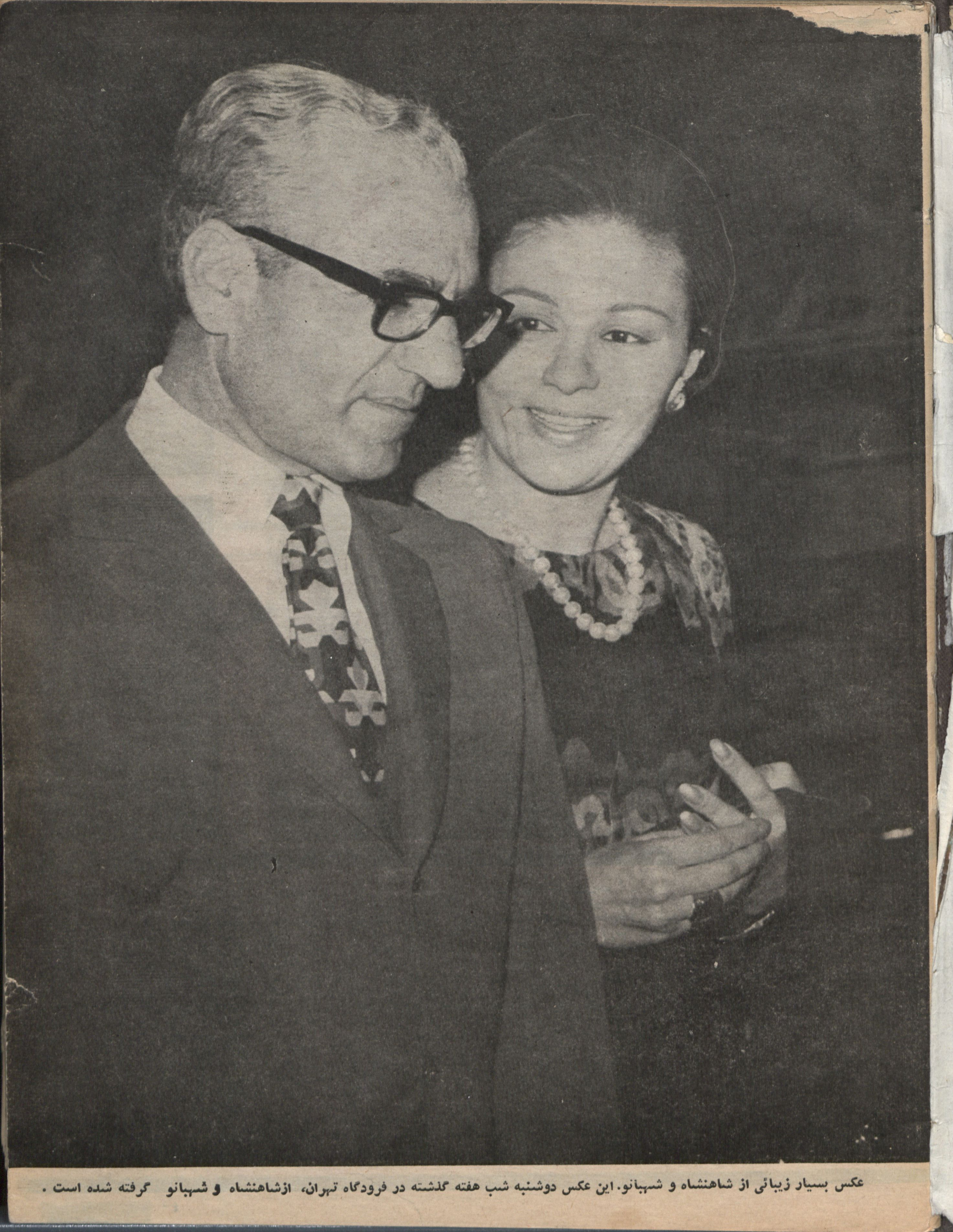
Mohammad Reza Shah and Farah Diba visit Mehrabad airport complex, Civil Aviation Technology College, August 1970

== See also ==
- Aircraft maintenance engineer (Canada)
- Air traffic controller
- Air traffic control
- Telecommunication engineer
- Electronic Engineering
