= Effat Tejaratchi =

First Iranian female aviator

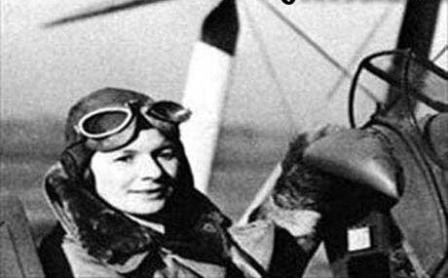
- Born: 1917; Tehran, Iran
- Died: 1999 (aged 81–82)
- Spouse: Dr Mehdi Fayaz Manesh
- Children: 3

Effat Tejaratchi (Persian: عفت تجارتچی effat tejāratchi; 1917–1999) was the first Iranian woman aviator. She was the first Iranian woman to fly an airplane.

Reza Shah Pahlavi ordered the founding of the Iranian Aero Club (Nowadays: Civil Aviation Technology College) in 1939. Tejaratchi, who at the age of 22 had a burning desire to fly, was the first to join the club. She became the first Iranian woman to earn a pilot license in 1940.

== Early life ==
Tejaratchi was born in 1917 in Tehran, Iran. She graduated from high school in 1934 and worked as a French translator, first for the National Bank and then for the library of Tehran's Medical School. Her father encouraged her to take up flying when in those days, only men had a career in flying.

After the Arab invasion of Iran and until early 1930, Iranian women did not have a role in the society. This changed in 1925 when the then Reza Shah Pahlavi took charge. He defied earlier rules of the states and started an effort to modernize Iranian society. As part of this, the Iranian Aero Club was founded in 1939.

== Career ==
In 1939, a group of 9 women enrolled in pilot training program in Iran. In 1940, Tejaratchi became the first to be given a pilot license. She trained with Tiger Moth aircraft.

Tejaratchi joined the Iranian Aero Club and became the first woman volunteer.

On November 18, 1940, she took her first independent flight which lasted for 15 minutes. In September 1941, due to political turmoil the club was closed. At that time, she was training. During her later years, she wrote poems and published them in a book in 1958.

When World War II ended, she returned to flying. The Iranian Royal Air Force hired her as a flight officer and until a short time before the Islamic Revolution of 1979, she served as the director of Aero Club.

She died in 1999 at the age of 82 and was buried in Zahra's Paradise in Tehran.
