= Charles Taylor Master Mechanic Award =

American aviation award

The Charles Taylor Master Mechanic Award is an honor presented by the United States Federal Aviation Administration in honor of Charles Taylor, the first aviation mechanic in powered flight. The award recognizes the lifetime accomplishments of senior aviation mechanics. Taylor served as the Wright brothers' mechanic and is credited with designing and building the engine for their first successful aircraft.

To be eligible for the award, a person must:

- Have 50 years in aviation maintenance as an accredited mechanic or repairman
- Be an FAA-certificated mechanic or repairman for a minimum of 30 years

== See also ==
- List of aviation awards
- Aircraft maintenance
- Aircraft Maintenance Technician
