= Maatschappij tot Nut van 't Algemeen =

Dutch non-profit organization

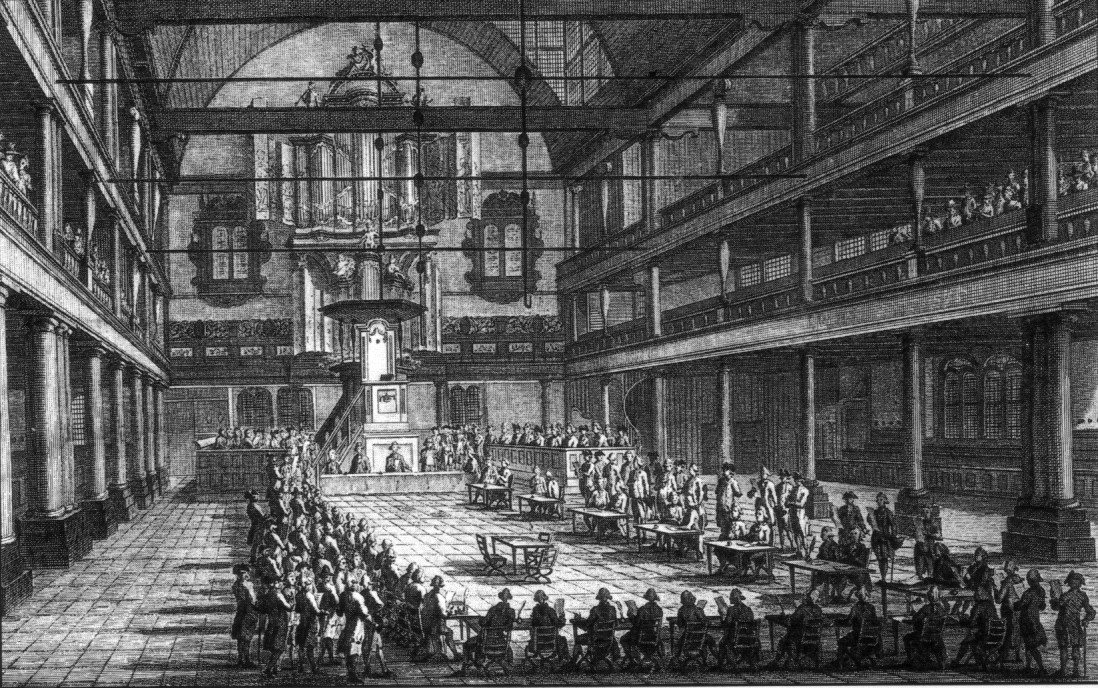
- Meeting of the society in the Old Lutheran Church of Amsterdam, 1791
- Formation: 16 November 1784
- Founder: Martinus Nieuwenhuyzen (1759–93)
- Type: Non-profit
- Legal status: Active
- Services: Education
- Official language: Dutch
- Website: www.nutalgemeen.nl

The Maatschappij tot Nut van 't Algemeen (Nut for short; Society for Public Welfare) is a non-profit organization in the Netherlands founded in 1784 with the purpose of developing individuals and society, primarily through education. It had great influence in improving public education through better textbooks, model schools and teacher's training. The society continues to be involved in extracurricular education.

== Origins ==
At the end of the 18th century, there were many freethinkers and believers in democracy in the Netherlands, who felt that better education would bring greater prosperity for all. A group of friends of the Baptist minister Jan Nieuwenhuijzen from Monnickendam and Edam in North Holland decided to found a society that would help underprivileged people gain education by providing them with books written in simple language. The minister's son, doctor Martinus Nieuwenhuijzen, took the lead in founding a society with the goal of "improving the school system and the education of youth as the main basis for the formation, improvement and civilization of the citizen."

== Foundation ==
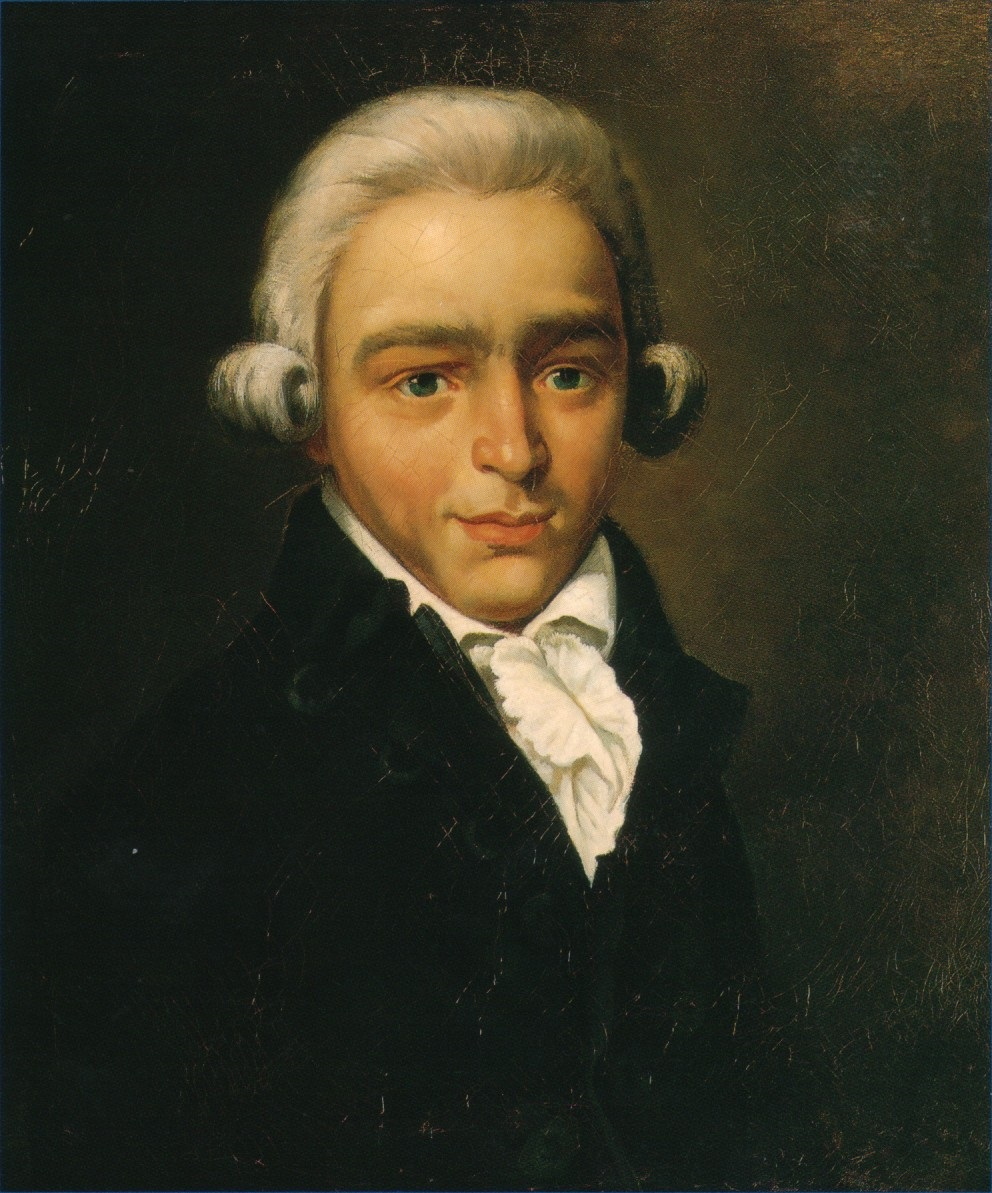
Martinus Nieuwenhuyzen (1759–93)

An inaugural meeting for the Society was held in the minister's house of 16 November 1784. Local branches of the Society were formed in other parts of North Holland, Friesland and Groningen, and then in the rest of the northern Netherlands. Guiding principles were that the organization was humanitarian, run for the public benefit and open to all. Most activity took place at the local level, with a Board at the national level to contribute to public debate and assist the local groups. The objective was not to help the lower classes to rise in social status, but to help them develop and contribute economically and socially to the community. It is hard to estimate how effective the Society was in helping working people, but there is no doubt that the Society was a vehicle for the middle classes to create social networks.

The Society aimed to promote the well-being of the people through higher levels of cultivation and civilization, and specifically through better education. The Society was not against the church, but aimed to provide education that conformed to general Christian ethical principles and that was not dogmatic about doctrine. Thus in 1785 the Society awarded the Catholic Peter Schouten first prize in a contest for a treatise on the existence of God and the need to serve him. Although very liberal, the Society did not willing extend its membership to Jews, or receive Jewish pupils. At first Nut was confined to the mainly Protestant north. The first southern branch was opened in Diksmuide, West Flanders, in 1819, followed the same year with branches in Ostend, Ypres, Nieuwpoort and Bruges, and later by other southern branches. Apart from Ghent, the southern branches were all small. In 1825 there were about 12,000 members in the north and less than 500 in the south.

== Activities ==
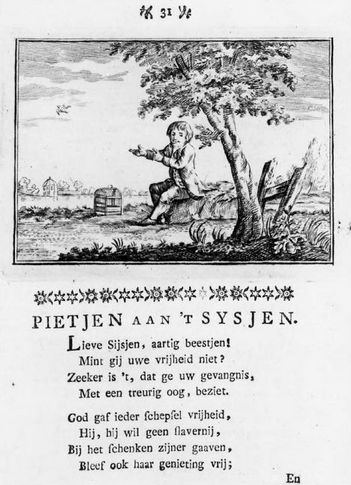
Illustration and poem from a 1785 textbook. A boy frees his pet bird.

The Society aimed to provide education to all by establishing elementary schools, publishing textbooks and founding teacher's training establishments. It also founded libraries, set up savings banks and insurance funds, and undertook other social development activities. While Jan Nieuwenhuijzen saw education of adults as a way to bring them to a higher spiritual level, his son Martinus Nieuwenhuijzen put more emphasis on improving education of children. At the time the state of education was very poor, with under-qualified and underpaid teachers, outdated material, run-down and uncomfortable school buildings and harsh discipline.

The Society at first concentrated on publishing new textbooks. Martinus Nieuwenhuijzen wrote the first of these, written in simple language for children, very different from the turgid style that was fashionable at the time. The Society also founded schools to serve as examples to the public schools of modern methods of education. The Society held an essay competition for the best answer to the question, "What are the best means of turning children into sociable people while they are still at school." One of the answers included a "behavioral table", a scorecard that listed positive and negative actions.

With the proclamation of the Batavian Republic in 1795 the Netherlands became a unitary state and it became possible to enact educational laws for the whole country. Many of the members of the Society were sympathetic to the democratic patriots who led the Batavian Republic. The Society contributed to the law of 1806 which established the national education system. Local branches of the Society founded schools for design in Deventer (1800), Schiedam (1806), The Hague (1809), Haarlem (1809) and Amsterdam (1814). These were mainly concerned with the fine arts, and not with practical arts. After the Act of 1806 the Society became involved in industrial education, but without great enthusiasm. Local branches did set up labor schools including spinning schools in Woerden (1810), Groningen (1814), Middelharnis (1815) and Sommelsdijk (1815), spinning and knitting schools in Leeuwarden and Zwolle, and a flax mill in Nieuwenhoorn.

The Act of 1806 was confirmed by King William I of the Netherlands, with about 1,100 schools established between 1815 and 1830. After the independence of Belgium in 1830 the educational activity of the Society there was taken over in 1851 by Willemsfonds. Under a reform of 1857 the principles of education established by the Society were proscribed for all schools, and the state took responsibility for education throughout the country. In most cases the Society's schools were taken over by the municipalities.

The Society remained involved in education, running vocational schools, organizing courses and pushing for further reforms. Thus in 1875 a committee of the Society published a report on the laws related to primary and secondary education. The report was critical of citizen day schools, which gave courses that did not cover practical work techniques. The committee recommended an overhaul to education for the working classes, with emphasis on vocational training. In 1907 the Society published a report on the apprenticeship system, and recommended craft schools and practical vocational training on the job. In 1913 they founded the Dutch Folk University with its first location in Amsterdam.

Until 2010 the secretariat of the Society was located in the original home of Martinus Nieuwenhuijzen in Edam. The Society continues to operate, with 70 local groups and about 7,000 members as of 2014. It arranges lectures, courses, educational excursions, cultural tours and other cultural activities.

== Sources ==
- Baggerman, Arianne; Dekker, Rudolf Michel (2009-01-01). Child of the Enlightenment: Revolutionary Europe Reflected in a Boyhood Diary. BRILL. ISBN 978-90-04-17269-2.
- Cooman, Guido; Stiphout, Maurice; Wauters, Bart (2003). La négation : une ou multiple ?. Peeters Publishers. ISBN 978-90-429-1370-7.
- "Historie". Maatschappij tot Nut van 't Algemeen.
- Koenen, Hendrik Jakob (1843). Geschiedenis der Joden in Nederland. C. van der Post.
- Morton, Graeme; Morris, Robert John; Vries, B. M. A. de (2006). Civil Society, Associations, and Urban Places: Class, Nation, and Culture in Nineteenth-century Europe. Ashgate Publishing, Ltd. ISBN 978-0-7546-5247-2.
- Weijermars, Janneke (2014-11-21). Stepbrothers: Southern Dutch Literature and Nation-Building under Willem I, 1814-1834. BRILL. ISBN 978-90-04-28243-8.
- Wolthuis, Jan (1999-01-01). Lower Technical Education in the Netherlands, 1798-1993: The Rise and Fall of a Subsystem. Garant. ISBN 978-90-5350-861-9.
