= People's University of Amsterdam =

The People's University of Amsterdam, also known as Volks Universiteit Amsterdam or Folk University, is a course centre for adults in Amsterdam. Volksuniversiteit Amsterdam was founded in 1913 and has multiple study centres in Amsterdam. Since 2016, the Volksuniversiteit Amsterdam has been working together with the Amsterdam Public Library (Openbare Bibliotheek Amsterdam).

== International analogues ==
The American Chautauqua Institution, originally the Chautauqua Lake Sunday School Assembly, was founded in 1874 "as an educational experiment in out-of-school, vacation learning. It was broadened almost immediately beyond courses for Sunday school teachers to include academic subjects, music, art, and physical education".

In the Netherlands the Volksuniversiteit Amsterdam was founded in 1913 by the Maatschappij tot Nut van't Algemeen. Today there are about 61 Volksuniversities. In Flanders they are called Volkshogeschool.

The Freie Deutsche Hochschule (Germany) was founded in Paris on November 19, 1935, as an exile institution. The teaching followed the ideological requirements of the popular front policy. The activities ended with the invasion of German troops in France in 1940. Since 1942, Scandinavia has had the Folkuniversitetet, and in 1959 Slovenia founded the Ljudska Univerza Kocevje.
