= Aircraft maintenance engineer (Canada) =

Technicians who maintain Canadian civil aircraft

In Canada an Aircraft maintenance engineer (AME) is a person who is responsible for signing the maintenance release of certified aircraft and is licensed to do so by the national airworthiness authority, Transport Canada (TC). Their job is to ensure that aircraft are maintained in a safe condition.

The applicant for an AME licence must be at least 21 years old. Aircraft maintenance engineers must complete a training course at a TC approved training organization (ATO), which are mostly Canadian vocational colleges. There are also accepted distance learning courses. A period of apprenticeship prior to writing the licensing examinations is required. Upon successful completion they are granted an AME licence, which is valid for ten years and may be renewed.

AMEs retain their recency by completing maintenance or related work. The Canadian Aviation Regulations require that once the holder's licence is more than two years old that they complete six months worth of work in the previous two years performing or supervising aircraft maintenance, act in an executive capacity in a maintenance organization, or teach or supervise teaching of aviation maintenance at an approved training organization.

== Responsibilities and licensing ==
Under Canadian federal law, the release of maintenance work performed on aircraft in Canada – especially "transport category" fixed-wing aircraft or turbine-powered helicopter aircraft must be accomplished by a person with specific training and licensing. These persons are individually licensed by the Canadian Federal Government through TC and are known as aircraft maintenance engineers or "AMEs". While the term AME is not recognized by the Provincial Engineering Associations, AMEs act on behalf of the Minister of Transport to ensure the safety of the Canadian public with regard to the work performed during maintenance of certified aircraft. The AME is not required to actually conduct the maintenance work they sign for, but must supervise non-licensed personnel or conduct inspections of the work to be signed for to the extent necessary to satisfy themselves that the work was completed correctly.

Not all aircraft maintenance releases require the signature of an AME in Canada. For work on Canadian aircraft conducted outside Canada, a person licensed by another country that has a bilateral agreement with TC may sign. In the case of amateur-built aircraft the owner may sign and for owner-maintenance category aircraft the owner may sign if they are also a licensed pilot. In Canada ultralight aircraft, hang gliders and paragliders as well as model aircraft do not require signatures for release to return to flight. In the case of aircraft parts maintained on the bench (i.e. while removed from the aircraft) persons authorized by an Approved Maintenance Organization (AMO) may also sign the release, whether they hold an AME licence or not. But the maintenance release for the subsequent installation of such parts into an aircraft may only be made by the holder of an AME licence.

Canada has no legal system that requires the person who performs aircraft maintenance to hold a licence. Canada requires that the person who certifies the work has inspected it for accuracy and correct completion. The Canadian AME licence allows the holder to both perform AND to certify their own maintenance work, or to certify the maintenance work performed by an unlicensed person. This type of licence is unlike the system used in the United States of America, whereby the FAA issues licences to persons who perform maintenance work on aircraft as technicians by way of "ratings" (the "airframe" or "powerplant" rating or the combined "airframe and powerplant" rating) and a separate licence to accomplish the "Inspection" certification – the I.A certificate. The US has focused on "the performance of work", while Canada and the other Commonwealth countries make a distinction between actually working on the machines and inspecting them for safety.

=== Ratings ===
The AME licence may be endorsed with one or more ratings. These are:

==== M1 ====
Non-turbojet aircraft, under 19,000 lb (8,618 kg) max takeoff weight, and a passenger capacity of 19 or less.

==== M2 ====
All aircraft not included in M1, excluding balloons, but including all airframes, engines, propellers, components, structures and systems of those aircraft.

Note: Holders of either an M1 or M2 rated AME licence also have maintenance release privileges for all turbine powered helicopters and SFAR 41C aeroplanes, including their associated variants and derivatives.

==== E ====
Aircraft electronic systems, including communication, pulse, navigation, auto flight, flight path computation, instruments and the electrical elements of other aircraft systems, and any structural work directly associated with the maintenance of those systems

==== S ====
Aircraft structures, including all airframe structures.

Note: Holders of BOTH M1 and M2 licence also have the privileges of both the "E" and "S" licences. Some systems (AFCS, HUD, etc.) require specialized training and the licence holder must be current and familiar with the system being signed for.

=== Issuance ===
Upon request of licence issuance, applicants shall include proof of age, training, knowledge, experience and skill as follows:

==== Age ====
Prior to licence issue, the applicant shall have attained the age of 21 years. As proof of age, the following documents are acceptable:

- Canadian citizenship certificates;
- Birth or baptismal certificates;
- Passports; or
- Any Federal or provincial identifying document showing the applicant's birth date.
- Where proof of age cannot be provided by means of a document referred to in any of subparagraphs (i) to (iv), a declaration of age may be accepted in lieu.

==== Training ====
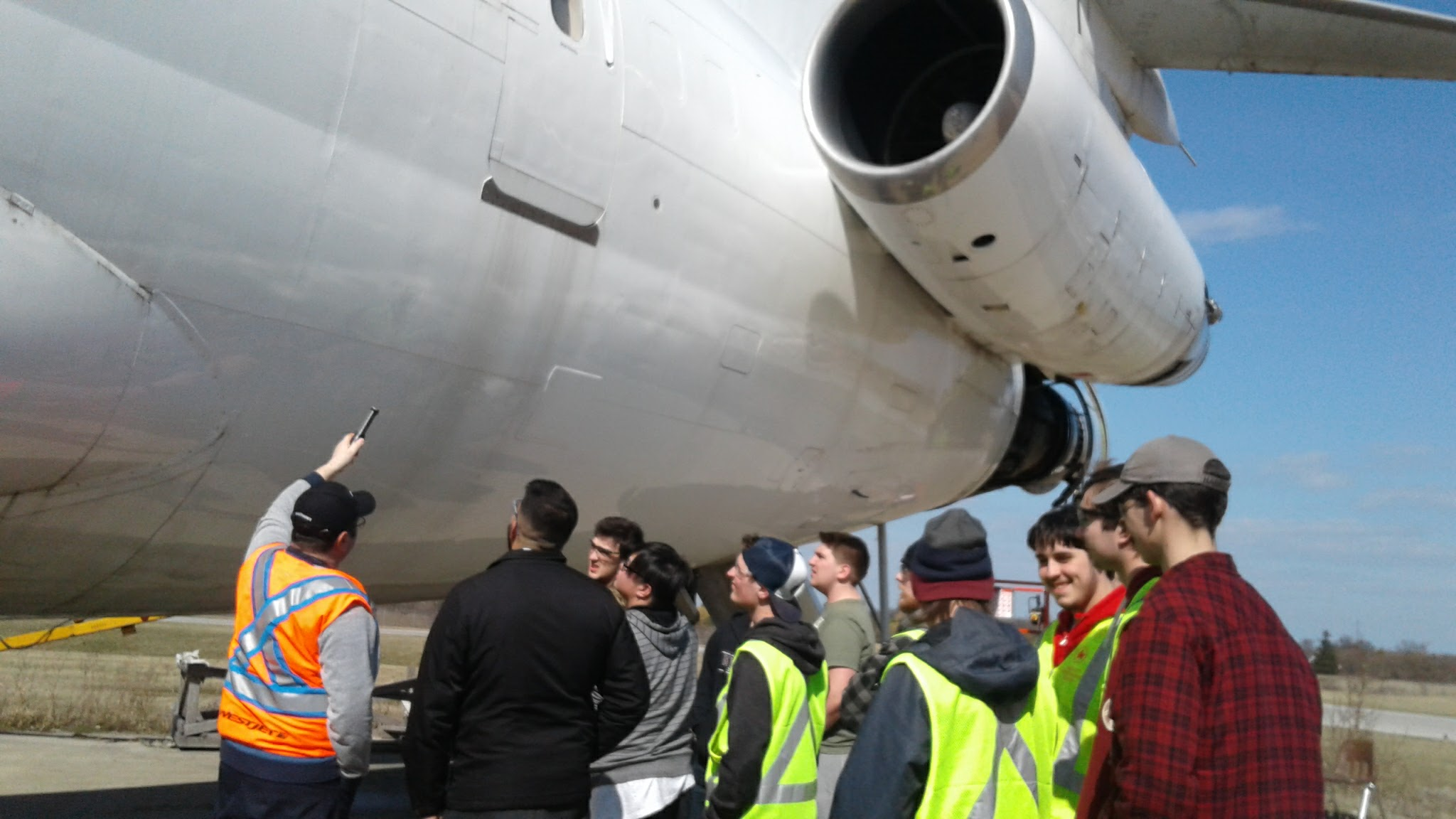
Students of aviation maintenance program evaluating a B727-200 with instructor.

Applicable training may be obtained by means of distance learning courses or traditional college. In any case, the organization has to be approved by Transport Canada.

With some exceptions, an applicant shall successfully complete basic training applicable to the rating. As proof of training, the applicant shall provide a certificate of successful completion of an acceptable aircraft maintenance training course. Where the applicant is seeking experience credit for the training, the certificate shall be issued by an Approved Training Organizations (ATO).

==== Knowledge ====
Transport Canada approved training courses include technical examinations on the subjects covered by the course. Applicants shall successfully complete all the applicable examinations for the subjects concerned, conducted by the ATO in accordance with its approved procedures. As proof, the applicants shall submit a certificate or letter, issued by the ATO, attesting to the successful completion of the examinations.

==== Experience ====
Applicants shall have acquired the applicable amount of total, specialty, and civil aviation maintenance experience set forth in Appendix A. As proof of experience, the applicants shall submit a personal log book or equivalent document signed by the persons responsible for the maintenance release of the work items recorded. At the time of application, the applicants shall have acquired all but six months of the required total experience. Credit toward the total aviation maintenance experience requirement shall be granted for time spent in approved basic training, in the ratio of one month's credit for each 100 hours of training, up to a maximum of:

- 24 months for M or E rating applicants.
- 18 months for S rating applicants.

Therefore, a graduate from an ATO with a curriculum of 1800 hours, would qualify for 18 months credit.

Experience requirements expressed in months are predicated upon full-time employment of 1800 working hours per year. Applicants with part-time experience acquired at a lower rate than this may convert their actual working hours to months at the rate of one month for each 150 working hours, but in no case can a higher rate of work be used to obtain more than one month's credit for each actual calendar month worked.

Maintenance of military aircraft, or parts intended for installation on military aircraft, may be counted toward the total and specialty experience requirements, but not toward the civil aviation experience requirement. Maintenance of ultra-light, advanced ultra-light, amateur built, or owner maintained aircraft, does not qualify for any experience credit.

==== Skill ====
Applicants shall have performed a representative selection of eligible maintenance tasks, over the full range of applicable systems and structures. These tasks must cover at least 70 percent of the items listed in Appendix B that are applicable to the rating sought and to the aircraft, systems or components for which the experience is claimed.

Proof of having completed aircraft maintenance tasks shall take the form of a certification by the AME, or equivalent person who supervised the work. The certification statement shall include the date, aircraft type, registration mark, or component serial number as applicable.

=== Validity and Recency ===
==== Validity period ====
Unless surrendered, suspended or cancelled, an AME licence remains valid until the date indicated on the licence. Transport Canada Advisory Circular (AC) No. 566-003 indicates that the licence is valid for ten years calculated after the applicant's last birthday. As of June 2021 the Canadian Aviation Regulations still indicate a six-year validity period.

==== Recency requirements ====
No person shall exercise the privileges of an AME licence unless, within the preceding 24 months; they have successfully completed the regulatory requirements examination, or have, for at least six months:

- Performed aircraft maintenance;
- Supervised the performance of maintenance, either directly or in an executive capacity; or
- Provided aviation maintenance instruction within an ATO, or an approved training program in an AMO or directly supervised the delivery of such instructions.

An AME who attempts the regulatory requirements examination as required by subsection 566.05(1) and fails will not be entitled to renewal until the examination has been successfully completed.

== Professional status ==
The issue of the divided loyalty that is inherent upon the Canadian AME as both a private sector work performer and a Ministerial delegated certifier, of their own work and of others', was the focus of a 1988 report, which noted that in contrast to some other countries which had done so, "...there is a need in Canada to develop our own perspectives on the phenomenon of inspection."

The Aircraft Maintenance Engineers of Canada/Techniciens D'Entretien 'D'Aeronefs du Canada (AMEC/TEAC) is the professional association for AMEs at national level. AMEC/TEAC is financed by the six regional associations; Atlantic, Quebec, Ontario, Central, Western and Pacific. It changed its name in 2019 from the Canadian Federation of Aircraft Maintenance Engineers Associations, (CFAMEA).

The Aircraft Maintenance Engineers qualification and license were instituted in 1920 when the Canadian Air Regulations introduced Air Engineers and Air Engineer certificates into Canadian Aeronautics law. The first AME license issued in Canada, Air Engineer License #1, was issued on the 20th of April 1920 to Mr. Robert A. McCombie by the Canadian Air Board.

== See also ==
- Aircraft maintenance
- Aircraft maintenance engineer
- Aircraft maintenance technician
- Groundcrew
