= Aircraft maintenance technician =

Profession and licensed qualification

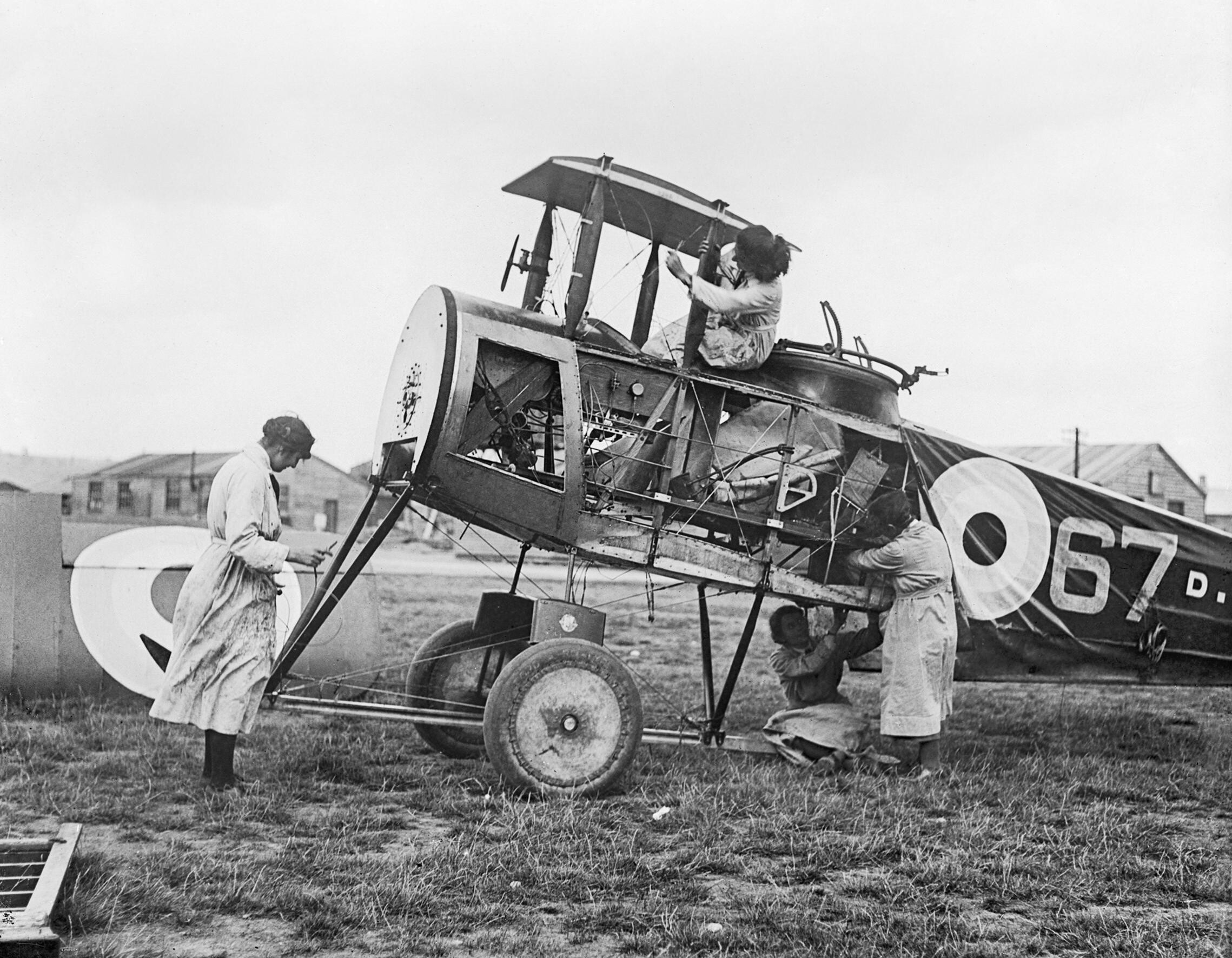
Air Mechanics of the Women's Royal Air Force (WRAF) working on the fuselage of an Avro 504 aircraft, 1918

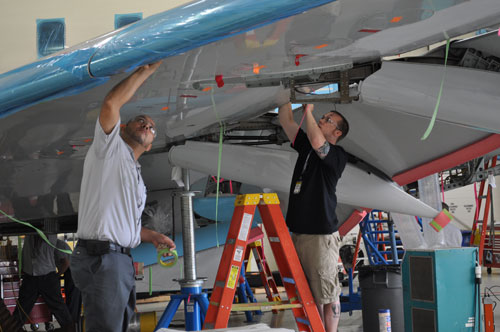
Technicians work on the mechanisms underneath a wing.

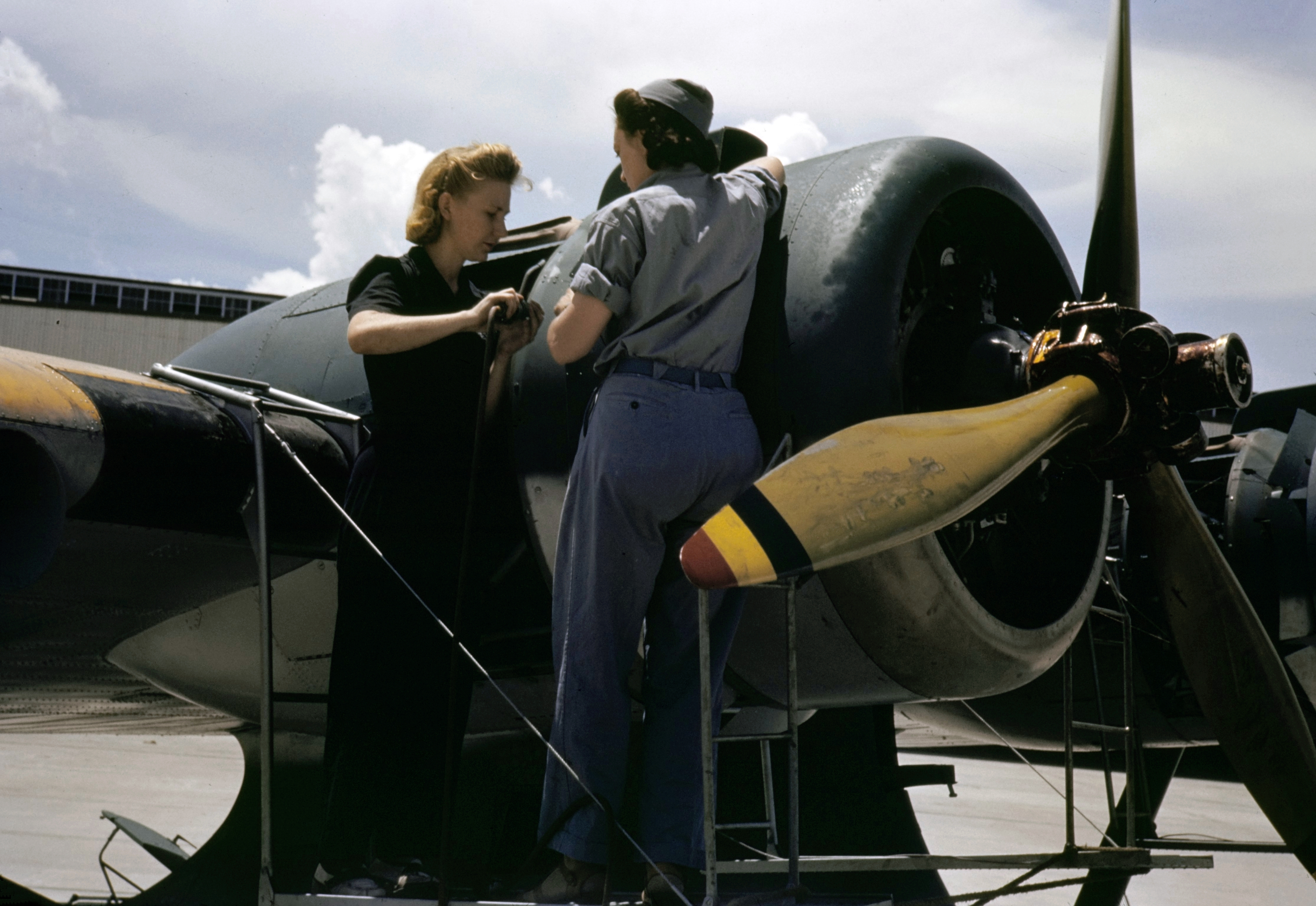
Two technicians servicing the engine of a Consolidated PBY Catalina, August 1942

An aircraft mechanic, aviation mechanic or aircraft maintenance technician (AMT) is a tradesperson who carries out aircraft maintenance and repairs. AMTs inspect and perform or supervise maintenance, repairs and alteration of aircraft and aircraft systems.

For a person who holds a mechanic certificate issued by the Federal Aviation Administration, the rules for certification, and for certificate-holders, are detailed in Subpart D of Part 65 of the Federal Aviation Regulations (FARs), which are part of Title 14 of the Code of Federal Regulations. The US certification is sometimes referred to by the FAA as the Aviation Maintenance Technician and is commonly referred to as the Airframe and Powerplant (A&P).

== Certification ==
In the U.S., the general requirement for eligibility for a mechanic certificate include the following. The candidate must:

- Be 18 or older
- Be able to read, write, speak, and understand the English language.
- Meet the experience or educational requirement; and
- Pass a set of required tests within a maximum of 24 months.

The required tests include a set of knowledge tests, followed by a practical test, which includes an oral examination component, and which is administered by a Designated Mechanic Examiner (DME).

A person who fulfills the necessary requirements is issued a mechanic certificate with either an airframe or powerplant rating, or both. These ratings together account for the common practice of referring to mechanics as "A&Ps." Until 1952, instead of the Powerplant rating, an Engine rating was issued, so the abbreviation "A&E" may appear in older documents.

Eligibility for the mechanic tests depends on the applicant's ability to document their knowledge of required subject matter and ability to perform maintenance tasks. The FAA recognizes two ways of demonstrating the needed knowledge and skills: practical experience or completion of a training program at a school certificated under Part 147 of the FARs.

== Industry competitions ==
The AMT Society presents the annual maintenance skills competition, which recognizes top AMT teams across all aviation including commercial and military.

== Applications based on experience ==
Applicants for a mechanic certificate with a single rating—either airframe or powerplant—and who base their application on practical experience must demonstrate 18 months of work experience applicable to the chosen rating. Those applying for both ratings must show a total of 30 months of applicable experience. The United States military provides an opportunity to gain practical experience, and there is a simple process of obtaining eligibility from military experience to earn an Airframe and Powerplant License as long as the members careers meet the required career specialty codes or MOS.

=== Applications based on education ===
Applicants who attend an aviation maintenance school program certificated under Part 147 study an FAA-approved and supervised curriculum. Those applying for a mechanic certificate with a single rating—either airframe or powerplant—study a "general" set of subjects for at least 400 hours, as well as at least 750 hours of material appropriate to the chosen rating, for a total of 1,150 hours. Those who pursue both ratings study the "general" material, as well as the 750 hours for each rating, for a total of at least 1,900 hours. Completion of such a program of study typically requires between 18 and 24 months.

Required areas of study in the "general" curriculum include electricity, technical drawings, weight and balance, hydraulics and pneumatics, ground operation of aircraft, cleaning and corrosion control, basic mathematical calculations, forms and record-keeping, basic physics, maintenance manuals and publications, and applicable federal regulations. Thorough knowledge of FAA rules and regulations (especially with regard to accepted repair/modification procedures) is also expected of A&P mechanics.

Required areas of study in the airframe curriculum include inspection, structures—wood, sheet metal, composite—and fasteners, covering, finishes, welding, assembly and rigging, hydraulics, pneumatics, cabin atmosphere control systems, instrument systems, communication and navigation systems, fuel systems, electrical systems, position and warning systems, ice and rain control systems, and fire protection systems.

Required areas of study in the powerplant curriculum include inspection, reciprocating and turbine engine theory and repair, instrument systems, fire protection systems, electrical systems, lubrication systems, ignition and starting systems, fuel metering systems, fuel systems, induction and airflow systems, cooling systems, exhaust and reverser systems, propellers, unducted fans, and auxiliary power units.

== Inspection authorization ==
Some AMTs, after at least three years of working in their field, choose to acquire an inspection authorization (IA), which is an additional rating added on to the individual's mechanic certificate. These individuals are allowed to perform annual inspections on aircraft and sign off for return to service on major repairs and alterations on the required block of the FAA form 337. Certification and limitations, including renewal requirements, of mechanics with inspection authorization is contained in 14 CFR Part 65.

The requirements for obtaining an inspection authorization is that the AMT must be licensed for a minimum of three years and actively exercising the rights of an A&P for the two years prior to the date that the IA examination is to be taken.

Renewal of the IA rating must be done every two years (on odd years) by submitting to the FAA a form showing a minimum of activity in which the IA exercised his or her authority. This activity comprises either annual inspections, major repairs, major alterations, or a minimum of 8 hours of FAA approved training. This activity must be accomplished every 12 months even though the renewal period is every 24 months.

== Employment status ==
- Training

There are 180 maintenance schools in the United States. In 2017 number of students was 18,000. The scholarship for students ranges from $2,500 to $16,000.

- Employment opportunity

The U.S. Bureau of Labor Statistics reported that aircraft mechanics and service technicians held about 140,000 jobs in 2025. They project employment to increase by 5 percent from 2025 to 2035 (approximately 140,000 to 147,600 jobs). Primary employers include support activities for air transportation, air transportation, aerospace product and parts manufacturing, and the federal government.

- Wage level

According to the Bureau of Labor Statistics, the median annual wage for aircraft mechanics and service technicians in the United States was $79,870 in May 2025. Median annual wages included $96,170 in air transportation, $90,190 in couriers and express delivery services, $82,720 in aerospace product and parts manufacturing, and $72,910 in support activities for air transportation.

== See also ==
- Aircraft maintenance engineer (Canada)
- Charles Taylor Master Mechanic Award
